= Assassin's Creed Syndicate: Jack the Ripper =

DLC for 2015 Assassin's Creed Syndicate

- Cover art depicting Jack the Ripper and Evie Frye.
- Developer: Ubisoft Montpellier
- Publisher: Ubisoft
- Composer: Bear McCreary
- Series: Assassin's Creed
- Engine: AnvilNext 2.0
- Platforms: PlayStation 4; Xbox One; Windows
- Release: PlayStation 4, Xbox One; December 15, 2015; Windows; December 22, 2015
- Genre: Action-adventure
- Mode: Single-player

Assassin's Creed Syndicate: Jack the Ripper is a downloadable content (DLC) expansion pack developed and published by Ubisoft for the 2015 action-adventure video game Assassin's Creed Syndicate. Set in London in 1888, Jack the Ripper explores the purported untold circumstances surrounding the brutal murders of several prostitutes who lived and worked in the East End of London between 31 August and 9 November 1888, and the true identity of their murderer. The pack follows two player characters who oppose each other: Evie Frye, a member of the Brotherhood of Assassins and one of the two protagonists of the base game, and a fictionalized version of the titular historical figure, depicted as a mentally disturbed renegade Assassin within series lore. Jack the Ripper's goal is to subvert the legacy of his estranged mentor Jacob Frye, while Evie attempts to find her missing brother and stop the Ripper's reign of terror as well as the criminals he has rallied to his cause.

Jack the Ripper is the first major post-launch DLC pack for Syndicate, and was released on various platforms in December 2015. It has a standalone story campaign that is loosely connected to the base game's narrative, but largely retains its central mechanics. American musician Bear McCreary composed the game's soundtrack, replacing Austin Wintory, the composer used for the base game. Reviews for the Xbox One version by video game publications were predominantly positive, whereas the PlayStation 4 version was met with a mixed reception. Most critics praised the DLC for its somber atmosphere (in contrast to Syndicate's more light-hearted tone) and gameplay additions, but criticized its depiction of the titular historical figure, while the portrayal of women garnered mixed responses.

== Gameplay ==
Assassin's Creed Syndicate: Jack the Ripper is the first narrative-driven DLC pack for Assassin's Creed Syndicate and features a separate campaign from the base game. Like Syndicate, the plot is set in a fictional history of real-world events, taking place twenty years after Jacob and Evie Frye liberated London from Templar control with the support of their gang, the Rooks. For the majority of Jack the Ripper, the player assumes the role of Evie as she searches for her missing twin brother Jacob, who has gone missing after an altercation with the Ripper.

Jack the Ripper retains most of the core mechanics of Syndicate: Evie has access to most of her abilities from the base game's skill tree, and can use her rope launcher and carriages to traverse the open world. According to the expansion pack's backstory, Evie permanently relocated to India following the events of Syndicate, where she learned non-lethal intimidation tactics which are meant to frighten enemies. This is incorporated into a new gameplay mechanic introduced in the pack, where Evie can instill fear in her enemies by deploying techniques that are capable of dispatching multiple targets without killing them outright, provided the player acquires these tactics by upgrading a new, small skill tree. Certain missions require Evie to investigate a crime scene, where she searches for hidden clues using "eagle vision" to deduce what had happened, and manipulate the environment to decipher secret messages.

As Evie, the player can also perform side missions to help restore order to London's East End, which usually involve her undermining the Ripper's allies or assisting Sergeant Frederick Abberline, a prominent investigator of the serial killer murders, with the Metropolitan Police Service's investigation of the Ripper murders. A noteworthy series of missions involves Evie liberating oppressed prostitutes from gang members or abusive customers. Players may encounter mission objectives that prompt them to act carefully to prevent gang members from murdering hostage prostitutes, rescue kidnapped women who are herded into carriages, or parade violent customers past crowds of onlookers to shame them. At predetermined points of the narrative, the player briefly controls the pack's titular villain as he furthers his criminal agenda. The Ripper can use the same tools and intimidation tactics as Evie, but unlike her, he has no qualms about murdering anyone who gets in his way. This is reflected in his ability to scare away enemies within the vicinity by shrieking or performing a brutal execution on one of his victims. As in Syndicate, players complete linear scenarios with set objectives to progress through the story for both player characters.

== Plot ==
In 1888, Jacob Frye (Paul Amos) meets with publisher Arthur Weaversbrook (Morgan Davis Jones) and warns him not to make Jack the Ripper's letters public, as it would confer the killer undeserved notoriety. He then receives word of another murder and goes to investigate, but is attacked by the Ripper (Alec Newman). As the Ripper pursues an injured Jacob, it is revealed that he knows Jacob personally. After escaping, Jacob reaches his lodgings, but the Ripper tracks him down, incapacitates him, and seemingly kills him.

Some time after the incident, Evie Frye (Victoria Atkin) arrives in London from India after being summoned by Jacob, and meets police detective Frederick Abberline (Sam Crane), who informs her that her brother is missing and presumed dead. The twins' old gang, the Rooks, have since aligned themselves with the Ripper, and are spreading his reign of terror throughout London's East End. After reaching Jacob's lodgings, Evie deduces that the Ripper is one of Jacob's Assassin Initiates, a wayward youth she once met in India named Jack. To undermine the Ripper's control over the city and draw him out of hiding, Evie assassinates his lieutenants and frees prisoners he had been holding. Meanwhile, Jack stalks her, and eventually decides to set a trap for her at Lambeth Asylum, where it is revealed that he was once confined there before Jacob recruited him. He murders several asylum staff members who tormented him and destroys all records of his identity.

As Jack continues his killing spree, pressure mounts on Evie to track him down. Abberline soon informs her that he can no longer protect her as she has been implicated in the murder of one of the Ripper's lieutenants, further adding that she will be arrested unless she delivers the Ripper soon. After the Ripper's final canonically confirmed murder, Evie re-examines old crime scenes and learns that all of the women he murdered were in fact members of Jacob's Assassin Brotherhood. She also finds messages left by the Ripper, which reveal that he blames Jacob for his mother's murder by the Templars in his youth, and that he has developed an extremist view of the Creed, so he decided to take control of the Brotherhood from Jacob and reform it. Deducing that the Ripper is waiting for her at Lambeth Asylum, Evie confronts Jack there and kills him in battle. She then finds Jacob being held in a cell, badly injured but still alive. With the Ripper dead and Jacob rescued, Abberline agrees to cover up Jack's identity to protect the Assassins' secrecy.

== Development and release ==
Jack the Ripper was released digitally on PlayStation 4 via PlayStation Network, and Xbox One via Xbox Live on December 15, 2015. The Windows version was released one week later on December 22, 2015. Players who purchased the base game's season pass could access Jack the Ripper, which is otherwise available as a standalone purchase. An interactive "immersive 360° trailer, which initially began as a "VR experiment" with no intention for public release, was uploaded to Ubisoft-affiliated video channels to promote the DLC pack. A five-track soundtrack album composed by Bear McCreary for the DLC pack was digitally released on December 15, 2015.

The score for Jack the Ripper is characteristic of McCreary's body of work, which employs a judicious, minimalist approach with melodies. As a composer hired exclusively to work on the DLC, McCreary did not hear the base game's score by Wintory as it was still a work in progress when he got involved with the project. He noted that this placed him in a "total creative vacuum", with his only points of reference being the imagery, the concept, and the story of the titular villain. McCreary believed that the developers intended for a unique tone for Jack the Ripper as a piece of standalone DLC, which he described as a "bleak, dark, gothic, horrific kind of tone" that is unusual for the Assassin's Creed franchise. In contrast to Wintory's traditional, string-oriented score, McCreary went for a more modern approach with electronic elements, as he wanted the score for Jack the Ripper to have an unpleasant atmosphere and sound "very deranged and psychotic and brutal". With regards to Evie's themes, McCreary wanted to evoke an "exotic and more beautiful" sentiment, but at the same time grounding it with a very sad and mysterious theme as she is a character who has gone through a lot of tough times and is facing a difficult opponent in the DLC.

== Reception ==
Reception

Aggregate score
Aggregator	Score
Metacritic	XONE: 77/100; PS4: 72/100

Review scores
Publication	Score
Destructoid	7/10
Electronic Gaming Monthly	7.5/10
Eurogamer	7/10
Hardcore Gamer	8/10
IGN	7.8/10
Official Xbox Magazine (UK)	8/10
Push Square	7/10

Assassin's Creed Syndicate: Jack the Ripper was generally well received on Xbox One, whereas the PlayStation 4 version was met with mixed or average reviews. Brenna Hillier from VG247 proclaimed it the Assassin's Creed franchise's best DLC expansion since Assassin's Creed IV: Black Flag's Freedom Cry. The Official Xbox Magazine gave Jack the Ripper a positive review and called it "a genuinely atmospheric and often disturbing yarn that Ripper and Creed fans shouldn't miss". IGN Spain said Jack the Ripper was good and entertaining while it lasts, but otherwise did not offer anything relevant or different. While Mark Steighner from Hardcore Gamer did not appreciate the incorporation of the real world history behind Jack the Ripper into the Assassin's Creed fictional universe, he found the DLC to be a "substantial and enjoyable additional chapter" which "fits perfectly into the milieu of the base game", providing a "tightly-focused experience from start to finish". Sammy Barker from Push Square compared Jack the Ripper favorably to the "dreadful" Dead Kings DLC for Syndicate's predecessor Assassin's Creed Unity, with praise for the "novel addition" of the fear system, the "strong" story missions and the "compelling, creepy vibe" of the whole campaign.

Luca Forte from the Italian edition of Eurogamer liked the art direction, storytelling and world building of the Assassin's Creed universe by the DLC, but opined that the fear gameplay mechanic and artificial intelligence are not well implemented, and that the Jack the Ripper character did not live up to his full potential. Ray Carsillo from Electronic Gaming Monthly also concurred that Jack the Ripper was not nearly as formidable of a villain as he had imagined, and that Evie's fear techniques were somewhat overpowered. Nevertheless, he concluded that the DLC was a "fun adventure" and a "nice excuse to return to Assassin’s Creed's take on Victorian-Era London". Brett Makedonski from Destructoid noted that while Jack the Ripper does have its strengths and weaknesses, it manages to hold up in spite of the "difficult source material and the obvious danger of stumbling". He felt that the overall experience of Jack the Ripper benefits from its focused and streamlined gameplay design, as "open-world strain can become a serious problem", which makes the DLC pack a welcome "reprieve".

Some critics have focused on the portrayal of women in Jack the Ripper. The decision to have a middle-aged Evie Frye be the lead character of the DLC pack was met with widespread praise. Alexa Ray Corriea from GameSpot considered the positioning of Evie as the murder investigator to be a "powerful narrative move", as she is "a woman horrified for her gender, seeking to avenge wrongs done to her sex". Stephen Totilo from Kotaku said the unexpectedly bold portrayal of female prostitution in Jack the Ripper and its efforts to engender empathy in female sex workers, an oft-overlooked marginalized group in video games, was unprecedented. On the other hand, A. Martin Wainwright took the view that while Jack the Ripper is a storyline which comes close to meeting the Bechdel test within the Assassin's Creed franchise, given that a large part of its narrative follows Evie as she interviews several female characters, a significant aspect of their dialogue still revolve around male characters, albeit not as love interests as noted by Wainright.
