= Assassin's Creed Syndicate =

2015 video game

- Developer: Ubisoft Quebec
- Publisher: Ubisoft
- Directors: Marc-Alexis Côté; Scott Phillips; Wesley Pincombe
- Producer: François Pelland
- Designer: Frédéric St-Laurent B
- Programmer: Pierre-Luc Coté
- Artist: Thierry Dansereau
- Writers: Corey May; Jeffrey Yohalem
- Composer: Austin Wintory
- Series: Assassin's Creed
- Engine: AnvilNext 2.0
- Platforms: PlayStation 4; Xbox One; Windows; Stadia
- Release: October 23, 2015: PlayStation 4, Xbox One; October 23, 2015; Windows; November 19, 2015; Stadia; December 15, 2020
- Genres: Action-adventure, stealth
- Mode: Single-player

Assassin's Creed Syndicate is a 2015 action-adventure game developed by Ubisoft Quebec and published by Ubisoft. It was released on October 23, 2015, for PlayStation 4 and Xbox One, and on November 19, 2015, for Windows. It is the ninth major installment in the Assassin's Creed series, and the successor to 2014's Assassin's Creed Unity.

The game's plot follows the premise of the Assassin's Creed franchise, involving a fictional history of real-world events where a secret war has been fought for centuries between two factions: the Assassins, who promote peace and liberty, and the Templars, who desire peace through control. The framing story is set in the 21st century and features the same unnamed and unseen protagonist from Assassin's Creed Unity who assists the Assassins in their race against the Templars to find an artifact hidden in London. The main story is set in London in 1868, at the onset of the Second Industrial Revolution, and follows twin Assassins Jacob and Evie Frye as they navigate the corridors of organised crime and take back the city from Templar control. The game also includes segments set in 1916, during World War I, which follows Jacob's granddaughter, Lydia Frye.

The game is played from a third-person perspective and its open world is navigated on foot or by carriage. Syndicate introduces new travelling systems to the series, as well as refined combat and stealth mechanics. Players control the two lead characters throughout the main story, switching between them both during and outside of missions. After launch, the game was supported with several releases of downloadable content (DLC), including three story expansions. The most notable of these, Jack the Ripper, is set twenty years after the main campaign and involves Jacob's pursuit of the titular unidentified serial killer.

Assassin's Creed Syndicate received positive reviews upon release, with praise for its visuals, characters, narrative, and level design, while the combat, open-world design and vehicle gameplay were met with some criticism. The game was nominated for multiple awards, including Best Action/Adventure at The Game Awards 2015. Syndicate was less financially successful than previous entries in the series, selling over 5.5 million units by November 2017. Ubisoft attributed the lower sales numbers to a series fatigue among players, caused in part by Assassin's Creed Unity's disappointing release the year prior, and decided to end the annual release cycle for the series. The next main entry, Assassin's Creed Origins, primarily set in Ptolemaic era Ancient Egypt, was released in October 2017, and acts as a soft reboot which introduces more role-playing mechanics and a new modern-day storyline.

== Gameplay ==
Assassin's Creed Syndicate is an action-adventure, stealth game played from a third-person perspective, that features similar gameplay elements to the previous game Assassin's Creed Unity. Players complete missions—linear scenarios with set objectives—to progress through the story. Outside of missions, the player can freely roam the open world. Composed of the greater area of Victorian London, consisting of seven boroughs, (Note: The seven boroughs of London featured in the game are Westminster, the Strand, the City of London, Whitechapel, the Thames, Southwark and Lambeth.) the world of Assassin's Creed Syndicate is larger than previous entries in the series. (Note: The development team stated that the map is approximately 30% larger than Paris in Assassin's Creed Unity (2014).) In keeping with a historical context that more closely resembles the modern-day, the city guard of previous iterations is replaced by a Victorian-era police force, who will rarely attack the player unless a crime is committed in their presence; the player's main enemy is instead a Templar-controlled street gang called the "Blighters".

The game lets the player control two characters: twins Jacob and Evie Frye. Jacob is a hot-headed brawler, specialising in close-ranged combat, while Evie is strong in stealth and relies on her intelligence and wit. Evie is notably the first female playable character in a mainline Assassin's Creed game. (Note: Assassin's Creed III: Liberation featured a female protagonist, but Liberation is not considered a part of the main series.) In contrast to the previous entries' swords and long weapons, the main weapons of Syndicate include era-accurate brass knuckles, compact revolvers, cane-swords, and traditional Nepalese curved kukri knives, all of which can be upgraded to increase their effectiveness. The twins can also be equipped with various outfits and clothing items (belts for Jacob and capes for Evie) which present different statistics, as well as gain additional abilities through a skill tree system. As the player progresses through the game, they earn experience points to level up their characters; for every 1,000 experience points earned, they unlock a "skill point" which can be spent on a new ability. The number of skills unlocked determines each twin's level, which can be a maximum of 10. Enemies also present levels, determining how difficult they are to defeat in combat. However, all enemies can be stealthily assassinated, regardless of level.

Players may travel around the game's open world of London on carriages, which can be piloted or occupied.

The game's combat system was changed from Assassin's Creed Unity, and now focuses on chaining together fast-paced attacks and blocks. The stealth system also saw several improvements with the addition of new gadgets and a kidnapping mechanic, which allows the player to take an enemy hostage and blend in with them to remain unseen, as long as they are not in close proximity to another enemy. Syndicate also builds upon Unity's "Black Box" design for assassination missions by introducing more opportunities for infiltration and distraction, as well as "cinematic kills", which are unlocked after certain parameters are met. For navigation, the game adds several new systems, including a rope launcher, which allows the player to rappel up structures, or create a zip-line between buildings; carriages, which can be piloted or simply occupied by the player, and can be the setting of fights and parkour chases; and a train, which serves as the main base for the player throughout the game.

The side content in Syndicate was designed to reflect the fight for power in London, and is cohesive to the game's main story, adopting a gang warfare mechanic where the city is divided into districts each controlled by the game's two main street gangs. During the game, the Frye twins start a street gang called the Rooks to combat the Blighters' influence, which can be leveled up with various upgrades pertaining to their weaponry, vehicles, and economic opportunities, increasing their effectiveness in combat as well as the passive revenue generated by the gang over time. At the start of the game, London is controlled entirely by the Blighters, but as the player completes optional liberation missions (which can range from freeing child labourers to kidnapping or assassinating a high-profile Templar), each borough slowly comes under the control of the Rooks, culminating in a gang fight to definitively take over the borough. Other side missions focus on assisting prominent historical figures such as Charles Dickens, Karl Marx, and Queen Victoria. Players can also engage in a number of smaller activities for monetary rewards, like fight clubs and carriage races, and find several different types of collectibles, including music boxes containing the keys to a hidden treasure.

Unlike its predecessor, the game has no multiplayer mode, and does not feature a companion app, which was introduced in Assassin's Creed IV: Black Flag.

== Synopsis ==
=== Setting and characters ===
In 1868, at the tail end of the Industrial Revolution, with the Assassin Brotherhood all but eradicated in Victorian London, twins Jacob (Paul Amos) and Evie Frye (Victoria Atkin) leave Crawley for London and arrive to find a city controlled by the Templars, with both the Church and the Monarchy losing their power. Raised as Assassins to follow the Creed, Jacob and Evie aim to take back the city from Templar control by infiltrating and uniting London's criminal underworld, aided by notable figures of the era such as novelist Charles Dickens (Des McAleer); biologist Charles Darwin (Julian Richings); inventor Alexander Graham Bell (Mark Rowley); political theorist Karl Marx (Matthew Marsh); nurse Florence Nightingale (Helen Johns); Maharaja Duleep Singh (Avin Shah), the last maharajah of the Sikh Empire; Sergeant Frederick Abberline (Sam Crane) of the Metropolitan Police Service (known for his investigation of Jack the Ripper); and Queen Victoria (Ellen David). Additionally, Jacob's granddaughter, Lydia Frye (Lisa Norton), appears in a separate World War I segment, where she aids Winston Churchill (Rick Miller) in defending London against a new enemy espionage faction.

=== Plot ===
In 2015, the Helix player, now an Assassin Initiate, is again contacted by Bishop (Kate Todd) to help the Brotherhood find a Piece of Eden in London. While Rebecca Crane and Shaun Hastings infiltrate Abstergo's facility in London, the Initiate relives the memories of Jacob and Evie Frye, twin Assassins from the Victorian era.

In 1868, Evie infiltrates a lab run by David Brewster and Templar occultist Lucy Thorne (Emerald O'Hanrahan), and finds them experimenting on an Apple of Eden. Evie assassinates Brewster, learning that the Templars seek another artifact in London, and escapes from the lab after the Apple explodes. The Frye twins head to London to stop the Templars from finding this Piece of Eden, and meet fellow Assassin Henry Green (Jaz Deol). Henry informs them that the London Brotherhood has fallen, and the city is controlled by the Templars, led by Crawford Starrick (Kris Holden-Ried), a powerful figure in the city's industry and criminal underworld. Although Evie wishes to search for the Piece of Eden, Jacob convinces her to help liberate London's boroughs from Templar-run gangs. In the process, they build up their own gang, the Rooks, and make allies such as Clara O'Dea, Frederick Abberline, Alexander Graham Bell, Charles Darwin, Charles Dickens, Ned Wynert, and Edward Hodson Bayley.

During this time, Jacob, seeking to undermine Starrick's control over London society, assassinates Starrick's allies, including Dr. John Elliotson, who oversaw the production of an addictive tonic; Malcolm Milner, the owner of Starrick's omnibus company; Pearl Attaway, Starrick's cousin and owner of a rival omnibus company; Philip Twopenny, the Governor of the Bank of England who was secretly robbing it; James Brudenell, 7th Earl of Cardigan, who planned to assassinate Prime Minister Benjamin Disraeli; and gang leader Maxwell Roth, who initially supports Jacob, but later reveals himself to be a dangerous sadist.

Meanwhile, Evie looks for the Piece of Eden with Henry's help. Following clues underneath Edward Kenway's mansion, they find the key to the Shroud's vault at St Paul's Cathedral, but Thorne steals it and flees to the Tower of London. Evie infiltrates the Tower and kills Thorne, who reveals the Shroud is not there. Henry believes the vault is hidden in Buckingham Palace, and enlists Maharajah Duleep Singh's help to obtain the building's schematics; however, the Templars seize them first. Evie also corrects consequences of Jacob's assassinations, such as medicine shortages and currency inflation.

With his lieutenants dead, Starrick moves to retrieve the Shroud and eliminate Britain's heads of church and state. Jacob and Evie argue over his recklessness and her inaction, but agree to work together to stop Starrick before going their separate ways. They infiltrate a ball held at Buckingham Palace, but Starrick beats them to the vault and obtains the Shroud. With Henry's help, the Frye twins kill Starrick, before reconciling and returning the Shroud to the vault. For their deeds, Queen Victoria knights the Frye twins and Henry.

In the present, Rebecca and Shaun spy on a meeting between senior Templars Isabelle Ardant and Álvaro Gramática, who are also searching for the Shroud. They attempt to capture Ardant, but are forced to flee after being attacked by Otso Berg and Violet da Costa. After the Initiate locates the Shroud, Shaun, Rebecca and fellow Assassin Galina Voronina head to the vault, but discover that Ardant, Berg, and da Costa beat them to it. A fight ensues, in which Ardant is killed and da Costa escapes with the Shroud. Hacking Ardant's computer, the Assassins learn the Templars plan to use the Shroud to construct a living Precursor. They also discover that Juno is manipulating employees within Abstergo to sabotage the company, and has her own plans for the Shroud.

==== Time Anomaly ====
While exploring Jacob and Evie's memories, the Initiate encounters a "time anomaly" in the Animus, which causes them to relive the memories of Jacob's granddaughter, Lydia Frye. In 1914, at the outbreak of World War I, the Brotherhood removes Jacob and Evie to the countryside while Lydia's husband, a fellow Assassin, is enrolled in the British Army, leaving Lydia to defend London from German spies. In 1916, at the behest of Winston Churchill, Lydia eliminates a German spy facility in Tower Bridge. In the process, she discovers the Templars have infiltrated the Germans' spy network, and hunts them down. In exchange for her services, Churchill promises Lydia that he will ensure the enfranchisement of women after the war. Lydia eventually conquers every Templar-infested area in London, and flushes out the leader of the Templars, revealed to be a Sage, the reincarnation of Juno's husband Aita.

For every objective completed, Juno, the one causing the anomaly, appears and tells the Initiate of her past and rise to power. After Lydia kills the Sage, Juno thanks the Initiate for discovering his fate, and suggests that she and the Assassins could work together in the future.

=== Story expansions ===
==== The Dreadful Crimes ====
At some point following their arrival in London, the Frye twins are approached by Henry Raymond, a penny dreadful writer, and his follower Archie, and the four team up to solve a series of mysterious murders across London. The twins are eventually summoned to Buckingham Palace by Frederick Abberline, to solve the apparent murder of a Queen's Guard. Archie, who has been conducting his own investigation, discovers the culprit to be none other than Raymond, who plots to steal the Queen's Sceptre of the Dove. Raymond posed as the murdered guard to learn the combination to the safe where the Sceptre is kept by watching Queen Victoria open it, and has also faked a bomb threat to cover his escape. While Jacob and Evie evacuate the palace after learning of the bomb threat, Archie tries to stop Raymond, only to end up captured. With Raymond holding Archie hostage, one of the Frye twins distracts Raymond while the other kills him, saving Archie and recovering the Sceptre. In the aftermath, Jacob and Evie encourage Archie to try writing writing detective fiction himself and he is revealed to be Arthur Conan Doyle .

==== Jack the Ripper ====
Set in 1888, twenty years after the events of the main campaign, this expansion follows Evie as she investigates the murders of female Assassins operating as prostitutes in the East End of London, which were carried out by the titular serial killer. The Ripper has rallied former members of the Rooks to his cause to help him carry out his killings, and has also kidnapped Jacob, now the head of the British Brotherhood, who has a personal connection to the killer.

==== The Last Maharaja ====
After confronting Duleep Singh about his lack of commitment to the people of India, Henry enlists the help of the Frye twins to persuade the Maharaja to reclaim his birthright. The twins recover Singh's letters to his mother, which were intercepted by the British Indies Company (B.I.C.). This convinces Singh, who asks the twins to recover Punjabi gold, before arranging for it to be shipped back to India. He then proposes to recover the Koh-i-Noor, an Indian diamond kept in the Tower of London. The twins accomplish this task; however, Henry reveals that the recovered diamond is a replica, and that the true Koh-i-Noor never left India, having been hidden years ago by Jacob and Evie's father Ethan, who was given the diamond by Henry's own father, Arbaaz Mir.

Later, the twins head to a B.I.C. factory and stop the company's production of chemical weapons. In the process, they discover that Brinley Ellsworth, a B.I.C. representative and childhood friend of Singh's, is a Templar and behind the recent plots against the Maharaja. Singh arranges a meeting where he confronts Ellsworth, who tries to murder him. Evie subdues Ellsworth, but Singh chooses to spare his former friend's life and allows him to leave, claiming that they would be no better than the B.I.C. if they killed him. Afterwards, Singh thanks the twins for their contribution and parts ways with them, vowing to continue his mission.

== Development ==
Assassin's Creed Syndicate is the second major entry in the series not to be developed by Ubisoft Montreal, following 2014's Assassin's Creed Rogue. Instead, on July 2, 2014, Ubisoft announced that Ubisoft Quebec would handle lead development as part of "a major investment" in the studio, who had assisted in the making of the six prior games as well as The Tyranny of King Washington and Freedom Cry, downloadable content for Assassin's Creed III and Assassin's Creed IV: Black Flag respectively. Marc-Alexis Côté serves as the creative director for the game after working in various positions on Brotherhood, Revelations, Assassin's Creed III, and Freedom Cry while François Pelland returns as a senior producer after Assassin's Creed III, has also been an executive director on all three in-between entries. Lydia Andrew is the game's audio director, returning from Assassin's Creed III, Black Flag, and Unity. Historian Jean-Vincent Roy served as a consultant on the game, having previously consulted on Assassin's Creed III, and held various other positions at Ubisoft. The game is also first in the series to feature a non-playable transgender character.

=== Music ===
The score to Assassin's Creed Syndicate was composed by American composer Austin Wintory. The lyrical songs in the game, murder ballads, were composed by Wintory and Australian musical comedy band, Tripod. The soundtrack was released on Amazon MP3 and iTunes on October 23, 2015. Bear McCreary composed the score for the Jack the Ripper downloadable content, in which a soundtrack album was released on December 1, 2015.

== Release ==
Information on the game, then titled Assassin's Creed Victory, first leaked on December 2, 2014, through the website Kotaku, which published details and screenshots from a seven-minute "target gameplay footage" video the site had acquired. Kotaku received a large amount of backlash for this article due to the article being placed up with very little information whilst proclaiming several facts that were proven false. Ubisoft confirmed the news later that same day in a statement where the company expressed disappointment that "internal assets, not intended for public consumption" had been leaked but said that they were "excited to officially unveil what the studio has been working on at a later date". The game was officially revealed on May 12, 2015, and was released worldwide on October 23, 2015, for PlayStation 4 and Xbox One, and on November 19, 2015, for Windows.

Life-size toy replicas of weapons used by Evie and Jacob in the game, the "Cane-sword" and the "Gauntlet with Hidden blade", were available for purchase at launch. On May 13, 2015, five different editions of the game were announced for Europe.

On November 18, 2024, Ubisoft announced the release of a patch for Syndicate that will allow players to play the game at 60fps on PlayStation 5 and Xbox Series X/S.

=== Downloadable content ===
Ubisoft supported Syndicate with several releases of downloadable content (DLC), most of which are included in the game's season pass. The Darwin and Dickens Conspiracy expansion pack, which adds three missions involving Charles Darwin and Charles Dickens, was available for players who pre-ordered the game and was later bundled into the Streets of London DLC, featuring several new outfits and gears, on January 19, 2016. The first story-driven pack for the game, Jack the Ripper, loosely based on the notorious crimes committed by the titular serial killer in the Whitechapel area of London in 1888, was released on December 15, 2015, for consoles, and December 22, 2015, for Windows. It adds a new narrative campaign which is separate from the base game and follows Evie's efforts to end the Ripper's reign of terror over London and track down Jacob, who has been kidnapped by the Ripper.

The second story-driven pack, The Last Maharaja, was released on March 1, 2016, for all platforms and focuses on Jacob and Evie helping Duleep Singh in his quest to reclaim his heritage. The final story expansion for the game, The Dreadful Crimes, was initially a PlayStation 4 exclusive until March 2016. It was released for Windows on April 11 and is the only expansion not to be included in the season pass. The DLC builds upon Assassin's Creed Unity's murder investigation system and tasks players to solve multiple murder cases across London.

== Reception ==
Reception

Aggregate score
Aggregator	Score
Metacritic	(XONE) 78/100 (PS4) 76/100 (PC) 74/100

Review scores
Publication	Score
Destructoid	7.5/10
Electronic Gaming Monthly	8.5/10
Game Informer	9/10
GameRevolution	4/5
GameSpot	9/10
GamesRadar+	4/5
Giant Bomb	4/5
IGN	8.2/10
Official Xbox Magazine (UK)	3.5/5
PC Gamer (US)	66/100
Polygon	8.5/10
VideoGamer.com	5/10

Assassin's Creed Syndicate received "generally favorable" reviews for the PlayStation 4 and Xbox One versions, while the PC version of the game received "mixed or average" reviews from critics, according to review aggregator website Metacritic.

Alexa Corriea from GameSpot praised the fluidity of Syndicate's new combat system, as well as the beauty of the map and the addition of the rope launcher. She hailed the game as "a triumphant return to form for the franchise". Daniel Krupa from IGN gave the game an 8.2/10, citing the design of the city and the lighthearted plot as high points, while criticising the repetitive combat, yet saying it was better than Unity's combat. Brett Makedonski from Destructoid gave the game 7.5/10, praising its characters and assassination missions, but criticised the gameplay. He described combat as unsatisfying and carriage-driving as "a pain". Christopher Livingston from PC Gamer gave the game 66/100. He praised the characters and the main missions but criticised the side missions as being repetitive.

=== Sales ===
Assassin's Creed Syndicate debuted at number one in the UK according to Chart-Track. However, in its first week, it was the second worst-selling game of the franchise in the UK, only outselling Assassin's Creed Rogue. According to reports from Ubisoft, these lower sales in the first week were due to the release of Assassin's Creed Unity (2014) having a negative impact on the sales due to its notorious number of bugs and glitches at launch. Syndicate's second week sales beat those of Unity's. The game was the ninth best-selling retail game of 2015 in the UK. By February 2016, the game had sold over 4.12 million units. As of November 2017, Assassin's Creed Syndicate has sold over 5.5 million units.

=== Accolades ===
In April 2020, Game Informer ranked the game as the second best game in the Assassin's Creed series to date. Assassin's Creed Syndicate appeared on several lists of best video games of 2015, including Games Radar, GameSpot, Complex, Eurogamer, Screen Rant, and Kotaku.

List of awards and nominations for Assassin's Creed Syndicate
Year	Award	Category	Recipient	Result	Ref.
2015	The Game Awards 2015	Best Action/Adventure Game	Assassin's Creed Syndicate	Nominated	
2015	GameSpot's Game of the Year 2015 Awards	Game of the Year	Assassin's Creed Syndicate	Nominated	
2015	Canadian Videogame Awards 2015	Game of the Year	Assassin's Creed Syndicate	Won	
2015	Canadian Videogame Awards 2015	Best Console Game	Assassin's Creed Syndicate	Nominated	
2015	Canadian Videogame Awards 2015	Best Animation	Assassin's Creed Syndicate	Won	
2015	Canadian Videogame Awards 2015	Best Audio	Assassin's Creed Syndicate	Won	
2015	Canadian Videogame Awards 2015	Best Game Design	Assassin's Creed Syndicate	Nominated	
2015	Canadian Videogame Awards 2015	Best New Character	Jacob Frye and Evie Frye	Won	
2015	Canadian Videogame Awards 2015	Best Performance	Victoria Atkin as Evie Frye	Won	
2015	Canadian Videogame Awards 2015	Best Visual Arts	Assassin's Creed Syndicate	Won	
2015	Canadian Videogame Awards 2015	Best Writing	Assassin's Creed Syndicate	Nominated	
2015	Canadian Videogame Awards 2015	Fans' Choice Award: Best Canadian-Made Game	Assassin's Creed Syndicate	Nominated	
2016	Game Revolution's Best of 2015 Awards	Best Action Adventure	Assassin's Creed Syndicate	Nominated	
2016	IGN's Best of 2015	PlayStation 4 Game of the Year	Assassin's Creed Syndicate	Nominated	
2016	IGN's Best of 2015	Best Action-Adventure Game	Assassin's Creed Syndicate	Nominated	
2016	IGN's Best of 2015	Best Original Music	Assassin's Creed Syndicate	Nominated	
2016	IGN's Best of 2015	Best Performances	Assassin's Creed Syndicate	Nominated	
2016	68th Writers Guild of America Awards	Outstanding Achievement in Videogame Writing	Marc-Alexis Cote, Hugo Giard, Corey May, Jeffrey Yohalem et al.	Nominated	
2016	19th Annual D.I.C.E. Awards	Outstanding Achievement in Animation	Assassin's Creed Syndicate	Nominated	
2016	19th Annual D.I.C.E. Awards	Outstanding Achievement in Character	Evie Frye	Nominated	
2016	2016 SXSW Gaming Awards	Excellence in Animation	Assassin's Creed Syndicate	Nominated	
2016	2016 SXSW Gaming Awards	Excellence in Art	Assassin's Creed Syndicate	Nominated	
2016	2016 SXSW Gaming Awards	Excellence in Animation	Assassin's Creed Syndicate	Nominated	
2016	15th National Academy of Video Game Trade Reviewers (NAVGTR) awards	Animation, Artistic	Assassin's Creed Syndicate	Nominated	
2016	15th National Academy of Video Game Trade Reviewers (NAVGTR) awards	Art Direction, Period Influence	Assassin's Creed Syndicate	Nominated	
2016	15th National Academy of Video Game Trade Reviewers (NAVGTR) awards	Character Design	Assassin's Creed Syndicate	Nominated	
2016	15th National Academy of Video Game Trade Reviewers (NAVGTR) awards	Costume Design	Assassin's Creed Syndicate	Nominated	
2016	15th National Academy of Video Game Trade Reviewers (NAVGTR) awards	Game Design, Franchise	Assassin's Creed Syndicate	Nominated	
2016	15th National Academy of Video Game Trade Reviewers (NAVGTR) awards	Lighting/Texturing	Assassin's Creed Syndicate	Nominated	
2016	15th National Academy of Video Game Trade Reviewers (NAVGTR) awards	Sound Editing in a Game Cinema	Assassin's Creed Syndicate	Nominated	
2016	12th British Academy Games Awards	Artistic Achievement	Assassin's Creed Syndicate	Nominated	
2016	12th British Academy Games Awards	Audio Achievement	Assassin's Creed Syndicate	Nominated	
2016	12th British Academy Games Awards	Music	Assassin's Creed Syndicate	Nominated	
