= Ubisoft Quebec =

Canadian video game development company

- Native name: Ubisoft Québec
- Type: Subsidiary
- Industry: Video games
- Founded: 27 June 2005; 21 years ago
- Founders: Nicolas Rioux; Andrée Cossette
- Headquarters: Quebec City, Canada
- Number of locations: 2 offices (2019)
- Number of employees: 600 (2023)
- Parent: Ubisoft
- Website: quebec.ubisoft.com

Ubisoft Quebec (French: Ubisoft Québec) is a Canadian video game developer and a studio of Ubisoft based in Quebec City. The studio was established in June 2005 and is best known for its work on the Assassin's Creed franchise.

== History ==
Ubisoft Quebec office in 2013

French video game publisher Ubisoft announced its plans to open a development studio in Quebec City in April 2005. The studio, Ubisoft Quebec, was formally opened on 27 June 2005. Its founders were Nicolas Rioux and Andrée Cossette, of whom Rioux was appointed as general manager. In June 2008, Ubisoft Quebec announced that it had established a computer-generated imagery production arm that would work in conjunction with distributor Guillemot. The unit was closed down again with the foundation of Ubisoft Motion Pictures in May 2011.

Longtail Studios's Quebec City development studio was acquired by Ubisoft in March 2010 and merged into Ubisoft Quebec. Forty-eight employees were transferred to Ubisoft Quebec, while another 6–7, including the acquired studio's manager, departed. In June 2013, François Pelland was appointed as Ubisoft Quebec's executive director of development. In September 2013, Ubisoft announced its intent to invest CA$373 million in Ubisoft Quebec over seven years to create up to 500 jobs. A first investment of CA$28 million in January 2014 opened 100 positions. Following onto another CA$4 million investment in July 2014, Ubisoft Quebec stated that it would move to new offices in the Saint-Roch neighbourhood of Quebec City and open another 100 positions.

When Rioux became "vice president of technology" for all of Ubisoft's Canadian studios in November 2017, Patrick Klaus was appointed Ubisoft Quebec's managing director, with Cossette as associate managing director. In December 2018, Mike Laidlaw joined the studio as creative director, having previously stepped down from the same position at BioWare, before departing again in February 2020. The Saint-Roch location, known as UbiNord, was opened in April 2019. Cossette succeeded Klaus as managing director in November 2019, after Klaus had left the studio earlier that year. Cossette left Ubisoft Quebec in July 2020.

== Games developed ==
After developing expansion packs for Assassin's Creed III and Assassin's Creed IV: Black Flag, Ubisoft Quebec became the first Ubisoft studio outside Ubisoft Montreal to lead the development of a mainline Assassin's Creed game. The studio's first Assassin's Creed game was Assassin's Creed Syndicate, which was released in October 2015, and continued with Assassin's Creed Odyssey, released in October 2018.

The studio ventured into mobile game development, collaborating with Ubisoft Montreal on Tom Clancy's Rainbow Six Mobile for Android and iOS, announced on April 5, 2022. The title is the adapted version for mobile devices of Tom Clancy's Rainbow Six Siege, a successful tactical shooter game belonging to the Tom Clancy's Rainbow Six series, which Ubisoft Montreal released in December 2015 for PC and consoles.

Year	Title	Platform(s)
2006	Tom Clancy's Rainbow Six: Critical Hour	Xbox
2006	Open Season	Nintendo DS, PlayStation Portable
2007	Tom Clancy's Rainbow Six: Vegas	PlayStation Portable
2007	Cranium Kabookii	Wii
2007	Surf's Up	Game Boy Advance, Nintendo DS, PlayStation Portable
2007	TMNT	Nintendo DS, PlayStation Portable
2008	Battle of Giants: Dinosaurs	Nintendo DS
2008	My Stop Smoking Coach with Allen Carr	Nintendo DS
2009	Battle of Giants: Dragons	Nintendo DS
2010	Battle of Giants: Mutant Insects	Nintendo DS
2010	Battle of Giants: Dinosaurs Strike	Wii
2010	Battle of Giants: Dinosaurs Fight For Survival	Nintendo DSi
2010	Prince of Persia: The Forgotten Sands	PlayStation Portable, Wii
2010	Prince of Persia	iOS
2010	Battle of Giants: Mutant Insects: Revenge	Nintendo DSi
2010	Petz Fantasy: Sunshine Magic	Nintendo DS
2010	Petz Fantasy: Moonlight Magic	Nintendo DS
2011	Combat of Giants: Dinosaurs 3D	Nintendo 3DS
2011	PowerUp Heroes	Xbox 360
2011	The Black Eyed Peas Experience	Wii
2012	Marvel Avengers: Battle for Earth	Wii U, Xbox 360
2012	Might & Magic: Duel of Champions	iOS, Windows
2012	ESPN Sports Connection	Wii U
2013	Assassin's Creed Freedom Cry	PlayStation 3, PlayStation 4, Windows, Xbox 360, Xbox One
2015	Assassin's Creed Syndicate	PlayStation 4, Stadia, Windows, Xbox One, Amazon Luna
2015	Assassin's Creed Syndicate: Jack the Ripper	PlayStation 4, Windows, Xbox One
2018	Assassin's Creed Odyssey	Nintendo Switch, PlayStation 4, Windows, Xbox One, Stadia, Amazon Luna
2020	Immortals Fenyx Rising	Nintendo Switch, PlayStation 4, PlayStation 5, Windows, Xbox One, Xbox Series X/S, Stadia, Amazon Luna
2025	Assassin's Creed Shadows	Nintendo Switch 2, PlayStation 5, Windows, Xbox Series X/S, macOS, iPadOS, Steam Deck, Amazon Luna, GeForce Now
2026	Tom Clancy's Rainbow Six Mobile	iOS, Android
