= Ac:r =

Ac:r may mean:

- Assassin's Creed Revelations
- Assassin's Creed Rogue
