= Combat of Giants: Dinosaurs 3D =

2011 video game

- North American box art
- Developer: Ubisoft Quebec
- Publisher: Ubisoft
- Composer: Chance Thomas
- Series: Combat of Giants
- Platform: Nintendo 3DS
- Release: JP: February 26, 2011; EU: March 31, 2011; NA: March 27, 2011
- Genre: Role-playing

Combat of Giants: Dinosaurs 3D is a role-playing video game in the Combat of Giants series. It was developed and published by Ubisoft, and released for the Nintendo 3DS on February 26, 2011 in Japan, March 27, 2011 in North America, and March 31, 2011 in Europe. In the game, players control various dinosaurs and fight hostile dinosaurs to progress through levels.

== Gameplay ==
Combat of Giants: Dinosaurs 3D takes place in the prehistoric age, where dinosaurs lived in a peaceful world overlooked by four guardians. One day, a series of cataclysmic events kills off the guardian dinosaurs, and an evil dinosaur known as Arkosaurus invades the land. Only four dinosaur champions can stop him.

The game features the ability to customize and battle as different species of dinosaurs against other dinosaurs. All the dinosaurs in the game are divided into four "groups"- predator, hunter, charger, or defender. The player must pick a dinosaur from one of these groups and level up to be able to challenge the final boss at the end of the game. In order to battle the Arkosaurus, the final boss of the game, the player must use a dinosaur from each of the four groups.

In order to progress through the game, players must use their dinosaurs to defeat enemy dinosaurs in an attack and dodge oriented combat system. The playable dinosaurs have slightly different stats. While in combat, players press the b button to attack and the a button to push or charge into the enemy. Players can also make their dinosaurs dodge. Some dinosaurs are equipped with certain "weapons." When equipped, these items lend the dinosaurs power-ups. On certain occasions, enemy dinosaurs will flash blue. If the player attacks an enemy dinosaur while it is flashing blue, the player's dinosaur will perform a powerful attack called a "dinostrike". Enemy dinosaurs will flash red shortly before they attack. This signals players to prepare to dodge or risk losing health. Dinosaurs can also perform "frenzy attacks" that deal more damage than normal attacks. The game contains earthquakes and volcanic eruptions that can knock dinosaurs around and damage them during combat. The player wins a fight by reducing the health of all enemy dinosaurs to zero.

=== Dinosaurs and release ===
Combat of Giants: Dinosaurs 3D features 24 different dinosaurs such as Allosaurus, Ceratosaurus, Oviraptor, Stegosaurus and T. rex to name a few. Most of these dinosaurs can be controlled by the player, boss dinosaurs cannot be controlled by the player. The game has 6 "Boss" dinosaurs.

== Development ==
Ubisoft originally announced the game under the title Battle of Giants: Dinosaur Strike at E3 2010. By 2011, Ubisoft had renamed the game to its final title. It was released in North America on March 27, 2011, as a launch title for the Nintendo 3DS. Chance Thomas served as music composer while Christian Pacaud worked on audio design.

== Reception ==
Reception

Aggregate score
| Aggregator | Score |
|---|---|
| Metacritic | 44/100 |

Review scores
| Publication | Score |
|---|---|
| GameSpot | 4.5/10 |
| IGN | 5.5/10 |
| Nintendo World Report | 5/10 |

Combat of Giants: Dinosaurs 3D received a "generally unfavorable" reception according to Metacritic, based on 18 reviews. Critics generally praised the graphics and a large set of playable dinosaurs, but disliked the redundant campaign and simplistic combat, which they felt was uninteresting.

IGN reviewer Jack DeVries called the game's concept "brilliant" but felt that the game did not live up to this concept. He felt that the game needed "More varied gameplay, a longer career that got challenging and multiplayer."

Josh Max, a writer for Nintendo World Report, praised the game for fun dinosaur customization, an excellent concept, and being "easy to pick up and play." That said, he disliked the low difficulty and lack of replay value, and he felt that the game could have made better use of the 3DS's 3D capabilities. Max ultimately concluded that the game "has an amazing concept but, unfortunately, fell short of its potential."

GameSpot writer Jane Douglas criticized the game for a redundant campaign, lack of use of the touch screen, ineffective use of the 3DS's StreetPass capabilities, and the lack of a head-to-head multiplayer combat mode. She also found the combat system to be overly simplistic, saying that "Only very young or inexperienced players will be challenged by the carefully telegraphed dodge-hit-dodge battles." However, she praised the game for "Amusing dino customization" and "neat visuals", saying that "the visuals are decent and amiably colourful."
