= Frye twins =

Characters in Assassin's Creed video games

Jacob and Evie Frye
- Assassin's Creed character
- Promotional art of Jacob Frye (left) and Evie Frye (right) for Assassin's Creed Syndicate
- First appearance: Assassin's Creed Syndicate (2015)
- Created by: Ubisoft
- Portrayed by: Paul Amos (Jacob); Victoria Atkin (Evie)

In-universe information
- Family: Ethan Frye (father); Cecily Frye (mother)
- Spouse: Henry Green (Evie's husband)
- Relatives: Lydia Frye (Jacob's granddaughter; Evie's grandniece); Jackie O'Connell (Evie's descendant)
- Origin: Crawley, England, United Kingdom
- Nationality: British

Jacob Frye and Evie Frye, collectively known as the Frye twins, are a duo of sibling characters from Ubisoft's Assassin's Creed video game franchise. They first appear as the player characters of the 2015 video game Assassin's Creed Syndicate, in which they are portrayed through performance capture by Paul Amos (Jacob) and Victoria Atkin (Evie).

Within the series' alternate historical setting, both characters are members of the Assassin Brotherhood (a fictional organization inspired by the real-life Order of Assassins that is dedicated to protecting peace and freedom) active in Victorian England at the onset of the Second Industrial Revolution. In Syndicate, the twins travel to London to rebuild the local Assassins branch, which was previously decimated by their mortal enemies, the Templar Order, and liberate the city from the Templars' control. The twins accomplish their victory over the Templars by extending their influence over the city's criminal elements and rallying support from its underclass against the rampant inequality under Templar rule.

The Frye twins have made further appearances in other games or media with varying levels of importance. Both Jacob and Evie have received a generally positive reception from critics, with praise directed at their conflicting personalities, which is reflected in their individual gameplay style. Evie in particular has drawn unanimous approval for her status as a female protagonist in the Assassin's Creed main series games, and has generated wider discussions about gender representation within the franchise since her first appearance.

== Character overview ==
The Frye twins are the main characters of the 2015 video game Assassin's Creed Syndicate. Jacob and Evie have individual skill trees which may be personalised by the player. Both characters play similarly, though they each have distinct skills which incentivizes a specific playstyle: Evie's unique abilities are advantageous for a stealth-centric play style, while Jacob's provide more advantages in open combat, such as a counterattack that guarantees a headshot against enemy targets. Their divergent gameplay styles are reflected in their personalities: Evie is more reverent towards the Assassins' traditions and behaves like an archetypal member of the Brotherhood who discreetly dispatches their targets from the shadows, while Jacob is more laidback and eager to openly confront the Templars in the frontlines by recruiting the criminal elements of London to his cause and leading them against Templar-backed targets.

== Concept and design ==
When designing a character for the Assassin's Creed games, the projects' leaders would create a backstory for their writing and design teams to build off of, though much of that information is never revealed to the player. The idea to implement two protagonists was established at the very beginning of Syndicate's development, though the writers took more time to define their relationship and building a credible difference between their personalities. According to Syndicate creative director Marc-Alexis Cote, the idea eventually evolved into a pair of twin protagonists, and a brother-sister relationship that is emotionally accessible for many players but which Ubisoft staff had yet to explore at the time. Cote explained that this was his team's way of making Syndicate "feel new and fresh" in the franchise and a way to avoid "telling the same story", describing Jacob and Evie as being "built from scratch" with their own distinct personalities. Noting the enduring popularity of series protagonist Ezio Auditore da Firenze, Cote emphasized that the idea to "carbon copy" Ezio in order recapture that level of popularity for future series protagonists was never under consideration by the team, as it is important for them to create "new and unique characters" and hope for "some sort of success".

Cote said the team came to a realization when developing the concept for Syndicate's protagonists that they could tell a more interesting and playful story through the relationship between a pair of twin siblings by insisting on their differences. Writer Melissa MacCoubrey explained that the Frye twins were intentionally designed to coexist as a functioning unit and at the same time contrast each other. To her, Evie's dedication to intellectual pursuits is a good foil to Jacob's wisecracking personality, and vice versa. The team found that her temperament as the more understanding, approachable twin compliments the ideology and behavior of the twins' book-ish ally Henry Green, which led to a concerted effort by the writers to develop the romantic relationship between him and Evie. The contrast also extends to how each sibling approaches combat situations: Jacob prefers a more straightforward approach whereas his sister is focused and calculated with the execution of her plans and targets. MacCoubrey drew an analogy between Jacob's style as a messy brawler and a comedian's routine: for instance, Jacob would know that he is doing well in a fight when he observes his opponent struggling, in the same way that a self-aware comedian knows they are doing well when faced with an appreciative audience who readily responds with laughter to their jokes. Within that context, the precision and secrecy surrounding Evie's fighting design reflects her mindset as someone who is task-oriented and treats fighting as part of her job instead of being a fun or stimulating activity, as well as her dedication towards traditional Assassin abilities unlike Jacob, who relishes in leading an army of followers to street fights.

Lead writer of Syndicate Jeffrey Yohalem indicated during a 2015 interview that the team deliberately avoided giving Jacob a female love interest in the main storyline and suggested that he needed to "figure himself out to some degree" following his brief partnership with rival gang leader Maxwell Roth. In a 2015 interview published by The Mary Sue, MacCoubrey suggested that Jacob's "approach to human interaction is so vastly different" that he pushes others back before he can even contemplate bringing them in. A traditional relationship does not make sense for Jacob since in her view, he does not put adequate effort into interpersonal interactions. The game's producers later confirmed on social media that Jacob is canonically bisexual, though players could only deduce his sexual orientation based on in-universe hints.

According to Ubisoft staff, the decision to include a female protagonist in Evie was not a response in any way to the controversy surrounding the lack of female representation in Assassin's Creed Unity, the predecessor to Syndicate. Because her inclusion in the game had no connection to the controversy, "everything about her flows perfectly in the story with Jacob" and is not "shoehorned", according to Level design director Hugo Giard. Evie was originally an unrelated older woman, or an older or younger sister prior to the finalization of her character concept as Jacob's twin sister and her backstory as someone who follows the Assassin's creed or code of conduct more strictly compared to her brother. Conceptually, Evie is depicted as a "perfectly capable individual, but also acts as a bridge between the Assassin plot and the characters who inhabit London". MacCoubrey compiled a 250-page document about historical characters meant to be used as inspiration for original characters: for Evie, this concept extended to notable women within a thirty year time frame, such as Ada Lovelace, Elizabeth Garrett Anderson, Octavia Hill, and Millicent Fawcett. MacCoubrey explained that the goal was to convincingly portray Evie as a character who is accessible but also independent, without leaning on a common tropes of female character as intellectually superior but emotionally inaccessible, and the team worked hard as a unit when approaching Evie's design to achieve that. Once the team determined how the pieces of the story fit together and defined the relationship between Jacob and Evie, finding Evie's voice and what motivates her decisions throughout the story became an easy and straightforward process.

Evie's physical features were designed to reflect her personality, with "deep and intense eyes, analyzing every situation and her surroundings". According to concept artist Grant Hiller and Art Director Thierry Dansereau, her well styled hair, specifically her symmetrical and structured braids, echoes her attention to detail, though the few strands of hair that comes out is also a nod to her hot temper and dynamism. Evie's designers opted for more functional attire befitting of a female Assassin, which is defined by the use of sharp angles, long coat, the red sash, the white color and obviously the hood and the hidden blade. The team attempted to retain much of the character's visual elements when designing her alternate outfits, as well as in-universe credibility within the Victorian era. Instead of elaborate dresses from that time period, the development team took inspiration from contemporary British punk and rock scenes.

=== Portrayal ===
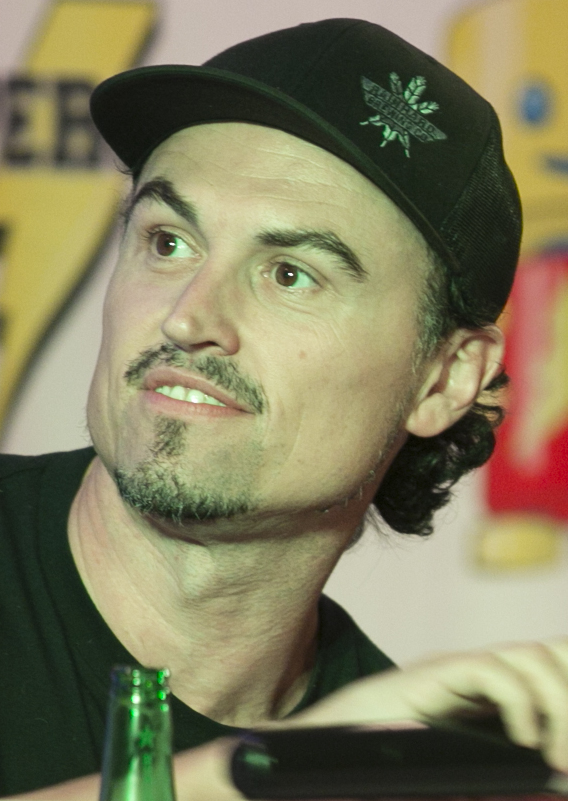
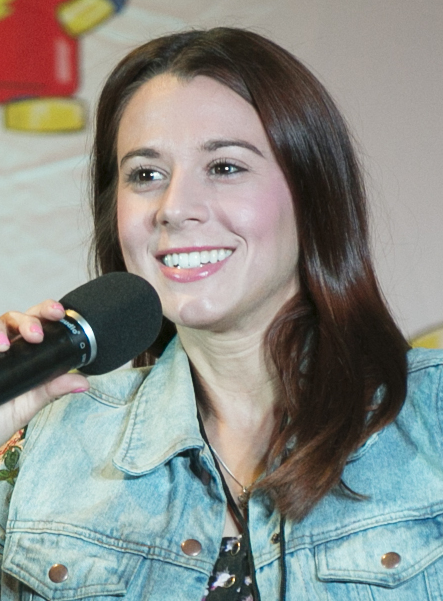
Paul Amos (left) and Victoria Atkin (right) portrayed Jacob and Evie Frye, respectively.

Jacob and Evie Frye were portrayed by Welsh actor Paul Amos and English actress Victoria Atkin respectively. Amos described the twins as being from an educated class among the Brotherhood of Assassins, and they are a powerful force when working together. While he thought of Evie as a "clinical and very ordered" individual, he described Jacob as multifaceted: brash and aggressive, but is also charming and has a sense of humour. Portraying Jacob and Evie was the first time both Amos and Atkin were involved in a motion capture process: they filmed inside a large padded cell, and wore lycra suits and helmets with an attached camera directed towards their faces, which were lined with dots to capture their facial expressions.

Atkin contrasted the experience to a live theatre performance, where the crew could shoot everything in one go. Atkin described the shoot as a very active experience, as the actors were always jumping off something or running around. Atkin wore heels for the entire motion capture experience, an experience which she said she was proud of. She described the overall experience as "liberating" and a "dream job", with its "combination of sports, martial arts and acting", with no set, props or costumes which she experienced in most other productions. Jacob and Evie had their own stunt actors, who handled performance capture for fight scenes, large action sequences, and rope launcher jumps.

In response to a July 2020 expose by Jason Schreier from Bloomberg about the allegations of workplace misconduct and sexism within Ubisoft company culture, Atkin expressed relief on social media that the situation is now in the public eye and admitted that she was confronted by some of the alleged behavior during her time working with Syndicate's developers. Syndicate writer Ceri Young responded to Atkin's Twitter post, complimenting her for her professionalism and performance as Evie. She apologized to Atkin for how Ubisoft treated her, and implied that it was difficult to "bring... [Evie] into the world" due to Ubisoft's interference. Atkin responded and praised Young for writing "an amazing female character" despite the obstacles she faced.

== Appearances ==
=== Assassin's Creed Syndicate ===
Jacob and Evie were born in 1847 to Ethan Frye and his wife Cecily, both members of the British Brotherhood of Assassins. The twins' mother died of complications during childbirth, deeply affecting Ethan, who subsequently took a very rigorous and distant approach to raising and training his children as Assassins. While Evie grew up idolizing their father, Jacob's more rebellious attitude often put him at odds with Ethan, who eventually died of pleurisy in early 1868, shortly before the events of Syndicate.

At the start of Syndicate's storyline, the Frye twins' superiors in the Brotherhood receive word from Henry Green, who runs the Assassin bureau in London, that the city has fallen under the complete control of the Templars and their Grand Master Crawford Starrick, a powerful figure in London's industry and criminal underworld. Starrick plots to use his wealth and influence to increase the Templars' political power within Britain and, through its holdings, the world, effectively making the British Empire an arm of the Templar Order. The Brotherhood leadership is hesitant to send any Assassin to heed Henry's request for help, so the Frye twins, after learning that Starrick is searching for a powerful Piece of Eden that could further his goals, decide to disobey orders and travel to London to put an end to the Templars' schemes.

Once in the city, Jacob and Evie are met by Henry Green, who reveals himself to be the son of Indian Assassin Arbaaz Mir and an old acquaintance of their late father Ethan. Aided by Henry and several other allies, including fictional versions of real-life historical figures like Frederick Abberline, Charles Dickens, Alexander Graham Bell, and Charles Darwin, the Frye twins gradually take control of London from the Blighters, a Templar-run criminal gang, by building up their own gang called the Rooks and rallying support from the city's underclass. Despite this, the twins have different ideas on how to defeat the Templars: Jacob opts to take the fight directly to Starrick by assassinating his most trusted allies to dismantle the Templar Order's power infrastructure, while Evie decides to search for the Piece of Eden. In the process, they both come to see the flaws in their plans and their own way of thinking, with Jacob becoming aware of his reckless actions following a short-lived alliance with Blighters leader Maxwell Roth, while Evie begins to question Ethan's teachings, who strongly advised against letting emotions get in the way of completing a mission, after she develops romantic feelings for Henry.

After all of Starrick's allies have been eliminated and the Piece of Eden located, the Frye twins decide to put their personal grievances with each other aside and work together to defeat Starrick, who is planning to simultaneously eliminate Britain's heads of church and state and acquire the Piece of Eden during a ball at Buckingham Palace. After foiling Starrick's plot and killing him with Henry's help, Jacob and Evie reconcile and are knighted by Queen Victoria for their heroic deeds.

Set in 1888, twenty years after the defeat of the London Templars, Assassin's Creed Syndicate: Jack the Ripper reveals that the Frye twins went their separate ways: Evie relocated to India after marrying Henry while Jacob became the leader of the British Brotherhood of Assassins, though it has been decimated by a fictionalized version of Jack the Ripper, who is depicted as Jacob's renegade protégé. The DLC pack follows Evie's exploits as its lead character following her return to London, where she investigates Jacob's disappearance as well as a series of murders linked to the Ripper in an attempt to stop the villain's reign of terror.

The Frye twins are mentioned in the side mission Time Anomaly, which follows Jacob's granddaughter Lydia Frye as the protagonist working with Winston Churchill to eliminate the returning Templars in London during World War I. Prior to this, Jacob and Evie oversaw Lydia's training as her parents were frequently abroad on missions for the Brotherhood before being relocated to the countryside on the outbreak of World War I.

=== Other appearances ===
The Frye twins have made several appearances throughout Assassin's Creed franchise media. Both Jacob and Evie appear as supporting characters in Assassin's Creed: Underworld, a 2015 prequel novel to Syndicate which features Henry Green (originally known as Jayadeep Mir) as its central character and explores his early life and apprenticeship under the twins' father, Ethan Frye. Evie is also featured in the 2016 comic book miniseries, Assassin's Creed: Last Descendants – Locus, in which she teams up with Henry and Pinkerton detective Tommy Greyling to thwart a Templar plot in London in 1872. The twins are referenced in passing in the 2018 installment Assassin's Creed: Odyssey, though Evie may be recruited as a simulated lieutenant on the ship Adrestia if players unlock this feature via Ubisoft Club. Both Jacob and Evie are unlockable characters for Assassin's Creed: Rebellion, a mobile free-to-play strategy RPG action game. Jacob's outfit is an unlockable cosmetic option in the remastered versions of Assassin's Creed III and Assassin's Creed Rogue.

The twins have also been referenced outside of the Assassin's Creed franchise, most notably in 2020's Watch Dogs: Legion. Jacob Frye is a potential easter egg reference in the backstory for procedurally generated characters in the game world of Legion, which is also set in London, during the 21st century. The twins later make a full-fledged crossover appearance in the Watch Dogs universe as part of a major 2021 update that introduced optional story content for Legion, where it is revealed that they are the ancestors of Darcy Clarkson, a recruitable player character who is a member of the Assassin Brotherhood, and her brother Lucas. According to Ubisoft staff, the crossover content is considered to be non-canonical.

== Promotion and merchandise ==
To promote Syndicate, Ubisoft released promotional trailers which showcased Jacob and Evie individually. In July 2015, Ubisoft organized a Syndicate-themed obstacle course, which was held across the street from the San Diego Convention Center and coincided with the 2015 San Diego Comic-Con. Amos and Atkin both participated in the event.

Jacob has been extensively featured in the game's marketing campaign and franchise merchandising, often with Evie's importance downplayed or excluded entirely. Certain special editions of Syndicate come bundled with figurines depicting Jacob. In 2016, a standalone highly detailed statue of Jacob was released.

== Reception ==
The Frye twins have received a generally positive response from critics and are often ranked in high placements in lists of "top" character in Assassin Creed franchise. IGN staff members as well as Aleksander Gilyadov from VentureBeat consider the Frye twins to be the best protagonists of the franchise since Ezio Auditore. Both characters are recognized by commentators as milestones of diversity representation: Jacob is the first confirmed bisexual lead character of the Assassin's Creed franchise, and Evie is the first female Assassin to lead a main series game.

Evie in particular attracted broad critical acclaim, and generated substantial discussion over the role of women in the franchise. Evie was named Best New Character at the 2015 Canadian Videogame Awards. while Syndicate received a nomination at the 19th Annual D.I.C.E. Awards for "Outstanding Achievement in Character" for Evie. Game Informer ranked her among the best female video games characters of 2015. Polygon also listed her among the best video game women of 2015. Several critic lists expressed a preference for her over Jacob. In an August 2015 article previewing Syndicate, Sherif Saed claimed that Evie quickly became the favorite new series protagonist among VG247 staff. Gilyadov praised Evie as a "well-realized, tough female character" who does not come across like a caricature. CNET named Evie the 24th best female video game character of all time, characterizing her as a "likable, stealthy killer". Tanya DePass praised Syndicate as an uncommon example of a video game that properly handles diverse representation, primarily due to its portrayal of Evie.

The handling of a fan's line of questioning about Jacob's sexuality by Ubisoft staff on social media generated discussions among some commentators. Cora Walker from Remeshed was pleased that Jacob's character arc subverted her initially negative impression of the character as a hypermasculine archetype, but expressed a hope that there will be less ambiguity about his capacity for same-gender attraction in future stories. James Troughton from TheGamer considered the situation to be an instance of bisexual erasure and was disappointed by the fact that Ubisoft's writers were unable or unwilling to depict Jacob's sexuality in an unambiguous manner within the storyline of Syndicate. Adrienne Shaw noted that it is rare for video game developers to "offer such clear a declaration of characters' debated or queerly read sexualities", as most LGBTQ video game content is often implicit in nature.
