= Assassin's Creed Rogue =

2014 video game

- Cover art depicting protagonist Shay Cormac
- Developer: Ubisoft Sofia (Note: Additional work by Ubisoft Singapore, Ubisoft Montreal, Ubisoft Quebec, Ubisoft Kyiv, Ubisoft Chengdu, Ubisoft Milan and Ubisoft Bucharest)
- Publisher: Ubisoft
- Directors: Mikhail Lozanov; Spass Kroushkov; Martin Capel
- Producer: Ivan Balabanov
- Designer: Martin Capel
- Artist: Eddie Bennun
- Writer: Richard Farrese
- Composer: Elitsa Alexandrova
- Series: Assassin's Creed
- Engine: AnvilNext
- Platforms: PlayStation 3; Xbox 360; Windows; PlayStation 4; Xbox One; Nintendo Switch; Google Stadia
- Release: November 11, 2014: PlayStation 3, Xbox 360; NA: November 11, 2014; PAL: November 13, 2014; UK: November 14, 2014; Windows; WW: March 10, 2015; Remastered; PlayStation 4, Xbox One; WW: March 20, 2018; The Rebel Collection; Nintendo Switch; WW: December 6, 2019; Google Stadia; WW: October 5, 2021
- Genres: Action-adventure, stealth
- Mode: Single-player

Assassin's Creed Rogue is a 2014 action-adventure game developed by Ubisoft Sofia and published by Ubisoft. It is the seventh major installment in the Assassin's Creed series, and is set alongside 2012's Assassin's Creed III and after 2013's Assassin's Creed IV: Black Flag. It also has ties to Assassin's Creed Unity, which was released on the same day as Rogue. It is the last Assassin's Creed game to be developed for the seventh generation of consoles, being released for PlayStation 3 and Xbox 360 in November 2014 and for Windows in March 2015. A remastered version of the game was released for PlayStation 4 and Xbox One in March 2018. It was also released on the Nintendo Switch as part of The Rebel Collection alongside Black Flag in December 2019 and for Google Stadia in October 2021.

The plot is set during a fictional history of real-world events in the North Atlantic, and follows the millennia-old struggle between the Assassin Brotherhood, who fight to preserve peace and free will, and the Templar Order, who desire peace through control. The framing story is set during the 21st century and depicts the player as an employee of Abstergo Industries (a company used as a front by the modern-day Templars), who uncovers various secrets about the Assassin-Templar conflict while attempting to fix the company's servers. The main plot is set before and during the French and Indian War from 1752 to 1760, and follows Shay Patrick Cormac, an Irish American privateer and Assassin, who defects to the Templars and helps them hunt down members of his former Brotherhood after becoming disillusioned with their tactics. Gameplay in Rogue is very similar to that of Black Flag with a mixture of ship-based naval exploration and third-person land-based exploration, though some new features have been added.

Upon release, Rogue received a mixed reception, with praise directed at the game's twist on the traditional formula by playing as a Templar, storyline, protagonist, and naval warfare gameplay. However, it was criticized for failing to innovate the series' formula, its short length, and similarities to Black Flag.

== Gameplay ==
Assassin's Creed Rogue is an action-adventure, stealth game set in an open world environment and played from a third-person perspective. The game features three main areas: the western North Atlantic (around the Gulf of Saint Lawrence), the fictional River Valley (partly inspired by the Hudson Valley), and New York City. The first two include numerous individual locations that can be explored, such as small islands, human settlements, naval forts, and shipwrecks. Like Assassin's Creed IV: Black Flag, naval exploration and combat are a major component of the gameplay. The Morrigan, the ship that protagonist Shay Cormac captains, has a shallower draft than Edward Kenway's Jackdaw, allowing for river travel, and can be equipped with several new weapons, including Puckle guns, oil slicks which can be ignited, and an icebreaker. Additionally, enemy ships can board the Morrigan, and certain icebergs can be destroyed to create waves that damage smaller ships. However, the underwater diving missions featured in Black Flag have been removed as swimming in the North Atlantic causes the player's health to rapidly deplete due to the frigid water, though Shay is able to swim freely in the southerly waters of the River Valley.

In this gameplay screenshot, the player is encouraged to take advantage of a puckle gun in a boss fight.

For combat, the game introduces an air rifle, similar to the blowpipe from Black Flag, which allows the player to silently take out enemies at a distance. The air rifle can be outfitted with a variety of different projectiles, such as sleeping darts and firecrackers. At a predetermined point in the narrative, Shay is also given a grenade launcher attachment for his rifle by a fictionalized version of Benjamin Franklin, which could fire off shrapnel grenades and other loads. Hand-to-hand combat has been slightly altered, and now enemy attacks can be countered with timing, similar to the Batman: Arkham series of games. Enemy Assassins feature archetypes similar to previous games, using skills that players have been using throughout the series; they can hide in bushes, blend in with crowds, and perform air assassinations against the player. Poison gas can now be used as an environmental weapon, and Shay has a mask that can mitigate its effects. When being stalked by an enemy, Shay's Eagle Vision changes to reflect this, taking elements from the multiplayer feature of previous games in the series that allowed players to track an enemy's position via a radar-like system. Even without using Eagle Vision, the player is warned of the presence of stalkers by the edges of the screen turning red.

The player can upgrade Shay's equipment through a crafting system, which requires animal pelts gained from hunting or fishing. In-game collectibles, such as Templar treasures, Native pillars, and Viking sword fragments, also provide Shay with new outfits and equipment upon finding them. The Morrigan can also be upgraded using resources acquired from raiding ships, warehouses, and camps, allowing it to face off against more powerful ships; the strongest of which are the five Legendary Ships—hidden boss battles located in the North Atlantic, which were also present in Black Flag.

Side missions and activities return, with a number of them based on those of the previous games. Reflecting Shay's role as a Templar, the game introduces a new side mission: Assassin Interception. These mirror the Assassination side missions in previous games, in that Shay, after intercepting a messenger pigeon carrying an assassination contract, must prevent an assassination target from being killed by finding and eliminating Assassins hidden nearby. Other side activities are connected to the Seven Years' War and include naval clashes, freeing prisoners of war held aboard enemy ships, and taking over enemy forts and settlements.

Another returning feature from earlier installments is the ability to renovate buildings, which then generate income that is deposited in the bank and must be collected regularly. This system functions similarly to the Borgia towers from Assassin's Creed: Brotherhood and the Templar dens from Assassin's Creed: Revelations, as buildings can only be renovated after the area they are located in has been liberated from the Assassins' control. In the game, the Assassins run a gang that has a total of ten hideouts across the three main regions. To clear a hideout, the player must assassinate its gang leader (who can block most of Shay's direct attacks and has an unblockable hidden blade strike), burn the gang's flag, and in some cases kill Templar defectors or rescue captured British soldiers.

Like previous Assassin's Creed titles, characters based on historical figures are present in the game, including Benjamin Franklin, George Monro, Louis-Joseph Gaultier de La Vérendrye, Christopher Gist, and Lawrence Washington.

== Plot ==
In the modern-day, the player is an unnamed Abstergo Entertainment employee tasked with researching the memories of Shay Patrick Cormac (Steven Piovesan), an Assassin who was active in the Thirteen Colonies during the French and Indian War. During their investigation, the player inadvertently trips a hidden memory file that infects the Animus servers. Abstergo is placed in lockdown, and the player must clean the Animus servers by living out Shay's memories.

In 1752, Shay is a new recruit to the Colonial Brotherhood of Assassins, whose potential is offset by his insubordination. While Shay trains with the North Atlantic chapter under the Assassin Mentor Achilles Davenport (Roger Aaron Brown), the Assassin Adéwalé (Tristan D. Lalla) arrives with news that Port-au-Prince was devastated by an earthquake during the search for a Precursor temple. Due to his experience captaining ships, Shay is tasked to retrieve a Precursor box and manuscript from the Templars. However, Shay begins to question the Assassins' motives after they refuse to engage in dialogue with the Templars, instead ordering Shay to assassinate them regardless of circumstance.

In 1754, after recovering the box and manuscript, Shay delivers them to Benjamin Franklin (Rick Jones), whose experiments on the box generate a map showing the locations of more Precursor temples around the world. Ordered to investigate a temple in Lisbon, Shay inadvertently triggers a devastating earthquake when he tries removing the artifact at its center, leaving him guilt-ridden and remorseful for of all the innocent lives he accidentally killed. Deducing that Port-au-Prince was destroyed similarly, Shay confronts Achilles, and is horrified to learn that Achilles intends to continue the search for Precursor artifacts, thereby endangering even more lives. Shay steals the manuscript and attempts to escape with it, but is cornered by the Brotherhood. Shay is shot and left for dead before he can destroy the manuscript.

Cast adrift, Shay is found by Colonel George Monro (Graham J. Cuthbertson), who saves him and leaves him in the care of Templar sympathizers in New York. After recovering in 1756, Shay cleans out Assassin-allied gangs that are extorting the citizenry, catching Monro's attention, who convinces Shay that he can improve the lives of others. Upon retaking his ship, the Morrigan, from the Assassins, and recruiting Christopher Gist (Richard M. Dumont) as his quartermaster, Shay agrees to assist his newfound Templar allies. After the Assassins kill Monro to steal back the manuscript, Shay realizes the Brotherhood has not given up the search for Precursor temples, and begins hunting down its members, becoming a high-ranking Templar in the process.

Over the following three years, Shay kills the Assassins Kesegowaase (Danny Blanco-Hall), Adéwalé, Hope Jensen (Patricia Summersett), and Louis-Joseph Gaultier de La Vérendrye (Marcel Jeannin), leaving only two prominent members of the Colonial Brotherhood: Achilles and his second-in-command, Liam O'Brien (Julian Casey), once Shay's best friend. In 1760, Shay and the Templar Grand Master Haytham Kenway (Adrian Hough) pursue the Assassins to the Arctic, where another Precursor temple has been located. After eliminating the Assassin expedition, Shay and Haytham enter the temple to find Liam and Achilles, who have realized that the artifacts are a means to stabilize the world, not a weapon to control it. During the confrontation, the artifact is accidentally destroyed, triggering another earthquake. As the four escape, Shay fatally injures Liam in a duel while Haytham overpowers Achilles. Shay persuades Haytham to spare Achilles, to ensure knowledge of the Temples is not lost, so the Assassins will not pursue them again. Haytham agrees, but cripples Achilles.

Tasked by Haytham to recover the Precursor box from the Assassins, Shay spends the next sixteen years tracking it down. In 1776, with Benjamin Franklin's help, Shay infiltrates the Palace of Versailles in France and kills the Assassin Charles Dorian to obtain the box. He reaffirms his commitment to the Templar cause, and suggests that the Templars should soon start their own revolution in response to the Assassins' recent actions in America.

In the present, Juhani Otso Berg (Andreas Apergis), a senior Templar, orders the player to upload Shay's memories to the Assassin servers, to weaken their resolve. The Brotherhood responds by cutting off communications. In a mid-credits scene, Berg thanks the player for their help, and gives them a choice: join the Templars, or die. The player's decision is not revealed.

== Development ==
By March 2014, a game code-named "Comet" was revealed to be in development, set for release on PlayStation 3 and Xbox 360. By the end of the month, additional reports indicated that "Comet" would be set around 1758 in New York, as well as feature sailing on the Atlantic Ocean. The game would be a direct sequel to Assassin's Creed IV: Black Flag, and would feature a Templar named Shay as the main protagonist. Haytham Kenway from Assassin's Creed III and Adéwalé from Black Flag would also make appearances.

The game was officially announced on August 5, 2014, following a leak of the title. Game director Martin Capel described the game as the conclusion to the series' "North American saga" and said that it was designed to accommodate specific fan requests, such as taking on the role of a Templar. The game is intended to "fill the gaps" of the story between Assassin's Creed III and Assassin's Creed IV: Black Flag and has "a crucial link" to the events of the previous games. In addition to Ubisoft Sofia's work on the game, contributions are also being made by Ubisoft studios in Singapore, Montreal, Quebec, Chengdu, Milan and Bucharest. Ubisoft also stated that the game was being envisioned without multiplayer components "at this stage", but did not rule out any modes being added after the game launched.

Writer Richard Farrese suggested that one of the exciting things about playing a Templar is that the player experienced "all of that from the other side", and now that they are part of the Templar Order as Shay, the game places the player in direct opposition against the chaos wrought by the Assassins. One of the key differences between both organizations, besides their philosophical differences, comes down to resources: Farrese explained that the Templars are well-heeled compared to the Assassins, and while they are not in control of the Colonial authorities at the onset of the French and Indian War, they are actively trying to manipulate them. The Templar Order's access to a wealth of resources is manifested through Shay's arsenal of rare and exotic weapons that either existed as prototypes during the era or were actually in use at the time.

Rogue incorporates the naval battles and exploration which were core gameplay mechanics in Black Flag. According to writer Susan Patrick, there is a thematic link between Shay Cormac and his ship, the Morrigan, as Cormac is a Gaelic name that means "raven" and The Morrigan is a goddess from Irish mythology associated with war and fate who is often depicted as a raven.

=== Writing ===
"Shay, he doesn't forfeit his humanity when he becomes a Templar. He simply decides to follow another cause. It does not turn him into a callous, mindless killer. Shay remains Shay. He has an emotional evolution throughout the game, but it's still him, he's simply changes his outlook. His loyalties remain the same."

— Ivan Balabanov, IGN

The core concept of Shay Cormac's story arc is based on the idea of a member of the Assassins having a change of heart and leaving as a result of a traumatic act of betrayal. Richard Farrese, one of the writers for Rogue, explained that the character is prompted to rethink his whole philosophy and his allegiance to the Assassins as a result of a cataclysmic event, and realizes that the Templars' goals and methods are much more in line with his own beliefs. Shay is depicted at the beginning of Rogue's narrative as a somewhat frivolous personality who does not take his role seriously due to his youth and lack of wisdom, though he is full of inner conflict as he questions the motivations of his leaders. Ivan Balabanov, producer and general manager of Ubisoft Sofia, describes Shay's character arc as a "transformation into this very somber, dedicated character who is pursuing his former comrades for something he genuinely believes is the better road". Balabanov further noted that "there are not many lines which Shay doesn't cross" and that Rogue was the most tragic of the franchise's titles to date.

Ubisoft staff have explained during interviews that Shay is not evil or ruthless at any point in the game's narrative, but rather the narrative focuses on Shay "as a human being, his story, why he's doing what he's doing, all in the context of demonstrating these gray areas". The development team wanted to create a relatable character whose actions create room for understanding, and that they deliberately avoid creating a "monodimensional, very flat character, a stereotypical bad guy who kills the good guys". Balabanov explained that "Shay is not somebody who, once he's made up his mind, he's forgotten what it's like to know these people. He knows who they are. He's regretful when he kills them". Producer Karl van der Luhe further elaborated that from Shay's perspective, it is not about "going to the dark side", but rather a case of him finding himself being aligned with the Templars' approach as he comes to a realization that their motives and strategy are more in-line with what he believes is right, and he joins to help push it further. Van der Luhe noted that the Templars and Assassins essentially want the same things and that their point of difference is their approach into getting there. Writer Susan Patrick suggested that by hunting down his former comrades, Shay is in fact seeking redemption.

== Marketing and release ==
Assassin's Creed Rogue was released for the PlayStation 3 and Xbox 360 on November 11, 2014, in North America; November 13, 2014, in most other regions; and November 14, 2014, in the United Kingdom, to coincide with the release of Assassin's Creed Unity for PlayStation 4, Windows, and Xbox One. A Windows version of Rogue was also released four months later, on March 10, 2015.

=== Retail editions ===
In addition to the standard edition of Rogue, Ubisoft released three different limited editions.

- The Collector's Edition features a retail copy of the game, a collector's box, a copy of the game's official soundtrack and artbook, three lithographs, and two exclusive in-game missions (The Siege of Fort de Sable and The Armor of Sir Gunn's Quest).
- The Artbook Edition is exclusive to PC and includes a retail copy of the game, a collector's box, and a copy of the game's official artbook, as well as a hardcase for the artbook.
- The Limited Edition features a retail copy of the game, the Ultimate Hunter Pack, and The Siege of Fort de Sable single-player mission.

=== Downloadable content ===
Four downloadable content packs were released for the PlayStation 3 and Xbox 360 versions of the game, each adding new weapons and/or customization options for Shay and the Morrigan: the Officer Pack, Commander Pack, Templar Pack, and Explorer Pack. All the downloadable content available for Rogue was later compiled into a single pack, titled the Templar Legacy Pack, which was released on January 13, 2015. Additionally, Ubisoft released four Time Saver packs (the Activities Pack, Collectibles Pack, Resources Pack, and Technology Pack), which provide the player with early in-game resources to upgrade the Morrigan and the locations of all collectibles in order to facilitate gameplay.

Through Ubisoft's Uplay system, players could redeem several in-game bonuses, including the Assassin Killer outfit, a Katana and Wakizashi weapon set, and customization items for the Morrigan inspired by the Jackdaw from Assassin's Creed IV: Black Flag.

=== Remastered ===
On January 11, 2018, Ubisoft announced a remastered version of Assassin's Creed Rogue, to be released for the PlayStation 4 and Xbox One on March 20. The remaster features enhanced visuals and all previously released downloadable content, as well as exclusive legacy outfits inspired by Jacob Frye from Assassin's Creed Syndicate, Aguilar de Nerha from the live-action Assassin's Creed film, and Bayek from Assassin's Creed Origins. The remastered version also includes support for UHD resolution on the PS4 Pro and Xbox One X.

=== Merchandise ===
In 2019, DAMTOYS released a figure of Shay Cormac, which stands at just over 12 inches tall and dressed in the character's signature robed outfit, with accessories such as pistol bags, bracers, and pouches. The action figure features nearly a dozen interchangeable hands, which allows for poses with different types of weapons.

== Reception ==
Reception

Aggregate score
Aggregator	Score
Metacritic	PS3: 72/100; X360: 72/100; PC: 74/100; PS4: 71/100; XONE: 71/100

Review scores
Publication	Score
Destructoid	5.5/10
Electronic Gaming Monthly	8.5/10
Eurogamer	8/10
Game Informer	8.25/10
GameSpot	6/10
GamesRadar+	2.5/5
GameTrailers	7.2/10
IGN	6.8/10
Joystiq	3/5
VideoGamer.com	7/10

Assassin's Creed Rogue received "mixed or average" reviews from critics, according to review aggregator website Metacritic.

Ray Carsillo from Electronic Gaming Monthly gave the game an 8.5/10, praising its interesting lead character, enjoyable story, new weapons introduced, new mission design, which requires players to prevent assassinations instead of carrying out assassinations like in other Assassin's Creed titles, as well as advanced and improved combat mechanics. However, he criticized poor pacing of the story, frequent bugs, lack of replayability and the lack of inclusion of a multiplayer mode. He concluded the review by saying that "Rogue is a far more pleasurable experience than I anticipated. It does just enough to put its own stamp on the franchise while also giving us critical story details in order to tie up loose ends between Assassin's Creed III and IV. It serves as a perfect conclusion to the series' time spent exploring Europe's North American colonies in the 18th century."

Eurogamer drew comparisons between Rogue and Assassin's Creed Revelations—a game which served to resolve storylines from Ezio Auditore's saga as a lead-in to Assassin's Creed III, due to its focus on expanding on characters and storylines introduced in III and Black Flag. Although noting that some settings, weapons, and mechanics had been reused from previous games in the series (such as an expansion of the New York City setting from III, naval combat, renovating buildings to build income, and locating enemies with a radar similar to the former multiplayer mode), the use of Assassins as an enemy was considered to be a "much-needed new [idea] to the series' fighting mechanics" due to their use of tactics that were used by the player themselves in previous games (such as smoke bombs and hiding), and that Rogue felt the most "fresh" whilst exploring its new North Atlantic overworld. However, the story missions themselves and single player campaign overall were criticized for being noticeably shorter than in previous games.

Matt Miller from Game Informer gave the game an 8.25/10. He praised the huge variety of activities, varied environments, and mission types, new additions and well-performed gameplay, despite being too similar to its predecessors. He criticized the repetitive melee combat and the absence of multiplayer mode. He described the game by saying that "Rogue is vast with lots to explore, and while it lacks novelty, it offers a wealth of gameplay and lore to faithful fans." Daniel Bloodworth from GameTrailers gave the game a 7.2/10, praising the return of some old characters in the Assassin's Creed series, stunning scenery and environment, interesting interceptions missions, but criticizing the predictable and dull lead character, poorly constructed missions in the beginning of the game, disappointing boss battles, as well as numerous bugs. He described the game by saying that "Rogue in many ways feels like an extension of last year's Black Flag, even down to the menus, but there are some tweaks to the formula thanks to your new role as a former assassin, hunting down his old comrades."

Daniel Krupa from IGN gave the game a 6.8/10. He praised the engaging story, atmospheric scenery, but criticized the lack of Templar abilities included, bland encounters with other main characters, uninspired side quests, empty world, as well as the frustrating combat and traversal system, which he stated has shown no improvements. He also criticized the game for not encouraging the player to explore the world. Mark Walton from GameSpot gave the game a 6/10, criticizing the predictable story, unlikeable lead character, lack of interesting missions, as well as being thin on core content. He stated that the game feels like a glorified Black Flag DLC pack and has done nothing to put the franchise forward. Xav de Matos from Joystiq gave the game a 6/10, criticizing the game for not adding anything new to the franchise. He stated that "Assassin's Creed Rogue is essentially a clone of Black Flag's setting and systems. If you can accept rampant copy-and-paste in another full priced entry, you'll more than likely enjoy what Assassin's Creed Rogue has to offer."

Critical commentary often focused on the nuanced characterization of Shay's humanity. Andy Kelly from PC Gamer praised Shay as a "tough and ruthless" character who refuses to prey on the weak and occasionally shows mercy, and that more "nuanced and flawed" lead characters like him should appear in the Assassin's Creed series. Mitch Dyer from IGN found that Shay was a layered and sympathetic protagonist rather than an expected "cold-blooded killer", making for one of the most engaging stories in the series for several years. Stephen Totilo from Kotaku considered him to be one of the most interesting protagonists in the series whose character arc is satisfyingly told through playable missions. Softpedia's review of Rogue praised Shay as one of the most complex characters in the series, possessing charisma and conflicting morality, and thought that one could not find fault with his actions. Marshall Honorof from Tom's Guide thought Steven Piovesan convincingly portrays Shay as thoughtful and conflicted. The Irish accent Piovesan uses for the character on the other hand has attracted criticism, particularly from Irish publications.

In a retrospective examination of Rogue published by Gamingbolt in September 2020, Shubhankar Parijat said Shay's transformation from young Assassin to Master Templar remains "fascinating to see". Parijat said Rogue's storyline, which revolves around Shay's personal conflict with his former friends and allies, seeing him being forced to view things in different ways, watching him interact with and form closer bonds with his newfound comrades in the Templars, deserves a special place in the Assassin's Creed series.

=== Themes ===
"You did that kind of thing before to someone like the character you're controlling now and felt good about it. You feel righteous now. Maybe you weren't the good guys before, after all."

— Stephen Totilo, "Games Let You Become Your Own Worst Enemy"

Writing for the New York Times, Totilo commented that while Shay "theoretically turns full-on bad guy" when he joins the Templars, who are the overarching antagonists in the majority of the Assassin's Creed media franchise, he noted that Rogue still allow players to feel like the "good guy". To Totilo, the creators of Rogue have provided a clear signal to players on the issue of morality, and noted that the opportunity to play as a bona fide "bad guy" in a video game is a rare perspective, much less asking players to consider that they're wrong or to feel good about what they're doing while identifying with an unsavory group. Shay's status as one of the few Templar characters who is portrayed sympathetically in the series is discussed by Lars de Wildt in the 2019 book Playing Utopia: Futures in Digital Games. Shay's tampering of a Precursor artifact as directed by the Assassin leadership, which inadvertently triggers The Great Lisbon Earthquake event in Rogue's narrative, is cited as an example of the exploration of the theme of theodicy in popular media by author Frank G. Bosman.

=== Sales ===
As of December 31, 2014, Ubisoft had shipped a combined 10 million copies of Assassin's Creed Unity and Assassin's Creed Rogue.
