= Assassin's Creed Freedom Cry =

2013 video game

- Developer: Ubisoft Quebec
- Publisher: Ubisoft
- Director: Amanda Wyatt
- Artist: Raphael Lacoste
- Writer: Jill Murray
- Composer: Olivier Deriviere
- Series: Assassin's Creed
- Engine: AnvilNext
- Platforms: PlayStation 3; Xbox 360; PlayStation 4; Windows; Xbox One; Nintendo Switch; Google Stadia
- Release: December 17, 2013: DLC release: PlayStation 3, PlayStation 4, Xbox 360, Xbox One December 17, 2013 Windows December 19, 2013 Nintendo Switch December 6, 2019 Stadia September 14, 2021 Standalone release: PlayStation 3, PlayStation 4 February 18, 2014 Windows February 25, 2014
- Genres: Action-adventure, stealth
- Mode: Single-player

Assassin's Creed Freedom Cry is an action-adventure video game developed by Ubisoft Quebec and published by Ubisoft. Set in the French colony of Saint-Domingue (present-day Haiti) between 1735 and 1737, Freedom Cry follows Adéwalé, a prominent supporting character from the 2013 title Assassin's Creed IV: Black Flag. While attempting to disrupt Templar activities in the Caribbean Sea on behalf of their rival organization, the Brotherhood of Assassins, Adéwalé finds himself shipwrecked in Saint-Domingue, where he comes face-to-face with some of the most brutal slavery practices in the West Indies.

Originally released as a post-launch downloadable content (DLC) expansion pack titled Assassin's Creed IV: Black Flag — Freedom Cry, a standalone version that does not require the base game of Black Flag was released for Microsoft Windows, PlayStation 3, and PlayStation 4 in February 2014. In December 2019, the game was re-released on the Nintendo Switch as part of a compilation titled Assassin's Creed: The Rebel Collection, which also includes Black Flag and its successor, Assassin's Creed Rogue. The story campaign of Freedom Cry, which takes place fifteen years after the events of Black Flag, is loosely connected to its narrative but retains most of its core gameplay mechanics. Writer Jill Murray served as the lead writer for Freedom Cry, while French musician Olivier Deriviere composed the game's soundtrack, replacing Brian Tyler, the composer employed for the base game.

The Xbox One version of Freedom Cry received favorable reviews from video game publications, whereas the overall reception of the PlayStation 4 and Xbox 360 versions was less positive. Critics generally praised the game's storytelling and the decision to focus on an already established side character, but were disappointed by its short length and the lack of substantial gameplay improvements over Black Flag. Freedom Cry has been retrospectively assessed as a notable depiction of the slave narrative genre in the video game medium.

== Gameplay ==
Freedom Cry is a single-player action-adventure, stealth game set in an open world structure and played from a third-person perspective in both land and sea environments. Players assume the role of Adéwalé, a former slave from Trinidad who served as the quartermaster of Black Flag protagonist Edward Kenway onboard his ship the Jackdaw before joining the Brotherhood of Assassins. Like Black Flag, Freedom Cry features naval combat where players may engage, board, and capture passing ships. From Adéwalé's ship, which is upgradeable throughout the game using in-game currency and resources, players may examine distant ships along with their cargo and strength using a spyglass.

A new gameplay mechanic introduced in Freedom Cry is the freeing of African Slaves. Each freed slave serves as a resource for the player to accumulate in order to unlock upgrades for Adéwalé's personal armaments and equipment at his base of operations. Players may utilize a similar recruit system introduced in Black Flag to enlist recruited Maroons to fight by Adéwalé's side. Players will encounter opportunities for Adéwalé to liberate slaves and fighting alongside Maroons through procedurally generated instances, raids on colonial plantations, or story missions.

== Plot ==
In 1735, while leading an attack on a Templar convoy in the West Indies, Adéwalé (Tristan D. Lalla) manages to recover a package containing an ancient artifact. Still, his ship, the Victoire, is caught in a violent storm shortly afterwards. Adéwalé awakens off the coast of Saint-Domingue and finds himself within the vicinity of its capital city of Port-au-Prince. Aware that the Templars were meant to deliver the artifact to a woman named Bastienne Josèphe (Mariah Inger), Adéwalé discovers that she is the madame of a local brothel. He confronts Bastienne, who discloses that she is secretly a sympathizer to the Maroons, a group of freedom fighters made up of liberated slaves, and that she uses the money paid to her by the Templars to free slaves in the region. Bastienne persuades Adéwalé to aid the Maroon cause; he meets their leader Augustin Dieufort (Christian Paul), and commandeers a new ship called the Experto Crede to disrupt the regional slave trade.

While working for Bastienne, Adéwalé learns that the governor of Port-au-Prince, Pierre de Fayet (Marcel Jeannin), is planning a clandestine expedition to gather geographical data which would facilitate navigation and the slave trade. Adéwalé infiltrates the expedition by replacing its illiterate slaves with literate Maroons to procure the data sought by the governor. Bastienne objects to Adéwalé's plan for further raids against the slave trade and claims that de Fayet will punish the imprisoned slaves in retaliation for the Maroon offensive. Adéwalé ignores her, but later witnesses a French naval frigate fire upon an unarmed slave ship to prevent the slaves from joining the Maroons. Adéwalé saves a few of the slaves from drowning, but the ship ultimately capsizes, killing the rest.

Vowing vengeance, Adéwalé infiltrates de Fayet's mansion and assassinates him. Before dying, the governor claims that slaves are subhuman and incapable of self-governance and will naturally turn to violence in the absence of their masters' guidance. After handing the artifact—revealed to be a Precursor box (Note: This is the same box later seen in Assassin's Creed Rogue.)—over to Bastienne, Adéwalé leaves Port-au-Prince and returns to the Assassins, but pledges to continue aiding the oppressed within the region.

== Development and release ==
The lead writer of Freedom Cry is Jill Murray, who also wrote Assassin's Creed III: Liberation and the Aveline DLC add-on for Black Flag. Other members of the writing team for Freedom Cry included Melissa MacCoubrey, Hugo Giard and Wesley Pincombe. The score for Freedom Cry was composed by Olivier Deriviere. It was recorded at Avatar Studios in New York with La Troupe Makandal, a dedicated group for Haitian music, and at Galaxy Studios in Belgium with the Brussels Philharmonic.

Freedom Cry was originally released in December 2013 as a DLC expansion pack for the Microsoft Windows, PlayStation 3, PlayStation 4, Xbox 360, and Xbox One versions of Black Flag. In February 2014, it was announced that Freedom Cry would be released as a standalone title on the PlayStation 3 and PlayStation 4 on February 18, 2014, for North America and February 19, 2014, for Europe. It was later released for the PC on February 25, 2014. Along with Black Flag and Assassin's Creed Rogue, Freedom Cry was included as part of Assassin's Creed: The Rebel Collection for the Nintendo Switch, which was released on December 6, 2019. The game was released for Google Stadia on September 14, 2021, as part of Assassin's Creed Black Flag Gold Edition.

== Reception ==
Reception

Aggregate score
Aggregator	Score
Metacritic	(PS4) 71/100 (X360) 73/100 (XONE) 76/100

Review scores
Publication	Score
Electronic Gaming Monthly	8/10
Eurogamer	7/10
GameRevolution	8/10
GameSpot	6/10
Hardcore Gamer	8/10
IGN	7.8/10
Official Xbox Magazine (UK)	8/10

According to review aggregator Metacritic, Freedom Cry was generally well received on Xbox One, whereas the PlayStation 4 and Xbox 360 versions scored slightly lower with mixed or average reviews.

In a 2014 review, Electronic Gaming Monthly lauded the story of Freedom Cry as the "most powerful, poignant tale" in the Assassin’s Creed universe and the DLC pack's singular highlight, and noted that it was unusual to feature a side character as the player avatar. Hardcore Gamer concurred that the DLC pack is an excellent supplement to the base game, and praised the story of Freedom Cry as worth experiencing across an engaging setting. The UK edition of Official Xbox Magazine thought the otherwise nice extra story "suffers a little from resetting and restarting progress", but otherwise welcomed the additional downloadable content for Black Flag. Eurogamer considered Freedom Cry's greatest asset to be its "strong, self-contained narrative". Conversely, GameSpot was troubled by the DLC pack's handling of the dark themes surrounding slave narratives.

Much of the criticism focused on the game's size and scope compared to Black Flag as well as aspects of its gameplay mechanics. Electronic Gaming Monthly thought Freedom Cry felt "paltry" compared to the base game. IGN described Freedom Cry to be "an entire Assassin's Creed game distilled into five hours", but claimed that its mechanics have omitted much of the forward thinking decisions that kept Black Flag relevant at the time of its release. Eurogamer commented that gameplay mechanics "remain resolutely locked up" to the Assassin's Creed framework, and claimed that player weariness in response to its over-familiarity ultimately undermines its strong narrative. On the other hand, Game Revolution found no flaw with the presentation of its gameplay, which is asserted to be the fundamental draw of the DLC pack as opposed to the story of its protagonist, Adéwalé.

In February 2015, Murray, MacCoubrey, Giard and Pincombe jointly received a Writers Guild of America Awards nomination in the 67th edition for the screenplay and story of Freedom Cry.
