= Assassin's Creed III =

2012 action-adventure video game

- Developer: Ubisoft Montreal
- Publisher: Ubisoft
- Director: Alex Hutchinson
- Writer: Corey May
- Composer: Lorne Balfe
- Series: Assassin's Creed
- Engine: AnvilNext
- Platforms: PlayStation 3; Xbox 360; Wii U; Microsoft Windows; Remastered; Microsoft Windows; PlayStation 4; Xbox One; Nintendo Switch; Google Stadia
- Release: October 30, 2012: PlayStation 3, Xbox 360; NA: October 30, 2012; EU: October 31, 2012; AU: October 31, 2012 Wii U; NA: November 18, 2012; EU: November 30, 2012; AU: November 30, 2012 Microsoft Windows; NA: November 20, 2012; AU: November 22, 2012; EU: November 23, 2012 Remastered Windows, PS4, Xbox One; WW: March 29, 2019 Nintendo Switch; WW: May 21, 2019 Google Stadia; WW: December 14, 2021
- Genres: Action-adventure, stealth
- Modes: Single-player, multiplayer (Note: Not present in remastered version; legacy multiplayer servers were shut down in late 2022.)

Assassin's Creed III is a 2012 action-adventure game developed by Ubisoft Montreal and published by Ubisoft. It is the fifth major installment in the Assassin's Creed series, and a direct sequel to 2011's Assassin's Creed Revelations. The game was released worldwide for PlayStation 3 and Xbox 360, beginning in North America on October 30, 2012, with a Wii U and Microsoft Windows release in November 2012. A remastered version of the game was released in 2019 for Windows, PlayStation 4, Xbox One and Nintendo Switch, and in 2021 for Google Stadia.

The game's plot is set in a fictional history of real-world events and follows the millennia-old struggle between the Assassins, who fight to preserve peace and free will, and the Templars, who desire peace through control. The framing story is set in the 21st century and features series protagonist Desmond Miles using a machine known as the Animus to relive the memories of his ancestors and find a way to avert the 2012 apocalypse. The main narrative is set in 18th-century Colonial America from 1754 to 1783, and follows two characters whose stories are interconnected: Haytham Kenway, a British Templar who attempts to build a presence for his Order in the colonies during the French and Indian War; and Ratonhnhaké:ton / Connor, Haytham's half-Mohawk son, who becomes an Assassin to protect his people and avenge his mother's death, and battles the Templars' attempts to influence the outcome of the American Revolution.

Assassin's Creed III is set in an open world and presented from the third-person perspective, with a primary focus on using each playable character's combat and stealth abilities to eliminate targets and explore the environment. Connor is able to freely explore 18th-century Boston, New York City, and the American frontier to complete side missions away from the primary storyline. The game also features a multiplayer component, allowing players to compete online to complete solo and team-based objectives including assassinations and evading pursuers. Ubisoft developed a new game engine, AnvilNext, for the game. Assassin's Creed III was one of the first major video game releases to prominently feature Mohawk people (Mohawk: Kanienʼkehá꞉ka), an Iroquoian-speaking Indigenous people of North America. The team sought to capture Mohawk culture as authentically as possible and consulted with cultural experts about the depiction of Connor and other Mohawk characters. A number of downloadable content (DLC) packs were released to support Assassin's Creed III, including The Tyranny of King Washington, a story expansion set in an alternate timeline from the base game's events.

The game received positive reviews from critics, who praised it for its gameplay, narrative, setting, and ambitious scale, while criticism was directed at the unevenly developed gameplay mechanics, mission design, and pacing. It was a commercial success, selling more than 12 million copies worldwide. Assassin's Creed III was released alongside a spin-off for the PlayStation Vita titled Assassin's Creed III: Liberation. A sequel, Assassin's Creed IV: Black Flag, was released in October 2013. While its modern-day narrative continues from the events of Assassin's Creed III, the main plot is set during the Golden Age of Piracy in the early 18th century and follows Haytham's father and Connor's grandfather, Edward Kenway. Another prequel, Assassin's Creed Rogue, detailing the rise and fall of the Templars and Assassins in Colonial America, respectively, was released in November 2014.

== Gameplay ==
Assassin's Creed III features new gameplay elements such as hunting and dual wielding of weaponry. Here the protagonist Connor uses two weapons, a tomahawk and a flintlock pistol, against a group of redcoats.

Assassin's Creed III is an action-adventure, stealth game set in an open world environment and played from a third-person perspective. The main narrative of the game follows Ratonhnaké:ton, also known as Connor, an 18th-century Assassin from Colonial America, and his involvement in various events during the American Revolution and the Revolutionary War. In the game's prologue, consisting of the first three main sequences, players control Connor's father Haytham Kenway, the leader of the Colonial Templars, while in the modern-day sequences, the player character is series protagonist Desmond Miles, who searches for a way to protect the Earth from an upcoming solar flare on December 21, 2012. The game world consists of three main areas: Boston, New York City, and a large wilderness known as the Frontier. Portions of the Eastern Seaboard and Caribbean Sea can be explored during the naval side missions.

Free running has been simplified to allow for more fluid parkour in the cities and wilderness, such as climbing and running on trees, mountains, cliffs, etc. Close combat has been modified, allowing Connor to dual-wield weapons and take down multiple opponents at once, and players no longer need to manage the lock-on mechanic. Connor has access to a wide range of weapons which include muskets, swords, pistols, native weapons such as the tomahawk and bow and arrow, the Rope Dart (used to pull foes or hang them from above), and the Assassins' signature Hidden Blades. Human shields can be used against firing lines of enemies. Medicine is no longer used as health recovers automatically. Stealth is revamped, allowing players to use natural elements such as tall grass and trees to hide, along with the ability to blend between any two people.

Assassin's Creed III features weather simulations such as snow, fog, and rain. The seasons can change i.e., Summer and Winter, which affect visuals and gameplay. Snowfall can reduce visibility for the player and enemies, aiding stealth. The game features a wide variety of animals, both domestic (such as horses, cows, and dogs) and wild (deer, wolves, bears, etc.). Wild animals are found in the Frontier and can be hunted for meat or marrow in order to be sold. The quality of the kill determines the price, encouraging the player to hunt silently. For this, traps and bait can be used.

The economy is based on the Davenport Homestead, which acts as Connor's adoptive home. The site can be visited by people such as carpenters, tailors, etc., suffering from displacement due to the war. Helping and interacting with these non-player characters (NPCs) encourages them to settle in the Homestead. From there on, the player can craft various items and trade with them, and sell the goods to the cities via caravan. The player can help them build relationships with each other, which will result in the formation of a small community.

A revamped version of the recruitment system introduced in Assassin's Creed: Brotherhood returns as players can enlist citizens to the Assassins' cause by completing optional "Liberation" missions. Unlike previous games, the player is limited to six Assassin recruits, but these recruits are each given distinct personalities and backstories, and have a much larger skill set, allowing them to start riots, provide a cover escort, and set up an ambush, among others. Other side missions include collecting Benjamin Franklin's lost Almanac pages, exploring underground tunnels to unlock fast-travel stations, joining hunting and fighting clubs, investigating various frontiersman rumors like UFOs and Sasquatches, and "peg-legs" missions in which Connor goes to various forts and wastelands to uncover the legend of Captain Kidd's treasure. In addition, minigames such as Bowls, Checkers, Fanorona, and Nine men's morris are playable for the first time in the series.

Assassin's Creed III introduces naval gameplay to the series. During the main story, Connor captains a brig, the Aquila, and is given the opportunity to upgrade it with improved weapons and hull armor. Control of the ship relies on environmental factors such as wind direction and speed, local presence of storms, high waves, and rocks. Engagements are by cannon, with broadsides covering both flanks of the ship, swivel guns that can be used to damage smaller ships which can be boarded to find treasure, and chain shots that can instantly take down the masts of larger ships and disable them. The Aquila is usable only during a few main story missions and a series of dedicated side missions.

The Wii U version of the game has a few extra features, such as the ability to change weapons on the go and the map being always visible on the Wii U GamePad. This version also supports Off TV Play, which redirects the main screen to the Wii U Gamepad.

Online multiplayer returns in this installment, developed by Ubisoft Annecy. Along with returning modes, new ones feature a co-operative mode named Wolfpack, in which 1–4 players are charged with killing certain NPCs within a time limit, through a sequence of 25 stages. It features Domination, a team mode where players will have to capture certain areas of the map, protecting them from the opposing team. Ubisoft announced that the multiplayer servers for Assassin's Creed III, alongside several other of their older titles, would be shut down on September 1, 2022. The date was later delayed to October 1, 2022.

The Remastered version of the game features revamped mechanics. Players can whistle from anywhere while hidden, whereas the original version only allowed whistling from corners. Double assassinations have been improved so as not to require entering high-profile mode to do so. Free-aiming with ranged weapons was made possible, allowing Connor more control over his bow and pistols. The mini-map and the UI were upgraded with better-looking and easier-to-recognize icons for ease of accessibility, figuring out where enemies will point next and features color-blind modes. The crafting system and the economy system were also vastly upgraded. The game's lighting system has been upgraded to resemble the new technology implemented in Assassin's Creed Origins, and the textures have been revamped to resemble those seen in the Assassin's Creed games utilizing the more advanced AnvilNext 2.0 engine.

== Synopsis ==
=== Setting ===
Following the conclusion of the "Ezio Trilogy" with Assassin's Creed Revelations, Assassin's Creed III shifts focus towards a new historical time period: 18th-century Colonial America. The game follows two new protagonists: Haytham Kenway, a British nobleman and high-ranking member of the Templar Order, who is sent to America to establish a strong Templar presence on the continent and find an ancient temple built by the First Civilization; and Ratonhnhaké:ton, also known as Connor, Haytham's half-Mohawk son, who joins the Assassins to avenge the burning of his village and his mother's death and stop the Templars from gaining control of the colonies.

Haytham's story serves as a prologue to the main narrative, and takes place from 1754 to 1755, at the onset of the French and Indian War, which paved the way for the American Revolution. Connor's story spans two decades of his life, from his childhood in 1760 to 1783, and involves major events from the American Revolution and the Revolutionary War seen from Connor's perspective. Boston and New York City are cities that can be explored, alongside the American Colonial Frontier, spanning forest, cliffs, rivers, Connor's village, and the settlements of Lexington and Concord. The player can hunt small and large animals, and approximately one-third of the story takes place in the Frontier. The city of Philadelphia can also be visited at one point during the game, as can The Caribbean during several naval missions. The Eastern seaboard is explorable via Connor's captaining of his warship, the Aquila.

Like previous games in the series, the story includes segments set during the modern day, in 2012, which again follow Desmond Miles and his efforts to save humanity from an impending disaster. These segments have been expanded significantly, and involve short missions that the player must complete to advance the narrative. Locations visited during the modern-day missions include a skyscraper in Manhattan, New York; a stadium in São Paulo, Brazil; and Abstergo's facility in Rome, Italy.

The game setting has been described as one of the very few depictions of historical French Louisiana in video games.

=== Characters ===
Assassin's Creed III features a large cast of characters. The modern-day sections feature many returning characters from the previous four games in the series, including protagonist Desmond Miles (Nolan North), his estranged father William (John de Lancie), and friends Shaun Hastings (Danny Wallace) and Rebecca Crane (Eliza Schneider). During the missions he carries out, Desmond is hunted by the Templar Daniel Cross (Danny Blanco-Hall), who was dispatched by Warren Vidic (Phil Proctor), the head scientist of Abstergo Industries—a corporate conglomerate used as a front by the modern-day Templar Order. Desmond crosses paths with Minerva (Margaret Easley) and Juno (Nadia Verrucci), members of a precursor race known as the First Civilization (or "Those Who Came Before"), who try to help him save humanity from the same catastrophic event that wiped out their race.

The main protagonist of the game is Ratonhnhaké:ton (Noah Watts), also known as Connor, a half-English, half-Mohawk Assassin born in 18th-century Colonial America. Connor's supporting cast includes Achilles Davenport (Roger Aaron Brown), Connor's mentor and a retired Assassin; his mother Kaniehtí:io (Kaniehtiio Horn); his first mate aboard the Aquila, Robert Faulkner (Kevin McNally); and French taverner Stephane Chapheau (Shawn Baichoo), Connor's first Assassin recruit. During the game, Connor battles the Colonial Templars, led by his father, Haytham Kenway (Adrian Hough), who is playable in the first three sequences of the game. Haytham is aided by several historical figures portrayed here as members of the Templar Order, including Charles Lee (Neil Napier), William Johnson (Julian Casey), John Pitcairn (Robert Lawrenson), Thomas Hickey (Allen Leech), Benjamin Church (Harry Standjofski), and Nicholas Biddle (Fred Tatasciore). The era also features several other historical figures such as George Washington (Robin Atkin Downes), Samuel Adams (Mark Lindsay Chapman), Israel Putnam (Andreas Apergis), Thomas Jefferson (John Emmet Tracy), Benjamin Franklin (Jim Ward), Edward Braddock (Carlo Mestroni), Mason Weems (Tod Fennell), Paul Revere (Bruce Dinsmore), and the Marquis de Lafayette (Vince Corazza).

=== Plot ===
Following the events of Assassin's Creed: Revelations, Desmond, William, Shaun, and Rebecca find the Grand Temple in a cave in New York and access it using their Apple of Eden. As Juno begins to communicate with him, Desmond enters the Animus to deal with his dissociative fugue, where Juno's influence causes him to experience the memories of his ancestor, Haytham Kenway. In 1754, Haytham assassinates a patron at the Royal Opera House to steal a key. Instructed by his Order to find the Temple they believe it opens, Haytham travels to the American Colonies and recruits several allies to aid his expedition. In the process, he meets and falls in love with a Mohawk woman, Kaniehti:io, who enlists his help to eliminate Edward Braddock, one of Haytham's former comrades who has been leading attacks against the Mohawk people. After killing Braddock, Kaniehti:io takes Haytham to the Grand Temple, but the key proves useless. Haytham officially inducts Charles Lee into his Order, which is revealed to be the Templar Order.

Deducing the key is meant to open the Temple's inner chambers, Desmond relives the memories of Ratonhnhaké:ton, Haytham and Kaniehti:io's son, to find it. In 1760, Kaniehti:io dies during an attack on their village, which Ratonhnhaké:ton assumes was ordered by Charles Lee. In 1769, the village elder informs Ratonhnhaké:ton of their tribe's duty to protect the Temple, and gives him a Crystal Ball which allows Juno to communicate with him. Juno leads Ratonhnhaké:ton to retired Assassin Achilles Davenport, whose Brotherhood collapsed years earlier, and he reluctantly agrees to train him. At Achilles' suggestion, Ratonhnhaké:ton renames himself Connor to move more freely throughout the colonies.

Over the following years, Connor is drawn into the American Revolution and the Revolutionary War as he attempts to protect his people and keep the Revolution free of the Templars' influence. After assassinating most of Haytham's allies, Connor meets his father and works with him to eliminate a rogue Templar. Later, Haytham discovers George Washington's plan to displace indigenous populations suspected of supporting the Loyalists, including Connor's tribe. Haytham reveals that Washington ordered the attack that killed Kaniehti:io, causing Connor to angrily break ties with both of them. Returning to his village, he learns Lee recruited Mohawk warriors to turn back the Patriots sent to eradicate them, and is forced to kill his childhood friend Kanen'tó:kon to avert conflict.

In the present, Desmond retrieves batteries from Manhattan and Brazil to activate the Temple, while being hunted by the Templar Daniel Cross. After William is captured while trying to recover the final battery, Desmond storms Abstergo's headquarters in Rome, kills Cross and Warren Vidic, and rescues his father, reconciling with him.

Connor becomes conflicted about eliminating the Templars and hopes to work with Haytham toward peace and freedom. However, Haytham remains convinced of the necessity to control the nation by replacing Washington with Lee. Lee is disgraced by Washington for attempting to sabotage the outcome of the Battle of Monmouth and takes refuge in Fort George. Connor infiltrates the fort, but is confronted by Haytham and reluctantly kills him. Connor eventually tracks down and assassinates Lee, retrieving the key given to him by Haytham. Returning to his village, Connor finds it abandoned and the Crystal Ball left behind. Instructed by Juno to conceal the key, Connor buries it in the grave of Achilles' son, Connor Davenport.

Desmond retrieves the key and accesses the Temple's inner chambers, where Juno reveals that he can save the world at the cost of his own life. Minerva appears, opposing the plan as it will free Juno, who was sealed in the Temple to prevent her from conquering humanity. Juno explains that if the solar flare occurs, Desmond will become a messiah-like figure to other survivors and will be revered as a god after his death, but will have his legacy manipulated to control future generations. Desmond chooses to sacrifice himself to save humanity and give them the opportunity to fight Juno.

An epilogue scene set in 1783 details the end of Connor's journey. Despite eliminating the Colonial Templars and ensuring the Revolution's success, Connor feels that he failed to protect his people, who are still being oppressed. Nevertheless, he resolves to continue fighting for a better future. (Note: In a cut ending monologue, Connor acknowledges that Haytham was right about the Founding Fathers only pursuing their own interests, and regrets being unable to reconcile with his father or unite the Assassins and Templars in their goals. However, he refuses to accept defeat, believing the Assassins will one day succeed and humanity will change for the better. This monologue is included in the novel Assassin's Creed: Forsaken.) In the present, a voiceover directs the player to locate several 'pivot points' across the virtual representation of Colonial America. Once collected, the voiceover informs them that they have connected to the cloud.

== Development ==
=== Origins ===
Work on Assassin's Creed III began in January 2010, after the release of Assassin's Creed II, by a senior team of Ubisoft developers. It was in development for two and a half years and had the longest development cycle since the first Assassin's Creed. The project involved more than 300 people in Montreal who worked with other teams in Quebec City, France, Singapore and Ukraine. When Ubisoft revealed Assassin's Creed: Brotherhood in 2010, as new details came to light, there was some confusion within the gaming community as to whether this would be Assassin's Creed III. According to the developers, Brotherhood was not Assassin's Creed III, and the third installment would not star a "pre-existing character." Ubisoft Montreal's developers stated in their interviews that Assassin's Creed III would be released eventually.

Jean-François Boivin of Ubisoft stated that each numbered title in the series will introduce a lead character and a setting. Patrice Désilets, the former creative director of the series, said that Assassin's Creed had always been planned as a trilogy. He commented on the story of Assassin's Creed III, saying that it would focus on Assassins' quest to prevent the end of the world in 2012, and their race against time to find temples and Apples of Eden built by "Those Who Came Before". Desmond would be searching for clues as to the locations of these temples, by exploring memories of one (or more) of his other ancestors. From interviews with Désilets and creative director Alex Hutchinson, the original plan for the ending of Assassin's Creed III when it was only planned out as a trilogy was to have Desmond and Lucy take down Abstergo in the days before the solar flare stuck. Desmond would have used the knowledge that he gained from Altair and Ezio as part of this. The game would then have ended as the solar flare brought about the end of the world, but with Desmond and Lucy on a spaceship to restart humanity elsewhere similarly to Adam & Eve; Lucy's name was based on that of Lucy, the fossilized remains of what was believed to be one of the first hominini creatures in allusion to starting a new society. However, this ending significantly changed after the success of Assassin's Creed II, which saw additional spinoffs before work started on the third main game. Désilets and Hutchinson opted to close out Desmond's story but avoided the cataclysmic scenario as to allow further games in the series.

In October 2011, Alexandre Amacio, creative director of Assassin's Creed: Revelations, announced that the next installment of the franchise was to be released before December 2012; however, Amacio himself would not be directing the game. This comes from the idea that Desmond Miles, the modern-day protagonist of the series, was to finish his tale by December 2012. Amacio said that gamers should not have to play a futuristic game after the time period in which it is set.

=== Pre-announcement ===
Ubisoft CEO Yves Guillemot confirmed during an earnings call on November 8, 2011, that a new "major" Assassin's Creed game would be released in 2012. Guillemot refused to go into any further detail on the title beyond its confirmation. Speaking to MCV, Guillemot dismissed the notion that annual Assassin's Creed installments are diluting the brands, stating instead that they are necessary to "satisfy the demand". Guillemot claimed in the same interview that that year's Assassin's Creed will be the series' "biggest to date."

In February 2012, Ubisoft confirmed the existence of Assassin's Creed III, and its North American release date of October 30, 2012. Guillemot described Assassin's Creed III as "the true next generation of both the Assassin's Creed brand and interactive entertainment/storytelling in general. We will push the title a lot because it's a fantastic product that the team has been working on for three years. What we have seen is just fabulous." Guillemot went on to say the publisher was investing more heavily in the game than in any other title in the series.

==== Internal leaks ====
An early screenshot of Assassin's Creed III showing Connor paddling a canoe. This feature is not present in the final version of the game.

Reports that Assassin's Creed III would take place during the American Revolution surfaced following a supposed "inside source" at Ubisoft, who made such a claim in January 2012. On February 29, 2012, an upcoming promotional image of the game was sent to Kotaku by a Best Buy employee, along with information from the retailer that a full reveal was imminent. Around the same time, Ubisoft mentioned "a major announcement from Assassin's Creed" was "only days away" via the series' official Facebook. The page's cover photo depicted a snowy and bleak setting. Furthermore, Game Informer appeared ready to confirm the details via an advertising banner posted on its site. Images showed the new assassin standing next to American revolutionary leader George Washington.

Following the reports, Ubisoft released Assassin's Creed III's box art on March 1, 2012, which confirmed the game's American Revolution setting. The company said it would announce "all the details" at 5pm on March 5. Additionally, Game Informer revealed its cover feature, which included more artwork of the game's new main character. On March 2, several screenshots were leaked ahead of Ubisoft's reveal, and the first gameplay details emerged via Game Informer.

=== Post-announcement ===
Assassin's Creed III was unveiled with a cinematic trailer on March 5, 2012. Ubisoft described the game as the "most ambitious" project in the company's history, with twice the production capacity of any of its previous titles. The game's engine, AnvilNext, delivers improved visuals, character models and AI, allowing for battlefields full of fighters. Ubisoft later said it is aiming to make Assassin's Creed III "look next-gen" on current-gen consoles using the new AnvilNext engine.

Ubisoft said that when Rockstar's Red Dead Redemption released midway through Assassin's Creed III's development, it was surprising to see Rockstar had included wild animal hunting and a giant frontier to explore—features both planned for its own sequel. Lead writer Corey May said that Ubisoft began looking at Red Dead's success and trying to take the formula in "new directions". Similarities between these two games are down to "a convergence of minds", said Assassin's Creed III writer Matt Turner. Creative director Alex Hutchinson said Ubisoft steered clear of making the Assassin's Creed III protagonist a female character because the game's setting was not a strong match. Hutchinson said that, while many people wanted to see female Assassins in the series, the American Revolution setting made it difficult.

Haytham's inclusion as a playable character was kept secret from the press and was only known to the development team, with all advertisement solely focusing on Connor. Looking back on the game in 2019, Alex Hutchinson named the decision to make Haytham the surprise protagonist of the first third of the game as an effective idea to draw players into the narrative. It also offered a fresh perspective on the conflict between Assassins and Templars, as Haytham is the first playable Templar in the series. However, he noted that his character arc was far too long because there was no time for extensive product testing, which led to some backlash from players. According to series writer Susan Patrick, in Assassin's Creed Rogue, the emphasis of Haytham's role was placed on him being a role model for Assassin-turned-Templar Shay Patrick Cormac, because they both had similar backgrounds, while one of the main objectives of the game was to show the missing chapters in Haytham's life. Adrian Hough, the actor who performed Haytham's voice and motion capture, noted that the writing was very good for the character, and acknowledged that the development team gave him artistic freedom to make the character his own, ultimately considering him a product of his performance as well as of the writing and animation.

=== Mohawk collaboration ===
In the interest of accuracy, Ubisoft consulted Teiowí:sonte Thomas Deer on the game's depiction of Mohawk culture. Deer, from the Kanien’kehá:ka Onkwawén:na Raotitióhkwa Language and Cultural Center, advised on developmental decisions regarding the portrayal of cultural details such as clothes, music, etc. Scalping, originally intended as a game mechanic, was removed after Deer informed the developers out that the Mohawk people depicted in the game never actually performed scalping. Deer, along with Mohawk language teacher Akwiratékha Martin, helped Noah Watts learn Kanien'kéha, the Mohawk language, for voicing Ratonhnhaké:ton. Martin reported that Ubisoft gave him liberty to change dialogue that he did not feel sounded very "Kanien'kéha" or that he found inappropriate. Residents of the nearby Kahnawà:ke Mohawk community in Montreal also contributed their voices and music to the game.

In Mohawk culture, each individual's name is unique and sacred and never to be given to someone else. It was a considered a significant honor when the Mohawk community allowed Ubisoft the Kahnawà:ke name Ratonhnhaké:ton for Connor. Because of this, Ubisoft has not trademarked Connor's Mohawk name out of respect and gratitude. Originally, there was a cutscene that showed Ratonhnhaké:ton's village wearing ceremonial masks, but because the masks were part of a very private aspect of Mohawk spirituality, Deer requested that they be omitted. Deer's contributions to the project were substantial, and he noted that the game's finished product was a "phenomenal achievement" for his people.

=== Technical issues ===
On November 14, 2012, Ubisoft reassured that the PC version of Assassin's Creed III will launch with fewer bugs than the PlayStation 3 and Xbox 360 versions. A patch was in the works to fix glitches on all versions. It was the second title update for the game following a large patch available day-one. The PC launch came with both of these patches included. After two days, Ubisoft detailed the sizable patch scheduled for release across the major platforms. This extensive patch was designed to address a list of around one hundred identified bugs present within the single-player campaign and online multiplayer modes plaguing the player experience. Some of the problems outlined involve substantial environmental instability, severe NPC technical issues, occasional console crashes and various issues involving sound synchronization amongst others.

Ubisoft recommends the PC version of the game to be played with a controller even though it will still support a keyboard and mouse setup. Ubisoft Montreal's creative director Alex Hutchinson admitted: "We're definitely supporting PC, we love PC, but I think it'll be PC with a controller. I don't see us investing hugely in a mouse and keyboard setup. I think if you want to play on PC and you want to play Assassin's Creed, you have a controller."

=== Music ===
The score to Assassin's Creed III was composed by Scottish composer Lorne Balfe, who previously co-composed the soundtrack of Assassin's Creed: Revelations with longtime Assassin's Creed series composer Jesper Kyd. The game's soundtrack is the first soundtrack of the series' main games to not feature Kyd. The soundtrack was released via digital download on October 30, 2012.

== Marketing ==
Ubisoft Australia put together a "very special, very limited" edition of Assassin's Creed III to auction off in benefit of the Sydney Children's Hospital Foundation. There are only ten of these editions in the world, and eight of them were auctioned off to raise money for the Sydney Children's Hospital in Randwick.

Ubisoft's senior vice president of sales and marketing, Tony Key, said the game would enjoy the biggest marketing commitment in company history. Ubisoft UK MD Rob Cooper has said that Assassin's Creed III is a good entry point for newcomers to the series and that he thinks Assassin's Creed III will hold its own against this year's biggest releases. In March 2012, the Assassin's Creed: Double Pack was released both as a retail purchase for PlayStation 3, Xbox 360 and for download on PlayStation Network, which brings together the first Assassin's Creed and Assassin's Creed II in a virtual compilation box.

Ubisoft has collaborated with several retail outlets on pre-order bonuses available through several store chains throughout the world. Which of the pre-order bonuses the player received depended upon where they pre-ordered the game. A free SteelBook collectible featuring artwork by comic book artist Alex Ross was available as a pre-order incentive. The "Captain of the Aquila" DLC pack includes a single player weapon (the Pirate Boarding Axe) and a single player skin (the Captain of the Aquila's uniform). The "Colonial Assassin" DLC pack includes a single player weapon (the Scottish Flintlock) and a single player skin (the Traditional Colonial Assassins outfit). "Redcoat Multiplayer" DLC pack includes redcoat costume, a snake emblem, and a "doctor doll" relic. In the US, GameStop offered the single-player mission Lost Mayan Ruins and the Sawtooth Sword, Best Buy offered the single-player mission Ghost of War and the Pontiac's War Club, while Amazon offered the Steelbook case.

SCEE offers a digital version of Assassin's Creed III via the PlayStation Store. Dubbed the "Gold Edition", the download includes the game, PlayStation Vita title Assassin's Creed III: Liberation and a Season Pass (a first for the series). Another version of the "Gold Edition" features the game and the Season Pass, but not Liberation. The third version comes with Liberation, but without the Season Pass. All versions include A Dangerous Secret, the extra mission available with the Special Edition.

Dutch site Entertainment Business reported that thieves made off with a truck on November 14, 2012, in transporting the entire launch shipment of Assassin's Creed III on PC for Belgium, the Netherlands and Luxembourg. Ubisoft stated that it would not affect the launch as copies will be sourced elsewhere. Those who pre-ordered the Join or Die edition, however, were affected as allegedly this cannot be re-manufactured. Ubisoft passed on serial numbers and barcodes to retailers of the stolen games and placed the same numbers on a blacklist preventing them from receiving online authentication.

American global technology company Nvidia bundled the PC version of Assassin's Creed III with its new GeForce GTX 650 Ti. It is built on the Kepler architecture along with others in Nvidia's 600 series of GPUs. According to Nvidia, Assassin's Creed III makes the most of the TXAA technology. Ubisoft Australia put together a "very special, very limited" edition of Assassin's Creed III to auction off in benefit of the Sydney Children's Hospital Foundation. There are only ten of these editions in the world, and eight of them will be auctioned off to raise money for the Sydney Children's Hospital in Randwick. Each was auctioned separately between November 30, 2012, and December 17.

=== Retail editions ===
On March 26, 2012, Ubisoft announced three collectors' editions of Assassin's Creed III, The Freedom, Join Or Die and Special editions, exclusive to Europe, the Middle East and African countries, and Australia. On June 1, 2012, Ubisoft also announced another collectors' edition of Assassin's Creed III, the UbiWorkshop Edition. Ubisoft and Sony partnered to offer the game as a bundle with the PlayStation 3 console, which was offered from the day of the game's release. On the day of its release, Assassin's Creed III on the PlayStation 3 received four exclusive single-player missions, titled The Benedict Arnold Missions. The gameplay revolves around Benedict Arnold and his connections with turning West Point over to the British. Scriptwriter Matt Turner stated that the Benedict Arnold missions were some of the most historically accurate missions in the game, as "some scenes have the actual words spoken by key players in the events at West Point, according to the records from the court proceedings following what happened."

- The Freedom Edition features a retail copy of the game, a steel book case with cover art drawn by comic artist Alex Ross, George Washington's notebook, a 24 cm figurine of the protagonist Connor and two exclusive lithographs. In-game content included is two exclusive single player missions (Ghost of War and Lost Mayan Ruins) and an additional multiplayer character (Sharpshooter).
- The Join Or Die Edition features a retail copy of the game, Connor's medallion (the medallion of the Assassins with its curd ladle) and George Washington's notebook. In-game content included is one exclusive single player mission (Ghost of War) and an additional multiplayer character (Sharpshooter).
- The Special Edition features a retail copy of the game and special packaging. In-game content included is one exclusive single-player mission (A Dangerous Secret).
- The UbiWorkshop Edition features a retail copy of the game, the second edition of the Assassin's Creed Encyclopedia, exclusive packaging, five rare prints, and a new graphic novel titled Assassin's Creed: Subject 4.
- The Limited Edition features a retail copy of the game, a 24 cm figurine of Connor, an embroidered 28" x 48" Assassin's Creed-inspired Colonial flag, a 3" x 3.25" metal belt buckle with the Assassin insignia and George Washington's notebook. In-game content included is an exclusive single player mission (Lost Mayan Ruins). This edition is not available in the UK or Europe due to perceived anti-British sentiment portrayed in the content.
- The Digital Deluxe Edition features a retail copy of the game, George Washington's notebook and the official Assassin's Creed III soundtrack. In-game content included is three exclusive single-player missions, two skins (The Captain of the Aquila's uniform and The Colonial Assassin outfit) and two additional multiplayer characters (Sharpshooter and Redcoat). It also includes the Benedict Arnold DLC previously exclusive only to the PS3. The edition is exclusive to PC.
- Washington Edition includes: all 3 parts of DLC "The Tyranny of King Washington", "The Hidden Secrets Pack" and "The Battle Hardened Pack". It was released June 20, 2013.

=== Remastered ===
In September 2018, a remastered edition of Assassin's Creed III was announced. The remaster contains enhanced visuals, lighting, and resolution, improved character models, and several modified game mechanics, with all previously released downloadable content also included. The remastered version also includes support for UHD resolution on the PS4 Pro and Xbox One X. It was released on March 29, 2019, for Microsoft Windows, PlayStation 4, and Xbox One, both as a downloadable add-on to Assassin's Creed Odyssey and a standalone game. A Nintendo Switch version was released on May 21, 2019.

In February 2025 Assassin's Creed III Remastered received official achievements support on Steam.

== Downloadable content ==
On October 3, 2012, Ubisoft revealed a Season Pass for downloadable content (DLC), made available for a six-month time period on PlayStation Network and on Xbox Live. The pass gives purchasers access to the three Tyranny of King Washington DLC packs, The Hidden Secrets pack with all the preorder, retailer exclusive, bonus material, and The Battle Hardened pack, featuring new maps and characters for multiplayer. Furthermore, players with the pass received access to DLC a week before other gamers.

The Remastered version of Assassin's Creed III includes all previously released DLC, minus any multiplayer content, as that feature has been removed. This version also comes with exclusive legacy outfits based on the protagonists from later games in the series, namely Edward Kenway from Assassin's Creed IV: Black Flag, Shay Patrick Cormac from Assassin's Creed Rogue, Arno Dorian from Assassin's Creed Unity, Jacob Frye from Assassin's Creed Syndicate, Bayek from Assassin's Creed Origins, and Alexios from Assassin's Creed Odyssey; Aguilar de Nerha's outfit from the live-action Assassin's Creed film is also included.

=== Uplay content ===
Ubisoft's Uplay system enables further in-game enhancements which can be redeemed by points that are given when playing the game. The available awards are an "Assassin's Creed III Theme" (available for the PlayStation 3, Xbox 360 and PC); "The Life Scratcher Pack", which allows the player to increase the capacity of Connor's tool pouches, and unlock exclusive multiplayer profile items; "Ezio's Outfit'", an outfit similar to the one worn by Ezio Auditore in Assassin's Creed: Brotherhood, but with a differently colored cape; and "The Renegade Pack", which unlocks the Multiplayer Night Stalker's costume and additional profile items.

=== The Hidden Secrets Pack ===
On December 4, 2012, The Hidden Secrets Pack was released for Season Pass players on the PlayStation 3, Xbox 360 and PC, with all gamers getting the pack on December 11, 2012, and Wii U players getting the pack on January 17, 2013. The pack includes three missions (The Lost Mayan Ruins, The Ghost of War and A Dangerous Secret), which unlock the Sawtooth Cutlass, Pontiac War Club, and Flintlock Musket respectively, two single-player costumes (the Captain of the Aquila and the Colonial Assassin), and two multiplayer characters (the Redcoat and the Sharpshooter). All of the content was previously available as preorder bonuses through different retailers, or in different editions of the game.

=== The Battle Hardened Pack ===
Announced on December 4, 2012, with The Hidden Secrets Pack, The Battle Hardened Pack includes new maps and characters for multiplayer. On January 8, 2013, The Battle Hardened Pack was released to all players on the PlayStation 3 and Xbox 360, with a PC release on January 15 and Wii U release on January 17. The pack includes the Governor, Highlander and Coyote Man multiplayer characters and the Charlestown, Fort St-Mathieu and Saint Pierre maps.

=== The Tyranny of King Washington ===
On October 3, 2012, Ubisoft revealed the first major story-driven DLC for the game, titled The Tyranny of King Washington. The story revolves around an alternative history "The United Kingdom of America", wherein George Washington has seized an Apple of Eden, becomes corrupted by its power, and dubs himself King. The player, Connor, is tasked with overthrowing the dictator. The single-player campaign is separated into three episodic installments: The Infamy, released on February 19, 2013; The Betrayal, released on March 19; and The Redemption, released on April 23.

== Reception ==
=== Critical response ===
Reception

Aggregate score
Aggregator	Score
Metacritic	PS3: 85/100; X360: 84/100; WIIU: 85/100; PC: 80/100

Review scores
Publication	Score
1Up.com	B−
Edge	8/10
Eurogamer	9/10
G4	5/5
Game Informer	9.5/10
GameSpot	8.5/10
GamesRadar+	4/5
GameTrailers	9.2/10
IGN	8.5/10
Joystiq	3.5/5
PlayStation Official Magazine – UK	7/10
Official Xbox Magazine (US)	8.5/10

Assassin's Creed III received positive reviews, with critics praising the narrative, gameplay (particularly the naval missions), setting, and scale, while complaints focused on the unevenly developed mechanics, prescriptive mission design, and pacing. Aggregating review website Metacritic gave the PlayStation 3 version 85/100, the Xbox 360 version 84/100, the Wii U version 85/100, and the PC version 80/100.

Daniel Bischoff of GameRevolution gave it 5/5 stars, saying "Combining the best of the franchise so far, Assassin's Creed III doesn't disappoint long-time fans who've been with the series while also making it easy enough to jump in for the kill."

IGN gave the game a score of 8.5/10, saying "It achieves so much that you can't help but respect it, no other open world game has ever given us a setting that's as impressive to observe or as full of things to do as this". They did, however, say "Not everything about the game gels together convincingly and the missions' unnecessary prescriptiveness sometimes undermines the sense of freedom that the rest of the game works so hard to create". GameSpot gave a similar review, stating "It takes chances with its opening, with its story, and with its characters. It expands the series' gameplay in enjoyable and sensible ways. As with many ambitious games, not every arrow fired hits the bull's eye, yet this big, narratively rich sequel is easy to get invested in" and gave a score of 8.5/10. Game Informer awarded the game 9.5/10, saying "Assassin's Creed III delivers everything the series has promised, and throws in a little more for good measure ... Most players will likely spend the first six hours of Assassin's Creed III wrapping their heads around the profound size and ambition of the game".

G4 felt that "Assassins Creed III [was] not perfect ... But there is so much story, so much multiplayer, and so much stuff to do that your average 10 hour game should be terribly ashamed of itself". Official Xbox Magazine gave it 8.5/10, and said "[Its] newly refined gameplay and incredibly rich setting are captivating stuff ... It improves on the underlying Assassin's Creed formula in a handful of subtle but tangible ways ... And its unwavering commitment to storytelling is both rare and impressive". They did however criticize, "Pacing problems which can drag the campaign into busy-work tedium". PC Gamer was more critical, giving the game a 72/100 and stating that Assassin's Creed III had "Entertaining storytelling and fantastic naval combat marred by terrible mission design and endemic feature creep." The reviewer felt that homesteading detracted from the central theme and story, and narrowly scripted optional objectives punished players for thinking laterally. "It's about pattern recognition rather than creative thought, binary reactions with no room for life or dynamism." Jose Otero of 1Up.com gave the game a decent score but felt the gameplay cycle was getting stale, he stated: "AC (Assassin's Creed) can only sail on its past success for so long before it sinks into a sea of formulaic design."

Connor had a mixed reception as the game's lead character. Critics often drew unfavorable comparisons to his father Haytham, as well as the previous protagonists in the series. In his review of Assassin's Creed III for PSM3, Joel Gregory was disappointed by Connor's character arc, saying that although his skills develop over the course of the main storyline, his personality does not. He also called Connor "relentlessly strait-laced and humourless", and "duller than Altair and a world away from Ezio." German outlet GamePro criticized his lack of development and blind devotion to the Assassin Order, but acknowledging that he is a more nuanced character than most people give him credit for and that their opinion about the character may change if a direct sequel to Assassin's Creed III further develops his personality.

Haytham was well-received as a character and often contrasted with the divisiveness of his son, Connor. In a contemporary review of Assassin's Creed III for PC Gamer, Chris Thursten called Haytham a good villain but also observed that "the writers seem to like [Haytham] more than they do their ostensible lead [Connor]." However, a lot of contemporary reviewers refused to give a detailed account on Haytham, in order to not spoil the plot twist that he, a Templar, is the game's first protagonist. Alex Hutchinson, the game's creative director, noted that the character faced some backlash as a surprise protagonist due to his arc being too long, but pointed out that he remains a fan favorite, making his way into other installments and selling a lot of action figures, whereas GamesRadar+ lauded this move as "bold" in a list of gaming's most satisfying character switches. Adrian Hough, the voice actor who portrayed Haytham, was nominated for a BAFTA Games Award in the "Performer" category at the 9th British Academy Games Awards ceremony for his portrayal. In an interview, the actor noted the positive fan response his character had received, especially in regards to cosplay.

==== Remastered ====
Assassin's Creed III Remastered

Aggregate score
Aggregator	Score
Metacritic	PC: 75/100; PS4: 72/100; XONE: 76/100; NS: 60/100

According to Metacritic, Assassin's Creed III Remastered received "generally favorable reviews" on PC as well as Xbox One, whereas the PlayStation 4 and Nintendo Switch versions were met with "mixed or average" reviews.

=== Native depiction ===
Depictions of Native Americans in Assassin’s Creed III were met with mixed receptions from the community. Being Native, Connor is subject to the stereotypes associated with Native Americans, like the noble savage, and given that Assassin's Creed games are violent in nature, there was a mixed response to the depiction of a brutal Native American main character. Connor's weapon is his tomahawk which he is shown with in every cutscene and which he uses with extreme lethality; this was controversial because the tomahawk being Connor's signature weapon can be interpreted as a depiction of Native Americans being primitive while simultaneously showing the white dominance since they are always seen with more developed weaponry. The game has also been criticized for forcing pity upon Connor as a character because of the focus on his origins and experience of his village and people being burned down, but having him only save and assist white characters.

=== Accolades ===
Assassin's Creed III was nominated for six awards in the 2012 Spike Video Game Awards: Game of the Year, Best Xbox 360 Game, Best PS3 Game, Best Action Adventure Game, Best Graphics, and Character of the Year (Connor). GameTrailers awarded Assassin's Creed 3 Best Action-Adventure Game of the Year 2012 while Game Revolution named Assassin's Creed III its Game of the Year 2012. During the 16th Annual D.I.C.E. Awards, the Academy of Interactive Arts & Sciences awarded Assassin's Creed III with "Outstanding Achievement in Animation", along with receiving nominations for "Adventure Game of the Year" and "Outstanding Achievement in Sound Design". Assassin's Creed III also received four Game Developers Choice Awards nominations for Best Audio, Best Narrative, Best Technology, and Game of the Year.

List of accolades received by Assassin's Creed III
Year	Award	Category	Recipient(s) and nominees(s)	Result	Ref.
2012	2012 Spike Video Game Awards	Game of the Year	Assassin's Creed III	Nominated	
2012	2012 Spike Video Game Awards	Best Xbox 360 Game	Assassin's Creed III	Nominated	
2012	2012 Spike Video Game Awards	Best PS3 Game	Assassin's Creed III	Nominated	
2012	2012 Spike Video Game Awards	Best Action Adventure Game	Assassin's Creed III	Nominated	
2012	2012 Spike Video Game Awards	Best Graphics	Assassin's Creed III	Nominated	
2012	2012 Spike Video Game Awards	Character of the Year	Connor	Nominated	
2012	4th Annual Inside Gaming Awards	Best Environmental Design	Assassin's Creed III	Nominated	
2012	4th Annual Inside Gaming Awards	Best Character Design	Connor	Nominated	
2012	4th Annual Inside Gaming Awards	Gamers' Choice	Assassin's Creed III	Won	
2013	16th Annual D.I.C.E. Awards	Adventure Game of the Year	Assassin's Creed III	Nominated	
2013	16th Annual D.I.C.E. Awards	Outstanding Achievement in Animation	Assassin's Creed III	Won	
2013	16th Annual D.I.C.E. Awards	Outstanding Achievement in Sound Design	Assassin's Creed III	Nominated	
2013	2013 Writers Guild of America Award	Outstanding Achievement in Videogame Writing	Alex Hutchinson, Corey May, Matt Turner (story); Richard Farrese, Jeffrey Yohalem (multiplayer story); Corey May (lead scriptwriter); Nicholas Grimwood, Russell Lees, Matt Turner, Danny Wallace, Ceri Young (scriptwriters)	Nominated	
2013	9th British Academy Video Games Awards	Audio Achievement	Assassin's Creed III	Nominated	
2013	9th British Academy Video Games Awards	Online – Multiplayer	Assassin's Creed III	Nominated	
2013	9th British Academy Video Games Awards	Original Music	Assassin's Creed III	Nominated	
2013	9th British Academy Video Games Awards	Performer	Adrian Hough (Haytham Kenway)	Nominated	
2013	13th Annual Game Developers Choice Awards	Best Audio	Assassin's Creed III	Nominated	
2013	13th Annual Game Developers Choice Awards	Best Technology	Assassin's Creed III	Nominated	

=== Sales ===
On March 30, 2012, Ubisoft stated that in the three weeks since the game's pre-order campaign began, numbers had already surpassed the total U.S. pre-order numbers of Assassin's Creed: Brotherhood and exceeded 10 times more than the pre-orders Assassin's Creed: Revelations attracted in a comparable time frame. On October 25, 2012, Ubisoft announced that the game is the most pre-ordered game in the company's history, more than doubling pre-orders for Revelations, the previous record holder.

Assassin's Creed III was the bestselling game in the United Kingdom in the week of its release, with the best sales of the series to date. It was the biggest launch in publisher Ubisoft's history and the third biggest launch of any game in the UK in 2012 (behind Call of Duty: Black Ops II and FIFA 13). It doubled the launch week sales of Assassin's Creed II, and beat 2011's Revelations by over 117,000 copies. According to Ubisoft, Assassin's Creed III sold over 3.5 million units in its first week, which represents a 100 percent year-over-year increase from Revelations. On December 12, 2012, Ubisoft announced that the game had sold 7 million copies worldwide. In the United Kingdom, Assassin's Creed III was the 3rd bestselling title of 2012, after being on sale for 2 months. According to the NPD Group, the game was the 4th bestselling game of 2012 in North America. On February 7, 2013, Ubisoft announced that the game had sold 12 million copies worldwide, representing an almost 70 percent increase over Revelations at the same point of its lifecycle, and making it the best-selling game in the franchise.

=== Controversy ===
In June 2012, Ubisoft and in particular its French-Canadian subsidiary Ubisoft Montreal had to fend off increasing accusations of anti-British prejudice after trailers and box art depicting the killing of British Redcoats started to appear. One site described the 'July 4' live-action trailer as "American nationalism". Lead script writer Corey May defended the developers and publisher Ubisoft from allegations of bigotry and discrimination. This controversy, however, continued because marketing materials continued to depict only the British as the enemy, with a number of gaming news outlets noting US trailers cutting scenes that did seem to depict the protagonist killing Patriots. The publisher eventually decided that the Limited Edition of the game would not be sold in the UK or Europe.

Upon the game's release, critics said their depiction was balanced and fair. Official Xbox Magazine UK felt that "the strongest aspect of ACIII is the more mature moral tone – there's none of the anticipated 'yay, America'." In another review by Kotaku, the reviewer notes "publishers from big video game companies are not known for subtlety or complexity of theme", going on to say "the marketing always suggested that Assassin's Creed III's igniting of the Revolution would be a game of interactive jingoism; its developers always said it was not. The developers were the ones being accurate."

== Series continuation ==
Assassin's Creed is all about cycles – we have the Ezio cycle and the Altair cycle, and both of those are set to conclude in Revelations and we have the Desmond cycle, which is set to end on December 2012. But there are many cycles within the brand – that's the whole point. History is our playground.

— Alexandre Amancio, game director of Assassin's Creed: Revelations, in October 2011

In September 2012, franchise main writer Corey May stated that the Assassin's Creed III plot leaves possible sequels "plenty of room to play". Assassin's Creed III associate producer Julien Laferrière said that further Assassin's Creed games featuring new hero Connor depend on reaction to character, stating "We made three games with Ezio because people loved Ezio." In November 2012, The Gaming Liberty spotted a supposed Ubisoft survey that suggested another annual installment could be set for release next year. The survey asked participants how they would feel about a return of Desmond, Connor and the American Revolution setting, and if they would purchase such a title if it were to be released next year, suggesting that Ubisoft had its eye on repeating the Brotherhood and Revelations route of the Ezio trilogy. The survey was also said to ask how participants would feel about the introduction of a co-op mode, and how they feel about Naughty Dog's Uncharted 3: Drake's Deception, possibly suggesting a move to more scripted gameplay.

On February 28, 2013, Ubisoft posted their first promotional picture and cover for their next Assassin's Creed game, following leaked marketing material days before. Titled Assassin's Creed IV: Black Flag, it serves as a sequel to Assassin's Creed III's modern story and a prequel to its ancestral storyline. The game is set in the Caribbean islands during the Golden Age of Piracy, and centers around Edward Kenway; the father of Haytham Kenway, and grandfather of Connor, the two playable characters of Assassin's Creed III.
