= Victoria Atkin =

English actress

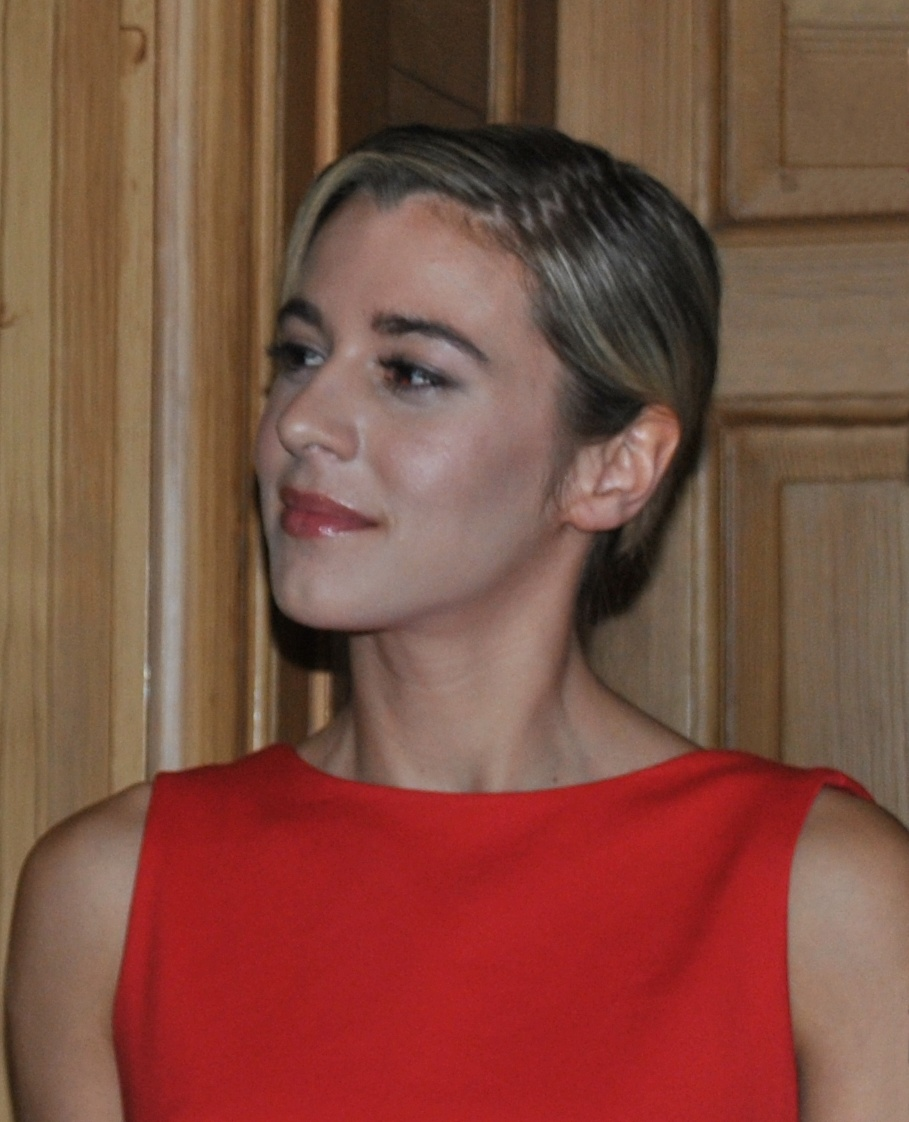
- Atkin in 2011
- Occupation: Actress
- Years active: 2010–present
- Website: VictoriaAtkin.com

Victoria Atkin is a British actress who has played roles in Extinct, Assassin's Creed: Syndicate, and Hollyoaks, the last of which she has won several awards for in her portrayal of Jason Costello.

== Early years and education ==
Atkin attended Fernhill School and Language College, and Farnborough Sixth Form College, studied Dance and Theatre Performance at The University of Chichester in 2008, and took a postgraduate course in Musical Theatre at the Royal Central School of Speech and Drama in 2009.

== Career ==
Originally training as a slalom skier, Atkin landed her first major television appearance and series regular role, shortly after graduating from The Royal Central School of Speech and Drama in Swiss Cottage in London.

She was cast as the first fictional transgender teenager on British television, completing 134 episodes in the role in the series Hollyoaks and Hollyoaks Later. Atkin's portrayal of her character Jasmine/Jason Costello, increased awareness for transgender people in the media. Atkin visited Downing Street and met with Prime Minister David Cameron as well as working with Channel 4 executives and Hollyoaks costar Kieron Richardson to sign a memorandum of understanding to accurately portray transgender people in the media. Atkin was nominated and won various awards for Best Actress in this role.

From this, she has gone on to play a host of characters in multiple television shows in the UK and USA including the female lead, Feena in original sci-fi television series Extinct. In addition to her work theatrically Atkin is frequently cast in performance capture and voiceover projects, including playable lead Evie Frye in the Assassin's Creed video game franchise. She is the host and producer of iTunes podcast The Performance Capture Podcast.

== Filmography ==
Film roles
Year	Title	Role	Notes
2017	A Good Dream	Beatrice	
2017	Altitude	Speedbird PA	Voice role

Television roles
Year	Title	Role	Notes
2010–2011	Hollyoaks	Jason/Jasmine Costello	Main role
2010	Hollyoaks Later	Jason/Jasmine Costello	Main role
2012	Holby City	Lainey Craig	Episode: "Long Way Down"
2013	The Girl's Guide to Depravity	Camilla Jones	Guest role
2016	#killerpost	Jenelle Potter	Episode: "Payne/Potter"
2017	Extinct	Feena	Series Lead

Video game roles
Year	Title	Role	Notes
2015	Assassin's Creed: Syndicate	Evie Frye	Full performance capture
2017	Horizon Zero Dawn	Sekuli & Mailen	The Frozen Wilds expansion
2017	Middle-earth: Shadow of War	Humans	
2018	World of Warcraft: Battle for Azeroth	Void Elf	
2018	Fortnite	Thora, Clip, Powerchord	
2019	Crackdown 3	Agent Zaya	
2019	Crash Team Racing Nitro-Fueled	Liz	
2019	Smite	First Mate Serqet	
2020	Guardian Tales	Beth	
2022	Tactics Ogre: Reborn	Catiua Pavel	

== Awards and nominations ==
In 2011, Atkin was awarded "Best Serial Drama Performance" and "Best Newcomer" by the Transgender Television Awards, for her portrayal of Jason Costello in Hollyoaks and, the same year, Hollyoaks was awarded "Best Serial Drama" for the Jason Costello storyline.

Year	Award	Category	Work	Result
2011	TV Choice Awards	Best Soap Actress	Jason Costello on Hollyoaks	Nominated
