= Immortals Fenyx Rising =

2020 video game

- Developer: Ubisoft Quebec (Note: Ubisoft Chengdu developed the Myths of the Eastern Realm DLC.)
- Publisher: Ubisoft
- Director: Scott Phillips
- Writer: Jeffrey Yohalem
- Composer: Gareth Coker
- Engine: Ubisoft Anvil
- Platforms: Nintendo Switch; PlayStation 4; PlayStation 5; Stadia; Windows; Xbox One; Xbox Series X/S
- Release: 3 December 2020
- Genre: Action-adventure
- Mode: Single-player

Immortals Fenyx Rising is a 2020 action-adventure video game developed by Ubisoft Quebec and published by Ubisoft. It was released for Nintendo Switch, PlayStation 4, PlayStation 5, Stadia, Windows, Xbox One, and Xbox Series X/S. Immortals Fenyx Rising tells the story, as narrated by Prometheus to Zeus, of Fenyx, a mortal who in order to rescue Fenyx's brother must stop the evil Typhon after his escape from the underworld.

The game originated from a software bug the team discovered during the development of Assassin's Creed Odyssey, which changed the humans on the player's crew into giant cyclopses. The team wanted to create a game that embraces the mythological aspect of Greece. It was originally revealed as Gods & Monsters, though the name was changed following a trademark dispute with Monster Energy. The game received positive reviews from critics, and Ubisoft released three downloadable content packs for the game following its launch.

== Gameplay ==
As Fenyx, the player can explore the seven regions in the game freely from a third-person perspective.

Immortals is an action-adventure game played from a third-person perspective. The player can customize the gender, voice, and the appearance of Fenyx, though she is canonically female. After unlocking the Hall of Gods, the player can use Aphrodite's Beauty Chair to make further changes at any point in the game. The game is set on the Golden Isle, a large open world consisting of seven distinct regions inspired by Greek mythology. The player is accompanied by Phosphor, a bird who can identify locations of interest on the map. Fenyx can traverse the world quickly through climbing cliffs, riding on a mount, and flying using the wings of Daedalus. The full open world is accessible from the start of the game. As players explore the world, they encounter rifts which teleport them to the Vaults of Tartaros, which are a series of platforming challenges that require players to utilize both Fenyx's combat and traversal abilities. Players can complete various side-objectives and optional puzzles.

The world of the Golden Isle is occupied with various enemies inspired by Greek mythology, including minotaurs to cyclopes. There are two modes of melee attack: fast and weak light attacks with a sword and slow and strong heavy attacks with an axe. Fenyx can use bow and arrows to defeat enemies. Players need to manage Fenyx's stamina during combat as they will become exhausted after repeated attacks. As players progress in the game, they can unlock powerful godlike abilities. For instance, Fenyx can unlock Ares' Wrath, a group of spears that thrust enemies into the air. Armor and weapons can be upgraded by collecting sufficient crafting resources.

== Plot ==
After eons imprisoned under a mountain by Zeus, Typhon escapes, seeking to break the barrier between the mortal realm and Tartaros and remake the world in his own image. He attacks the Olympian gods, severing them from their godly essences and robbing them of their powers. Zeus flees and meets with Prometheus, seeking to secure his aid in battling Typhon. Prometheus instead makes a wager with Zeus: if Typhon can be beaten by a mortal, then he will be freed from his imprisonment. Prometheus uses his power of foresight to tell the story of Fenyx.

Fenyx, a young Greek shield-bearer of the Delian League, survives a shipwreck and washes up on the Golden Isle, where they are shocked to find that the surviving crew and the Golden Isle's residents have been turned to stone. After recovering several artifacts belonging to legendary Greek heroes and receiving a prophecy, Fenyx rescues a young stranger, who helps them reach the Hall of the Gods. There, the stranger reveals himself as Hermes, and informs them of the grave threat Typhon poses. Determined to save humanity, Fenyx agrees to venture out into the Golden Isle to restore the deposed Olympian gods, along the way befriending a 'fire bird' which they name Phosphor. Fenyx manages to restore Aphrodite, who became a tree without her passion; Ares, who was transformed into a rooster without his pride; Hephaestus, who became one of his automatons without suffering; and Athena, who was turned into a child without the ability to make clear judgments. Fenyx also defeats the spirits of Achilles, Atalanta, Heracles, and Odysseus, who were all corrupted by Typhon.

Despite their restoration, the gods are unable to agree on a plan to stop Typhon and subsequently revert to their usual bickering and infighting. Fenyx's older brother Ligyron, who escaped the petrification curse, arrives and tells the gods of his plan to steal Hephaestus' chains from Typhon, enchant them using the blood of the gods, and use them to re-imprison Typhon. The gods agree to Ligyron's plan, but Fenyx is frustrated at his refusal to bring them along. The gods, who dislike Ligyron as he reminds them of Zeus, encourage Fenyx to pursue their brother so as not to let him steal their deserved glory.

Fenyx scales the mountain at the center of the Golden Isle; at the top, they discover that Ligyron is allied with Typhon, and has collected all the ingredients necessary to create a poison capable of killing the gods. In return, Typhon will allow Ligyron to become a god in his new world and rule the Golden Isle. Fenyx defeats Ligyron in battle, forcing him to flee to Tartaros. Fenyx follows their brother and confronts Typhon, eventually besting him in battle. With his last breath, Typhon reveals that Fenyx is a demigod and Hermes' child.

Throughout the story, Zeus comes to realize how badly he has mistreated his children, the other gods, and his past lovers, and becomes guilt-ridden over his selfishness and vanity. However, he interrupts when he hears Fenyx is Hermes' child, as this should not be possible; Prometheus then admits that he had manipulated and fabricated parts of the story. He reveals that he arranged for his Titan brother Atlas to free Typhon and shipwreck Fenyx on the Golden Isle. In addition, he hid details of Fenyx's true parentage: they are actually a child of Zeus and his lover Thetis. He also tells Zeus that Typhon informed him of Zeus being behind the curse that turned humanity to stone. At that moment, Fenyx arrives with Typhon's poison, confirming the entire story was part of Prometheus' plot to have Zeus killed as revenge for imprisoning him.

Zeus admits that he wanted to destroy humanity due to their flaws, but now sees that these flaws merely reflect those of himself and the other gods, and accepts his impending death. However, Fenyx reveals they have no intention of killing Zeus, wanting instead to inspire him to be a better god and father. Typhon reappears, furious that Fenyx did not kill Zeus as planned. Consuming the poison to empower himself, he captures Zeus and taunts Fenyx to try and stop him. Fenyx follows Typhon back to Tartaros and battles him again, but they begin to lose ground after Phosphor is killed. However, Zeus manages to escape and rallies the other gods to Fenyx's aid. Working together, they are able to subdue Typhon, who is defeated for good after succumbing to the poison.

Afterward, as a reward for helping defeat Typhon, Zeus agrees to return humanity to normal, restores Phosphor as a new creature, the first phoenix, and invites Fenyx to live on the Golden Isle with the gods. Fenyx agrees, as long as they get to keep an eye on Zeus to ensure he is committed to changing his ways. Meanwhile, Zeus sends Ligyron to free Prometheus as part of the wager, but not before tormenting Prometheus by having Ligyron tell his own story of Fenyx, much to Prometheus' annoyance.

== Development ==
Immortals Fenyx Rising was developed by Ubisoft Quebec, the team which created Assassin's Creed Odyssey. Game director Scott Phillips added that the project originated from a software bug the team discovered during the development of Odyssey, which changed the humans on the player's crew into giant cyclopses, and decided that it would be a good idea to create a separate game that embraces the mythological side of Greece. Due to the positive reception of Odyssey, Ubisoft's management agreed to greenlight the project.

The game was announced as Gods and Monsters during E3 2019. Initially set to be released on February 26, 2020, the game was delayed in October 2019 after another Ubisoft tentpole release, Tom Clancy's Ghost Recon Breakpoint, failed to be commercially successful. According to Ubisoft, the delay gave additional time for the development team to "ensure that their respective innovations are perfectly implemented so as to deliver optimal experiences for players." Quebec studio used the additional time to add Zeus and Prometheus as the game's duo narrators, replacing Greek poet Homer, who was initially intended to fulfill this role. A work-in-progress build of the game was leaked on Stadia under the codename Orpheus in June 2020. It was re-revealed as Immortals Fenyx Rising on September 10, 2020. The studio decided to rename the game to reflect its narrative focus and put more emphasis on Fenyx, the game's protagonist. The change appeared to be a result from a trademark dispute with Monster Energy, which challenged the Gods and Monsters name, believing it would cause confusion.

Jeffrey Yohalem, who wrote for previous Ubisoft titles such as Assassin's Creed II, Far Cry 3, and Child of Light, served as narrative director and lead writer. The humour—particularly that involving the bickering between the narrators Zeus and Prometheus—was inspired by films such as Robin Hood: Men in Tights, The Princess Bride, and The Naked Gun. In regards to adapting Greek mythology for modern audiences, Yohalem explained that he did not want to avoid the darker aspects of its gods and heroes (providing the example of Paris' kidnapping of Helen of Troy), and instead wanted to specifically highlight those elements through a modern perspective, as it "[speaks] to our current political climate and who we are as human beings on social media." Yohalem believed that the capability of Greek gods and heroes to commit evil acts made them more human, saying that "[the] Greeks believed in balance where what makes us human and makes us complete are both our strengths and weaknesses."

Gareth Coker, who previously worked on Ori and the Blind Forest and its sequel Ori and the Will of the Wisps, composed the score. Ancient Greek instruments such as lyre and kithara were used when he was recording the music. Coker commissioned these instruments from a Greek luthier and had them transported across the Atlantic.

The game was released on December 3, 2020 for Nintendo Switch, PlayStation 4, PlayStation 5, Stadia, Windows, Xbox One, and Xbox Series X/S. A free demo for the game was released for Stadia users before the game's official launch. A version for Amazon Luna was made available the following day. The first of three DLC packs for the game, A New God, was released on January 28, 2021. This story arc is set in Olympos, there Fenyx must overcome the trials from the Gods to earn a place among the Gods. The second DLC pack, Myths of the Eastern Realm was released on March 25, 2021. Based on Chinese mythology, the player plays as Ku, a brave new hero that must help the Goddess Nuwa to restore the balance between Heaven and Earth. The final DLC pack, The Lost Gods, was released on April 22, 2021. In this story arc, the players plays as Ash, a new hero on an epic journey to reunite the Greek Gods including Poseidon and Hades, and bring them back to the Pantheon.

== Reception ==
Reception

Aggregate scores
Aggregator	Score
Metacritic	NS: 78/100; PC: 79/100; PS5: 77/100; XONE: 76/100; XSX: 81/100
OpenCritic	78% recommend 86% recommend (Switch)

Review scores
Publication	Score
Destructoid	7/10
Easy Allies	8/10
Electronic Gaming Monthly	3/5
Game Informer	9/10
GameRevolution	3/5
GameSpot	7/10
Hardcore Gamer	4.5/5
IGN	7/10
Nintendo Life	7/10
Nintendo World Report	6/10
PC Gamer (US)	72/100
Push Square	7/10
Shacknews	8/10
VG247	4/5

Immortals Fenyx Rising received "generally favorable" reviews, according to review aggregator Metacritic. Its narrative, humor, combat, progression-systems, soundtrack, and open world-design received praise. Criticism was directed towards its lack of innovation, with many critics and players criticizing its similarities to The Legend of Zelda: Breath of the Wild.
