= Vaas Montenegro =

Far Cry character

- Far Cry character
- Michael Mando as Vaas Montenegro in a promotional image for The Far Cry Experience web series
- First appearance: The Far Cry Experience (2012)
- First game: Far Cry 3 (2012)
- Created by: Jeffrey Yohalem; Michael Mando
- Portrayed by: Michael Mando

In-universe information
- Family: Citra Talugmai (sister)
- Origin: Rook Islands

Vaas Montenegro is a character from Ubisoft's Far Cry video game franchise. He first appears as the secondary antagonist of the 2012 game Far Cry 3, and was extensively featured in promotional material for the game. Vaas is depicted as a capricious and mentally unstable character who antagonizes Far Cry 3's main character Jason Brody, and also serves as his dark psychological mirror. Vaas is later revealed to be a drug-addicted wayward member of the local community of the Rook Islands, the setting of Far Cry 3, who betrayed his people and aligned himself with the crime boss Hoyt Volker. Outside of Far Cry 3, Vaas' appearances include a live-action web series prequel called The Far Cry Experience, the virtual reality game Far Cry VR, and as the player character in Vaas: Insanity, a downloadable content (DLC) expansion for the 2021 game, Far Cry 6.

Conceived and designed by Ubisoft's development team as a villainous character who is comparable in stature to Star Wars's Darth Vader, Vaas is portrayed in all relevant media by Canadian actor Michael Mando. Mando decided to improvise for his audition and did not follow the developers' script, but they were so impressed by his performance that the character they had in mind was redesigned to match Mando's physicality. The game's story was eventually altered from the developers' initial intentions to accommodate a more frenetic, sociopathic villain in response to Mando's performance. The creative team worked in tandem with Mando to flesh out Vaas' characterization.

Vaas has been well received by the video game community and is often ranked on many lists of the best video game villains due to his depiction as an unhinged criminal. Mando's critically acclaimed performance was considered by many critics to be instrumental to the character's predominantly positive reception, and would influence the portrayal of villainous characters in subsequent sequels.

== Concept and design ==
The lead writer of Far Cry 3, Jeffrey Yohalem, is credited as Vaas Montenegro's creator. For Far Cry 3, Yohalem took inspiration from public discourse about whether video games are good for the player's mental health, and about the concept of "gamification" in society as a whole. Yohalem wanted Vaas to represent a cautionary tale about what could potentially happen to player characters who found themselves caught up in their most indulgent, violent impulses; when interviewed by IGN about his thought process behind Vaas, Yohalem explained that video game developers always talk about 30-second loops, a line of thought within the video game industry which states that players should be put into a situation where what they are doing every 30 seconds is so satisfying that they never want to stop. Yohalem wanted to examine "what made games tick", and then examined the player's involvement in them and whether these experiences are enjoyable for the player, or whether they find themselves confronted by an "uncomfortable development", with this archetype represented by Vaas, a pirate who seems to be "on the knife edge between sanity and mental collapse". Yohalem opined that Vaas' monologue about the definition of insanity is in accord with the philosophies behind Far Cry 3's design, as it "perfectly encapsulates" the dark side of the concept of a gameplay loop which the writing team attempted to deconstruct.

Vaas was not part of the developers' original vision for Far Cry 3's major villains. He was meant to be a bald and muscular man named Bull, who looked similar to "a 300-pound, six-foot-tall bullmastiff dog". A second iteration of the character was named Pyro and had a heavily mutilated body. Michael Mando's audition and subsequent hiring prompted Ubisoft staff to alter their original plans for the character to accommodate Mando's likeness and mannerisms. Bull's physical fierceness transformed into Vaas' emotive and volatile personality, though such features were later downplayed as Mando's portrayal of Vaas enabled his personality to be expressed through subtle mannerisms to achieve the effect of a charming but menacing villain. Initially the character was called Lupo, but the name Vaas was picked once the graphic design was altered to incorporate Mando's appearance. This was done primarily because the developers faced difficulties matching Mando's facial musculature to the model.

Producer Dan Hay compared Vaas to Darth Vader, in that his presence is often short and brief, yet when he appears, he catches attention and galvanizes players' memories. Hay described Vaas as a character that was "very much in your face", which helped cement Jason's early status as a "victim". Yohalem added that Vaas' implied death at the game's midpoint was inspired by the novel To the Lighthouse, in which the protagonist dies midway through the story and the rest of the plot explores her absence.

Yohalem recalled that Vaas was a "lightning rod" with an "incredible gravity", and that the character become the subject of obsession in video game fandom before Far Cry 3 was even released. Yohalem concluded the critical and popular acclaim in response to Mando's performance as Vaas was a "lightning in a bottle" moment Ubisoft experienced for the first time with the character, and observed that the series would go on to explore the different possibilities of a dark central performance. Ubisoft staff originally considered creating a direct sequel to Far Cry 3 and entertained the idea of resurrecting Vaas, but abandoned it to commit to a standalone sequel with Far Cry 4.

=== Portrayal ===
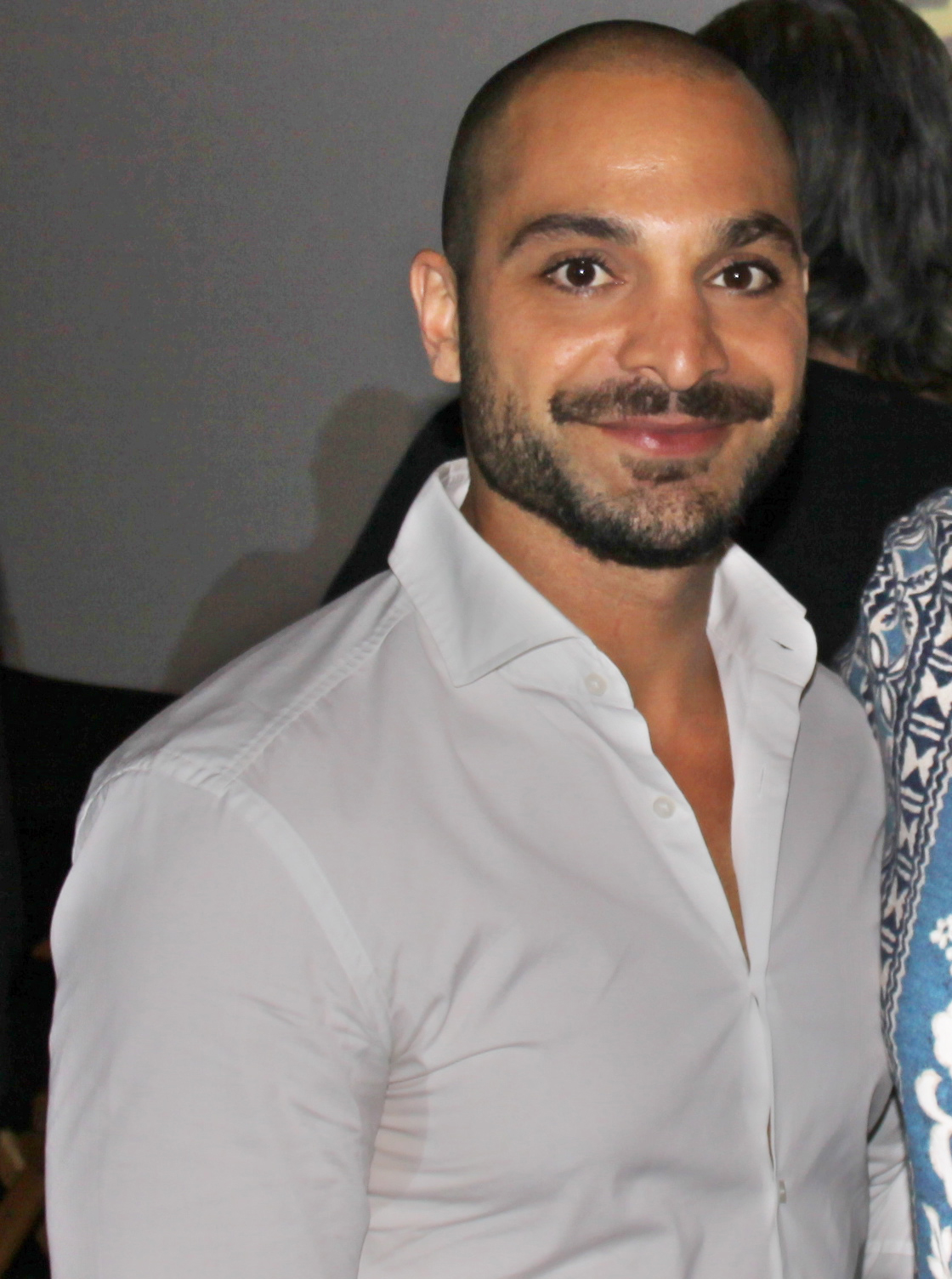
Vaas' voice actor and model Michael Mando

To achieve their goal of creating nuanced characters, Ubisoft's development team made extensive use of performance and motion capture, so that actors could convey more complicated emotions on-screen. According to Anne Gibeault, associate producer for cinematics in the Montreal studio, a character's face and hands convey the most essential part of the animation process. Yohalem emphasized that the eyes are the most essential facial feature as they get noticed first, and that they make a character more emotionally resonant, and so players connect with the characters through eye contact. To perform his role as Vaas, Mando's gestures and facial expressions were translated into animation through carbon-fiber helmets, with cameras mounted about two feet from his face to record every squint, frown, or smile. Yohalem noted that actors have to “create a style between the exaggerated movements of the theatrical and the minimalism of film” for a motion capture performance.

Mando became involved with the Far Cry series in July 2010 when he auditioned for a role then known as "Mr. X". Although he was provided with a script, he decided to improvise in pursuit of creative freedom. During his audition, Mando thought it would be interesting if he were to have his back face the camera, and pretended that he was eating. When Mando started turning around to face the camera, he began licking his fingers until he reached his middle finger, where he then made a crude gesture and continued licking his middle finger. Mando was aware that he was taking a creative risk, and that his improvisation might not be met with approval from the Ubisoft staff who were responsible for assessing his performance; instead, the animation director of Far Cry 3 was intrigued by Mando's creative decision for his audition and asked the casting director to instruct Mando to do it again and take it even further.

Although Mando was hired following the audition, the creative team had insisted on the villain of Far Cry 3 being presented as a physically imposing figure. The concept did not match Mando's more slender frame. Mando had already undergone rehearsals and some footage of his performances were filmed by the time Ubisoft made the short-lived decision to discard the character he had come up with, as it was incompatible with the visual design that the creative team had in mind. Mando recalled that Ubisoft later retracted their decision largely due to the impression he had made during the audition, and brought him back into the project at the last minute. Ubisoft decided to accommodate Mando by altering the character they had planned for to match his actual appearance instead.

Reflecting on his role as Vaas, a character Mando calls his "spirit animal", he described him as "liberating", with an "innocent heart" who so happened to have "gone so far off the deep end". Mando considers himself to be one of the character's creators as he had a lot of involvement in developing Vaas' personality, mannerisms, and motivations with the creative team. Mando recalled that he performed Vaas' monologue to a tennis ball as a stand-in for the player's perspective during filming. Although Mando did not understand why it would turn out to become a compelling scene for many, he suggested that there may be a "truly profound existentialism" with that moment underneath the simplicity of the actual scene. According to Mando, their goal was not to deliberately create a character who appeals to audiences and is insane for the sake of it, but rather a personality who is looking for truth in that moment and who happens to be crazy.

== Appearances ==
=== Far Cry 3 ===
Far Cry 3 opens with montage footage of player character Jason Brody holidaying in the Rook Islands region with his brothers and associates. The footage is captured on a video camera seized by Vaas, who has kidnapped the group and intends to sell them into slavery. After intercepting Jason's escape attempt and murdering his brother Grant, he allows Jason the opportunity to flee from his compound. Jason aligns himself with the local resistance forces known as the Rakyat, who oppose Vaas' pirate group in an armed struggle. Vaas' backstory is gradually revealed with the progression of Far Cry 3's narrative: prior to the game's events, he became addicted to drugs introduced to Rook Island by the South African crime boss Hoyt Volker, who made Vaas his right-hand man and leader of the pirate faction terrorizing the Rook Islands. Vaas and his men assist Volker with his criminal activities such as cannabis cultivation and human trafficking, while inflicting death and destruction on the Rakyat, Vaas' former compatriots who are led by his estranged sister Citra Talugmai.

During one incident, Jason attempts to rescue his girlfriend Liza Snow from a pirate compound and is caught in a trap set up by Vaas, but manages to escape with her through a combination of luck and sheer grit. In a later skirmish, Jason is caught in another trap set up by Vaas, who ties him to a rock and delivers a monologue about the definition of insanity before sending him plunging into a pool of water. Jason survives the ordeal, and later arrives at Vaas' island base to exact revenge. Vaas meets his apparent death by Jason's hand while the latter experiences a hallucination following their confrontation.

=== Far Cry 6 ===
The post-credits scene of Far Cry 6 features one of the main characters, Juan, talking to an unnamed smuggler voiced by Michael Mando. The character is strongly implied to be Vaas, who somehow survived the events of Far Cry 3.

Vaas makes his first appearance as a playable character in a post-launch expansion titled Vaas: Insanity, released on November 16, 2021. Insanity begins at the climax of Jason Brody's final confrontation with Vaas, in which the latter is seemingly stabbed to death. Vaas wakes up in a hallucination, and is guided by the voice of his sister, Citra Talugmai, to reconstruct her Silver Dragon Blade to win her approval as she claims that it is the only way he can escape his mind. Vaas journeys through his mind, revisiting past memories of his life while gathering the pieces of the blade as well as fighting apparitions of Citra, Jason, and the Rakyat warriors. When Vaas succeeds in rebuilding the blade and hands it to Citra, she breaks it again and demands that he keep fighting for her as she sends waves of enemies after him. After a brief struggle and realizing Citra's negative influence throughout his life, Vaas finally rejects her pleas to stay with her and escapes the hallucination. An older Vaas is then shown sitting on a beach on a deserted island as he talks to himself using a tennis ball that resembles Jason. Vaas makes a brief cameo in the crossover expansion pack titled The Vanishing, where he is seen unconscious in the bar where Dani Rojas returns to in the expansion's conclusion.

=== Other appearances ===
A four-part live action webseries named The Far Cry Experience, which stars Mando as Vaas, was released to promote Far Cry 3. Set a few days before the events of Far Cry 3, Vaas captures and tortures to death fictionalized versions of Christopher Mintz-Plasse and his cameraman, who were engaged by Ubisoft as a part of a survival challenge in the "real" Rook Islands that inspired Far Cry 3. Upon his realization that Mintz-Plasse has died from the torture, Vaas learns about the arrival of Jason and his friends in the region from one of his men, and leaves to "welcome" them.

Vaas appears in Far Cry VR, a 2020 virtual reality game where up to eight players can play cooperatively. The premise of the game is that the player characters find themselves marooned by Vaas and have to escape the Rook Islands by shooting their way out.

Vaas is featured in a 2021 tie-in comic series called Far Cry: Rite of Passage published by Dark Horse Comics, which sees Far Cry 6 villain Antón Castillo recounting cautionary tales to his son Diego, one of which involves an account of Vaas' childhood years and the retelling of his eventual "downfall". Vaas' childhood is also explored in the 2021 manga one-shot Happy Vaas Day published by Jump.

== Cultural impact ==
=== Promotion and merchandise ===
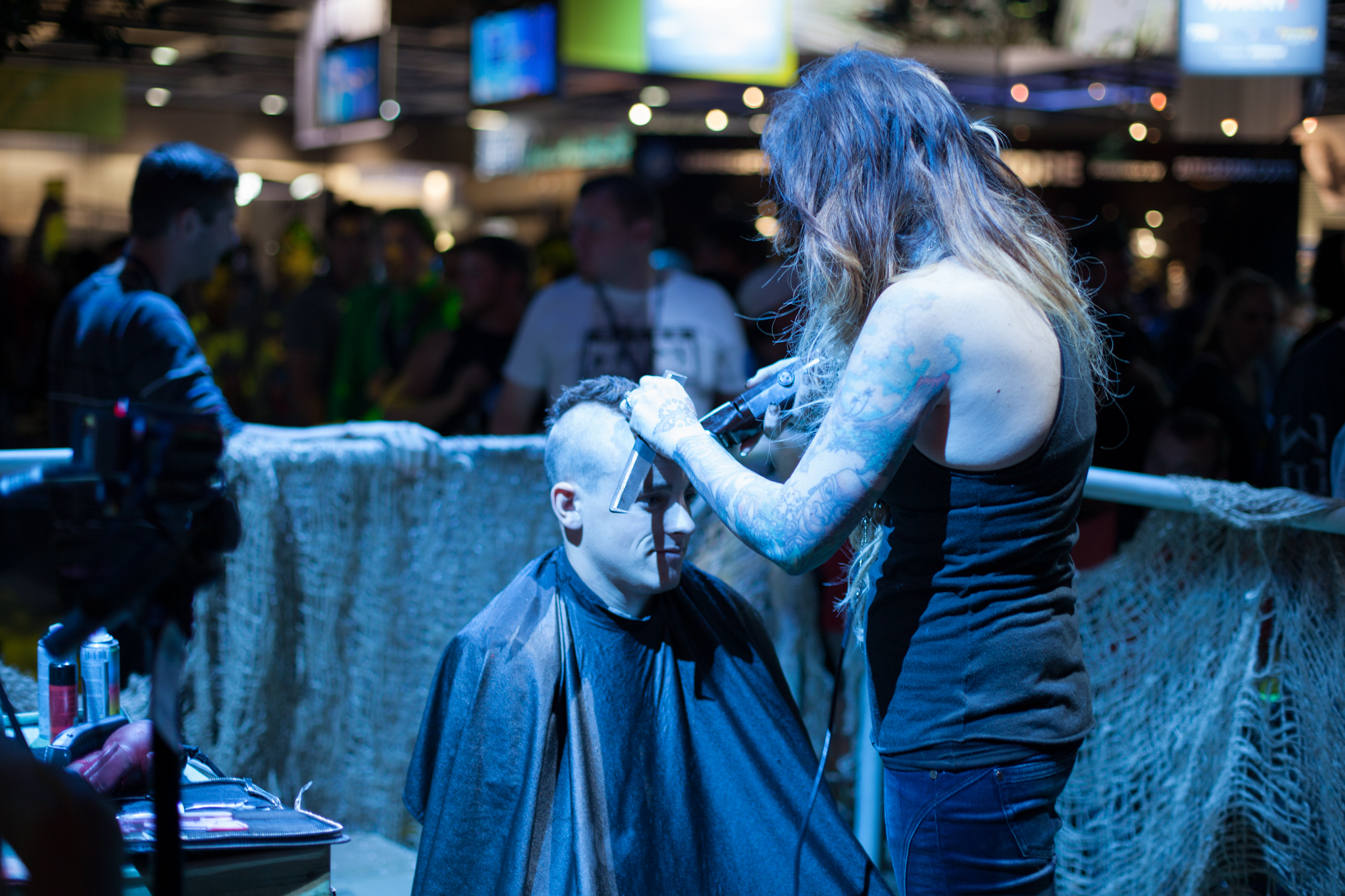
A PAX Prime 2012 attendee having his hair styled to look like Vaas' signature mohawk haircut

Guinness Book of Records described Vaas Montenegro as the poster character of Far Cry 3. The character's initial public introduction was by way of a promotional trailer for E3 2011 in which he makes his monologue about the definition of insanity before tossing the player character over a cliff. To promote Far Cry 3 at 2012's PAX Prime, attendees were given the opportunity to get a haircut to style their hair like Vaas' mohawk. Ubisoft released a limited edition run of lithographic print art of Vaas by artist Ben Oliver for customers who preordered either Assassin's Creed III and Far Cry 3 from the GAME concessions stand at the Eurogamer Expo. European players could also purchase the Insane Edition of the game, which included all pre-order bonuses and all other forms of launch downloadable content (DLC), along with a Vaas bobblehead and a survival skill manual for usage in real situations of danger. A six-inch PVC figurine of Vaas by Syco Collectibles was released in October 2012. In August 2020, Ubisoft released a line of Chibi figurines called "Ubisoft Heroes", with Vaas available as one of the selections.

=== Reception ===
Vaas Montenegro was met with critical acclaim following the game's release. Vaas was awarded Best New Character by Giant Bomb for their 2012 Game of the Year Awards, and by the 4th Canadian Videogame Awards held in April 2013. His "definition of insanity" monologue was named Best Gaming Moment at the 2013 Golden Joystick Awards. Vaas was a nominee for Best Character Design at the 4th Inside Gaming Awards in 2012. For his portrayal of Vaas, Michael Mando received nominations for Best Overall Acting from the 2013 New York Videogame Critics Circle Awards; Lead Performance in a Drama from the National Academy of Video Game Trade Reviewers Awards; and Outstanding Character Performance at the 16th Annual D.I.C.E. Awards. Mando's reprisal of his role as Vaas for Far Cry 6: Vaas: Insanity earned him a nomination for the Great White Way Award for Best Acting in a Game at the New York Game Awards 2022.

Vaas became a viral sensation the moment he was first featured in the E3 2011 trailer for Far Cry 3. Vaas' popularity has led to the character becoming the subject of multiple fan works. A noteworthy Grand Theft Auto IV fan mod reskins player character Niko Bellic with a high-quality, bump-mapped texture that recreates Vaas' character model from Far Cry 3. Ron Whitaker from The Escapist observed that Vaas, "a loud, vivid character that people enjoyed", had caught on with video game fandom as a popular choice for cosplay activities by the mid-2010s. Mando wrote in a 2020 Reddit post that he still receives recognition by appreciative fans in public.

In retrospect, Dale Driver from IGN noted that his "elaborate, violent monologue about the definition of insanity" was an unforgettable debut and became an instant fan favorite. Fascinated by the fact that Vaas was almost cut from Far Cry 3 entirely, Driver argued that Vaas' serendipitous creation changed the course of the Far Cry series, as it provided the series with "an iron-forged identity that influences everything from design to marketing". Tim Edwards from PCGamesN called Vaas one of the video games industry's "most interesting collaborations", and lauded Mando's portrayal of the character as the most believable virtual performance since the debut of Alyx Vance in Half-Life 2, which he highly enjoyed. Shaun Prescott from PC Gamer considered Vaas to be the Far Cry series' best and most fondly remembered villain, in spite of his scary nature. Imogen Donovan from Videogamer.com called Vaas an iconic video game villain, and his “flamboyant, intelligent and completely insane” legacy haunts the Far Cry video game series "like an unfriendly ghost".

On multiple occasions, numerous sources have chosen Vaas as one of the best video game characters, particularly in his role as a villain. In 2016, Glixel staff named Vaas the 49th most iconic video game character of the 21st century, and the character's monologue about the definition of insanity his most emblematic moment. GamesRadar staff described Vaas as the most wonderfully unhinged character of the seventh generation of video game consoles. Vaas is ranked 45th place in IGN's list of Top 100 Villains from film, television, video games, and comics. Vaas placed 7th on a 2018 list of the best villains in video games published by GamesRadar, with staff noting that he has become the "poster boy" for the Far Cry franchise despite only appearing in its third mainline entry at the time of publication. Brendan Lowry from Windows Central identified Vaas' legacy as one of the best game villains in Xbox history as deriving from his "unparalleled unpredictability". Red Bull called Vaas one of the scariest video game villains of all time due to his palpable presence and unpredictability, and noted that he is responsible for making villains the major selling point of the Far Cry franchise going forward. Other sources that rank Vaas in their lists of top video game villains include Game Informer, TechRadar, and the official blog of Middle East Games Con.

Not all reception for the character has been positive. The depiction of Vaas' mental illness was noted by the 2017 publication 100 Greatest Video Game Characters to be a merely "easy-to-use label" for malevolent behavior. Dr. Kelli Dunlap from iThrive Games Foundation concurred that Vaas' characterization evokes a problematic stereotype and compared him to Heath Ledger's version of the Joker as well as Final Fantasy VI's Kefka, all of whom in her view lacked depth in terms of character development because their motivations are entirely defined by their psychotic tendencies. WePlay staff considered Vaas to be a "hackneyed" character and excluded him in their 2019 list of the best antagonists from video game history.

A popular fan theory about Far Cry 6 was that Diego Castillo, the son of Antón Castillo, is in fact a young Vaas. The speculation behind the theory was fueled by Mando's tease of his return to the series via a Reddit post, Diego having a similarly placed scar as Vaas in his live-action appearance, and the observation that both characters wear a red top. The fan theory was debunked in 2021 with the announcement of Rite of Passage, which unambiguously differentiates Diego from Vaas as two distinct characters, as well as a direct confirmation from Far Cry 6 narrative director Navid Khavari in a statement published by TheGamer in May 2021.

=== Analysis ===
==== Cultural identity ====
Although Vaas and Citra are presented as members of the Rakyat (a word that means "the people" in Indonesian and Malay) tribe on the fictional Rook Islands, there has been some confusion over the depiction of his intended cultural identity. Christopher B. Patterson, professor at the University of British Columbia, perceived an inexplicable discrepancy in Mando's portrayal of Vaas. Patterson observed that while Vaas is presumably native to the Asia-Pacific region, most likely Malay in his view, the accent that Mando uses is Hispanic. (Note: Intentional as confirmed by Mando on Twitter) The usage of slang terms such as "white boy" and "hermano" is something the character is alone in among the Rakyat population. Charlie Stewart of Game Rant also remarked on the character's accent and noted that while the Rook Islands are based largely on Indonesia, Vaas' way of talking implies that he grew up speaking Latin American Spanish, unlike his sister, who sounds the same as the rest of the native population. He states that this has been regarded as a bit of a mystery among players and that it is the reason for the many fan theories speculating that Vaas must have spent time outside of the islands in his youth, including theories assuming that Vaas was actually Diego from Far Cry 6, as these theories are attempts to reconcile his irregular manner of speaking with his background. Karina Tapia of Digital Trends named Vaas as an example of a Latino character in video games sporting an exaggerated accent and speaking Spanglish.

Johnny Galvatron interpreted the character as a foreign invader and not as a member of the Rakyat tribe, while Edward Ross took Vaas to be Indonesian in his book Gamish: A Graphic History of Gaming. Angga Prawadika Aji, a lecturer at the Airlangga University in Indonesia, opined that the skin color of the pirate group led by Vaas implied their identity to be native Rooks Islanders. Leo Stevenson of Power Up! described Vaas as "decidedly not white" and cited Far Cry 3 as an example of a piece of media where the hero is white and people of color are relegated to supporting roles or villains.

When defending the game against allegations of promoting a white savior narrative, Yohalem stated that the foreign player character Jason Brody was not originally intended by Citra to be the one to be part of the tribe's ritual. Instead, Vaas was, but he simply refused to participate. Kevin Fox, Jr. of Paste characterized Far Cry 3 as a game with a thrill-seeking white savior protagonist and sociopathic "vaguely ethnic" villain. Fox points out that Vaas became a "villain icon" that is – in his opinion – "weirdly beloved" by the gaming community, despite how problematic the depiction of his and the other natives is. Kotaku's Kirk Hamilton argued that the game would have been better and its white savior narrative from its first half would have become ironic if Vaas had turned out to be the one who underwent the ritual. Ryan Parreno of Gameranx expressed that it was "uncomfortable" that Ubisoft wished to in part recreate Vaas's "unintentionally seductive qualities" for the villain Pagan Min in the sequel game while still trying to avoid a white savior narrative by having the new main character be Asian.

Maurice Pogue of Geeks Under Grace felt similarly, wishing "Vaas or a character of a similar background emerged the hero", noting that Vaas is the only indigenous male given a name, and stated that the "majority of the people populating the island are Austronesian". Pogue also observed that Vaas criticises Jason Brody's attempt to integrate into Rakyat culture (citing this as an example of the "mighty whitey" trope). Regarding Vaas' role on the islands, Pogue felt that he is treated as "yet another expendable native" by his superior Hoyt, who doesn't seem worried for his operations once Vaas is killed. He added that the game would have been superior if Vaas had returned to his birthright as a Rakyat warrior or Citra had succeeded in her revolt without Jason's help, but as it is the game falls into a poor white savior narrative.

In the DLC Vaas: Insanity, Vaas asserts his native identity when one of Hoyt's men informs him and three of his pirates that Hoyt wants them to expand the operation by "clearing" the land of the indigenous population. Vaas reacts negatively to this information and asks his men where they're from. All three of them assert that they were born on the island. Vaas then asks for one of their guns and shoots the informant, saying, "Hermano. We are the natives." He then declares that the next day, they will go to war with Hoyt.

==== Mental state ====
Ross remarked that Vaas is depicted as both physically and mentally scarred. Georgia Hinterleitner states that while Far Cry 3 has several mad antagonists, Vaas is the most prominent of them, and that while he himself claims to be mainly interested in his kidnapping victims for money, "it becomes almost immediately clear that his criminal activities double as a convenient outlet for his deeply warped personality". She adds that his madness manifests in his propensity for lengthy (which she calls "at times barely coherent") monologues, his tendency to lapse into intractable fits of anger at minor provocations, and the pleasure he finds in the sadistic games he plays with Jason, such as letting him flee in order to hunt him for sport. She interprets Vaas as sparing Jason several times solely to have "conversations" with him that are both unprompted and thoroughly one-sided, these being "partly mocking, partly sincere". Hinterleitner compares Vaas to Kefka Palazzo in Final Fantasy VI, as their unstable natures are both based on very old and common ideas of mental illness which establish a direct link between madness, evil, and violence. She does however note that they differ in that while Kefka's madness is tied directly to the plot of the game, Vaas' primarily serves to provoke visceral emotions and reactions in the audience, something which she believes is enhanced by each game's gameplay. Interactions with Vaas emphasize the players' feelings of vulnerability due to the lack of distance from Vaas through the use of the first-person perspective, whose limited field of vision causes a sense of intimacy to the threat in front of the player. She elaborates that Vaas' quick mood swings let neither Jason nor players have time to anticipate or brace themselves against whatever whim Vaas indulges in next.

In his article "First Person Mental Illness", Bernhard Runzheimer cites Vaas as an example of a villain exhibiting sociopathy and sadism. Cecilia Rodéhn has argued that Vaas' racial depiction is tied to the depiction of his madness, characterising him as loud, erratic, sadistic, and violent, similar to how black men have been depicted in games. Charlie Stewart of Game Rant expressed when comparing Vaas to Joseph Seed that Vaas' rejection of his sister's attempts to convince him that he is a "chosen one sent to lead his people" as well as his acceptance of his own sadism and megalomania makes him a far more honest character than Seed. Stewart notes that Vaas never attempts to justify his actions.

==== Masculinity ====
In his review of Far Cry 3 for Entertainment Weekly, John Young characterized Vaas as a gonzo alpha male. This sentiment is mirrored by the game's cinematics director, Robert Darryl Purdy, who described Vaas as an "alpha male", a dominant individual who exploits a bad situation to his benefit, with no bounds and no one to stop him. Purdy states "he's into human trafficking, he's into drugs, prostitution, everything" and summarises that Vaas stands for the aggressive side of the island in the game. Nonetheless, he does note that Vaas still has moments where he is "soft" due to his mood swings. In her book Gaming Masculinity: Trolls, Fake Geeks, and the Gendered Battle for Online Culture, Megan Condis comments on Vaas questioning Jason and his friends' manhoods and making rape threats, with Vaas saying things like "I am the one with the [fucking] dick" and "You're my bitch". She interprets this as the game making literal the rhetoric of rape as shorthand for in-game dominance that exists in online culture by making the power dynamic explicit in the narrative, with rape being a real threat Jason faces. Super Players Online Gamebase's Svend Joscelyne also noted Vaas' emasculation of Jason and observed that these moments serve to make Jason relatable due to the immersive nature of the first person point of view in the game, stating that Jason was an "unrelatable jock before". Contemporary historian Andreas Enderlin-Mahr of the Institut für Neuere Geschichte und Zeitgeschichte (Note: Approximately "Institute for Modern History and Contemporary History", a part of the Johannes Kepler University of Linz. Enderlin's profile (archived June 8, 2023)) cites Vaas as a character who exhibits a plethora of "traits that unequivocally and thoroughly constitute toxic masculinity", with violence, torture, and abuse being the result of his own personal beliefs that lay in the core of his personality.
