= Brie Code =

Canadian game developer

Brie Code speaks at the Indie Soapbox during the 2017 Game Developers Conference.

Rosebridges Starchuk Code is an AI video game programmer, working on Assassin's Creed, Child of Light, and #SelfCare. She ran TRU LUV, a game studio which created experimental games focused on care and characters, which strove to promote mental health.

== Early life ==
Code grew up outside Vancouver, British Columbia. She graduated from the University of British Columbia with a Bachelor of Science in Computer Science in 2001.

== Career ==
Code worked for many years at Ubisoft Montreal as the lead AI programmer, managing programming teams on games such as Assassin's Creed II. She was often the only woman on a team. Her award-winning downloadable faerie game where she was the lead programmer, Child of Light featured a female protagonist and a 25 percent female developer team. She also co-founded Ubisoft Montreal's DEI Initiative. And was the Team Lead AI on Assassin's Creed Brotherhood and Assassin's Creed II.

From 2016 to 2018, Code spent time traveling across the globe, where she consulted game studios, spoke at tech events, and discussed interactive media with those in the field. An ad column ran at GamesIndustry.biz at this time, and Code mentored students at the Film Academy Baden-Württemberg in interactive media.

From 2018 to 2025, she ran a Toronto-based game studio called TRU LUV, which created experimental games focused on care and characters, and was the first startup in Canada to attend the Apple Entrepreneur Camp in 2020. In #SelfCare, a virtual bedroom is filled with calming tasks, such as reading a book, tending to a plant or sorting laundry by colour. The app doesn't use aggressive alerts or notifications, which allows the user to complete tasks in their own time. She said "the most valuable thing a game can do for me: make me forget why I’m angry." #SelfCare was named in Apple’s Best of 2018 Trends of the Year.

The model used and created by Code, titled ❦ BENEFICENCE ❦, was used alongside the ✿ TERRA ✿ engine to develop these apps with the intention of creating compassionate technology that promotes growth in its users.
