= Peck Building =

Repurposed textile factory in Montreal

- Édifice Peck
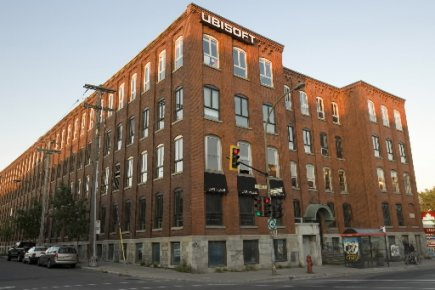
- View from Boulevard Saint-Laurent
- Interactive map of the Peck Building area

General information
- Type: Repurposed textile factory
- Location: Mile End, Montreal, 5505 Boulevard Saint-Laurent, Montreal, QC H2T 1S6; Canada
- Coordinates: 45°31′34″N 73°35′54″W
- Current tenants: Ubisoft Montreal
- Completed: 1904
- Cost: $50,000 (equivalent to $1,879,063 in 2025)

Technical details
- Floor count: 5
- Floor area: 251,000 square feet (23,300 m^{2})

Design and construction
- Architects: Joseph Perrault; Simon Lesage

The Peck Building is a repurposed textile factory in Montreal, Quebec, Canada. Completed in 1904, the five-story brick building initially housed John W. Peck & Co., Montreal's second-largest clothing manufacturer at the time. The company oversaw the Peck's expansion, completed in 1913, and remained the sole occupant of the building until it was subdivided in the 1930s. Textile manufacturing remained the main practice amongst its tenants until the 1990s, when the industry deserted Montreal as a result of globalization.

The workshops were gradually repurposed. The animation software designer Discreet Logic occupied the top floor between 1993 and 1997, during which time it produced technology for blockbuster films like Titanic. When it moved out, the French gaming company Ubisoft took over the space for its recently opened Montreal branch. Ubisoft Montreal, becoming the largest video game studio in the world by workforce, rapidly grew into occupying the entire building.

The presence of the Peck Building in the heart of the Mile End, at the corner of Boulevard Saint-Laurent and Rue Saint-Viateur, played a major role in the development of the neighbourhood. With John W. Peck & Co. and Ubisoft Montreal, it has twice housed the largest employer in the Mile End over the span of more than a century.

== John W. Peck Shirt and Clothing Factory ==
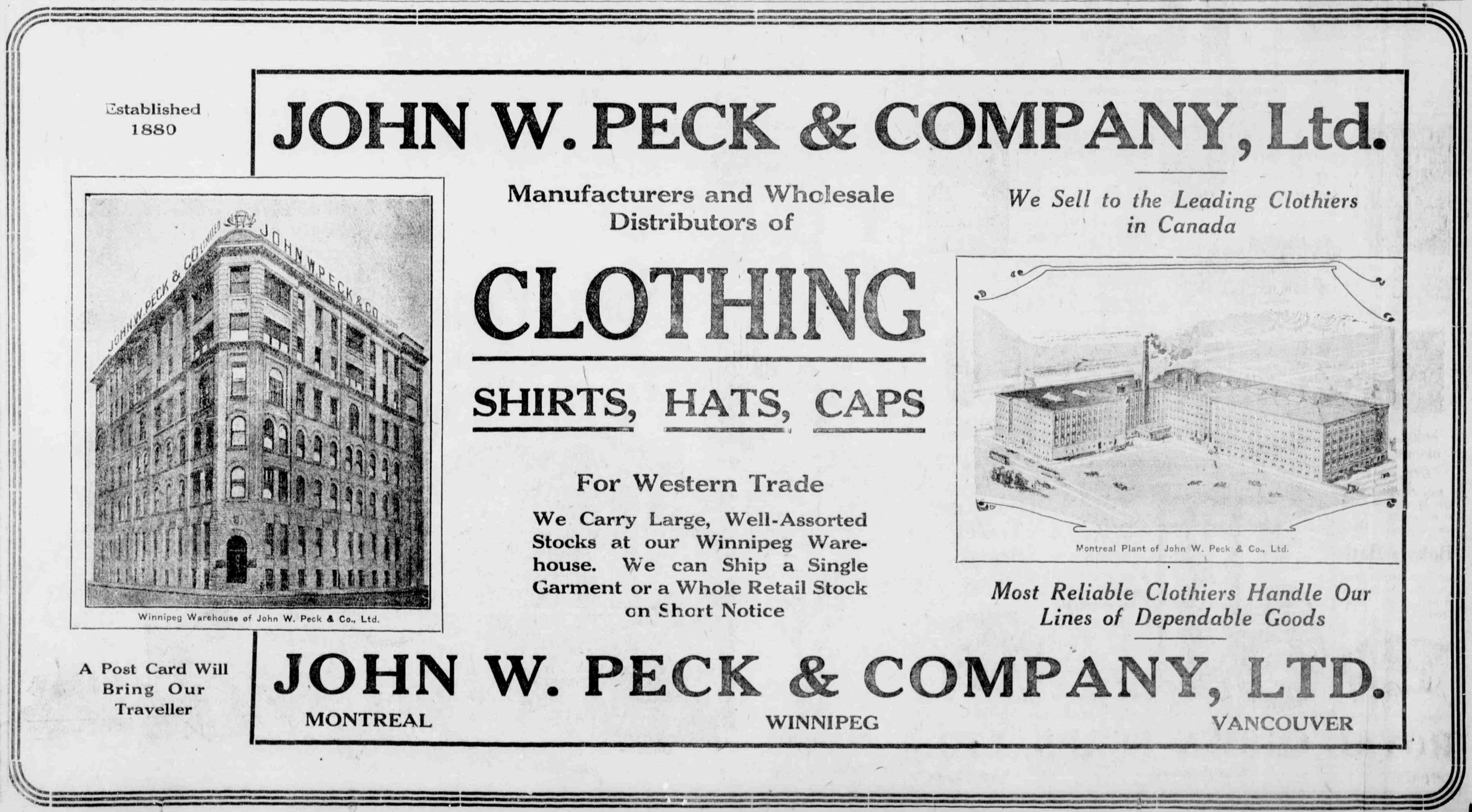
Advertisement for John W. Peck & Co. in the Winnipeg Evening Tribune, 28 October 1916

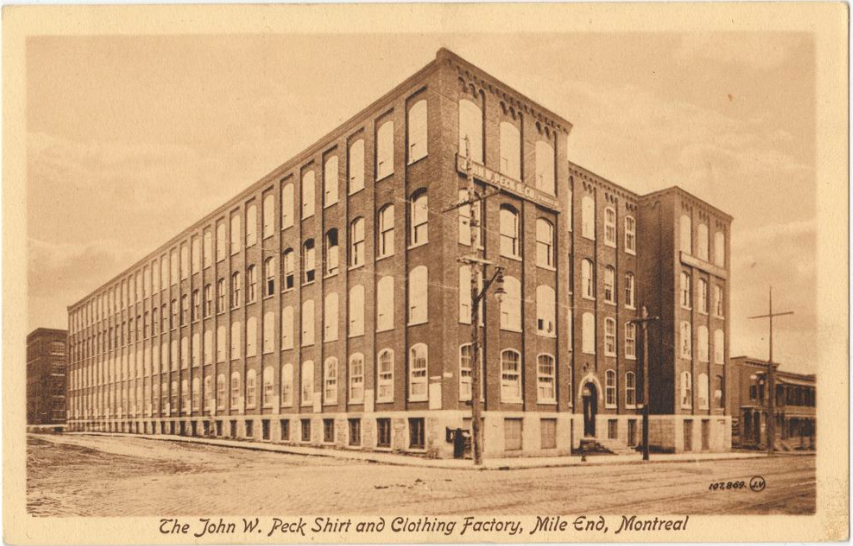
Photograph of the Peck Building, taken between 1913 and 1918, on a postcard

In 1902, John W. Peck (1849-1920), president of the John W. Peck & Co. shirt manufacturer, offered to open a new factory in the city of Saint-Louis (annexed into the city of Montreal in 1910) in exchange for a bonus from the municipality. At the time, John W. Peck & Co. was the second-largest clothing manufacturer in Montreal, where the company was headquartered. On 13 May 1903, Peck signed the contract for a five-story red brick building costing $50,000 (equivalent to $1,879,063 in 2025).

Supposedly completed in the spring of 1904, (Note: The Peck was set to be completed in that period according to the 1903 building contract.) the Peck Building is located in the Mile End between Boulevard Saint-Laurent and Rue Saint-Dominique, at their intersections with Rue Lauretta (now Saint-Viateur). Its initial door number on Saint-Laurent was 2275 while its current one is 5505. The nearby presence of the Mile End train station facilitated rail connections with the manufacturer's two branches in Winnipeg (Note: The Winnipeg warehouse of John W. Peck & Co., constructed in 1893, is also known as the "Peck Building" and is also still standing.) and Vancouver. Financial advantages afforded to Peck comprised a $20,000 (equivalent to $751,625 in 2025) bonus and a 20-year tax exemption. In return, his company was expected to favor Saint-Louis residents in the process of hiring its 300 workers. In 1906, 183 of them were from the municipality.

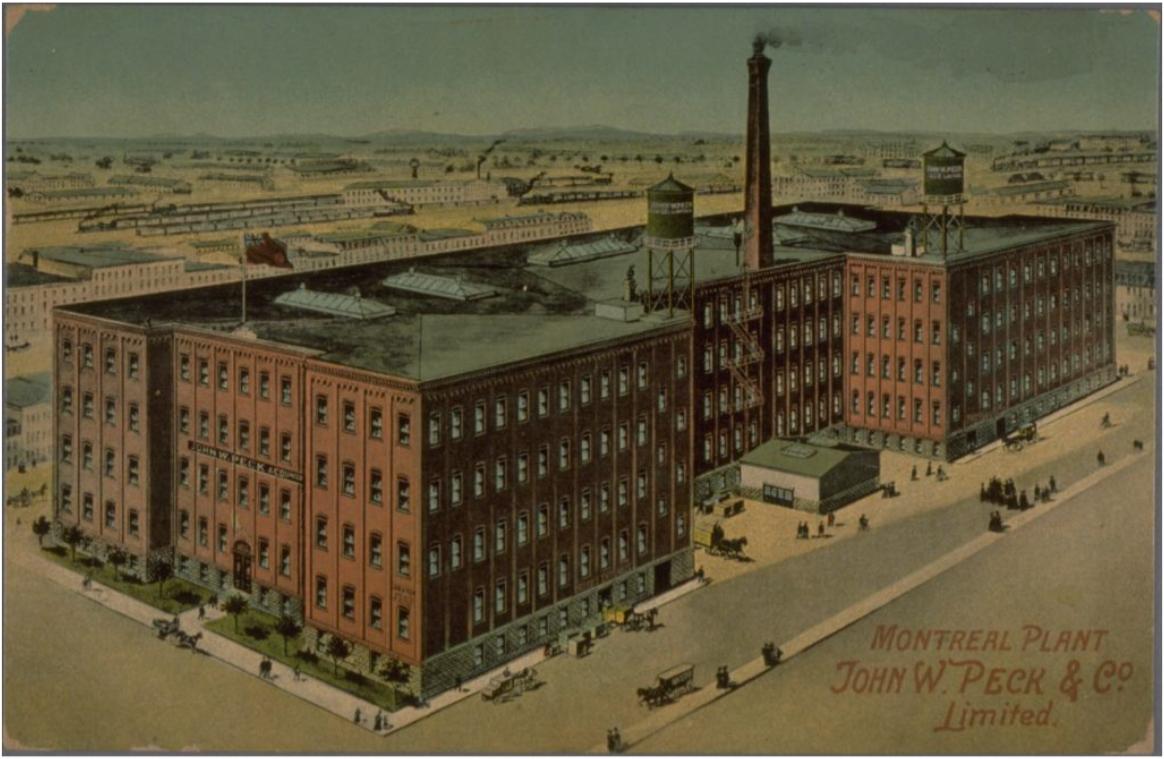
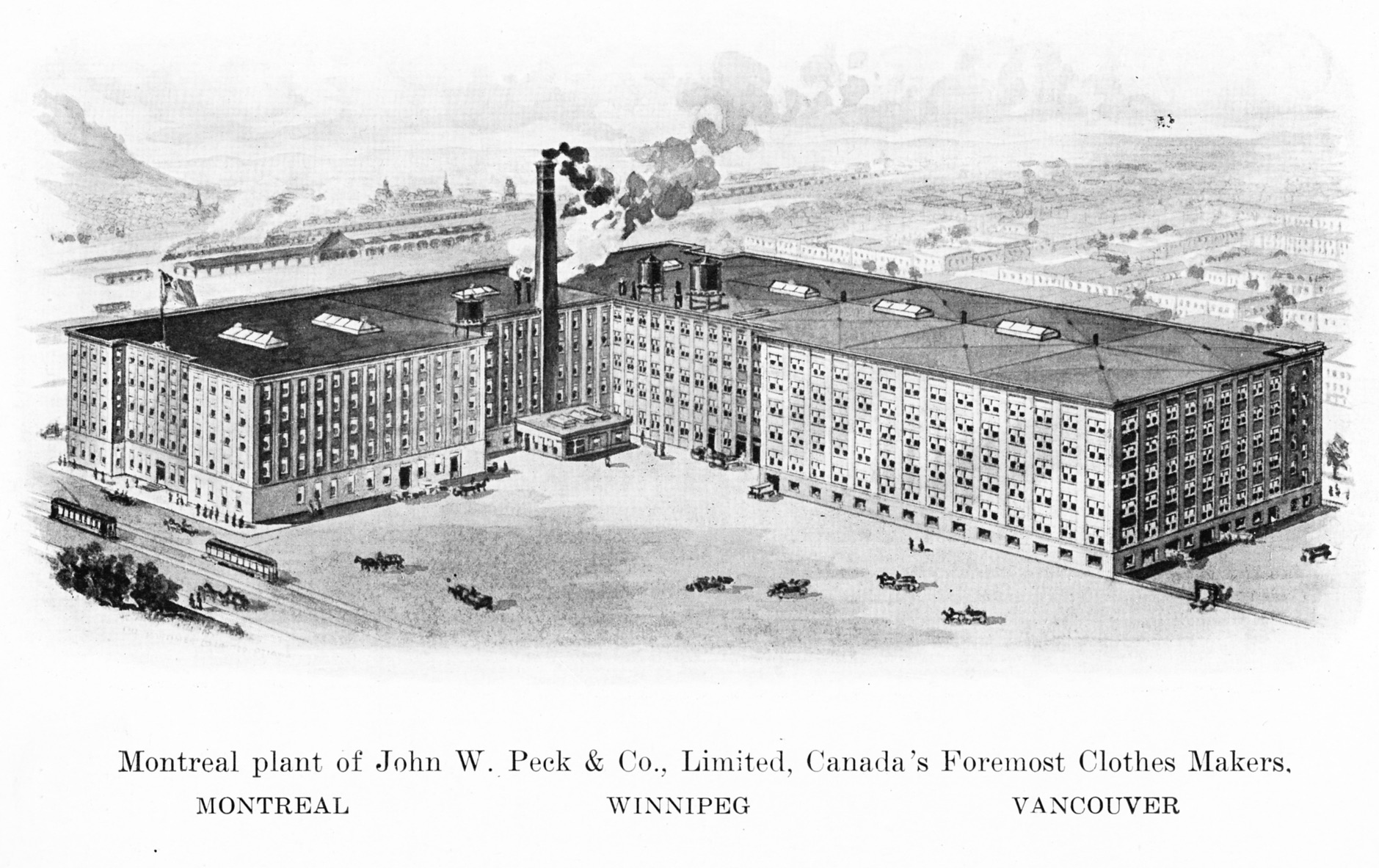
Two illustrations, from the early 1910s and 1915, respectively, show the Peck Building before and after its expansion in 1913. The first one was printed on a postcard while the second one was published in the book Montreal, Old and New

In 1907, Peck submitted a request for an expansion of the factory, with the goal of increasing its workforce to 800. Despite local opposition to further subsidization from the city, the new wing along Rue Saint-Dominique was approved and financed. Costing $135,000 (equivalent to $3,501,564 in 2025), it was one of the largest construction projects of 1912 in Montreal. It opened in 1913.

In 1916, 415 workers of John W. Peck & Co. went on strike to protest reduced wages and an alleged breach of contract. They obtained a pay raise and better working conditions. Another strike in 1925 was less successful: the 181 striking workers were fired and replaced. On 26 May 1920, John W. Peck died from a heart disease.

== Building subdivision ==
Beginning in the 1930s, the Peck Building was subdivided between multiple tenants, mostly other clothing manufacturers. Rothstein Pants occupied the top floors of the building for 45 years. In the 1950s, at least two workers died in elevator shaft accidents: in 1950, 16-year-old Jean-Claude Lamoureux was crushed to death under an elevator and, in 1953, 26-year-old Jean Paul Pierson mistakenly stepped into an empty shaft and fell. That same decade, John W. Peck & Co. ceased activities.

Between 1964 and 1973, numerous large concrete buildings were built in the Peck's surroundings, housing hundreds of clothing manufacturers and contributing to make the Mile End one of the most important sectors for textile in Canada. The textile industry was then the largest employer in Montreal.

With the rise of globalization in the 1990s, the textile industry rapidly deserted Montreal. Various other kinds of businesses, such as architectural firms and art galleries, moved into the Peck. Between 1993 and 1997, the animation software designer Discreet Logic occupied the top floor. During that period, its technology served American blockbusters such as Independence Day (1996) and Titanic (1997). Discreet Logic subsequently moved its headquarters to a warehouse in Old Montreal and was acquired by Autodesk in 1999.

== Ubisoft Montreal ==
In the mid-1990s, Quebec lobbyist Sylvain Vaugeois convinced Yves Guillemot, CEO of the French gaming company Ubisoft, to open a new branch in Montreal. To do so, Vaugeois promised subsidies of $25,000 (equivalent to $46,175 in 2025) per employee per year from the Quebec government, even though those subsidies did not exist. He later convinced then-finance minister Bernard Landry to provide subsidies, using bluff once again, and the deal was finalized on 17 April 1997.

Ubisoft Montreal temporarily occupied a space in the St-James hotel in Old Montreal. It was originally intended to move into a building in the Plateau Mont-Royal, and Ubisoft was close to signing a lease when Yves Guillemot learned that Discreet Logic was moving its headquarters. Because of the loft-style design of its offices, he preferred the Peck Building. Ubisoft Montreal moved onto its fifth floor in early July of 1997 with around 50 employees.

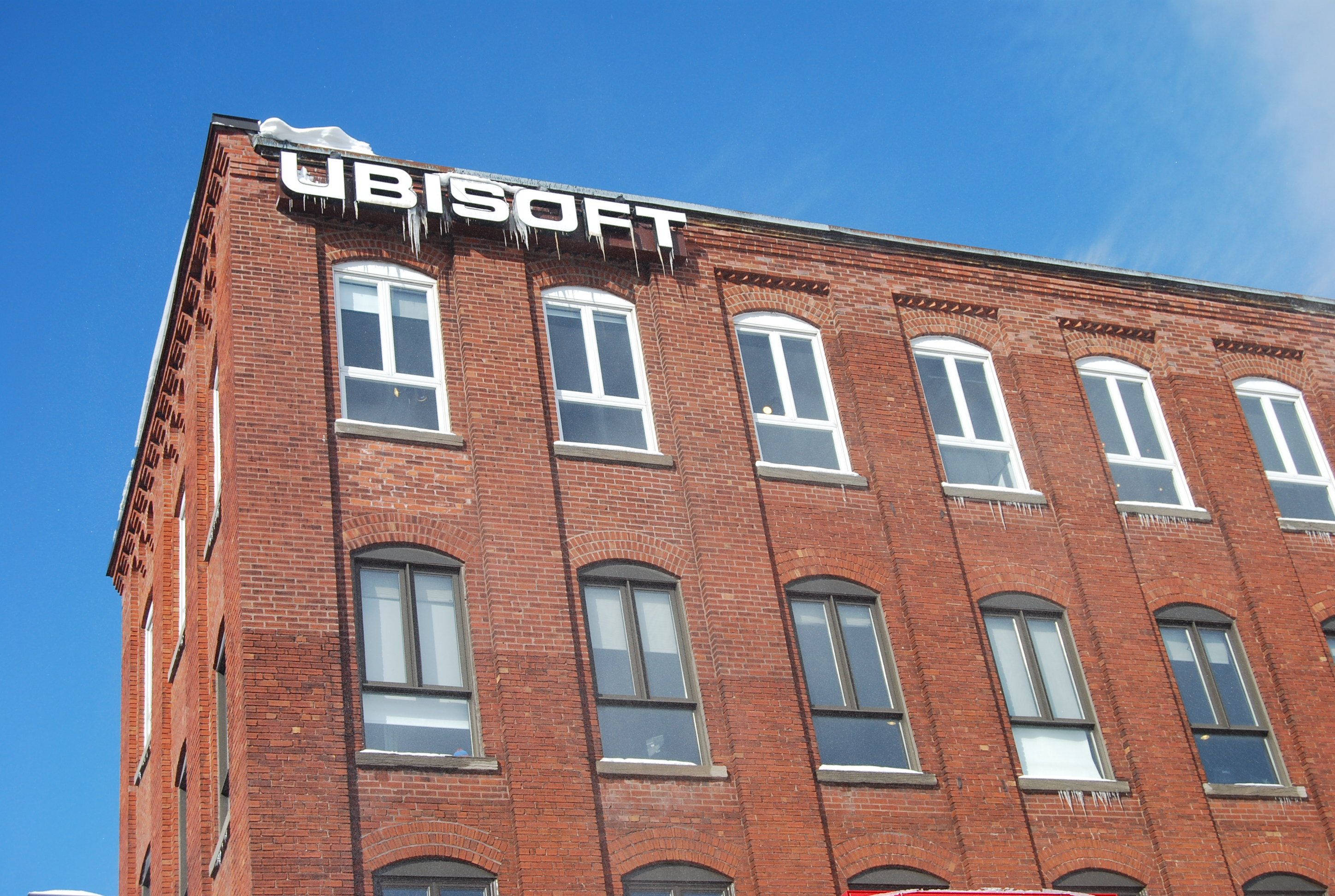
Ubisoft logo on the facade of the Peck Building

Ubisoft Montreal grew rapidly. In 2000, it had 350 employees. That decade, it released successful franchise-spanning games such as Tom Clancy's Splinter Cell (2002), Prince of Persia: The Sands of Time (2003), Far Cry (2004) and Assassin's Creed (2007). American competitors followed Ubisoft to Montreal, including Electronic Arts in 2004 and Warner Bros. Games in 2008, making the city a gaming capital. In 2009, Ubisoft Montreal had 1900 employees, making it the largest video game studio in the world. In 2013, it employed workers of 55 nationalities.

The company grew into occupying all five floors, or 251,000 square feet (23,300 m^{2}), of the Peck Building. In 2011, it considered moving its headquarters to other neighbourhoods of Montreal. Studio CEO Yannis Mallat eventually decided against it, citing the quality of life in the Mile End and an "emotional attachment" to the Peck Building as key factors. Ubisoft and the Peck's owner invested millions of dollars in the building's renovation, including the modernization of its plumbing and air conditioning and the reimagining of its interior design. The company later released other successful games such as Watch Dogs (2014) and Tom Clancy's Rainbow Six Siege (2015). In 2022, it was still the largest gaming studio in the world, with more than 4000 staff.

Ubisoft Montreal is the largest employer in the Mile End, as was John W. Peck & Co. a century before. Its presence in the Peck Building has been credited with the significant redevelopment of the neighbourhood.
