= Jeffrey Yohalem =

American video game designer

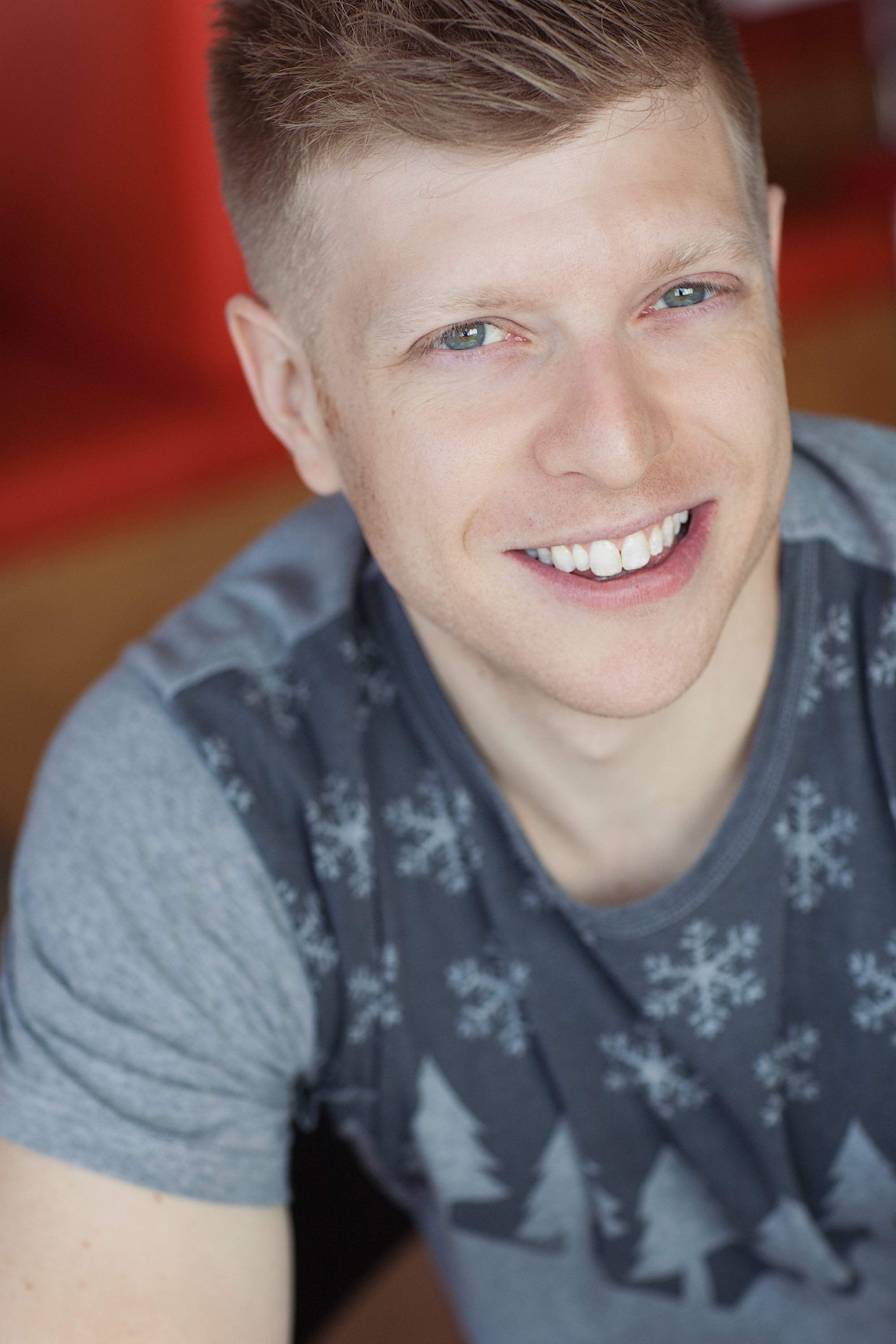
- Born: United States
- Education: Yale University
- Occupations: Writer, director
- Years active: 2006–present

Jeffrey Yohalem is an American director and writer of video games. After graduating cum laude from Yale University with a degree in English literature, he joined the Ubisoft Montreal studio, working on the games Tom Clancy's Rainbow Six Vegas 2 and Assassin's Creed II, before writing Assassin's Creed: Brotherhood, Far Cry 3, Child of Light, and Assassin's Creed: Syndicate. His most recent published project is Immortals Fenyx Rising, released in December 2020.

In the past, he filmed and directed the documentary Human Eaters, and was an intern at The Daily Show with Jon Stewart.

Jeffrey has won a Writers Guild of America Award for his work as lead writer of Assassin's Creed: Brotherhood. He was also nominated for a Writers Guild of America Award and a BAFTA Games Award for his work on Assassin's Creed II. He went on to be nominated for the Writer’s Guild Award for Assassin’s Creed III, Revelations, Unity and Syndicate, making him the most nominated writer in the category’s history.

Jeffrey is openly gay, and has stated that "I grew up playing games as an escape from the bullies at school", which helped lead him to his current career path.

== Writing credits ==
Year	Title	Notes
2008	Tom Clancy's Rainbow Six: Vegas 2	Story designer
2009	Assassin's Creed II	Writer and Designer
2010	Assassin's Creed: Brotherhood	Story by and Lead Writer
2010	Assassin's Creed: Ascendance	Short
2011	Assassin's Creed: Revelations	Writer
2012	Assassin's Creed III	Multiplayer story
2012	Far Cry 3	Lead Writer
2014	Child of Light	Co-creator and Sole Writer
2014	Assassin's Creed Unity	Additional dialogue and the Dead Kings DLC
2015	Assassin's Creed Syndicate	Lead Writer
2018	Nefertari: Journey to Eternity	Short
2020	Immortals Fenyx Rising	Narrative director and lead writer
