= Far Cry 3 =

2012 video game

- Cover art featuring antagonist Vaas Montenegro
- Developer: Ubisoft Montreal (Note: Additional work was provided by Massive Entertainment, Ubisoft Shanghai, Red Storm Entertainment, Ubisoft Bucharest, and Ubisoft Reflections.)
- Publisher: Ubisoft
- Directors: Patrick Plourde; Patrik Méthé
- Producer: Dan Hay
- Designers: Kevin Guillemette; Jamie Keen; Andrea Zanini
- Programmer: Cédric Decelle
- Artist: Jean-Alexis Doyon
- Writers: Jean-Sébastien Décant; Jeffrey Yohalem; Lucien Soulban
- Composer: Brian Tyler
- Series: Far Cry
- Engine: Dunia 2
- Platforms: Windows; PlayStation 3; Xbox 360; PlayStation 4; Xbox One; Nintendo Switch 2
- Release: PS3, Windows, Xbox 360: PAL: November 29, 2012; UK: November 30, 2012; NA: December 4, 2012; PlayStation 4, Xbox One: WW: June 26, 2018; Nintendo Switch 2: WW: Spring 2027
- Genre: First-person shooter
- Modes: Single-player, multiplayer

Far Cry 3 is a 2012 first-person shooter game developed by Ubisoft Montreal and published by Ubisoft. It is the third main installment in the Far Cry series after Far Cry 2. The game takes place on the fictional Rook Islands, a tropical archipelago which can be freely explored by players. Gameplay focuses on combat and exploration. Players can use a variety of weapons to defeat human enemies and hostile wildlife, and the game features elements found in role-playing games such as skill trees and experience. After a vacation goes awry, protagonist Jason Brody must save his friends, who have been kidnapped by pirates, and escape from the island and its unhinged inhabitants.

Ubisoft Montreal collaborated with Ubisoft's global development team, including Massive Entertainment, Ubisoft Shanghai, Ubisoft Bucharest, Ubisoft Reflections and Red Storm Entertainment. The game's development was partially restarted in 2010 after the departure of several key creative staff. The team evaluated the feedback for Far Cry 2 and identified areas that needed to be improved or removed. The team spent considerable time designing the island, which they described as the "second most important character" in the game. Inspirations were taken from films and TV shows such as Apocalypse Now and Lost, as well as video games The Elder Scrolls V: Skyrim and Red Dead Redemption. Michael Mando was hired to portray Vaas Montenegro, an antagonist the team compared to Darth Vader. The game was announced in June 2011 and Ubisoft promoted the game with various companion apps, webseries and crossover.

It was released for Windows, PlayStation 3 and Xbox 360 in November 2012. The game received critical acclaim upon release, with praise directed at its characters (particularly Vaas), world design, visuals, progression, and gameplay, though the game's multiplayer modes received criticism. Despite weak pre-order sales, the game was a commercial success, selling 10 million copies. It was nominated for multiple year-end accolades including Game of the Year and Best Shooter awards by several gaming publications. It has also been cited as one of the greatest video games ever made. Ubisoft supported the game with downloadable content and released Far Cry 3: Blood Dragon, the game's standalone expansion, in 2013. A successor, Far Cry 4 was released in November 2014. The game was re-released for PlayStation 4 and Xbox One in June 2018 and is set to release for the Nintendo Switch 2 in Spring 2027.

== Gameplay ==
Fire spreads rapidly in the game's vegetation, which can be used to kill or distract enemies.

Far Cry 3 is a first-person shooter set on the fictional Rook Islands, a tropical archipelago somewhere in the Pacific, controlled by pirates and mercenaries. Players control Jason Brody and can approach missions and objectives in a variety of ways. They can kill enemies by utilizing firearms such as assault rifles, sniper rifles, grenade launchers, rocket launchers, and explosives like land mines and grenades. Alternatively, players can utilize stealth to avoid the attention of enemies. For instance, players can scout an enemy's outpost by using a camera to mark the locations of enemies, or toss rocks to distract enemies. The stealth approach, which can be done by using silenced weapons and combat knives, can prevent enemies from triggering alarms which call for reinforcements. Skills are collected by gaining experience from completing missions and killing enemies, and are unlocked in three skill trees, themed as the Spider, the Heron, and the Shark. Each skill tree upgrades different aspects of Jason's abilities, with the Spider upgrading his stealth takedowns and hunting skills, the Shark upgrading assault takedowns and health, and the Heron upgrading his long-range takedowns and mobility. As skills are collected, a tribal tattoo on Jason's forearm grows correspondingly.

Rook Islands is an open world in which players can explore freely. Jason can travel using a variety of vehicles including dune buggies, all-terrain vehicles, cargo trucks, jet skis, boats and hang gliding. Later in the game, players will find a wingsuit that Jason can wear. Jason will encounter different friendly settlements where he can shop for weapons and materials and complete side missions including hunting quests and assassination missions. Rook Islands is inhabited by a wide variety of wildlife including leopards and sharks, and the game's artificial intelligence (AI) enables the wildlife to interact with each other to simulate a realistic ecosystem. By hunting different animals and harvesting their corpses, players gain materials necessary for crafting new items such as weapon holsters and ammo pouches. Players can hoard green plants to produce syringes, which heal Jason when his health depletes during combat scenarios or provide other gameplay advantages. Players can climb different radio towers and remove their scramblers. When they are removed, areas of the map are opened up, various points of interest are highlighted and players will unlock a new weapon and gain access to a supply-run side mission, a timed quest in which players need to deliver medicines as quickly as possible from one place to another. As pirates control the island, players can infiltrate and liberate numerous enemy outposts. Once an outpost is retaken, it becomes a base for the rebels which unlocks additional side missions for players. It also becomes a location where players can quickly fast travel to and trade with vendors. A patch was later released to allow players to reset outposts. When exploring the game's world, unscripted events may occur, such as Jason being attacked by wildlife or pirate patrols. Players can complete Trials of the Rakyat missions, which are timed combat challenges; join different minigames including poker, knife throwing and shooting challenges; and gather different collectibles such as relics, letters, and memory cards.

The game features a four-player cooperative multiplayer mode, which is set six months before the events of the main game. The mode features five different classes: Warrior, Rusher, Deadeye, Saboteur or Bodyguard. Players can customize each class's loadouts and weapons. In multiplayer, players can activate "battle cry", which boosts the team's health, accuracy and running speed. The game includes competitive multiplayer modes including Team Deathmatch and Domination, in which two teams compete against each other to capture control points. There is also Transmission, a Domination variant in which the control points are radio transmitters that change location. In Firestorm, a team needs to ignite two fuel dumps held by another team while protecting their own from being set on fire. Killing enemies successively, reviving team members and utilizing battle cry grant players Team Support Points, which can be used to unlock perks like "psyche gas" which causes enemies to hallucinate all players as shadows. The game features a map editor that allows users to create and share custom content. Players can create their maps by customizing landscapes, and by placing buildings, trees, vehicles and units controlled by AI.

== Plot ==
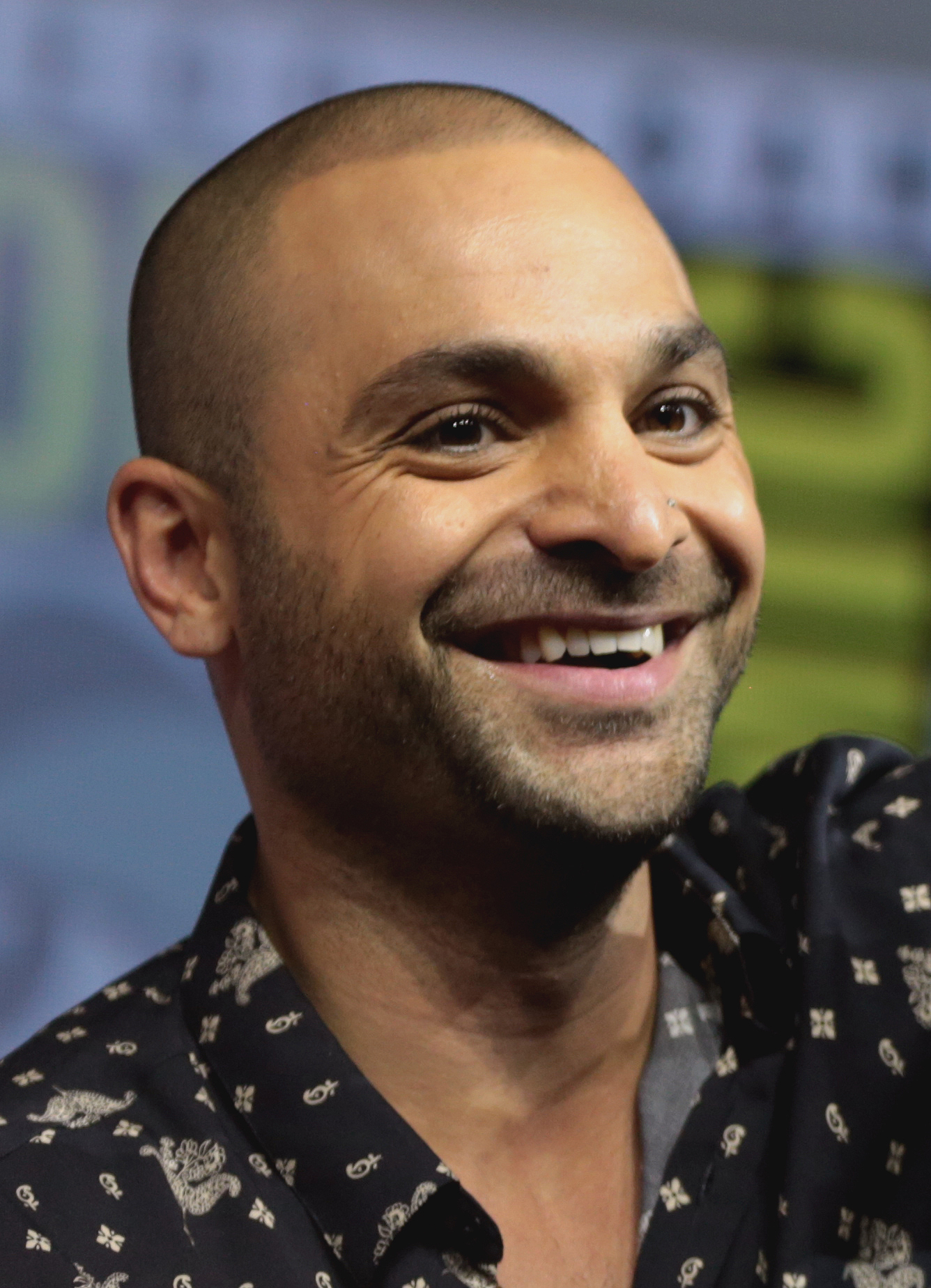
Michael Mando provided voice and motion capture for Vaas Montenegro, one of the game's antagonists.

Jason Brody (Gianpaolo Venuta) is on vacation with a group of friends in Bangkok, Thailand. On a skydiving trip, they unknowingly land on the pirate-occupied Rook Islands, where they are captured by pirate lord Vaas Montenegro (Michael Mando), who intends to sell them into slavery. Jason escapes with help from his older brother Grant (Lane Edwards), whom Vaas kills. Jason is rescued by Dennis (Charles Malik Whitfield), an adopted member of the islands' native Rakyat tribe. Dennis recognizes Jason's potential as a warrior and gives him the Tatau, the tattoos of a Rakyat warrior. While helping the Rakyat, Jason finds one of his friends, Daisy (Natalie Brown), at the house of botanist Dr. Earnhardt (Martin Kevan). Impressed with Jason's prowess, the Rakyat allow him to be the second outsider to enter their sacred temple. After he returns the Silver Dragon Knife, a Rakyat relic, Jason is initiated into the tribe by the priestess Citra (Faye Kingslee).

Aided by Earnhardt and CIA agent Willis Huntley (Alain Goulem), Jason helps the Rakyat retake their island from the pirates while also finding and rescuing his girlfriend Liza (Mylène Dinh-Robic) and his friends Keith (James A. Woods) and Oliver (Kristian Hodko). After several encounters with Vaas, Jason learns Vaas is Citra's brother who betrayed the Rakyat after becoming addicted to drugs brought by his employer, Hoyt Volker (Steve Cumyn), a South African slave trader and drug lord. Jason soon matures into a fearsome and skilled warrior and, revered by the Rakyat, begins to enjoy all the killing while growing more distant from his friends.

Citra rapes Jason while he is under the effects of hallucinogens, after which she asks him to stay on the island. Deciding to remain, Jason bids goodbye to his friends and heads to Vaas' pirate base, discovering Vaas has set up a trap for him. Jason survives but then enters a delusional, dream-like state where he must fight multiple duplicates of Vaas. He eventually reaches the real Vaas and stabs him with the Dragon Knife, (Note: In Far Cry 6 (2021) and its downloadable content, Vaas Montenegro: Insanity, it is implied that Vaas survived his encounter with Jason.) before collapsing. Jason awakens with Citra in the Rakyat temple and promises to kill Hoyt for her.

After reaching Hoyt's island with Huntley's help, Jason meets Sam Becker (Stephen Bogaert), Huntley's fellow operative, who helps him infiltrate Hoyt's army. During this time, Jason discovers that his younger brother Riley (Alex Harrouch) is alive and is being held captive by Hoyt. With Hoyt watching them on camera, Jason beats Riley to maintain the ruse, though he reveals himself when Becker loops the video. Jason works his way into Hoyt's place, and he and Becker plan to kill Hoyt at a poker game. However, as they sit down to play, Hoyt murders Becker after revealing he saw through the looped video. Jason kills Hoyt and his men in a knife fight, losing half a finger in the process, and escapes the island with Riley.

Jason and Riley fly to Earnhardt's house to discover it on fire. The dying doctor reveals that the Rakyat attacked the house and kidnapped Jason's friends. Jason confronts Citra at the Rakyat temple, but she drugs him and captures Riley. Citra tells Jason that she has fallen in love with him, believing him to be a mighty warrior of Rakyat legend and that she will "free" him. Jason dreams of walking a fiery path with the Dragon Knife, with Liza appearing as a monster in his dream. He awakens, holding Liza at knifepoint, and is given a choice to either save his friends or ally with Citra and kill them.

If Jason frees his friends, Citra begs him to stay on the island while an enraged Dennis prepares to stab Jason for his betrayal. Citra jumps in front of him and is stabbed instead, proclaiming her love for Jason as she dies in his arms. Jason and his friends leave the island by boat, with Jason narrating that despite all the killing turning him into a monster, he still believes that in some place in his heart, he is better than this. If Jason kills Liza, he and Citra later have sex in a ritual. Afterward, Citra stabs Jason, telling him as he dies that their child will lead the Rakyat to glory and that he "won." The game ends with a still image of the boat and the Dragon Knife on the beach while the credits roll.

=== Cooperative campaign ===
Six months before Jason arrives on the Rook Islands, ex-Scottish gangster Callum (Stuart Martin), discharged US Army combat medic Tisha (Alana Maria), retired corrupt Philadelphia police officer Leonard (Nigel Whitmey) and former Russian hitman Mikhail (Nick Nevern) find work on the cruise ship MS Astrid. However, pirates capture the Astrid and its passengers after the captain sells them out in exchange for the ship's payroll. The cooperative campaign centers around the four characters fighting against pirates and privateers in the Rook Islands as they pursue the captain.

== Development ==
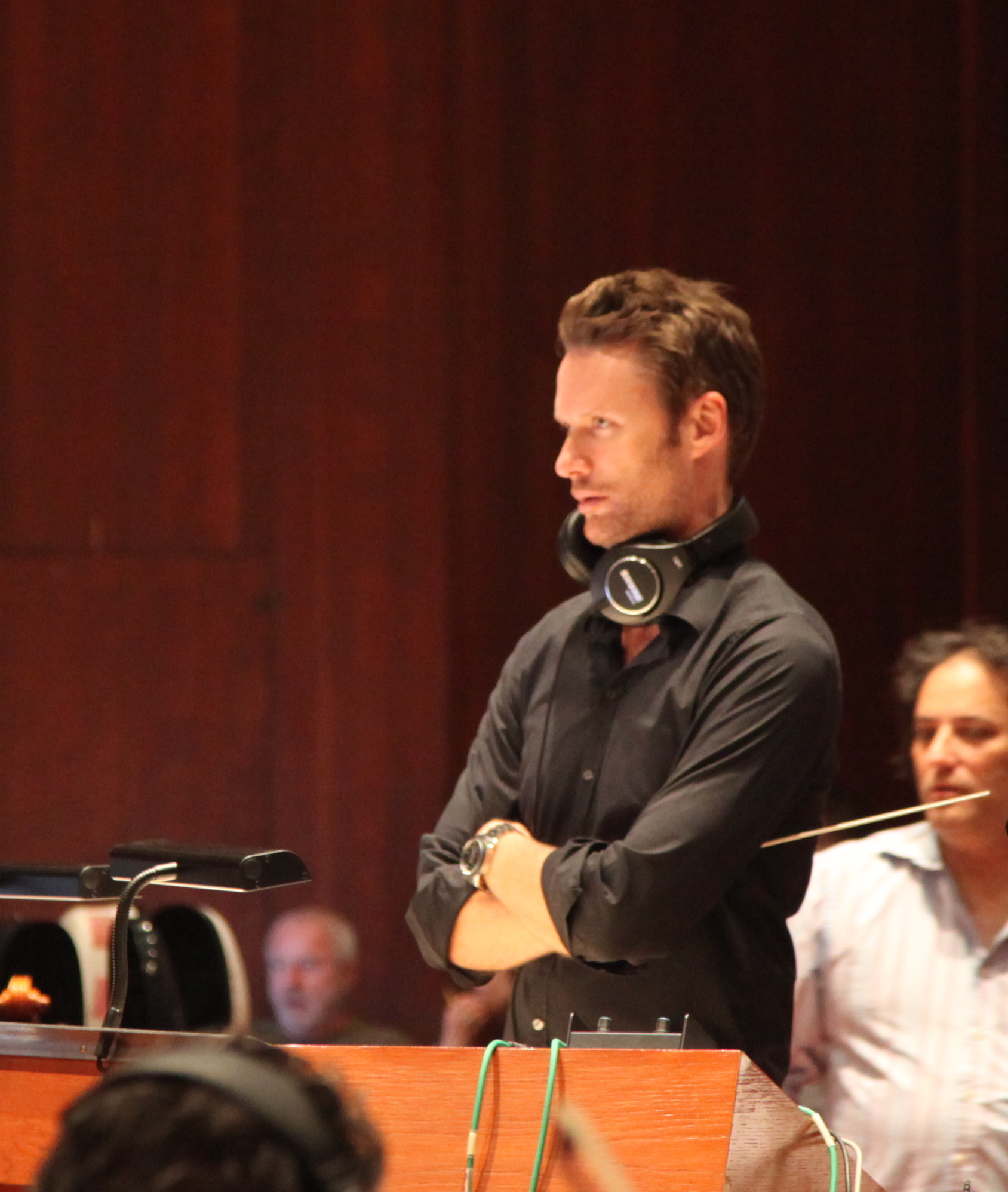
Brian Tyler composed the game's original score.

Ubisoft Montreal served as the game's lead developer and was responsible for creating the game's single-player. It was a global production that involved multiple Ubisoft studios: Massive Entertainment created the game's multiplayer portion, Ubisoft Shanghai designed the missions and crafted the AI of wildlife, Ubisoft Bucharest provided quality assurance, Ubisoft Reflections assisted Montreal on the design of vehicles, and Red Storm Entertainment was responsible for making the PC version and the game's user interface. West Studio created early concept art for the game. The game's pre-production started in 2008, and more than 90 people worked on the game. Far Cry 3 was initially planned to form a single cohesive narrative with the previous installments of the series, though this was abandoned when the game's development was partially restarted in 2010 due to the departure of several creative staff including the original creative director and narrative director. On November 6, 2012, Ubisoft confirmed that the game had been released to manufacturing. Far Cry 3 is the first game in the series to use the Dunia 2 game engine, a heavily modified and upgraded version of the Dunia engine used in Far Cry 2. The Dunia 2 engine was made to improve the performance of Dunia-based games on consoles and to add more complex rendering features such as global illumination.

=== Gameplay design ===
The team avoided creating distinct levels. As opposed to traditional game design, in which designers carefully calculated where and how to place environmental objects on a grid, the team instead experimented with dynamic cover design and utilized an algorithm provided by the Dunia Engine to quickly procedurally generate the layout of a large area. The team would then manually adjust the placement of different objects and test the output. By avoiding repeating patterns, the world would be unpredictable and realistic, and allowed dynamic wildlife and enemy encounters to remain fresh even when players explore the same area again. Spaces are created to be logical and grounded. For instance, some enemy outposts are sites of industries that would be crucial for the pirates to operate at Rook Islands. The team wanted players to believe that the spaces they explore "[exist] for a reason" within the game, not merely for gameplay purposes, and these efforts at creating a civilization helped increase the game world's credibility. When creating the world's space, the game was inspired by The Elder Scrolls series and Red Dead Redemption in how these series reward players with progression. However, the team wished to avoid repetitiveness in gameplay, and created over 250 different hostile encounters and a system that remembers each encounter and only recycle it after extended play. The team believed that this helped raise the diversity of the experience.

The team evaluated the gameplay elements from Far Cry 2 and determined which gameplay elements they should include or improve. Weapon degradation and malaria infection were removed, as the team thought that it made the game less fun. According to producer Dan Hay, Far Cry 2's world was barren and lacked reactions to players' actions. Therefore, the team decided to make the world of Far Cry 3 more lively with the goal of creating "an actual civilization" for players to encounter. In Far Cry 3, players' actions impact the game's world, with Vaas's influence gradually reducing after Jason liberates a hostile camp. The world of Rook Islands was designed to be filled with opportunities and activities for players, enticing them into exploring so that they would not feel bored while traveling within the game's world. The team introduced side quests which allow players to learn more about the history and inhabitants of the islands. The world was designed to be empowering, so that players were free to do what they wanted in the world without being hurried into completing the main quests. The team also attempted to increase the accessibility of travel by improving the game's driving mechanics and introducing fast travel points. Within each mission, players can freely choose their playstyle, whether they choose to eliminate enemies using stealth or firepower, Hay believing that the game respects players' choices. He also believed the team had crafted a meaningful open world, and Rook Island was considered to be the "second most important character". According to Jamie Keen, the game's lead designer, the world was both "alluring and repulsive" and players will "feel seduced by the place and all the people in it". Inspirations were taken from media including Apocalypse Now and Lost. The team decided to return to an island setting, like the first Far Cry, as a narrative decision made during the game's early development. The team believed that the setting mashed well with the story they wanted to create, enabled them to create a world filled with variety, and helped inspire a sense of isolation and discovery.

=== Story ===
Level designer Mark Thompson stated that in a Far Cry game, morality was not absolute and that there was always "a moral gray space". The team intentionally avoided introducing a morality system which would judge players' actions. Gray morality is seen as Jason murdered the pirates in order to rescue his friends and survive on the hostile island. The team took inspiration from Apocalypse Now, The Deer Hunter, and Deliverance when they were writing the story. They understood the game as a first-person shooter, which involves killing many non-playable characters to succeed, and the team wanted a story that embraced the concept of shooting to prevent narrative dissonance. As Jason kills more people, he becomes increasingly tolerant toward violence. Hay stated that players will slowly see the transformation in Jason, as he strays further from who he was at the beginning of the game, and begins to parallel his pirate counterparts. Jason's hallucination sequences were meant to reflect his destabilizing psyche. Thompson described them as "introspective sequences" in which Jason's conscience questions the players' actions. When he was writing these sequences, Jeffrey Yohalem was inspired by the dreamlike levels from Prince of Persia. As players progresses in the game, Jason's friends view him differently and he will begin experiencing post-traumatic stress disorder. Despite his explanatory closing narrative, the game left room for interpretation. Ultimately, Hay stated that the story was about the cost of becoming a hero, and how heavy the toll can be in one's journey.

Yohalem designed a story that examines the minds of players. The game was described as being "self-aware", reacting to players' style of play. Yohalem, in particular, wished to contrast the difference between players and the playable character, in which players have fun playing the game, while Jason is on a terrible journey killing people. Being able to freely explore the game world and enjoy the activities it can offer, while ignoring the urgency to save Jason's friends, was meant to reflect players' inner mindset. According to Yohalem, the game asks whether players are willing to "kill these characters in the game in order to finish your entertainment". This creates a sense of discomfort to players. Yohalem, when creating the story and the world, was inspired by Pulp Fiction, A History of Violence, Requiem For a Dream and Exit Through The Gift Shop. While Far Cry 2 had an oppressive atmosphere, the game world was designed to be evoke an opposite feeling, with Yohalem adding that it was "so sweet, it's like getting an overdose on drugs"; Yohalem stated that the game asked why players would willingly trap themselves in a beautifully-crafted virtual world instead of spending time with real people. The story was widely criticized for racism and colonialism, though Yohalem defended it by calling the game "the opposite of Avatar" as the local indigenous people did not need Jason's help and he was being manipulated into doing what the people wanted. He insisted that players need to approach the game like a riddle so as to understand the subtext and clues that the game offers. Quotes from Alice in the Wonderland was added late in the game's development to hint at its subtext.

Initially, the game's primary villain was named Bull, a bald and muscular man who looked similar to "a 300-pound, six-foot-tall bullmastiff dog". The character was redesigned after Michael Mando auditioned for the role, as his physicality was very different from what the developers had planned. Bull's physical fierceness transformed into the villain's emotive and volatile personality. A second iteration of the character was named Pyro and featured a heavily mutilated body, though such features were later removed as Mando's portrayal of Vaas enabled his personality to be expressed through subtle mannerisms. The team envisioned him to be a charming but menacing villain. Hay compared Vaas to Darth Vader, in which his presence is often short and brief, yet when he appears, he catches attention and galvanizes players' memories. Hay described Vaas as a character that was "very much in your face", which helped cementing Jason's early status as a "victim". Yohalem added that Vaas's death at the game's midpoint was inspired by the novel To the Lighthouse, in which the protagonist died midway through the story and the rest of the plot explores her absence. To create nuanced characters, the team utilized motion capture so that actors could convey more-complicated emotions on-screen. Enemies are controlled by AI which was designed to be believable, such as when untrained enemies would make mistakes during combat. Elias Toufexis initially was chosen to voice Jason Brody, though he was replaced by Gianpaolo Venuta two years later.

=== Multiplayer ===
Massive Entertainment handled the game's multiplayer development. According to David Polfeldt, the managing director of Massive, the team was involved at the early stage of development and the opportunity helped diversify their portfolio, as the team had only had experience working on real-time strategy games like World in Conflict. Magnus Jensen, the multiplayer portion's creative director, stated that the multiplayer carries the theme of insanity from the single-player. To accomplish this, the competitive multiplayer allows players to use supernatural elements to combat enemies, while the cooperative multiplayer features characters that are "as unhinged as any of the characters" in the single-player mode. The multiplayer was also said to include elements commonly found in independent games and social games. The game's multiplayer functionality was shut down on September 1, 2022.

== Promotion and release ==
Far Cry 3 was announced in June 2011 during Ubisoft's press conference at E3 2011. A closed beta for the game's multiplayer portion was launched for players who purchased Tom Clancy's Ghost Recon: Future Soldier at GameStop before May 22, 2012. A companion app named Far Cry The Outpost was released for iOS and Android to allow players to manage their multiplayer loadout and monitor their progress. A UK-exclusive companion app named "Insanity Mirror" imagines what players would look like if they are trapped on an island. A Facebook app named "Holiday From Hell", which allows players to create and customize their own postcard, was released in September 2012. The first 2,000 participants had their own postcard printed and delivered by Royal Mail for free. To promote the game at PAX East, players who shaved their head or received a permanent tribal tattoo would receive a free copy of the game. At PAX Prime, attendees can shave their head into a mohawk to look like Vaas. Ubisoft commissioned Michael Lambert, a Minecraft enthusiast, and artists Axel Janssen and Yohann Delcourt to create a custom map and texture pack mimicking Far Cry 3's setting and characters within the popular indie game Minecraft. The Minecraft texture pack was released, along with a Far Cry 3-Minecraft custom adventure map, on October 26, 2012. A four-part webseries named Far Cry: The Experience, which stars Mando as Vaas and Christopher Mintz-Plasse as himself, was released.

The game was initially set to be released on September 4, 2012, for Microsoft Windows, PlayStation 3 and Xbox 360. This was delayed to November 29 in Europe, the Middle East and Africa (EMEA) regions, November 30 in the UK, and December 4 in the US, to give additional time to complete the game. Far Cry 3 would not appear on Nintendo's Wii U due to the system not being an onset of development, despite Ubisoft themselves being major supporters of the system at launch a few weeks before Far Cry 3's launch. On launch date, the Windows version of the game suffered from server issues which temporarily caused the game to be unplayable. Players who pre-ordered the game gained access to "The Lost Expeditions" pack which includes two single-player missions named The Forgotten Experiment and Ignition in the Deep and a flare gun for multiplayer. Players who preordered the game at GameStop gained access to the "Monkey Business Pack", which adds four missions to the game. European players could also purchase the Insane Edition which includes all pre-order bonuses and all other forms of launch downloadable content (DLC), along with a Vaas bobblehead and a survival skill manual for usage in real situations of danger. Uplay users can unlock bonus content ranging from a new mission to customizable items. The "Monkey Business Pack" and "The Lost Expeditions" were later bundled with another two DLC packs, namely "The Warrior" and "The Predator Pack" in the Deluxe Bundle, which was released on January 17, 2013. Not included in the bundle were "High Tides", a PlayStation 3-exclusive DLC that concludes the cooperative multiplayer modes with two missions.

Far Cry 3: Blood Dragon, the game's standalone expansion, was released in May 2013. Blood Dragon was a parody of 1980s action films, cartoons and video games and takes place on a retro-futuristic open world island with players assuming the action role of the military cyborg Sergeant Rex "Power" Colt. Far Cry 3 and Blood Dragon were later bundled with Far Cry 2 and Far Cry Classic in a compilation game named Far Cry: The Wild Expedition for PS3, Xbox 360, and PC. Starting from May 29, 2018, players who purchased Far Cry 5's season pass or the Gold Edition on PC can gain access to the Classic Edition, the game's re-release for PlayStation 4 and Xbox One. For console users, it features higher resolution graphics than the original Far Cry 3 releases including support for QHD resolution on the PS4 Pro and Xbox One X, but with an FPS cap of 30FPS that (unlike the original Far Cry 3) cannot be boosted to 60FPS. The Classic Edition was made available for standalone purchase on June 26, 2018.

In January 2026 Ubisoft released a patch for Far Cry 3 Classic Edition which boosted the framerate to 60fps on the PlayStation 5 and Xbox Series X/S for the PlayStation 4 and Xbox One versions of the game. In September 2026, Ubisoft announced the Nintendo Switch 2 version along with the standalone expansion, Far Cry 3: Blood Dragon, both set to release in early 2027.

== Reception ==
=== Critical reception ===
Reception

Aggregate score
Aggregator	Score
Metacritic	PC: 88/100; PS3: 90/100; X360: 91/100; PS4: 70/100

Review scores
Publication	Score
1Up.com	B−
Destructoid	8/10
Eurogamer	10/10
Game Informer	9/10
GameSpot	9/10
GamesRadar+	4/5
IGN	9/10
PC Gamer (UK)	89/100
Polygon	9/10

James Stephanie Sterling from Destructoid felt the game had a larger emphasis on storytelling when compared with its predecessors, and liked the game's cast of characters. Sterling called the story "tightly written" and "stylishly presented". Matt Bertz from Game Informer agreed, calling the story "compelling". The game's cast of side-characters was praised for their acting and characterization. Mando's performance as Vaas was praised by critics: Ryan Taljonick from GamesRadar stated that his presence made some missions memorable. Mitch Dyer from IGN noted that Jason is a relatable character due to his many flaws. Kevin VanOrd from GameSpot questioned some of the narrative decisions, such as the heavy emphasis on drug use. Other story beats, such as Jason's transformation into an effective combatant within a short period of time and the handling of Vaas's death in the story, were criticized. Bob Mackey of 1Up.com felt that the game lacked cultural commentary that it promised. Both Bramwell and Tom Francis from PC Gamer remarked on the main quest's linear design, which Francis described as a "guided tour of all the clumsiest ways to mash story and videogames together until both of them break". Arthur Gies from Polygon criticized the story for being clichéd. The game's handling of subject matter like misogyny and homophobia and its usage of the white savior trope were also criticized.

The island setting received critical acclaim. Tom Bramwell from Eurogamer stated that the island was the main reason he became captivated by the game, mainly due to the game's diverse activities and the island's rich history. He liked the artificial intelligence of the game's wild animals, which makes the game unpredictable. Bertz agreed, saying that the environment was "varied" and "gorgeous", and appreciated its design for accommodating multiple playstyles. VanOrd appreciated the effort Ubisoft had put into designing Rook Islands, saying that "Far Cry 3 isn't so much about the story as it is about its world", and called the world "enthralling" and "focused". VanOrd also liked the ecology, which interacts with each other and helped make the world more believable. Dyer enjoyed finding the game's collectibles, which helped enrich the island's history. According to Dyer, the game had an "astonishing sense of place" and "captivating culture and scenery". Arthur Gies from Polygon was also impressed by the world design, which he felt allowed various emergent events to occur and systems to flow and intertwine with each other. Taljonick added that the emergent gameplay contributed to some personal stories which are unique to each player.

Critics generally enjoyed the gameplay. Sterling praised the freedom given to players to approach objectives, though they felt that many of the side-objectives became repetitive very quickly. They praised the game's increased accessibility, though they noted that travel was an annoyance for them. Bramwell appreciated players' freedom, citing stealth as one of the game's strengths and noting combat's adaptive nature. VanOrd agreed, calling stealth "a blast" and praised the game for presenting opportunities that allow players to experiment and be creative. Dyer agreed, saying that the game's action can be exhilarating and that actions can be chained together. Bertz and Taljonick liked the gameplay improvements such as the inclusion of fast-travel points and the removal of weapon malfunctioning, though Bertz was disappointed that the AI-controlled human enemies were not more adaptive. VanOrd liked the gunplay and vehicular control, and the game's sense of progression presented due to the inclusion of role-playing game elements, though he and Francis lamented the respawning enemies, which they felt were frustrating. Gies praised the game's wealth of content, though he warned that such could be "intimidating".

The multiplayer component of the game was considered as a disappointment. Sterling remarked that the game's competitive multiplayer lacked new ideas and compared it to Call of Duty. They liked the efforts put into cooperative multiplayer which they compared to Left 4 Dead, but criticized the lack of characterization for the player avatars. Francis called the cooperative multiplayer "fun", though he was disappointed by the lack of a server browser. Bramwell called the multiplayer components the least interesting parts of the game, though he appreciated the presence of bonus content, saying that it made for a generous package. Bertz called the cooperative mode "a fun diversion", though he lamented clumsy movements and sub-par hit-detection mechanics as factors that hindered competitive multiplayer's appeal. VanOrd felt that the cooperative mode did not use the excellent open world created by the team, though he praised the "unique twists" featured in the progression system. Dyer had a more negative view on the multiplayer components, calling them uninspired and criticizing the confusing map design. He felt that the cooperative component made the game a "mindless shooter with senseless direction", and further criticized the lack of difficulty scaling.

=== Sales ===
The game's preorder sales were below Ubisoft's expectations. In the US, it was the sixth-bestselling video game according to NPD Group. It was also the second-biggest launch for a video game in the region in December. In January 2013, it became the second-bestselling game, trailing behind Black Ops II. In the UK, it was the ninth-biggest launch for a video game in 2012. In its week of release, it became the second-bestselling retail game, only behind Call of Duty: Black Ops II. Far Cry 3 later toppled Black Ops II as the bestselling game of the week during Christmas.

More than 4.5 million copies were shipped to retailers in December 2012. In October 2014, Ubisoft announced that approximately 10 million copies of the game had been sold.

=== Awards ===
Major awards and nominations
Year	Award	Category	Result	Ref.
2013	New York Videogame Critics Circle Awards	Best Game	Nominated	
2013	New York Videogame Critics Circle Awards	Best Writing in a Game	Nominated	
2013	New York Videogame Critics Circle Awards	Best World (Rook Islands)	Nominated	
2013	New York Videogame Critics Circle Awards	Best Overall Acting (Michael Mando as Vaas Montenegro)	Nominated	
2013	16th Annual D.I.C.E. Awards	Game of the Year	Nominated	
2013	16th Annual D.I.C.E. Awards	Action Game of the Year	Nominated	
2013	16th Annual D.I.C.E. Awards	Outstanding Achievement in Game Direction	Nominated	
2013	16th Annual D.I.C.E. Awards	Outstanding Achievement in Animation	Nominated	
2013	16th Annual D.I.C.E. Awards	Outstanding Achievement in Art Direction	Nominated	
2013	16th Annual D.I.C.E. Awards	Outstanding Achievement in Character - Male or Female (Vaas Montenegro)	Nominated	
2013	16th Annual D.I.C.E. Awards	Outstanding Achievement in Original Music Composition	Nominated	
2013	9th British Academy Games Awards	Best Game (Dan Hay, Patrick Plourde, Patrik Methe)	Nominated	
2013	9th British Academy Games Awards	Action (Dan Hay, Patrick Plourde, Patrik Methe)	Won	
2013	9th British Academy Games Awards	Artistic Achievement (Jean-Alexis Doyon, Genseki Tanaka, Vincent Jean)	Nominated	
2013	9th British Academy Games Awards	Audio Achievement (Dan Hay, Tony Gronick, Brian Tyler)	Nominated	
2013	9th British Academy Games Awards	Game Design (Patrick Methè, Jamie Keen)	Nominated	
2013	9th British Academy Games Awards	Story (Jeffrey Yohalem, Lucien Soulban, Li Kuo)	Nominated	
2013	National Academy of Video Game Trade Reviewers Awards	Game of the Year	Nominated	
2013	National Academy of Video Game Trade Reviewers Awards	Art Direction, Contemporary	Nominated	
2013	National Academy of Video Game Trade Reviewers Awards	Control Design, 3D	Won	
2013	National Academy of Video Game Trade Reviewers Awards	Direction in a Game Cinema	Nominated	
2013	National Academy of Video Game Trade Reviewers Awards	Game Design, Franchise	Nominated	
2013	National Academy of Video Game Trade Reviewers Awards	Graphics, Technical	Won	
2013	National Academy of Video Game Trade Reviewers Awards	Lead Performance in a Drama (Michael Mando as Vaas Montenegro)	Nominated	
2013	National Academy of Video Game Trade Reviewers Awards	Lighting/Texturing	Nominated	
2013	National Academy of Video Game Trade Reviewers Awards	Original Dramatic Score, Franchise	Nominated	
2013	National Academy of Video Game Trade Reviewers Awards	Sound Effects	Nominated	
2013	National Academy of Video Game Trade Reviewers Awards	Writing in a Drama	Nominated	
2013	National Academy of Video Game Trade Reviewers Awards	Game, Franchise Action	Nominated	
2013	Game Developers Choice Awards	Best Technology	Won	
2013	Game Developers Choice Awards	Best Visual Arts	Nominated	
2013	Game Audio Network Guild Awards	Audio of the Year	Nominated	
2013	Game Audio Network Guild Awards	Sound Design of the Year	Nominated	
2013	Game Audio Network Guild Awards	Best Dialogue	Won	
2013	Game Audio Network Guild Awards	Best Audio Mix	Won	
2013	Golden Joystick Awards	Game of the Year	Nominated	
2013	Golden Joystick Awards	Best Visual Design	Nominated	
2013	Golden Joystick Awards	Best Gaming Moment (The Definition of Insanity)	Won	
2013	The 4th Canadian Videogame Awards	Game of the Year	Won	
2013	The 4th Canadian Videogame Awards	Best Console Game	Nominated	
2013	The 4th Canadian Videogame Awards	Best Animation	Won	
2013	The 4th Canadian Videogame Awards	Best Game Design	Won	
2013	The 4th Canadian Videogame Awards	Best Game Innovation	Nominated	
2013	The 4th Canadian Videogame Awards	Best New Character (Vaas Montenegro)	Won	
2013	The 4th Canadian Videogame Awards	Best Visual Arts	Won	
2013	The 4th Canadian Videogame Awards	Best Writing	Nominated	
2013	The 4th Canadian Videogame Awards	Future Shop Fans' Choice Award	Won	

== Legacy ==
The game's success helped elevate the franchise's status, which is now viewed as a blockbuster series with a strong identity. Dom Peppiatt from GamesRadar wrote that Far Cry 3 and its expansion Blood Dragon helped cement Ubisoft's domination in the open-world first-person shooter genres and its position as both a developer and publisher. Many features from Far Cry 3, such as the presence of towers and wildlife hunting, were later used in other Ubisoft non-Far Cry games. Commenting on the Classic Edition, Alex Avard from GamesRadar+ described the game as a "formative game-changers" for Ubisoft, one that established the blueprint for open world game design for both future Ubisoft titles and other AAA games. In a more negative review, Kevin Fox Jr. from Paste Magazine wrote that the game was one of the most influential titles in the 2010s as its genre-mixing game design and its apolitical and unsophisticated approach to storytelling were apparent sources of inspiration for modern games. He ultimately described Far Cry 3 as "the increasingly safe, increasingly rent-seeking omni-genre—the do-everything, feel-nothing game".

Ubisoft initially planned to make a direct-narrative sequel to Far Cry 3, which involved the return of Jason as the game's protagonist and other supporting characters and the resurrection of Vaas. The plan was quickly abandoned in favour of an indirect sequel, Far Cry 4, set in the Himalayas region. Far Cry 4 was released on November 18, 2014, for Windows, PlayStation 3, PlayStation 4, Xbox 360 and Xbox One. It features a new cast of characters and a new location, the fictional South Asian country of Kyrat.
