= Gaming Masculinity =

2018 non-fiction book by Megan Condis

Gaming Masculinity: Trolls, Fake Geeks, and the Gendered Battle for Online Culture
- Author: Megan Condis
- Published: May 1, 2018
- Publisher: University of Iowa Press
- Publication place: United States
- Pages: 160
- ISBN: 9781609385651
- OCLC: 1007044262

Gaming Masculinity: Trolls, Fake Geeks, and the Gendered Battle for Online Culture is a non-fiction book by Megan Condis. Published in 2018 by the University of Iowa Press, the book discusses misogyny, Gamergate, and the impact of the alt-right in online gaming communities.

== Background ==
At the time of the book's publication, Megan Condis was an assistant professor of English at Stephen F. Austin State University. She based Gaming Masculinity off of her dissertation.

== Reception ==
Reception to the book was widely positive, with reviewers pointing to the book's broad overview and Condis's writing style as positives. A Critical Studies in Media Communication review described it as a good introductory text, while saying that more specialized books such as Ready Player Two (2017) by Shira Chess, Toxic Geek Masculinity in Media (2017) by Anastasia Salter, and This is Why We Can’t Have Nice Things: Mapping the Relationship between Online Trolling and Mainstream Culture (2015) by Whitney Phillips went more into detail. As an example of Condis's writing, the reviewer pointed to her use of "Game Breaks" (case studies), and stated that although they felt some were disjointed, they had allowed the author to go more into detail on certain topics than would have otherwise been permissible.

Several reviewers specifically noted that they felt Condis had done a good job in her book at avoiding generalizations, with The Times Literary Supplement, specifically saying that Condis was "careful to ensure that not all gamers are lumped together". CHOICE: Current Reviews for Academic Libraries disagreed, claiming that in attempting to tackle a subject so large, Condis had "perpetuate[d] the very binaries that she criticizes". Broadcaster Aleks Krotoski, whose work deals with online communities, felt that the book and the stories in it mirrored her own experiences covering the gaming industry. She also said that Gaming Masclulinity forsook covering "familiar territory of hyper-sexualized characters and plots" in favour of describing the "pervasive prejudices that create a hostile environment for anyone other than white, straight and relatively privileged men".
