= Child of Light =

2014 video game

- Developer: Ubisoft Montreal
- Publisher: Ubisoft
- Director: Patrick Plourde
- Producer: Jean-François Poirier
- Designers: Mélissa Cazzaro; Aurélie Débant
- Programmer: Brianna Code
- Artist: Thomas Rollus
- Writer: Jeffrey Yohalem
- Composer: Cœur de pirate
- Engine: UbiArt Framework
- Platforms: PlayStation 3; PlayStation 4; Wii U; Windows; Xbox 360; Xbox One; PlayStation Vita; Nintendo Switch; Google Stadia
- Release: PlayStation 3, PlayStation 4, Wii U, Windows, Xbox 360, Xbox One: WW: April 30, 2014; PlayStation Vita: AU: July 1, 2014; NA: July 1, 2014; EU: July 2, 2014; NA: March 24, 2015 (retail); Nintendo Switch: WW: October 11, 2018; Google Stadia: WW: October 19, 2021
- Genres: Platform, role-playing
- Modes: Single-player, multiplayer

Child of Light is a platforming role-playing video game developed by Ubisoft Montreal and published by Ubisoft for Windows, PlayStation 3, PlayStation 4, Wii U, Xbox 360 and Xbox One in April 2014, and was released on PlayStation Vita in July 2014. The game was later released on Nintendo Switch on 11 October 2018; the announcement of this release also teased a sequel that was later seemingly cancelled in the very early stages of development. It was also made available on Amazon Luna and Google Stadia in August and October 2021, respectively. The game is powered by the UbiArt Framework game engine.

The game's story takes place in the fictional land of Lemuria. Aurora, a child who wakes up in Lemuria after dying from a mysterious illness, must bring back the sun, the moon, and the stars that are all being held captive by the Queen of the Night in order to return home.

The game received mainly positive reviews, with particular praise for its visuals, presentation, gameplay, soundtrack and story.

== Gameplay ==
Child of Light's gameplay has the attributes of a side-scroller with role-playing elements such as leveling up to increase stats over time. Battles with enemies use a system of turn-based combat similar to the active-time battle system found in games of the Final Fantasy and the Grandia series. The player can control up to two characters during battle, and swap these two with waiting characters. Up to three enemies can appear during battle. If the player approaches an enemy from behind, the battle becomes a "Surprise Strike", giving the player an advantage. If the enemy approaches the player from behind, it becomes an "Ambush", giving the enemy an advantage. The character Igniculus, a playable firefly, is used as an in-game mechanic outside of and during battle. The player can freely move Igniculus to open chests that Aurora cannot reach, as well as shine his light on an enemy to slow it down or on an ally to heal them.

== Synopsis ==
=== Setting and characters ===
Child of Light takes place on the kingdom of Lemuria, which is located in an alternate world and encompasses a peninsular continent. To the northeast is Greater Lemuria, a land filled with ancient ruins and massive trees, as well as floating islands that are home to the elfin Aerostati race. West of the Mahthildis Forest in central Lemuria is a village home to the dwarf-like, magic-using Capilli. Further west near the Plains of Rambert lies the town of Bolmus Populi, which rests upon the back of a benevolent stone giant and is home to the eponymous Populi, a race of anthropomorphic trader mice. Near the Cynbel Sea southwest of Lemuria is the Flooded Lands, where the fish-like Pisceans dwell. Other races include the warlike Kategida, who are tasked with the protection of Lemuria.

Prior to the game's events, the continent of Lemuria was discovered by four explorers, who then proceeded to colonize it. For many ages Lemuria was ruled by the Queen of Light until one night when she mysteriously vanished. From the darkness rose Umbra, Queen of the Night, who stole the sun, the stars, and the moon, thus robbing Lemuria of its light before conquering it. By the game's beginning the land's inhabitants live in fear of Umbra, who rules with an iron fist.

The main playable characters are Aurora, a princess who strives to find a way home after being stranded in Lemuria; Rubella, an Aerostati jester with a slight vocabulary problem who is searching for her brother Tristis; Finn, a young, timid Capilli sorcerer whose village is beset by a curse cast by Umbra; Norah, Aurora's stepsister, who was pulled through the mirror to Lemuria; Robert, a Populi trader skilled in archery; and Rubella's also jester brother Tristis. They are later joined by Óengus, a Kategida who was exiled when he pledged himself to Umbra in exchange for her sparing his clan's lives, and Genovefa, a young Piscean sorceress and one of the remaining survivors of her village. Other characters include Igniculus, a firefly who becomes Aurora's companion; the Queen of Light, the former ruler of Lemuria; the Duke, Aurora's father, and main antagonist Umbra, Queen of the Night, along with her daughters Nox and Crepusculum.

=== Plot ===
In Austria, (Note: The game's writer, Jeffrey Yohalem, has stated that the specific Austrian location is the duchy of Carniola—see § Development for more information.) a princess named Aurora is born to a Duke, who rules over a kingdom of five hills, and his beautiful, yet mysterious wife. Following the apparent death of Aurora's mother, her father eventually remarries. On Good Friday, 1895, Aurora seemingly dies in her sleep, causing the Duke to become bedridden, overcome with despair.

Aurora subsequently awakens on an altar in the land of Lemuria. Guided by Igniculus, she finds a sword that she uses to arm herself, and a chamber where the Lady of the Forest is imprisoned. Upon freeing the Lady, Aurora is told that her own world and Lemuria are connected by a mirror that was stolen by Umbra. To be able to use the mirror to go home, Aurora must recover Lemuria's light. The Lady gives Aurora advice of how to do this, a flute, and the stars which she had, granting Aurora the ability to fly.

Along Aurora's quest, she is joined by jester Rubella, dwarf wizard Finn, her step-sister Norah, mouse archer Robert, and Rubella's jester brother Tristis. She learns through a series of visions that her father's health is declining and a nearby dam has burst, flooding the area. The people of his kingdom seek his leadership to resolve the crisis, but his combined despair and failing health render him unable to guide them.

The party eventually locates the mirror back to Aurora's world at the Temple of the Moon. Upon crossing, Aurora is confronted by her stepmother and stepsister Cordelia. Norah reveals that she led Aurora into a trap; her mother and Aurora's stepmother is in fact Umbra herself, and Norah and Cordelia are Nox and Crepusculum, the daughters Umbra sent to steal Lemuria's sun and moon. Aurora further learns that Umbra's arch-enemy, the Queen of Light, is in fact Aurora's mother. Umbra attempts to kill Aurora, but Aurora's false crown—a gift from her father—shields her from Umbra's power. Aurora is thrown into prison and left to die.

While imprisoned, Aurora has a vision of her mother, who is revealed to have been responsible for Aurora's transporting to Lemuria in order to protect her from Umbra. Upon awakening she is joined by Óengus, and the two free the party. However, upon leaving the tower they are confronted by Crepusculum; Aurora defeats her and retrieves the moon, causing her to change from a child into a grown woman. She and her friends head to the Cynbel Sea seeking the sun, where they are joined by Genovefa.

After making her way through the Palace of the Sun, Aurora confronts and defeats Nox, regaining the sun. Umbra promptly arrives, enraged at the death of her daughters, but offers Aurora the chance to reunite with her father in exchange for the moon and the stars. Unable to abandon the Lemurians to their fate, Aurora reluctantly tells her father through the portal that she cannot return to him, leading to his death. With the Duke dead, the fake crown protecting Aurora disappears, leaving her vulnerable to Umbra's magic. Severely injured from the attacks, Aurora crawls her way to escape with the sun.

Igniculus and his firefly friends carry Aurora to the altar where she first woke in Lemuria. Beside the altar is the Lady of the Forest, who reveals herself to be the Queen of Light. She revives Aurora with the aid of all the Lemurians Aurora helped throughout her journey. With Aurora's renewed powers, she quickly flies the party up into the sky to Umbra's castle, and together they defeat Umbra.

Through one last vision, Aurora learns that the flood is worsening. With the help of all of her Lemurian friends, she goes through the mirror to her world, arriving on Easter Sunday, and rescues all of the people of the Duke's kingdom from the flood by leading them back through the mirror to Lemuria.

== Development ==
Initially revealed at GDC Europe 2013 by creative director Patrick Plourde, Child of Light is said to be inspired by Studio Ghibli and Yoshitaka Amano in its art style, and in presentation similar to games like Vagrant Story, Final Fantasy VIII and Limbo. During development, the writer was Jeffrey Yohalem. The lead programmer was Brie Code. The game is narrated by Canadian actress Caroline Dhavernas.

=== Narrative ===
During development, the character of Aurora was going to grow physically throughout the game, aging from 5 to 10, to 15, and to finish around 20 years old; this plot device was likened to an evolution of the character in how her relationships with others and her perspective on life changed, and would mirror the gameplay's RPG mechanics, starting off weak and leveling up. The game would also have had multiple endings, where "the player [would] decide what ending they want". Ultimately, Aurora only ages physically once in the game and there is just one ending. Plourde and Yohalem also discussed the concept of a Prince Charming in the narrative, and how they wanted Aurora to be someone who did not rely on a man or fall in love at the end of the story. Yohalem particularly expressed how love is an "easy way out" for a writer. The narrative instead focuses on growing up in the modern world, sacrificing time to help others, becoming an adult, and how one does that by themselves.

A final level based in the sky and set after defeating Nox but before fighting Umbra was originally planned but did not make it into the final version of the game; the level revolved entirely around gameplay and no story was removed.

Though not explicitly stated in-game, Aurora's duchy in Austria is located in Carniola. An earthquake that hit the capital of Carniola on Easter Sunday in 1895 is adapted into the game's story, where it causes a nearby dam to burst and the capital to be flooded. Similarly, the land of Lemuria that the player explores throughout the game is based on a supposedly lost continent.

=== Presentation ===
The game was designed using the UbiArt Framework engine, which had previously been used to design Rayman Origins and Rayman Legends. The engine allowed the design team to input concept art directly into the game, giving the game the look of an animated painting and the feel of progressing in an illustration. The team focused on creating a watercolor effect to give the impression of "being awake in an underwater dream". After some of the staff had their children successfully draw Aurora based on the brief description of her being a princess with long red hair and an oversized crown, they knew they had created an iconic character.

Child of Light takes inspiration from many poems, with Plourde describing it as "a playable poem"; the majority of the game's dialogue is portrayed through rhyme delivered in ballad form, in which each four-line stanza sees the second and fourth lines end with rhyming words. Variable iambic syllable counts were used for flexibility, with Yohalem explaining its use to justify varying line lengths and word pairings that don't always perfectly match up. Collectibles in the game called Confessions—secret letters that the player can find floating in the wind and pick up—are delivered in the form of sonnets. Yohalem believes the most difficult challenge he faced while writing for the game was keeping each character's voice distinct from one another despite them sharing the same cadence while rhyming. Yohalem attributes the fairy tale culture of the game to The Rime of the Ancient Mariner and also looked to using Sleeping Beauty as a thematic element.

Plourde states that the art was inspired by illustrators such as Arthur Rackham, John Bauer, and Edmund Dulac, as well as the art of Yoshitaka Amano, with whom they partnered in designing some of the characters and in the production of a Child of Light painting. The painting was distributed as a European-exclusive poster that came with the deluxe editions of the game on Windows, PlayStation 3, and PlayStation 4.

Ubisoft also partnered with Cirque du Soleil during the development of the game, who helped provide the game's theatrical feel and costume design.

=== Music ===
The original soundtrack has 18 tracks and was composed by Béatrice Martin, also known under her stage pseudonym Cœur de pirate, a Canadian singer and songwriter from the province of Québec, with her additionally providing vocals for "Off to Sleep", the credits theme. Martin worked with the Montreal-based Bratislava Symphony Orchestra in recording some of the songs. Plourde described her music as "fresh, romantic and optimistic", elements he wanted to express with Child of Light.

== Reception ==
Reception

Aggregate score
Aggregator	Score
Metacritic	PC: 77/100; PS3: 89/100; PS4: 82/100; WIIU: 84/100; X360: 74/100; XONE: 82/100; VITA: 83/100; NS: 84/100

Review scores
Publication	Score
Destructoid	8.5/10
Game Informer	8/10
GameSpot	8/10
GameZone	9.5/10
Giant Bomb	3/5
IGN	9.3/10

Child of Light received positive reviews from critics. Review aggregator website Metacritic gave the PlayStation 3 version 89/100, the Switch version 84/100, the Wii U version 84/100, the PlayStation 4 version 82/100, the Xbox One version 82/100, the Xbox 360 version 74/100, and the PC version 77/100.

Vince Ingenito of IGN lauded the art style and character designs, finding them elegant and complementary to "a combat system that's second to none". Slight criticism was reserved for the dialogue – though he found it endearing, Ingenito believed the "slightly forced" rhyming scheme kept him from getting fully absorbed in the characters. Ingenito ultimately wrote that each facet of its gameplay served to express the developer's intent, rather than to appeal to a broad audience.

Chris Carter of Destructoid similarly praised the aesthetics, from the environments to the "slick" and consistent presentation of the dialogue, but felt that the narrative, while well-paced, didn't exceed his expectations. Carter also appreciated the mechanic of controlling Igniculus to slow enemies during combat, solve puzzles, and refill health and magic via orbs, but criticised the general lack of challenge and the rudimentary character upgrade paths.

GameZone's Matt Liebl also enjoyed the "whimsical feel" of Child of Light achieved through a combination of visuals, rhyming scheme, and Cœur de pirate's piano score. Liebl, as with Carter, praised the ability to control Igniculus during combat for added depth, and also noted the lack of character customisation. Unlike Carter, however, Liebl felt that underneath the visuals was a "thought-provoking" story and, in comparing the game with contemporary Ubisoft blockbuster releases such as Watch Dogs and the Assassin's Creed franchise, affirmed that Child of Light is "the type of game this industry needs".

Tom McShea of GameSpot further opined that the environments instilled a sense of sadness and felt that the story was "about fear and betrayal, hopelessness and fortitude". He stated that this sombre tone was well contrasted by the frenetic combat system. Unlike other reviewers, Mc Shea believed the challenge of these battles to be perfectly balanced. He echoed the closing statements of Liebl in that he was happy that such a game exists in the industry. In returning to review the game for the Nintendo Switch more than four years later, GameSpot reiterated that the game was an equally strong experience.

Giant Bomb's Alex Navarro was more critical of the game; he felt that the visual splendor of the game did not leave a lasting impact and thought the narrative uninspired due to its over-reliance on childhood storybook motifs, such as magical kingdoms, evil stepmothers, and rhyming dialogue – the latter of which Navarro particularly struggled with as it clashed with his ability to understand the plot. Considering his agreement with Destructoid's Chris Carter over a perceived lack of difficulty – at least for the early game – Navarro believed that the game's appeal was thus superficial until towards the end of the game where it was strengthened by "a stronger, more thoughtful, more engaging experience".

During the 18th Annual D.I.C.E. Awards, the Academy of Interactive Arts & Sciences nominated Child of Light for "Handheld Game of the Year".

== Related media ==
On April 30, 2015, Ubisoft released a free digital book titled Child of Light: Reginald the Great to celebrate the game's first anniversary. Written by the game's writer Jeffrey Yohalem, the story of the book revolves around Reginald and his adventures in Lemuria two years after Child of Light.

At the time of the book's release in 2015, illustrator Serge Meirinho stated that he was currently involved in a new book set in the Child of Light universe, and creative director Patrick Plourde explained that they had two books already written and a third planned, though no further books were released.

Announced in October 2018, screenwriter Tasha Huo is writing a pilot for a television adaptation of Child of Light; in an interview with Variety, Huo stated that she was "a longtime fan of the game" and wanted to capture the theme of a strong female heroine in a fairy tale world in a live-action show.

On March 31, 2022, Aurora was added as a playable character as a free update to the video game Bloodstained: Ritual of the Night.

=== Sequel ===
In 2015, Plourde stated that more projects set in the Child of Light universe were under development; he had previously said the game was profitable enough to fund a sequel. Ubisoft were reportedly "super happy" with the success of Child of Light, and as a result established the developers of the game as a core team at Ubisoft Montreal.

The announcement of the game's upcoming release on the Nintendo Switch in late 2018 also teased a sequel, titled Child of Light II. Prior to the release of Child of Light, Plourde remarked on how it could be interesting to look at falling in love "at another time" and commented on possibly returning to the character of Aurora. In an "AMA" (Ask Me Anything) conducted on Reddit following the release of the game, writer Jeffrey Yohalem expressed interest in a sequel, hinting that the contents of the collectible Confessions seen in Child of Light could play a central role.

In a later interview in 2019, Plourde clarified that the teased document summarized a prequel; it would feature multiple protagonists and thematically explore love, friendship, motivations, and detachment – taking inspiration from the ballet Swan Lake. Visually, the game would retain its watercolor-inspired art. The gameplay would be "more operatic" and "slightly more adult". Plourde expressed that he was unsure if it was still in development but said that he was not involved and that it was unlikely, with most of the core team responsible for the original game having departed the company. With a focus on games as a service, Plourde expressed doubt over the prequel, believing games such as Child of Light to be no longer something that Ubisoft would want to make.
