= Ubisoft Montreal =

Canadian video game developer

Ubisoft Divertissements Inc.

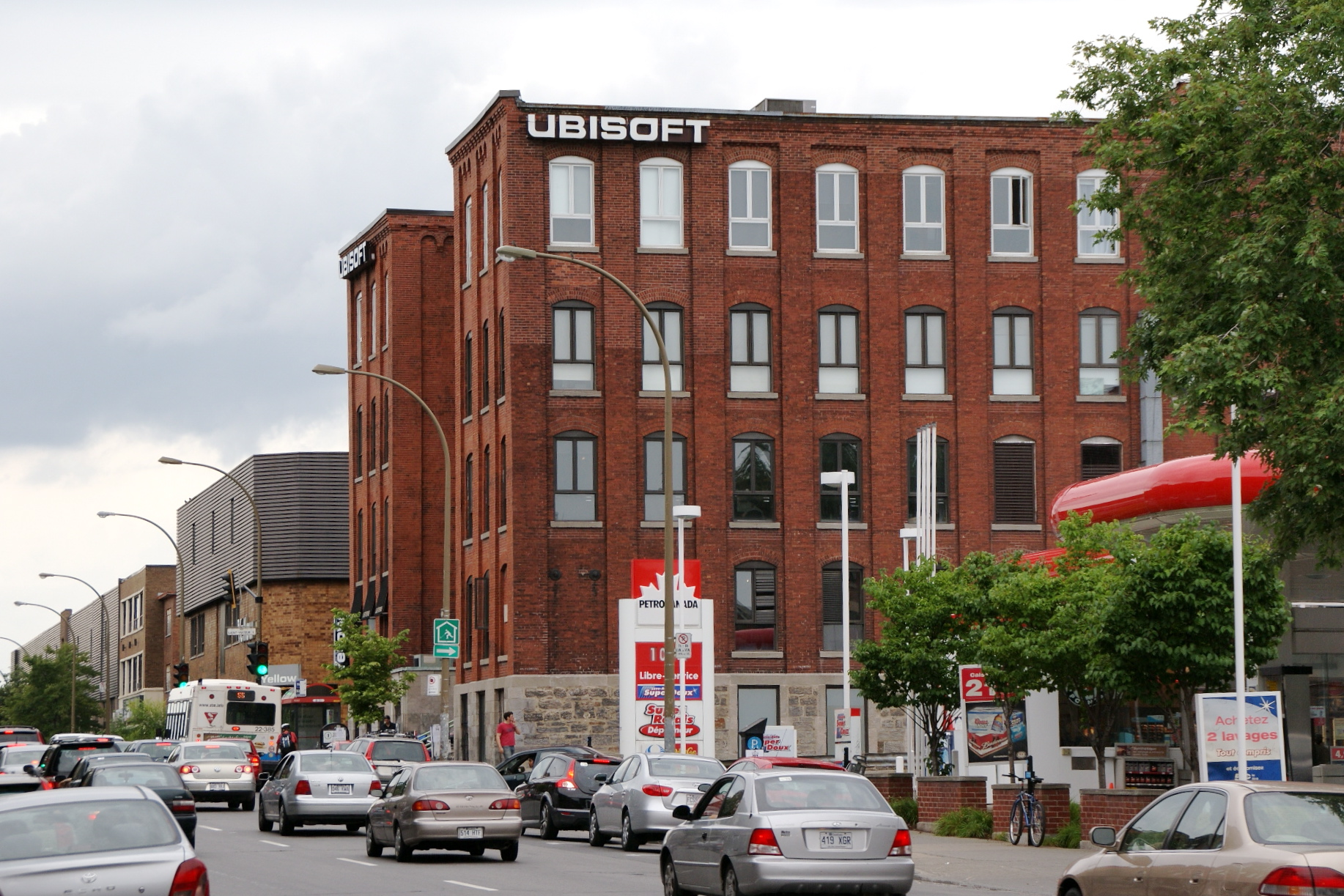
- Headquarters in the Peck Building
- Trade name: Ubisoft Montreal
- Formerly: Ubi Soft Montreal (1997–2003) (Note: The former "Ubi Soft" name was changed across all of its divisions to "Ubisoft" on 9 September 2003 as part of a rebranding strategy.)
- Type: Subsidiary
- Industry: Video games
- Founded: 25 April 1997; 29 years ago
- Headquarters: Montreal, Canada
- Number of employees: 4,000+ (2023)
- Parent: Ubisoft
- Website: montreal.ubisoft.com

Ubisoft Divertissements Inc., doing business as Ubisoft Montreal, is a Canadian video game developer and a studio of Ubisoft based in Montreal.

The studio was founded in April 1997 as part of Ubisoft's growth into worldwide markets, with subsidies from the governments of Montreal, Quebec, and Canada to help create new multimedia jobs. The studio's initial products were low-profile children's games based on existing intellectual property. Ubisoft Montreal's break-out titles were 2002's Tom Clancy's Splinter Cell and 2003's Prince of Persia: The Sands of Time. Subsequently, the studio continued to develop sequels and related games in both series, and developing its own intellectual properties such as Assassin's Creed, Far Cry, Watch Dogs, and For Honor.

By October 2022, the studio employed over 4,000 staff, making it the largest in the world. The studio helped to establish Montreal as a creative city, and brought other video game developers and publishers to establish studios there.

== History ==
=== Background and foundation (1997–2001) ===
Following Ubisoft's initial public offering in 1996, the Montreuil, France-based publisher began looking to expand into more global markets. Establishing a studio in Quebec was of strong interest to the company; according to Ubisoft Montreal's CEO Yannis Mallat, a Quebec studio would allow it to bring in French-speaking employees and help with communication with the Montreuil headquarters, and was in close proximity to the United States, one of the largest markets for video games.

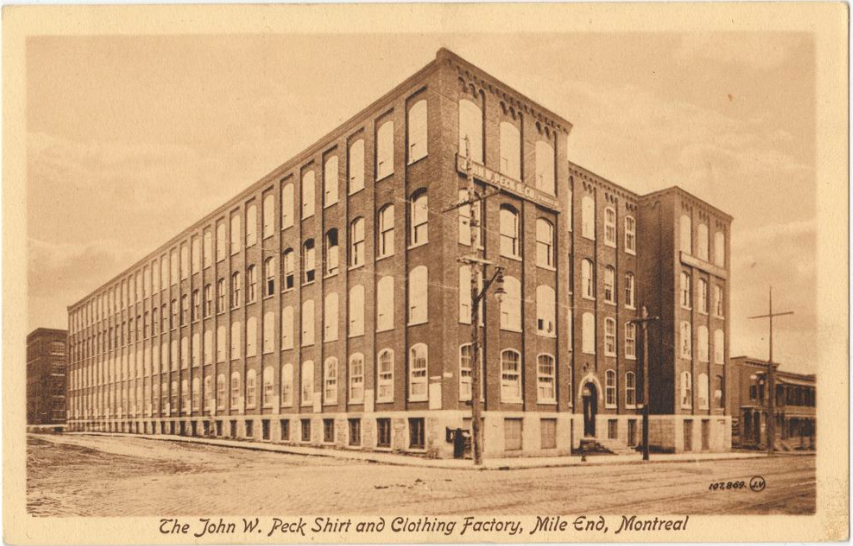
The Peck Building, formerly housing the John W. Peck Shirt and Clothing Factory, became Ubisoft Montreal's headquarters in 1997 (1910).

At the same time, the city of Montreal in Quebec was looking to recover from job losses due to disappearing manufacturing and textile industries from the early 1990s. The controlling political party, Parti Québécois (PQ), pursued new job creation in technology, computers, and multimedia. Lobbyist Sylvain Vaugeois, hearing that Ubisoft was searching for jobs, came up with a plan called Plan Mercure which would incentivize Ubisoft to found a studio in Montreal by having the government subsidize each employee CA$25,000 for five years, but the government rejected this plan, believing it was too expensive for use of public funds. Vaugeois still went on to meet with Ubisoft, inviting it to visit Montreal and suggesting Plan Mercure was viable, and upon its visit, discovered that it had been misled, leading to some embarrassment on the city and province. PQ representatives of Quebec's and Montreal's government met with Ubisoft to convince it to establish a studio in Quebec after hearing that Ubisoft was considering a studio instead near Boston or in New Brunswick, and recognized they needed to follow on some form of Vaugeois' Plan Mercure to convince Ubisoft to form a studio in Montreal. Pierre Pettigrew, the Minister of Human Resources Development worked with the Quebec and federal government to come to a solution, whereby the two governments would split the previously considered CA$25,000 per employee (CA$15,000 from the Quebec government) to provide 500 new jobs to young persons and provide training in the multimedia sector. Ubisoft was agreeable to this, and established Ubisoft Montreal (formally named Ubisoft Divertissements Inc.) on 25 April 1997. The studio was founded in offices in the Peck Building, a former textile factory, located in the Mile End neighbourhood along Saint-Laurent Boulevard.

Martin Tremblay joined the studio as executive vice-president in 1999, and was promoted to chief operating officer a year later.

The studio began with 50 employees, with half having coming from Ubisoft's Montreuil headquarters, and the other hired in under the government subsidies. According to Mallet, a founding myth of the company was that they had thrown the new employees in a room with computers and were told to develop a game, but Mallet did acknowledge that there was a lack of experience in game development from this group. Initially, the studio developed children's games based on licensed intellectual property (IP) such as Donald Duck: Goin' Quackers and games based on the Playmobil series of toys. While these were not critically significant games, they sold well to keep the studio profitable, and allowed it to establish an internal program for creating its own IP.

=== IP establishment and growth (2002–2008) ===
Ubisoft Montreal's break-out title came through Tom Clancy's Splinter Cell, released in 2002. Prior to this, Ubisoft had closed down an internal development studio at the New York offices in 1999, which had been working on a game called The Drift, a third-person shooter with elements of stealth. Ubisoft had found the game lacking cohesion, and despite efforts to rebrand it as a potential James Bond game, Ubisoft opted to halt development and transfer key staff and all the work in progress to Ubisoft Montreal. The next year in 2000, Ubisoft acquired Red Storm Entertainment, which had successfully produced games based on Tom Clancy novels. The acquisition included the licence to develop more Tom Clancy-based games, as well as access to the Unreal game engine. The Ubisoft Montreal team started experimenting with modern spy gadgetry within the existing Drift elements, and found some potential promise to make a game in the Tom Clancy's series from it. With Metal Gear Solid 2: Sons of Liberty soon to be released, Ubisoft Montreal was tasked with creating the Metal Gear Solid killer, which resulted in the first Splinter Cell game. The Montreal studio continued to develop several of the Splinter Cell sequels through 2010.

In 2001, Ubisoft acquired the rights to the Myst, Chessmaster, and Prince of Persia IPs from Mattel and The Learning Company. Mattel was adamant about getting the Prince of Persia series and assured that the Montreal studio got the first chance to work with it. Ubisoft Montreal took the original 2D platforming games into a third-person 3D perspective, incorporating parkour, as well as bringing the series' original creator Jordan Mechner as a consultant for the game's story. Prince of Persia: The Sands of Time was released in 2003, and proved a critical and financial success, with over 14 million copies sold by 2014, as well as several sequels.

A small team in Ubisoft Montreal worked on developing a Prince of Persia for the next-generation consoles starting in 2004. They wanted to break away from having the player-character as a prince, and soon came to the concept of having the player control one of the Assassins in protecting the prince during the period of the Third Crusade. The newer hardware allowed them to expand the linear gameplay from Prince of Persia: The Sands of Time into an open world. Ubisoft was not keen on releasing a title in the Prince of Persia series where the Prince was not the prime character, and the title was reworked to be a new IP, called Assassin's Creed that ended up being released in 2007, selling over 10 million units by 2014. This was the third major IP being developed at Ubisoft Montreal, and has also had numerous sequels since its release.

Yet another major IP came to Ubisoft Montreal was the Far Cry series. Ubisoft had initially contracted with Crytek to expand their demonstration of their CryEngine into a full game named Far Cry, which Ubisoft published in 2004. After its release, Crytek was approached by Electronic Arts to develop exclusively for them. Ubisoft established a deal with Crytek for the rights to Far Cry and a persistent licence to the CryEngine. Ubisoft assigned Ubisoft Montreal to develop console releases of Far Cry, which allowed them to continue to work with the licence and improve upon the CryEngine, making a new proprietary engine called the Dunia engine. The Montreal team created several sequels to Far Cry, starting with Far Cry 2 released in 2008.

During this period, in 2005, the government of Quebec gave Ubisoft CA$5 million to expand with anticipation of reaching 2,000 employees by 2010. In 2007, with already 1,600 employees, the government increased to CA$19 million to reach 3,000 employees by 2013, which would make Ubisoft Montreal the world's largest game development studio.

During his time as COO, Martin Tremblay was a staunch supporter of non-compete clauses, in large part due to an incident in which Electronic Arts hired away several Ubisoft Montreal employees to the at the time newly opened EA Montreal studio. When Tremblay left Ubisoft in 2006 to become President of Worldwide Studios at Vivendi Games, he was prevented from taking the new position by a court order enforcing the non-compete clause in his Ubisoft contract. Upon Tremblay's departure in 2006, Yannis Mallat, a producer on the Prince of Persia games, became the new CEO, also filling the same roles as Tremblay's COO position.

=== Ongoing development (2009–current) ===
Ubisoft Montreal continue to develop games in the Tom Clancy's, Prince of Persia, Assassin's Creed, and Far Cry series, with various Ubisoft studios assisting at times. These series established Ubisoft Montreal's approach around open world games, a goal that Ubisoft wanted as the publisher prepared for the eighth generation of consoles, as well as dedication to the authenticity and historical accuracy of its products. To continue to expand its portfolio, Ubisoft Montreal subsequently developed the Watch Dogs series, with the first game released in 2014. Watch Dogs was developed as a modern, urban open world game, but to differentiate itself from Grand Theft Auto, incorporated elements of hacking and surveillance.

In 2013 Ubisoft acquired THQ Montreal and merged it into Ubisoft Montreal.

Ubisoft Montreal developed another new IP, For Honor, which was first released in 2017. Atypical of Ubisoft Montreal's properties, For Honor is a multiplayer action combat game that uses various warriors from across various time periods. It had been an idea that its lead developer Jason Vandenberghe had had for at least ten years prior to its announcement. For Honor represents the studio's first attempt at an "ongoing game", producing ongoing content released on a seasonal basis.

In June and July 2020, as part of a larger wave of accusations of sexual misconduct through the video game industry as part of the #MeToo movement, several high-profile people within Ubisoft as a whole were also accused of misconduct. As part of a number of voluntary regulations following internal investigations, Ubisoft Montreal's CEO and managing director for Ubisoft's Canadian studios Yannis Mallat also stepped down and left the company on July 11, 2020. Christophe Derennes was named to replace Mallat.

Ubisoft Montreal ventured into mobile game development, announcing Tom Clancy's Rainbow Six Mobile on April 5, 2022, for Android and iOS. The title is the mobile-adapted version of the studio's 2015 tactical shooter Tom Clancy's Rainbow Six Siege. As of 2023, the studio employs more than 4,000 people.

In 2025, the studio released Assassin's Creed Shadows and is currently developing several titles, including Assassin's Creed Hexe.

== Games developed ==
Ubisoft Montreal is the principal developer for games in the Assassin's Creed, Prince of Persia, Far Cry, Tom Clancy's Splinter Cell, Tom Clancy's Rainbow Six, and Watch Dogs series, among other titles. However, this does not mean that it develops all the titles in these franchises, and more often than not, other Ubisoft studios support them with development.

- Tom Clancy's Splinter Cell series (2002–2010)
- Prince of Persia series (2003–2010)
- Tom Clancy's Rainbow Six series (2003–present)
- Far Cry series (2005–2019)
- Assassin's Creed series (2007–present)
- Watch Dogs series (2014–2016)
- Child of Light (2014)
- For Honor (2017)
- Transference (2018)
- Roller Champions (2022)

== Impact ==
The establishment of Ubisoft Montreal is considered to have a significant impact on Montreal. The Mile End area over the subsequent years transformed from a low-rent area to a commercial hub with new businesses, stores, restaurants and other attractions for the young workforce. For the city overall, Ubisoft Montreal was the first major video game studio and helped to establish its position as a creative city. Several other publishers, including Electronic Arts, Eidos Interactive, THQ, and Warner Bros., established studios in Montreal following Ubisoft, with the Quebec and federal governments continuing to offer subsidy programs to support high-tech job creation. In exchange, the studio has spent up to CA$3.5 billion in the province of Quebec, and with its parent publisher, helped to open Ubisoft Quebec in Quebec City in 2005 and Ubisoft Saguenay in Saguenay in 2018 to help support Ubisoft Montreal's efforts, using similar tax incentives from the province to help found these.
