= Darby McDevitt =

American game developer and writer (born 1975)

- Occupations: Game Designer, Writer
- Years active: 1999–present

Darby McDevitt is a game developer and writer, best known for his work on the Assassin's Creed series.

McDevitt has worked as a writer, film maker, musician, and game designer. As an employee of Ubisoft, McDevitt has been the script writer for both the story and dialogue in Assassin's Creed: Bloodlines, Assassin's Creed II: Discovery, Assassin's Creed: Embers and Assassin's Creed Unity, as well as was the lead writer for Assassin's Creed: Revelations and Assassin's Creed IV: Black Flag. In 2014, McDevitt was nominated for a Writers Guild of America Award for his work on Black Flag. He is also recognized as a spokesperson for Ubisoft in regards to the Assassin's Creed franchise.

In March 2021, McDevitt left Ubisoft, but returned in November.

== Games ==
=== Upcoming ===
- Assassin's Creed: Codename Hexe

=== Narrative Director ===
- Assassin's Creed Valhalla

=== Writer ===
- Assassin's Creed Valhalla (Narrative director)
- Assassin's Creed Unity (co-writer)
- Assassin's Creed IV: Black Flag
- Assassin's Creed Black Flag Resynced
- Assassin's Creed: Revelations
- Assassin's Creed II: Discovery
- Assassin's Creed: Bloodlines
- The Sims 2 DS
- The Chronicles of Narnia: The Lion, the Witch and the Wardrobe
- The Urbz: Sims in the City
- Lord of the Rings: The Third Age
- The Sims Bustin' Out

=== Writer and designer ===
- Where the Wild Things Are
- Lord of the Rings: The Two Towers GBA

=== Producer and writer ===
- ClueFinders: The Incredible Toy Store Adventure!

== Other notable works ==
Music Videos:

- "Threes" by Autographic
- "Change" by Sneaky Thieves
- "When I Die" by Sneaky Thieves
- "Quarry" by Sneaky Thieves
- "Lesser" by Sneaky Thieves
- "Brotherly" album medley by Sneaky Thieves

Narrative and Documentary Films:

- "Recital" (Short)
- "Proscenium" (Short)
- "Day Fable" (Short)
- "The Making of Cowards Bend The Knee" (Documentary Featurette )

Music:

Sneaky Thieves

- "Brotherly" 2010 Other Electricites
- "Accidents" 2007 Other Electricites

Autographic

- "Technoir Classics" 2012
- "The Attic" 2009

== Awards and nominations ==
Year	Award	Award category	Title of Work	Result
2012	Writers Guild of America Award	Achievement in Videogame Writing	Assassin's Creed: Revelations	Nominated
2012	Canadian Game Awards	Best Writing	Assassin's Creed: Revelations	Nominated
2013	Canadian Game Awards	Best Writing	Assassin's Creed IV: Black Flag	Won
2014	Writers Guild of America Award	Achievement in Videogame Writing	Assassin's Creed IV: Black Flag	Nominated
2021	BAFTA Games Awards	Best Narrative	Assassin's Creed: Valhalla	Nominated
2021	Canadian Game Awards	Best Narrative	Assassin's Creed: Valhalla	Won
