= Assassin's Creed Shadows =

2025 video game

- Developer: Ubisoft Quebec (Note: Additional work by Ubisoft Belgrade, Ubisoft Bordeaux, Ubisoft Bucharest, Ubisoft Chengdu, Ubisoft Kyiv, Ubisoft Milan, Ubisoft Montpellier, Ubisoft Montreal, Ubisoft Odesa, Ubisoft Osaka, Ubisoft Pune, Ubisoft Shanghai, Ubisoft Singapore, Ubisoft Sofia, and Ubisoft Tokyo)
- Publisher: Ubisoft
- Directors: Jonathan Dumont; Charles Benoit
- Producer: Karl Onnée
- Artist: Thierry Dansereau
- Writer: Ryan Galletta
- Composers: The Flight; TEKE::TEKE
- Series: Assassin's Creed
- Engine: Ubisoft Anvil
- Platforms: macOS; PlayStation 5; Windows; Xbox Series X/S; Nintendo Switch 2; iPadOS
- Release: macOS, PS5, Win, XSX/S; March 20, 2025; Switch 2; December 2, 2025; iPadOS; TBA
- Genre: Action role-playing
- Mode: Single-player

Assassin's Creed Shadows is a 2025 action role-playing game developed by Ubisoft Quebec and published by Ubisoft. It is the fourteenth main installment in the Assassin's Creed series and the successor to Assassin's Creed Mirage (2023). Set in 16th-century Japan towards the end of the Sengoku period, the game focuses on the millennia-old struggle between the Assassin Brotherhood, who fight for peace and liberty, and the Templar Order, who desire peace through control, from the perspective of two protagonists: Fujibayashi Naoe, a kunoichi (a female shinobi), and Yasuke, an African (Note: The game states that Yasuke was originally from Mozambique, brought to Japan with the Jesuit missionaries.) samurai inspired by the historical figure of the same name. Initially starting out as adversaries, the two protagonists join forces to investigate and dismantle a shadow group that is destabilizing Japan, while uncovering mysteries related to both the Assassins and Templars.

Development of Shadows began in 2020, following the release of Assassin's Creed Valhalla. The game was first revealed in September 2022, under the working title Assassin's Creed: Codename Red, followed by an official announcement in May 2024, which included a cinematic trailer and the first details about its story and gameplay. Continuing to build upon the role-playing elements of previous installments, Shadows features a large open world based on Japan's Kansai region, where players can focus on either advancing the main narrative or completing a variety of side activities. Emphasis is placed on each playable character's unique strengths and weaknesses, with players having the option to switch between Naoe and Yasuke at will and significantly alter the way they approach missions.

Following its initial announcement, Shadows garnered criticism online due to the decision to feature a fictionalized version of Yasuke as one of the game's main characters. This led to a wave of backlash and controversy that lasted until the game's launch. After several delays, the game was released for Windows, macOS, PlayStation 5, and Xbox Series X/S on March 20, 2025; a version for the Nintendo Switch 2 was released on December 2, 2025, while a port for iPadOS is also planned for a later date. Upon release, Shadows received generally positive reviews from critics.

== Gameplay ==
Assassin's Creed Shadows is an action role-playing game with an emphasis on each of its two playable characters' set of unique skills. It is developed on an upgraded version of Anvil, using dynamic lighting and environmental interactions. Improvements include the addition of breakable objects and the ability to manipulate shadows and use a grappling hook for parkour. The game's open world, whose size is comparable to that of Assassin's Creed Origins, progresses through seasons which can affect gameplay (for example, ponds and shallow bodies of water in which Naoe can submerge herself and hide in, are frozen over in winter). Missions are non-linear, encouraging players to track and eliminate targets freely; in a change from previous games, vantage points exist to help the player look for points of interest, not to mark objectives. By default, Assassin's Creed Shadows does not reveal the exact locations of targets or key NPCs, and the player must recruit and deploy scouts to narrow down their exact location based on clues given.

New gameplay features include the ability to go prone and crawl along the ground, helping the player avoid detection and pass through small openings. The character can venture into shallow water, breathing through a bamboo stick. Traditional 'Eagle Vision' also makes a comeback for Naoe, allowing her to determine the locations of enemies and useful gameplay elements. Both Naoe and Yasuke can enter a new mode called "Observe", a fast and easy way of gathering information about targets. This mode is also available while crouching on high vantage points, enabling players to closely examine newly discovered places. Hiding in shadows makes Naoe invisible to her enemies, both indoors and outdoors, so players may choose to destroy lit lanterns with shurikens. Moving while crouching enables the player to move silently across creaking nightingale floors.

Players can switch between characters as they progress through missions. A diverse selection of historically accurate weapons is available, from katanas and the kanabō war club, to polearms such as the naginata, thrown weapons such as shurikens and kunai, ranged weapons such as the yumi bow and teppo matchlock rifle, and the kusarigama. Each weapon comes with its own skill tree, enabling players to improve their proficiency. Both characters have distinctly different playstyles. Players can choose to take a stealthy, agile approach as Naoe, or charge headlong into combat as Yasuke.

== Synopsis ==
=== Setting ===
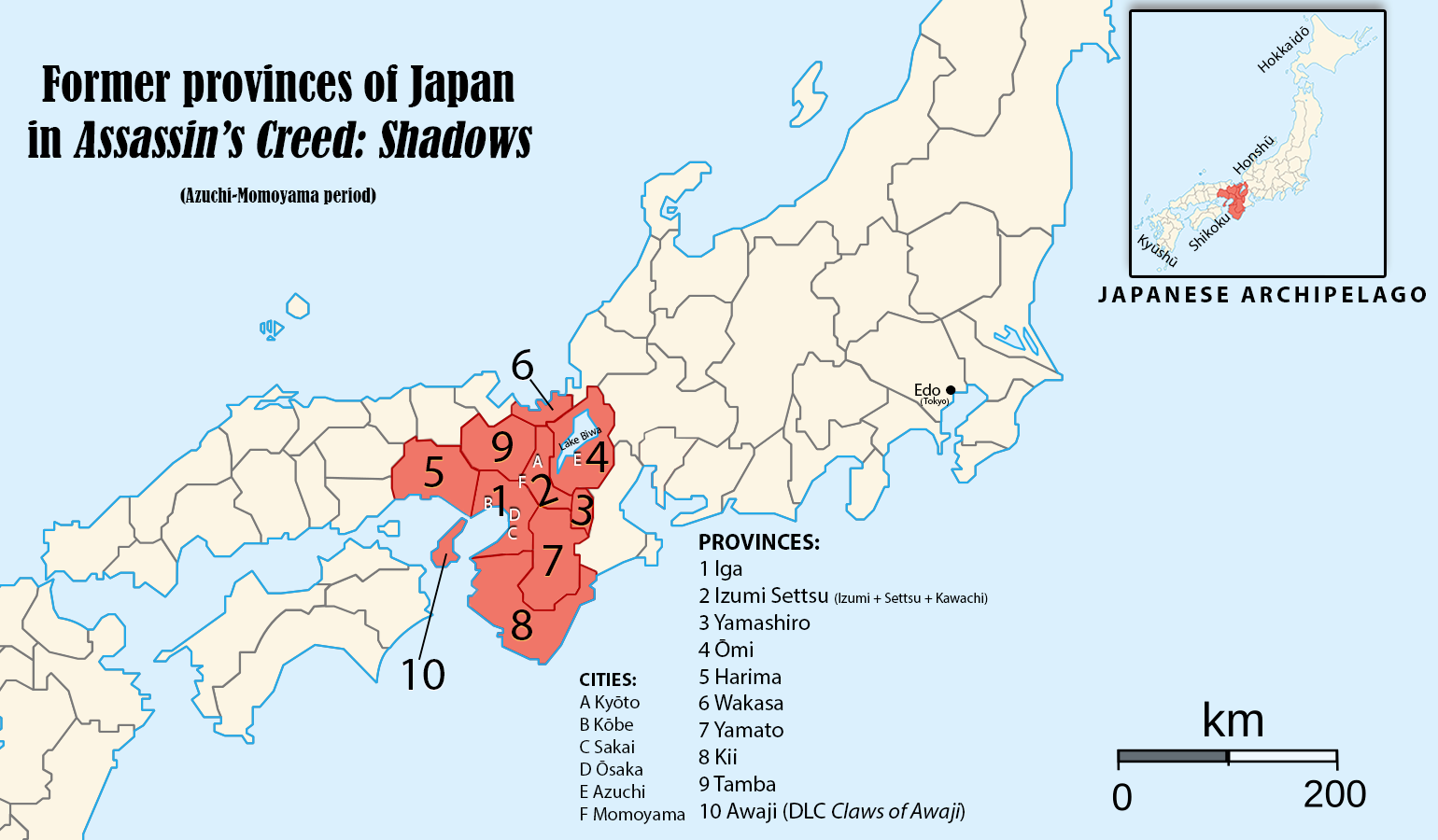
Map showing the historical provinces of Japan where the action of the game takes place

Assassin's Creed Shadows is set in feudal Japan, specifically starting in 1579 during the Azuchi-Momoyama period. This era marks the final stage of the Sengoku period, a time of intense civil war in Japan. The game features the historical figure Oda Nobunaga at the height of his power, following his victory over the Takeda clan using arquebus firearms. Key historical events include Nobunaga's assault on the Iga province in 1581, a significant battle involving the Iga ikki, known for their ninjutsu arts. Like previous Assassin's Creed titles, characters based on historical figures are present in the game, including the samurai Yasuke, one of the two playable characters, missionaries Luís Fróis and Alessandro Valignano, samurai Hattori Hanzo, Akechi Mitsuhide, and Ise Sadaoki, the sōhei Kyōnyo, merchants Imai Sōkun and Imai Sōkyū, and tea master Sen no Rikyū, among others.

The game world covers the Kansai region of central Japan, including locations like Kyoto, Kobe, Osaka, and the Iga province, with historically-accurate castles such as Takeda and Fukuchiyama, along with detailed historical landmarks and strongholds designed as intricate dungeons. This setting reflects the urbanization of Japan at the time, featuring bustling ports, samurai districts, and ornate architecture, all significant for parkour and exploration in the game. The influence of Portuguese traders and Jesuit missionaries, who introduced Christianity and new technologies like cannons and long guns to Japan, also plays a role in shaping the game's environment and narrative.

=== Plot ===
In 1581, the African slave Diogo arrives in Kyoto alongside a delegation of Jesuit priests, who seek to negotiate with daimyo Oda Nobunaga for the safe passage of their missionaries throughout Japan. Nobunaga grants the request on the condition that Diogo be transferred into his service. Diogo, renamed Yasuke, begins training to become a samurai and, six months later, accompanies Nobunaga on his invasion of Iga Province to exterminate the shinobi of the Iga ikki. During the battle, the young shinobi Fujibayashi Naoe is tasked by her father Nagato to take his Hidden Blade and recover a box hidden in a nearby kofun, which she must protect at all costs. However, Naoe is ambushed by a masked samurai, who injures her and takes the box. Nagato rescues her and, after recovering, Naoe tracks down the masked samurai, assassinates him, and recovers the box. As she escapes, Naoe is shot and cornered by the masked samurai's comrades, who again seize the box. Nagato comes to her aid, but is mortally wounded by the masked men, who leave with the box; with his dying breath, Nagato instructs Naoe to "follow the blade."

After recovering from her wounds, Naoe, seeking revenge on her father's killers and aiming to recover the stolen box, visits Tomiko, an old family friend. Tomiko grants Naoe usage of her homestead as a base to gather supplies and allies, and directs her to Sakai. There, Naoe finds leads to the whereabouts of two of the masked killers, and assassinates them both. She is then approached by Akechi Mitsuhide, who identifies Oda Nobunaga as the leader of the group, called the Shinbakufu, and enlists Naoe's help to eliminate him. Naoe infiltrates the Honnō-ji Temple and confronts Nobunaga, who reveals that Mitsuhide lied to her and that he is not part of the Shinbakufu. With Mitsuhide's army closing in, Nobunaga elects to commit seppuku with Yasuke's help while Naoe escapes.

Now a rōnin, Yasuke, seeking a new purpose, approaches Naoe and asks to join her. He reveals that, during the invasion of Iga, he fought and killed the Iga ikki's leader, Momochi Sandayu, who also wielded a Hidden Blade and urged him to help Naoe if he found her. Naoe initially refuses to forgive Yasuke for partaking in Nobunaga's assault on Iga, but is told by her young ally Junjiro that the masked samurai she had killed was his father. With Junjiro having learned to forgive Naoe for her actions, Naoe agrees to give Yasuke a chance to make amends.

Working together, the pair track down and eliminate more of the Shinbakufu, and in the process meet Nobunaga's former retainer, Tokugawa Ieyasu, and Hattori Hanzō, an erstwhile member of the Iga ikki. Hanzō warns Naoe to forget about the box, claiming that both her father and her mother, Tsuyu, died protecting it. However, seeing that Naoe will not back down, Hanzō instructs her to head to a kofun in Settsu to learn the truth about her parents. There, Naoe finds an Assassin hideout and journal, revealing that Emperor Go-Nara had tasked the Assassins to build a new Brotherhood in Japan, with Tsuyu being one of the Assassins given the task. Deciding to continue the Assassins' mission, Naoe, Yasuke, Tomiko, and Junjiro form the Kakushiba ikki (the "League of the Hidden Blade").

As Naoe and Yasuke build up their league with new recruits, they deal with the remaining Shinbakufu until only Mitsuhide and the group's mysterious leader remain. At the Battle of Yamazaki, Naoe and Yasuke join Hashiba Hideyoshi's army in besieging Shōryūji Castle, where Mitsuhide has taken refuge. After mortally wounding him, Mitsuhide identifies the leader of the Shinbakufu as former shōgun Ashikaga Yoshiaki, who sought to regain his power after being dethroned by Oda Nobunaga. With Mitsuhide dead, Hideyoshi claims victory and promises to reform Japan as Nobunaga's successor, to which Naoe warns him to keep his promise. Afterwards, she and Yasuke confront Yoshiaki, who offers to trade both the stolen box and information for his life. He reveals that the box is one of three, each containing one of the Imperial Regalia of Japan, and that an Assassin matching Tsuyu's description was spotted in Yamato. He also reveals that the Templar Order—which Yasuke has history with—supported the Shinbakufu, and that the Templar Kimura Kei is recruiting new members to the Order's cause in Kii.

Sparing Yoshiaki's life, Naoe and Yasuke split up to investigate their new leads. Naoe travels to Yamato, where she recalls the story Nagato had told her about Tsuyu. Many years prior, the Assassins, under Tsuyu's leadership, safeguarded the Imperial Regalia until they were massacred by the Shinbakufu. Tsuyu managed to protect one of the regalia and gave it to Nagato while she left to search for the rest, but never returned. Naoe finds the Assassins' intended hiding place for the regalia and returns her box, fulfilling her promise to her father. Hanzō then arrives and returns the second box, which Ieyasu recovered from the Templars. He admits that he had betrayed the Assassins out of jealousy at Tsuyu choosing Nagato over him, and sold the regalia's location to the Shinbakufu. Naoe ultimately forgives Hanzō and offers him a chance to correct his mistake by helping her find Tsuyu, who they both believe is still alive.

Meanwhile, Yasuke tracks down and eliminates both Kimura Kei and Duarte de Melo, the Portuguese Templar and slaver he had previously served. He then confronts Nuno Caro, the leader of the Templar Order in Japan, who had killed Yasuke's mother years prior after suspecting her of being a spy; Yasuke was nearly killed as well, but escaped thanks to a distraction from an Assassin. As Yasuke kills Caro, he proclaims his new identity as a member of the Kakushiba ikki, and declares war on the Templars.

==== Claws of Awaji ====
Hanzō contacts Naoe after finding a lead about Tsuyu's possible location on Awaji Island, which is firmly ruled by the Sanzoku Ippa, a group of outlaws affiliated with the Templars. Naoe locates and reunites with her mother, who has been held captive for years by Kimura Yukari, daughter of Kimura Kei, in an attempt to learn the whereabouts of the final Imperial Regalia, which Tsuyu had stolen and hidden from the Templars. However, Naoe is captured by Yukari, who reveals that she lured her to Awaji in the hopes that threatening her life would finally make Tsuyu reveal the regalia's location. Learning of Naoe's predicament, Yasuke mounts a rescue mission and frees both Naoe and Tsuyu, though the latter is wounded during their escape.

In no condition to fight, Tsuyu reluctantly tells Naoe and Yasuke of the regalia's hiding place so they can retrieve it. However, the Sanzoku Ippa ambush the pair and steal the regalia while Naoe and Yasuke are saved by a timely distraction from Hanzō. In order to reach Yukari and recover the regalia, Naoe and Yasuke then decide to weaken the Sanzoku Ippa's grip over Awaji by eliminating Yukari's three lieutenants: Imagawa Tomeji, Nowaki, and Yasuhira. This inspires the people of Awaji to revolt against the Sanzoku Ippa's oppression, allowing Naoe, Yasuke, and Hanzō to lead an assault on Yukari's stronghold at Iwaya Castle while Tsuyu recovers the regalia.

Yasuke confronts and duels Yukari, who reprimands Yasuke's former service to Oda Nobunaga and his newfound allegiance to the Kakushiba ikki, claiming that he is following the path imposed by others instead of forging his own destiny. Yasuke ultimately kills Yukari, while Naoe rescues Tsuyu after she is attacked by Yukari's soldiers during her escape with the regalia. As the two reconcile, Tsuyu accepts that her days as a warrior have passed and decides to instead become the mother Naoe never had. After being re-joined by Yasuke, the trio decide to return the Imperial Regalia to the Emperor, before Tsuyu leaves for Iga and encourages Naoe to spend time with Yasuke and Junjiro, her new family.

==== Story Drops ====
Sometime after forming the Kakushiba ikki, Naoe and Yasuke meet Rufino, a Portuguese translator and old friend of Tomiko's, who enlists their help to recover documents from a ship off Sakai's coast. The trio recovers the documents, revealed to be assassination contracts issued by the Templars, who seek to eliminate several local community leaders and replace them with their own allies. Naoe and Yasuke assassinate the Templar killers before they can eliminate their targets, but discover that Rufino used to work for the Templars and unknowingly helped them gather their information. While confronting Rufino and his friend Ermigo, the group is attacked by the Templar Gaspar and his men, who murder Ermigo when he attempts to defend Rufino. Naoe, Yasuke, and Rufino kill Gaspar, and the latter accepts to join the Kakushiba ikki to continue fighting against the Templars.

Later, Naoe and Yasuke come across a strange door in Wakasa and meet two wandering outlaws, Kane and Kinu. In exchange for allowing them to join the Kakushiba ikki, they provide Naoe and Yasuke with a trinket and a map to the locations of several glyphs across Japan. After interacting with all the glyphs, the pair use the trinket to open the door, revealing it was the entrance to an Isu vault found by Kassandra, who used it as a repository of weapons and artifacts. Naoe and Yasuke take several treasures from the vault and decide to leave it for the time being.

Eventually, in retaliation for Naoe and Yasuke's meddling with their plans, the Templars send their feared Black Cross (Note: The Black Cross is an enigmatic Templar rank introduced in the 2016 comic book series, Assassin's Creed: Templars, charged with eliminating corrupt Templars and searching for Pieces of Eden.) inquisitor, Sir Eamon Hathaway, to eliminate the pair, as well as search for an Isu site known as the "Observatory", believed to be located somewhere in Japan. (Note: This is the same Observatory introduced in Assassin's Creed IV: Black Flag (2013), which was located in Long Bay, Jamaica.) Naoe and Yasuke meet Hathaway, who reveals that he holds no grudge against them and promises to leave them alone so long as they do not interfere with his search. Refusing his offer, the pair track down Yang, a Chinese ship captain who brought Hathaway to Japan, and attempt to interrogate him, but Yang is killed by Hathaway's protégé and fellow Black Cross, Nirmala of Java. While Naoe goes to search the wreck of Yang's ship for more information on the Templars' mission, Yasuke is confronted by Hathaway and Nirmala, who overwhelm and mortally wound him. Overcoming his inner darkness by holding onto his cherished memories of his loved ones, Yasuke survives his wounds and is left to recover while Naoe and Rufino leave to stop the Templars after realizing they are searching for the vault in Wakasa.

Arriving at the vault, Naoe and Rufino witness Hathaway destroy a statue of Kassandra to reveal the true entrance to the Isu vault, which Kassandra had attempted to conceal from the Templars. The pair follow Hathaway and Nirmala inside, where Naoe fights Nirmala while Hathaway investigates the vault's contents, discovering it is not the Observatory as he had assumed. After Naoe is defeated, she is rescued by Rufino and a newly arrived Yasuke, allowing the group to gain the upper hand, kill Nirmala, and mortally wound Hathaway. With his dying breath, Hathaway explains that the vault contains one of the "pillars that hold up the world" (Note: This makes the Wakasa vault a "Seismic Temple", a type of Isu vault introduced in Assassin's Creed: Rogue (2014) which could create devastating earthquakes if disturbed.) and questions Yasuke's ability to recover from mortal wounds so quickly. (Note: Yasuke is implied to be a hybrid, a descendant of both humans and Isu who possesses an abnormally high concentration of Isu DNA, giving him superhuman abilities.) Naoe retrieves a crystal cube (Note: This is a blood vial, a type of Isu artifact used to store drops of blood for the purpose of being used alongside the Observatory.) dropped by Hathaway and, at Yasuke's urging, decides to leave the vault without discovering its functionality. As they depart, Yasuke breaks the vault's key to ensure its contents will remain hidden, and Naoe ponders contacting the Assassins to give them the crystal cube, ultimately deciding to do so when the time is right.

== Development ==
Assassin's Creed Shadows was announced at Ubisoft Forward in September 2022 under the working title Assassin's Creed: Codename Red along with its planned successor, Assassin's Creed: Codename Hexe. There, Ubisoft announced that Assassin's Creed would be entering a third period related to shifts in design philosophy and approaches to future games, all connected by a working concept called Assassin's Creed Infinity (later renamed to the Animus Hub). The first major gameplay details were announced on May 15, 2024, along with the final name and release date. It was also later revealed that Ubisoft Quebec, who had previously developed Assassin's Creed Odyssey and Assassin's Creed Syndicate, would be developing the game. Development began in 2020, following the release of Assassin's Creed Valhalla.

Shadows is the first game in the series to be aimed at the ninth generation of video game consoles (PlayStation 5 and Xbox Series X/S), dropping support for the eighth generation consoles (PlayStation 4 and Xbox One). Lead producer Karl Onnée said the hardware available in the newer consoles was necessary to support the new version of their engine that supplies effects like light, shadows, and dynamic weather.

During a Ubisoft financial meeting, CEO Yves Guillemot confirmed that while the company does not disclose production costs or any final costs, Shadows exceeded €100 million ($116 million) in expenses.

During a financial results web call Ubisoft has confirmed it plans to release additional versions of Assassin's Creed Shadows for "other machines".

== Marketing and release ==
Assassin's Creed Shadows was initially scheduled to release for iPadOS, macOS, PlayStation 5, Windows, and Xbox Series X/S on November 15, 2024. In September 2024, Ubisoft announced that, despite the game being feature complete, they opted to delay the release to February 14, 2025, for further polishing, citing insights gained from the Star Wars Outlaws launch in August. The company also cancelled the game's season pass and refunded existing pre-orders, with future pre-orders set to include the first expansion for free. In a shift from Ubisoft's previous release practices, the PC version would launch simultaneously on Steam, Epic Games Store, and Ubisoft Connect. In January 2025, Ubisoft postponed the release once again to March 20, as the company explored its sale options and to provide developers with more time to implement additional changes.

Shadows was rated as "CERO Z" in January 2025 by Japan's Computer Entertainment Rating Organization (CERO), which legally limits sale of the game to adults; CERO issued its rating based on the amount of gore that was present in the game such as body dismemberment. While the game will be released internationally with an in-game toggle to show or disable the gore, Ubisoft said that they are working to make a Japan-specific version of the game which will not include the toggle and eliminate the gore from the game to achieve a less strict CERO rating.

In February 2025, Ubisoft stated that pre-orders for the game were in line with those of Assassin's Creed Odyssey, the series' second-best-selling game. In that same month, it was reported that physical copies of the game for PlayStation 5 leaked.

A few months before the initial release date, All Elite Wrestling collaborated with Ubisoft to promote their game at All In 2024, with wrestler Will Ospreay having a special entrance featuring ninja-inspired choreography. The following year, at All In 2025, Ospreay had another special entrance inspired by the game, once again featuring a crowd of ninja-inspired extras.

Shadows was released for macOS, PlayStation 5, Windows, and Xbox Series X/S on March 20, 2025. For the promotion of the game on March 26, 2025, Ubisoft partnered with Lofi Girl.

=== Pre-release reception and controversy ===
Upon the release of the video game's premiere trailer on May 15, 2024, the decision to feature Yasuke as a central character prompted criticism online. Some users reacted negatively to the inclusion of a Black samurai protagonist instead of an indigenous Japanese one, accusing Ubisoft of "going woke", or stating that Yasuke was not a "real" samurai. Others noted that Ubisoft has never made a game with a male East Asian protagonist. The online backlash led to harassment and threats directed at the game developers. Sachi Schmidt-Hori, an associate professor at Dartmouth College in Japanese culture who had aided Ubisoft in reviewing the game's dialog for accuracy, became a target for harassment, though she was able to fend off some of these attacks herself. Multiple commentators, including Laurence Russell of Wired, likened the backlash to the Gamergate harassment campaign and the alt-right. Elon Musk criticized Assassin's Creed Shadows and Ubisoft for "woke" content, arguing that "DEI kills art", and specified the inclusion of Yasuke as offensive. Ubisoft responded by saying that Musk's comments were "just feeding hatred" and that they were focused on producing a game, not pushing politics. Just prior to release, Ubisoft offered guidance and resources to its developers in regards to their social media accounts and potential harassment.

A collectible figure was scheduled to be released in promotion for the game. The figure used a design similar to the damaged one-legged Torii gate Sannō Shrine in Nagasaki, located less than a mile from the epicenter of the nuclear bombing of Nagasaki. It was removed from sale following claims of cultural insensitivity. In February 2025, leaked gameplay footage showed Yasuke being able to enter the Itatehyōzu Shrine and destroy the altar, causing controversy. Shrine officials said they were not consulted about the shrine's usage in the game and that they would take "appropriate action" against the game. Following complaints from Hiroyuki Kada of the Japanese House of Councillors and Shigeru Ishiba, Prime Minister of Japan, Ubisoft removed the ability to destroy certain objects within temples, as well as reducing the "amount of blood shed by NPCs in the various shrines and temples across Assassin's Creed Shadows".

Ubisoft defended their position on their choices for Yasuke in response to the criticism. Game director Charles Benoit said that Yasuke was chosen because players could discover Japan at the same time as Yasuke, "through his eyes, the eyes of a foreigner". Matt Kim of IGN praised the choice of Yasuke to differentiate itself from other samurai games featuring Asian protagonists. Scholar Thomas Lockley defended Yasuke's portrayal as a samurai, and stated that no reputable Japanese historian had questioned Yasuke's samurai status.

In part due to the criticism Ubisoft received over Yasuke, the company reportedly cancelled development of another Assassin's Creed title in 2024 that took place during the American Civil War and Reconstruction era, where the main character would have been a Black man who escaped enslavement, was recruited by the Assassins, and took on groups like the Ku Klux Klan.

== Additional content ==
On May 27, 2025, Shadows received its first additional content in the form of crossovers with Balatro and Dead by Daylight, including cosmetic items and a new quest.

Claws of Awaji, the first paid downloadable content pack for the game, was released on September 16, 2025. Set on Awaji Island, it includes new gears and abilities, as well as a 10-hour story campaign. This expansion pack was developed by Ubisoft Bordeaux.

From May 6, 2025, to June 16, 2026, Ubisoft periodically released Story Drops for the game, small updates that introduced additional quests featuring both new and familiar characters. The first of these, The Works of Luis Frois, focused on the titular character, whom Yasuke met and befriended during the main story campaign of Shadows. The second Story Drop, titled A Critical Encounter, was released on June 25 and added a new questline and a new recruitable ally named Rufino (voiced by Robbie Daymond, reprising his role from a Critical Role one-shot); the update also introduced a new difficulty setting, 'Nightmare', and other gameplay features. The third Story Drop, released on November 25, added a new quest called "A Puzzlement", as well as a limited-time crossover with Attack on Titan, featuring cosmetic items for both Naoe and Yasuke and a special questline.

On June 9, 2026, Ubisoft announced that the final major update for Assassin's Creed Shadows would be released on June 16. The update introduced a concluding story quest, Black Tides, in which Naoe and Yasuke confront two elite Templars known as the "Black Cross". It also added a new endgame activity called "Domains", a replayable Animus simulation mode featuring five challenge maps with rotating modifiers and unique rewards. Additional Animus HUB crossover projects, "Riptides" and "Undertow", were also introduced, offering themed cosmetic rewards and gear. The update also included the final Modern Day Rift, Horizon, which bridged Shadows to Assassin's Creed Black Flag Resynced and the Animus HUB.

== Reception ==
=== Critical reception ===
Reception

Aggregate scores
| Aggregator | Score |
|---|---|
| Metacritic | (PC) 79/100 (PS5) 81/100 (XSXS) 85/100 (NS2) 80/100 |
| OpenCritic | 82% |

Review scores
| Publication | Score |
|---|---|
| Digital Trends | 3.5/5 |
| Eurogamer | 4/5 |
| Famitsu | 36/40 |
| Game Informer | 8.5/10 |
| GameSpot | 8/10 |
| GamesRadar+ | 4/5 |
| Hardcore Gamer | 3.5/5 |
| IGN | 8/10 |
| NME | 5/5 |
| PC Gamer (US) | 80/100 |
| PCGamesN | 6/10 |
| Push Square | 8/10 |
| Shacknews | 8/10 |
| The Guardian | 4/5 |
| Video Games Chronicle | 4/5 |
| VG247 | 5/5 |

Assassin's Creed Shadows received "generally favorable" reviews from critics, according to review aggregator website Metacritic, and 82% of critics recommend the game according to OpenCritic. In Japan, four critics from Famitsu gave the game a total score of 36 out of 40.

Giovanni Colantonio from Digital Trends praised the game for its "memorable characters" and "peaceful exploration" but criticised its "messy story" and "thin content". Eurogamer's Tom Phillips wrote that it "honours the beauty of feudal Japan, even if its strongest moments are saved for the personal stories of its two protagonists." Wesley LeBlanc of Game Informer wrote that "Shadows, like its predecessors, has now yielded its own memory for me to store in my personal Animus: a reminder that when it comes to this medium, gameplay is king. In Shadows, playing as Yasuke and Naoe is as powerful as the Shoguns that ruled during this era of Japan." GameSpot's Jordan Ramée said that it "messes with a good thing by including one too many playable protagonists, but Naoe is a valuable new addition to the legacy". Andrew Brown of GamesRadar+ said that it "thrives on boldness. Its dual protagonists improve on the series' stealth-driven roots and modern RPG leanings, though they're let down by a vague story that fails to make full use of either character." Kevin Dunsmore of Hardcore Gamer thought it "had a lot of elements on paper that made it sound like it could be the best Assassin's Creed game in years." but said "it also falls short on nearly as many." IGN's Jarrett Green wrote it "creates one of the best versions of the open-world style it's been honing for the last decade". Green noted the game's refined mechanics and setting in feudal Japan, but criticized its imbalanced combat and missed storytelling opportunities. Echo Apsey of NME said "A fantastic story and well-developed characters ground the game in a believable era of Japan that is fun to explore. It confidently sets the standard for the next games in the franchise." Oscar Gonzalez of CNET highlighted the successful blend of action and stealth, while noting quirks in quest design and English voice acting.

Morgan Park of PC Gamer criticized the game's dull story, "bland cast, and barrage of quests", and Fraser Brown said that there was "a lot to like" but criticized the RPG elements. Reid McCarter of PCGamesN said "While its open world is stunning, its combat is robust, and its dual-protagonist design is somewhat novel, Assassin's Creed Shadows proves too repetitive and dramatically flat to wholeheartedly recommend taking its trip back in time." Push Square's Robert Ramsey praised the game for its "intriguing, twisting story", "great protagonists", "solid combat" and "striking soundtrack" but criticised its forced RPG elements and "rough" English dub. Aidan O'Brien from Shacknews praised the game for its "interesting characters" and fun combat but noted that the "traversal" mechanics "can occasionally feel clunky and awkward" and that there was occasional "weak" voice acting from the NPCs. The Guardian's Daniella Lucas praised the game's "excellent performances and emotionally resonant moments". Video Game Chronicle's Jordan Middler called it "the best Assassin's Creed game in 10 years". Dom Peppiatt from VG247 said "it's so fun to play, it's telling a gripping story, and there is so much sense of progress and reward for every little thing you do that it actually feels like an open world game".

=== Sales ===
Ubisoft stated that Assassin's Creed Shadows surpassed a million players on its release date and three million players within a week. Steam showed a concurrent player count peak of 41,412 on launch day, growing to 64,825 during the first weekend after launch. The feat established the game as the highest Assassin's Creed game by concurrent players on Steam to date. According to Ubisoft's fiscal report for its 2025 fiscal year, ending March 31, 2025, Assassin's Creed Shadows has outperformed Assassin's Creed Odyssey in consumer spending to date and achieved the second-highest day-one sales revenue in the history of the franchise, ranking only behind Assassin's Creed Valhalla. On its half-year 2026 report ending September 30, 2025, Ubisoft reported that Shadows was "overperforming".

According to analysis by market research firm Circana, Shadows was the best-selling game of March 2025 in the U.S. They ranked the game as the second-best selling game of the year in the U.S. as of April, behind Monster Hunter Wilds and ahead of The Elder Scrolls IV: Oblivion Remastered. By July, it had fallen to third place, with Monster Hunter Wilds and The Elder Scrolls IV: Oblivion Remastered surpassing it, while it remained ahead of Call of Duty: Black Ops 6. According to market research firm GfK, Assassin's Creed Shadows had the largest physical video game launch in the United Kingdom in 2025, surpassing Monster Hunter Wilds. In March 2025, market research firm Newzoo reported that it debuted as the second highest-grossing game across the United States, United Kingdom, Germany, France, Spain, and Italy, trailing only Fortnite. According to video game sales-tracking service GSD as of July 2025, Shadows was Europe's best-selling new PC and console game released in 2025 and the second best-selling 2025 game overall behind EA Sports FC 25.

Rhys Elliott of the games market data firm Alinea Analytics said that while Ubisoft says Shadows had 2 million players by March 2025, PlayStation 5 and Steam data from the first two days showed that only half of those appeared to come from sales, the other half being from subscription services. According to Ubisoft's mid-2025 financial results, Shadows surpassed the 5 million player mark by July 2025 and performed in line with expectations.

=== Awards ===
| Year | Award | Category | Result | Ref. |
|---|---|---|---|---|
| 2024 | Golden Joystick Awards | Most Wanted | Nominated | |
| 2025 | App Store Awards | Best macOS game | Nominated | |
| 2025 | Golden Joystick Awards | Best Visual Design | Nominated | |
| 2025 | Golden Joystick Awards | Best Game Expansion | Nominated | |
| 2025 | The Game Awards 2025 | Innovation in Accessibility | Nominated | |
| 2026 | 29th Annual D.I.C.E. Awards | Outstanding Technical Achievement | Nominated | |
| 2026 | 22nd British Academy Games Awards | Animation | Longlisted | |
