= Ubisoft Singapore =

Singaporean video game developer

Ubisoft Singapore Pte. Ltd.
- Type: Subsidiary
- Industry: Video games
- Founded: 2008; 18 years ago
- Headquarters: Fusionopolis, One-north, Singapore
- Key people: Jean-Francois Vallee (managing director)
- Number of employees: 350 (2018)
- Parent: Ubisoft
- Website: www.ubisoftsingapore.com

Ubisoft Singapore Pte. Ltd. is a Singaporean video game developer and studio of Ubisoft based at Fusionopolis in One-north, Singapore. The studio was founded in 2008 and has contributed to the majority of Assassin's Creed games. It also led the development of the 2024 title Skull and Bones.

== History ==
Ubisoft Singapore is a development studio based in Singapore that was established in 2008 by French video game company Ubisoft. The studio was founded by a small team who were working at the company's Paris headquarters. They had a goal to initiate a game-production network in Southeast Asia. The studio is located at Fusionopolis, a research and development complex in the one-north district.

Singapore's openness to international business, the availability of staff trained in software development, and the popularity of the emerging free-to-play and mobile game markets in Asia were key factors in Ubisoft's decision to open a studio in the country. The studio works closely with DigiPen's international campus in Singapore on a program to foster local talent for video game development. Ubisoft Singapore operates with multiple teams working on different projects simultaneously.

In 2017, the studio was still headed by its initial leadership team and had grown to over 300 employees. Former members of studio established other Ubisoft operations in Asia, including Ubisoft Philippines and Ubisoft Chengdu. As of July 2018, the studio employs 350 people led by Hugues Ricour, who serves as managing director for Ubisoft Singapore and sister studio Ubisoft Philippines.

Ubisoft Singapore was one of several studios (such as Ubisoft Toronto) that were included in the larger reports of sexual harassment and discrimination within the whole of Ubisoft starting in 2020; Ricour stepped down as managing director as part of Ubisoft's internal reviews from these allegations but remained with the studio in November 2020. He was succeeded by Darryl Long. Following a July 2021 report from Kotaku regarding sexual harassment and workplace discrimination within the studio, Singapore's Tripartite Alliance for Fair and Progressive Employment Practices (TAFEP) began its own investigation into the studio in August 2021.

Ubisoft announced on 1 June 2023 that Darryl Long would become managing director of its Toronto office. Jean-Francois Vallee then took over the role on 1 January 2024.

== Games ==
Ubisoft Singapore's first project was Teenage Mutant Ninja Turtles: Turtles in Time Re-Shelled (2009), a remake of an existing arcade game. After the success of 2007's Assassin's Creed, Ubisoft began devoting more resources to its 2009 sequel with the intention of elevating Assassin's Creed to be the company's flagship series. This created an opportunity for Ubisoft Singapore to contribute to Assassin's Creed 2's development by producing assets and designing the game's linear challenges. Several members of staff who worked on the first Assassin's Creed game moved to the Singapore to provide the team with some experience. As Ubisoft Singapore continued working on the series, they were granted with more responsibility, which led them to take charge of more distinctive parts of the games, including the naval combat in 2012's Assassin's Creed III. The studio has worked on every Assassin's Creed title since the second game, including major contributions to Unity (2014), Syndicate (2015), and Origins (2017).

The studio's softography also includes Tom Clancy's Ghost Recon Phantoms, a free-to-play, microtransaction-supported tactical shooter that launched in 2012 but was closed down 2016. The studio led development on the naval warfare game Skull and Bones.

In 2026, the studio led development of Assassin's Creed Black Flag Resynced, a remake of Assassin's Creed IV: Black Flag.

=== Lead development ===
Year	Title	Platform(s)	Ref.
2009	Teenage Mutant Ninja Turtles: Turtles in Time Re-Shelled	PlayStation 3, Xbox 360	
2010	Prince of Persia: The Forgotten Sands	PlayStation 3, Wii, Windows, Xbox 360	
2014	Tom Clancy's Ghost Recon Phantoms	Windows	
2024	Skull and Bones	PlayStation 5, Windows, Xbox Series X/S	
2026	Assassin's Creed Black Flag Resynced	PlayStation 5, Windows, Xbox Series X/S	

=== Support development ===
Year	Title	Platform(s)	Ref.
2009	Assassin's Creed II	PlayStation 3, PlayStation 4, Windows, Xbox 360, Xbox One	
2011	Assassin's Creed: Revelations	PlayStation 3, PlayStation 4, Windows, Xbox 360, Xbox One	
2012	Tom Clancy's Ghost Recon: Future Soldier	PlayStation 3, Windows, Xbox 360	
2012	Assassin's Creed III	PlayStation 3, Wii U, Windows, Xbox 360	
2013	Assassin's Creed IV: Black Flag	PlayStation 3, PlayStation 4, Nintendo Switch, Wii U, Windows, Xbox 360	
2014	Assassin's Creed Unity	PlayStation 4, Stadia, Windows, Xbox One	
2014	Assassin's Creed Rogue	PlayStation 3, PlayStation 4, Nintendo Switch, Windows, Xbox 360, Xbox One	
2015	Assassin's Creed Syndicate	PlayStation 4, Stadia, Windows, Xbox One	
2017	Assassin's Creed Origins	PlayStation 4, Stadia, Windows, Xbox One	
2018	Assassin's Creed Odyssey	Nintendo Switch, PlayStation 4, Stadia, Windows, Xbox One	
2020	Assassin's Creed Valhalla	PlayStation 4, PlayStation 5, Windows, Xbox One, Xbox Series X/S, Stadia	
2023	Assassin's Creed Mirage	PlayStation 4, PlayStation 5, Windows, Xbox One, Xbox Series X/S	
2025	Assassin's Creed Shadows	PlayStation 5, Windows, Xbox Series X/S	
