= Hyper Scape =

2020 first-person shooter video game

- Developer: Ubisoft Montreal
- Publisher: Ubisoft
- Director: Jean-Christophe Guyot
- Producer: Graeme Jennings
- Writers: Jesse Scoble; Avery di Soriano; Cassandra Khaw; Mikko Rautalahti; Shoma Patnaik
- Composer: DJ Hyper
- Engine: AnvilNext 2.0
- Platforms: Microsoft Windows; PlayStation 4; Xbox One
- Release: August 11, 2020
- Genres: Battle royale, first-person shooter
- Mode: Multiplayer

Hyper Scape was a free-to-play first-person shooter battle royale game developed by Ubisoft Montreal and published by Ubisoft for Microsoft Windows, PlayStation 4 and Xbox One. The game was notable for its integration with video game live streamers which allowed viewers on Twitch to affect the outcome of a match.

The open beta for Microsoft Windows was released on July 12, 2020. The game was released on Microsoft Windows, PlayStation 4 and Xbox One on August 11, 2020. It received mixed reactions, with praise for its graphics, map design and deviations from the genre but criticism for its unbalanced gunplay and game mechanics. The game failed to meet expectations from players, with Ubisoft announcing that they would start overhauling the game's gameplay and systems. The game shut down on April 28, 2022.

== Gameplay ==
The game's main mode shares elements with other battle royale games, where up to 100 players are dropped on to a map that slowly shrinks over time with players seeking to eliminate the competition. One main difference between Hyper Scape and other popular battle royale games is that in Hyper Scape, insteading of a circle shrinking as the game progresses, random sectors of the map disappear. The game however differs in that once the last sector closes, a crown appears, any player that is able to hold on to the crown for 60 seconds is automatically declared the winner. Alternatively, the game also ends when only one player or team remains.

Throughout the game, players can find both weapons as well as special abilities known as "Hacks," such as letting the player transform into a giant ball from which they can bounce around, or letting them become invisible. Players can only have two weapons and hacks available at a time, although each item can be swapped out during a round.

When a player is killed in the squad game mode, they become an "Echo". While Echos can't kill any opponents they are able to "ping" other members of their team to alert them to dangers or points of interest. When an enemy is killed, they drop a revive point which allows a team to respawn fallen teammates.

Throughout the match the AI host can modify the game world, including revealing every enemy on the game's minimap, giving weapons infinite ammo or turning on a low-gravity mode. Viewers watching the game on Twitch can vote, which will help the AI decide what modifications to turn on.

Like many games in the Battle Royale genre, Hyper Scape uses a tiered battle pass as a reward system for its players. Each season, there will be a battle pass with 100 tiers, each of them including at least one reward. The technical test had a free battlepass with 10 tiers, with 2 player skins at tier 10. The open beta had a 30 tier battle pass. Possible rewards include new champions along with player skins, weapon skins, melee weapons, deployment pods, emblems and sprays, none of which give the player any competitive advantage. Some battle pass rewards would require an Amazon Prime Gaming membership to claim those rewards.

In order to move up a tier on the battle pass, players need to gain only 200 experience points. Those points can be obtained in many ways; completing daily and weekly challenges, performing well in games as well as watching and interacting with Twitch streamers will net you experience points. Ubisoft insists that playing the game is still the best way to rank up; players can only earn up to 400 experience points - or 2 tiers - per day, where there is no limit when actually playing the game.

== Synopsis ==
The game takes place in the year 2054 in Neo Arcadia, part of a metaverse created by the company Prisma Dimensions. Within this metaverse, players do battle with each other in a sport known as Crown Rush. The setting has been likened to that of The Oasis found in Ready Player One.

In the decades leading to the 2050s, compounding crises—including climate disasters, migration, and automation-driven unemployment—widen economic inequality. In response, the technology corporation Prisma Dimensions launches the Hyper Scape, a virtual global network handling employment, education, and entertainment. Following incidents involving player disappearances in the physical world and simulation breaches by hackers, a group of individuals attempts to uncover the system's underlying anomalies.

== Development ==
In development for two years, the game was designed around the idea of "Game as a spectacle." This came about because the developers noticed that, with live streaming services like Twitch, the developers, as well as gamers in general, were watching games about as much as they were playing them, with director Christophe Guyot noting that they weren't only answering to gamers anymore, but rather also to viewers. Thus the team " wanted to bring streamers, players, and viewers together into one thing".

Although teased by Ubisoft, the game was officially revealed on July 2, 2020, when many streamers on Twitch suddenly began playing it with a trailer being released later in the day. The Verge compared this to both Apex Legends and Valorant which were also announced in such a manner.

On January 27, 2022, Ubisoft posted that the game would be shutting down in 90 days, on April 27.

== Reception ==
Reception

Aggregate scores
Aggregator	Score
Metacritic	(PC) 68/100 (PS4) 62/100 (XONE) 60/100
OpenCritic	15% recommend

The game received "mixed or average reviews" from critics according to review aggregator platform Metacritic. Fellow review aggregator OpenCritic assessed that the game received weak approval, being recommended by 15% of critics. Viewership went through a typical boom-and-bust cycle, not uncommon for releases from big studios – going from being one of the most-viewed games on Twitch.tv briefly during beta testing, to "abysmal viewership just one day after release" in August. Ubisoft announced in October 2020 that this game had failed to meet the expectations from players and the company, and revealed that they would start overhauling the game's gameplay and systems.
