= Where the Wild Things Are (video game) =

2009 video game

- North American Xbox 360 box art
- Developers: Griptonite Games (PS3, Wii, X360); WayForward Technologies (DS)
- Publisher: Warner Bros. Interactive Entertainment
- Directors: David Sears (PS3, Wii, X360); Robert Buchanan (DS)
- Producers: Jason Gholston, Brian C. McAuliffe, Alex Pantelias (PS3, Wii, X360); Jeff Pomegranate (DS)
- Designers: David Sears, Darby McDevitt, Geoff Card (PS3, Wii, X360); Robert Buchanan (DS)
- Programmers: Jeff Evertt, Bob Scott (PS3, Wii, X360); Lee McDole (DS)
- Artists: Mario Ortiz, Jason Piel (PS3, Wii, X360); Henk Nieborg (DS)
- Writer: Darby McDevitt
- Composers: Westlee Brent Latta, Kelley Logsdon (PS3, Wii, X360); Stephen Geering (DS)
- Engine: Havok (PS3, Wii, X360)
- Platforms: Nintendo DS, Wii, Xbox 360, PlayStation 3
- Release: Nintendo DS, Wii, Xbox 360: NA: October 13, 2009; AU: November 25, 2009; EU: November 27, 2009; PlayStation 3: NA: October 13, 2009; EU: November 27, 2009; AU: December 3, 2009
- Genre: Platform-adventure

Where the Wild Things Are is a platform-adventure video game released in 2009. It is based on the movie of the same name, released the same day. The game is available for PlayStation 3, Wii and Xbox 360 as well as Nintendo DS. It was developed by Griptonite Games, except for the Nintendo DS, which was developed by WayForward Technologies. All versions were published by Warner Bros. Games.

== Plot ==
The game begins with Max, a young boy, arriving on an island and discovering a scepter among a pile of bones. After following a bull-like creature, he stumbles upon the village of the Wild Things, a group of fearsome looking monsters. The Wild Things attempt to eat Max, who cries "Be still!" causing them to jump back in fear and knock over the village. Impressed, they introduce themselves and invite Max to stay with them.

The game then goes through a series of events with Max helping out the Wild Things, or exploring the island with them, all the while investigating the appearance of strange black gunk and the "shadow creatures" emerging from it. Tensions rise in the group, however, causing some of the Wild Things to try to get rid of Max. But Max saves them from the shadow creatures and rescues them from Nowhere, a strange dimension accessed by portals on the island, causing the Wild Things to crown Max their king for his bravery. They throw a wild rumpus to celebrate.

Douglas, a bird-like Wild Thing, soon realizes that the Moon is falling to Earth and will destroy the island. After a bid to find a new island fails, Carol, a third Wild Thing, proposes that they escape to the Moon by building a tower to reach it. Upon its completion, the Wild Things and Max climb the tower, battling the shadow creatures and avoiding the rising gunk, and successfully reach the top. Max jumps and almost doesn't make it, but is rescued by the Wild Things.

As they celebrate in their new home, Max's scepter begins to shoot fireworks into the sky. The Bull, who decided to stay behind in Nowhere, sees this and smiles. He lies down happy in his new home, as the camera pans up to show the Moon, back in the sky in its rightful place.

== Gameplay ==
The console versions of Where the Wild Things Are have the player controlling a young boy named Max as he interacts with creatures and explores an island. Max can attack enemies with his scepter, and as the game progresses, he acquires new abilities such as physical feats and commands over the creatures. While platform segments make up a large part of the game, it also includes racing and a boating stage. Max is also able to discover hidden items and unlock new paths in the village.

The Nintendo DS version of the game consists of 2D side-scrolling. Max is essentially limited to running and jumping, roaring at enemies, and throwing objects. Some levels allow Max to traverse background and foreground layers of the stage.

== Reception ==
Reception

Aggregate score
Aggregator	Score			
Aggregator	DS	PS3	Wii	Xbox 360
Metacritic	62/100	53/100	65/100	51/100

Review scores
Publication	Score			
Publication	DS	PS3	Wii	Xbox 360
GamesMaster	N/A	N/A	69%	N/A
IGN	6.5/10	4.7/10	4.7/10	4.7/10
NGamer	62%	N/A	N/A	N/A
Nintendo World Report	N/A	N/A	7.5/10	N/A
Official Nintendo Magazine	60%	N/A	N/A	N/A
Official Xbox Magazine (UK)	N/A	N/A	N/A	5/10
Official Xbox Magazine (US)	N/A	N/A	N/A	6.5/10
Play	N/A	56%	N/A	N/A
PlayStation: The Official Magazine	N/A	3/5	N/A	N/A

Where the Wild Things Are received "mixed" reviews on all platforms according to the review aggregation website Metacritic. While acknowledging its graphics and other elements as commendable, the majority of critics noted the game's lack of depth as a major pitfall.

Seth Schiesel of The New York Times considered the Wii version "more than a little disappointing". He also noted that while it's "not a sloppy or slipshod game, the combat in Wild Things could charitably be described as minimalist in that all you ever have to do, or get to do, is pull the same trigger over and over". Schiesel added that "nothing in the writing, the story, the gameplay or the world design lends any depth to their characters or the environment around them".

GameDaily's Robert Workman called the PlayStation 3 version "a breezy little adventure. However, it only lasts a few hours, and once it's over, all that's left for you to do is hang around the Wild Things' village". He praised the audio with its musical cues and "terrific" voice acting. Workman sums it up by stating that the title "doesn't earn a strong recommendation. Although the platforming isn't bad, the lack of replay value and small visual problems take away from the overall adventure. However, if you've got kids or you're a fan of Spike Jonze's film, you might be up for some Rumpus".

Ryan Clements of IGN considered the Nintendo DS version "much better" than the console versions but noted its "repetitive design" and "not terribly exciting" gameplay. Clements stressed the frustration of the roaring and items pick-up actions being accomplished by the same buttons as well as a lack of actual platforming. He summed up with: "As it stands, Where the Wild Things DS is easily recommended over its console brethren, but I'd rather play New Super Mario Bros."
