= Tom Clancy's Ghost Recon Phantoms =

2014 multiplayer shooter video game

- Developer: Ubisoft Singapore
- Publisher: Ubisoft
- Series: Tom Clancy's Ghost Recon
- Platform: Microsoft Windows
- Release: WW: April 10, 2014
- Genre: Tactical shooter
- Mode: Multiplayer

Tom Clancy's Ghost Recon Phantoms was a multiplayer third-person tactical shooter video game, released in 2014 as a free-to-play game for Microsoft Windows. The game is part of Tom Clancy's Ghost Recon series.

On August 25, 2016, Ubisoft announced that it would shut down Phantoms' servers on December 1, 2016, due to "a slow but steady decline in users".

== Gameplay ==
Ghost Recon Phantoms was a third-person cover-based multiplayer tactical shooter with MOBA elements; player could choose between three classes: Recon, Support and Assault. Each class had unique abilities (called Devices in-game), with player being able to equip one of two active abilities and one of two passive ones; player could also choose between two primary weapon classes for each of the operator classes. Recon could choose between a cloaking device (similar to thermo-optical camouflage as seen in Ghost in the Shell or Predator franchises) that allowed for temporary invisibility (still detectable via small visual distortions like in the aforementioned movie franchises) as well as seeing enemy operators' laser beams from laser designators if those were equipped; or a scanning device that emitted a conical impulse that was able to detect enemies behind walls or other sorts of covers, as well as detecting cloaked enemy Recons, within the device's effective range; passive devices for this class consisted of a gunshot detector capable of picking up a non-suppressed weapons fire at a certain distance and marking shooter with a frame corresponding to shooter's silhouette (in height and position) on Recon's HUD, as well as his teammates within the effective range of the device; or motion detector, likewise marking running enemies with a frame for Recon and his nearby allies. Aside from a device's primary function, it also granted an operator assistance points should his teammates make use of the device whether by killing an affected enemy, or capture the point. Support class could choose between either an EMP device that instantly drained batteries of enemies that were in device's effective range when the device was activated (batteries powered the use of active devices), or a dome-shaped force field around the Support, that could also fit around three other players within its reach for a coordinated push to capture an objective, or just get past a heavily defended choke point. Support's passive abilities either granted teammates faster recharge for their devices batteries, or ammo regen. Finally, Assaults had at their disposal bulletproof shield for a quick assault maneuver (the ability substantially raised Assault's normal speed) that knocked down any enemies in Assault's path and incapacitated them for a short time, allowing Assault's teammates to safely dispose of affected enemy combatants (rushing Assault was impervious to any projectile damage coming from his front, but could still be harmed by attacks from sides and behind); or a microwave heat generator, suppressing any enemy within Assault's direct vicinity, making them unable to aim, shoot, and make quick escape (save for escaping via vaulting over a nearby low cover), while also dealing constant damage-over-time, that was even capable of killing an unlucky enemy who couldn't run away, should an Assault focus his attention on an enemy cut off from escape routs, provided that there was enough time left for the device to run before having to be recharged, and/or the enemy's health was low enough, though it could still kill players with full health, depending on the inserts in a given opponent's body armor, and additional upgrades in Assault's device. Passive devices for that class either provided teammates with additional armor, or sped up health regeneration. Due to heavy focus on team-play, each of these classes and their abilities synergized with one another, i.e. after Recon detected enemy positions, an Assault could use that data to initiate a shield rush, while the opposing team's Support, using the same kind of information from his Recons' devices, could wind utilize his EMP device to stop the push dead in its tracks, or initiate a counter-push under the cover of Support's bulletproof force field, and so on.

There were four game types: Private Match, Team Death match, Clan Match and Team Capture; the latter two could be played in one of following three game modes: Conquest, Onslaught, and Holdout.

== Development ==
Ghost Recon Phantoms was previously known as Ghost Recon Online during the beta phase.

=== Wii U version ===
On 24 May 2011, Ubisoft announced that its Singapore studio would develop Ghost Recon Online for the latter half of 2011, following an initial closed beta. This game was supported by micro transactions. On 7 June 2011, Nintendo announced at the Electronic Entertainment Expo that Ubisoft would release the game for the Wii U. Also, Ubisoft presented trailers and demos for the Wii U version of the game. The Windows version was confirmed to be a free-to-play game, and requires a Uplay account. Whilst not officially confirmed to be a free-to-play model as well for the Wii U as of January 2013, Nintendo's then president and CEO Satoru Iwata commented in an interview that he has no opposition against this model and is willing to work with it.

Despite the fact the Wii U version of the game was not presented during either Ubisoft's or Nintendo's conferences at E3 2012, Ubisoft reaffirmed that the game was still coming to Wii U. According to Ubisoft's senior vice president of sales and marketing Tony Key, he says that "Ghost Recon Online is being developed for the PC first. That was always the plan. The team is taking a little bit longer than they thought they would to get Ghost Recon Online to the level and quality that they want and that definitely has had an impact on how much time they're able to spend on the Wii U version because we want to make sure we get it right." Key also states that much of the development team behind the Wii U version of the game are also working on the PC version, and that focus will shift to the Wii U once the PC version is completed.

== Reception ==
Reception

Aggregate score
Aggregator	Score
Metacritic	(PC) 70/100

Review score
Publication	Score
IGN	(PC) 7.5/10

Tom Clancy's Ghost Recon Phantoms received an aggregate score of 70 at Metacritic indicating "mixed or average reviews". IGN also gave mixed positive reviews with a score of 7.5 out of 10. Lief Johnson from IGN said "It may seem a little strange to see Ubisoft releasing a free-to-play installment of the long-running Ghost Recon series so soon after May’s release of Ghost Recon: Future Soldier, but here it is" as of being surprised to see a free-to-play game by Ubisoft. There were more than a thousand U.S. dollars' worth of DLC, making this game the most expensive one released by Ubisoft.
