= Ubisoft Anvil =

Game engine developed by Ubisoft Montreal

- Developer: Ubisoft Montreal
- Platform: Microsoft Windows, macOS, iOS, iPadOS, PlayStation 3, PlayStation 4, PlayStation 5, PlayStation Vita, Wii U, Nintendo Switch, Nintendo Switch 2, Stadia, Xbox 360, Xbox One, Xbox Series X/S
- Type: Game engine
- License: Proprietary
- Website: www.ubisoft.com/en-us/company/how-we-make-games/technology

Ubisoft Anvil (until 2009 known as Scimitar and between 2012 and 2020 as AnvilNext) is a game engine created by Ubisoft Montreal and used in the Assassin's Creed video game series as well as other Ubisoft games. The engine is used on Microsoft Windows, macOS, Nintendo Switch, Nintendo Switch 2, PlayStation 3, PlayStation 4, PlayStation 5, PlayStation Vita, Wii U, Xbox 360, Xbox One, Xbox Series X/S and Stadia. Ubisoft Anvil is one of the primary game engines used by Ubisoft along with Disrupt, Dunia, and Snowdrop.

== History ==
The engine was originally known as Scimitar. Creative Director of Ubisoft Montreal Patrice Désilets said the engine was written from the ground up for Assassin's Creed in 2007. The engine uses Autodesk's HumanIK middleware to correctly position the character's hands and feet in climbing and pushing animations at run-time. Anvil was improved for Assassin's Creed II to include a full night and day cycle, enhanced draw distance, the same vegetation technology used in Far Cry 2, improved lighting, reflection and special effects, new cloth system, and a new AI and NPC navigation system. Assassin's Creed: Lineage short films made by Hybride Technologies (a post-production VFX studio acquired by Ubisoft) and Ubisoft Digital Arts used assets from Anvil to recreate the environment in which the live actors are filmed. Assassin's Creed: Brotherhood and select versions of Prince of Persia: The Forgotten Sands run on an improved revision of Anvil. Assassin's Creed: Revelations in 2011 was the last game to have been developed on the first generation Anvil. Anvil was also used for the development of Tom Clancy's Rainbow 6: Patriots. However, it got cancelled in 2014 in favor of Tom Clancy's Rainbow Six Siege. The reason for the cancellation was that the game and its engine was developed for the seventh generation of video game consoles which had already become outdated by that time.

In 2012 an updated version was released called AnvilNext, which was developed for Assassin's Creed III and beyond, featuring a number of enhancements. AnvilNext features global illumination and support for a new weather system, which allows for specific weather settings as well as an automatically cycling mode as seen in Assassin's Creed IV: Black Flag. The renderer was rewritten for higher efficiency and support for additional post-processing techniques, enabling up to 2,000 non-playable characters to be rendered in real time (compared to the few hundreds in the previous Anvil engine). AnvilNext adds technology from Far Cry 3 wherein loading screens have been removed when transitioning from travelling on land to navigating the seas. Assassin's Creed Rogue in 2014 was the last game to use AnvilNext.

AnvilNext 2.0 made its debut in 2014 with Assassin's Creed Unity. AnvilNext 2.0 is capable of generating structures in a flexible and automatic manner while following specific design rules and templates, which reduces the amount of time and manual effort required for artists and designers to create an intricate urban environment. Specific landmarks, such as the Notre Dame de Paris, are still designed by hand but now could be rendered at an almost 1:1 ratio to its real-life counterpart. AnvilNext 2.0 also features improved AI for non-playable characters. The engine was rebuilt from the ground up for the game. After Assassin's Creed Unity was released with multiple technical issues at launch, Ubisoft made fixes and improved the engine for Assassin's Creed Syndicate. AnvilNext 2.0 would be further refined for Assassin's Creed Origins and Assassin's Creed Odyssey. Aside from the Assassin's Creed series, AnvilNext 2.0 would be used for other Ubisoft games including Tom Clancy's Rainbow Six Siege, For Honor, Tom Clancy's Ghost Recon Wildlands, and Tom Clancy's Ghost Recon Breakpoint.

Beginning with Assassin's Creed Valhalla in 2020, the engine was rebranded as Ubisoft Anvil. Ubisoft Anvil would also be used for Immortals Fenyx Rising, and Assassin's Creed Mirage. Ubisoft announced they will continue to upscale and develop the engine. An upgraded Anvil engine version is used for Assassin's Creed Shadows, enhancing lighting, introducing breakable props, and implementing a new seasonal system which progresses through time. This version of the engine is also used for Assassin's Creed Black Flag Resynced, a ground-up remake of 2013's Assassin's Creed IV: Black Flag. Prince of Persia: The Sands of Time Remake was announced in September 2020 using Ubisoft Anvil, but was cancelled on 21 January 2026 as part of the restructuring at Ubisoft.

== Features ==
The engine received a variety of significant upgrades, including advanced global illumination, reflection mapping, volumetric lighting, dynamic weather, and dynamic foliage. For Assassin's Creed Unity there has been a similar upgrade, advanced control mechanics with physically based rendering (PBR) being the stand-out addition, enabling materials, objects and surfaces to look and react more realistically to lighting, shading and shadowing. Furthermore, the global illumination system is now more realistic with the addition of volumetric technology, physics-led objects react more realistically, and cloth behaves in a realistic manner on the protagonist, in the environment, and on other characters. The world now supports larger landmasses, more objects, bigger buildings, building interiors that can be accessed without loading screens, and many other additions that enhance visual fidelity, immersion, and the gameplay.

== Games using Ubisoft Anvil ==
=== Scimitar ===
- Assassin's Creed (2007)
- Prince of Persia (2008)
- Shaun White Snowboarding (2008)

=== Anvil ===
- Assassin's Creed II (2009)
- Prince of Persia: The Forgotten Sands (2010)
- Shaun White Skateboarding (2010)
- Your Shape: Fitness Evolved (2010)
- Assassin's Creed Brotherhood (2010)
- Just Dance 3 (Xbox 360 version) (2011)
- Michael Jackson: The Experience (Xbox 360 version) (2011)
- Assassin's Creed: Revelations (2011)
- Your Shape: Fitness Evolved 2012 (2011)

=== AnvilNext ===
- Assassin's Creed III (2012)
- Assassin's Creed III: Liberation (2012)
- Assassin's Creed IV: Black Flag (2013)
- Assassin's Creed Freedom Cry (2013)
- Assassin's Creed Rogue (2014)

=== AnvilNext 2.0 ===
- Assassin's Creed Unity (2014)
- Assassin's Creed Syndicate (2015)
- Tom Clancy's Rainbow Six Siege (2015)
- Steep (2016)
- For Honor (2017)
- Tom Clancy's Ghost Recon Wildlands (2017)
- Assassin's Creed Origins (2017)
- Assassin's Creed Odyssey (2018)
- Tom Clancy's Ghost Recon Breakpoint (2019)
- Hyper Scape (2020)
- Riders Republic (2021)
- Tom Clancy's Rainbow Six Extraction (2022)

=== Ubisoft Anvil ===
- Assassin's Creed Valhalla (2020)
- Immortals Fenyx Rising (2020)
- Assassin's Creed Mirage (2023)
- Skull and Bones (2024)
- Assassin's Creed Shadows (2025)
- Assassin's Creed Black Flag Resynced (2026)

=== Cancelled ===
- Tom Clancy's Rainbow 6: Patriots
- Tom Clancy's Ghost Recon Frontline
- Prince of Persia: The Sands of Time Remake
