= Tom Clancy's Rainbow 6: Patriots =

- The original concept box art for the game.
- Developer: Ubisoft Montreal (Note: Additional support by Red Storm Entertainment and Ubisoft Toronto.)
- Publisher: Ubisoft
- Director: David Sears
- Designers: Philippe Therien; Jean-Sebastian Decant
- Writers: Richard Rouse III; David Sears
- Series: Tom Clancy's Rainbow Six
- Engine: Anvil
- Platforms: PlayStation 3; PlayStation 4; Windows; Xbox 360; Xbox One
- Release: Cancelled
- Genres: First-person shooter, tactical shooter
- Modes: Single-player, multiplayer

Tom Clancy's Rainbow 6: Patriots was a tactical first-person shooter video game and part of the Tom Clancy's Rainbow Six series. It was announced on the cover of the December 2011 issue of Game Informer. The game was to be published by Ubisoft, and was developed by the company's Montreal studio, with additional development by Ubisoft Toronto and Red Storm Entertainment. Due to the death of Tom Clancy in October 2013, concern was raised that Patriots would be the final game credited with his name; Ubisoft has since stated that they will continue to apply Tom Clancy's name on future Tom Clancy titles, out of respect for the late author.

Patriots was cancelled in 2014 and Ubisoft shifted development to a new Rainbow Six game titled Siege.

== Plot ==
Team Rainbow is called to New York City to deal with a terrorist group calling itself the 'True Patriots'. Styling themselves as a populist militia group, the True Patriots have taken it upon themselves to act as judge, jury, and executioner on behalf and avenging the alleged victims of what they see as Wall Street corruption.

To complicate the situation, the new leader of Team Rainbow is James Wolfe, a former Navy SEAL who believes ethics are irrelevant in dealing with the True Patriots. As Echo Leader, a man who looks up to Wolfe as a father figure, they must stop the True Patriots at all costs; even at the price of their own personal morality.

== Development ==
After the release of Tom Clancy's Rainbow Six: Vegas 2 (2008), customer data collected by Ubisoft Montreal indicated that most players were either not interested or did not understand the game's plot. In response, the company decided the next Rainbow Six game should have a more relevant narrative. They took inspiration from the concerns of American citizens following the 2008 financial crisis, and envisioned a world in which disparate paramilitary groups joined together to try and overthrow the United States government. Creative director David Sears commented: "Our enemies are inspired by these paramilitary groups, political radicals who we see all over YouTube, and former military men and women who have valiantly served their country but then return home and feel disenfranchised and forgotten. They don't return as heroes, and they feel like they have been neglected. These are the people who would join a movement like our terrorist group." Canadian filmmaker Érik Canuel and professional screenwriters were brought on to storyboard the game's narrative.

After finding "reason to believe that someone may leak [their] preliminary target gameplay footage", Ubisoft chose to pre-maturely announce the game through a trailer on November 4, 2011. It was stressed that the trailer showed a pre-rendered concept created in 2010 of what a level in the final game might appear like, rather than footage of any current game build.

In March 2012, it was announced that creative director David Sears, narrative director Richard Rouse III, lead designer Philippe Therien, and animation director Brent George were all removed from the development team. Minimal news on the game appeared until May 2013, when GameStop removed Patriots from their database of upcoming games and cancelled all pre-orders.

At E3 2013, Ubisoft confirmed that the game remained in development, but would now be produced for eighth generation consoles. It had also been confirmed that players would also be able to play as the True Patriots in some capacity.

On June 9, 2014, it was announced that Patriots and its concept was scrapped. Instead, Tom Clancy's Rainbow Six Siege was announced as its replacement. The game was later released on December 1, 2015.
