= Skull and Bones (video game) =

2024 video game

- Developer: Ubisoft Singapore (Note: Additional work by Ubisoft Belgrade, Ubisoft Berlin, Ubisoft Chengdu, Ubisoft Kyiv, Ubisoft Montreal, Ubisoft Mumbai, Ubisoft Paris, Ubisoft Philippines, Ubisoft Pune, and Ubisoft Shanghai)
- Publisher: Ubisoft
- Directors: Elisabeth Pellen; Juen Yeow Mak
- Producer: Karl Luhe
- Designers: Simon Lemay-Comtois; Guhem Marin; Andy Tan
- Programmers: Yvan Laval; Jussi Markkanen
- Artists: Franco Perez; Andie Sulistio; Kobe Sek; Wil Wells
- Writers: Joel Janisse; Axel Droxler; Pascal Trottier
- Composers: Tom Holkenborg; Stephen Lukach
- Engine: Ubisoft Anvil
- Platforms: Microsoft Windows; PlayStation 5; Xbox Series X/S
- Release: February 16, 2024
- Genre: Action-adventure
- Modes: Single-player, multiplayer

Skull and Bones is a 2024 action-adventure game developed by Ubisoft Singapore and published by Ubisoft. The game revolves around piracy and naval warfare with a fantastical setting in East Africa and Southeast Asia during the late 17th century, the peak of the historical Golden Age of Piracy. It was released for PlayStation 5, Windows, and Xbox Series X/S on February 16, 2024, after multiple delays and difficulties during development, to mixed reviews from critics.

== Gameplay ==
Skull and Bones was marketed as a tactical action game set in an open world environment and played from a third-person perspective. Players take control of a minimally customizable pirate ship (which has a stamina bar, limiting movement speed), and may choose to sail the Indian Ocean on a single-player campaign, or gather up to five other players to ally in limited player versus player gameplay in Disputed Waters. Players must have a treasure map in order to engage in PvP.

Wind positioning can be assessed to gain an advantage in battle. Players may collect additional ships throughout the game, such as sloops-of-war, frigates, and brigantines, whose weapons include mortars, broadside cannons, and rockets. Ships can be charged into with brute force and boarded by NPC crew but not the player character. The rate of inflicted damage is gauged by the health bar. A core component is the multiplayer mode Loot Hunt, where two groups of players are challenged in treasure hunting to further accumulate their riches. Each given ship's crow's nest is scalable for use as a lookout point, and spyglasses are available. Another large part of the game is plundering Forts and Settlements.

== Plot ==
The game's narrative begins on 6 August 1695, (Note: In-game letters indicate that the game is set in 1695 and the intro on 6 August.) when the player Captain is ambushed by the British Trading Alliance while escorting a pirate convoy in the Indian Ocean. Losing their ship in the ensuing battle, the Captain is rescued by fellow pirate Asnah Yatim, who volunteers to serve as their first mate and advises them to head for the pirate den of Sainte-Anne. There, the Captain finds work for the English pirate kingpin John Scurlock, who is locked in a struggle with the French Compagnie Royale and its allied East African Clan of Fara for control of the Red Isles' lucrative trade routes. The Captain defeats Scurlock's arch-nemesis Francis Caradec, an elite Compagnie captain, only to discover that Scurlock had intended to use them as expendable bait, and that he had previously sold out the pirate den of Lanitra to the Compagnie after being left out of fellow kingpin Uricko Freeman's lucrative Schaduw heist. The Captain leaves Scurlock's service to answer a call from East Indies kingpin Admiral Rahma for aid in her rebellion against the Dutch Merchant Company. The Captain battles the forces of the DMC and their puppet regime in the Dominion of Rempah, ultimately defeating Rahma's arch-nemesis Karel von Kinckel and avenging his murder of Rempah's captive Sultana.

== Development and release ==
Skull and Bones is the first video game led by developer Ubisoft Singapore, which drew inspiration from the naval battles of Assassin's Creed IV: Black Flag. The game began development in 2013, being initially envisioned as an expansion of Assassin's Creed IV: Black Flag, then an MMO spinoff title under the name Black Flag Infinite. It was then spun off as an independent project, in part due to its initial technology becoming outdated.

According to a Kotaku report, the game underwent multiple changes in direction and scope during development, exceeding its budget multiple times. Initially set in the Caribbean, it was moved to the fantastical Hyperborea, then finally East Africa and Southeast Asia. Gameplay was redesigned multiple times, focusing variously on naval exploration and ship-to-ship combat, before both were scrapped in favor of land-based survival elements inspired by games like Rust. Developers contacted by journalist Ethan Gach attributed these difficulties to conflicting ideas, management issues, and lack of consistent direction. The project reportedly cost Ubisoft $200 million.

The game was revealed during Ubisoft's press conference at E3 2017. It was confirmed for Microsoft Windows, PlayStation 4, and Xbox One, with enhancements for PlayStation 4 Pro and Xbox One X. Alongside the game, Ubisoft Singapore announced the "Keepers of the Code" program, designed to allow players to aid in the fine-tuning of its live-service aspects.

In 2017, the artistic direction for the game's entire pirate universe, including flags, tattoos, iconography, and compositions, was commissioned from French artist Bruno Michaud of BMD Design.

Originally set to be released in Q3/Q4 2018, the game was later delayed into 2019, and again to sometime after March 2020. On a call with investors in October 2019, Ubisoft CEO Yves Guillemot confirmed that the game had been pushed back to at least the 2021–2022 fiscal year.

In September 2020, it was revealed that while development was continuing, a "new vision" for the game had emerged, which resulted in release delays as more development time was needed. It was also stated that additional Ubisoft Studios, such as Ubisoft Berlin, were co-developing the game alongside Ubisoft Singapore.

In May 2021, Ubisoft announced a subsequent delay to the 2022–2023 fiscal year. Later that July, Kotaku reported that the game could not be canceled due to receiving large subsidies from the Singapore government.

In July 2022, the company revealed a November 8 release date for the game, and that the game would launch on the PlayStation 5 and Xbox Series X/S (replacing the PlayStation 4 and Xbox One). In September 2022, Ubisoft announced that the release was pushed back to March 9, 2023. In January 2023, Ubisoft delayed the game to the 2023–2024 fiscal year due to the underperformance of recent launches. However, new footage for the game was released. A closed beta was released on August 25, 2023. In October 2023, it was announced that the game would be released in early 2024. At The Game Awards 2023, the final release date of February 16, 2024, was revealed.

Guillemot justified the $70 price tag of Skull and Bones by emphasizing its status as a "quadruple-A game", despite incorporating live-service elements like an in-game store, battle pass, seasonal events, and premium currency. The game reportedly cost $200 million in its decade-long development and Ubisoft did not expect it to break even.

== Related media ==
It was announced in early 2019 that Ubisoft was partnering with Atlas Entertainment to adapt Skull and Bones into a television show. It will be executive produced by Danielle Kreinik, Jason Altman, Andy Horwitz, Richard Suckle and Amanda Segel, with Segel slated to write the pilot episode.

== Reception ==
Reception

Aggregate score
| Aggregator | Score |
|---|---|
| Metacritic | (PC) 58/100 (PS5) 59/100 (XSXS) 63/100 |

Review scores
| Publication | Score |
|---|---|
| Digital Trends | 2.5/5 |
| Eurogamer | 2/5 |
| Famitsu | 30/40 |
| Game Informer | 7.5/10 |
| GameSpot | 4/10 |
| GamesRadar+ | 2.5/5 |
| Hardcore Gamer | 4/5 |
| IGN | 7/10 |
| PC Gamer (US) | 68/100 |
| PCGamesN | 4/10 |
| Push Square | 7/10 |
| The Guardian | 3/5 |
| VideoGamer.com | 7/10 |

=== Critical reception ===
Skull and Bones received "mixed or average" reviews, according to review aggregator website Metacritic. In Japan, four critics from Famitsu gave the game a total score of 30 out of 40.

=== Sales ===
In the United Kingdom, Skull and Bones debuted at 4th place in the weekly boxed charts. The game's sales were less than a quarter of Sea of Thieves, when it launched in 2018.

According to Tom Henderson of Insider Gaming, the game had accumulated around 850,000 players (including those who played using the free trial) by February 22, 2024.

=== Awards ===
Following E3 2017, Skull and Bones was nominated for Game Critics Awards' Best Original Game and Best Online Multiplayer awards. It was nominated for Outstanding Animated Character in an Episode or Real-Time Project at the 21st Visual Effects Society Awards.
