= Assassin's Creed Black Flag Resynced =

2026 video game

- Developer: Ubisoft Singapore (Note: Original game developed by Ubisoft Montreal; additional work by Ubisoft Barcelona, Ubisoft Belgrade, Ubisoft Bordeaux, Ubisoft Bucharest, Ubisoft Chengdu, Ubisoft Da Nang, Ubisoft India (inclusive of Ubisoft Pune and Ubisoft Mumbai), Ubisoft Kyiv, Ubisoft Montpellier, Ubisoft Philippines, Ubisoft Quebec, Ubisoft Shanghai and Ubisoft Sofia.)
- Publisher: Ubisoft
- Directors: Richard Knight; Paul Fu
- Writer: Darby McDevitt
- Composers: Brian Tyler; Stephen Lukach
- Series: Assassin's Creed
- Engine: Ubisoft Anvil
- Platforms: PlayStation 5; Windows; Xbox Series X/S
- Release: July 9, 2026
- Genre: Action-adventure
- Mode: Single-player

Assassin's Creed Black Flag Resynced is a 2026 action-adventure game developed primarily by Ubisoft Singapore and published by Ubisoft. A remake of the 2013 game Assassin's Creed IV: Black Flag, originally developed by Ubisoft Montreal, it was released for PlayStation 5, Windows, and Xbox Series X/S on July 9, 2026. Resynced acts as the fifteenth main installment in the Assassin's Creed series, with its modern day story continuing the story arc that began in Assassin's Creed Shadows.

== Gameplay ==
Assassin's Creed Black Flag Resynced is a remake of the 2013 game Assassin's Creed IV: Black Flag. Like the original, Resynced is set in the Caribbean during the later years of the Golden Age of Piracy and follows pirate Edward Kenway, combining on-foot exploration with ship-based traversal and naval combat.

Built in the latest iteration of the Ubisoft Anvil engine, the remake emphasizes a solo adventure and character-driven experience rather than role-playing elements. It retains the original game's overall world structure while featuring rebuilt character models and environments, along with changes to combat, stealth, parkour, and naval gameplay. Changes to movement and mission design include back ejects, side ejects, a manual crouch option, and revised tailing and eavesdropping missions in which detection no longer automatically results in failure, though the ability to replay older missions has been removed entirely. Combat was revised around more precise parries and shorter combo chains, but swords remain the primary means of combat, as the Hidden Blade is no longer usable in combat outside of stealth and contextual kills.

Other features include recruitable officers for the Jackdaw, expanded underwater exploration, extra ship customization options, dynamic weather effects that influence ship handling, additional story content involving figures such as Anne Bonny, Blackbeard, and Stede Bonnet, alongside new sea shanties.

== Development ==
In June 2024, Ubisoft chief executive officer Yves Guillemot said that the company had several remakes of older Assassin's Creed titles in development. Numerous reports highlighted the existence of an Assassin's Creed IV: Black Flag remake. In September 2025, French outlet Jeux Vidéo Magazine reported that the remake was targeting a March 2026 release. In December, a Black Flag remake was listed on the PEGI rating board website. Insider Gaming called the Black Flag remake "the worst-kept secret in gaming".

Ubisoft publicly acknowledged the project on March 4, 2026, in a franchise update written by Jean Guesdon, the company's head of content. The post included artwork bearing the title Assassin's Creed: Black Flag Resynced.

The remake was developed primarily by Ubisoft Singapore. 15 Ubisoft studios worked on Assassin's Creed Black Flag Resynced, including its Belgrade studio that was closed in June 2026, and Ubisoft Barcelona, which laid off the entire team after release.

=== Gameplay design ===
Ubisoft sought to distinguish Assassin's Creed Black Flag Resynced as an action-adventure game over recent entries that leaned into RPG mechanics. Black Flag Resynced includes a fully customizable HUD with a number of presets depending on player preference. By default, players see enemy health and defense bars which Ubisoft chose to ensure players understand the new defense mechanics. A "Minimal" HUD setting displays only essential information like health and interaction prompts while a "Simple" setting gives aid for combat and navigation.

=== Writing ===
Darby McDevitt, lead scriptwriter on the original Black Flag, returned to write two new scenes for Black Flag Resynced and amend an existing one. Ubisoft wanted to remain faithful to McDevitt's original vision. The team didn't feel the need to alter Kenway's introduction to explain him having athletic parkour abilities as a pirate. They wanted to explore the theme of greed further in Black Flag Resynced. A new scene between Kenway and his wife Caroline was added to deepen the character's personal journey and Blackbeard and Stede Bonnet get expanded arcs. The Freedom Cry DLC has been removed in Black Flag Resynced with the game instead being "fully focused on Edward's adventures in the Caribbean" according to Paul Fu. Creative director Jean Guesdon described it as a "game full of light" taking place "under the bright Caribbean sky" with a "sense of escapism". Modern day sections from the original Black Flag set in the Abstergo Entertainment offices have been removed and replaced with new sequences delving into Edward's memories. Guedon said that, "back then in 2013, the present day reflected where the franchise was at" in a moment of transition and needed to be changed to better reflect the modern Assassin's Creed. The 'What if?' scenarios for Kenway replace the older Abstergo sections, similar to rifts in Assassin's Creed Shadows (2025) but are more narrative-driven.

=== Technology ===
==== Graphics ====
Assassin's Creed Black Flag Resynced was developed in Ubisoft's in-house Anvil engine for ninth generation consoles and PC with technology originally developed for Assassin's Creed Shadows. Assassin's Creed IV: Black Flag was developed as a cross-generation title for seventh and eighth generation consoles. The Xbox One and PlayStation 4 versions received a resolution bump to a respective 900p and 1080p resolution from 720p on the previous generation consoles. Ubisoft rejected suggestions that Black Flag Resynced is a remaster, instead considering it a full remake that has been rebuilt from the ground up. Assassin's Creed Black Flag Resynced contains no code from the original 2013 game. While Black Flag Resynced has been built from scratch with the modern Anvil engine, Ubisoft still sought to maintain the original game's visual identity. Black Flag Resynced incorporates modern rendering techniques such as physically based rendering which was not commonly supported in 2013 when the original game released. PBR simulates the properties of real materials such as roughness and depth with parallax occlusion maps and materials more realistically react to lighting and shadowing. The new PBR pipeline required rebuilding assets to be physically based from scratch rather than simply upscaling the original game's assets that weren't created with PBR in mind. Black Flag Resynced uses higher resolution textures, more geometrically detailed character models and increased draw distances. It utilizes the engine's Micropolygon and Atmos technologies, first introduced in Assassin's Creed Shadows. The Anvil engine's Micropolygon virtualized geometry system handles LOD transitions automatically, much like Nanite in Unreal Engine 5. With Micropolygon, artists can make high-quality assets that can be automatically lowered in texture resolution and geometric detail rather than creating multiple versions of the same asset that are swapped in and out for different detail levels. The significant increase in polygon counts brought by Micropolygon necessitated Ubisoft make improvements to their TAA solution and increase internal resolutions to avoid geometric flicker.

Character rendering was modernised such as shading on character skin using subsurface scattering for added realism. The strand-based hair system developed for Assassin's Creed Shadows returns and has been expanded. Ubisoft discovered issues with the hair system in Shadows for how it handled blonde hair. Shading and lighting changes were made for the system for Black Flag Resynced to properly handle blonde hair that is more common is Black Flag Resynced's Caribbean setting than the Japan setting of Shadows. Loading screens from the original when anchoring in a major city have been removed in Black Flag Resynced.

To better accommodate the dynamic time of day cycle in the game, ray traced global illumination (RTGI) was used for indirect diffused lighting instead of pre-calculated lighting to allow more natural color bleeding with interiors being more accurately lit based on the outdoor lighting. RTGI eliminates issues with light bleeding throw walls with Ubisoft taking inspiration from id Software's high performance RTGI solution for Doom: The Dark Ages. Accordingly, Ubisoft retooled their pipeline to reduce the cost of RTGI from Shadows. The use of ray traced specular reflections have been expanded from Shadows across a broader range of hardware. Their resolution was lowered to a quarter of the primary resolution while a fallback to cube maps exists for distant water to avoid excessively long rays. Performance modes on consoles still make use of traditional screen-space reflections and cube maps. The PC version offers options for diffuse-only or diffuse and specularity in ray tracing and more inclusive ray tracing BVH structures.

On PlayStation 5, Assassin's Creed Black Flag Resynced offers three graphical modes, each outputting 4K resolution using TAAU. The Performance mode targets 60 frames per second with a 1080p internal resolution and the Fidelity mode targets 30 frames per second at 1440p internally. A Balanced mode at 1260p internally targeting 40 frames per second is available when the console is connected to a 120Hz VRR display. The Fidelity and Balanced modes feature RTGI and ray traced reflections while the Performance mode only features RTGI. The Fidelity and Balanced modes feature RTGI and ray traced reflections while the Performance mode is limited to RTGI. Nicolas Lopez, technical architect at Ubisoft Montréal, said that Ubisoft "really squeezed the PS5 as much as we could". Black Flag Resynced is enhanced on PlayStation 5 Pro, bringing "a no-compromise experience with advanced ray tracing performance" according to Lopez. All three graphical modes on PlayStation 5 Pro feature both ray traced global illumination and ray traced specular reflections. The resolution of ray traced reflections is increased on PlayStation 5 Pro. PlayStation 5 Pro is the only console to support strand-based hair rendering. This allows hair to exhibit more natural motion and response to weather conditions like wind. Strand-based hair is used for all characters in cutscenes across all three graphical modes on PlayStation 5 Pro but is only available during gameplay in the Fidelity mode. Black Flag Resynced includes Sony's second generation PlayStation Spectral Super Resolution (PSSR) for upscaling to a 4K output resolution.

Xbox Series X is a feature match for PlayStation 5 with the same settings in the respective Performance, Fidelity and Balanced modes. For the weaker Xbox Series S, Ubisoft aimed for a closer visual alignment with the Series X after Shadows received criticism for its significant cuts in presentation. Xbox Series S features only a single 30 FPS mode that is upscaled to a 1620p output resolution. It features ray traced global illumination but no option for ray traced reflections like the 30 FPS quality modes on other consoles due to the console's memory constraints. Ubisoft aggressively lowered RTGI resolution for it to run on Series S rather than eliminating it entirely like Shadows did for Series S.

==== Animation ====
Animation in Black Flag Resynced was reworked from the original game to accommodate smoother flow between combat moves. Ubisoft incorporated diegetic clues for the player during combat through animation; for instance, an enemy's hat or headpiece will fall of when their defense has been broken. Paying attention to enemy animations during combat with visual feedback disabled "can turn combat into a more instinct driven challenge". Parkour animations in Black Flag Resynced build upon those created for recent Assassin's Creed titles like Assassin's Creed Shadows (2025). While keeping Edward Kenway's classic moves from the original game, the movement has been tweaked to flow more naturally between jumps, vaults and swings. Landing animations have been refined so Edward is able to recover more quickly from drops, making movement more continuous by removing the character's sense of heaviness in the original. New footage using modern motion capture technology was filmed to create more detailed facial animations for Kenway. Ubisoft wanted to preserve the original performances from the 2013 game. The old motion capture data from the original game was mapped onto more detailed modern animation rigs but "the end result was not great" according to technical director Jussi Markkanen. Additional work was done manually for adding more nuanced micro-expressions on character mouths.

=== Audio ===
Erik-Jon Evangelista served as audio director for Assassin's Creed Black Flag Resynced after previously working as an audio designer for Assassin's Creed IV: Black Flag. Many of the sound assets from the original Black Flag had to be recreated to better take advantage of the modern Anvil engine such as spatial audio using physics-driven Doppler effects. Evangelista didn't want to change Brian Tyler's "iconic" music but wanted to work around some of its limitations such as some tracks being "short and possibly repetitive" when entering combat. He made Tyler's music more reactive to the player's actions during combat such as stabs against enemies.

== Release ==
Ubisoft announced on April 20, 2026, that the game would receive a dedicated reveal presentation on April 23. It released on July 9, 2026, for PlayStation 5, Xbox Series X/S, and Windows. A physical Launch Edition with a 34-page artbook and world map poster is exclusive to Europe.

== Reception ==
=== Critical reception ===
Reception

Aggregate score
Aggregator	Score
Metacritic	(PC) 84/100 (PS5) 84/100 (XSXS) 82/100

Review scores
Publication	Score
Eurogamer	3/5
Game Informer	8.25/10
GameSpot	7/10
GamesRadar+	3.5/5
IGN	9/10
PC Gamer (US)	75/100
Video Games Chronicle	4/5

Assassin's Creed Black Flag Resynced received "generally favorable reviews", according to review aggregator Metacritic. Reviewers praised the remake for retaining the original game's pirate fantasy, Caribbean setting and nautical exploration while substantially updating its presentation. Assessments of whether its revisions to combat, movement and mission design improved the original were more varied.

The open world and ship-based gameplay were among the better-received elements. The Guardian found that the more focused structure strengthened the sense of freedom and praised the pacing, performances and sailing, while Video Games Chronicle highlighted the cast, setting, atmosphere and visual improvements. Game Informer regarded the pirate fantasy as the remake's central strength, although it found that the naval battles could become repetitive. GamesRadar+ similarly praised Edward Kenway, the voice performances and the atmosphere, but considered some of the environments and activities overly faithful to the original. In its technical analysis, Digital Foundry found all three console versions accomplished and regarded the PlayStation 5 Pro version as the strongest.

The revisions to on-foot gameplay prompted contrasting responses. The Guardian considered the expanded combat and officer missions successful and found that removing the tailing missions and Abstergo sequences improved the campaign's focus, although it characterized the solution as uncreative. IGN felt that the revised systems brought the game closer to contemporary standards. Conversely, PC Gamer found that the faster movement reduced the original's sense of weight and intentionality and that the new combat system offered fewer meaningful options. GamesRadar+ described the combat as imprecise and needlessly complicated, while GameSpot argued that the action role-playing systems were poorly suited to the original's stealth-oriented design and limited range of enemies. Eurogamer likewise concluded that many of the remake's improvements were accompanied by drawbacks.

Responses to the new and removed narrative material were also divided. Video Games Chronicle found that the additional missions fitted naturally into the existing story, and Game Informer considered the new material substantial enough to interest returning players. GameSpot praised the expanded roles of Caroline Scott, Edward Thatch and Stede Bonnet, but found the newly introduced characters underdeveloped. GamesRadar+ criticized the omission of the Freedom Cry expansion and changes to several story chapters. These differences informed the reviewers' overall conclusions: Video Games Chronicle considered the remake successful despite questioning whether it was necessary, whereas PC Gamer regarded it as competently made but inessential.

=== Sales ===
During an earnings call on May 20, 2026, Ubisoft chief financial officer Frederick Duguet said that Ubisoft were "very happy" with pre-order numbers for Assassin's Creed Black Flag Resynced and that they rank "among the best titles in the franchise for the first three weeks". Analyst Rhys Elliot of Alinea Analytics said that Steam pre-orders for Black Flag Resynced were 5.39 times higher than the franchise's previous entry, Assassin's Creed Shadows.

On release day, Black Flag Resynced attracted 99,000 concurrent players on Steam, surpassing Assassin's Creed Shadows' record of 64,000 to become the largest debut in the franchise's history. Assassin's Creed Black Flag Resynced surpassed three million copies sold within its first week of release. By its second week, the game had sold over 3.5 million copies.

=== Accolades ===
The game was nominated for "Best Remake/Remaster" at the 2026 Golden Joystick Awards, and "Innovation in Accessibility" at The Game Awards 2026.
