= Tom Clancy's Ghost Recon: Future Soldier =

2012 video game

- Developers: Red Storm Entertainment; Ubisoft Paris; Ubisoft Bucharest (Note: Additional development by Ubisoft Annecy, Ubisoft Montpellier, and Ubisoft Singapore. Microsoft Windows port developed by Ubisoft Kyiv.)
- Publisher: Ubisoft
- Directors: Jean-Marc Geffroy; Eric Couzian
- Producer: Jean-Baptiste Duval
- Designer: Roman Campos-Oriola
- Artist: Xavier Marguis
- Writer: Richard Dansky
- Composers: Tom Salta; Hybrid
- Series: Tom Clancy's Ghost Recon
- Platforms: PlayStation 3, Xbox 360, Microsoft Windows
- Release: PlayStation 3, Xbox 360: NA: May 22, 2012; PAL: May 24, 2012; UK: May 25, 2012; JP: July 5, 2012; Microsoft Windows: NA: June 26, 2012; PAL: June 28, 2012; UK: June 29, 2012; Ghost Recon Trilogy: NA: October 1, 2013
- Genres: Third-person shooter, tactical shooter
- Modes: Single-player, multiplayer

Tom Clancy's Ghost Recon: Future Soldier is a third-person tactical shooter video game developed and published by Ubisoft for the PlayStation 3, Xbox 360 and Microsoft Windows. It was released in May and June 2012. Tom Clancy's Ghost Recon: Future Soldier was announced to be in development by Ubisoft on January 22, 2009. The game has a futuristic take on the Ghost Recon series. The campaign has settings such as Bolivia, Zambia, Nigeria, Pakistan, Russia, and Norway.

== Gameplay ==
Kozak uses a drone to scout out enemies in the Pakistan streets. Here the screen is gray to show the perspective of the streets from the UAV camera.

The game is a third-person cover-based shooter. Pulling the left trigger causes the over-the-shoulder view to zoom in, allowing for more precise aiming. Clicking on the right analog stick causes the game to switch to a first-person camera, which lets the player look down the iron sights. Some cover can be partially destroyed, forcing players to seek other hiding spots. While taking cover, players can be suppressed by machine gun fire, which takes the effect of narrowing and shaking the player's field of vision, making it harder to return fire.

A new feature in the series is adaptive camouflage, which allows the Ghosts to become partially invisible. In the game, it is explained that the processing power doesn't exist yet for the camouflage to keep up with quick movements, so it is only active when the player moves slowly. It's enabled automatically when the player crouches, and disengages when running, firing or taking damage.

During firefights, the player can prioritize up to four targets by marking them, on which squad members will focus fire. Outside of firefights, marking targets prepares for a synchronized takedown, so long as the enemy is still unaware of the team's presence. This mechanic is referred to by the game as "Sync Shot". The player is shown icons signifying when the squad mates have moved into position and taken aim on marked targets. If the player marks up to three targets, the player can either order them to fire, or take aim themselves on one of the targets and fire, at which point the squad mates fire simultaneously. If the player marks four targets, the player must aim at one of the targets and fire in order to take down all four targets. Sync Shot also happens to be the only squad command in this game.

Gunsmith allows extensive customizations of weapons, whereafter the player can test them on a firing range before entering a mission. Parts that can be customized include: optics, triggers, magazines, under-barrel attachments (e.g. foregrip or bipod), side-rail attachments (e.g. aiming laser), gas systems (standard, "over-gassed" for increased fire rate/lower accuracy, or "under-gassed" for decreased fire rate/higher accuracy), barrels, muzzles, stocks and paint (cosmetic only). In single-player, advanced parts are unlocked by completing missions and in-mission achievements (called "challenges"). In multiplayer, players unlock weapons and earn credits as they advance the level of their character. On the Xbox 360, players can use Kinect to customize their weapons through hand gestures and voice commands.

Players have use of drones that can be launched covertly and controlled remotely, hovering or moving over the playing field for a limited distance. The player can leave the drone hovering in the air indefinitely, so long as it is not spotted by the enemy, and switch between normal view and the drone camera view. The player can also order the drone to return. Drones can be spotted by enemies and shot, and if they take enough damage, they must be recalled for repair, which occurs automatically after a short period. The drone has a camera to provide an aerial view. Targets can be marked from the drone view. The drone can also be landed on the ground, at which point it maneuvers on wheels, has its own active camouflage, and a sonic blast that can be activated to disorient enemies.

Another automated element is the War Hound, used only in one single-player mission, which is a heavy walking robot, similar to BigDog, which can be controlled by the player and fires mortar rounds and TV-guided missiles. It can be used as portable cover.

=== Multiplayer ===
The game has various multiplayer modes, including cooperative and competitive game types. Tom Clancy's Ghost Recon: Future Soldier features a fully cooperative campaign, as well as a new survival wave-based mode called Guerilla, which is also playable as a single-player mode. Also featured is competitive multiplayer, with the game types Conflict, Decoy, Saboteur, and Siege and characters-Scout, Engineer and Rifleman. A code is used for full-access online play, and is a one-time use code. Used copies of the game will not have full access to online play. Ubisoft announced that the multiplayer servers would be shut down on September 1, 2022. The date was later delayed to October 1, 2022. This renders several achievements and trophies as unachievable.

=== Downloadable content ===
There are three downloadable content (DLC) packs that have been released: Arctic Strike, Raven Strike and Khyber Strike. They add maps, 6 weapons, 3 campaign missions, and multiplayer Takeover and Stockade modes.

== Plot ==
In 2024, (Note: As revealed during Tom Clancy's Ghost Recon Breakpoint’s Red Patriot expansion content) Joe Ramirez leads a four-man Ghost Recon squad to Nicaragua to disrupt weapons trafficking in the region. As they inspect a convoy they ambushed, a dirty bomb is remotely detonated, killing the team.

In response, Major Scott Mitchell assembles the Ghost Recon team "Hunter" in Fort Bragg, North Carolina, consisting of “Ghost Lead” Captain Cedric Ferguson, Staff Sergeant John Kozak, Master Sergeant Robert "Pepper" Bonifacio, and Sergeant First Class Jimmy "30K" Ellison. Mitchell orders Hunter to rescue an arms dealer named Paez in Sucre, Bolivia who has information about the bomb’s origin. Hunter rescues Paez and proceeds to follow the trail of weapons: First, to a refugee camp in Western Province, Zambia, where they eliminate local warlord Dede Macaba; to Nigeria, where they rescue CIA SAD officer Daniel Sykes from private military company Watchgate; to Peshawar, Pakistan, where they capture Russian arms dealer Katya Prugova; to the Kola Peninsula in Russia, where the team destroys an arms cache at a remote Arctic base; and finally to an airfield in Kaliningrad, where they intercept and destroy a missile guidance system, causing an international incident.

Some time later, a nuclear missile fired from Dagestan impacts London, but the American missile shield destroys the nuclear warhead. The Ghost believes the launch to be the work of a rogue Russian special operations group known as Raven's Rock, of which Prugova was an associate, with ties to Russian ultra-nationalists. Hunter moves into Dagestan to rescue a Georgian Special Forces squad who went to investigate the launch site. During the rescue operation, the team is ambushed by Russian Spetsnaz that have access to high-tech equipment on the same level as the Ghosts. As revealed later, these soldiers are part of the elite “Bodark” (Werewolf) unit, which have sided with Raven's Rock. They continue to challenge Ghosts for the rest of the campaign.

Soon after, Raven’s Rock stages a coup and manages to take over the majority of Russia. although a few loyalist Russian forces opposing the new government are scattered around the country. Hunter heads to northern Russia to secure some drilling ships to supply the loyalists with a steady flow of oil. Afterwards, the team rescues a loyalist general who is the de facto leader of the resistance movement. After destroying artillery attacking the general's forces. When overwhelming Raven's Rock forces pin down the Ghosts, Hunter calls in an airstrike on their position. Kozak is then tasked with a solo operation to rescue the deposed Russian President Volodin from a prison in Siberia. Hunter protects President Volodin in his return to Moscow, and eliminates the Raven's Rock commander coordinating the city's defense, facilitating the loyalists' victory over Raven's Rock.

Major Mitchell sends Hunter on a clandestine operation to eliminate the remaining seven leaders of Raven's Rock. After eliminating six of the seven, the last member, code-named "Ace," uses his influence inside the U.S. government to call off the Ghosts. Ace's gambit, however, backfires; under explicit orders "not to touch him," Hunter does nothing when a train runs over Ace to make his death look like an accident.

== Development ==
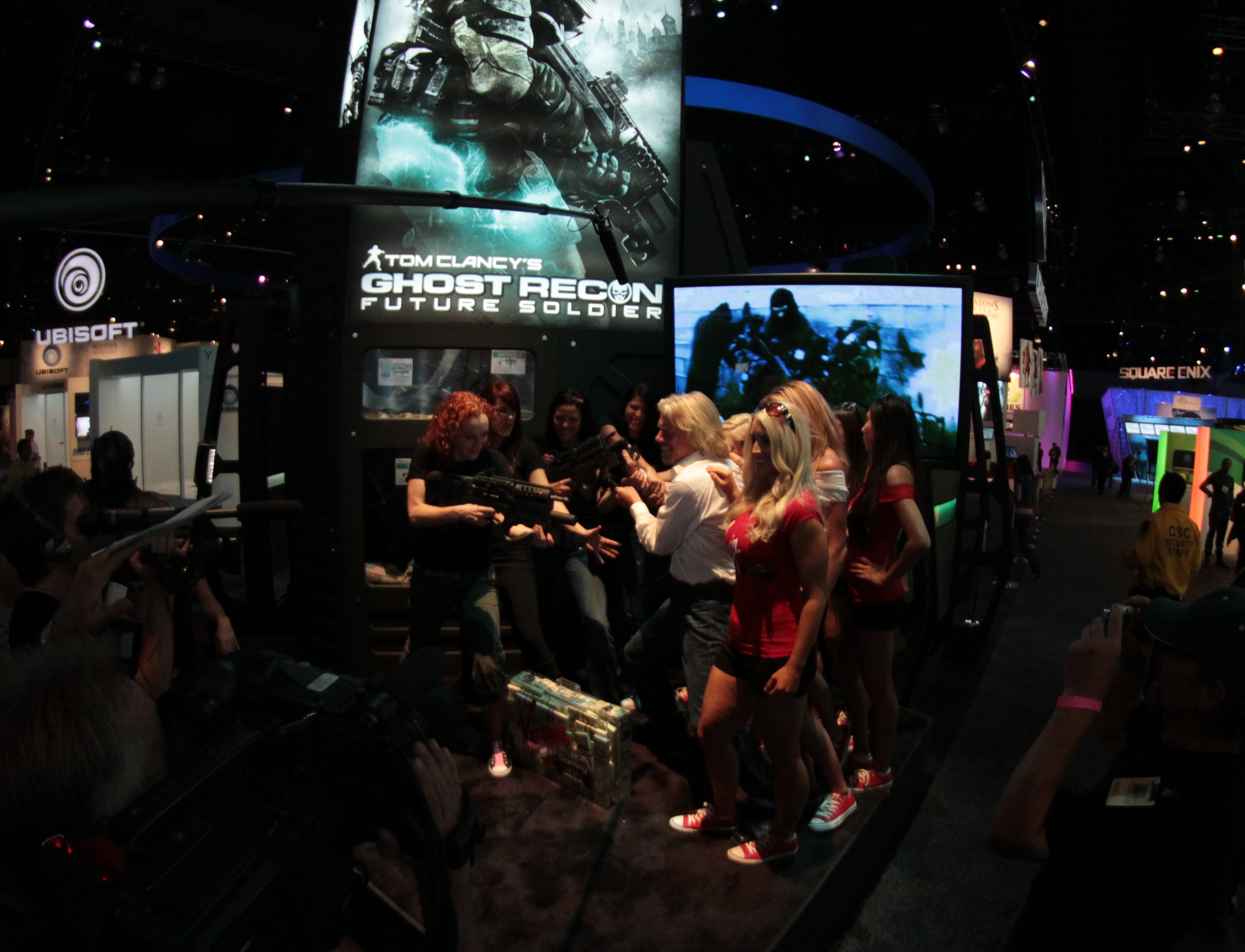
Promotion at E3 2010

In December 2009, "Tom Clancy's Ghost Recon: Future Soldier" was trademarked by Ubisoft, raising speculation that this could be the name for the upcoming Ghost Recon 4. This was subsequently confirmed by an official announcement. The game was developed on a heavily modified version of the YETI engine, implementing global illumination, and ambient occlusion.

The release of Tom Clancy's Ghost Recon: Future Soldier was initially targeted for the 2009–2010 fiscal year; publication was delayed to the 2010–2011 fiscal year, and then to the "March quarter of 2011" in May 2010, and then to the April 2011 – March 2012 fiscal period. The PC version was officially declared as cancelled in December 2011 and replaced by Ghost Recon Online, citing piracy as the main reason. However, on January 10, 2012, the PC version was officially re-announced as being in development along with its console counterparts.

=== Beta ===
On April 19, 2012, a closed multiplayer beta for the PlayStation 3 and Xbox 360 was made available to those who have pre-ordered the game from GameStop, own a copy of Tom Clancy's Splinter Cell: Conviction, or have a PlayStation Plus membership. Some selected users from Uplay were also able to enter the closed beta. No PC multiplayer date was ever set.

== Related media ==
=== Believe in Ghosts miniseries ===
Richard Machowicz, one of the hosts of Deadliest Warrior and the host for Future Weapons, hosted a three-part miniseries titled Believe in Ghosts. Here Machowicz looks at elements in the game and compares them to real life operations performed by special forces.

Episode list
#	Title	Original airdate	Operation	Link
1	"The Deadly Edge"	February 22, 2012	Maersk Alabama hijacking	Video on YouTube
2	"My Weapon Is Me"	March 7, 2012	Operation Neptune Spear	Video on YouTube
3	"Team or Die"	March 14, 2012	Operation Acid Gambit	Video on YouTube

=== Ghost Recon: Alpha ===
In the short live action movie Ghost Recon: Alpha, which is a prequel to the game, a Ghost team (consisting of Pepper, 30k, Chuck, and an unnamed Ghost Leader) was trying to secure a RSM-56 Bulava nuclear warhead. While trying to disarm the warhead, Chuck was shot in the head. Eventually the remaining Ghosts managed to fight off the attacking force, but the warhead was airlifted by a helicopter belonging to an unknown faction. The short movie ends with a view of London set in the time period of the video game.

== Reception ==
Reception

Aggregate scores
Aggregator	Score
GameRankings	(X360) 78.89% (PS3) 78.44% (PC) 66.50%
Metacritic	(X360) 79/100 (PS3) 79/100 (PC) 71/100

Review scores
Publication	Score
GameSpot	(X360) 7.5/10 (PC) 6.5/10
IGN	8.5/10

Tom Clancy's Ghost Recon: Future Soldier received generally positive reviews from critics. Some reviewers, like IGN's, have praised the game's more thoughtful approach to cover-based shooting, scoring the game an 8.5 out of 10. GameSpot gave the game a 7.5 praising the lengthy campaign and multiplayer but criticizing the AI and combat. The PC version suffered from lower ratings. Numerous bugs making the game unplayable, such as the interface ignoring keyboard and mouse inputs, were present in the game at launch. Ghost Recon: Future Soldier on PC had huge issues with online PvP multiplayer due to peer-to-peer system that hosted games on people's computers instead of dedicated/cloud servers. Also, the game was locked at 60 fov as well as 60 fps.
