= The Sims 2 (Nintendo DS video game) =

2005 video game

- Developer: Griptonite Games
- Publisher: Electronic Arts
- Directors: Doug Schilling; Phil Trumbo
- Producers: J.C. Connors; Dan McAuliffe
- Designer: Dan McAuliffe
- Programmer: Scott Perras
- Artist: Tamara Knoss
- Writer: Darby McDevitt
- Composers: Ian Stocker; Kyle Johnson
- Series: The Sims
- Platform: Nintendo DS
- Release: NA: October 24, 2005; EU: November 4, 2005
- Genre: Life simulation
- Mode: Single-player

The Sims 2 is a 2005 life simulation video game developed by Griptonite Games and published by Electronic Arts for the Nintendo DS. Development of the game began following the success of The Sims 2 for personal computers. The handheld versions of The Sims 2 were the final games in the Sims series to be developed by Griptonite following The Sims Bustin' Out and The Urbz: Sims in the City. The game, written by Darby McDevitt, was noted for its dark plot and absurdist humor, and received mixed reviews from critics upon release.

== Gameplay and plot ==
The Sims 2 begins with a character editor where the player selects the Sim's gender, name, and appearance. The Sim is assigned as the manager of the only hotel in the deserted area of the town of Strangetown. The Sim must maintain cleanliness and order in the hotel; from time to time, hotel visitors will make different wishes, which the Sim must fulfill to increase their rating. At the same time, different events will take place in Strangetown and the problems must be solved by the Sim. The town periodically suffers from attacks by aliens who consider the hot and arid surroundings of Strangetown ideal for colonization, since they are afraid of water, requiring the Sim to stop this threat. In some situations, the Sim will have to engage in battle with supernatural creatures.

The gameplay is tied to the need to earn money in different ways, which can be obtained by completing mini-quests, collecting items in the desert, and doing odd jobs; if the Sim fulfills all the desires and whims of hotel visitors, they will pay more. An equally important element of the game is the need to satisfy the basic needs of the Sim for food and hygiene; if these are ignored, the Sim will have a nervous breakdown and will not be able to complete quests and maintain dialogues at the proper level. As the plot develops, the Sim unravels new secrets of the town. The game offers mini-games and the ability to create music and draw pictures.

== Development and release ==
The Nintendo DS version of The Sims 2, like other versions for game consoles and handheld devices, was developed following the success of the original version for personal computers. Despite sharing a title, the Nintendo DS version is a reimagined linear progression game with graphics adapted to run on a smaller device. The Nintendo DS version was developed by Griptonite Games, and the handheld versions of The Sims 2 would be the final games in the franchise developed by them.

When developing the previous three Game Boy Advance games, Griptonite strived to make their plots as strange as possible, introducing dark and disturbing plots featuring an abundance of dark and absurdist humor, and this bar was raised with each new subsequent project. According to producer J.C. Connors, the Nintendo DS version ended up with the strangest plot-based humor of any game. However, some ideas were not approved by Electronic Arts; for example, the developers wanted to introduce the concept that the player controls the game character from the point of view of a parasitic amoeba that controls the character's brain. Lead writer Darby McDevitt suggested using the hotel as the main setting, drawing inspiration from the TV series Fawlty Towers. McDevitt later mentioned that working on strange stories for The Sims games allowed him to gain writing experience for future successful game projects. Connors noted that the plot was inspired by the novels of H.P. Lovecraft and Stephen King, especially the novel It, but also noted that the PC version itself offered mysterious background stories that aroused widespread interest among fans of the game, specifically mentioning the disappearance of Bella Goth.

The soundtrack for The Sims 2 was jointly created by composers Ian Stocker of Ian Stocker Sound Design and Kyle Johnson of Moontech Studios, who collaborated online to compose music for the Game Boy Advance and Nintendo DS versions. Ian had previously been an independent composer and director contracting with Griptonite when he was briefed to compose the music for The Sims 2. To reflect the game's setting, Stocker created Western-style compositions featuring live guitar performances by Johnson. Stocker and Johnson collaborated while respectively living in San Francisco and Santa Barbara. Initially, Stocker composed the melody using the Buzz and Impulse Tracker programs, then Johnson accompanied it with a guitar performance, attaching it to the track using Audio Hijack Pro. While working on the opening theme, Johnson and Stocker recorded a melody styled after "Uncle Albert/Admiral Halsey". Stocker not only created melodies, but also used the guitar to create various sound effects. Due to the technical limitations of the Nintendo DS and especially the Game Boy Advance, Stocker was unable to include a full soundtrack in the game, so the tracks were recorded in 10-20 second sample format, which were then used to recreate the tracks.

The Sims 2 was released in North America on October 24, 2005, and in Europe on November 4.

== Reception ==
Reception

Aggregate score
Aggregator	Score
Metacritic	70/100

Review scores
Publication	Score
Game Informer	6.8/10
IGN	8.2/10
Nintendo Power	5.5/10
Nintendo World Report	8/10

The Sims 2 was met with "mixed or average" reviews according to review aggregator Metacritic.

Vincent Anderson of Nintendo World Report concluded that the abundance of micromanagement was satisfying without becoming overwhelming. Craig Harris of IGN compared the game's structure to Animal Crossing and considered the plot too linear, though he praised the accessible interface.

The strangeness of the handheld versions of The Sims 2 was discussed in a retrospective piece by Leah J. Williams of Kotaku. Users on Reddit have noted the game's empty and oppressive atmosphere and abundance of cruel humor and ambiguous scenes, such as when the player character, on behalf of a mobster, must bury a wriggling suitcase. Some users complained of psychologically traumatic experiences, while others appreciated the dark humor.
