= Assassin's Creed IV: Black Flag =

2013 video game

- Developer: Ubisoft Montreal (Note: Additional work by Ubisoft Annecy, Ubisoft Bucharest, Ubisoft Quebec, Ubisoft Singapore and Ubisoft Sofia.)
- Publisher: Ubisoft
- Directors: Jean Guesdon; Ashraf Ismail; Damien Kieken
- Producer: Martin Schelling
- Designers: Eric Baptizat; Jean-Sebastien Decant
- Artist: Raphael Lacoste
- Writer: Darby McDevitt
- Composer: Brian Tyler
- Series: Assassin's Creed
- Engine: AnvilNext
- Platforms: PlayStation 3; Xbox 360; Wii U; PlayStation 4; Windows; Xbox One; Nintendo Switch; Google Stadia
- Release: October 29, 2013: PlayStation 3, Xbox 360; WW: October 29, 2013 Wii U; NA: October 29, 2013; AU: November 21, 2013; EU: November 22, 2013 PlayStation 4; NA: November 15, 2013; AU: November 29, 2013; EU: November 22, 2013 Windows; NA: November 19, 2013; AU: November 21, 2013; EU: November 22, 2013 Xbox One; WW: November 22, 2013 Nintendo Switch; WW: December 6, 2019 Google Stadia; WW: September 14, 2021
- Genres: Action-adventure, stealth
- Modes: Single-player, multiplayer

Assassin's Creed IV: Black Flag is a 2013 action-adventure game developed by Ubisoft Montreal and published by Ubisoft. It is the sixth major installment in the Assassin's Creed series. Its historical timeframe precedes that of Assassin's Creed III (2012), but its modern-day sequences succeed III's own. Black Flag was originally released for PlayStation 3, Xbox 360, and Wii U in October 2013 and a month later for PlayStation 4, Windows, and Xbox One. It was later ported to the Nintendo Switch as part of The Rebel Collection alongside Assassin's Creed Rogue in December 2019. The game was released for Google Stadia in September 2021.

The plot is set in a fictional history of real-world events and follows the millennia-old struggle between the Assassins, who fight to preserve peace and free will, and the Templars, who desire peace through control. The framing story is set in the 21st century and depicts the player as an employee of Abstergo Entertainment (a company used as a front by the modern-day Templars), who is manipulated into uncovering secrets related to the Assassin–Templar conflict and the precursor race known as the First Civilization. The main story is set in the West Indies during the Golden Age of Piracy from 1715 to 1722, and follows notorious Welsh pirate Edward Kenway, grandfather of Assassin's Creed III protagonist Ratonhnhaké:ton / Connor and father of antagonist Haytham Kenway, as he searches for fortune and a mythical location called the Observatory, which is sought by both the Assassins and the Templars. A major plot element concerns the attempted establishment of an independent Pirate republic in the Caribbean.

Unlike previous games, gameplay elements focus more on the ship-based exploration of the seamless open world map, while also retaining the series' third-person land-based exploration, melee combat, and stealth system. Multiplayer also returns, albeit with only land-based modes and settings. The game's setting spans the West Indies with the three main cities of Havana, Nassau, and Kingston, along with numerous islands, sunken ships, and forts. Players have the option to harpoon large sea animals and hunt land animals. For the first time in the series, naval exploration is a major part of an Assassin's Creed game, where Edward captains the Jackdaw, a brig he captures from a Spanish fleet in an early game mission. A number of downloadable content (DLC) packs were released to support Black Flag, including Assassin's Creed Freedom Cry, a story expansion that was later made available as a standalone game in 2014. Set over a decade after Black Flag's main campaign, Freedom Cry follows Adéwalé, Edward's former quartermaster who became an Assassin.

Black Flag is generally considered one of the greatest video games ever made. It received critical acclaim and became one of the best-selling games of 2013, with over 11 million copies sold as of 2014. Critics praised the open world gameplay, naval combat, side-quests, graphics, narrative, characters, and pirate theme. However, the modern-day story and combat received a slightly more mixed response, while criticism fell on aspects of the historical story missions which were considered repetitive. The game received several awards and nominations, including winning the Spike VGX 2013 award for Best Action Adventure Game. It was followed by Assassin's Creed Rogue and Assassin's Creed Unity in November 2014. A remake, Assassin's Creed Black Flag Resynced, was released on July 9, 2026.

== Gameplay ==
Assassin's Creed IV: Black Flag is an action-adventure, stealth game set in an open world environment and played from a third-person perspective. The game features three main cities: Havana, Kingston, and Nassau, which reside under Spanish, British, and pirate influence, respectively. In addition, locations like Port-au-Prince and Greater Inagua are used as main story points. It also features 50 other individual locations to explore, including atolls, sea forts, Mayan ruins, sugar plantations, and underwater shipwrecks, with a 60/40 balance between land and naval exploration. The game was designed to be more open than previous Assassin's Creed titles, with a map of a large section of the Caribbean from where the smaller, individual locations may be accessed. It also features fewer restrictions for the player compared to Assassin's Creed III, which had very scripted missions and did not give players the freedom to explore until the game was well into its first act. The player will encounter jungles, forts, ruins, and small villages, and can engage, board, and capture passing ships or swim to nearby beaches in a seamless fashion. In addition, the hunting system has been retained from Assassin's Creed III, allowing the player to hunt on land, and fish in the water, with resources gathered used to upgrade equipment via a crafting system.

A new aspect in the game is the Jackdaw, the ship that protagonist Edward Kenway captains. The Jackdaw is upgradeable throughout the game, and is easily accessible to the player when needed. In addition, a new underwater component has been added, allowing players to explore shipwrecks at several marked locations. The player has access to a spyglass, allowing the examination of distant ships, along with their cargo and strength. It can also help determine if an island still has animals to hunt, treasures to find, high points to reach for synchronization or additional side-quests to complete, such as assassinations and naval contracts. An updated form of the recruit system introduced in Assassin's Creed: Brotherhood is present in the game, allowing Edward to recruit crew members. While Kenway's crew will remain loyal to him, they can be promoted to captain acquired ships, and are needed to assist in boarding enemy vessels. They cannot assist in combat or perform long-range assassinations, as in previous games; Ubisoft removed this aspect of the Brotherhood system, believing it allowed players to bypass tense and challenging scenarios too easily.

In the present, at the offices of Abstergo Entertainment—a subsidiary of Abstergo Industries—in Montreal, Quebec, players control an unnamed protagonist from a first-person perspective and engage in modern-day pirating through the exploration of Abstergo's offices, eavesdropping, and hacking, all without combat. "Hacking" minigames, similar to the cluster and glyph puzzles from the previous games, are also present, and completing them uncovers various secrets about Abstergo.

Multiplayer also returns, with new settings and game modes, though it is entirely land-based.

== Synopsis ==
=== Characters ===
The main character of the game is Edward Kenway (Matt Ryan), a Welsh privateer-turned-pirate and eventual member of the Brotherhood of Assassins. Edward is the father of the Colonial Templars Grand Master Haytham Kenway and grandfather of the Assassin Ratonhnhaké:ton, the two of whom are playable characters of Assassin's Creed III. During the game, Edward meets and interacts with several real-life historical figures, including notorious pirates Edward "Blackbeard" Thatch (Note: The character is referred to as "Thatch" in this game, rather than the more common "Teach". "Thatch" is the form of Blackbeard's name used in all primary sources written by people who had actually met the pirate, while "Teach" was the version used in the only newspaper in North America at the time, the Boston News-Letter. See Blackbeard: Early life for more information.) (Mark Bonnar), Benjamin Hornigold (Ed Stoppard), Mary Read (Olivia Morgan), Stede Bonnet (James Bachman), Anne Bonny (Sarah Greene), John Rackham (O-T Fagbenle), and Charles Vane (Ralph Ineson).

=== Setting ===
As is the case in previous Assassin's Creed games, the story is divided into two intertwined halves. One is set in the time of the game's release and the other in a historical setting. Although the modern-day story had previously established that an Animus was required to view ancestor memories, the ending of Assassin's Creed III reveals that Abstergo can now view a host's genetic memories simply by sequencing the host's DNA. As such, the unseen player character is hired by Abstergo Entertainment to investigate a pivotal character in Desmond Miles's ancestry, Edward Kenway; this occurs in 2013. A notorious pirate and privateer operating during the Golden Age of Piracy, Kenway's story is set in the Caribbean and mixes open-ended ship-based exploration with combat and land-based adventures in Cuba, Jamaica, various Caribbean islands, southern Florida, and eastern Mexico, as well as Principe and Charlestown, South Carolina.

=== Plot ===
In 2013, months after Desmond Miles's death in Assassin's Creed III, samples taken from his body allow Abstergo Industries to continue exploring his genetic memories with the Animus's newfound cloud computing abilities. The unnamed player character is hired by Abstergo Entertainment, a subsidiary of Abstergo Industries, to examine the memories of Desmond's ancestor, Edward Kenway, an eighteenth-century pirate. Ostensibly, this is to gather material for an Animus-powered interactive feature film. In reality, Abstergo—the Templars of the modern day—are searching for a First Civilization structure known as the Observatory which Edward interacted with.

Edward's story begins in 1715 when he stumbles into a conspiracy involving high-ranking Templars within the British and Spanish Empires. Under the guise of cleaning up piracy in the Caribbean, they have used their positions to locate the Sage—later identified as Bartholomew Roberts (Oliver Milburn)—the only man who can lead them to the Observatory. This device can monitor anyone anywhere in the world when provided a blood sample, which they intend to use to spy on and blackmail world leaders. Edward inadvertently becomes involved when he kills a rogue Assassin, Duncan Walpole. Seeing an opportunity for profit, Edward takes Walpole's place at a meeting of Templars in Havana, and meets Woodes Rogers (Shaun Dingwall) and Cuban Governor and Templar Grand Master Laureano Torres (Conrad Pla). His recklessness endangers the Assassin Brotherhood, prompting him to pursue the Sage and the conspirators from the Yucatán Peninsula to Jamaica, eventually catching Roberts on the island of Príncipe off of the Central African coast.

Meanwhile, a band of notorious pirates—including Edward "Blackbeard" Thatch, Benjamin Hornigold, and Mary Read (operating under the alias "James Kidd")—dream of a pirate utopia where people are free to live beyond the reach of kings and clergy. Thatch and Hornigold had previously seized control of Nassau and establish a pirate republic, but poor governance, lack of an economy, and disease threaten to collapse the republic. Edward attempts to resolve the dispute but is too late to stop the Templars from exploiting the situation, resulting in Blackbeard being killed by the British, Hornigold joining the Templars, and Mary devoting more time to the Assassin Brotherhood in Tulum. Edward, Rackham, and Charles Vane attempt to locate Roberts, but Rackham betrays the others and leaves them marooned.

Eventually, Edward finds and joins his crew with Roberts' men and uncovers the location of the Observatory. However, Roberts' betrayal leads to Edward's arrest. He is imprisoned in Port Royal, but escapes when Ah Tabai (Octavio Solorio), the Assassin Mentor, infiltrates the prison to rescue Mary Read and Anne Bonny. There, he learns that Rackham and Bonnet have already been hanged while Vane is in prison awaiting execution. Mary dies from complications in her recent childbirth and a disheartened Edward joins the Brotherhood. Chasing down and eliminating Rogers, Roberts, and Torres, Edward seals away the Observatory. He receives a letter informing him of the passing of his wife, Caroline, and the imminent arrival of the daughter he didn't know he had, Jennifer Scott. Edward moves to London, promising Ah Tabai that he will continue fighting the Templars. Years later, Edward attends The Beggar's Opera at the Royal Opera House with Jennifer and Haytham.

In 2013, John Standish, Abstergo Entertainment's information technology manager, persuades the player to investigate supposed Abstergo secrets. Under John's guidance, they hack several Animus terminals and deliver the information to Shaun Hastings (Danny Wallace) and Rebecca Crane (Eliza Schneider), who they know to only be courriers. When the hacks are discovered and the facility is locked down, John instructs the player to access the Animus's core. Juno (Nadia Verrucci) materializes into an incorporeal form but reveals the world is not yet ready for her and that she is unable to possess the player as John intended.

John is then revealed to be a reincarnation of Roberts, and therefore a Sage, and attempts to murder the player to cover up Juno's failed resurrection; he is killed by Abstergo's security and discovered to be the one behind the hacks. It is further revealed that all Sages are reincarnations of Juno's husband Aita. The player is contacted by Rebecca, who reveals herself to be an Assassin. (Note: The player is able to find collectible items scattered throughout both past and present-day game worlds. These items establish the Sage's backstory and are used as a means of communicating with other unidentified agents of the First Civilization.)

== Development ==
In early February 2013, during its quarterly financial call to investors, Ubisoft CEO Yves Guillemot confirmed that the next Assassin's Creed game, due for release some time before April 2014, would feature a new hero, time period, and development team. On February 28, 2013, Ubisoft posted their first promotional picture and cover for their next Assassin's Creed game, following leaked marketing material days before. It announced the title of the game as Assassin's Creed IV: Black Flag and featured an unnamed character holding a flintlock and a sword with a black flag in the background containing the Assassin's symbol with a skull. A reported glitch on the official Assassin's Creed IV website suggested the game will release on next-gen consoles and October 29 as the release date, which was confirmed by the first trailer for the game, released on March 4, 2013 (originally leaked on March 2, 2013, but was quickly pulled by Ubisoft).

Assassin's Creed IV: Black Flag was announced with a cinematic trailer on March 4, 2013. Development began in mid-2011 at Ubisoft Montreal by a separate team from the one on Assassin's Creed III, with additional work done by Ubisoft studios in Annecy, Bucharest, Kyiv, Milan, Montpellier, Singapore and Sofia.

Lead content manager Carsten Myhill stressed away from the sentiment that the sequel should have been a spin-off in the same vein as Assassin's Creed: Brotherhood or Assassin's Creed: Revelations, given the ostensible similarities with Assassin's Creed III. He stated "The whole feeling of the game is completely fresh and new. It will feel very different from Assassin's Creed III. I think it completely warrants the Assassin's Creed IV moniker, not only with the new name and setting but the attitude and the tone of the experience." Assassin's Creed IV is the first main series numbered title to carry a subtitle, a decision which Myhill says was made to clearly distinguish the pirate theme from the rest of the franchise. Director Ashraf Ismail based the game's open world design on Super Mario 64's use of a hub world with pockets of maps full of content.

By utilizing the AnvilNext engine, the development team is able to work with one engine for both the next-gen and current-gen versions of the game, as the AnvilNext engine was designed with next-gen capabilities in mind, while still working on current-gen systems. In addition, each system will have their own intricacies and feature sets, with support for the different controllers and utilizing features specific to each console. The PC version supports Nvidia's TXAA.

In November 2013, Ubisoft financed the exhumation of the remains of the Spanish corsair Amaro Pargo with the aim of reconstructing his face for a possible appearance in Black Flag. This exhumation led to important discoveries on the physiognomy of this mythical corsair.

=== Music ===
Assassin's Creed IV: Black Flag (Original Game Soundtrack) was composed by American composer Brian Tyler, who also composed the soundtrack of the previous Ubisoft title Far Cry 3. Additional compositions and arrangements were provided by Sarah Schachner, Omar Fadel, Steve Davis, Mike Kramer, Jeremy Lamb, Matthew Llewellyn, and Robert Lydecker. The soundtrack was released on Amazon MP3 and iTunes on October 14, 2013. Two other soundtracks have also been released:

- Assassin's Creed IV: Black Flag (Game Soundtrack — Sea Shanty Edition), a second soundtrack containing a set of 16 sea shanties composed by various artists, was released on Amazon MP3 and iTunes on October 29, 2013.
- Assassin's Creed IV: Black Flag (Game Soundtrack — The Complete Edition), a complete soundtrack including the two previous soundtracks as well as the multiplayer soundtrack composed by Joe Henson and Alexis Smith, was released on Amazon MP3 and iTunes on December 2, 2013.
- Assassin's Creed IV: Black Flag (Game Soundtrack — Sea Shanty Edition, Vol. 2), a third soundtrack containing a set of 25 sea shanties composed by various artists, was released on Amazon MP3 and iTunes on June 16, 2014.

The score to the Freedom Cry DLC was composed by French composer Olivier Deriviere. It was recorded at Avatar Studios in New York with La Troupe Makandal, a dedicated group for Haitian music, and at Galaxy Studios in Belgium with the Brussels Philharmonic.

== Marketing and release ==
Assassin's Creed IV: Black Flag was released worldwide for PlayStation 3 and Xbox 360 on October 29, 2013, while the Wii U version was released on October 29, 2013, in North America, November 21, 2013 in Australia, November 22, 2013, in Europe and November 28, 2013, in Japan. The Wii U version in Europe was delayed from its original November 1, 2013 release date. It was announced on March 1, 2013, that the game will also come to the PlayStation 4, and on May 21 that it will release on the Xbox One. Both versions were launch titles, with the PlayStation 4 version releasing on November 15 and 29, 2013 in North America and Europe, respectively, and November 22, 2013, worldwide for Xbox One.

Ubisoft partnered with Sony to bring exclusive content to the PlayStation 3 and PlayStation 4 versions of the game, including three missions featuring the protagonist of Assassin's Creed III: Liberation, Aveline de Grandpré (Amber Goldfarb). The Aveline expansion, which was written by Liberation writer Jill Murray, picks up after the conclusion of her story in Liberation. The content is also available on the PC platform, through the Uplay Gold Edition.

On June 21, 2013, it was announced that the Windows version had been delayed "a few weeks" from its intended release of October 29, 2013. Its new release dates were later revealed to be November 19, 2013, in North America and November 22, 2013, in Europe. Lead designer Jean-Sebastien Decant explained that the delay was caused by the team working on the "master version" first, making sure it works and then proceeding to the other versions. For Black Flag, the PlayStation 3 and Xbox 360 version was the master, before the team adapted it to the other consoles.

On October 31, 2013, Ubisoft announced that the Uplay Passport requirement would be removed from Assassin's Creed IV and all future games. Uplay Passport came with all new copies of the game and was required for accessing multiplayer and Edward's Fleet minigame. Owners of used copies could download Uplay Passport for a fee before the removal.

A Japanese manga adaptation of the game, written by Takashi Yano and illustrated by Kenji Oiwa, began serialization in Shueisha's Jump X magazine on August 10, 2013. The manga however contradicts many parts of the game's actual storyline, despite the manga being an adaptation of the game.

=== Downloadable content ===
On October 8, 2013, Ubisoft announced that a Season Pass would be available for purchase at the launch of the game on PlayStation 3, PlayStation 4, Xbox 360, Xbox One and PC, and would include a single-player story expansion, titled Freedom Cry, and the Kraken Ship pack featuring elements to personalize the Jackdaw, as well as additional single-player and multiplayer elements.

Freedom Cry sees the player take on the role of Adéwalé, a freed slave from Trinidad who became Edward Kenway's quartermaster and later a member of the Assassin Brotherhood during the events of Black Flag. It takes place thirteen years after the ending of Black Flag, by which point Adéwalé has been well-trained in the Assassins' ways. While disrupting Templar operations in the Caribbean, Adéwalé finds himself shipwrecked in Saint-Domingue, where he comes face-to-face with some of the most brutal slavery practices in the West Indies. The story is written by Jill Murray, who also wrote Assassin's Creed III: Liberation. In February 2014, it was announced that Freedom Cry would be released as a standalone title on the PlayStation 3 and PlayStation 4 on February 18, 2014, for North America and February 19, 2014, for Europe. It was later released for the PC on February 25, 2014.

Blackbeard's Wrath and Guild of Rogues both introduce three new characters to Black Flag's multiplayer mode; the former adds Blackbeard, The Jaguar and The Orchid, while the latter features The Shaman, The Siren, and The Stowaway. Blackbeard's Wrath is included in the Season Pass.

Upon the game's original release, the PlayStation 3 and PlayStation 4 versions contained an exclusive DLC, Aveline, also written by Jill Murray. It follows the titular protagonist of Assassin's Creed III: Liberation in a new adventure set years after that game's events. It was later made available on PC, in the Uplay Digital Deluxe Edition and Jackdaw Edition, and on the Nintendo Switch as part of the Rebel Collection. The game was ported to Google Stadia on September 14, 2021.

A Game of The Year version, called the Jackdaw Edition, was released in the UK for sale exclusively on Amazon.co.uk. It was later made available for Xbox One, PlayStation 4 and PC. The edition includes all previously released downloadable content. No comparable editions were created for territories outside of the UK.

== Reception ==
Reception

Aggregate score
Aggregator	Score
Metacritic	(PS3) 88/100 (WIIU) 86/100 (X360) 86/100 (PS4) 83/100 (PC) 84/100

Review scores
Publication	Score
Computer and Video Games	9/10
Destructoid	8.5/10
Edge	9/10
Electronic Gaming Monthly	9.5/10
Eurogamer	9/10
Famitsu	37/40
Game Informer	8.25/10
GameSpot	9/10
GameTrailers	9.2/10
Giant Bomb	4/5
IGN	8.5/10
Joystiq	4/5
PlayStation Official Magazine – UK	8/10
Official Xbox Magazine (US)	9.0/10
PC Gamer (UK)	90%
VideoGamer.com	7/10
The Escapist	5/5

Assassin's Creed IV: Black Flag received "generally favorable" reviews, according to review aggregator website Metacritic, with critics praising the open world gameplay, side-quests, graphics and naval combat. In November 2013, Hardcore Gamer ranked Black Flag as the 70th greatest game of the seventh generation era.

Black Flag was generally praised as superior to Assassin's Creed III, with Game Informer's Joe Juba noting that Ubisoft responded to criticisms the previous game faced and rectified them. CVG's Matt Gilman called the game "a return to form for the franchise," while Mikel Reparaz of Official Xbox Magazine stated that "After weathering the somewhat diminishing returns of Revelations and ACIII, Black Flag is exactly the shot in the arm Assassin's Creed needed." Destructoid's Conrad Zimmerman called the game "Impressive efforts with a few noticeable problems holding it back. Won't astound everyone, but is worth your time and cash". Two days after its release, IGN ranked Black Flag as the 2nd best game in the Assassin's Creed series, only behind Assassin's Creed II.

Several reviewers directed heavy acclaim to the game's open world structure, with the Edge staff declaring that Black Flag "sets new benchmarks not only for Ubisoft's series but for open-world gaming." Eurogamer's Tom Bramwell called the open world gameplay "a surprising breath of fresh sea air," with Gilman stating it "revitalizes the series." The large scale of the open world was praised, with Greg Tito of The Escapist saying that the game "opens up the whole Caribbean." Reviewers also praised the game's side-quests and collectibles, as it actively encouraged the player to explore the open world, with GameSpot's Shaun McInnis saying that "Black Flag presents a world full of adventure and opportunity and full of reasons to go exploring." The side-quests were generally agreed to be superior to the main missions, with IGN's Marty Sliva stating that "Black Flag is at its best [when you] set out in search of your own fun." The assassination side-missions were particularly praised. The seamless exploration between ship, land, and sea without loading was also praised.

The graphics were also widely acclaimed. The Edge staff stated that "From a graphical standpoint, Black Flag's world is built to amaze regardless of which console generation you're playing it on." Reviewers praised the game's open world as "beautiful" and "gorgeous;" Sliva called Black Flag "one of the best looking games of 2013." The game's level of detail was also acclaimed, with the open world's water, rain and sea, being cited as "amazing" to look at.

The game's naval combat system drew much praise. Reviewers noted that the naval combat was Assassin's Creed III's best feature, and consequently praised Black Flag for improving on it. Tito explained that, while Assassin's Creed III's naval missions were linear and limited, Black Flag offered the player much greater freedom by allowing them to explore, fight or sail whenever they wanted. McInnis said that the game "places a huge emphasis on naval combat," and stated that it "builds on ACIII's naval side missions to create an experience every bit as important as running around on dry land." The naval combat received praise for its additions of boarding ships and attacking forts, as well as the seamless transitions between ship and sword gameplay, with Tito calling it "a great dual system that rewards both skill in naval combat, and [in] pirate action."

The stealth in the game was praised for being more flexible than previous games by allowing the player more options to accomplish their goals. The Edge staff said that "Stealth games are only as good as the flexibility of their encounters, and in that regard Black Flag is the most generous Assassin's Creed game to date." However, some also criticized the stealth for being frustrating, due to its clunky and poorly defined controls. Reviewers noted that fighting as Edward was similar to previous games, with some criticizing it for being monotonous, too easy, and lacking nuance. However, it was also praised for being "an effective and violent power trip," and for being "fluid and lively." Some also complained about the enemy A.I. for lacking intelligence. The simplified crafting system was praised for improving over Assassin's Creed III's, with reviewers noting it took inspiration from Far Cry 3.

The story received a positive response overall. Reparaz praised it as "engrossing" and one of the Assassin's Creed series' best. Reparaz and McInnis also complimented the characters, and praised the way the story explores the human side of pirates, painting them in a sympathetic and relatable light. Bramwell felt that the story "flourishes," particularly praising the supporting characters and Edward's character arc. PlayStation Official Magazine's Joel Gregory felt that Black Flag's storyline was nothing unique for the series, though he praised the characters as "far more interesting, more likable, and more varied" than previous games. While he praised the story's first half, Gilman was more critical of the latter half, adding that its flawed pacing and structure resulted in player apathy towards the characters. Both Sliva and Juba also criticized the main story, with Juba complaining about its lack of purpose, or a compelling antagonist, and felt that most of the supporting characters were underdeveloped.

The story missions had a mixed reception. Reparaz, who gave the game high praise, felt that they were the weakest aspect of Black Flag. Juba and VideoGamer.com's Steven Burns both felt that most of the story missions were repetitive and tiring. Tito, however, felt that they were varied, and that the frustrating portions compensated by being challenging. One particular aspect that received heavy criticism from most reviewers were the eavesdropping and tailing missions, with several noting that these problems should have been fixed or removed entirely from the series. The tailing objectives were also extended to ship/sea missions, with reviewers also criticizing this form of naval stealth. The game's pacing and opening were praised, as it introduced the pirate gameplay without the need of an overly long tutorial, with Juba noting it an improvement over Assassin's Creed III.

Several reviewers labelled Black Flag a more pirate game than it is an Assassin's Creed one, due to its heavy focusing on pirating in gameplay, story, and characters. Reviewers felt that it was better for the game; they praised Black Flag's more light-hearted fare and tone compared to previous games, while also believing the game wisely avoided the usual convoluted Assassin's plot in favor of a simplistic pirate story. Gilman stated that "Black Flag is a better pirate game than it is an assassin game," with PC Gamer's Tom Senior remarking that "Black Flag doesn't really want to be an Assassin's Creed game, and [...] that is a welcome move." Reparaz called it the greatest pirate game he had ever played, while Electronic Gaming Monthly's Ray Carsillo declared Black Flag to be "probably the best pirate simulation in gaming history." Tito stated that Black Flag's gameplay reminded him more of a 3D version of Sid Meier's Pirates! than any Assassin's Creed game. Edward Kenway's character as a self-motivated pirate rather than an Assassin was also praised by most. Sliva believed that Edward's character was a "refreshing change of pace from a series that had started to take itself a bit too seriously," while he and Gilman stated that Edward was a "livelier" and more "palatable" protagonist than Assassin's Creed III's Connor.

=== Sales ===
During the first week of sales in the United Kingdom, Assassin's Creed IV: Black Flag became the best-selling game on all available formats, ahead of Battlefield 4. However, the game's opening week sales were 60% down compared to 2012's Assassin's Creed III. Ubisoft blamed the fall in demand on uncertainty caused by the upcoming transition to eighth generation consoles. According to NPD Group figures, Assassin's Creed IV: Black Flag was the third best-selling game of November 2013 in the United States, only behind Call of Duty: Ghosts and Battlefield 4. In May 2014, Ubisoft announced that the game had shipped over 11 million copies. Black Flag is the best-selling game in the Assassin's Creed franchise, with 15 million copies sold as of 2025.

=== Awards ===
Assassin's Creed IV: Black Flag has received Game of the Year nominations from media outlets GameSpot and the Inside Gaming Awards, It won the Spike VGX 2013 award for Best Action Adventure Game, and the GameSpot awards for PS4 Game of the Year and Xbox One Game of the Year.

Writers Jill Murray, Melissa MacCoubrey, Hugo Giard and Wesley Pincombe received a Writers Guild of America Awards nomination in the 67th edition for the screenplay and story of Freedom Cry.

Year	Award	Category	Result	Ref.
2013	Spike VGX 2013	Best Action Adventure Game	Won	
2014	66th Writers Guild of America Awards	Outstanding Achievement in Videogame Writing (Story by Darby McDevitt, Mustapha Mahrach, Jean Guesdon; Lead Scriptwriter Darby McDevitt; Scriptwriter Jill Murray; AI Scriptwriter Nicholas Grimwood; Scriptwriter Singapore Mark Llabres Hill)	Nominated	
2014	17th Annual D.I.C.E. Awards	Game of the Year	Nominated	
2014	17th Annual D.I.C.E. Awards	Adventure Game of the Year	Nominated	
2014	17th Annual D.I.C.E. Awards	Outstanding Achievement in Animation	Nominated	
2014	17th Annual D.I.C.E. Awards	Outstanding Achievement in Gameplay Engineering	Nominated	
2014	17th Annual D.I.C.E. Awards	Outstanding Achievement in Visual Engineering	Nominated	
2014	10th BAFTA Video Games Awards	Best Game	Nominated	
2014	10th BAFTA Video Games Awards	Action/Adventure	Nominated	
2014	10th BAFTA Video Games Awards	Game Design	Nominated	
2014	10th BAFTA Video Games Awards	Music	Nominated	
2014	14th Annual Game Developers Choice Awards	Best Technology	Nominated	
2014	32nd Golden Joystick Awards	Best Visual Design	Won	
2014	32nd Golden Joystick Awards	Studio of the Year (Ubisoft Montreal)	Won	
2014	32nd Golden Joystick Awards	Best Audio	Won	
2014	32nd Golden Joystick Awards	Best Gaming Moment (Sea shanties)	Nominated	
2014	32nd Golden Joystick Awards	Game of the Year	Nominated	
2014	Canadian Videogame Awards 2014	Game of the Year (2013)	Won	
2014	Canadian Videogame Awards 2014	Best Console Game (2013)	Won	
2014	Canadian Videogame Awards 2014	Best Audio (2013)	Nominated	
2014	Canadian Videogame Awards 2014	Best Game Design (2013)	Won	
2014	Canadian Videogame Awards 2014	Best Writing (2013)	Won	
2014	Canadian Videogame Awards 2014	Best Technology (2013)	Nominated	
2014	Canadian Videogame Awards 2014	Best Original Music (2013)	Nominated	
2014	Canadian Videogame Awards 2014	Best Game Innovation (2013)	Nominated	
2014	Canadian Videogame Awards 2014	Best Animation (2013)	Nominated	
2014	Canadian Videogame Awards 2014	Best Visual Arts (2013)	Nominated	
2014	Canadian Videogame Awards 2014	Best New Character (2013)	Won	

=== PETA criticism ===
The People for the Ethical Treatment of Animals (PETA), an animal rights organization, criticized Assassin's Creed IV: Black Flag for the usage of harpoons and the depiction of whaling. The organization said it was "disgraceful for any game to glorify [whaling]". Ubisoft responded to the claims by saying that Assassin's Creed is based on history and is a "work of fiction which depicts real events during the Golden Era of Pirates". Ubisoft stated that they do not condone whaling, nor the pirate lifestyle in general.

PETA has had a history of criticising video games, some of the notable cases being Mario and Pokémon.

== Future ==
=== Series continuation ===
The year following Black Flag's release saw two sequel titles released. Assassin's Creed Unity, set in Paris during the French Revolution and featuring a new storyline and characters, was released worldwide on PlayStation 4, Windows, and Xbox One, on November 11, 2014. Assassin's Creed Rogue, set during the French and Indian War in North America in the decade leading up to the events of Assassin's Creed III, features several returning characters from both titles, including Haytham Kenway and Adéwalé. It was released worldwide on PlayStation 3 and Xbox 360 on November 11, 2014, and on Windows on March 10, 2015.

A planned multiplayer expansion for Black Flag, designed to build upon the game's expansive naval system, entered development at Ubisoft Singapore in late 2013. As work progressed, Ubisoft decided to turn the expansion into a standalone spin-off game, initially titled Black Flag Infinite before it was renamed to Skull and Bones; this was in part due to its initial technology becoming outdated. Development of the game was troubled, with the project undergoing multiple changes in direction. This caused it to exceed its initial budget and suffer numerous delays. Skull and Bones was eventually released on February 16, 2024, for PlayStation 5, Xbox Series X/S and Windows.

=== Remake ===
In early 2025, a remake of the game was rumored to be in development. Ubisoft CEO Yves Guillemot has also confirmed that it will be remaking more older Assassin's Creed games in the future. In March 2026, Ubisoft confirmed that the remake, titled Assassin's Creed Black Flag Resynced, was in development. A showcase was held on April 23, 2026, which confirmed that the 2013 modern-day storyline, the multiplayer mode, and the Freedom Cry DLC would not be carried over to the remake. However, it would feature improved visuals, a dynamic weather system, three additional officers to recruit, and new side quests. The remake was released on July 9, 2026 for the ninth generation of consoles and PC.
