= Tales of Kenzera: Zau =

Tales of Kenzera: ZAU
- Developer: Surgent Studios
- Publisher: Electronic Arts
- Director: Abubakar Salim
- Producer: Zoe Brown
- Designer: Zi Peters
- Artists: Micaela Dawn; Ackeem Durrant
- Writer: Louisa Atto
- Composer: Nainita Desai
- Engine: Unreal Engine
- Platforms: Nintendo Switch; PlayStation 5; Windows; Xbox Series X/S
- Release: 23 April 2024
- Genre: Metroidvania
- Mode: Single-player

Tales of Kenzera: Zau is a 2024 Metroidvania video game developed by Surgent Studios and published by Electronic Arts, under its EA Originals label. The game was released for Nintendo Switch, PlayStation 5, Windows, and Xbox Series X/S on 23 April 2024. Upon release, it received generally positive reviews from critics.

== Gameplay ==
Tales of Kenzera: Zau follows the story of a young shaman named Zau, who must capture the spirits of three monsters as offerings to Kalunga, the God of Death, who promises to revive his father. Zau is very athletic, being able to double jump, wall jump and dash through air. Zau is equipped with two weapons: the sun mask and the moon mask. The sun mask allows Zau to deal melee damage up close, while the moon mask enables him to damage enemies from afar. Both masks have their own distinct upgrade paths. As players defeat enemies, they will collect "Ulogi", a form of soul energy that can be used to purchase new skills for Zau. Tales of Kenzera is a 2.5D Metroidvania game. Players will gradually gain new skills, enabling them to unlock new paths to progress.

== Development and release ==
Abubakar Salim, who is most known for being the voice actor for Bayek in Assassin's Creed Origins, is the game's creative lead. He founded Surgent Studios in 2019, and Tales of Kenzera: ZAU is the studio's debut project. Tales of Kenzera was inspired by Salim's own experience of grief over the loss of his father. The game was heavily inspired by Bantu cultures and Salim's own experience with tribal groups while filming Raised by Wolves in South Africa. The story was also inspired by tabletop role-playing games, with Critical Role Productions assisting the game's development. Nainita Desai served as the game's composer. Salim described the game's soundtracks as a mix of synth, electric sounds and African traditional music, and compared it to the music from Black Panther and Tenet.

Surgent Studios (then known as Silver Rain Games) announced that it had partnered with publisher Electronic Arts for the development of a new game in March 2021. Tales of Kenzera: ZAU was officially announced by Salim at The Game Awards 2023 in December 2023. It was released for Nintendo Switch, PlayStation 5, Windows, and Xbox Series X/S under the EA Originals publishing label on 23 April 2024.

== Reception ==
Reception

Aggregate score
Aggregator	Score
Metacritic	PC: 76/100; PS5: 76/100; XSXS: 76/100; NS: 71/100

Tales of Kenzera: ZAU received "generally favorable" reviews from critics, according to review aggregator website Metacritic.

=== Awards and accolades ===
Accolades for Tales of Kenzera: Zau
Year	Award	Category	Result	Ref.
2024	The Game Awards 2024	Games for Impact	Nominated	
2025	New York Game Awards 2024	Off Broadway Award for Best Indie Game	Nominated	
2025	New York Game Awards 2024	Statue of Liberty Award for Best World	Nominated	
2025	New York Game Awards 2024	Great White Way Award for Best Acting in a Game (Abubakar Salim)	Nominated	
2025	Game Audio Network Guild Awards	Best Audio for an Indie Game	Nominated	
2025	Game Audio Network Guild Awards	Best Dialogue for An Indie Game	Nominated	
2025	Game Audio Network Guild Awards	Best Music for an Indie Game	Nominated	
2025	Game Audio Network Guild Awards	Best Original Soundtrack Album	Nominated	
2025	Game Audio Network Guild Awards	Music of the Year	Nominated	
2025	25th Game Developers Choice Awards	Social Impact	Honorable mention	
2025	21st British Academy Games Awards	Debut Game	Nominated	
2025	21st British Academy Games Awards	Game Beyond Entertainment	Won	
