= Stéphane Boudon =

French video game developer and creative director

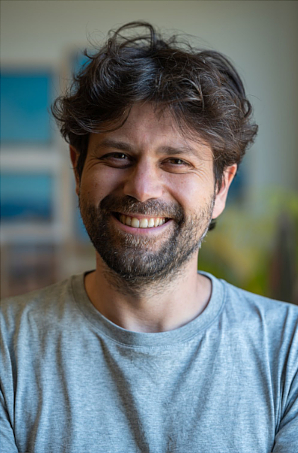
- Occupations: Level designer; Creative director
- Years active: 2005–present
- Employers: Ubisoft Paris (2005–2018); Ubisoft Bordeaux (2018–present)

Stéphane Boudon is a French video game developer and creative director working at Ubisoft Bordeaux, best known for his work on the Assassin's Creed series.

== Career ==
He began his career at Ubisoft Paris in 2005 as a level designer, contributing to titles such as Red Steel, Rayman Raving Rabbids, and Ghost Recon: Future Soldier. He later worked as senior level designer on Watch Dogs (2014), and served as lead level designer and content director on Tom Clancy's Ghost Recon Wildlands (2017).

In 2018, Boudon joined Ubisoft Bordeaux as one of its founding members. He played a pivotal role in building the studio's teams and led projects including Ghost Recon Wildlands: Year 2 and Mercenaries (2019).

=== Assassin's Creed franchise ===
Stéphane Boudon is best known for his role as creative director of Assassin's Creed Mirage (2023) a title that marked a return to the franchise's roots with a renewed focus on stealth, parkour and assassination conceived as a love letter to fans for the series’ 15th anniversary. He also directed several expansions for Assassin's Creed Valhalla, including Wrath of the Druids (2021).

=== Design philosophy ===
Boudon's design philosophy centers on player agency and environmental storytelling. Influenced by his art school background and early interest in computer graphics, he emphasizes spatial design, pacing, and immersive environments.

He aims to create focused experiences drawing from games like Hitman and Dishonored, Boudon prioritizes systemic level design and minimizes RPG elements to focus on core gameplay loops.

In his GDC presentation, co-hosted with producer Fabian Salomon, Boudon emphasized the importance of synergy between design pillars throughout development, ensuring that features supported multiple aspects of the player experience. He described this method as key to maintaining coherence and impact across the game's systems.
