= Alain Mercieca =

Canadian playwright and video game writer

- Born: Halifax, Nova Scotia, Canada
- Occupations: Playwright; Screenwriter; Video game writer
- Writing career
- Notable works: Assassin's Creed: Origins; Assassin's Creed: Valhalla

Alain Mercieca is a Canadian playwright, screenwriter, and video game writer, best known as the lead writer of Assassin's Creed: Origins (2017) and the co-lead writer of Assassin's Creed: Valhalla (2020). Mercieca's background in theatre and his edgy, punk-rock sensibility have heavily influenced his writing across different mediums, from stage to video games.

Born in Halifax, Nova Scotia, Mercieca grew up in the Hydrostone neighbourhood, known for its unique historical background following the Halifax Explosion of 1917. Mercieca co-owns Théâtre Sainte-Catherine.

Mercieca's work in theatre caught the attention of a cinematic director at Ubisoft, leading to his role as a writer for the Assassin's Creed franchise. His plays, often described as edgy and punk-influenced, have a recurring theme of spiritual quests, which Mercieca incorporated into his video game writing. Mercieca's work on Assassin's Creed: Origins was praised for bringing a sense of humility and emotional depth to the game's characters, particularly the protagonist, Bayek. His ability to blend historical accuracy with creative storytelling helped shape the narratives of both Origins and Valhalla.
