= Medjay =

Demonym for a nomadic group in Upper Nubia

G17 D36 U28 G1 M17 M17 G43 T14 A1 Z2
Medjay "mḏꜣ.j"
(throw stick det.)
in hieroglyphs

Medjay (Egyptian mḏꜣ.j, a nisba of mḏꜣ) was a demonym used in various ways throughout ancient Egyptian history to refer initially to a nomadic group from Nubia and later as a generic term for desert-ranger police. They were sometimes confused with the Pan-Grave culture.

== Origins ==
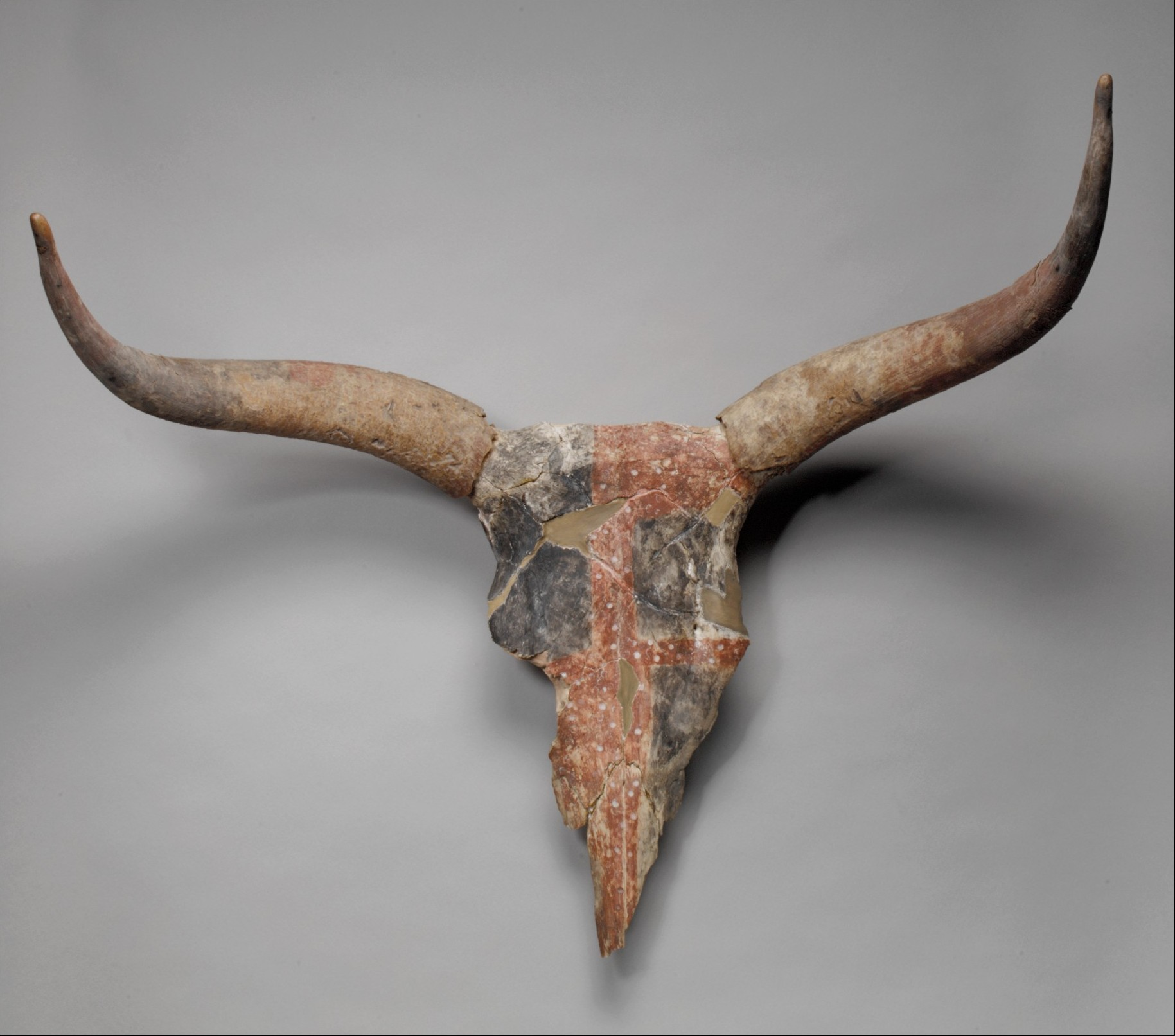
Painted bucranium from a Pan-Grave burial, dating to the Second Intermediate Period

The first mention of the Medjay in written records dates back to the Old Kingdom of Egypt, when they were listed among other Nubian peoples in the Autobiography of Weni, who was at the time a general serving under Pepi I Meryre (reigned 2332–2287 BCE). During this time the term "Medjay" referred to people from the land of Medja, a district thought to be located just east of the Second Nile Cataract in Nubia. Nubia was referred to as Ta-Seti, meaning "Land of the bow", by the Egyptians and the people there (including the Medjay) were renowned for their military skills, particularly as archers. A decree from Pepi I Meryre's reign, which lists different officials (including an Overseer of the Medja, Irtjet, and Satju, i.e. of the various Nubian groups), illustrates that Medja was at least to some extent subjugated by the Egyptian government. Since the time of Alan Gardiner, a common account has been that the Medjay constituted an ethnic group. More recent work suggests that the term was initially an Egyptian exonym. Those identified as Medjay may not have considered themselves a shared ethnicity and certainly were not a unified polity.

Gardiner suggested a diachronic model for the word “Medjay” which evolved through three meanings in the Egyptian language: First, in the Old Kingdom, the word “Medja” was a place name that seems to refer to an area north of the Second Cataract. That was the location where the Egyptians encountered groups of people associated with Medja. Second, until the end of the Second Intermediate Period, the word “Medjay” denoted an ethnic group of Nubian people who lived in the Eastern Desert around the First and Second Cataracts. They were primarily pastoral nomads. Third, in the New Kingdom, the word “Medjay” had lost its ethnic connection to Nubia and was an occupational title for policemen or desert-rangers. Additionally, the works of Säve-Söderbergh and Bietak have connected the Medjay to the Pangrave material culture of the Late Middle Kingdom and Second Intermediate Period.

Written accounts from the Middle Kingdom, such as the Semna Despatches, describe the Medjay as nomadic desert people. Egyptian sources are inconsistent in distinguishing between Nubian people generally and Medjay until the latter portion of the Middle Kingdom. Senusret III (r. 1878-1839 BCE) enacted a prohibition on Nubian movement north of Semna, which is recorded in missives from the border guard at Elephantine. At the same time, the administration began making a distinction between these two categories of people. Kate Liszka hypothesizes this may have motivated people to take on Medjay as an ethnic identity.

They also were sometimes employed as soldiers (as we know from the stele of Res and Ptahwer). During the Second Intermediate Period, they were even used during Kamose's campaign against the Hyksos and became instrumental in making the Egyptian state into a military power. The Medjay were also hired as soldiers and guards in the Kushite military as well as the Roman Egypt army.

== Pan-graves ==
In the archaeological record, a culture known as the Pan-Grave culture is generally considered by experts to represent the Medjay. This culture is named for its distinctive circular graves, found throughout Lower Nubia and Upper Egypt, which date to the late Middle Kingdom and Second Intermediate Period (1800-1550 BC). The sudden appearance of these graves in the Nile Valley suggests that they represent an immigrant population, while the presence of Nerita shells in many of them suggests their occupants came from the Eastern Desert between the Nile and the Red Sea. Other objects commonly found in these graves include the painted skulls of various horned animals, which are found either arranged in a circle around the burial pit or placed in separate offering pits.

== Police force ==
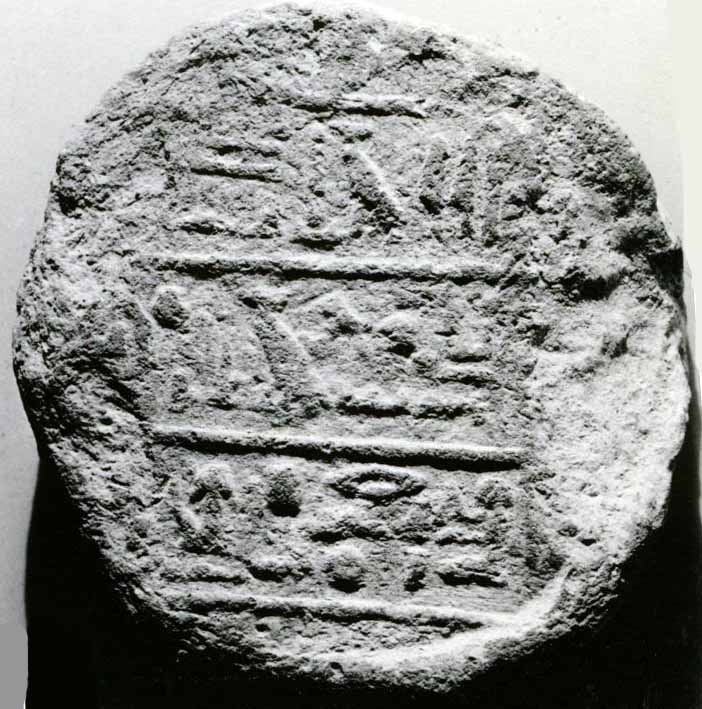
Funerary cone of Penre, an 18th Dynasty Chief of the Medjay

By the Eighteenth Dynasty during the New Kingdom, the Medjay were an elite paramilitary police force. No longer did the term refer to an ethnic group, and over time the new meaning became synonymous with policing in general. As an elite force, the Medjay were often used to protect valuable areas, especially areas of pharaonic interest like capital cities, royal cemeteries, and the borders of Egypt. Though they are best known for their protection of the royal palaces and tombs in Thebes and the surrounding areas, the Medjay were used throughout Upper and Lower Egypt. Each regional unit had its own captains. Chiefs of the Medjay are also known from the New Kingdom, but that title is more likely to refer to a person in charge of building and building material procurement.

At first, the group just consisted of ethnic Medjay and those descended from that ancient tribal group. This changed over time as more and more Egyptians took up their occupation. Records show that various Medjay chiefs and captains had Egyptian names and were depicted as such. Why this change occurred is not known, but it is assumed that, because of the Medjay's elite status, Egyptians joined them.

== Demise ==
After the 20th Dynasty, the term Medjay is no longer found in Egyptian records. It is unknown whether the Medjay as an occupation had been abolished or the name of the force had changed. However, there is speculation that a group of people called the Meded who fought against the Kush during the 5th and 4th centuries B.C. might have been related to the Medjay.

== Language ==
Linguistic evidence indicates that the Medjay spoke an ancient Cushitic language related to the Cushitic Beja language and that the Blemmyes were a subdivision of the Medjay. Rilly (2019) mentions historical records of a powerful Cushitic speaking group which controlled Lower Nubia and some cities in Upper Egypt. He claims a linguistic relationship between the modern Beja language and the ancient Cushitic Blemmyan language, which dominated Lower Nubia, and that the Blemmyes could be regarded as a particular tribe of the Medjay.

== Cultural depictions ==
In the 1999 remake The Mummy, and the sequel The Mummy Returns (2001). the Medjay are mentioned as Pharaoh Seti I's personal bodyguards in ancient Egypt.

In the 2017 video game Assassin's Creed Origins, the protagonist, Bayek of Siwa, is considered "the last Medjay". In the game, the Medjay are depicted as a police force whose job is to protect the pharaoh. However, Bayek abandons his duty when he learns that the pharaoh Ptolemy XIII is an ally to a dark and mysterious organization called "The Order of the Ancients" which is responsible for the death of his son.

In the 2020 graphic novel 20s A Difficult Age: The Blue Madjai, by Marcus Orelias, the protagonist of the series goes by the moniker "the Blue Madjai".

In the 2017 video game For Honor, in the July 2022 "Curse of the Scarab: Title Update 2" software update, a playable character named for and inspired by the Medjay was released.

In the 2021 video game Forewarned, 1-4 players explore ancient Egyptian tombs and gather evidence to identify the evil Medjai haunting the area, and can perform elaborate hidden rituals to banish them to the Egyptian afterlife. In this game, Medjay, or Medjai are depicted as malevolent undead spirits.

== See also ==
- Equites

== Bibliography ==
- Breasted, J. H. (1906). Ancient Records of Egypt, part one. Chicago.
- Gardiner, Alan H. (1947). Ancient Egyptian Onomastica. Vol. 1. Oxford University Press.
- Shaw, Ian (2000). The Oxford History of Ancient Egypt. Oxford University Press. ISBN 0-19-280293-3.
- Rilly, Claude (2019). "Languages of Ancient Nubia". Handbook of Ancient Nubia. Walter de Gruyter GmbH & Co KG. ISBN 9783110420388.
- Steindorff, George; Seele, Keith C. (1957). When Egypt Ruled the East. University of Chicago Press.
- Wilkinson, Toby (2005). Dictionary of Ancient Egypt. Thames & Hudson.
