= Abubakar Salim =

British actor and game designer

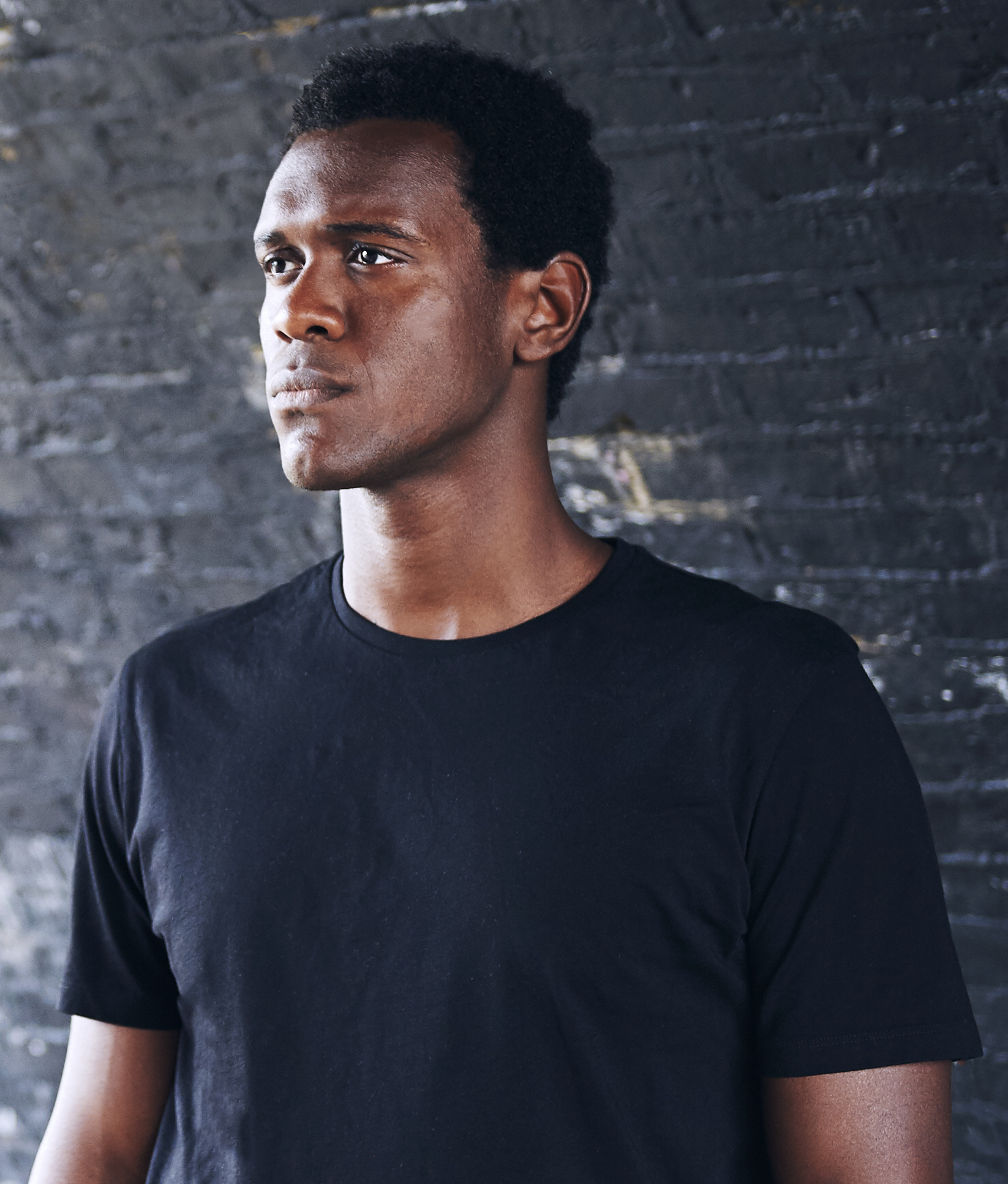
- Salim in 2017
- Born: Welwyn Garden City, England
- Education: London Academy of Music and Dramatic Art (BA)
- Years active: 2009–present

Abubakar Salim is a Kenyan-British actor and video game developer. For his work on Assassin's Creed Origins, he was nominated for a British Academy Games Award and named a BAFTA Breakthrough Brit. On television, he is known for his roles in the Sky One series Jamestown (2018–2019) and the HBO Max series Raised by Wolves (2020–2022). He is also the founder and CEO of the film and video game company Surgent Studios.

== Early life and education ==
Born in Welwyn Garden City, Hertfordshire, Salim is a first-generation Briton of Kenyan descent. His father was a software engineer for Xerox, and his mother a carer. He began his acting career at age 16 when he joined the National Youth Theatre after his first audition. He subsequently received a scholarship to study at the London Academy of Music and Dramatic Art (LAMDA), graduating in 2014 with a Bachelor of Arts in Acting.

== Career ==
Salim made his professional stage debut as Osric in Prince of Denmark at the National Theatre in 2010. This was followed in 2011 by his television debut in a series 2 episode of the ITV legal serial The Jury.

Upon graduating from LAMDA in 2014, Salim had small roles in the Fox limited series 24: Live Another Day and the Canal+ comedy-drama Spotless. He returned to the stage in 2015 with roles in Sense of an Ending at Theatre503 and Teddy Ferrara at the Donmar Warehouse. In 2016, he went on the Cheek by Jowl tour of The Winter's Tale and appeared in Labyrinth at Hampstead Theatre.

In 2017, Salim voiced Bayek in the video game Assassin's Creed Origins, for which he earned a British Academy Games Award nomination.

In 2018, Salim landed his first major television role when he joined the cast of the Sky One historical drama Jamestown for its second series as Pedro. He also appeared in the BBC One drama Informer and the third series of Fortitude on Sky Atlantic. From 2020 to 2022, Salim starred as Father in the HBO Max science fiction series Raised by Wolves.

In 2020, Salim started his own video game development studio called Silver Rain Games (later renamed to Surgent Studios), as the founder and CEO. A self-described fan of video games, Salim noted that his work for Assassin's Creed Origins gave him a better insight into the development process for video games, which eventually inspired him to pursue a career in video game development and establish his own studio. The studio's debut project, a 2D side-scrolling platform game, titled Tales of Kenzera: Zau, was released by EA Originals in April 2024. The game was nominated for both the Debut Games and Game Beyond Entertainment categories at the 2024 BAFTA Games Awards, and Salim accepted the latter in April 2025.

In 2023, it was announced that Salim had been cast as Alyn of Hull in the second season of House of the Dragon. He was confirmed to be returning in the third season of the show.

== Filmography ==
=== Television and film ===
Year	Title	Role	Notes
2011	The Jury	Sadam	1 episode
2014	24: Live Another Day	Secret Service Agent Tom	3 episodes
2015	Spotless	Charlie	2 episodes
2016	Agatha Raisin	Jonah MacGillivray	Episode: "The Potted Gardener"
2016	Black Mirror	Guard	Episode: "Nosedive"
2017	Strike	Jonah Agyeman	Episode: "The Cuckoo's Calling: Part 3"
2018	Thomas & Friends: Big World! Big Adventures!	Kwaku / Various	Voice role
2018–2019	Jamestown	Pedro	16 episodes
2018	Informer	Yousef Hassan	3 episodes
2018	Fortitude	Boyd Mulvihill	3 episodes
2020–2022	Raised by Wolves	Father	Main role; 18 episodes
2023	The Legend of Vox Machina	Zanror	Voice role; 4 episodes
2023	Napoleon	Thomas-Alexandre Dumas	Film role
2024–present	House of the Dragon	Alyn of Hull	Main role; 14 episodes

=== Video games ===
Year	Title	Role	Notes
2017	Assassin's Creed Origins	Bayek of Siwa	
2018	World of Warcraft: Battle for Azeroth	Rokhan	
2019	The Bradwell Conspiracy	Guide	
2022	Diablo Immortal		
2022	Xenoblade Chronicles 3	Other	English version
2022	The Diofield Chronicle	Chappleman	
2022	World of Warcraft: Dragonflight	Rokhan	
2023	Diablo IV	Additional Voices	
2023	Stray Gods: The Roleplaying Musical	Eros	
2024	Tales of Kenzera: Zau	Zau	also as Game Director
2025	Dead Take	–	Creative Director
2025	Dying Light: The Beast	Keller	
2025	Final Fantasy Tactics: The Ivalice Chronicles	Ultima the Arch Seraph	
2026	Highguard	Atticus	
TBA	Emberville	Unannounced role	In production
TBA	Touchstarved	Kuras	In production

=== Web series ===
Year	Title	Role	Notes
2020–2021	Vampires of Pittsburgh	Lucius Ali	Seasons: "Chronicle II: Lockdown", "Chronicle III: Reign in Blood"; Vampire: The Masquerade actual play
2022–2023	Haunted City	Valkos Sangara	45 episodes Blades in the Dark actual play
2024	Critical Role (campaign 3)	S.I.L.A.H.A (The Arch Heart)	Episodes: "Downfall: Parts 1–3", Episode: "Under the Arch Heart's Eye"; Dungeons & Dragons actual play
2025	Thresher	Daemon Adams	2 episodes Illuminated Worlds actual play
2026	Age of Umbra: Sallowlands	Mercy	Daggerheart actual play

== Stage ==
Year	Title	Role	Notes
2010	Prince of Denmark	Osric	National Theatre, London
2015	Sense of an Ending	Paul	Theatre503, London
2015	Teddy Ferrara	Police Officer	Donmar Warehouse, London
2016	The Winter's Tale	Camillo	Tour
2016	Labyrinth	Trent / Javier	Hampstead Theatre, London
