= Rufio (officer of Caesar) =

Roman military officer

- Born: Italy, Roman Republic
- Occupation: Officer
- Known for: Leading Julius Caesar's Roman legions in Egypt

Rufio was an officer of the Roman general and statesman Julius Caesar. In 47 BC he was appointed by Caesar as commander-in-chief of the three Roman legions that were stationed in Egypt.

The son of a freedman, Rufio arrived in 48 BC as a member of Caesar's army in Egypt. After Caesar intervened in the Ptolemaic struggle for the throne between the siblings Cleopatra VII and Ptolemy XIII and won the Alexandrian war against Ptolemy XIII and his allies (January 47 BC), he stationed three legions in Egypt after placing Cleopatra on the Egyptian throne. These troops belonged to the 27th, 37th, and 39th legions. These troops served to protect but also keep in check the rule of Cleopatra, who despite being Caesar's mistress was not fully trusted by the Romans.

Contrary to tradition, Caesar chose Rufio to command his forces despite Roman tradition dictating that only a man of senatorial rank should hold such a position. The main reason for this nomination was Caesar's fear that an influential senator, left behind in Egypt as commander-in-chief, could use the economically strong and strategically important land on the Nile as a base to make a bid for power. Rufio, being not of noble birth, could never amass the connections or wealth needed to threaten Caesar. Caesar also seems to have considered his officer very trustworthy; the historian Suetonius described Rufio as a lover (exoletus) of Caesar.

== Cultural references ==
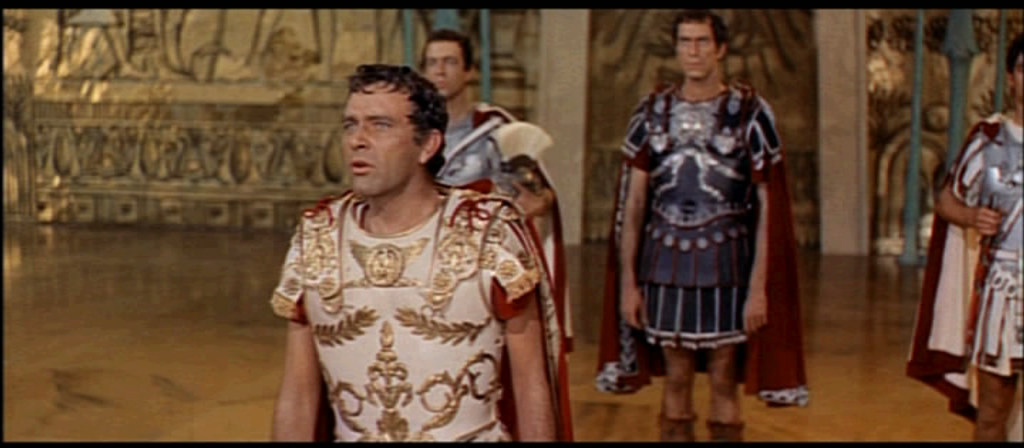
Marcus Antonius and Rufio (Richard Burton and Martin Landau) in a 1963 film Cleopatra trailer screenshot

- Rufio appears as the main antagonist of The Hidden Ones, an expansion for the 2017 video game Assassin's Creed Origins. He is referred to as Gaius Julius Rufio (possibly to highlight his close relationship to Caesar) and, like Caesar, he is depicted as a member of the fictitious Order of the Ancients, a precursor organization to the Templar Order. In an effort to reduce the Romans' control over the Sinai Peninsula, the protagonist Bayek assassinates Rufio's lieutenants to draw him out of hiding, before killing Rufio himself once he comes to Sinai in 38 BC to investigate the deaths personally.
- Rufio appears in the 1999 two-part miniseries Cleopatra, in which he was portrayed by John Bowe.
- Rufio also appears in the 1963 film Cleopatra, in which he was portrayed by Martin Landau.
- In the 1945 film Caesar and Cleopatra directed by Gabriel Pascal and based on the play by George Bernard Shaw, Rufio is played by Basil Sidney.
