= Assassin's Creed Valhalla =

2020 video game

- Cover art featuring the male version of Eivor
- Developer: Ubisoft Montreal (Note: Additional work by Ubisoft Quebec, Ubisoft Singapore, Ubisoft Sofia, Ubisoft Barcelona, Ubisoft Montpellier, Ubisoft Chengdu, Ubisoft Bordeaux, Ubisoft Kyiv, Ubisoft Philippines, Ubisoft Shanghai, Ubisoft Bucharest, Ubisoft Pune, Ubisoft Saguenay, Ubisoft Winnipeg and Sperasoft)
- Publisher: Ubisoft
- Directors: Ashraf Ismail (Note: Ismail stepped down from his role as creative director in June 2020, due to allegations of infidelity, and was later fired by Ubisoft.); Eric Baptizat
- Producer: Julien Laferrière
- Designer: Yohan Cazuax
- Programmer: Claude Langlais
- Artist: Raphael Lacoste
- Writers: Darby McDevitt; Alain Mercieca
- Composers: Jesper Kyd; Sarah Schachner; Einar Selvik
- Series: Assassin's Creed
- Engine: Ubisoft Anvil
- Platforms: PlayStation 4; PlayStation 5; Windows; Xbox One; Xbox Series X/S; Stadia
- Release: November 10, 2020: PlayStation 4, Windows, Xbox One, Xbox Series X/S, Stadia; WW: November 10, 2020; PlayStation 5; NA/AU: November 12, 2020; WW: November 19, 2020
- Genre: Action role-playing
- Mode: Single-player

Assassin's Creed Valhalla is a 2020 action role-playing game developed by Ubisoft Montreal and published by Ubisoft. It is the twelfth main installment in the Assassin's Creed series and the successor to Assassin's Creed Odyssey (2018). Principally set in the years 872–878 AD, the game recounts a Viking fantasy story during their expansions into the British Isles. Players control Eivor Varinsdottir, a Viking raider who, while attempting to establish a new Viking clan in England, becomes embroiled in the centuries-old conflict between the Assassin Brotherhood, who fight for peace and liberty, and the Templar Order, who desire peace through control. (Note: Within the series' continuity, the Assassin Brotherhood and the Templar Order adopted their modern names during the Crusades in the 11th century. Prior to this, they were referred to as the "Hidden Ones" and the "Order of the Ancients", respectively.) The game also includes a framing story, set in the 21st century, which follows Layla Hassan, an Assassin who relives Eivor's memories so as to find a way to save the Earth from destruction.

Development of the game began in 2017, around the release of Assassin's Creed Origins. Ubisoft Montreal led its three-year development with help from fourteen other Ubisoft studios worldwide, as well as Sperasoft. Numerous people involved in the development of past Assassin's Creed games returned for Valhalla, including Ashraf Ismail, who served as the creative director for Assassin's Creed IV: Black Flag (2013) and Origins; Darby McDevitt, the lead writer for Black Flag and Assassin's Creed: Revelations (2011) and co-writer of Assassin's Creed Unity (2014); and composers Jesper Kyd and Sarah Schachner, who composed the game's soundtrack alongside musician Einar Selvik. Similarly to Origins and Odyssey, the team conducted extensive research into the time period to make the game world as historically accurate as possible, and drew inspiration from Norse mythology for certain narrative elements. The team also sought to address some issues found by players with Odyssey, such as its over ambitiousness, small focus on the Assassin-Templar conflict, and the absence of traditional Assassin's Creed gameplay elements like social stealth.

Valhalla was released for PlayStation 4, Windows, Xbox One, Xbox Series X and Series S, and Stadia on November 10, 2020, with the PlayStation 5 version following on November 12. It received generally positive reviews, with praise for the narrative, characters, voice acting, visuals, soundtrack, world-design and the interconnectivity of activities, while being criticized for its length, technical issues, and repetitive structure. The game had the biggest launch in the Assassin's Creed series to date, selling the most copies within its first week and becoming the second most profitable Ubisoft title of all time.

Ubisoft supported Valhalla extensively with two years of additional content, including both free and paid story expansions, game modes, and events. The game was followed by 2023's Assassin's Creed Mirage, which features a historical setting in Baghdad during the Islamic Golden Age and follows Basim Ibn Ishaq, a major supporting character from Valhalla.

== Gameplay ==
Assassin's Creed Valhalla is an action role-playing video game structured around several main story arcs and numerous optional side-missions, called "World Events". The player takes on the role of Eivor Varinsdottir (/ˈeɪvɔːr/), a Viking raider, as they lead their fellow Vikings against the Anglo-Saxon kingdoms. The player has the choice of playing Eivor as either female or male (voiced by Cecilie Stenspil and Magnus Bruun respectively), or letting the game alternate between the two at key moments in the story (with the female avatar depicting Eivor's life (Note: Eivor is confirmed to be canonically female in-game. Quote: "He seems in rather good graces with the two chieftains of this clan, Sigurd Styrbjornsson and Eivor Varinsdottir.") and the male avatar depicting the physical appearance of the Isu Odin, due to his connection with Eivor). The player is also able to customize Eivor's hair, beard, war paint, clothing, armor, and tattoos. The variety of weapons available to the player has been expanded to include weapons such as flails and greatswords. Combat has been changed to allow dual-wielding of almost any weapon, including shields, and every piece of gear that the player collects is unique. The Eagle Vision mechanic of previous titles returns in the form of "Odin Sight". The player's companion animal is a raven named Sýnin (Old Norse for "insight") (Note: The production team defined the name as "as close a meaning to 'insight' in Old Norse", but the word itself has several meanings in Old Norse.) who can be used to scout the nearby areas, much like previous avian companions had done in Assassin's Creed Origins and Odyssey, and other parts of the game world from afar before Eivor engages in combat. There is more focus on the stealth aspects for both traversing the game world and in combat. The "social stealth" concept from earlier Assassin's Creed games returns: Eivor can hide from enemies not only in stationary environmental objects but can pull down the hood and slip into certain crowds to use them as cover. Eivor can feign death, use her raven to distract guards, and can access a hidden blade for near-instantaneous assassinations. Most of the game's enemies, through specific combinations of approaches, tactics, and weapon selection, are able to be assassinated through a single attack, with the notable exception of bosses, but still can be defeated through numerous other routes.

Valhalla has a familiar structure of main story missions and a number of optional side-missions. While the main storyline in past Assassin's Creed games typically moved linearly through the main sections of the game world, Valhalla has the player often returning to the main settlement and back to areas previously visited as information about the new areas of England is learned by the Vikings through reconnaissance or from contacts. Not all missions require violent ends, with some that can be resolved through diplomatic means. Player choices through conversation or gameplay options will affect the characters and their political alliances with other non-player characters. The game also relies less on a traditional leveling system and instead focuses more on the selection of skills through skill trees selected by the player as Eivor advances through the game. The difficulty posed by enemies is rated based on the player's collection of skills. The development team aimed to introduce a wider range of enemy archetypes to Valhalla than in previous titles as they wanted the player to be continually surprised by the game even after playing for tens of hours. Narrative director Darby McDevitt said that the game has 25 unique enemy archetypes, and each "has a unique way of challenging the player." Enemies can also use objects in the environment to their advantage. Some enemies are also capable of adapting to the player's actions and combat and finding ways to defend themselves. Enemies can also show personality during combat. While some might be intimidated by Eivor and fight more defensively, others might be more aggressive in their approach.

Conquest Battles, a feature introduced to the series in Odyssey, return in the form of "Assaults" which see the player lead armies to attack fortresses. "Raids" are smaller engagements where the player leads a raiding party to attack a target and secure resources for their settlement. The player is able to build a raiding party by recruiting non-player characters to assist with these. The player is able to create a Viking mercenary, or Jomsviking, that can be recruited by other players to act as a non-playable character within those games; the player gains additional in-game rewards for successful missions that their Jomsviking takes part in. As part of the game's first season of DLC content, an expanded "River Raids" game-mode was introduced which offers replayable raiding locations in new regions of England not reachable in the main map.

The game also sees the return of player settlements, which have been absent from the series since Assassin's Creed IV: Black Flag. However, where previous player settlements offered passive gameplay bonuses, the settlement in Valhalla takes on a renewed importance. Game director Ashraf Ismail described this as being "[because] a lot of what you're doing in the game world is, at the end of the day, going to feed into the settlement so that it can grow, it can flourish." Quests start and finish in the settlement and the player is able to direct the construction of certain types of buildings, which in turn provide benefits for gameplay. To build these structures, the player needs to lead the Vikings on raids to collect resources. As with Odyssey, the player is able to explore romance options for Eivor, including same-sex relations.

Though the use of naval transport has returned, naval combat has been dialed back. Eivor's longship acts more as a means of travel when performing raids and for escaping after land combat, rather than being used in combat with other naval vessels. In addition to these, the player can engage in a variety of activities such as; hunting, fishing, brawls with other Vikings, drinking contests, and flyting challenges, which Ubisoft described as "Viking rap battle[s]", in addition to an original dice game called "Orlog" and Cairn construction.

== Synopsis ==
=== Setting ===
The movement of the Great Heathen Army in England in 865 CE during the Viking expansion, near the time when Valhalla takes place, and showing some of the kingdoms the player explores in the game

In 873 CE, political pressures in Norway prompt Eivor Varinsdottir and her adoptive older brother, Sigurd Styrbjornsson, to lead their clan of Vikings to settle new lands in Anglo-Saxon England, as part of the Viking expansion across Europe. The clan comes into conflict with the kingdoms of Wessex, Northumbria, East Anglia, and Mercia over the next several years, as well as the warring sons of the legendary Viking warrior Ragnar Lothbrok, who made up the Great Heathen Army. Eivor's clan faces forces led by the rulers of these kingdoms, including Alfred the Great, the king of Wessex. It is during this time that Eivor meets the Hidden Ones—precursors to the Assassin Brotherhood—and aids them in their fight against the Order of the Ancients—precursors to the Templar Order. Explorable cities in the game include Winchester, London, and York. (Note: The city of York is referred to in-game by its Old Norse name Jórvík.) Parts of Norway and Vinland are also included, while dreamscapes of Asgard and Jotunheim also feature.

As with previous games in the series, Valhalla also features a narrative set in the modern day, which follows Layla Hassan, the modern-day protagonist previously featured in Origins and Odyssey. Valhalla also contains story elements related to the Isu, who, as part of the lore of the Assassin's Creed series, are an advanced civilization that pre-date humanity.

=== Plot ===
In 2020, the unexplained strengthening of Earth's magnetic field negatively affects the planet. Layla Hassan, Shaun Hastings, and Rebecca Crane receive a signal with coordinates in New England, where they exhume a Viking raider's remains. Layla, struggling with the Staff of Hermes Trismegistus' influence, enters the Animus to view the raider's memories.

In 855 AD in Norway, a young Eivor Varinsdottir witnesses warlord Kjotve the Cruel sacking her hometown and killing her parents before she is rescued by Sigurd, son of King Styrbjorn of the Raven Clan. Seventeen years later, Eivor has been adopted by Styrbjorn, and pursues vengeance against Kjotve. Her latest attempt fails, but she recovers her father's axe. Touching it, Eivor experiences a vision of Odin, leading her to consult the local seeress, Valka. Valka induces another vision of Sigurd losing an arm before being consumed by a giant wolf.

Sigurd returns from an expedition with foreigners Basim Ibn Ishaq and Hytham, members of the Hidden Ones, who came to Norway to eliminate Kjotve, a member of the opposing Order of the Ancients. Defying Styrbjorn's orders, Eivor and Sigurd enlist King Harald's help to kill Kjotve. Following their victory, Harald declares his intention to unite Norway under his rule. Styrbjorn pledges fealty to Harald, angering Sigurd, who expected to inherit the crown. He and Eivor take loyalists in the clan on an exodus to England, where they establish their own settlement named Ravensthorpe.

After setting up Ravensthorpe, Eivor focuses on securing alliances with neighboring Saxon kingdoms and Viking clans. She aids the jarlskona Soma in reclaiming the town of Grantebridge from the Order of the Ancients; befriends the Sons of Ragnar led by Ivar, Halfdan, and Ubba Ragnarsson; helps install Ceolwulf and Oswald as Kings of Mercia and East Anglia, respectively; and settles a conflict with King Rhodri of Wales, during which she is forced to kill an increasingly bloodthirsty Ivar. At Hytham's request, Eivor also tracks down and eliminates Order members operating in Lunden, Jorvik, and Wincestre, following tip-offs from a "Poor Fellow-Soldier of Christ." Eivor's hunt for one Order member takes her to Vinland, where she recovers a strange artifact and gives it to the native Kanien'kehá:ka. (Note: The artifact is a Crystal Ball, the same one which would be used by Ratonhnhaké:ton to communicate with Juno in Assassin's Creed III.)

Eivor's visions continue. Valka gives her an elixir that makes her dream of Asgard from Odin's perspective. Hoping to avert his own fated death during Ragnarök, Odin imprisons Loki's son Fenrir, who is foretold to kill him, and retrieves a magical mead from Jotunheim that will allow him and the other Aesir to be reincarnated. Layla realizes these are actually visions of the Isu shortly before the Great Catastrophe, and that Loki, who was forbidden to reincarnate himself after betraying Odin, found another way to ensure his survival.

Sigurd and Basim discover an Isu relic, and Sigurd, with Basim's encouragement, comes to believe himself a god. Fulke, an Order agent and servant of King Alfred of Wessex, captures Sigurd, believing him to be an Isu or descendant thereof, and tortures him, removing his right arm. Eivor rallies her allies to kill Fulke and rescue Sigurd, who has also begun experiencing strange visions. Eivor later accompanies Sigurd back to Norway to investigate his visions, finding an Isu temple with a tree-shaped computer system. The siblings connect themselves to it and are seemingly transported to Valhalla, where they enjoy endless battles, until Eivor realizes it is just a simulation. Having become disillusioned with the pursuit of glory, Eivor persuades Sigurd to return to the real world, and escapes the simulation after resisting Odin.

Upon awakening, Eivor is confronted by Basim, who reveals himself, Eivor, and Sigurd to be reincarnations of Loki, Odin, and Tyr, respectively. Seeking revenge on Odin for Fenrir's imprisonment, Basim attacks Eivor, but is defeated and trapped in the simulation. Sigurd then abdicates leadership of the clan to Eivor, who returns to England. Later, Eivor and her allies join Guthrum's assault on Wessex, defeating Alfred's forces at the Battle of Chippenham. Eivor tracks down Alfred, who reveals himself as both the leader of the Order and the "Poor Fellow-Soldier of Christ." Disgusted by the Order's heresy against Christianity, Alfred sought to replace it with a new God-fearing order. Eivor spares Alfred and returns to Ravensthorpe to a hero's welcome.

In the present, the Assassins deduce the strengthening magnetic field is a result of Desmond Miles' activation of the Isu towers in 2012. To stabilize the field, Layla travels to the Norway temple and enters the simulation. She meets Basim, who reveals that he led the Assassins to Eivor, and tells her how to stabilize the magnetic field. She does so, but this releases Basim and traps Layla in the simulation. Layla encounters a being called "the Reader," and decides to work with him to prevent future disasters, allowing her mortal body to die. Meanwhile, Basim escapes the temple with the Staff of Hermes—containing the consciousness of Loki's lover, Aletheia—and meets Shaun and Rebecca. After they leave to bring William Miles, Basim enters the Animus to track down Loki's children.

=== Wrath of the Druids ===
In 879 AD, Eivor receives a letter from her maternal cousin Bárid mac Ímair, now King of Dublin, requesting her assistance in Ireland. Eivor agrees to help Bárid secure an alliance with Flann Sinna, who is to be crowned High King of Ireland. After uncovering and foiling a plot to assassinate Flann ahead of his coronation, he requests Eivor's help to gather allies and strengthen his rule. Upon taking the castle of Cashelore, Eivor discovers that Flann's army has been poisoned and seeks an antidote with Flann's advisor, Ciara ingen Medba. Eivor learns that the Children of Danu, a cult of druids who seek to oust the Norse and Christian faiths from Ireland, are responsible, and begins hunting down their members. Eivor also discovers that Ciara is a former cult member, having left upon learning of their extremist ways.

In 881 AD, Eivor uncovers the identity of the cult's leader: Eogan mac Cartaigh, the Abbot of Armagh, who feigned Christian faith. While informing Flann and Bárid, Eogan has his forces besiege Clogher. Bárid is killed in the attack, prompting Eivor to exact revenge and kill Eogan. In the aftermath, the Kings of Ireland decide to eradicate the druidic faith entirely, and Flann reluctantly agrees to launch an inquisition against the druids. Enraged upon learning of this, Ciara goes to the Lia Fáil to use its power to prevent her culture from being eradicated. She tries to take control of Flann and his men, but Eivor defeats her and the Lia Fáil is destroyed. Flann reflects on his decision and promises to be a good king for all the people of Ireland, cancelling the inquisition. Meanwhile, Eivor meets with Sichfrith, Bárid's son, who succeeded him as King of Dublin. The two reflect on Bárid's dreams, and bond as family.

=== The Siege of Paris ===
In 885 AD, Eivor is recruited by Toka Sinricsdottir, a Viking raider from Francia, to partake in a planned raid on the city of Paris. In Melun, Eivor meets Sigfred, Toka's uncle and jarl, who seeks vengeance against the Franks for the death of his brother Sincric (Toka's father). After pushing back an attack by the Frankish bishop Engelwin—the man responsible for Sincric's death—Eivor and Sigfred follow him back to Paris, where the former assassinates Engelwin, discovering his affiliation with a secretive, zealous sect of the Church called the Bellatores Dei (God's Warriors). Afterwards, hoping to avert war, Eivor seeks an audience with the Frankish emperor Charles the Fat, who agrees in exchange for the return of his missing wife Richardis. Eivor finds her being held captive by another Bellatores Dei member, a nun known as "Little Mother," whom she kills before rescuing Richardis. The two then head to Lisieux, where Eivor meets Bernard, Charles' illegitimate but only male heir. Eivor realizes that Charles actually seeks Bernard, and that Richardis is protecting him, to prevent him from being corrupted by his father.

After meeting with and being betrayed by Charles, Eivor returns to Sigfred, just as the Viking army prepares for the siege of Paris. Still hoping for a peaceful resolution, Eivor seeks out Count Odo, Paris' military leader, but he rejects her offer of peace. As the Vikings raid the city, Eivor becomes dejected after witnessing Sigfred's bloodlust, and infiltrates Odo's palace to force him to surrender. Sigfred agrees to end the siege in exchange for a hefty sum of silver and is made protector of Normandy, abdicating leadership of the clan in favor of Toka. Later, Odo contacts Eivor, asking her to find Richardis and Bernard, who have gone missing. Eivor rescues Richardis from an ordeal by fire she was put through by an increasingly mad Charles, before confronting and potentially killing Charles. Regardless of the outcome, Odo steps in to fill the void left by Charles' absence, and Eivor returns to England knowing she has a new friend and ally in Toka.

=== A Fated Encounter ===
In 887 AD, Eivor travels to the Isle of Skye after being informed by Valka's seeress friend Edyt that the locals having been suffering from intense nightmares. While searching for the source of the nightmares, Eivor runs into Kassandra, who has come to retrieve an artifact that has been affecting the locals' minds, turning many of them insane and violent. Realizing they share a common goal, the two agree to work together to find the artifact, although Eivor becomes distrustful of Kassandra due to the latter's secretive nature, and eventually abandons her after it is revealed that Kassandra's presence on the island is what activated the artifact. Upon finding the artifact—an Apple of Eden—Eivor is attacked by deranged warriors, but is saved by Kassandra, who then helps her de-power the Apple, saving the island. Deciding to celebrate their victory, Eivor invites Kassandra to attend a wedding, where the latter reveals that she has been traveling alone for a long time and has trouble socializing. Nevertheless, after partying together, Kassandra learns to open up to people more and she and Eivor part on good terms, as the former resumes her journey across the globe.

=== Dawn of Ragnarök ===
After Odin and Frigg's son Baldr is kidnapped by the Muspelheim warlord Surtr, the two travel to Svartalfheim amid the Muspel's invasion to rescue him. Odin fights Surtr, but is defeated, and Frigg is killed by Surtr's wife Sinmara. Left for dead, Odin is saved by the dwarves who have taken shelter from the invasion. Seeking a way to defeat Surtr, Odin rescues the dwarf leader Ivaldi from Surtr's son Glod and kills the latter in combat. Odin later fights Surtr's daughter Eysa, hoping to use her to bargain for Baldr's life. Although she escapes, Odin learns of a powerful relic called Salakar that Surtr seeks for himself. Odin retrieves the Salakar before Surtr can and obtains Eysa's allegiance.

Sinmara agrees to trade Baldr for the Salakar. However, at the exchange, Baldr is revealed to be a jötunn in disguise. Odin pursues Sinmara and finds the real Baldr, already dead. Sinmara kills Eysa for her betrayal before being slain by a grieving Odin. Odin then goes after Surtr and manages to defeat him using the Salakar, avenging his son. He returns to Ivaldi to inform him of his victory, but is greeted by Hyrrokin, who warns him that Surtr's death has started the Ragnarök. Odin vows to survive it, even if not in his current body.

=== The Forgotten Saga ===
After Baldr's apparent death, Odin travels to Niflheim in order to demand its ruler Hel to resurrect him. Every time he is killed during his journey, he returns to the beginning. Eventually, Odin reaches Hel's fortress Helheim and defeats her in combat. Hel then transports Odin to Baldr, who reveals that he orchestrated his own death in order to survive Ragnarök. Odin is sent back to the beginning with no memory of their reunion and vows to keep trying to bring Baldr back.

=== The Last Chapter ===
After years of resisting Odin's influence, Eivor realizes she can not suppress him forever and, feeling she has done everything she could for the Raven Clan, decides to travel to far away lands to better understand her connection with Odin. She bids farewell to her friends and allies, kindly rejecting offers from Hytham and Alfred to join the Hidden Ones and the Templars, respectively, and sets off for Vinland. There, Eivor spends her final years conversing with Odin, who tells her about the Great Catastrophe that wiped out most of the Isu, and how he and his kind came to reincarnate themselves throughout the ages.

In the present, these memories are being viewed by Basim, who realizes Eivor's connection with Odin is different from his own connection with Loki. After completing Eivor's memories, Basim is met in the Animus by William Miles, who stipulates that if they are going to work together, he will first need a sample of Basim's genetic material, allowing the Assassins to access Basim's genetic memories.

== Development ==
Assassin's Creed Valhalla had been in development for more than two and a half years by its announcement in April 2020. The main development was led by the Assassin's Creed Origins team at Ubisoft Montreal and supported by fourteen other Ubisoft studios worldwide. While the tail-end of the game's development fell during the COVID-19 pandemic, the bulk of the Ubisoft staff assigned to the game were able to work from home with the support of Ubisoft's information technology departments, assuring the game was ready for release in 2020.

Ashraf Ismail served as the creative director, having previously led work on Assassin's Creed Origins and Assassin's Creed IV: Black Flag. The game's narrative director was Darby McDevitt, who was the lead writer for Assassin's Creed: Revelations and Black Flag and co-writer of Assassin's Creed Unity. USGamer's Mike Williams described the large scope and effort behind Assassin's Creed Valhalla as the equivalent of the series' "grand unifying theory" to combine all the past design and development work into a single vision without necessarily reinventing any of the previously developed concepts. McDevitt explained that Valhalla's story was written as a recap of all the prior Assassin's Creed games, connecting them in non-trivial fashions, but not intended to be the final game in the series. He also stated that his experimental structure to the narrative was "quite unique for any game" he had seen as well as for the Assassin's Creed series itself.

Ismail cited Michael Crichton's 1976 novel Eaters of the Dead—itself a retelling of the epic poem Beowulf—as playing a major role in influencing Valhalla's setting. McDevitt said that the development team recognized there would be similarities to the God of War games, but felt those games "skew very heavily towards the mythology", whereas Ubisoft wanted Valhalla to be a more "historically grounded" experience. Elements of Norse mythology appear in the story. According to Ismail, this was based on how Eivor and the Vikings may take uncommon events to be signs of their gods' involvement rather than the more overt role that mythology played in Origins and Odyssey. This was particularly in light that much of the game takes place in England where Christianity dominated, so that the narrative and gameplay shows how Eivor would incorporate such foreign elements into their belief system. On the ability to select Eivor's gender, Thierry Noël, an advisor to the game, stated that while there was still historical debate to how much degree females participated as warriors within the Vikings, Ubisoft believed that women featured prominently in both Norse mythology and society, and so sought to reflect the Viking idea that "women and men are equally formidable in battle".

In researching the time period, Ismail and McDevitt said that the development team found that most historical records of the Viking expansion into Britain were written decades, if not centuries, after the event. They were often written from the perspective of the Anglo-Saxons and so portrayed Vikings as bloodthirsty invaders. However, the development team felt that this overlooked the Vikings' success in settling in England and the contributions they made to agricultural practices and their influence on the English language. The development team thus sought to portray the Viking Age more accurately, emphasising elements such as the settlement. This was represented in the trailer and promotional materials by juxtaposing Alfred the Great's narration warning of the threat posed by the Vikings with scenes showing the Viking community. This research, in turn, led the team to make the settlement a focal point of the game and gave Valhalla more of a role-playing flavor, according to lead producer Julien Laferrière. He compared the settlement's relevance to the importance of Skyhold in Dragon Age: Inquisition or the SSV Normandy in Mass Effect. Laferrière added that the team came to use the settlement not only to show the more cultured side of the Vikings, but as a means to show the player the results of choices they made in the game, including the "harsh choices [one had] to face" from missions.

In a Tweet that was later deleted, Ubisoft's head of communications for the Middle East Malek Teffaha discussed the subject of the game world where he stated that Valhalla will not be the largest or biggest game in the series. Teffaha also stated that Valhalla would address one of the main criticisms of Odyssey, namely that the game suffered from a bloated world populated by repetitive locations; in their review of Odyssey, IGN noted that the main story campaign—not including downloadable content—lasted for roughly forty hours, but that completing every side quest and location could extend that to over one hundred hours. In a later interview with Kotaku, Ismail described that much of the game's world was "handcrafted" and that they had put effort to developing content that was worthwhile for the player to explore and find that content, keeping it about "uniqueness" and "about respecting our players' time and giving them mysteries and puzzles to sort of resolve".

Music for the game was composed by Jesper Kyd and Sarah Schachner, both of whom have worked on past Assassin's Creed games. Einar Selvik, who had written original songs for the History Channel show Vikings, worked with Kyd and Schachner on new songs for Valhalla.

In June 2020, among other issues related to sexual misconduct within Ubisoft, Polygon reported that Ismail "said he would step down from the project following accusations of multiple extramarital affairs with younger fans. [...] Ubisoft later confirmed his departure to Polygon". In the month that followed, several other high-level executives from Ubisoft were also forced to leave the company, including the company's chief creative officer Serge Hascoët. Reports from French newspaper Libération and American news agency Bloomberg News stated that besides concerns related to professional misconduct within the company, Hascoët and other members of the editorial team had also suppressed the use of female characters in several of the Assassin's Creed games. Some members of the Valhalla development team later stated that they had wanted the protagonist to be exclusively female and had selected the name "Eivor" as an exclusively female name in Nordic databases, but had been turned down by executives who believed that a female-only protagonist would be detrimental to total game sales. McDevitt said that in writing the story, Ubisoft wanted to give players the ability to select the gender of the player-character of the game, and thus had built this aspect since the start of the narrative development.

Assassin's Creed: Valhalla introduces to the series a number of features designed to make the game more accessible to physically impaired gamers. These include, among other things, audio menu narration, and audio cues for interactive objects and partial/full quest completion, adjustments for quick-time events (QTEs), and the addition of “Guaranteed Assassinate,” a feature that enables players to skip the in-game timing window to successfully dispatch a target without concern.

== Release ==
Valhalla was originally announced to release on November 17, 2020, before later confirming that the release date had been brought forward to November 10, 2020, so that the game could be released on the launch of the Xbox Series X/S. The game was released for the PlayStation 4, PlayStation 5, Stadia, Windows, Xbox One, and Xbox Series X/S. On PC, the game was an Epic Games Store-exclusive title until December 6, 2022, when it was released on Steam. It is also the first Assassin's Creed title for the next generation of consoles, the Xbox Series X/S and PlayStation 5. Ismail said that Valhalla represents Ubisoft's "flagship" game for these next-generation systems, and has been developed to take advantage of faster loading times both new consoles offer. Four editions of the game were released: a standard edition, a "Gold Edition" with a bundled season pass, a "Valhalla Edition" with that plus various in-game customizations, and a "Ragnarok Edition" with that plus a SteelBook and personal statue. Players on the Xbox One or PlayStation 4 are able to upgrade their game to the next-gen version on their respective platform at no extra cost.

Ubisoft's 2019 title Tom Clancy's The Division 2 included an Easter egg in the form of a poster that appeared to tease the next Assassin's Creed game as named Valhalla. The poster included an image of a Viking dressed in a similar fashion to an Assassin of the series' previous titles and held what appeared to be an Apple of Eden, one of the Isu artifacts featured in the series. The Easter egg led Jason Schreier of Kotaku to report that there was a new Assassin's Creed title in development, planned for release in 2020. However, on the game's official announcement in April 2020, McDevitt said that the Easter egg in The Division 2 was a coincidence as the Swedish studio behind the game, Massive Entertainment, wanted to incorporate some Swedish iconography into The Division 2 and had no intention of referencing or teasing Valhalla.

== Additional content ==
Ubisoft announced that they would release an exclusive mission titled The Legend of Beowulf for players who pre-ordered the game. Additional post-release content was made available through a season pass. This included several story expansions; the first, titled Wrath of the Druids, takes Eivor to Ireland to eliminate a cult of druids called the Children of Danu. The second, titled The Siege of Paris, sees Eivor travelling to Francia for the Siege of Paris. Similarly to what they had done for Origins and Odyssey, Ubisoft developed an additional Discovery Tour mode for Valhalla, which removes all combat from the game and allows players to roam Medieval England and Norway at their own pace and learn more about their history and culture by embarking on guided tours curated by historians. The mode, titled Discovery Tour: Viking Age, was released for free in October 2021, serving as the third installment of the Discovery Tour sub-series.

In June 2021, Ubisoft announced that Valhalla would be the first Assassin's Creed game to receive a second year of support, including new updates and expansions. In December 2021, Ubisoft released a free crossover mission with Odyssey, titled "A Fated Encounter", which sees Eivor encountering Odyssey's protagonist, Kassandra, while investigating a series of mysterious occurrences on the Isle of Skye. The third story expansion for the game, titled Dawn of Ragnarök, was released in March 2022, and focuses on Norse mythology; it introduces the dwarven realm of Svartalfheim, where Eivor must step back into the role of Odin to rescue his son Baldr from the fire jötunn Surtr. In August 2022, a free rogue-like game mode titled The Forgotten Saga was released, which again follows Odin as he travels to Niflheim to confront Hel and demand that Baldr be resurrected after his death in Dawn of Ragnarök. As Odin, players have to explore Niflheim through various individual "dungeons", and run the risk of permadeath as they face increasingly powerful enemies. In September 2022, Ubisoft announced The Last Chapter, a free expansion to serve as a conclusive epilogue to Eivor's story and her relationship with Odin. Although originally set for release on December 6, 2022, Ubisoft released it one week earlier, on November 29. In addition to the announced content, the update also included a bonus mission featuring Roshan, a character from Valhalla's successor, Assassin's Creed Mirage, as well as the ability to keep Eivor's hood on at all times (without affecting gameplay) and a final legacy outfit inspired by Ezio Auditore's appearance in Assassin's Creed II.

The game's first major expansion – Wrath of the Druids – was promoted by Tourism Ireland, the marketing body responsible for marketing the island of Ireland overseas, in order to boost tourism interest.

== Reception ==
=== Critical reception ===
Reception

Aggregate scores
Aggregator	Score
Metacritic	PC: 82/100; PS4: 80/100; PS5: 84/100; XONE: 82/100; XSX: 84/100
OpenCritic	91% recommend

Review scores
Publication	Score
Game Informer	9.25/10
GamePro	65/100
GameRevolution	2.5/4
GameSpot	8/10
GamesRadar+	4.5/5
Hardcore Gamer	4/5
IGN	8/10
PC Gamer (US)	92/100
The Guardian	4/5
The Escapist	9/10

Assassin's Creed Valhalla received "generally favorable reviews" from critics, according to the review aggregation website Metacritic. Fellow review aggregator OpenCritic assessed that the game received strong approval, being recommended by 91% of critics.

Game Informer gave a highly positive review, praising the narrative, mix of gameplay-systems and the world of Valhalla. "Each installment hits different sweet spots for different players with varying degrees of success, but for the first time in the series, the balance feels perfect in Assassin's Creed Valhalla. With its engaging combination of combat, open-world exploration, crafted story content, and settlement management, this Viking saga is an epic with a little something for everyone."

In similar fashion, GamesRadar+ praised the game for its variety in gameplay, the narrative and for incentivizing players to make their own decisions. The reviewer summarized the 4.5/5 star review by writing: "With a sprawling world to conquer and gory combat but also the chance to use that iconic hidden blade, Assassin's Creed Valhalla brings a triumphant balance to the series."

The Escapist lauded the game as a highpoint in the franchise, praising the combat, characters, narrative and the improved qualities as a role-playing video game compared to its predecessors: "Since nearly all the various trinkets and relics and map markers have meaningful purpose, Assassin's Creed Valhalla is a rare open-world game where virtually every activity feels worth doing. Like Eivor scaling the snow-covered mountains of Norway, Valhalla achieves new heights for the RPG era of Assassin's Creed, and I've never been more excited to see where the series goes next."

GameSpot gave the game 8/10, praising the story and conclusion to several plotlines from the franchise, but noted the lack of character development, ultimately saying "Valhalla is a confident Assassin's Creed title that takes a few narrative risks which, as a whole, pay off."

IGN also gave it 8/10, writing: "Assassin's Creed Valhalla is a massive, beautiful open-world fuelled by brutal living and the dirty work of conquerors. It's a lot buggier than it should be but also impressive on multiple levels."

Hardcore Gamer compared the game favorably to its predecessors Assassin's Creed Odyssey and Assassin's Creed Origins, citing the improvements in gameplay as the reason: "Assassin's Creed Valhalla brings quality of life improvements to the new Assassin's Creed model but doesn't stray too far from familiar territory. If you enjoyed the last two games and want more of that, Valhalla is exactly what the doctor ordered, but there may be some who after spending 200+ hours completing Origins and Odyssey are burnt out on the format."

GameRevolution gave the game 2.5/4 stars, writing: "Assassin's Creed Valhalla should serve as a learning experience like Assassin's Creed Unity, the last installment that forced Ubisoft to rethink its approach. Valhalla's unnecessarily inflated hour count, limited stealth mechanics, disconnected story, and overwhelming sense of familiarity all point to a series once again on the decline because of its inability to focus on its strengths."

Rock, Paper, Shotgun gave a mixed review of the game. While praising its scope, the character of Eivor and the presentation of the world, the progression-system and the lack of coherence in gameplay were criticized. "Valhalla is daunting and messy, but it's also a pick 'n' mix of all the best bits from the series". As a conclusion, the reviewer wrote that "Valhalla is so complex that it's a poor entry point if you've never played an Assassin's Creed game before".

NRK, the national broadcaster of Norway, gave the game a positive review, describing it as an "exciting, fun, rewarding, interesting and enjoyable journey back to the Viking Age", and as having "by far the most beautiful representation of Norway in any game". The Danish newspaper JydskeVestkysten likewise gave a positive review, praising the Danish voice actors, saying Eivor "appears as a raw and self-willed viking without it getting caricatured as "Danglish"".

In early February 2021, Ubisoft was criticized by fans for what they perceived as prioritizing the use of microtransactions over gameplay improvements and bug fixes. A Reddit post gained traction with the observation that Valhalla's in-game store was currently selling nine exclusive armour sets, released after launch, which was the same number of sets available in the base game.

=== Sales ===
Assassin's Creed: Valhalla sold more copies during its first week of release than any other Assassin's Creed game, and the PC version also had the most successful launch of any PC game published by Ubisoft. On November 17, 2020, Ubisoft confirmed that the game had over 1.8 million players. The PlayStation 4 version sold 45,055 physical copies within its first week on sale in Japan, making it the second bestselling retail game of the week in the country. The PlayStation 5 version was the twenty-fifth bestselling retail game in Japan throughout the same week, with 4,227 copies being sold. Overall, the game is the second most profitable title in Ubisoft history. It went on to become the fifth best-selling game of 2020 and the sixteenth best-selling game of 2021 in the US. By February 2022, the game had made over $1 billion in revenue. According to Ubisoft's fiscal report for 2024–2025, Assassin's Creed Valhalla recorded the highest Day 1 sales revenue in the history of the franchise.

=== Awards ===
Assassin's Creed: Valhalla was nominated for Innovation in Accessibility and Best Action/Adventure at The Game Awards 2020, and for Outstanding Video Game at the 2021 GLAAD Media Award. It also earned seven nominations for the NAVGTR awards, including game of the year. During the 24th Annual D.I.C.E. Awards, the Academy of Interactive Arts & Sciences nominated Assassin's Creed Valhalla for "Adventure Game of the Year" and "Outstanding Achievement in Character" for Eivor Varinsdottir.

The soundtrack album to the Dawn of Ragnarök expansion, composed by Stephanie Economou, won the first ever Grammy award given in the category of Best Score Soundtrack for Video Games and Other Interactive Media at the 65th annual ceremony.

== Series continuation ==
The next game in the series, Assassin's Creed Mirage, was released in October 2023 for PlayStation 4, PlayStation 5, Windows, Xbox One, Xbox Series X and Series S, and is a smaller title that departs from the role-playing elements of Valhalla and its predecessors, being more akin to earlier installments in the franchise. The game also serves as a prequel to Valhalla, exploring the backstory of Basim Ibn Ishaq in 9th-century Baghdad, during the Islamic Golden Age.
