= Assassin's Creed Origins =

2017 action-adventure game

- Developer: Ubisoft Montreal
- Publisher: Ubisoft
- Directors: Jean Guesdon; Ashraf Ismail
- Producer: Martin Schelling
- Designer: Eric Baptizat
- Programmer: Frédérick Champoux
- Artist: Raphael Lacoste
- Writer: Alain Mercieca
- Composer: Sarah Schachner
- Series: Assassin's Creed
- Engine: AnvilNext 2.0
- Platforms: PlayStation 4; Windows; Xbox One; Stadia
- Release: PlayStation 4, Windows, Xbox One; October 27, 2017; Stadia; December 15, 2020
- Genre: Action role-playing
- Mode: Single-player

Assassin's Creed Origins is a 2017 action role-playing game developed by Ubisoft Montreal and published by Ubisoft. It is the tenth major installment in the Assassin's Creed series and the successor to Assassin's Creed Syndicate (2015). Set in Egypt during the reign of Cleopatra, the story follows a Medjay named Bayek of Siwa and his wife Aya as they seek revenge for the murder of their son, which leads to the founding of the Assassin Brotherhood and their long-running conflict with the Templar Order. The story is followed in the modern day by Layla Hassan, an Abstergo researcher who is inducted into the Assassins through relations.

The game's development began following the release of Assassin's Creed IV: Black Flag (2013). Ubisoft Montreal led its four-year development with help from a team of nearly 700 people from other Ubisoft studios around the world. The team consulted Egyptologists and historians extensively to ensure the setting was authentically represented in the game. In response to the common criticism that the gameplay of the series was getting stale and overly familiar, Ubisoft decided to reinvent the Assassin's Creed formula with Origins. Whereas previous entries were mainly stealth-action games, Origins introduces many elements found in role-playing games and an overhauled "hitbox-based" combat system. While Assassin's Creed had been an annual franchise since Assassin's Creed II (2009), an extra year of development time allowed the team to polish the game further. This was largely a response to the tepid sales of Assassin's Creed Syndicate, and the troubled launch of Assassin's Creed Unity (2014), which was plagued with technical issues when it was released.

Announced at E3 2017, Origins was released on October 27, 2017, for PlayStation 4, Windows, and Xbox One, and for Stadia on December 15, 2020. It received positive reviews from critics, with many calling it an improvement over previous entries and praising the story, characters, voice acting, reworked gameplay systems, world design, historical accuracy, and the visuals. However, the game also drew criticism for its pacing, quest design, and technical issues. The game has sold over ten million units worldwide and was nominated for several end-of-year accolades.

Ubisoft supported Origins extensively following its launch, releasing two story expansions—The Hidden Ones and The Curse of the Pharaohs—and a free Discovery Tour mode, which removes all combat from the game and allows players to learn about the history and culture of Ptolemaic Egypt through a series of guided tours. Its successor, Assassin's Creed Odyssey, which is set in Classical Greece during the Peloponnesian War, was released in October 2018, expanding on the revamped gameplay and continuing the new framing story.

== Gameplay ==
Players may travel around the game's open world of Egypt on horses, camels and chariots.

Assassin's Creed Origins is an action role-playing video game played from a third-person perspective. Players complete quests—linear scenarios with set objectives—to progress through the story, and can freely roam the open world environment on foot, horseback, camel-back, horse-drawn vehicles or boat. The open world includes much of Ancient Egypt, featuring vast deserts, oases, lakes and ancient cities such as Alexandria and Memphis. The game's main character, Bayek, can dive underwater and explore the lakes and the rivers, the first instance of underwater exploration in the series since 2013's Black Flag. As the players explore the world, they encounter different non-playable characters who need assistance from Bayek. These side missions, which typically involve rescuing prisoners, defeating enemies, collecting items or investigating items of interest, often take Bayek to locations of interest, where the player can find treasures. Throughout the game, players can explore tombs and pyramids, raid bandit hideouts, solve riddle puzzles to find rare loot, and discover synchronization points, which then unlock additional locations of interest and serve as fast travel points. Other side activities players can undertake include competing in a gladiatorial arena where the player fights waves of increasingly difficult combinations of enemies culminating in a boss fight, participating in chariot racing, and solving stone circle puzzles.

Players earn experience points by performing acts like completing campaign missions and side missions, discovering new locations, and defeating enemies. As the players earn sufficient experience points, they can level up and earn skill points, which can unlock new abilities. The skill tree has three unique branches: Hunter, Warrior, and Seer. Hunter improves Bayek's ranged abilities; Warrior makes Bayek a more capable melee fighter; Seer turns Bayek into a more lethal and efficient assassin. Missions and areas have a level recommendation. Players need to reach a certain level before completing them, or else the game's enemies can easily overpower them . To further enhance combat efficiency, Bayek's hidden blade, quiver, stabilizer glove, bracer, breastplate and tool pouch can be crafted using the resources collected from hunting wildlife, dismantling gear, and attacking convoys carrying supplies. Bayek needs to earn coins by looting and completing locations of interest. Coins can then be spent on purchasing or upgrading weapons, outfits and mounts. Gears and crafting materials can be purchased from a special vendor through loot boxes, though these boxes can only be purchased through the in-game currency. Despite this, some cosmetic items can only be purchased via Helix coins, which must be bought with real-world currency.

=== Combat ===
Previous titles in the Assassin's Creed series used a "paired animation system" whereby the player character would engage with an enemy and combat would be dictated by a series of predetermined animations based on player inputs and scripted AI movements. Origins moved to a "hit-box system". When the player wields a weapon, they strike at whatever is in range, allowing them to hit and injure enemies directly, and creating the possibility of missing an enemy entirely. There are two modes of melee attack—light attacks are fast but weak, and heavy attacks are slow but strong. Complementing this is the way weapons fall into different categories (common, rare and legendary) and are rated on the damage dealt, speed and range. Bayek can be equipped with eight types of melee weapons and four types of bows and arrows. Legendary weapons can usually be obtained by defeating high-level enemies called the Phylakes. As enemy combat is also dictated by the hit-box system, the player is equipped with a shield and needs to balance their offensive and defensive capabilities. Players need to use different weapons when facing different enemy archetypes. They may also need to dodge or parry hostile attacks. Adrenaline slowly builds up during combat. When the player's adrenaline bar is full, they can unleash a devastating attack with their melee weapon. Bayek also has access to tools such as sleeping darts, poison darts, and firebombs, and can use the environment to his advantage. For instance, he can light enemies on fire after shooting oil canisters with fire arrows, and set traps near braziers, defeating enemies when they attempt to call for reinforcements.

Locations within the game world enable the player to choose their playing style by offering stealth and open combat as equally viable choices for completing objectives. Players can subdue enemies by sneaking up behind them using the hidden blade, though higher-level enemies are not easily defeated. The "eagle vision" mode, which was used by the franchise to give the player the ability to scout an area by highlighting enemies and objects, has been replaced by a Bonelli's eagle named Senu as a companion. The player can take control of Senu and scout an area in advance, highlighting enemies who will then be visible when they return to controlling Bayek. Players can hide in tall grass or navigate rooftops to avoid enemies' attention. Bayek can, however, whistle to draw an enemy toward him, allowing assassination when the player is still in hiding. As with other Assassin's Creed games, Bayek is an expert in free running and can climb nearly all structures. The player can also tame various predators, which will serve as a companion for the player and assist them against enemies. Naval combat returns in sections where players control Bayek's wife Aya, who can command a ship and attack hostile ship vessels.

== Synopsis ==
=== Setting ===
The player takes on the role of an Egyptian Medjay named Bayek of Siwa and his wife Aya, as they work to protect the people of Ptolemaic Egypt during a time of widespread upheaval. The Pharaoh, Ptolemy XIII, struggles to maintain his rule while harboring ambitions of expanding his kingdom. His sister, the recently deposed Cleopatra, begins marshaling loyalist forces to launch a counter-coup against Ptolemy. Additionally, incursions into the Kingdom by the Roman Republic under the command of Julius Caesar lead to fears of an imminent invasion. Bayek's role as a Medjay brings him and Aya into contact with the secretive forces manipulating these events and into forming the Hidden Ones, the precursor organization to the Assassin Brotherhood. The story is followed in the modern day by Layla Hassan, an Abstergo researcher who covertly reads Bayek and Aya's memories to uncover the origins of the Assassins and secure a senior position in Abstergo's Animus project. In experiencing Bayek's memories, Layla may encounter a series of ancient structures built by the First Civilization. Each contains a message that alludes to Layla playing a pivotal role in an upcoming apocalyptic event.

=== Plot ===
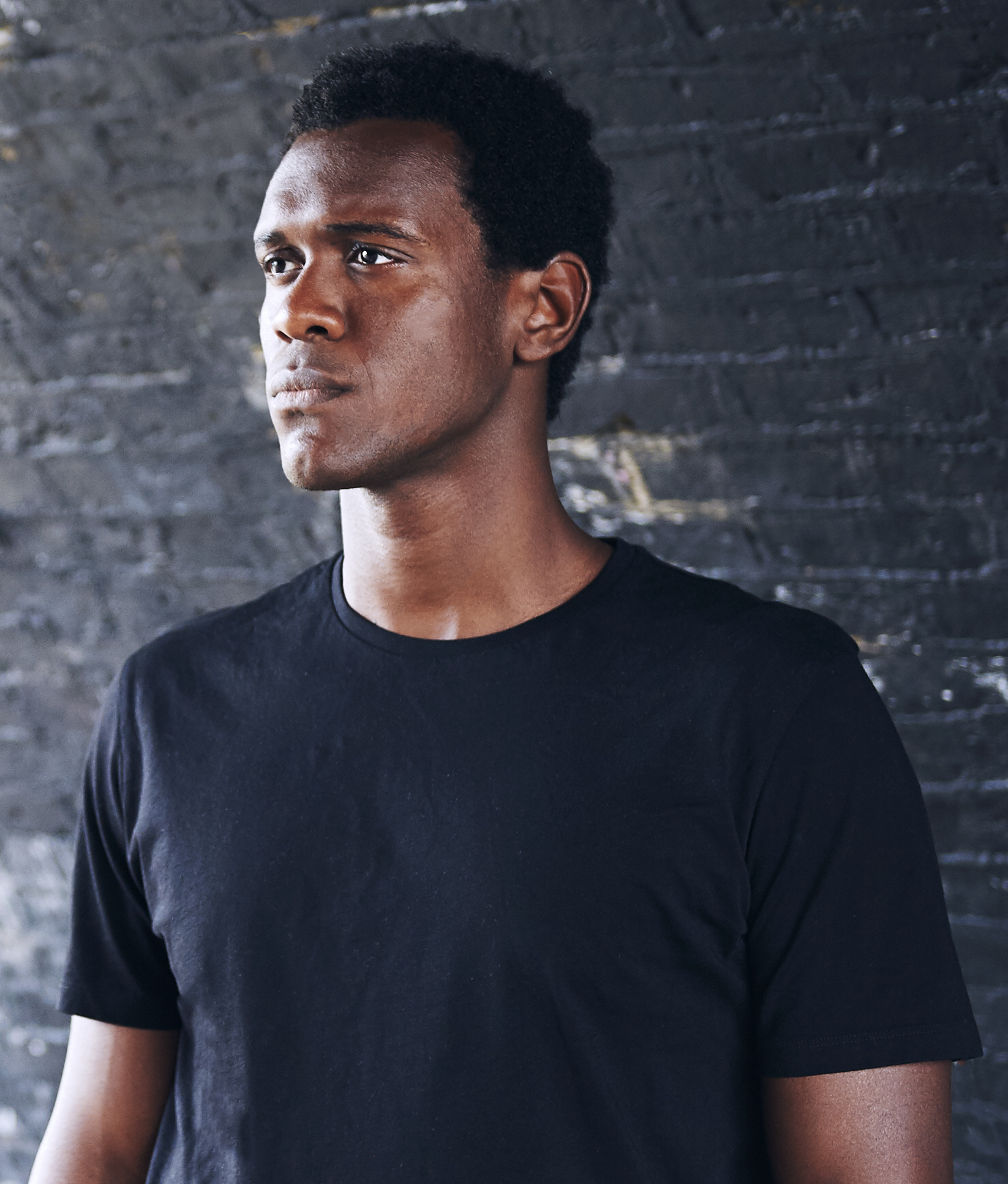
Bayek was voiced by Abubakar Salim.

In 2017, Layla Hassan, a researcher for Abstergo Industries, is tasked with retrieving an artifact in Egypt on their behalf. Instead, she finds a tomb containing the mummified body of Bayek of Siwa. Hoping to find information that would secure her a position in the company's Animus Project, Layla covertly obtains a DNA sample and reads Bayek's memories using a modified Animus device. In 49 BC, Bayek, a Medjay charged with protecting the Siwa Oasis, is abducted along with his son Khemu by a group of masked men and taken to an underground vault in the Temple of Amun. They give Bayek a dormant Apple of Eden and demand that he use it to open the vault. Khemu helps Bayek escape, but while struggling with one of the masked men, Bayek inadvertently kills Khemu.

One year later, Bayek has exiled himself to track down the five masked men and take his revenge. After eliminating two targets, Bayek heads for Alexandria to meet his wife Aya. Aya reveals that she has also killed two masked men, leaving only one target. Bayek identifies the Royal Scribe Eudoros as the last target and assassinates him, but is disturbed by Eudoros' last words, which imply there are more masked men. Realising Aya should be buried in the same tomb, Layla locates her mummy and inputs her DNA into the Animus, which synchronises her memories with Bayek's. Aya directs Bayek to her friend Apollodorus for more information. Apollodorus introduces him to Cleopatra, who confirms that the masked men are members of the Order of the Ancients, which ousted her from the throne and seeks to control Egypt using Ptolemy as their puppet.

Cleopatra gives Bayek four new targets which he tracks them down and assassinates, while Aya commands a fleet to negotiate an alliance with the Roman general Pompey. Bayek receives a letter from Aya explaining there are more Order members at large, including members of Ptolemy's royal guard, and assumes that Cleopatra is using him to eliminate her rivals. Having failed to report in, Abstergo sends a team to kill Layla, but she kills them first and returns to the Animus. Aya joins Bayek to meet Pompey, but they find him assassinated by Order member Lucius Septimius. Cleopatra decides to try with Pompey's rival Julius Caesar, who is in negotiation with Ptolemy, and sneaks into the palace rolled in a carpet to meet him.

Bayek and Aya break into the tomb of Alexander the Great so Cleopatra can show Caesar, impressing him and securing his support in the war against Ptolemy. In the midst of the fighting, Bayek kills Ptolemy's regent Pothinus, an Order member, but is restrained from killing Septimius by Caesar on the ground that he's Roman. Meanwhile, Aya draws her bow to kill Ptolemy, but holds back and watches as his boat is attacked by crocodiles, causing him to fall into the Nile and drown. Cleopatra takes the throne as Pharaoh and cuts ties with Bayek and Aya, while Septimius becomes an advisor to Caesar. Bayek realizes that Cleopatra and Caesar have now allied themselves with the Order, and gathers his allies to form a secret brotherhood to fight the Order and defend the people's free will.

Bayek and Aya return to investigate Alexander's tomb, where they find a mortally wounded Apollodorus who warns them that Caesar's lieutenant Flavius Metellus is the leader of the Order and took the Apple and Alexander's Staff of Eden. Returning to Siwa, they find that Flavius and Septimius have used the Apple and Staff to open the Vault, which contains a map with the locations of more Pieces of Eden. Bayek tracks Flavius to Cyrene, where the latter has used the Apple to enthrall the population. He kills Flavius, avenging Khemu's death, and returns to Aya. Aya reveals that she is going to Rome to fight the Order's influence there and has joined the conspiracy of Brutus and Cassius to assassinate Caesar. The pair bid farewell and form the Hidden Ones, the foundation of the Assassin Brotherhood, swearing to protect the world from the shadows.

Layla is awoken by William Miles, who invites her to join the Assassins for her own protection. Although declining to join the Assassins, Layla agrees to go to Alexandria with him. Aya sails to Rome and confronts and kills Septimius before infiltrating the Roman Senate, where she takes the first hit on Caesar before other senators follow suit. Later, she meets Cleopatra and warns her to be a fair ruler, or she will return to assassinate her. Afterward, Bayek and Aya, now calling herself Amunet, (Note: In Assassin's Creed II, Amunet is described as a legendary Assassin who killed Cleopatra in 30 BCE.) begin recruiting and training other Hidden Ones as they build the Brotherhood in Egypt and Rome, respectively.

=== The Hidden Ones ===
In 38 BC, several years after the foundation of the Hidden Ones, Bayek receives a letter from Tahira, the leader of their bureau in the Sinai, who requests his help as the region is being invaded by Rome and the local Hidden Ones are struggling to handle the situation. Upon arrival, Bayek meets rebel leader Gamilat, whom the Hidden Ones have allied with to fight the Romans. Together with Tahira, they devise a plan to lure out General Rufio, the leader of the Roman invasion and a member of the Order of the Ancients, by assassinating his three lieutenants. Bayek does so, but upon returning to the Hidden One bureau, the hideout is attacked by the Romans, who capture Bayek and Tahira. The former is rescued by Amunet, who has also come to the Sinai to investigate the situation. The two then free Tahira and another captive Hidden One, but Tahira soon dies from injuries she has received.

Once Rufio arrives with his fleet, Bayek and Amunet help Gamilat's rebels to defend a village before Bayek infiltrates Rufio's ship and assassinates him. However, he is disturbed by Rufio's final words, which imply that the Order is an ideology, not a group, and therefore immortal. As Bayek returns to Amunet, she informs of Gamilat's actions of planting his men among innocent villagers, knowing that the Romans would kill indiscriminately, thus creating martyrs to motivate more people to join the rebellion. Bayek confronts Gamilat and kills him when he defends his actions as a necessary evil. Afterwards, realizing the importance of a Creed to serve as a moral guideline for the Hidden Ones and to ensure their survival over time, Bayek and Amunet address their apprentices and create their first tenet: the prohibition of harming innocent lives. Bayek is unsure if they have done good, but Amunet re-assures him and the two share one final moment together before Amunet returns to Rome.

=== The Curse of the Pharaohs ===
In 34 BC, Bayek receives a letter from Amunet informing him of a disturbance in Thebes, which she believes is a sign of another Piece of Eden. Deciding to investigate, Bayek travels to the city and discovers the disturbance to be a "curse" which has seemingly resurrected several past pharaohs as undead spirits to haunt the region. After defeating the spirit of Nefertiti, Bayek heads to Luxor to meet Amunet's contact Merti, who informs of stolen relics being sold on the black market and directs him to the High Priestess and God's Wife of Amun Isidora for more information.

Investigating the market, Bayek meets the historian Tahemet, who gives him an invitation for an auction of an artifact stolen from Nefertiti's tomb. Bayek discovers that the artifact has already been taken by the thief Sutekh, who intends to return it to the tomb, and convinces Sutekh to let him return it instead. Inside the tomb, Bayek finds a mysterious portal that seemingly transports him to Aaru, where he again encounters and defeats Nefertiti's spirit. Meeting with Isidora, she directs Bayek to investigate a cult worshipping the heretic pharaoh Akhenaten. In the process, Bayek learns that Akhenaten once held the Piece of Eden he seeks and finds another portal taking him to Aten, where he must overcome the pharaoh's spirit.

After further investigation, Bayek learns from Tahemet of a ritual where the Piece of Eden is used and how to put Ramesses II to rest. Upon venturing into the Heb Sed and defeating Ramesses' spirit, Bayek investigates the ritual and learns that the Piece of Eden has been passed into the care of the priests of Amun, meaning it was in Isidora's possession all along. Learning that she has used the artifact to unleash the "curse" as retribution for her mother's murder by tomb robbers, Bayek travels to the tomb of Tutankhamun to confront Isidora and recover the Piece of Eden. However, Isidora refuses to stand down and uses the artifact to "transport" Bayek to the Duat, where he is confronted by Tutankhamun's spirit. After defeating it, Bayek kills Isidora and gives the Piece of Eden to Sutekh, trusting him to hide it somewhere it will never be found.

== Development ==
Ubisoft Montreal led the game's development, with assistance provided by other Ubisoft studios in different parts of the world. The team in Montreal previously worked on Assassin's Creed Revelations and Assassin's Creed IV: Black Flag. Development began after Black Flag's completion and lasted approximately four years. Ubisoft Sofia and Ubisoft Singapore played prominent roles in designing the game's map and quests. Sofia worked on the game's tomb and pyramids, while Singapore crafted the naval combat. Jean Guesdon and Ashraf Ismail, who both worked on Black Flag, returned as the game's directors. Nearly 1,000 people worked on the game; only 300 came from the Montreal studio. Ubisoft described this model of development as "co-development" where, unlike previous installments in the series, the support studios had more freedom and their work was more integral to the whole. According to Ismail, the co-development model allows each area in the game's world to be unique. Despite this, the Montreal studio set some guidelines that all studios needed to follow. For instance, the distance that a quest requires the players to travel is limited. For the quests in a hub area, there can only be one "funny" mission and one eradication mission. Ubisoft's goal was to modernize the series.

Ancient Egypt was one of the most popular choices requested by fans of the series, but Ubisoft had declined the idea. Alex Hutchinson, the creative director of Assassin's Creed III, called Ancient Egypt—along with the other two chosen settings, Feudal Japan and World War II—"the worst choices" for a setting. In a later interview, however, Ismail said Egypt was a setting the team wanted to explore and acknowledged fans' requests. He believed Ubisoft had not chosen Egypt for previous installments because of technological constraints. 49 BC was chosen as the game's setting because it reflected an "impressive clash of civilizations". Egyptian culture was thriving but nearing its decline, while the Romans and the Greeks exerted a strong influence over Egypt, culminating in its annexation by the Roman Empire following the game's events. Ismail called this setting "epic" because it showed the "death of one world, [and] the birth of a new one". Initially, the team started with the world map from Black Flag and turned all its water bodies into landmasses. With such a large map, they needed to fill it with meaningful content, so they incorporated elements from role-playing video games and quests into the game. Puzzles, hunting, and military outposts were added to facilitate the player's exploration of the game's world. The game's combat was completely overhauled, as the developer wanted to give players more freedom of choice. For the first time, difficulty settings were introduced to the series to ensure the combat would be accessible.

The studio consulted Egyptologists and historians, and secured deals with universities to ensure that experts on the subject could provide the team with information and research. In addition to recruiting in-house historians, they also consulted academics like Jean-Claude Golvin to place landmarks in the game's world and recreate ancient paintings. The historians were involved in the game's creative process. For instance, Evelyne Ferron, one of the game's consultants, convinced Ubisoft to modify a scene featuring public mummification in a temple because the scene went against the "Egyptian mentality" at that time. Alan Gardiner's Egyptian Grammar: Being an Introduction to the Study of Hieroglyphs served as the foundation for the language spoken by the NPCs, though the team also drew from the works of James Allen and Raymond Faulkner. The goal was not to create a historically accurate version of Egypt but to make Egypt an authentic setting. The team watched films and TV series to see how ancient Egypt was portrayed in pop culture, and adjusted the game when they felt the focus on history had impeded gameplay and entertainment. Some cities featured in the game were larger than they were initially as the developer "wanted to create this sense of pharaonic scale in places like Alexandria and Memphis". Ismail added that if an event is well documented, the artists followed the historian's consensus. However, for parts that were not well-researched, they would design and recreate them on their own.

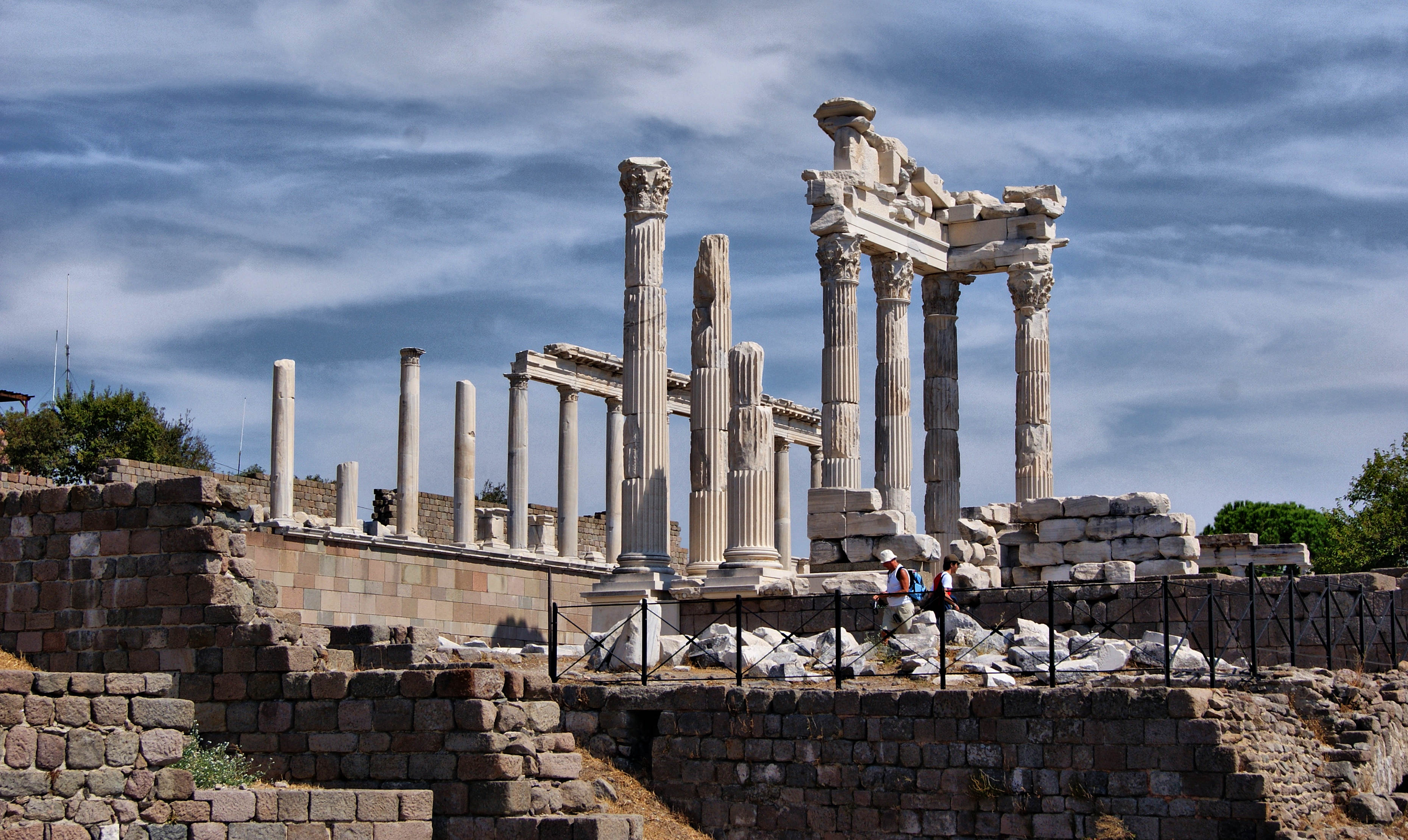
Historical consultant Evelyne Ferron visited the ruins of Pergamon in Turkey, a city inspired by ancient Alexandria, when the team was designing the Egyptian city.

The team also endeavored to make the game world more immersive. To this end, the studio added sandstorms to the game, and players would experience a mirage if they remained in the heat too long. Cities have distinct designs which reflect their origins. While designing Alexandria, inspirations were taken from Pergamon, Turkey, whose design resembled that of ancient Alexandria. While most locations were handcrafted, artists and programmers made use of procedural generation to fill vast, open areas with rocks, grass and trees. Mini-map from the head-up display (HUD) were replaced with a compass, as they believed this made the HUD less obstructive and encouraged players to explore. To make the world more dynamic, the team invested a lot of time into designing the artificial intelligence of the non-playable characters, ensuring they would have a routine every day such as working during daytime and sleeping at night. Quest givers travel and do not stay in a fixed position, and players can choose the time of day to assassinate their targets. Factions also respond differently to players.

Alain Mercieca was invited to serve as the game's narrative director after a cinematic director saw one of his "punk plays" called Squeegee Nights. The lead character, Bayek, was more experienced and mature than other protagonists in the series. Ismail described Bayek as a "reactive" protagonist, who could express various emotions. Bayek, as a Medjay from Siwa Oasis, a traditional village in Egypt, embodies an older way of life and Egyptian traditions. As Egypt is about to be annexed by the Roman Empire in the game, Bayek must find out "what he needs to do, what he needs to become". His personal quest would lead ultimately to the formation of the Assassin Brotherhood. Abubakar Salim, who was initially told that he was auditioning for an animated TV series that required motion capture, voiced Bayek. In 2020, a report from Bloomberg alleged that Ubisoft, in particular the marketing department and Chief Creative Officer Serge Hascoët, had tried to minimize the role of female assassins in a number of Assassin's Creed games. Initially, Bayek was expected to be injured or killed off early in the game, and the main playable character would become Aya. Actress Alix Wilton Regan voiced Aya.

== Release ==
Following the release of Assassin's Creed Syndicate (2015), which sold fewer copies than its predecessors, Ubisoft decided against releasing an Assassin's Creed game in 2016. Ubisoft allowed one year of additional development time so they could "evolve the game mechanics" and reposition the series as a "premier open-world franchise". Ubisoft CEO Yves Guillemot later added that this also gave the Montreal studio additional time to polish the game and learn from Assassin's Creed Unity (2014), whose troubled launch alienated the series' fans. Ubisoft had released new installments in the franchise every year since 2009's Assassin's Creed II. Assassin's Creed Origins was first leaked in January 2016, with Kotaku sources suggesting the game was codenamed Empire and set in ancient Egypt. Ubisoft announced it officially at Microsoft's press conference during E3 2017. The game was released for PlayStation 4, Windows, and Xbox One worldwide on October 27, 2017. There were five special editions of the game available when it launched. The Stadia version released on December 15, 2020.

=== Additional content ===
Ubisoft supported the game extensively following its official launch. Several gear packs were released for the game, and Ubisoft partnered with Square Enix, the developers of Final Fantasy XV, to create crossover content. All season pass holders have access to two pieces of story-driven downloadable content (DLC) packs. The first pack, The Hidden Ones, was released on January 23, 2018, and is set five years after the game's main narrative, focusing on Bayek and Amunet's efforts to expand the Hidden Ones' influence and liberate the Sinai Peninsula from Roman occupation. The second pack, The Curse of the Pharaohs, was set to be released on March 6 but was delayed to March 13. This DLC focuses on Egyptian mythology, as Bayek travels to Thebes to investigate a curse that has apparently brought several ancient pharaohs back from the dead. Both packs raise the maximum players' level and introduce new outfits, mounts and gears.

Ubisoft also released several free updates for the game. In December 2017, they added a new mission named "Here Comes a New Challenger", introducing a new gladiatorial arena in Cyrene. The update also includes a new difficulty mode named Nightmare, and enemy scaling, where low-level enemies will have their level increased to match the player's level. Ubisoft also released a series of missions named Trials of the Gods, which allows players to fight high-level bosses inspired by Egyptian deities. A New Game Plus mode was introduced in February 2018. An update in April introduced the Animus Control Panel for PC players, allowing them to adjust gameplay parameters such as increasing the movement speed, possessing infinite health, and increasing the number of tame animals.

Ubisoft released Discovery Tour in February 2018. It consists of 75 guided tours, each lasting from five to 25 minutes. They focus on the landmarks featured in the game and the social traditions and the way of life of ancient Egyptians. The tours feature "academic information curated by historians and Egyptologists" based on research from universities and institutions like the British Museum. Discovery Tour removes combat from the game entirely, allowing teachers to show this portion of the game to schoolchildren directly. The team received feedback from people in the education field and designed the tour and its control to be as accessible as possible, and allow players to explore at their own pace. In an article on history-themed video games, Damals magazine wrote the Discovery Tour mode presented a transformation from an entertainment product to an interactive learning aid. In its 2018 exhibition on the "Queens of Egypt", the Pointe-à-Callière Museum in Montreal, Canada, incorporated images and video sequences from Discovery Tour. A standalone free version of Discovery Tour was released in May 2020. A similar Discovery Tour mode would later be released for Assassin's Creed Odyssey and Assassin's Creed Valhalla. Discovery Tour: Ancient Egypt, however, was heavily criticized for intellectual dishonesty and deliberate historical revisionism and inaccuracy of Egyptian society of the time (as confirmed also by the "Behind The Scenes" narrator), showing an education system in which females in reality were typically excluded but in the game is instead gender mixed.

In June 2022, Ubisoft released a patch for Origins, which boosted the framerate to 60fps on Xbox Series X/S and PlayStation 5.

== Reception ==
=== Critical reception ===
Reception

Aggregate score
Aggregator	Score
Metacritic	(XONE) 85/100 (PC) 84/100 (PS4) 81/100

Review scores
Publication	Score
Destructoid	8/10
Eurogamer	Recommended
Game Informer	8.5/10
GameSpot	7/10
GamesRadar+	5/5
IGN	9/10
PC Gamer (US)	84/100
Polygon	8.5/10
VentureBeat	75/100

Assassin's Creed Origins received "generally favorable" reviews from critics, according to review aggregator website Metacritic.

Louise Blain of GamesRadar praised the varied map design writing that each region felt unique. IGN's Alanah Pearce agreed, adding each city had its own unique culture and architecture. She added the game offered a "delightful sense of discovery" as it allowed players to come upon locations of interest organically. Chris Carter of Destructoid wrote that "at no point did Origins feel inauthentic", and applauded Egypt as a unique setting for a video game. Like Pearce, he explored the game's world more than previous Assassin's Creed games. VentureBeat's Stephanie Chan described Egypt as "a spectacle to behold", praising its varied map design and the puzzles inside tombs and temples. Alessandro Fillari of GameSpot also liked Egypt as a setting, calling it "vibrant and lush". He believed it had a "strong sense of life", though he noted some regions are too sparse. He praised the dense towns and cities in the world, and commended Ubisoft's attention to detail. Writing for PC Gamer, Christopher Livingston noted the recommended level of an area made Origins similar to a massively multiplayer online game (MMO) and remarked it created "a feeling of artificial difficulty".

Blain praised the game's design and applauded the team for ditching the franchise's staple gameplay features such as paired animation combat, tailing missions, and an excessive amount of collectibles. Pearce liked the elimination of forced stealth missions and the implementation of a redesigned parkour system, which removed the frustration she had with earlier installments. She also applauded the new progression system, which gave players more choices than previous games, and the action-focused combat, which she described as "tense". Suriel Vasquez of Game Informer praised the game's openness, since it gave players freedom to approach objectives in their own way. He described the combat as being more active and involving. Chan described the combat as "flawed" but "generally solid", though she disliked segments featuring Aya and Layla as she felt they interrupted the gameplay. Christian Donlan, writing for Eurogamer, believed that the combat was a significant improvement over its predecessors and felt it reflected the franchise's new direction. He believed that the combat was more engaging, commenting it required players to use strategy, especially when they were facing different enemy archetypes together. However, he felt that the combat and the gameplay were unoriginal, and added that "everywhere you look in Origins you'll find things that you have done in other games". Both Pearce and Fillari complained the lock-on system did not work properly. Fillari added it turned "battles that could be tactical and fierce into disorienting and clumsy encounters". Fillari also noted that the control for stealth was less responsive than the previous games and considered it one of Origins' weakest aspects.

Blain liked the game's quests noting that starting one side quest might initiate a chain of additional narrative side missions that players can complete. Pearce called the story "delightfully mystical" and "elaborate", while Fillari applauded the narrative for successfully balancing "moments of heartbreak and earnestness". Pearce also praised the side-quests for being memorable and featuring "multi-faceted, interesting characters with believable motives". While Carter noted that the game had a rough start, the tale involving the cult and the Order of the Ancients slowly became more intriguing and interesting. Chan criticised some campaign missions, especially those involving assassinating members of the cult, for being anticlimactic. She praised the side-quests for reflecting the everyday life of Egypt, but she lamented they were repetitive. She compared completing locations of interest to running errands. Andy Kelly, also from PC Gamer, added that the game was "guilty of a particularly egregious example of padding", and wrote that during his 28 hours play time to finish Origins, at least eight hours were spent on completing side content "against [his] will". Livingston remarked the player was often forced to grind for experience points before they could complete the main campaign missions, which broke the flow of the main campaign. Bayek is generally well-liked by critics. Donlan called him "charming", while Polygon's Colin Campbell described him as "kind" and "devout".

Chris Naunton of Southampton University created Playing in the Past, a T.tv series, using Origins to teach the history of ancient Egypt. He and other Egyptologists described the game's depiction of the era as "the best visualization of Ancient Egypt ... amazing".

=== Sales ===
In November 2017, Ubisoft announced sales of Assassin's Creed Origins during its first 10 days were double those of Assassin's Creed Syndicate, while player engagement increased. 35% of the sales were digital download, compared to just 12% for Syndicate. It was the best-selling retail game in the UK in its first week of release, beating competitors including Super Mario Odyssey and Wolfenstein II: The New Colossus, which were released on the same day as Origins. It was the second best-selling retail game in the US in October 2017, behind Middle-earth: Shadow of War, and the third best-selling game in November, behind Call of Duty: WWII and Star Wars Battlefront II. The game sold more than 10 million copies during life of eighth generation of video game consoles.

=== Awards ===
Year	Award	Category	Result	Ref.
2017	E3 2017 Game Critics Awards	Best of Show	Nominated	
2017	E3 2017 Game Critics Awards	Best Console Game	Nominated	
2017	E3 2017 Game Critics Awards	Best Action/Adventure Game	Nominated	
2017	35th Annual Golden Joystick Awards	Ultimate Game of the Year	Nominated	
2017	The Game Awards 2017	Best Action/Adventure Game	Nominated	
2017	Titanium Awards	Game of the Year	Nominated	
2017	Titanium Awards	Best Artistic Design	Nominated	
2017	Titanium Awards	Best Narrative Design	Nominated	
2017	Titanium Awards	Best Adventure/Role-Playing Game	Nominated	
2017	Titanium Awards	Best Interpretation	Nominated	
2018	New York Game Awards 2018	Statue of Liberty Award for Best World	Nominated	
2018	16th Visual Effects Society Awards	Outstanding Visual Effects in a Real-Time Project	Won	
2018	16th Visual Effects Society Awards	Outstanding Created Environment in an Episode, Commercial, or Real-Time Project	Nominated	
2018	21st Annual D.I.C.E. Awards	Adventure Game of the Year	Nominated	
2018	21st Annual D.I.C.E. Awards	Outstanding Achievement in Character (Bayek)	Nominated	
2018	21st Annual D.I.C.E. Awards	Outstanding Technical Achievement	Nominated	
2018	National Academy of Video Game Trade Reviewers Awards	Art Direction, Period Influence	Nominated	
2018	National Academy of Video Game Trade Reviewers Awards	Control Design, 3D	Nominated	
2018	National Academy of Video Game Trade Reviewers Awards	Costume Design	Nominated	
2018	National Academy of Video Game Trade Reviewers Awards	Game, Franchise Adventure	Nominated	
2018	National Academy of Video Game Trade Reviewers Awards	Graphics, Technical	Nominated	
2018	National Academy of Video Game Trade Reviewers Awards	Lighting/Texturing	Nominated	
2018	National Academy of Video Game Trade Reviewers Awards	Original Dramatic Score, Franchise	Nominated	
2018	National Academy of Video Game Trade Reviewers Awards	Use of Sound, Franchise	Nominated	
2018	Italian Video Game Awards	People's Choice	Nominated	
2018	Italian Video Game Awards	Game of the Year	Nominated	
2018	SXSW Gaming Awards	Excellence in Visual Achievement	Nominated	
2018	SXSW Gaming Awards	Excellence in Animation	Nominated	
2018	Game Developers Choice Awards	Best Technology	Nominated	
2018	14th British Academy Games Awards	Best Game	Nominated	
2018	14th British Academy Games Awards	Game Design	Nominated	
2018	14th British Academy Games Awards	Performer (Abubakar Salim)	Nominated	
2018	ASCAP Composers' Choice Awards	2017 ASCAP Video Game Score of the Year	Nominated	

== Sequel ==
The game was followed by Assassin's Creed Odyssey, which takes place in Ancient Greece during the Peloponnesian War. Developed by Ubisoft Quebec, the game was released on October 5, 2018 for PlayStation 4, Windows, and Xbox One.
