= Bayek of Siwa =

Assassin's Creed character

Bayek
- Assassin's Creed character
- First appearance: Assassin's Creed: Origins – Desert Oath (2017)
- First game: Assassin's Creed Origins (2017)
- Created by: Ubisoft Montreal
- Portrayed by: Abubakar Salim

In-universe information
- Family: Sabu (father); Ahmose (mother)
- Spouse: Aya (wife)
- Children: Khemu (son)
- Origin: Siwa Oasis, Ptolemaic Kingdom, Egypt
- Nationality: Egyptian

Bayek is a fictional character in Ubisoft's Assassin's Creed video game franchise. He serves as the protagonist of the 2017 title Assassin's Creed Origins, in which he is portrayed by British actor Abubakar Salim through performance capture, though his first appearance was in the tie-in novel Assassin's Creed: Origins – Desert Oath, which further explores his backstory. The character has made minor appearances or been referenced in subsequent games and spin-off media of the franchise.

Within the series' alternate historical setting, Bayek lived during the final years of the Ptolemaic Kingdom, shortly before it was annexed by the Roman Empire as the Province of Egypt. Born and raised in the remote settlement of the Siwa Oasis (hence his epithet Bayek of Siwa), he dedicates his life to ensuring the security and welfare of the Egyptian people as the last of the Medjay, a title he inherited from his father. In Origins, Bayek fights against the imperialist incursion of Roman troops into Egypt as his tragic past of conspiracy, loss, and death is gradually revealed. Alongside his wife Aya, he is the co-founder of the Hidden Ones, the precursor organization to the series' fictional Assassin Brotherhood, which is inspired by the real-life Order of Assassins. As leader of the Hidden Ones, he sometimes used the alias "Amun" when signing off on letters of correspondence.

Bayek's character has been received positively by critics and fans of the Assassin's Creed series, and he is regarded as one of the franchise's best and most popular protagonists. As with the series' other protagonists, Ubisoft has released various merchandise promoting the character.

== Creation and development ==
Bayek's name, written in Egyptian hieroglyphs, has been featured as in-game and promotional art.

The character's name Bayek is a play on the Egyptian hieroglyphic word for falcon or vulture, in line with a longstanding tradition of naming protagonist characters in the series after birds of prey. Bayek shares a symbiotic relationship with his eagle, Senu, who aids him in reconnaissance. Senu is considered to be the living precursor to the series’ Eagle Vision, and can be upgraded to distract and attack enemies. For the majority of the game, Bayek is not an Assassin but a Medjay, a well-known and respected man in ancient Egyptian society, and as such there is less emphasis on him to lurk in the shadows or blend in with crowds compared to previous Assassin's Creed protagonists. As the player character, Bayek also serves as a lens through which players could understand the importance of religion and ritual daily life in ancient Egypt, and the larger societal issues at play in Ptolemaic Egypt such as class conflict between ethnic Greeks and native Egyptians. Bayek's narrative journey also reveals the origins of staple traditions in the series, like the feather ritual, the cut finger, and the leap of faith.

Jean Guesdon, the Creative Director for Origins, noted that a holistic approach is essential in order to create an authentic in-game world, and remarked that "small details help make it feel real". This meant that every team involved in the development of Origins, including but not limited to audio, animation, narrative, level design teams, had to learn as much as possible about the history of ancient Egypt, which informs their approach in integrating the culture into more than just the environment. One of the ways this is accomplished is through the quest system for Origins, which allows players to learn more about ancient Egyptian civilization through intimate moments with other characters. For example, the "Bayek's Promise" quest involving finding twelve different stone circles throughout the in-game world. Locating each circle triggers a flashback conversation between Bayek and his son Khemu while the two stargaze. These conversations approach topics like love, family, and loss, with each tying to a specific Egyptian deity represented in a constellation and provides insight into the family's culture and religious beliefs. According to Guesdon, the purpose of presenting these side quests and complex non-player characters with their own personal stories is about reinforcing the connection between the player and ancient Egypt, and that by emphasizing on personal storytelling, the writing team built their interpretation of ancient Egyptian culture into the foundation of nearly every quest in Origins.

While Bayek's story arc is filled with themes of revenge, political turmoil, and civil war, the developers made it a point to ensure that players do not lose sight of his core personality. Bayek is described as more mature and stoic in nature compared to previous protagonists, but is also characterized as an intense individual. He is also depicted as playful and possesses a loving nature, with a particular fondness for children and cats and readily shows his tender side during these interactions, even as he carries his grief of losing his son with him.

In July 2020, a report by Jason Schreier from Bloomberg claimed that Bayek was originally meant to be incapacitated or killed off early in the story, and the game's narrative would continue with Aya as the player character. Senior game writer Jana Sloan van Geest responded to fan comments about the report and explained that while she loved Bayek as a character, she admitted that Aya's personality is "underdeveloped", and confirmed Bloomberg's story about the character's role being reduced over the course of development.

=== Portrayal ===
Bayek was British actor Abubakar Salim's first major acting role. The role of Bayek was originally advertised as an animated TV series that involved motion capture. Salim recalled that when he reached the audition room, he was asked to read a completely different character, which lasted two rounds, before being informed that the role he auditioned for was in fact the protagonist of the next Assassin's Creed video game. A self-confessed fan of the video game series, Salim initially reacted with shock, as well as elation at the realization that he would follow iconic series characters Altaïr Ibn-LaʼAhad and Ezio Auditore da Firenze. On developing a voice for Bayek, Salim said that it was a collaborative creative process with the developers, and they worked a lot on building the in-universe world and defined the rules as they went along. He noted that while there are no recordings which show how an ancient Egyptian accent would really sound like, it was important that they could develop, with assistance from multiple experts on ancient Egyptian culture, an accent that was recognizable but not too similar to the modern Egyptian accent. Salim recalled that the script for Origins contained many phrases and slang from the developer's idea of the historic Egyptian language to make dialogue a little more colourful, and that he was particularly fond of the Egyptian swear words.

To perform his role, Salim wears a lycra suit and a large helmet, with an attached camera directed towards his face. He noted that the motion capture process would take place in one space without transitioning to another physical set or any interference from lighting issues, and that the camera's precise position is not important as it would be taken care of by staff in the editing room; the focus is on his interactions with the other actor. For performance capture of combat situations, he is given a stick with a ball attached and a dustbin lid to simulate a sword and shield respectively. For Salim, a motion capture performance felt liberating compared to theatre performance in front of a live audience or for film performance where camera positioning is very important. In a later interview, Salim reflected that his work for Origins gave him a better insight into the development process for video games, which eventually inspired him to pursue a career in video game development and establish his own studio, Silver Rain Games.

== Appearances ==
=== Assassin's Creed: Origins ===
In Assassin's Creed: Origins, the player experiences Bayek's life as part of a simulation played by another in-game protagonist, Layla Hassan, through her Animus device. The game's backstory establishes that Bayek served as the last Medjay of Siwa, acting as a protector for his people, until 49 BCE, when his son Khemu was killed during an altercation with five masked men who sought to open an underground vault in the Temple of Amun. Seeking to avenge his son, Bayek abandoned his Medjay duties and went into a self-imposed exile for a year while hunting down the masked men responsible for Khemu's death. After killing his first two targets in the Bent Pyramid and Siwa, respectively, and acquiring an Apple of Eden from one of them, Bayek travels to Alexandria to reunite with his wife Aya, who reveals that she has also killed two masked men, leaving only one target. Bayek identifies and assassinates him, but is not convinced that all of the masked men are dead.

Later, Bayek meets the deposed Egyptian Queen Cleopatra, who confirms that the masked men are members of the Order of Ancients, the same organization that removed her from the throne and seeks to control all of Egypt by using her brother Ptolemy XIII as their puppet. After Cleopatra confirms there are more Order members at large, Bayek tracks them down and eliminates them while Aya convinces Pompey the Great to ally with Cleopatra. However, Pompey is later assassinated by Lucius Septimius, a member of the Order, forcing Bayek and Aya to sneak Cleopatra into the palace to meet Julius Caesar, where she impresses Caesar and secures his support in her civil war against Ptolemy.

During a battle between the two rival pharaohs and their forces, Bayek kills Pothinus, Ptolemy's regent and an Order member, but is stopped from killing Septimius by Caesar. Following Ptolemy's death during the battle, Cleopatra secures the throne as undisputed ruler of Egypt and cuts ties Bayek and Aya, which leads them to realize that Cleopatra and Caesar are now allied with the Order. In response, Bayek gathers his allies to form a secret brotherhood to counter the Order and protect the people of Egypt from the shadows, vowing to fight for justice and freedom instead of revenge.

Bayek and Aya later discover that the Order have stolen both the Apple of Eden and Alexander the Great's Staff of Eden, using them to open the vault in the Temple of Amun and access a map with the locations of more artifacts. Bayek subsequently tracks down Flavius Metellus, the leader of the Order and the man responsible for Khemu's death, to Cyrene, where he kills him and recovers the Apple. Afterwards, he ends his spousal relationship with Aya on amicable terms once they both come to the conclusion that they can never return to their old lives. Instead, they both choose to fully dedicate themselves to their brotherhood, naming it the Hidden Ones, and part ways, with Bayek remaining in Egypt while Aya, now calling herself Amunet, travels to Rome.

==== The Hidden Ones ====
In the first story expansion for the game, The Hidden Ones, set five years after the main story, Bayek is called to the Sinai Peninsula by his friend Tahira who oversees the local Hidden Ones bureau. Sinai is occupied by the Roman Empire, whose men are forcing the local population to mine turquoise. Tahira is concerned that the Hidden Ones' support for a rebel faction from Nabatea has led to their exposure and asks for Bayek's aid. Bayek agrees that the Hidden Ones are vulnerable and decides to kill the three lieutenants of General Rufio, the consul of Sinai, hoping to draw him out. However, the Hidden Ones' bureau is fire-bombed, and Tahira is killed. Bayek is captured and crucified, but is saved by Amunet, who warns him that his actions in Sinai risk exposing the entire Brotherhood. Rufio arrives and begins slaughtering the villagers to subjugate the population. Bayek and Amunet stop the massacre, and the former kills Rufio, who reveals that Caesar had rebuilt the Order of Ancients before his death and that their influence extends to the breadth of the Empire, worrying Bayek.

Amunet later asks Bayek to look into Gamilat, the rebel leader who has provoked fights with the Romans and then hidden his men among civilians, knowing that the Romans would kill indiscriminately, thus creating martyrs to motivate more people to join the rebellion. Bayek confronts Gamilat and kills him when he defends his actions as a necessary evil. With the people believing the Hidden Ones destroyed, Bayek decides to rebuild the Brotherhood discreetly and expand to Judea, the Levant and beyond. Due to the actions of Gamilat, he also decides to create a code of conduct with strict tenets that every Hidden One must follow, beginning with the prohibition of harming innocent lives.

==== The Curse of the Pharaohs ====
In the second expansion, The Curse of the Pharaohs, Amunet asks Bayek to investigate a disturbance in Thebes which she believes is a sign of another Piece of Eden. Bayek arrives to find the city in the grip of fear as apparitions of the undead plague the region. He learns that two relics have been stolen from nearby tombs: the first, belonging to Nefertiti, was taken by black-market antiquities dealers who intend to sell it; the other, belonging to Akhenaten, was stolen in retaliation for a cult worshiping him being established in Thebes, where the veneration of Akhenaten is heresy. Believing the relics will grant the user the same power as the Apple that Flavius used to subjugate Cyrene, Bayek resolves to return the relics to their proper places. He tracks both relics to a Greek official named Tychon who is based in the Temple of Hatshepsut.

After recovering the relics, Bayek visits the tombs of Nefertiti and Akhenaten in the Valley of the Kings and finds them desecrated. The only way to restore balance is to cross over into the afterlife. Bayek discovers these are reflections of the mortal world and that the corruption that had taken hold in Thebes has spread to the afterlife. He realizes that Aten is actually the Piece of Eden he is looking for and that Akhenaten was not buried with it; instead, it was passed on to his descendants and is held by the cult of Amun. The curse plaguing Thebes was unleashed by Isidora, a priestess of Amun, as revenge for the death of her mother. Bayek follows her to the tomb of Tutankhamun, where she tries to justify her actions. When she refuses to stand down, Bayek kills her and takes possession of the Aten. He then gives it to Sutekh, a thief who aided his quest, and entrusts him with hiding it in a place where it will never be found.

=== Other appearances ===
A teenaged Bayek is the protagonist of the 2017 novel Assassin's Creed: Desert Oath, which serves as a prequel story to Origins and was published prior to the release of the video game. The novel explores Bayek's backstory and his relationships with Aya and his parents, Sabu and Ahmose. In Assassin's Creed: Odyssey (2018), Bayek makes a non-canonical appearance as a simulated lieutenant on the player's ship, the Adrestia; he can be unlocked via the Ubisoft Club. Bayek is available as an unlockable character for Assassin's Creed: Rebellion (2018), a mobile free-to-play strategy RPG action game. As part of an event crossover with Capcom's Monster Hunter franchise, Bayek's layered armor was available for a limited time and unlockable by players who completed seasonal challenge rewards for Monster Hunter: World. In Assassin's Creed Valhalla (2020), Bayek has a brief voiceover cameo when the protagonist Eivor finds the Magas Codex in the side mission "A Brief History of the Hidden Ones".

Like other series protagonists, Bayek's default outfit is an unlockable cosmetic option in most subsequent releases, including the remastered versions of Assassin's Creed III and Assassin's Creed Rogue. The outfit he wears in The Hidden Ones expansion for Origins is also available to wear in Assassin's Creed Valhalla. In January 2026, Bayek was added as a playable Legendary Champion in RAID: Shadow Legends as part of a limited-time collaboration between the game and Assassin's Creed. In August 2026, Bayek appeared in the mobile game Watcher of Realms as one of the unlockable characters introduced during its collaboration event with the Assassin’s Creed franchise.

== Promotion and merchandise ==
Like other protagonists in the series, Bayek has been subject to various merchandise. These include t-shirts, key rings, caps, mugs, artwork, a rolltop bag, and a 32 cm high PVC model of Bayek. Franchise owner Ubisoft have released numerous items of merchandise for the character, which is available for purchase on the official Ubisoft Store website. A player-assembled figurine of Bayek and Senu is included in the Dawn of the Creed Legendary Edition for Assassin's Creed: Origins. Bayek's likeness, along with five other series protagonists, was used for a line of character-themed wine labels as part of a joint collaboration between Ubisoft and winemaker Lot18; the full name of his label is "2015 Bayek of Siwa Spanish Tempranillo".

In April 2018, Ubisoft published an opinion piece by Youssef Maguid, an employee who was born in Egypt and raised in the United States, about Bayek's importance as a figure of representation and inclusivity for him as an Egyptian American and a member of an ethnic minority.

== Reception ==
Bayek has been positively received by critics and series fans, with high placements on "top character" lists. Bayek was named "Best New Character" by Giant Bomb for its 2017 Game of the Year Awards, and received a nomination for Outstanding Achievement in Character at the 21st Annual D.I.C.E. Awards. For his role as Bayek, Abubakar Salim was nominated for Best Performer at the 14th British Academy Games Awards. Salim was also selected as one of 20 newcomer actors across film, games and television by a BAFTA jury for 2019's Breakthrough Brits; his casting and performance as Bayek was recognized by BAFTA as a career highlight.

The complexity and contradictions of his identity and personality - a friendly character with empathetic traits as well as a seasoned and ruthless killer who ends up murdering thousands during his lifetime as part of his vendetta - has invited commentary from various sources. Xalavier Nelson Jr. from Rock, Paper, Shotgun considered him to be one of the best fatherly archetypes in video games. Alice Bell from Videogamer.com considered Bayek to be an even better Assassin's Creed protagonist compared to Ezio, whom Bell considers to be another favorite. In an article published in February 2019, Jason Guisao from Game Informer praised Bayek's characterization as one of the most respectful representations of blackness in video games.

Bayek's relationship with Aya has been praised by various sources. Kotaku staff considers the story of their marriage to be one of the narrative highlights of Origins. Patrick Klepek from Vice found the depiction of their relationship and their shared grief over the loss of their son to be powerful and believable, and that it does as much to make Origins memorable as the changes the game introduced to the franchise's combat system.

In response to Bayek's positive reception, then-chief creative officer of Ubisoft Serge Hascoët indicated that the character may appear in a future television or film adaptation alongside Aya. Matt Kim from US Gamer suggested that Hascoët played down the possibility of Ubisoft developing a direct sequel to Origins starring Bayek and/or Aya due to his company prioritizing the exploration of new time periods and historical settings over pre-established characters.
