= Mochizuki Chiyome =

16th-century Japanese poet and noblewoman

Mochizuki Chiyome 望月 千代女
- Born: 16th century
- Died: Unknown date
- Allegiance: Takeda clan
- Commands: Allegedly the leader of female ninjas (Kunoichi) of the Takeda clan
- Spouse: Mochizuki Moritoki

Mochizuki Chiyome (望月 千代女), also known as Mochizuki Chiyojo (望月 千代女) or Mochizuki Chiyo (望月 千代), is said to have been a 16th-century Japanese poet and noblewoman.

Fictional accounts presented her as creating a group of kunoichi in service of the Takeda clan. Her existence has been questioned by modern historians.

== Historicity ==
It has been alleged that Mochizuki's name first appeared in the 1971 book Investigation of Japanese History (考証日本史) by non-academic Shisei Inagaki (稲垣史生). Inagaki:

1. Describes the details of the Fourth Battle of Kawanakajima.
2. Claims that Moritoki Mochizuki was a husband of Chiyome and that he died at this battle.
3. Presents a historical written permission to Chiyome issued by Shingen and claims that, due to this permission, the "miko village" emerged.
4. Claims that the miko of the village became spies.
5. Claims that Chiyome then became a ninja.

However, Katsuya Yoshimaru (吉丸雄哉), an associate professor of Mie University who studies Japanese Edo period literature and the ninja, claims that Chiyome did not actually exist and lists the allegedly erroneous points of Inagaki's book:

1. There is no historical document describing the details of this battle.
2. Moritoki did not die in this battle. (that is, there is no mention of a Mochizuki Moritoki anywhere, let alone among the slain at that battle)
3. This written permission is not extant. Generally speaking, most of such kind of written permissions are forged ones.
4. The claim of spy activities of the miko is groundless; it is based only on guess of Inagaki. (note, such a claim is believable, if impossible to prove, as travelling miko would indeed have made splendid informants)
5. This is groundless as well. Although Inagaki refers History of Japanese Miko (日本巫女史), 1930, written by Taro Nakayama (中山太郎), this book says nothing about ninja and all mentions first appear in Inagaki's book.

Mochizuki's name became popular after a two-page article about her was published in a 1991 special issue of the magazine History Reader (歴史読本) titled Extraordinary Special Issue: All the Definitive Types of Ninja (臨時増刊号『決定版「忍者」の全て』). This article said that she was an upper ninja (上忍); according to Yoshimaru, historically there was no such rank in a ninja hierarchy.

== In popular culture ==
Mochizuki is featured in many video games, some of which include Nobunaga's Ambition: Souzou (DLC), Puzzle & Dragons, and Toukiden: The Age of Demons.

She is mentioned as a trainer of the playable character Kunoichi in Samurai Warriors, and appears in person in Samurai Warriors 2 as Shingen's mistress and the master and surrogate mother of Kurenai, the protagonist of Red Ninja: End of Honor. Mochizuki appears in Assassin's Creed: Memories, where she is recruited by the Templars after Shingen's death and becomes an enemy of Hattori Hanzō, and in Onimusha Soul, in which she works with the evil Genma and appears in several different forms, ages, and art styles. She is a non-playable character using Ground and Dark type Pokémon in Pokémon Conquest, and elite versions of generic "Kunoichi" enemies in Marvel: Avengers Alliance are named "Chiyome". Innocent World (Japanese version of Aura Kingdom) offered a catgirl version of Chiyome as a player character, and another game has her in a full cat form. In Sangoku Taisen, she is voiced by Miyuki Sawashiro. She also appears as an Assassin-class Servant in Fate/Grand Order. In the videogame series Shadow Tactics: Blades of the Shogun, the character Aiko comes from a kunoichi clan run by a "Lady Chiyo".

Yatsuko Tanami played her in the film Sanada Yukimura no Bōryaku. She appears as a major character in David Kudler's young-adult historical novel Risuko.
