= Assassin's Creed: Altaïr's Chronicles =

2008 video game

- North American Nintendo DS cover art
- Developer: Gameloft Bucharest
- Publisher: Ubisoft
- Producer: Antony Faby
- Designers: Bogdan Lucaci; Cristian Soare
- Artist: Arthur Hugot
- Composer: Mathieu Vachon
- Series: Assassin's Creed
- Platforms: Nintendo DS; Android iOS webOS; Symbian; Java 2 ME; Windows Phone 7
- Release: Nintendo DS: NA: February 5, 2008; AU: April 3, 2008; EU: April 11, 2008; iOS: April 23, 2009; WebOS: January 25, 2010; Windows Phone 7: November 11, 2010
- Genres: Action-adventure, stealth
- Mode: Single-player

Assassin's Creed: Altaïr's Chronicles is a 2008 action-adventure game developed by Gameloft Bucharest and published by Ubisoft. It is the first spin-off installment in the Assassin's Creed franchise, and a prequel to 2007's Assassin's Creed. Taking place in the year 1190, one year prior to the events of Assassin's Creed, the game revolves around Altaïr Ibn-LaʼAhad's search for an artifact called the Chalice, which brings him into conflict with the Templar Order. Altaïr travels to several cities in the Middle East during the game, including Jerusalem, Acre, and Damascus (also featured in Assassin's Creed), as well as Tyre and Aleppo, which are new to the series.

The game was originally released for the Nintendo DS in February 2008, and was later ported to the Windows Phone and the Android, iOS, webOS, Symbian, and Java ME operating systems. It received mixed to positive reviews from critics, and was followed by Assassin's Creed: Bloodlines (another spin-off following Altaïr) and Assassin's Creed II: Discovery (a spin-off to Assassin's Creed II), both of which were released in November 2009. The iOS and Android versions of the game were removed from the App Store and Play Store in 2013.

== Gameplay ==
Assassin's Creed: Altaïr's Chronicles is an action-adventure game in which players assume the role of Altaïr Ibn-LaʼAhad. The game is rendered in 3D from a third-person perspective and takes advantage of the Nintendo DS' features, but unlike Assassin's Creed, it is not open world. The gameplay combines hack-and-slash combat with stealth assassinations and parkour, which can be used to explore the environment. In combat, players can make use of weak and strong attacks, blocks, and various combos to defeat enemies. Later in the game, bombs, throwing knives, and a crossbow are also made available to the player. The game features three levels of difficulty: Easy, Medium, and Hard.

== Plot ==
The game is set during the Third Crusade in 1190, a year before the events of Assassin's Creed. After an unknown mission, the Assassin Altaïr Ibn-LaʼAhad arrives in Aleppo, which is under siege by the Templars, who are searching the city for someone on the orders of their Grand Master, Lord Basilisk. After learning about this from a dying Assassin, Altaïr is given a sword which he uses to fight off the attackers. Afterwards, Altaïr is tasked by Al Mualim, the Mentor of the Assassin Brotherhood, with finding the "Chalice", an artifact which is said to have the power to unite all factions and end the Crusade in victory for the side that possesses it. However, the Chalice is too powerful and must be destroyed before it falls into the wrong hands.

Altaïr begins his journey in Damascus, where he learns from a Rafik that the Chalice is kept in the Temple of the Sand and that he needs three keys to get inside. Altaïr obtains the first key in Damascus from a circus dancer/mystic named Fajera, before heading to Tyre. There, he learns that the second key has been found by Roland Napule, the head of the local hospital who is said to be twisted. Altaïr assassinates Napule and obtains the key. He then travels to Jerusalem and discovers that Lord Basilisk has the third key. Learning that Basilisk will be attending a party hosted by the king at his villa, Altaïr infiltrates it and confronts Basilisk. He defeats him and retrieves his key, but Basilisk manages to escape. Later, the Templars attack an Assassin agent, Hazad, and steal his map leading to the Temple of the Sand. Altaïr follows them to their tower, where he kills their leader, known only as "the Master", and takes the map.

Altaïr proceeds to the Temple, only to find an empty chest in the Chalice's place. He is then confronted by Lord Basilisk, who reveals that the Chalice is a woman before running away. Altaïr follows him to Tyre and, after gaining access to the Templars' hold, defeats him again. In exchange for sparing his life, Basilisk tells Altaïr that the Chalice has been taken to Jerusalem, and that the Templars are besieging Acre and plan to poison the water supply. After foiling the Templar plot in Acre, Altaïr heads to Jerusalem and rescues the Chalice, whom he identifies as Adha, a girl he met and had feelings for in the past. Adha reveals that the Templars have paid off Harash, the second-in-command of the Assassins, to help them attack the Assassin fortress in Aleppo. Altaïr thwarts the attack and assassinates Harash, but while he is away, the Templars re-capture Adha. In Tyre, Altaïr battles Basilisk one final time and kills him aboard his ship, but the Templars escape with Adha on a separate ship. Altaïr looks into the horizon and vows to find Adha. (Note: This plotline was concluded in Altaïr's Codex entries from Assassin's Creed II, where it is revealed that the Templars ultimately killed Adha, and Altaïr avenged her.)

== Reception ==
The game received mixed reviews. IGN rated it 7/10, GameSpot 6/10, Nintendo Power 7.5/10, X-Play 2/5, and Game Informer 6.5/10. Official Nintendo Magazine gave it 69%. In Slide to Play's review of the iOS version, they gave it a 2/4. On Metacritic, the Nintendo DS version of the game has an aggregate score of 58, indicating "mixed or average" reviews.
