= Assassin's Creed Identity =

2016 video game

- Developer: Ubisoft Blue Byte
- Publisher: Ubisoft
- Composer: Jeff Broadbent
- Series: Assassin's Creed
- Engine: Unity
- Platforms: iOS; Android
- Release: iOS; 25 February 2016; Android; 18 May 2016
- Genre: Action role-playing
- Mode: Single-player

Assassin's Creed Identity was an action-adventure video game developed by Ubisoft Blue Byte and published by Ubisoft. It is a spin-off installment of the Assassin's Creed series, and takes place alongside the events of Assassin's Creed: Brotherhood. In the game, players assume the role of a customisable Assassin known as Lo Sparviero (Italian for "The Sparrowhawk") and carry out various missions in Italy to weaken the control of the Templar Order, led by the villainous Borgia family. The main storyline revolves around the Assassins' conflict with a mysterious organization known as "the Crows", who can perfectly mimic their skills and techniques.

The game was initially soft-launched in 2014 as a free-to-play game for New Zealand and Australian App Stores. It was released worldwide on iOS on 25 February 2016, followed by an Android version on 18 May 2016. Identity was the first mobile game in the series to incorporate a full 3D environment and third-person traversal-style gameplay as seen in the main console titles. In October 2021, the game's online services were shut down, and it was removed from all digital storefronts two months later.

== Gameplay ==
The game takes place during the Italian Renaissance at the beginning of the 16th century, and features locations from both Assassin's Creed II and Brotherhood, such as Rome, Florence, and Monteriggioni. Forlì was added in a chapter released separately as DLC on 18 May 2016.

Gameplay is similar to the that of the mainline console releases. Players control an Assassin from a third-person perspective and can perform parkour by running towards climbable walls, hills, or other objects, whereupon the Assassin will automatically do the movement. The Assassin can also blend into various people/structures by either pressing the Action button or running into blendable structures/objects, although the Assassin must be in Alerted status or below to blend. Assassinations are performed by tapping the Action button when a nearby guard has the Hidden Blade icon over his head. During combat, players can attack, block attacks, use skills, or exit the fight. However, some skills cannot be used in combat, and exiting fights has a cooldown.

The Assassin starts off at the Anonymous status, in which normal guards ignore him. If the Assassin manages to break hostile guards' lines of sight or is doing suspicious acts, the Assassin enters Alerted status, in which normal guards watch the Assassin closely, but do not do anything. During fights or when running from hostile guards, the Assassin is in Wanted status, in which all guards attack the Assassin on sight. Assassins can lower statuses by either breaking hostile guards' lines of sight for an extended period of time or by blending. However, the Assassin will always be attacked on sight in Restricted Areas, and by some Templar enemies. During combat, the player can also summon hirelings, which depending on class, have a skill and passive upgrade. However, if the player uses the hireling's skill, the hireling can no longer be used for the mission, and passive upgrade is nullified. Players can also use the series' trademark Eagle Vision and Leap of Faith during missions.

=== Character ===
The game allows players to choose from four character classes: the combat-orientated Berserker, the stealthy Shadow Blade, the jack-of-all-trades Trickster and the agile Thief. Each class has its own set of skills and perks, like Splinter Bomb and attack upgrades for Berserker and Smoke Bomb and notoriety upgrades for Shadowblade, which can be unlocked through currency and skill points at the skill tab. Skill points are earned by leveling up, and using enough skill points unlocks a new Tier of skills for each class, with four Tiers total. Each Assassin can have both a primary and secondary class, with the secondary class unlocked through currency. The player can also unlock multiple Assassins through currency, although the Inventory is shared among Assassins. In the inventory tab, the player can equip Swords, Chest Armor, Pauldrons, Hidden Blades, Leggings, Insignias, Boosts, and Outfits. Boosts are bought in the shop, and provide temporary buffs. Items can either be bought in the shop, earned in-game, or crafted using Blueprints at the Forge tab, and provide stat increases to the player. Outfits can be unlocked through Achievements or bought in the shop, and gives buffs and a different visual appearance for the Assassin equipped.

In the shop, players can use the Heroic Shop, Items, Forge, Boosts, and more tabs, including IAP tabs. In the Heroic shop, player can spend Tokens to buy better Ranks. Each rank unlocks more difficult Contract missions, as well as three items, such as Outfits, new maps, new Contract modes, and the Thief class. Certain items and outfits can be bought in the shop, Boosts can be bought in the Boosts tab, and the player can make new items in the Forge tab.

=== Missions ===
There are two main types of missions in the game. Campaign missions advance the storyline, and often have multiple parts (or multiple objectives), as well as side objectives. Campaign missions have objectives like Tail, Escort, Assassinate, and Courier, while side objectives usually consist of assassinating special units and completing the mission within a certain time limit. Contract missions are side missions with a single objective, such as Tail, Escort, Assassinate, Courier, Pursuit, Pillage and Recovery. Both Campaign and Contract missions reward the player with items, XP, and coins. Initiate and higher level Contract missions also give Tokens.

== Plot ==
=== Italy — A Murder of Crows ===
In 1501, the Assassins are embroiled in conflict with the House of Borgia, led by Cesare Borgia, a Templar. Lo Sparviero discovers that a hidden chest from the Villa Auditore in Monteriggioni was stolen by Pietro de Galencia. His investigation leads him to Pietro's house to recover the chest, only to find letters from Cesare confirming that Pietro was a Templar spy. 5 years later, Lo Sparviero saves Leonardo da Vinci from a man wearing black-feathered armor amidst rumors of similarly dressed men replicating Assassin techniques. The chest from Villa Auditore is located in a catacomb, but a group of Assassins sent to recover it are killed. Niccolò Machiavelli sends Lo Sparviero to avenge the Assassins' deaths and finish their mission. He succeeds and brings the chest back to Machiavelli, who discovers that it contains a copy of the original Hidden Blade's blueprints, with a crow's head carved in the blade.

Later, Machiavelli receives a letter from a man named Demetrio, who was caught plotting against Cesare Borgia and asks for the Assassins' help. After Lo Sparviero saves Demetrio from being executed, the latter reveals that he was hired by Cesare to build replicas of the Hidden Blade called "Corvix Blades", using the blueprints stolen from the Villa Auditore; when Demetrio refused to create any more weapons, Cesare had him tortured, leading Demetrio to seek revenge. Demetrio also reveals that the Corvix Blades were intended for a secret organization called "The Crows", which was founded by Cesare with the goal of eliminating the Assassins through their own tactics. To train the Crows, Cesare used his contacts to trick a Spanish Assassin named Raphael Sánchez into thinking he was helping the Brotherhood, when in reality he taught Cesare's recruits how to replicate the Assassins' techniques.

One day, Machiavelli sends Lo Sparviero to investigate a Borgia camp near the Rome Colosseum. He finds a large shipment of weapons, including several Corvix Blades, and spots a Borgia captain conversing with a bald man. Lo Sparviero tails and kills the captain before confronting the bald man, who identifies himself as Sirus Favero and claims to be a weapons merchant working for Cesare Borgia. Sirus swears he had no knowledge of the Corvix Blades, and offers to help the Assassins against the Borgias. The Assassins welcome Sirus after he proves to be a viable ally. Later, Machiavelli asks Lo Sparviero to retrieve a ledger from a Templar bookkeeper. Lo Sparviero succeeds and discovers that the ledger contains information about Il Corvo ("The Crow"), the leader of the Crows.

Some time later, Sirus claims that he has located Il Corvo in Rome, but that he needs a letter from a Crow messenger to be certain. Lo Sparviero intercepts the messenger and steals the letter before delivering it to Sirus. However, he then becomes suspicious of Sirus and decides to follow him, only to be led into an ambush. Sirus reveals that he is Il Corvo, and claims that he will have revenge for the death of his son—the Borgia captain killed by Lo Sparviero—before fleeing. Lo Sparviero escapes the ambush and reports back to Machiavelli.

Later, Machiavelli is informed by his friend, Father Pio, that Borgia soldiers have locked down the Santa Croce Cathedral. Lo Sparviero goes to investigate and kills a Templar agent in the cathedral courtyard, causing chaos. He then confronts a terrified Crow messenger, and persuades him to give him his letter, which details Sirus' plan to assemble all remaining Crows in Rome to kill the Assassins. Lo Sparviero helps Machiavelli find and kill Sirus and his followers, before investigating the Crows' hideout. They find a piece of paper with the painting of a cube on it, and a chest containing a small shard. They also find several letters, one of which reveals that Sirus and Cesare hated each other, while another talks about an object called the Crystal Cube that is of high importance to the Templars.

=== Forlì — A Crimson Sunset ===
Several months after the events of the main campaign, one of Machiavelli's spies reports that several surviving Crows are behind a recent string of murders in Forlí. Machiavelli is then visited by his friend Ezio Auditore, who has retrieved an artifact with supposedly magical powers. The Assassins decide to give it to their ally, Caterina Sforza, Countess of Forlí, for safekeeping. Machiavelli then sends a message to his spy, asking him to meet in Forlí. Lo Sparviero escorts Machiavelli to the meeting, which is ambushed by the Crows, but the Assassins are able to fend them off. Machiavelli then decides to eliminate the Crows once and for all, and asks Lo Sparviero to help him. Lo Sparviero identifies an undercover Crow and follows him to a Crow meeting, where he kills all the participants.

Later, the Borgias attack Forlí and capture several of Machiavelli's spies. Lo Sparviero manages to rescue most of them before they are executed, but while the former is away, Machiavelli himself is captured and taken to a small church outside the city. One of the spies who witnessed the incident promptly informs Ezio, who in turn tells Lo Sparviero. The two then work together to rescue Machiavelli and kill his captors. Later, Machiavelli expresses his belief that all the remaining Crows were killed or scattered during the attack on Forlí, meaning the Assassins have one less threat to worry about.

== Development ==
Assassin's Creed Identity was developed by Blue Byte, using the Unity game engine. It was initially soft-launched for iOS in Australia and New Zealand in September 2014, with a general worldwide release for iOS on 25 February 2016. The game was released for Android on 18 May 2016.

== Reception ==
Assassin's Creed Identity received "mixed or average" reviews according to review aggregator Metacritic.

Reception

Aggregate score
Aggregator	Score
Metacritic	69/100

Review scores
Publication	Score
Destructoid	6/10
Pocket Gamer	4/5
