= Assassin's Creed publications =

Works based on the video game series

The Assassin's Creed series has a collection of print publications by various authors, set within the fictional universe of the Assassin's Creed video game franchise created by Ubisoft. The publications are set across various time periods and revolve around the secret war fought for centuries between the Assassin Brotherhood and the Templar Order. It includes collections such as novels, comic books and encyclopedias. British publishing house Penguin Books was responsible for most of the publications until 2020.

== Comic books ==
=== Graphic novel series (2009–2014) ===
A six volume French-language Assassin's Creed graphic novel series, written by Eric Corbeyran and illustrated by Djilalli Defaux, was released by French publisher Lex Deux Royaumes, founded by Ubisoft in 2009 as in-house comic book publishing studio. The comics have also received English-language versions in the United States and the United Kingdom, published by Titan Comics.

Like the games, the series alternates between a modern-day storyline and an Assassin ancestor storyline, and is split into two different arcs, each consisting of three volumes: The Ankh of Isis Trilogy, which follows Desmond Miles and his ancestor Aquilus, a 3rd-century Roman Assassin; and The Hawk Trilogy, which follows Jonathan Hawk and his ancestor Numa Al'Khamsin, a 14th-century Egyptian Assassin. However, the modern-day story has been declared non-canon by Ubisoft, due to directly contradicting elements from the games (such as Subject 16's name being Michael instead of Clay Kaczmarek), while the ancestor story remains of dubious canonicity.

- Assassin's Creed Volume 1: Desmond is the first entry in The Ankh of Isis Trilogy, released on November 13, 2009. An English language version was released on October 30, 2012. The story is a retelling of the events from Assassin's Creed and the beginning of Assassin's Creed II, and follows Desmond as he is abducted by Abstergo Industries and forced to relive the memories of three of his ancestors—Aquilus, Altaïr Ibn-LaʼAhad, and Ezio Auditore da Firenze—to further the Templars' goals, before escaping with the help of Lucy Stillman.
- Assassin's Creed Volume 2: Aquilus is the second entry in The Ankh of Isis Trilogy, released on November 12, 2010. An English language version was released on October 30, 2012. The story continues from the events of Volume 1, as Desmond and his Assassin team—Lucy, Shaun Hastings, and Rebecca Crane—head to a new hideout in Monteriggioni while avoiding Abstergo agents sent to hunt them down. The comic also continues the story of Aquilus, who comes across a mysterious artifact built by the First Civilization: an ankh which can temporarily revive the dead.
- Assassin's Creed, Volume 3: Accipiter is the final entry in The Ankh of Isis Trilogy, released on November 10, 2011. An English language version was released on October 30, 2012. The story continues from the events of Volume 2, and focuses on both Desmond and fellow Assassin Jonathan Hawk as they relive the memories their ancestors, Aquilus and his cousin Accipiter, respectively.
- Assassin's Creed, Volume 4: Hawk is the first entry in The Hawk Trilogy, released on November 16, 2012. An English language version was released on November 12, 2013, in the United States and November 15, 2013, in the United Kinggom. The comic continues the story of Jonathan Hawk, introduced in Volume 3, who relives the memories of his Egyptian ancestor Numa Al'Khamsin, better known as "El Cakr" (English: The Hawk), to locate a powerful artifact known as the Scepter of Aset.
- Assassin's Creed, Volume 5: El Cakr is the second entry in The Hawk Trilogy, released on October 31, 2013. An English language version was released on November 18, 2014, in the United States and November 21, 2014, in the United Kingdom. The story continues from the events of Volume 4, as Jonathan unmasks a traitor who infiltrated his Assassin cell, while El Cakr battles the Templars for possession of the Scepter of Aset.
- Assassin's Creed, Volume 6: Leila is the final entry in The Hawk Trilogy, released on October 31, 2014. An English language version was released on November 17, 2015, in the United States and November 20, 2015, in the United Kingdom. The comic concludes the stories of both Jonathan, who races against the Templars to retrieve the Scepter of Aset from its last known location, and El Cakr, who encounters a mysterious woman named Leila on his way to deliver the Scepter to the Assassins.

=== Assassin's Creed: The Fall and The Chain (2010–2012) ===
In July 2010, Ubisoft announced a three-part comic book miniseries set in the universe of Assassin's Creed as a part of their UbiWorkshop initiative. Cameron Stewart and Karl Kerschl, both winners of multiple comic book awards, were chosen by Ubisoft to work on the miniseries, titled Assassin's Creed: The Fall. Published by WildStorm, the first issue was released on November 10, 2010, followed by the second on December 1, 2010, and the third on January 12, 2011. The story alternates between the perspectives of Nikolai Orelov, an Assassin in 19th and 20th-century Russia, and his descendant Daniel Cross, a recovering alcoholic with a mysterious past who involuntarily experiences Nikolai's memories.

A graphic novel sequel to The Fall, titled Assassin's Creed: The Chain, was released on August 9, 2012. The book is also written and illustrated by Stewart and Kerschl, and concludes Nikolai's story after his retirement from the Assassin Brotherhood and immigration to the United States. It also continues the modern-day story of Daniel, now a highly respected Templar.

=== Assassin's Creed: Awakening (2013–2014) ===
Assassin's Creed: Awakening is a manga adaptation of Assassin's Creed IV: Black Flag, written by Takashi Yano and illustrated by Kenji Oiwa. It was released from August 10, 2013, to July 10, 2014.

=== Assassin's Creed: Brahman (2013) ===
Assassin's Creed: Brahman is a graphic novel written by Brendan Fletcher, with art by Cameron Stewart and Karl Kerschl. It was released on October 30, 2013. The story alternates between the perspectives of Arbaaz Mir, an Assassin fighting against the influence of the East India Company in 19th-century India, and Jot Soora, a computer programmer engaged to famous film actress Monima Das. After Jot, ashamed of his actual heritage, lies that he is a descendant of Arbaaz, he and Monima find themselves targeted by both the Assassins and Templars, who believe that Arbaaz's memories are the key to locating the long-lost Koh-i-Noor diamond, a powerful Piece of Eden.

=== Assassin's Creed: Assassins (2015–2016) ===
Assassin's Creed: Assassins is a comic book series written by Anthony Del Col and Connor McCreery, illustrated by Neil Edwards, and published by Titan Comics. Originally envisioned as an ongoing series with a planned duration of at least three years, it ran from October 14, 2015, to December 28, 2016, spanning fourteen issues and three story arcs. The first story arc (Issues No. 1–5) takes place in the late 17th century, during the Salem witch trials, with the parallel modern-day story featuring an espionage tale. The five issues were later collected and published as a trade paperback, Assassin's Creed Volume 1: Trial by Fire, on June 21, 2016. The second arc (Issues No. 6–10) is set in the Inca Empire in the 16th century, while the modern-day story revolves around the hacking collective Erudito. It was later published as Assassin's Creed Volume 2: Setting Sun on December 6, 2016. The final arc (Issues No. 11–14) takes place in Florence during the early 16th century, running parallel with a modern-day story again featuring Erudito. It was later published as Assassin's Creed Volume 3: Homecoming on May 23, 2017.

=== Assassin's Creed: Templars (2016–2017) ===
Assassin's Creed: Templars is a comic book series written by Fred Van Lente, illustrated by Dennis Calero, and published by Titan Comics. It ran for nine issues from March 23, 2016, to January 25, 2017. Similarly to its sister series, Assassin's Creed: Assassins, it is split into two story arcs. The first arc (Issues No. 1–5) is set in Shanghai in 1927 and revolves around a Templar known as the Black Cross, with the parallel modern-day story taking place in November 2013. The five issues were later published together as Assassin's Creed: Templars – Volume 1: Black Cross on December 6, 2016. The second arc (Issues No. 6–9) is set in 2016, following Juhani Otso Berg and André Bolden as they explore the memories of the latter's ancestor Jan van der Graff in 19th-century Libya. It was later published as Assassin's Creed: Templars – Volume 2: Cross of War on May 23, 2017.

=== Assassin's Creed: Last Descendants – Locus (2016) ===
Assassin's Creed: Last Descendants – Locus is a four-part comic book miniseries released as a tie-in to Matthew J. Kirby's Last Descendants novel trilogy. The miniseries is written by Ian Edginton, with art by Caspar Wijngaard, and was published by Titan Comics from September 21 to December 21, 2016. The story follows Sean Molloy, a character from the Last Descendants trilogy, who uses the Animus to relive the memories of his ancestor Tommy Greyling, a Pinkerton detective. In 1872, Greyling becomes caught in a Templar plot to steal a Precursor manuscript from the British Museum, and must work together with Evie Frye to thwart it.

=== Assassin's Creed: Conspiracies (2016–2017) ===
Assassin's Creed: Conspiracies is a two-part graphic novel series written by Guillaume Dorison and illustrated by Jean-Baptiste Hostache. The two volumes, titled Die Glocke and Project Rainbow, were published by Les Deux Royaumes in French on October 21, 2016, and December 1, 2017, respectively. English-language versions were released by Titan Comics on August 1 and September 5, 2018. Conspiracies is set during World War II, featuring the race for the Atomic Bomb, and follows a new Assassin hero named Eddie Gorm who influences the course of history in 1943.

=== Assassin's Creed: Uprising (2017–2018) ===
Assassin's Creed: Uprising is a comic book series published by Titan Comics, and the sequel to both Assassin's Creed: Assassins and Templars. Serving as the conclusion of the Phoenix Project story arc from the video games, which began with Assassin's Creed: Unity, the comic follows the Assassins' and Templars' efforts to prevent Juno's return and conquest of humanity. It ran for twelve issues from February 1, 2017, to June 13, 2018, and was written by Dan Watters and Alex Paknadel and illustrated by José Holder. The series was later released as three separate volumes, with Volume 1: Common Ground releasing on August 22, 2017, and comprising issues No. 1–4; Volume 2: Inflection Point releasing on January 30, 2018, and comprising issues No. 5–8; and Volume 3: Finale releasing on October 23, 2018, and comprising issues No. 9–12.

=== Assassin's Creed: Reflections (2017) ===
For the franchise's tenth anniversary in 2017, Ubisoft announced a four-part comic book miniseries, titled Assassin's Creed: Reflections. Each issue was written by Ian Edginton, illustrated by Valeria Favoccia, and published by Titan Comics, and presents a different narrative revolving around an established Assassin (Ezio Auditore, Altaïr Ibn-LaʼAhad, Edward Kenway, and Ratonhnaké꞉ton / Connor), as viewed by Juhani Otso Berg in the modern-day.

=== Assassin's Creed: Origins (2018) ===
Assassin's Creed: Origins is a four-part comic book miniseries based on the game of the same name. Written by Anne Toole and Anthony Del Col, with art by PJ Kaiowá, it was published by Titan Comics from March 7 to June 13, 2018. The miniseries is set after the events of the game, primarily in 30 BC in the waning days of the Ptolemaic Kingdom, with flashbacks to 44 BC following Amunet in Rome as she deals with the aftermath of Julius Caesar's assassination.

=== Assassin's Creed: Bloodstone (2019) ===
Assassin's Creed: Bloodstone is a two-part graphic novel series written by Guillaume Dorison and illustrated by Ennio Bufi. The first volume was published in French by Les Deux Royaumes on March 29, 2019, followed by the second on October 11, 2019. Titan Comics released English-language versions of the two volumes on February 18, 2020, and January 26, 2021, respectively. Bloodstone is set during the Vietnam War in the early 1960s and follows a new Assassin protagonist, Alekseï Gavrani. The modern-day storyline continues from the events of Assassin's Creed: Conspiracies, and features the Japanese Assassin Tomo Takagawa exploring Gavrani's memories.

=== Assassin's Creed: Blade of Shao Jun (2019–2021) ===
Assassin's Creed: Blade of Shao Jun (known in Japan as Assassin's Creed: China) is a manga adaptation of Assassin's Creed Chronicles: China, written and illustrated by Minoji Kurata. It has been serialized in Shogakukan's seinen manga magazine Monthly Sunday Gene-X from October 19, 2019, to June 17, 2021. The manga expands upon Shao Jun's story from the video game and also features an original modern-day plot following Shao Jun's descendant, Lisa Huang (called Kō Risa in the Japanese version).

=== Assassin's Creed: Dynasty (2020–2022) ===
Assassin's Creed: Dynasty is a manhua first serialized in August 2020 via the Tencent-owned online platform AC.QQ in collaboration with Ubisoft. Written by Xu Xianzhe with art by Zhang Xiao, the manhua is set in 755 during the Tang dynasty, and follows the journey of Li E as he joins the Hidden Ones and eventually becomes a Master Assassin.

=== Assassin's Creed: Valhalla – Song of Glory (2020) ===
Assassin's Creed: Valhalla – Song of Glory is a three-part comic book miniseries which serves as a prequel to Assassin's Creed Valhalla, following the separate exploits of Eivor Varinsdottir and her adoptive brother Sigurd Styrbjornsson in 870, two years before the events of the game. Written by Cavan Scott and illustrated by Martín Túnica, the miniseries was published by Dark Horse Comics from October 21 to December 23, 2020.

=== Assassin's Creed: Valhalla × Vinland Saga (2020) ===
Makoto Yukimura drew a 7-page crossover manga chapter between Assassin's Creed Valhalla and his series Vinland Saga that was uploaded to Ubisoft's website on October 23, 2020.

=== Assassin's Creed: Valhalla – Blood Brothers (2020–2021) ===
Assassin's Creed: Valhalla – Blood Brothers is a manhua first serialized on November 4, 2020, via the AC.QQ online platform in collaboration with Ubisoft. Written by Feng Zisu, the manhua is set in the 860s and centers on the Stensson brothers, Ulf and Björn, who follow Ivarr the Boneless to England in pursuit of glory. The original run concluded with its fifth and final chapter on June 30, 2021.

=== Assassin's Creed: Valhalla – Forgotten Myths (2022) ===
Assassin's Creed: Valhalla – Forgotten Myths is a three-part comic book miniseries which serves as a prequel to the Dawn of Ragnarök expansion for Assassin's Creed Valhalla, depicting the events that led to Baldr's capture by the Muspels. The miniseries is written by Alex Freed, with art by Martín Túnica, and was published by Dark Horse Comics from March 16 to May 11, 2022.

=== Assassin's Creed: Valhalla – The Hidden Codex (2023) ===
Assassin's Creed: Valhalla – The Hidden Codex is a French-language graphic novel written by Mathieu Gabella, illustrated by Paolo Traisci, and published in France by Glénat Editions on January 25, 2023. An English-language version was released by Dark Horse Books on April 30, 2024. Set after the events of Assassin's Creed Valhalla, the comic follows a young monk-turned-apprentice Hidden One named Edward and the Viking Niels Gunnarsson of the Raven Clan as they travel together to Scotland to solve a dangerous mystery.

=== Assassin's Creed: Forgotten Temple (2023–2026) ===
Assassin's Creed: Forgotten Temple is a webtoon which serves as a sequel to Assassin's Creed IV: Black Flag, following Edward Kenway on a new adventure in Southeast Asia in search of Pieces of Eden and the titular "Forgotten Temple". The story also features modern-day segments centered around Edward's Korean American descendant Noa Kim, who is forced to relive his ancestor's memories following his abduction by Abstergo Industries, leading him to discover more about his past and his Assassin heritage. Published by Redice Studio, the webtoon debuted with its first episode on April 25, 2023, and ran for 151 episodes until March 17, 2026.

=== Assassin's Creed: Visionaries (2023–2024) ===
Assassin's Creed: Visionaries is a comic book anthology miniseries featuring non-canon stories by various artists. Published by Studio Lounak, the series was originally envisioned as a graphic novel that sought to pay tribute to the franchise's 15th anniversary. A campaign on Kickstarter was announced in March 2023, but after the project failed to raise the necessary funds, it was re-worked into a comic book miniseries, with each issue featuring two or three stories. The first issue was released on November 29, 2023. Although originally envisioned as a four-part series, the comic concluded after its third issue on October 2, 2024.

=== Assassin's Creed: Mirage – A Soar of Eagles (2025) ===
Assassin's Creed: Mirage – A Soar of Eagles is a three-part comic book miniseries which serves as a prequel to Assassin's Creed Mirage, following Roshan and Fuladh Al Haami as they travel to the latter's hometown of Adulis to investigate a wave of political unrest possibly connected to the Order of the Ancients. The first issue of the comic was originally slated for a July 31, 2024 release, but was later delayed to March 12, 2025.

=== Assassin's Creed: Shadows – Tales of Iga (2025–2026) ===
Assassin's Creed: Shadows – Tales of Iga (Japanese: アサシン クリード シャドウズ 伊賀の物語, Assassin's Creed: Shadows – Iga no Monogatari) is a manga which serves as a prequel to Assassin's Creed Shadows, exploring the backstories of Fujibayashi Nagato, Tsuyu, and Hattori Hanzō and the formation of the first incarnation of the Kakushiba ikki. The manga began serialization in Kodansha's Weekly Young Magazine on March 20, 2025.

== Assassin's Creed: Encyclopedia ==
UbiWorkshop released an encyclopedia of the Assassin's Creed series in 2011. Initially intended as an art book, the project gathered so much material that the company decided to expand it into an encyclopedia. It features works of artists, such as Craig Mullins, Tavis Coburn, 123Klan, Gabz and James NG. Artists were given creative freedom, as they were able to create a unique Assassin from the period of their choosing. The art book contains a carte blanche section, which is going to contain fan-submitted artwork.

In November 2012, to coincide with the release of Assassin's Creed III, UbiWorkshop released a second edition of the encyclopedia. This Edition contained an additional 120 pages of content, covering both Assassin's Creed III and Assassin's Creed: The Chain, as well as revised content based on feedback.

The Third Edition of the Assassin's Creed: Encyclopedia is an updated hardcover edition incorporating information of characters and events from Assassin's Creed IV: Black Flag and Assassin's Creed: Brahman, along with new artwork and concept art. It was released worldwide on November 11, 2013, and includes 390 pages of new content and a revised version of the second edition, which is also available to purchase from UbiWorkshop.
