= Assassin's Creed: Pirates =

2013 video game

- Developer: Ubisoft Paris
- Publisher: Ubisoft
- Series: Assassin's Creed
- Engine: Cosmos Engine
- Platforms: Android; iOS
- Release: December 5, 2013
- Genre: Action-adventure
- Mode: Single-player

Assassin's Creed: Pirates is a mobile video game developed by Ubisoft Paris, and published by Ubisoft for iOS and Android devices on December 5, 2013. The game follows Captain Alonzo Batilla, who is neither Assassin nor Templar, as he commands a ship and crew, while crossing paths with the Assassins and Templars. Gameplay focuses on real-time battles between ships, and it is rendered in 3D.

== Gameplay ==
Assassin's Creed: Pirates is set during the Golden Age of Piracy, where players take the role of Alonzo Batilla, a French pirate captain. The game focuses on naval combat, similar to Assassin's Creed IV: Black Flag, and players can also manage their crew, upgrade their ship, explore and discover new areas of the Caribbean in Alonzo's ship. There is no modern-day story, the only connection being a small reference in the opening cutscene about Abstergo Entertainment discovering Alonzo's connection to La Buse and his fabled treasure.

Main story missions and many secondary missions (which reward players with experience points and resources to allow them to improve their ship or character stats) are available in each map. There is a resource cost to travel across the map, and treasures can be found on each map. When enough enemies are defeated, treasure maps will be awarded and reveal a treasure location. Lost files are spread out everywhere in the playgrounds, and appear on the in-game radar.

As players level up, crewmembers are unlocked, who can be hired directly by visiting taverns, and the player will be also granted perks to improve navigational or combat skills. New ships will be unlocked and bought with gold coins acquired during missions or free plunder. The player's bounty increases each time an enemy is defeated, resulting in bounty hunters attempting to track them down. Achievements, awarded for completing various objectives, and the number of missions completed define the player's rank.

== Development ==
Assassin's Creed: Pirates was developed using Cosmos, a game engine made by Ubisoft Mobile and Intel. The game was announced on 10 September 2013 alongside Assassin's Creed: Liberation HD, and was released on 5 December 2013. A debut trailer showcased details about the story and naval combat. The storyline is not connected to Assassin's Creed IV: Black Flag and is also separate from the Assassin's Creed IV: Black Flag companion app.

On 9 January 2014, the first update for the game introduced a new location, Nassau, while the second update, released on 7 March, included new locations and mission types: survival missions, fish and hunt whales, and two new ships. On 16 May, the third update introduced La Boca del Diablo and daily challenges. A web demo version of the game was released on 19 May, built with open-source framework Babylon.js. On 11 July, the fourth update was released, adding Isla de la Juventud as a new location.

On 4 September 2014, Assassin's Creed: Pirates became free-to-play, and a free expansion titled Cold Blood was released, which incorporates Arctic areas inspired by Assassin's Creed: Rogue. On 22 December, another expansion titled The Lost Temples was released, which gave players the opportunity to leave their ships for the first time and explore 64 hidden Mayan temples on land. The expansion also added 24 new treasure chests and 50 daily quests. During land exploration, the camera pans into first person mode as players have to swipe in any direction to avoid obstacles, which is reminiscent of the 2011 game Temple Run. On 11 June 2015, the final expansion titled Quest for Eden was released, concluding Alonzo's story and the quest for La Buse's treasure.

For Christmas 2015, update 2.6.1 added an exclusive treasure set and ship customization. On 3 February 2016, to celebrate the Chinese New Year, update 2.8.0 was released, which included another exclusive treasure set, customization options created for the event, and Blackbeard's vessel, the Queen Anne's Revenge.

On 19 February 2017, with the release of the iOS 11 update, Assassin's Creed: Pirates was quietly removed from all digital store fronts without announcement.
