= Assassin's Creed =

Video game series

- Genres: Action-adventure; Action role-playing; Stealth
- Developers: Ubisoft Montreal; Ubisoft Sofia; Ubisoft Blue Byte; Ubisoft Quebec; Ubisoft Bordeaux; Gameloft; Griptonite Games; Red Storm Entertainment
- Publisher: Ubisoft
- Creators: Patrice Désilets; Jade Raymond; Corey May
- First release: Assassin's Creed; November 13, 2007
- Latest release: Assassin's Creed Black Flag Resynced; July 9, 2026

Assassin's Creed is a historical action-adventure video game series and media franchise published by Ubisoft and developed mainly by its studio Ubisoft Montreal using the game engine Anvil and its more advanced derivatives. Created by Patrice Désilets, Jade Raymond, and Corey May, the Assassin's Creed video game series depicts a fictional millennia-old struggle between the Order of Assassins, who fight for peace and free will, and the Knights Templar, who desire peace through order and control. The series features historical fiction, science fiction, and fictional characters intertwined with real-world historical events and historical figures. In most games, players control a historical Assassin while also playing as an Assassin Initiate or someone caught in the Assassin–Templar conflict in the present-day framing story. Considered a spiritual successor to the Prince of Persia series, Assassin's Creed took inspiration from the novel Alamut by the Slovenian writer Vladimir Bartol, based on the historical Hashashin sect of medieval Iran (Persia).

The first Assassin's Creed game was released in 2007, and the series has featured fourteen main installments in total, the most recent being Assassin's Creed Shadows in 2025. Main games in the Assassin's Creed series are set in an open world and played from the third-person view. Gameplay revolves around combat, stealth, and exploration, including the use of parkour to navigate the environment. The games feature both main and side missions, and some titles also include competitive and cooperative multiplayer game modes.

A new story and occasionally new time periods are introduced in each entry, with the gameplay elements also evolving. There are three overarching story arcs in the series. The first five main games follow Desmond Miles, a descendant of several important Assassins throughout history, who uses a machine called the Animus to relive his ancestors' memories and find powerful artifacts called Pieces of Eden in an attempt to prevent a catastrophic event, referencing the 2012 phenomenon. From Assassin's Creed IV: Black Flag to Assassin's Creed Syndicate, Assassin initiates and employees of Abstergo Industries (a company used as a front by the modern-day Templars) record genetic memories using the Helix software, helping the Templars and Assassins find new Pieces of Eden in the modern world. The next three games, Assassin's Creed Origins, Odyssey, and Valhalla, follow ex-Abstergo employee Layla Hassan on her own quest to save humanity from another disaster.

The main games in the Assassin's Creed franchise have received generally positive reviews for their ambition in visuals, game design, and narratives, with criticism for the yearly release cycle and frequent bugs, as well as the prioritising of role-playing mechanics in later titles. The series has received multiple awards and nominations, including multiple Game of the Year awards. It is commercially successful, selling over 250 million copies as of July 2026, becoming Ubisoft's best-selling franchise and one of the best-selling video game franchises of all time. While main titles are produced for major consoles and desktop platforms, multiple spin-off games have been released for consoles, mobiles, and handheld platforms. A series of art books, encyclopedias, comics, and novels have also been published. A live-action film adaptation of the series was released in 2016.

== Development history ==
While the games in the series have had several narrative arcs, Ubisoft views the series as currently having three periods of development and design philosophy. Until 2015's Assassin's Creed Syndicate, the franchise was structured around single-player content, and while centering on open world spaces and incorporating several role-playing elements, the games were more action-adventure and stealth-oriented. Period two, covering from Assassin's Creed Origins to Assassin's Creed Mirage, brought in more role-playing elements and live-service features to increase player engagement. Period three launched with Assassin's Creed Shadows, using lessons from the second period of development to make engrossing single-player games similar to the original titles, but with features to allow players to share achievements and content with others through a new Animus Hub system.

=== Period one ===
The first Assassin's Creed game originated out of ideas for a sequel for Ubisoft's video game Prince of Persia: The Sands of Time, aiming for the seventh generation of video game consoles. The Ubisoft Montreal team decided to take the gameplay from The Sands of Time into an open-world approach, taking advantage of the improved processing power to render larger spaces and crowds. Narratively, the team wanted to move away from the Prince being someone next in line for the throne and instead have him work for it. Combined with research into secret societies, they ultimately chose to focus on the Order of Assassins, based upon the historical Hashashin sect of Ismaili, who were followers of Shia Islam. In developing the narrative, the team took heavy inspiration from the 1938 novel Alamut, which focuses on the Assassins under Hassan-i Sabbah during the Crusades. They initially developed a story where the player would control an Assassin escorting a non-playable Prince, leading them to call this game Prince of Persia: Assassin, or Prince of Persia: Assassins. Ubisoft was apprehensive to a Prince of Persia game without the Prince as the playable character, but this led the marketing division to suggest the name Assassin's Creed, playing off the creed of the Assassins in Alamut: "nothing is true; everything is permitted". Ubisoft Montreal ran with this in creating a new intellectual property, eliminating the Prince, and basing it around the Assassins and the Knights Templar in the Holy Land during the 12th century. Additionally, in postulating what other assassinations they could account for throughout history, they came onto the idea of genetic memory and created the Animus device and modern storyline elements. This further allowed them to explain certain facets of gameplay, such as accounting for when the player character is killed, similar to The Sands of Time.

After Assassin's Creed was released in 2007, the Ubisoft Montreal team felt that they needed to "rework the global structure" in developing the sequel, Assassin's Creed II. They believed parkour was underutilized in the first game and designed the world in the sequel to feature freerun highways to make it easier to enter into parkour moves; for example, using rooftops to escape pursuits. The change in setting meant that the game would feature a new cast of characters, including a new protagonist, Ezio Auditore da Firenze. Assassin's Creed II also brought in more use of crowds to hide in plain sight that the developers had seen used in Hitman: Blood Money, adding to the concept of social stealth as a gameplay option. Finally, Ubisoft Montreal completely reworked the repetitive mission structure from the first game through numerous side activities, collectibles, and secrets. These additions became a central part of the series going forward, as well as of other Ubisoft games like Watch Dogs, Far Cry, and Tom Clancy's Ghost Recon. Assassin's Creed II was followed by two direct sequels, Assassin's Creed: Brotherhood and Assassin's Creed: Revelations, which also featured Ezio as the main protagonist and introduced the ability for players to recruit NPCs as Assassins and manage them in missions.

Assassin's Creed III originated from both Ubisoft Montreal, who wanted to progress the series' narrative forward in time, and an unattached project that had been developed at Ubisoft Singapore and featured naval ship combat. As the main team had settled on the American Revolution period for the game, they found the ship-to-ship combat system fit with the story and redesigned the setting to incorporate it further. Another major change in Assassin's Creed III was transitioning the parkour and freerun systems to work in the natural woodlands of 18th-century Massachusetts and New York. This further allowed the addition of trees and other vegetation within the city areas themselves, not just as part of the parkour systems, but to add more varied environments, which would continue as part of the series' ongoing design.

For Assassin's Creed III's sequel, Assassin's Creed IV: Black Flag, the Ubisoft team built upon the foundation of its predecessor, particularly with regard to the naval gameplay, merging it seamlessly with the land-based gameplay. The team also used the game as a chance to address aspects of the series' storyline unexplored in previous titles. Choosing to focus on an outsider's perspective to the Assassin–Templar conflict, they set the game around the Golden Age of Piracy, with the protagonist, Edward Kenway, starting out as a pirate who initially becomes involved in the conflict with the prospect of wealth. Similarly, after the conclusion of Desmond Miles' story arc in Assassin's Creed III, the modern-day segments put players in the role of a nameless individual controlled from a first-person perspective. The team chose this approach because they believed it allowed players to more easily identify themselves in their character. This trend would continue in the series until Assassin's Creed Syndicate.

Development of Assassin's Creed Unity began shortly after the completion of Brotherhood in 2010, with the core development team splitting off during the early stages of development on Assassin's Creed III. As the first game in the series to be released exclusively for the eighth generation of video game consoles, Unity featured a graphical and gameplay overhaul. The setting chosen for the game was Paris during the early years of the French Revolution, with players taking control of a new Assassin named Arno Dorian. After Unity, Ubisoft released Assassin's Creed Syndicate in 2015.

=== Period two ===
Following Syndicate's release, Ubisoft decided that the series needed a major reinvention across both gameplay and narrative. It was decided to make the next game, Assassin's Creed Origins, closer to a role-playing video game than a stealth-action game, which would also bring a game with many more hours of play than previous titles. Some long-standing features of the series were eliminated for this purpose, such as the social stealth mechanic. This changed how missions were presented—rather than being linearly directed through the Animus, the player character could meet various quest givers in the game's world to receive missions. From the narrative side, Ubisoft placed the game before the formation of the Assassin Brotherhood in Ancient Egypt and made the player character, Bayek of Siwa, a medjay that people would respect and seek the help of. The modern-day storyline also shifted back to a single character, Layla Hassan. The developers limited the number of playable sequences for her character compared to previous games but gave them more meaning, such as allowing the player to explore Layla's laptop with background information on the games' universe.

Origins was followed in 2018 by Assassin's Creed Odyssey, which shifted the setting to Classical Greece and followed a similar approach to its predecessor but with more emphasis on the role-playing elements. 2020's Assassin's Creed Valhalla, set in medieval England and Norway during the Viking Age, continued the same style as Origins and Odyssey. The developers recognized feedback from the previous two games and brought back the social stealth elements, as well as the concept of a customizable home base that was first introduced in Assassin's Creed II. In 2023, Ubisoft released Assassin's Creed Mirage, a smaller title which sought to pay tribute to the franchise's earlier installments by focusing on stealth and assassinations over its predecessors' role-playing elements. The game started development as an expansion for Valhalla before being turned into a standalone release, and was set in 9th-century Baghdad during the Islamic Golden Age, a decade before the events of Valhalla, to which it served as a prequel.

=== Period three ===
In 2022, Ubisoft announced several additional games for the series, including Assassin's Creed Shadows, set in Japan during the Sengoku period, and Assassin's Creed: Codename Hexe, rumoured to be set in Central Europe during the 16th century.

Alongside the release of Assassin's Creed Shadows, Ubisoft introduced the Animus Hub, intended to serve as a centralized hub for the Assassin's Creed games from Shadows onward. Originally teased as Assassin's Creed Infinity, the Animus Hub was described by its executive producer, Marc-Alexis Côté, as a "new design philosophy" for the series, as well as a hub that would provide the releases of future games. According to Côté in 2024, the modern-day narrative of the series had become haphazard after the death of Desmond Miles in Assassin's Creed III through the introduction of Layla Hassan in Assassin's Creed Origins due to the lack of a main character and the number of studios involved, and Infinity aimed to re-establish the modern-day side of the series. The Animus Hub is not a launcher, but instead a feature integrated into Shadows, future games, and select games from period two, which incorporates the modern-day storyline of the series.

As part of Ubisoft's financial troubles in the early 2020s, Ubisoft and Tencent created a separate subsidiary, Vantage Studios, in 2025 for handling Assassin's Creed and the other major Ubisoft franchises, Far Cry and Rainbow Six. As part of this, Côté left Ubisoft in October 2025, which he claimed was due to the series lead being transferred from him to a new position within Vantage Studios.

== Gameplay ==
An Assassin's Creed III demo showing the parkour gameplay

The Assassin's Creed games are centered around one or more fictional members of the Order of the Assassins. Their memories are experienced by an in-game character in the modern-day period through a device called the Animus and its derivations. The Animus allows the user to explore these memories passed down via genetics. Within the context of the game, this provides a diegetic interface to the real-world player of the game, showing them elements like health bars, a mini-map, and target objectives as if presented by the Animus. Additionally, should the player cause the historical character to die or fail a mission, this is rectified as desynchronization of the genetic memory, allowing the player to try the mission again. Through the Animus interface, the player can retry any past mission already completed; for example, in Assassin's Creed: Brotherhood, the player achieves better synchronization results by performing the mission in a specific manner, such as by only killing the mission's target. The Animus also imparts special abilities to the modern-day character that helps them see their target in a crowd or other unique points of interest.

While playing as the Assassin characters, the games are generally presented from a third-person view in an open world environment, focusing on stealth and parkour. The games use a mission structure to follow the main story, assigning the player to complete an assassination of public figureheads or a covert mission. Alternatively, several side missions are available, such as mapping out the expansive cities from a high perch followed by performing a "Leap of Faith" into a haystack below, collecting treasures hidden across the cities, exploring ruins for relics, building a Brotherhood of Assassins to perform other tasks, or funding the rebuilding of a city through the purchasing and upgrading of shops and other features. At times, the player is in direct control of the modern-day character who, by nature of the Animus use, has learned Assassin techniques through the Bleeding Effect, as well as their genetic ability of Eagle Vision, which separates friend, foe, and assassination targets by illuminating people in different colors.

The games use the concept of active versus passive moves, with active moves, such as running, climbing the sides of buildings, or jumping between rooftops, more likely to alert the attention of nearby guards. When the guards become alerted, the player must either fight them or break their line of sight and locate a hiding place, such as a haystack or a well, and wait until the guards' alert is reduced. The combat system allows for a number of unique weapons, armor, and moves, including the use of a hidden blade set in a bracer attached at the Assassin's wrist with a blade ejected via-spring mechanism, which can be used to perform surreptitious assassinations.

== Storyline ==
The logo of the fictional Abstergo Industries, whose slogan is "We change the world. Every day, in a hundred different ways."

=== Premise ===
The Assassin's Creed games primarily revolve around the rivalry and conflict between two ancient secret societies: the Order of Assassins, who represent freedom, and the Knights Templar, who represent order. Versions of these societies have existed for centuries, with the Assassins seeking to stop the Templars from gaining control of the Pieces of Eden, artifacts that can override free will to control people's minds.

These artifacts are remnants of an ancient species pre-dating humanity called the Isu, or Precursors, which created humanity to live in peace alongside them. The Isu ensured humans could not rise against them by creating the Pieces of Eden to control them. When the first hybrid Isu-human beings emerged, named Adam and Eve, they were immune to the effects of the Pieces of Eden. They stole the Pieces of Eden, which led to a great war that ended when a massive solar flare devastated the surface of the Earth. The surviving Isu subsequently died out while humanity thrived. All that remained of the Isu were traces of their memories in the world's mythologies and religions, while the Pieces of Eden became lost to time, many of them hidden within underground vaults known as Temples.

Before their demise, three Isu—Minerva, Juno, and Jupiter—attempted to prepare humanity for another solar flare they knew would come millennia later. Using a device called the Eye, which allowed them to see into possible futures, Minerva and Jupiter left behind messages to guide humanity to the Grand Temple, which housed the global aurora borealis device that could activate a protective shield around the Earth. However, Juno saw humanity as a threat and attempted to sabotage Minerva and Jupiter's plan. Minerva and Jupiter were forced to destroy Juno and trapped her consciousness within the Grand Temple, unaware that Juno had modified the global aurora borealis device to release her consciousness upon activation.

The series itself takes place in the modern era, in which the Templars have established the mega-corporation Abstergo Industries. Abstergo has developed a device, the Animus, whose users can relive the memories of their ancestors through their genetic material. Abstergo has kidnapped people who are descendants of past Assassins to locate hidden Pieces of Eden via the Animus. A user of the Animus can move about in simulated memories as their ancestor, but performing actions outside the bounds of what their ancestor did can lead to desynchronization of the memory. Extended use of the Animus creates a "Bleeding Effect" that gives users some of the skills and capabilities they experienced with their ancestors, but also affects their mental well-being, as the users begin to confuse their ancestors' memories with their own.

=== Story arcs ===
Narrative chronology of the Assassin's Creed games
Game	Historical character Period/era	Present-day character
Assassin's Creed	Altaïr Ibn-LaʼAhad; Third Crusade	Desmond Miles
Assassin's Creed II	Ezio Auditore da Firenze; Italian Renaissance	Desmond Miles
Assassin's Creed: Brotherhood	Ezio Auditore da Firenze; Italian Renaissance	Desmond Miles
Assassin's Creed Revelations	Ezio Auditore da Firenze; Ottoman Civil War; Altaïr Ibn-LaʼAhad; Mongol invasion of the Levant	Desmond Miles
Assassin's Creed III	Haytham Kenway; French and Indian War; Ratonhnhaké:ton / Connor; American Revolution	Desmond Miles
Assassin's Creed IV: Black Flag	Edward Kenway; Golden Age of Piracy	"Noob" / Abstergo researcher
Assassin's Creed Rogue	Shay Patrick Cormac; French and Indian War	"Numbskull" / Helix researcher
Assassin's Creed Unity	Arno Dorian; French Revolution	"The Initiate" / Helix player
Assassin's Creed Syndicate	Jacob and Evie Frye; Victorian England; Lydia Frye; World War I	"The Initiate" / Helix player
Assassin's Creed Origins	Bayek and Aya; Ptolemaic Egypt	Layla Hassan
Assassin's Creed Odyssey	Alexios / Kassandra; Peloponnesian War	Layla Hassan
Assassin's Creed Valhalla	Eivor Varinsdottir; Viking invasion of England; Odin / Havi; Isu Era	Layla Hassan; Basim Ibn Ishaq
Assassin's Creed Mirage	Basim Ibn Ishaq; Islamic Golden Age	—N/a
Assassin's Creed Shadows	Fujibayashi Naoe and Yasuke; Sengoku period	—N/a

The first five main games in the series focus on Desmond Miles, a runaway who learns he is a descendant of several important Assassins throughout history, including Altaïr Ibn-LaʼAhad, from the Middle East during the Third Crusade; Ezio Auditore da Firenze, from the Renaissance-era Florence; and Ratonhnhaké:ton (commonly known as Connor), a half-Mohawk, half-British Assassin operating during the American Revolution. Desmond is used by Abstergo to find Pieces of Eden but is rescued by Lucy Stillman, an undercover agent for the Assassins. With the help of two other Assassins, Shaun Hastings and Rebecca Crane, and later William Miles, Desmond's father and the leader of the modern-day Assassins, the group continue to explore Desmond's genetic memories in the hopes of locating the Pieces of Eden before Abstergo. In the process, they learn more about the Isu and come into contact with Juno, who forces Desmond to kill Lucy, revealed to be a double agent for the Templars. The group ultimately finds the Grand Temple, and Desmond activates the global aurora borealis device in time to block the solar flare destined to destroy life on Earth, at the cost of his own life.

Starting with Assassin's Creed IV: Black Flag, Abstergo has refined the Animus technology to allow anyone to experience memories from the genetic material of another person, allowing the Templars to continue their search for Pieces of Eden under the guise of creating entertainment products. In Black Flag, players assume the role of an unnamed Abstergo employee tasked with researching the memories of Edward Kenway, a pirate-turned-Assassin and Connor's grandfather. During their work, the player is blackmailed by a fellow employee, John Standish, into acquiring and delivering sensitive information on Abstergo's activities to the Assassins. John is later revealed to be a Sage, a human reincarnation of Juno's husband Aita, who is trying to resurrect her, though he is killed by Abstergo before he can succeed.

By the time of Assassin's Creed Unity, Abstergo has begun distributing the Animus technology via a video game console called the Helix, tapping into an extensive, unaware player base to help them locate the remains of various Sages as part of the Phoenix Project, an attempt to recreate the genetic structure of the Isu. The player character is recruited by the Assassins and tasked with exploring the memories of Arno Dorian, an Assassin during the French Revolution, so that the modern-day Assassins can retrieve the body of a Sage and hide it from Abstergo. Despite the Assassins' efforts, by the start of Assassin's Creed Syndicate, Abstergo has collected enough DNA samples from other Sages to move forward with the Phoenix Project. The player character is again contacted by the Assassins and relives the memories of Jacob and Evie Frye, twin Assassins from Victorian England, to find a Piece of Eden that Abstergo requires for the next phase of the Phoenix Project. Although the Assassins beat the Templars to it, the latter manage to steal the Piece of Eden and escape with it, whereupon it is revealed that Juno is manipulating various Abstergo employees to further her plans of being resurrected. (Note: This story arc was later concluded in the 2017–2018 Assassin's Creed: Uprising comic book miniseries, in which the Assassins and Templars form a truce to defeat Juno's followers, the Instruments of the First Will, and stop their plans to resurrect her.)

A new storyline is introduced in Assassin's Creed Origins focusing on Abstergo researcher Layla Hassan. While on an assignment to recover an artifact from Egypt, Layla stumbles upon the remains of the Medjay Bayek and his wife Aya, co-founders of the Hidden Ones, the Assassins' precursors. Against Abstergo's orders, Layla uses her personal Animus to relive Bayek's and Aya's memories, causing the Templars to mark her for death. She is rescued by William Miles, who then invites her to join the Assassins. In Assassin's Creed Odyssey, Layla recovers the Spear of Leonidas, an Isu artifact from which she extracts the DNA of Leonidas' grandchildren, Alexios and Kassandra. Through their memories, Layla locates the Staff of Hermes Trismegistus, another Piece of Eden, which is guarded by one of the siblings (canonically Kassandra), still alive due to being sustained by the Staff. Kassandra relinquishes the Staff to Layla, who is prophesied to one day restore balance to the world, and passes away.

In Assassin's Creed Valhalla, Earth is facing yet another disaster; its magnetic field has been continually strengthening since Desmond's activation of the global aurora borealis device eight years prior. Layla exhumes the remains of Eivor Varinsdottir, a 9th-century Viking and. from her memories, learns of an Isu temple in Norway. Layla travels to the temple and enters the Grey, a virtual world created by the Isu, where she meets both the Reader (implied to be Desmond's preserved consciousness) and Basim Ibn Ishaq, a Hidden One and the reincarnation of the Isu Loki, who was trapped in the Grey by Eivor. Basim helps Layla stop the disaster but then abandons her in the Grey and escapes back to the real world, where he joins the modern-day Assassins. In Assassin's Creed Mirage, the Assassins use a sample of Basim's DNA to relive his memories of his time as a Hidden One during the Islamic Golden Age, in order to learn more about his nature as a reborn Isu. In Assassin's Creed Shadows, the Assassins relive the memories of Fujibayashi Naoe, a shinobi Assassin, and Yasuke, a samurai, during Japan's Azuchi–Momoyama period in the late sixteenth century. Unlike previous installments, the game does not introduce a new Isu artifact or significantly advance the Isu storyline, instead establishing a new direction for the modern-day narrative through the Animus Hub. However, Naoe eventually discovers Isu-related glyphs and an ancient Isu structure, prompting her to establish contact with the Assassin Brotherhood.

== Release history ==
Release timeline Bold text for main installments
2007	Assassin's Creed
2008	Assassin's Creed: Altaïr's Chronicles
2009	Assassin's Creed II
2009	Assassin's Creed: Bloodlines
2009	Assassin's Creed II: Discovery
2010	Assassin's Creed: Brotherhood
2010	Assassin's Creed: Project Legacy
2011	Assassin's Creed: Revelations
2011	Assassin's Creed: Multiplayer Rearmed
2011	Assassin's Creed: Recollection
2012	Assassin's Creed III
2012	Assassin's Creed III: Liberation
2013	Assassin's Creed IV: Black Flag
2013	Assassin's Creed: Pirates
2014	Assassin's Creed Rogue
2014	Assassin's Creed Unity
2014	Assassin's Creed: Freedom Cry
2014	Assassin's Creed Memories
2015	Assassin's Creed Syndicate
2015	Assassin's Creed Chronicles: China
2016	Assassin's Creed Chronicles: India
2016	Assassin's Creed Chronicles: Russia
2016	Assassin's Creed Identity
2016	Assassin's Creed The Ezio Collection
2017	Assassin's Creed Origins
2017	Assassin's Creed Unity: Arno's Chronicles
2018	Assassin's Creed Rogue Remastered
2018	Assassin's Creed Odyssey
2018	Assassin's Creed Rebellion
2019	Assassin's Creed III Remastered
2020	Assassin's Creed Valhalla
2021
2022
2023	Assassin's Creed Mirage
2023	Assassin's Creed Nexus VR
2024
2025	Assassin's Creed Shadows
2026	Assassin's Creed Black Flag Resynced

Assassin's Creed main chronology
- Odyssey (431-422 BCE) (Note: BCE means Before the Common Era) (Note: Note: Most titles span multiple years with some titles running concurrently with others. Also most if not all main line titles have modern day sections, these are not included in this timeline)
- Origins (49-43 BCE)
- Mirage (861 CE) (Note: CE means Common Era)
- Valhalla (872-878 CE)
- Altaïr's Chronicles (1190 CE)
- Assassin's Creed (1191 CE)
- Bloodlines (1191 CE)
- II (1476-1499 CE)
- Discovery (1491 CE)
- Brotherhood (1499-1507 CE)
- Identity (1501-1506 CE)
- Project Legacy (1500's) (Note: Multiple Era's)
- Revelations (1511-1512 CE)
- Chronicles: China (1526-1532 CE)
- Shadows (1579-1581 CE)
- Black Flag (1715-1722 CE)
- Pirates (1715 CE)
- Freedom Cry (1735-1737 CE)
- Rogue (1752-1760 CE)
- III (1754-1783 CE)
- Liberation (1765-1777 CE)
- Unity (1789-1794 CE)
- Chronicles: India (1841 CE)
- Syndicate (1868 CE, 1916 CE)
- Chronicles: Russia (1918 CE)

The following table lists the main and spin-off games of the franchise, along with their release years and the respective platform(s) they released on:

Main series
Title	Released	Platform
Assassin's Creed	2007	Microsoft Windows, Xbox 360, PlayStation 3
Assassin's Creed II	2009	Windows, Xbox 360, Xbox One, PlayStation 3, PlayStation 4, OS X, Nintendo Switch
Assassin's Creed: Brotherhood	2010	Windows, Xbox 360, Xbox One, PlayStation 3, PlayStation 4, OS X, Nintendo Switch
Assassin's Creed Revelations	2011	Windows, Xbox 360, Xbox One, PlayStation 3, PlayStation 4, Nintendo Switch
Assassin's Creed III	2012	Windows, Xbox 360, Xbox One, PlayStation 3, PlayStation 4, Wii U, Nintendo Switch, Stadia
Assassin's Creed IV: Black Flag	2013	Windows, Xbox 360, Xbox One, PlayStation 3, PlayStation 4, Wii U, Nintendo Switch, Stadia
Assassin's Creed Rogue	2014	Windows, Xbox 360, Xbox One, PlayStation 3, PlayStation 4, Nintendo Switch, Stadia
Assassin's Creed Unity	2014	Windows, Xbox One, PlayStation 4, Stadia
Assassin's Creed Syndicate	2015	Windows, Xbox One, PlayStation 4, Stadia
Assassin's Creed Origins	2017	Windows, Xbox One, PlayStation 4, Stadia
Assassin's Creed Odyssey	2018	Windows, Xbox One, PlayStation 4, Stadia
Assassin's Creed Valhalla	2020	Windows, Xbox One, Xbox Series X/S, PlayStation 4, PlayStation 5, Stadia
Assassin's Creed Mirage	2023	Windows, Xbox One, Xbox Series X/S, PlayStation 4, PlayStation 5, iOS
Assassin's Creed Shadows	2025	Windows, Xbox Series X/S, PlayStation 5, macOS, Nintendo Switch 2
Spin-offs
Title	Released	Platform
Assassin's Creed: Altaïr's Chronicles	2008	Android, Symbian, iOS, webOS, Windows Phone, Nintendo DS
Assassin's Creed: Bloodlines	2009	PlayStation Portable
Assassin's Creed II: Discovery	2009	iOS, Nintendo DS
Assassin's Creed: Project Legacy	2010	Browser
Assassin's Creed: Multiplayer Rearmed	2011	iPad, iPhone, iPod Touch
Assassin's Creed: Recollection	2011	iPad, iPhone, iPod Touch
Assassin's Creed III: Liberation^{a}	2012	Windows, Xbox 360, Xbox One, PlayStation 3, PlayStation 4, PlayStation Vita, Nintendo Switch, Stadia
Assassin's Creed: Pirates	2013	Android, iOS
Assassin's Creed Freedom Cry^{b}	2014	Windows, Xbox 360, Xbox One, PlayStation 3, PlayStation 4, Nintendo Switch
Assassin's Creed: Memories	2014	iOS
Assassin's Creed Chronicles: China^{c}	2015	Windows, Xbox One, PlayStation 4, PlayStation Vita^{d}
Assassin's Creed Chronicles: India	2016	Windows, Xbox One, PlayStation 4, PlayStation Vita^{d}
Assassin's Creed Chronicles: Russia	2016	Windows, Xbox One, PlayStation 4, PlayStation Vita^{d}
Assassin's Creed Identity	2016	Android, iOS
Assassin's Creed Unity: Arno's Chronicles	2017	Android^{e}
Assassin's Creed Rebellion	2018	Android, iOS
Assassin's Creed Nexus VR	2023	Meta Quest 2, Meta Quest 3, Meta Quest Pro
Remasters
Title	Released	Platform
Assassin's Creed: The Ezio Collection	2016	PS4, Xbox One, Nintendo Switch
Assassin's Creed Rogue Remastered	2018	PS4, Xbox One
Assassin's Creed III Remastered	2019	Windows, PS4, Xbox One, Nintendo Switch, Google Stadia
Remakes
Title	Released	Platform
Assassin's Creed Black Flag Resynced	2026	Windows, Xbox Series X/S, PlayStation 5

^aReleased under the title Assassin's Creed: Liberation HD for Windows, PlayStation 3 and Xbox 360 in 2014.
^bOriginally released as DLC for all versions of Assassin's Creed IV: Black Flag in 2013.
^cOriginally announced as part of the season pass for Assassin's Creed Unity.
^dReleased as a compilation titled Assassin's Creed Chronicles Trilogy Pack.
^eReleased exclusively for the Honor 9 smartphone.

=== Main series ===
==== Assassin's Creed ====
Assassin's Creed logo

The first game in the series was released in November 2007 for the PlayStation 3 and Xbox 360, and in April 2008 for Microsoft Windows. It features a historical recreation of the Holy Land (primarily the cities of Masyaf, Jerusalem, Acre, and Damascus) in the late 12th century, and its narrative includes real historical figures and events from the time period. The storyline consists of two portions: one set during the modern-day, which follows Desmond Miles; and one set in 1191, which follows Desmond's ancestor, Altaïr Ibn-LaʼAhad, a member of the Assassin Order during the time of the Third Crusade. Desmond's story begins with his abduction by Abstergo Industries, whose lead scientist, Dr. Warren Vidic, forces him to explore Altaïr's memories through a machine called the Animus that allows him to connect with his ancestors' DNA. In doing so, Abstergo hopes to find powerful artifacts called Pieces of Eden, which the Assassins and their rivals, the Knights Templar, have fought over for centuries. Altaïr's story begins with his demotion after he botches an attempt by the Assassins to recover a Piece of Eden, the Apple of Eden, from the Templars. To redeem himself, Altaïr is tasked with assassinating nine Templar targets across the Holy Land.

Assassin's Creed introduced core elements that remained in the rest of the series. Players can freely explore the game's open world, making use of Altaïr's parkour and climbing skills to navigate the environment. The game also features refined hack-and-slash combat, with players able to block and counter attacks, and stealth mechanics, such as hiding in crowds of people, which allow players to avoid detection by enemies or lose pursuing foes. Although players can choose the order in which they kill their main targets, the mission design was seen as linear and repetitive because players had to complete several side quests before each assassination. The side mission prerequisite was one of the most criticized aspects of the game, so it was abandoned in future installments.

==== Assassin's Creed II ====
Assassin's Creed II logo

Assassin's Creed II is a direct sequel to the first game and was released in November 2009 for the PlayStation 3 and Xbox 360, in March 2010 for Windows, and in October 2010 for OS X. The modern-day narrative again follows Desmond, who escapes from Abstergo (revealed at the end of the previous game as a front for the modern-day Templars) with the aid of the Assassin mole Lucy Stillman and is taken to her team's hideout. Hoping to train Desmond as an Assassin, they put him in the Animus 2.0, where he begins to experience the Bleeding Effect; this allows Desmond to gain his ancestors' skills, at the cost of his declining mental health, as his ancestors' memories slowly overwrite his own. The main narrative takes place at the height of the Italian Renaissance in the late 15th century and follows Desmond's ancestor Ezio Auditore da Firenze, a young nobleman from Florence who is forced to become an Assassin after his father and brothers are killed by the Templars. During his journey to avenge their deaths, Ezio makes allies such as Leonardo da Vinci and Caterina Sforza and combats enemies such as the Pazzi family and Rodrigo Borgia. Ezio also comes into contact with technology left behind by the First Civilization, a race that created humanity and the Pieces of Eden and was wiped out by a catastrophic event.

Similar to the first game, Assassin's Creed II incorporates historical events into its narrative and features recreations of several cities from the time period it is set in (in this case, Florence, Venice, Forlì, San Gimignano, and Monteriggioni). Missions are divided into main story missions, themselves divided into memory sequences reflecting points in Ezio's life, and side missions that can be accomplished at any time; this approach to mission structure remains consistent across the series. The Villa Auditore in Monteriggioni, which acts as Ezio's home base for most of the game, provides several functions that can be expanded by paying for upgrades of surrounding buildings, or by purchasing artwork, weapons, and armor for the villa; in turn, the villa will generate wealth for the player at a rate influenced by the upgrades and acquisition of these items.

==== Assassin's Creed: Brotherhood ====
Assassin's Creed: Brotherhood logo

Assassin's Creed: Brotherhood is the sequel to Assassin's Creed II, and was released in November 2010 for the PlayStation 3 and Xbox 360, in March 2011 for Windows, and in May 2011 for OS X. The game begins immediately after the events of its predecessor, at the end of which Desmond was warned by Minerva, a member of the First Civilization, about a solar flare that will hit the Earth and wipe out humanity in a few months. Desmond and his team travel to Monteriggioni, where they set up a new hideout and use the Animus to continue exploring Ezio's memories in search of his Apple of Eden, which they believe is the key to stopping the solar flare. The main narrative continues from the events of Assassin's Creed II, as Ezio travels to Rome, the center of Templar power in Italy, to re-establish the Assassin Brotherhood and defeat the Borgias, who have attacked Monteriggioni and stolen the Apple of Eden.

Brotherhood shares many of the same features as the previous game, though it takes place primarily in one city: Rome. Like the Villa Auditore, players can buy and upgrade shops and other facilities throughout the city to increase its overall revenue. However, in order to gain access to these facilities, they must first destroy Borgia towers that control various sections of the city. The Brotherhood of Assassins is introduced, allowing Ezio to rescue civilians from certain events, recruit them into the Brotherhood, and train them as Assassins; these Assassins can then be sent on missions across Europe to gain experience, or be called to help the player directly during a mission. For the first time in the series, the game features online multiplayer, in which players assume the role of Abstergo employees who relive the genetic memories of Renaissance Templars in various game modes. Brotherhood was the last game to feature Assassin's Creed creator Patrice Désilets as the creative director of the series.

==== Assassin's Creed Revelations ====
Assassin's Creed Revelations logo

Assassin's Creed Revelations is the final installment of the Ezio Trilogy and was released in November 2011 for the PlayStation 3, Xbox 360, and Windows. Following the events of Brotherhood, where he was forced by Juno to kill Lucy (who, unbeknownst to him, was a Templar double agent), Desmond has fallen into a coma and was put back into the Animus to save his mind. Within the computerized core of the Animus, Desmond meets the preserved consciousness of Abstergo's previous test subject, Clay Kaczmarek, who explains that Desmond's mind must achieve full synchronization with Altaïr and Ezio, or else he will fall into dementia. Desmond continues exploring the memories of Ezio, who, a few years after the events of Brotherhood, travels to Constantinople to find five keys needed to open a library built by Altaïr, which is said to contain the power to end the Assassin–Templar conflict. In Constantinople, Ezio becomes caught in a war of succession between Sultan Bayezid II's sons, Selim and Ahmet, and must confront a conspiracy masterminded by the Byzantine Templars, who are taking advantage of the chaos to try and reclaim the city.

Originally Revelations was announced as Assassin's Creed: Lost Legacy, and conceptualized as a Nintendo 3DS title focusing on Ezio traveling to Masyaf to explore Altaïr's legacy and uncover the origins of the Assassin Brotherhood. Lost Legacy was later announced as cancelled on July 15, 2011, after Ubisoft decided to expand the idea further, cancel the 3DS development, and shift all development duties towards PlayStation 3, Xbox 360 and PC to release the game as a full-fledged main installment. The original premise remained and evolved into the plot seen in the final game. Included were many new systems and additional weapons such as bomb-crafting and an expanded Assassin recruitment system. The multiplayer mode returns in Revelations, with more characters, modes, and maps; players once again assume the role of Templars in training and, as they level up and rise in the ranks, they are told more about Abstergo's history.

==== Assassin's Creed III ====
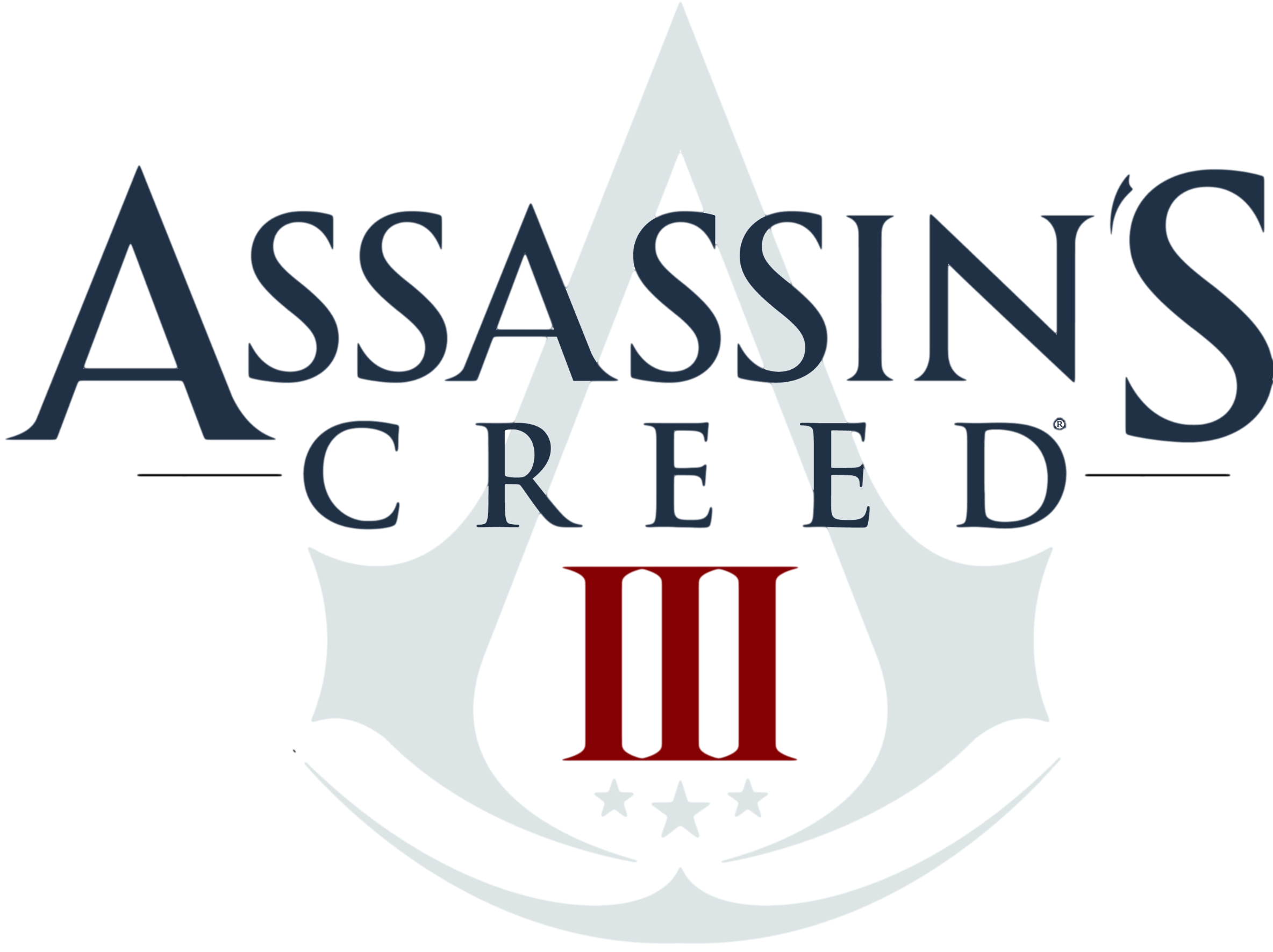
Assassin's Creed III logo

Assassin's Creed III was released in October 2012 for the PlayStation 3 and Xbox 360 and in November 2012 for Wii U and Windows. A remastered version of the game with enhanced visuals was released for Windows, PlayStation 4, and Xbox One in March 2019, and for Nintendo Switch in May 2019. This is the final game in the series to follow Desmond, who travels to the First Civilization's Grand Temple in New York in search of the technology needed to prevent the solar flare set to hit the Earth soon. Discovering he needs a key to access the Temple's inner chambers, Desmond uses the Animus to relive the memories of two of his ancestors who were in possession of the key at various points in time: Haytham Kenway, a British Templar from the 18th century who travels to the American colonies to find the Grand Temple; and Ratonhnhaké:ton (later known as Connor), Haytham's half-Mohawk son, who becomes an Assassin to exact revenge on the Templars, whom he blames for the destruction of his village and the death of his mother. To this end, Connor later becomes involved in the American Revolution, helping the Patriot cause while clashing with Haytham's faction of Templars, who hope to use the Revolution to further their own goals.

Assassin's Creed III is structured similarly to the previous games, with missions taking place in an open-world map based on Colonial Boston and New York. The game offers a large wilderness area in the form of the Frontier and the Davenport Homestead, where the player can hunt animals for materials, which subsequently can be used to construct goods to be traded and sold throughout the colonies. Naval battles also debut in the series, wherein the player must steer a warship named the Aquila in dangerous waters and perform ship-to-ship combat with cannons and mounted guns. The multiplayer mode from the previous two games returns in Assassin's Creed III with new game modes, characters, and maps inspired by Colonial America, but this time no major narrative elements are included.

==== Assassin's Creed IV: Black Flag ====
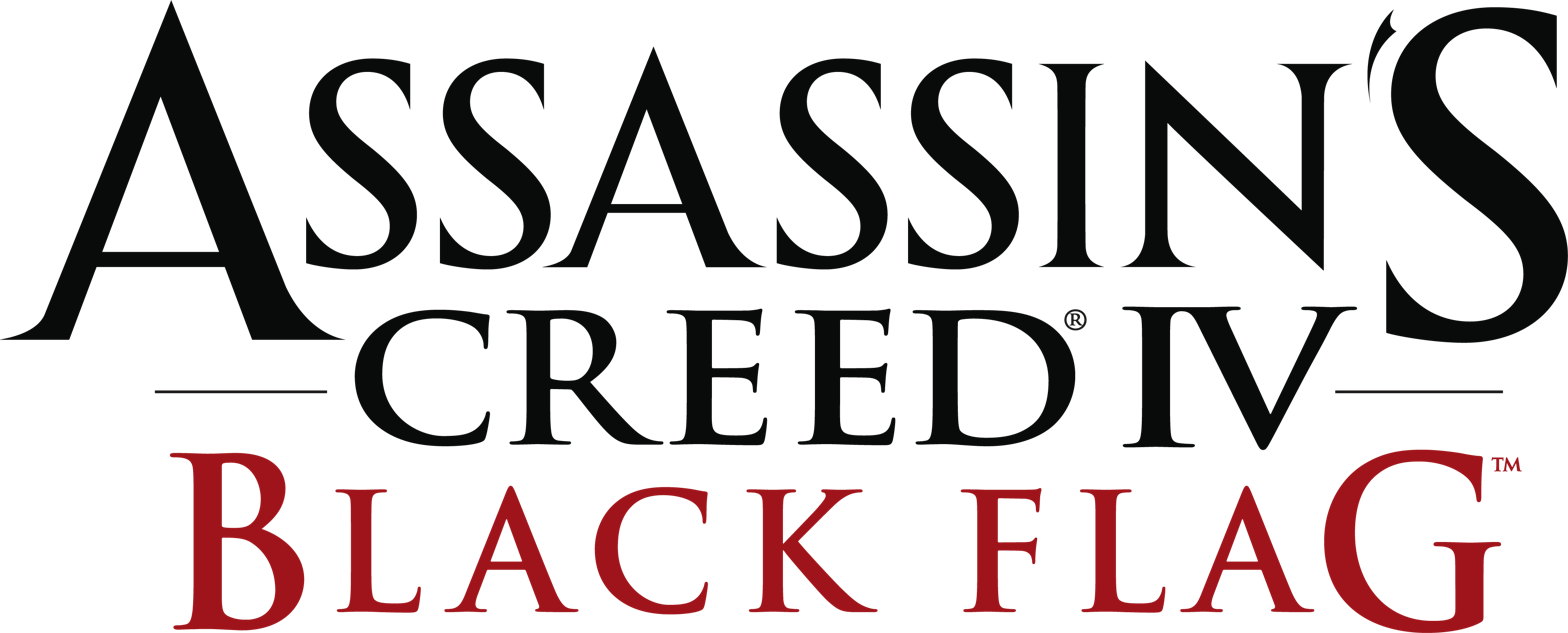
Assassin's Creed IV: Black Flag logo

Assassin's Creed IV: Black Flag was released in October 2013 for the PlayStation 3, Xbox 360, and Wii U and in November 2013 for the PlayStation 4, Xbox One, and Windows. Following the events of Assassin's Creed III, at the end of which Desmond sacrificed himself to save the Earth, Abstergo retrieved samples from his body to continue exploring the memories of his ancestors. The player character is an unnamed Abstergo employee tasked with analyzing the memories of Edward Kenway, an 18th-century pirate and Connor's grandfather, ostensibly to gather material for an Animus-powered interactive feature film; in reality, Abstergo are searching for the Observatory, a First Civilization structure that allows the user to see through the eyes of a subject to find them anywhere on the planet. As Edward, the player must unravel a conspiracy between high-ranking Templars to manipulate the British and Spanish empires into locating the Sage—later identified as Bartholomew Roberts—who is the only man that can lead them to the Observatory.

Black Flag retains many gameplay mechanics from Assassin's Creed III, including the ship-based exploration and combat. For the first time in the series, naval exploration is a major part of the game; players can captain Edward's ship, the Jackdaw, and battle rival ships or hunt sea animals. The game includes a large open world spanning the West Indies, with players able to explore the cities of Havana, Nassau, and Kingston, as well as numerous islands, forts, and sunken ships. A multiplayer mode is once again included, although it is entirely land-based.

==== Assassin's Creed Rogue ====
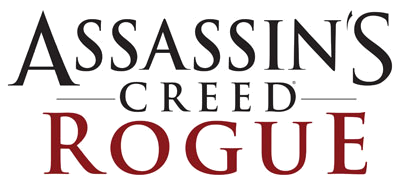
Assassin's Creed Rogue logo

Assassin's Creed Rogue is the final game in the series to be developed for the seventh generation of consoles, being released for the PlayStation 3 and Xbox 360 in November 2014, and for Windows in March 2015. A remastered version of the game was released for the PlayStation 4 and Xbox One in March 2018. In the present day, players again take on the role of an unnamed Abstergo employee, tasked with researching the memories of Shay Patrick Cormac, an 18th-century Assassin who, for reasons unknown to Abstergo, defected to the Templars. During their investigation, the player accidentally trips a hidden memory file that infects the Animus servers. They must complete Shay's memories to clean the servers while Abstergo is put under lockdown. The main narrative takes place during the Seven Years' War, and follows Shay, who starts out as a talented, but insubordinate Assassin trainee. After witnessing the Assassins' hypocrisy and willingness to sacrifice civilians in their blind pursuit of Pieces of Eden, Shay betrays them and joins the Templars, helping his newfound allies hunt down members of his former Brotherhood to prevent them from endangering more innocent lives. Shay's story is set between the events of Assassin's Creed IV: Black Flag and Assassin's Creed III, and is meant to fill the gaps between their respective narratives, while also having "a crucial link to the Kenway saga" according to Ubisoft, as well as to Assassin's Creed Unity. Several major characters from Assassin's Creed III and Black Flag make appearances in the game, such as Haytham Kenway, Achilles Davenport, and Adéwalé.

In March 2014, a new Assassin's Creed game code-named Comet was revealed to be in development for the PlayStation 3 and Xbox 360, set to release later that year alongside Unity. By the end of the month, additional reports indicated that Comet would be set around 1758 New York City, and would feature sailing on the Atlantic Ocean. The game would be a direct sequel to Black Flag, and would be the first to feature a Templar as the main protagonist. In May 2014, Guillemot stated that, "for the foreseeable future", Assassin's Creed games would continue releasing on the last generation PlayStation 3 and Xbox 360, despite the franchise moving to the current generation PlayStation 4 and Xbox One with Unity. On August 5, Ubisoft officially announced the game as Assassin's Creed Rogue. While the game reuses many assets from Black Flag, a number of new systems and weapons were included, such as an air rifle and refined naval combat, and the multiplayer aspect has been removed.

==== Assassin's Creed Unity ====
Assassin's Creed Unity logo

Assassin's Creed Unity was released concurrently with Rogue in November 2014 for the PlayStation 4, Xbox One and Windows, and in December 2020 for Google Stadia. In the present-day, the player character is a player of Helix, an Animus-powered gaming device produced by Abstergo, who hope to use their unaware player base to locate more Pieces of Eden. While playing, the player is contacted by the modern-day Assassins and invited to join them as an Initiate and help them locate the body of an 18th-century Sage. The main story is set in Paris during the French Revolution, and follows the Assassin Arno Dorian as he embarks on a quest for redemption after his foster father's death, which leads him to discover an internal conflict between the Templars as a result of the Revolution.

On March 19, 2014, images leaked for the next Assassin's Creed game, titled or code-named Unity, showing a new Assassin in Paris. On March 21, Ubisoft confirmed the game's existence, having been in development for more than three years, by releasing pre-alpha game footage. The game features enhanced visuals compared to its predecessors, and several new gameplay mechanics, including a four player co-op mode, a first for the series.

==== Assassin's Creed Syndicate ====
Assassin's Creed Syndicate logo

Assassin's Creed Syndicate was released in October 2015 for the PlayStation 4 and Xbox One, in November 2015 for Windows, and in December 2020 for the Stadia. In the present-day, players control the same unnamed Assassin Initiate from Assassin's Creed Unity, who this time must help the Assassins find a Shroud of Eden hidden in London. The main story is set in Victorian era London and follows twin Assassins Jacob and Evie Frye as they navigate the corridors of organized crime to take back the city from Templar control and prevent them from finding the Shroud. The narrative also includes segments set in war-torn London during World War I, which follow Jacob's granddaughter, Lydia Frye, as she battles German soldiers and Templar spies and searches for a Sage.

In December 2014, images and information leaked for a new Assassin's Creed game, titled or code-named Victory, which was later confirmed by Ubisoft. In May 2015, Kotaku leaked that Victory had been renamed Syndicate. On May 12, 2015, the game was officially announced by Ubisoft. The game retains most gameplay elements from Unity, while introducing new travelling systems, such as carriages and a grappling hook, and refined combat mechanics. It is the first game in the series to feature multiple playable protagonists, whom the player can switch between both during and outside missions.

==== Assassin's Creed Origins ====
Assassin's Creed Origins logo

Assassin's Creed Origins is a soft reboot of the franchise, and was released in October 2017 for the PlayStation 4, Xbox One and Windows, and in December 2020 for the Stadia. The game introduces a new protagonist in the modern-day, Layla Hassan, and explores the origins of the Assassin Brotherhood and their conflict with the Templar Order. The story is set in Ancient Egypt, near the end of the Ptolemaic period, and follows a Medjay named Bayek and his wife Aya, whose fight to protect their people from the Order of the Ancients—forerunners to the Templar Order—leads them to create the Hidden Ones—forerunners to the Assassin Brotherhood. Unlike previous installments in the series, which were structured like action-adventure games, Origins is an action role-playing game and introduces many new features to the series, including an overhauled hitbox-based combat system.

In February 2016, Ubisoft announced they would not be releasing a new game in 2016 in order to step "back and [re-examine] the Assassin's Creed franchise ... [and take the] year to evolve the game mechanics and to make sure we're delivering on the promise of Assassin's Creed offering unique and memorable gameplay experiences." On the decision, Guillemot said that "Ubisoft started to question the annualized franchise with the release of Assassin's Creed Unity, and the fact that Assassin's Creed Syndicate had "a slower launch than expected". Guillemot added that "by moving away from the annual iterations of the franchise, it will give the Assassin's Creed teams more time to take advantage of new engines and technology." Assassin's Creed IV: Black Flag's director Ashraf Ismail, commented on an interview that he and the team would be interested in doing an Assassin's Creed game in an Ancient Egyptian setting, along with reiterating an earlier statement that a female leading character was not an impossibility for the series. In May 2017, Ubisoft confirmed the development of Assassin's Creed Origins; one month later, the setting was confirmed to be Ptolemaic Egypt.

==== Assassin's Creed Odyssey ====
Assassin's Creed Odyssey logo

Assassin's Creed Odyssey was released in October 2018 for the PlayStation 4, Xbox One, Windows, and Nintendo Switch, and in November 2019 for the Stadia. The modern-day narrative continues from the events of Origins, as Layla, after being recruited to the Assassins, searches for Atlantis, which is rumored to house a powerful artifact: the Staff of Hermes Trismegistus. The main story is set during the Peloponnesian War between Athens and Sparta, at the height of Classical Greece. Players choose between two playable protagonists, Alexios and Kassandra, and embark on a quest to discover mysteries surrounding their family, as well as undermine a proto-Templar organization, the Cult of Kosmos, which is responsible for orchestrating the war.

Odyssey was leaked in May 2018 by a picture posted by the French website Jeuxvideo; it was officially announced at E3 2018, with a release date of October 2018. Similarly to Origins, the game places more emphasis on role-playing elements than previous entries in the series and introduces dialogue options and branching quests, which can result in different endings. Odyssey is also the first installment since Assassin's Creed: Rogue to feature a major emphasis on naval combat and exploration, with the protagonist commanding a trireme called the Adrestia.

==== Assassin's Creed Valhalla ====
Assassin's Creed Valhalla logo

Assassin's Creed Valhalla was released in November 2020 for the PlayStation 4, PlayStation 5, Xbox One, Xbox Series X/S, Windows and Stadia. The game concludes the modern-day story arc focusing on Layla, who must find a First Civilization temple in Norway to restore the Earth's magnetic field to its proper strength since Desmond's sacrifice in Assassin's Creed III only delayed the apocalypse. The main narrative takes place in the late 9th century, during the Viking expansions into the British Isles. Players control a customizable Viking raider, Eivor Varinsdottir, who becomes embroiled in the conflict between the Hidden Ones and the Order of the Ancients while attempting to establish a new Viking clan in England.

Valhalla was officially announced in April 2020. Ubisoft Montreal led its development along with fourteen other Ubisoft studios. The title had been leaked earlier in April 2019 under the name Assassin's Creed Kingdom. Like its predecessors, Valhalla is an action role-playing game focused on combat and exploration, although it brings back several elements that were absent in Origins and Odyssey, such as social stealth and a customizable settlement.

==== Assassin's Creed Mirage ====
Assassin's Creed Mirage logo

Assassin's Creed Mirage was released in October 2023 for Windows, PlayStation 4, PlayStation 5, Xbox One, and Xbox Series X/S. Set in Baghdad during the Islamic Golden Age—primarily during the Anarchy at Samarra—it follows Basim Ibn Ishaq, a character introduced in Assassin's Creed Valhalla, and his transition from street thief to Hidden One, a decade before the events of Valhalla. The design philosophy behind the game intended it to be a return to the series' roots by focusing on stealth, parkour, and assassinations over the role-playing elements featured heavily in recent installments.

In early 2022, it was reported that a new Assassin's Creed game, titled or code-named Rift, was in development and expected to release in late 2022 or early 2023. According to various leaks and reports, the game started out as an expansion for Valhalla and was intended to be more akin to older games in the series, featuring a smaller setting and a bigger focus on stealth gameplay. The game was officially confirmed by Ubisoft as Assassin's Creed Mirage on September 1, 2022, followed by a full announcement during the Ubisoft Forward online event on September 10. At the PlayStation Showcase event in May 2023, a new trailer for the game was shown, which revealed the release date to be October 12; however, it was later changed to October 5.

==== Assassin's Creed Shadows ====
Assassin's Creed Shadows logo

Assassin's Creed Shadows was released in March 2025 for the PlayStation 5, Windows, Xbox Series X/S, and macOS. Set in Japan towards the end of the Sengoku period, the game follows two distinct protagonists: Fujibayashi Naoe, a kunoichi, and Yasuke, an African samurai based on the historical figure of the same name. Developed by Ubisoft Quebec, the game is an action role-playing title similar to Odyssey, with an emphasis on each of its two playable characters' set of unique skills. It is also the first installment in the series to include the Animus Hub, formerly known as Assassin's Creed Infinity.

Shadows was first announced at Ubisoft Forward in September 2022 under the working title Assassin's Creed: Codename Red, as the next major Assassin's Creed game, to take place during the Feudal Japan period. Few details were revealed initially, although Marc-Alexis Côté, the Vice President Executive Producer for the Assassin's Creed franchise, said that the game would let players live out a "very powerful shinobi fantasy". On May 15, 2024, the first trailer for the game was released, which revealed its official title and a release date of November 15, 2024. In September, Ubisoft announced that Shadows had been delayed to February 14, 2025, and in January, the game was again delayed to March 20, 2025.

==== Assassin's Creed Black Flag Resynced ====
Assassin's Creed Black Flag Resynced was released on July 9, 2026, for Windows, PlayStation 5, and Xbox Series X/S. A remake of Assassin's Creed IV: Black Flag (2013), it follows an unidentified near-future protagonist as they explore the genetic memories of the pirate-turned-Assassin Edward Kenway during his time in the Caribbean, combining on-foot exploration with ship-based traversal and naval combat.

Primarily developed by Ubisoft Singapore, the remake uses the latest iteration of the Anvil engine and retains the original game's overall world structure while adding updated visuals, new gameplay systems, and an expanded storyline. Its revisions include changes to combat, stealth, parkour, and naval gameplay, including manual crouching, revised tailing and eavesdropping missions, recruitable officers for the Jackdaw, and dynamic weather effects that influence ship handling.

Ubisoft publicly acknowledged the project in March 2026 after earlier reports that a remake of Black Flag was in development.

=== Spin-offs ===
==== Assassin's Creed III: Liberation ====
Assassin's Creed: Liberation logo

Assassin's Creed III: Liberation is a spin-off to Assassin's Creed III, originally released for the PlayStation Vita in October 2012. The story takes place alongside the events of Assassin's Creed III and follows Aveline de Grandpré, a Louisiana Creole woman from New Orleans, the daughter of a French merchant father and an African mother. Aveline is recruited into the Assassin Brotherhood by a former slave and fights against slavery as well as the Templars, who plot to take over Louisiana after the end of the Seven Years' War. Aveline uses a variety of new weapons in combat, including a machete and a blowpipe for ranged attacks, and can disguise herself to deceive enemies, although certain disguises limit her movement and abilities. The entire game is presented as a product developed by the in-universe company Abstergo Entertainment, who have done a heavy amount of censoring in regard to the Assassin–Templar conflict. At various points during their playthrough, the player is contacted by the hacking collective Erudito, who helps them uncensor the game to learn the true nature of the events depicted.

An original Assassin's Creed title for the PlayStation Vita was announced to be in development during Gamescom 2011, and it was said that it would feature a new story with new characters. On June 4, 2012, at E3, Liberation was officially announced. On September 10, 2013, it was announced that the game would be re-released as Assassin's Creed: Liberation HD for PlayStation 3, Xbox 360, and Microsoft Windows via the PlayStation Network, Xbox Live Arcade, and Steam, respectively. In March 2019, it was announced that a remastered version of Liberation would be bundled with Assassin's Creed III Remastered for Windows, PlayStation 4, Xbox One and, later, for the Nintendo Switch. Ubisoft officially decommissioned Assassin's Creed: Liberation HD on October 1, 2022, with no additional copies being sold outside of the bundled Assassin's Creed III Remastered version.

==== Assassin's Creed: Freedom Cry ====
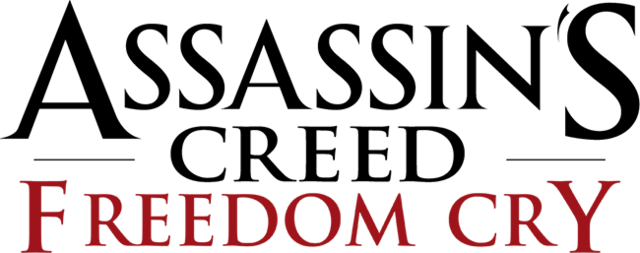
Assassin's Creed: Freedom Cry logo

Assassin's Creed Freedom Cry was originally released as downloadable content (DLC) for most versions of Assassin's Creed IV: Black Flag in December 2013. A standalone version was released in February 2014 for Microsoft Windows, PlayStation 3, and PlayStation 4. Set thirteen years after the ending of Black Flag, the game follows Adéwalé, a major supporting character from Black Flag, who served as the quartermaster to protagonist Edward Kenway before joining the Assassin Brotherhood towards the end of the main story. During the events of Freedom Cry, Adéwalé finds himself shipwrecked in the French colony of Saint-Domingue (present-day Haiti), where he encounters some of the most brutal slavery practices in the West Indies. Being a former slave, Adéwalé temporarily abandons his fight against the Templars and joins a Maroon rebellion to help them rescue oppressed slaves.

Being originally released as DLC for Black Flag, Freedom Cry's gameplay is virtually identical, though it does feature several new additions. Most notably, Adéwalé has the option to rescue slaves by raiding plantations, attacking slave ships, or simply killing their masters, with each freed slave serving as a resource for the player to accumulate to unlock upgrades for Adéwalé. Furthermore, some freed slaves join the Maroon rebellion and can become crew members aboard Adéwalé's ship, the Experto Crede, or help the player fight enemies.

==== Assassin's Creed Chronicles ====
Assassin's Creed Chronicles logo

Assassin's Creed Chronicles is sub-series of three 2.5D action and stealth games released for Microsoft Windows, PlayStation 4, PlayStation Vita, and Xbox One.

- The first game, Assassin's Creed Chronicles: China, was originally released as part of Assassin's Creed Unity's season pass on April 21, 2015, but it was later made available for purchase separately. Set after the short film Assassin's Creed: Embers, the game follows Shao Jun in Imperial China from 1526 to 1532, as she battles the Templar group, the Eight Tigers, and attempts to rebuild the Chinese Assassin Brotherhood.
- The second game, Assassin's Creed Chronicles: India, was released on January 12, 2016. It is set in British India in 1841, two years after the events of the graphic novel Assassin's Creed: Brahman. The game follows Arbaaz Mir, who, while attempting to recover a Precursor artifact from the Templars, becomes caught in a war between the Sikh Empire and the East India Company and must protect his friends and lover.
- The last game, Assassin's Creed Chronicles: Russia, was released on February 9, 2016. It is set in Soviet Russia in 1918, in the aftermath of the October Revolution, and bridges the gap between the comic book Assassin's Creed: The Fall and its graphic novel sequel, Assassin's Creed: The Chain. The game follows Nikolai Orelov as he attempts to protect a Precursor artifact and Grand Duchess Anastasia from the Templars and the Bolsheviks after witnessing the execution of the Romanov family.

==== Assassin's Creed Nexus VR ====
Assassin's Creed Nexus VR logo

Assassin's Creed Nexus VR is a virtual reality game developed by Ubisoft's subsidiary studio, Red Storm Entertainment, and released for the Meta Quest 2 on November 16, 2023. In the game, players take on the role of an Assassin hacker who infiltrates Abstergo and relives the memories of three of the series' protagonists—Ezio Auditore, Kassandra, and Ratonhnhaké:ton / Connor—to sabotage the Templars' latest project, called "Nexus Eye".

In September 2020, at the digital event of Facebook Connect, Red Storm Entertainment's VP of Product Development, Elizabeth Loverso, revealed several AAA game franchises coming to virtual reality format to the public. Two of the projects announced were an untitled Assassin's Creed game and an untitled installment from the Tom Clancy's Splinter Cell series (also developed by Ubisoft), with both titles set to release exclusively for Oculus platforms. This would not be the first Assassin's Creed title to come to VR, but would be the first to be publicly available; the Splinter Cell VR game was cancelled on July 21, 2022. In June 2023, at a Meta Quest Gaming Showcase event, the updated title for the game, Assassin's Creed Nexus VR, was announced along with a release window of late 2023.

=== Handheld and mobile games ===
==== Assassin's Creed: Altaïr's Chronicles ====
Assassin's Creed: Altaïr's Chronicles is a spin-off for the Nintendo DS, Windows Phone, Android, iOS, webOS, Symbian, and Java ME, originally released in February 2008. The game is a prequel to the first Assassin's Creed, taking place in the year 1190, and follows Altaïr Ibn-LaʼAhad as he attempts to retrieve an artifact called the Chalice from the Templars.

==== Assassin's Creed: Bloodlines ====
Assassin's Creed: Bloodlines is the second spin-off title following Altaïr. It was released as a PlayStation Portable exclusive in November 2009 (concurrently with Assassin's Creed II) and acts as a direct sequel to the original game. Following the events of Assassin's Creed, Altaïr travels to the island nation of Cyprus to eliminate the last remnants of the Templar Order. Here, he again runs into Maria Thorpe, a Templar agent whose life he spared in the first game, and they team up to eliminate the Templar presence on the island and learn more about the Apple of Eden and the mysterious Templar Archive, where more Pieces of Eden are believed to be hidden. Despite the technical limitations of the PlayStation Portable, the game features most gameplay mechanics of the console and PC titles, and even a few exclusive elements.

==== Assassin's Creed II: Discovery ====
Assassin's Creed II: Discovery is a spin-off to Assassin's Creed II and was released alongside it in November 2009 for the Nintendo DS; it was later re-released for iOS in January 2010. The game is a 2.5D side-scroller, and takes place during the events of Assassin's Creed II, between Sequences 12 and 13, when Ezio is searching for the Apple of Eden after losing it to Girolamo Savonarola. During his search, Ezio travels to Spain to rescue members of the Spanish Assassin Brotherhood who have been arrested on the orders of Tomás de Torquemada, the Grand Inquisitor of the Spanish Inquisition, and allies with several historical figures, such as Luis de Santángel and Christopher Columbus.

==== Assassin's Creed Unity: Arno's Chronicles ====
Assassin's Creed Unity: Arno's Chronicles is a side-scrolling mobile game released for the Huawei Honor smartphone series in June 2017. It features a similar gameplay style to the Assassin's Creed Chronicles games, and roughly adapts the events of Assassin's Creed Unity's main storyline.

==== Assassin's Creed Rebellion ====
Assassin's Creed Rebellion is a free-to-play, strategy role-playing game for iOS and Android devices that was released worldwide on November 21, 2018. Set during the Spanish Inquisition in the late 15th century, it follows the Spanish Assassins under Aguilar de Nerha as they attempt to build their own Brotherhood to overthrow the Spanish Templars. The game features a large cast of characters from the entire Assassin's Creed franchise, as well as thirty new characters created exclusively for Rebellion.

=== Cancelled and defunct games ===
==== Assassin's Creed: Project Legacy ====
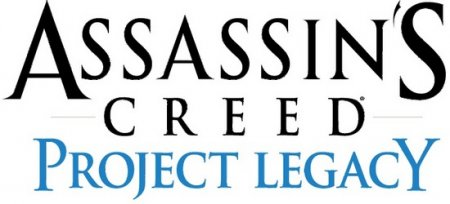
Assassin's Creed: Project Legacy logo

Assassin's Creed: Project Legacy was a single-player browser-based, role-playing video game and Facebook application designed as a promotion and tie-in for Assassin's Creed: Brotherhood. The game is mostly text-based but includes graphics and sound as well as some video. The game was put on indefinite hold in 2011 and was later removed by Facebook on 15 May 2013.

==== Assassin's Creed: Multiplayer Rearmed ====
Assassin's Creed: Multiplayer Rearmed was a multiplayer video game designed for iOS, and released for the iPad, iPhone, and iPod Touch in October 2011. It was the only Assassin's Creed multiplayer game driven by an in-game economy. The aim of the game is to assassinate the assigned targets while avoiding being killed by a hunter. Players could purchase additional items, characters and abilities as well as compete with friends and foes from around the globe in a four player real-time online multiplayer mode. Players could connect via Game Center. It was also possible to play against someone in the immediate area via Bluetooth. Available map locations include Jerusalem, San Donato, Venice and Alhambra.

==== Assassin's Creed: Recollection ====
Assassin's Creed: Recollection was a real-time board game designed for iOS. It was initially released for the iPad in December 2011, and later for the iPhone and iPod Touch in March 2012. In the game, players go head-to-head in real-time political battles with different characters from the main games of the series across over 280 memories. The single-player campaign was estimated to provide over ten hours of gameplay, with 20 missions from Barcelona to Constantinople and 10 bonus challenge missions. The game also featured a Versus Mode, in which players could challenge their friends and other people worldwide, as well as a collection of various artwork from the franchise.

==== Assassin's Creed: Utopia ====
Assassin's Creed: Utopia is a cancelled mobile game that was planned to be available on Android and iOS devices. The game's story would have led into Assassin's Creed III, though there would have been no links in terms of gameplay. Utopia would have taken place in the 17th century, at the beginning of the colonization of North America. Gameplay would have spanned 150 years of history to help players, in the words of Tom Phillips from Eurogamer, "discover how the Assassins influenced history and helped shape the nation's original thirteen colonies". The gameplay involved building a colonial city, and was planned to have more of a social slant than any of the earlier games. The Assassins of each colony would have taken on their enemies in limited-time epic battles, and players would have been able to pit their strength against friends in asynchronous 3D brawls.

==== Assassin's Creed: Initiates ====
Assassin's Creed: Initiates was a community-oriented project launched on 1 September 2012 which concerned the universe of the franchise, its database, plot elements and dossiers of the characters. It was shut down on 24 December 2014. Offline maintenance continued until February 2015, and the platform was retired on 4 December 2015.

==== Assassin's Creed: Pirates ====
Assassin's Creed: Pirates was a mobile game released for iOS and Android devices on December 5, 2013. Developed by Ubisoft Paris, the game follows Captain Alonzo Batilla, who is neither Assassin nor Templar, as he commands a ship and crew, while crossing paths with the Assassins and Templars. Gameplay focuses on real-time battles between ships. The title is rendered in 3D and features both wind and weather that affect how players proceed. The game is no longer available to play, having been delisted from all digital storefronts in 2017.

==== Assassin's Creed: Memories ====
Assassin's Creed: Memories was a mobile game released for iOS devices on August 21, 2014. Developed by Ubisoft in collaboration with PlayNext and GREE, the game combined card collecting, battling, target chasing, and strategy elements, along with the option of competitive multiplayer. Additional multiplayer options included allowing players to join a guild and engage in 20 vs. 20 guild combat scenarios. Memories featured a number of different historical eras, including the Third Crusade, the Golden Age of Piracy, feudal Japan, and the Mongolian Empire. Online services for the game were disabled in February 2015, and it was delisted from all digital storefronts the following month.

==== Assassin's Creed Identity ====
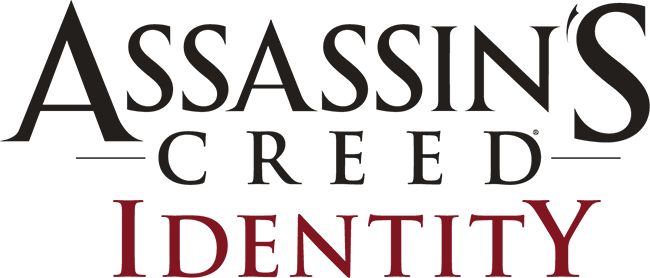
Assassin's Creed Identity logo

Assassin's Creed Identity was a third-person role-playing video game for iOS and Android devices that was released worldwide on February 25, 2016, following a soft-launch in Australia and New Zealand in 2014. It was the first mobile game in the series to feature a fully explorable 3D environment, and took place alongside the events of Assassin's Creed: Brotherhood. In Identity, players created their own custom Assassin and completed missions for the Brotherhood in Italy, while interacting with various characters from the mainline games, like Ezio Auditore and Niccolò Machiavelli. The game's servers were shut down in October 2021, and it is no longer playable.

==== Project Scarlet ====
An untitled Assassin's Creed game, known simply by the working title Project Scarlet, had started development around 2024. It was set during the American Civil War and featured a Black slave that had escaped, was recruited by the Assassins, and proceeded to combat racist groups like the Ku Klux Klan. Ubisoft cancelled the title after the backlash over Yasuke's portrayal in Assassin's Creed Shadows and the unease in the political climate in the U.S. during 2024.

=== Re-release compilations and collections ===
- Assassin's Creed: Ezio Trilogy: Compilation of Assassin's Creed II, Assassin's Creed: Brotherhood, and Assassin's Creed: Revelations. It was released for the PlayStation 3 and Xbox 360 on November 13, 2012.
- Assassin's Creed: Heritage Collection: Compilation of the first five games of the main series, featuring Assassin's Creed, Assassin's Creed II, Assassin's Creed: Brotherhood, Assassin's Creed: Revelations, and Assassin's Creed III. It was released for Microsoft Windows, PlayStation 3, and Xbox 360 on November 8, 2013.
- Assassin's Creed: The Americas Collection (American title) / Assassin's Creed: Birth of a New World – The American Saga (European title): Developed by Ubisoft Montreal, features Assassin's Creed III, Assassin's Creed: Liberation HD and Assassin's Creed IV: Black Flag. It was released for Windows, PlayStation 3, and Xbox 360 on October 3, 2014, in Europe and October 28, 2014, in North America. The Windows version is exclusive to Europe.
- Assassin's Creed: The Ezio Collection: Developed by Virtuos and Ubisoft Montreal, features remastered versions of Assassin's Creed II, Assassin's Creed: Brotherhood, and Assassin's Creed: Revelations for the PlayStation 4 and Xbox One. The games feature improved graphics, lighting, effects, and textures, and also include all previously released downloadable content for the single-player. In addition, the bundle features the short films Assassin's Creed: Embers and Assassin's Creed: Lineage. The collection was released on November 15, 2016, to mixed reviews, being generally criticized for its minimal graphical enhancements, the dated gameplay, and the capped 30 frames per second. A Nintendo Switch version was released in February 2022.
- Assassin's Creed: The Rebel Collection: Contains Assassin's Creed IV: Black Flag and the remastered version of Assassin's Creed Rogue, along with all previously released downloadable content for both games. It was released on December 6, 2019, for the Nintendo Switch.

=== Future games ===
Asked about the future of the series in 2009, Sébastien Puel from Ubisoft said that "we could do 35 of these [Assassin's Creed games]", while Laurent Detoc later said "we hope to reach Assassin's Creed 10."

In November 2011, a Ubisoft survey was sent out, asking participants which locations and time periods they would like to see in the "next Assassin's Creed games". These settings were Medieval China, Victorian England, Ancient Egypt, the Portuguese and Spanish colonizations of the Americas, the American Revolution, the Russian Revolution, Feudal Japan, and Ancient Rome. Alex Hutchinson, creative director of Assassin's Creed III, suggested the most requested Assassin's Creed settings, World War II, Feudal Japan and Ancient Egypt, are "the three worst settings for an Assassin's Creed game". Hutchinson also stated both he and Corey May were open to the idea of a future entry set during the time of the British Raj, which now consists of the modern states of Bangladesh, Pakistan, Myanmar, and India. Victorian England, the American Revolution, Medieval China, parts of the British Raj, the Russian Revolution, Ancient Egypt, and Feudal Japan were eventually used for Assassin's Creed Syndicate, Assassin's Creed III, Assassin's Creed Chronicles, Assassin's Creed Origins, and Assassin's Creed Shadows, respectively. World War I appeared briefly as a section of Syndicate, while World War II was used for a single mission in Assassin's Creed Unity.

On June 28, 2024, Ubisoft CEO Yves Guillemot confirmed the future development of remakes of some of the older Assassin's Creed titles, which would reportedly "allow [Ubisoft] to revisit some of the games we've created in the past and modernize them". Guillemot stated that this decision stemmed from the fact that "There are worlds in some of our older Assassin's Creed games that are still extremely rich".

==== Assassin's Creed Jade ====
Assassin's Creed Jade is an upcoming title for Android and iOS devices. Set in Ancient China during the Qin dynasty in the 3rd century BC, the game will allow players to create their own custom character and will feature the same style of gameplay as the main console and PC releases.

The game was first leaked as Project Jade on September 6, 2022, and reported by Try Hard Guides. A teaser trailer was showcased at Ubisoft Forward on September 10, which revealed the game's working title of Assassin's Creed: Codename Jade. In July 2023, a closed beta test for the game was announced, which required players to sign up between August 3 and 11 to participate. At Gamescom 2023, a gameplay trailer was shown and the game's official title was revealed to be Assassin's Creed Jade.

==== Assassin's Creed: Codename Hexe ====
Assassin's Creed: Codename Hexe was announced at Ubisoft Forward in September 2022 as the next flagship title in the series, following Assassin's Creed Shadows. Development is being led by Clint Hocking at Ubisoft Montreal. Marc-Alexis Côté described the title as "a very different type of Assassin's Creed game". While little on its setting was shown in its initial trailer, Bloomberg News reported that the game is set in Central Europe during the 16th century, at the height of the Holy Roman Empire, and will focus on witch hunts and other paranormal fears.

==== Assassin's Creed: Codename Invictus ====
Assassin's Creed: Codename Invictus is a standalone PvP multiplayer experience in the Assassin's Creed franchise. The project was first announced at Ubisoft Forward in September 2022 as part of Ubisoft's wider plans for the future of the series. Development is being handled by a dedicated team at Ubisoft Montreal, led by veterans of For Honor and Rainbow Six Siege who are applying their experience with competitive multiplayer design to the project. In 2026, Ubisoft responded to leaked material allegedly showing footage from a private playtest, stating that the circulated image had been "heavily altered" and that more information would be shared at a later date.

==== Other reported projects ====
Several unannounced and unconfirmed Assassin's Creed projects have been reported through leaks and industry sources. Codename Nebula was reportedly pitched by Ubisoft Sofia as a single-player Assassin's Creed title featuring multiple settings, including the Aztec Empire, India, and the Mediterranean. Codename Raid was reportedly pitched by Ubisoft Chengdu as a free-to-play four-player cooperative PvE multiplayer experience featuring characters from the Assassin's Creed universe. Codename Echoes was reportedly pitched by Ubisoft Annecy as a multiplayer project using Ubisoft Scalar technology. Codename Stardust was also rumored to be a remake of the original Assassin's Creed. In November 2026, two additional projects were reported to be in development: Codename Mars, a game set in Ancient Rome, potentially connected to the Assassin's Creed television series, and Codename Pocket, a mobile spin-off set in Jerusalem.

AC League was a reported cooperative multiplayer project developed by Ubisoft Annecy. Originally planned as a Assassin's Creed Shadows expansion, it was later redesigned as a standalone four-player multiplayer experience before being canceled during Ubisoft's restructuring efforts.

== Animus Hub ==
The Animus Hub is a feature which made its debut in Assassin's Creed Shadows, intended to connect multiple installments of the Assassin's Creed franchise. Initially announced as a standalone launcher under the name Assassin's Creed Infinity, Ubisoft revealed more details about the Animus Hub in January 2025, ahead of Shadows' release, including the fact that it would be a component present in all upcoming Assassin's Creed titles, meant to help immerse players in the games' fictional universe. From the Animus Hub, players can launch all Assassin's Creed games installed on their system, complete "Projects" to earn in-game rewards, and access an extensive database called "the Vault", which also contains elements related to the overarching modern-day narrative. At launch, the only games to be included in the Animus Hub were Origins, Odyssey, Valhalla, Mirage, and Shadows, with more titles set to be added over time.

The Animus Hub was first announced as a new live-service title codenamed Assassin's Creed Infinity in April 2021. Following another round of sexual misconduct allegations and internal investigations across Ubisoft in 2020 and 2021, which saw the departure of many top-level executives as well as attrition from its studios, Ubisoft opted to merge operations of the Montreal and Quebec studios under one administrative body, with Quebec taking the lead on the Assassin's Creed series. This led to a collaboration to develop the "most ambitious game" in the series to date: Assassin's Creed Infinity. Infinity was initially envisioned to be similar to Fortnite and Grand Theft Auto Online, in that it would be more of a service, rather than a game, intended to be an entry point for future Assassin's Creed titles for players as well as to simplify the development of these games across Ubisoft's studios.

Marc-Alexis Côté, from Ubisoft Quebec, was announced to serve as Infinity's executive producer. According to Côté, Infinity would be used to present the modern-day setting of the Assassin's Creed games involving the Animus, while each game would be focused on the historical setting. Clint Hocking and Jonathan Dumont serve as the creative directors, leading the Montreal and Quebec divisions, respectively. Étienne Allonier and Julien Laferrière, both from Montreal, serve as brand director and senior producer, respectively. In September 2022, more details about Assassin's Creed Infinity were revealed, including the fact that the first two games to be included in Infinity would be the then-upcoming Assassin's Creed: Codename Red (later renamed to Assassin's Creed Shadows) and Assassin's Creed: Codename Hexe. In January 2025, Ubisoft officially announced Infinity's rebranding to the Animus Hub and that it would no longer be a standalone title, but rather a feature present in all upcoming Assassin's Creed games.

== Other media ==
=== Television ===
In November 2016, it was announced that Ubisoft and Netflix started talks regarding how to develop an Assassin's Creed series. In July 2017, Adi Shankar revealed he would be creating the series, which would be in the anime format. The series, which will feature an original story from Shankar, will share the same universe as the other media of the franchise. In October 2020, Netflix and Ubisoft announced that they entered an agreement to develop live-action series, animated series and anime series.

The first live-action series would be produced by Ubisoft Film & Television for the streaming service, with Jason Altman and Danielle Kreinik as executive producers and Jeb Stuart as the writer. In January 2023, Collider reported that Stuart was no longer involved with the series. By July 2025, Netflix and Ubisoft announced that Roberto Patino and David Wiener will produce the series. In November and December 2025, Toby Wallace, Lola Petticrew, Zachary Hart, and Laura Marcus were cast as series regulars. Johan Renck had been hired to direct episodes of the series. In January 2026, Tanzyn Crawford joined the cast as a series regular. The series is expected to start production in 2026 in Italy, which Deadline reported will serve as a setting for the series.

Elements from Assassin's Creed appear as part of the 2023 animated series Captain Laserhawk: A Blood Dragon Remix produced by Ubisoft Film & Television for Netflix. One of the primary protagonists, the anthropomorphic frog Bullfrog, is depicted as a member of the Order of Assassins, while the antagonistic megacorporation Eden is said to be descended from the Templar Order.

=== Film ===
==== Theatrical ====
A live-action film, titled Assassin's Creed, set in the same universe as the video games and other media, was released on December 21, 2016. Development for the film began in October 2011, when Sony Pictures entered final negotiations with Ubisoft Motion Pictures to make the film. In July 2012, Michael Fassbender was announced to star in the film, as well as co-produce the film. His role was revealed in August 2015 as Callum Lynch, whose ancestor, Aguilar, is an Assassin from 15th-century Spain. In October 2012, Ubisoft revealed the film would no longer be produced by Sony Pictures, instead co-produced with New Regency and distributed by 20th Century Fox. In January 2013, Michael Lesslie was hired to write the film, with Scott Frank, Adam Cooper and Bill Collage performing rewrites to the script. By the end of April 2014, Justin Kurzel was in talks to direct. Principal photography began on August 31, 2015, and ended on January 15, 2016. The film was poorly received by critics and performed poorly at the box office, losing an estimated $75 to $100 million and becoming one of the biggest box office bombs of 2016.

==== Live-action short film ====
Assassin's Creed: Lineage is a 36-minute film made to promote Assassin's Creed II. The film, released in three parts on YouTube across 2009, was the first step by Ubisoft into the film industry. Lineage serves as a prequel to Assassin's Creed II, exploring the life of Ezio's father Giovanni Auditore and his career as an Assassin in 15th-century Italy. Following the mysterious assassination of the Duke of Milan, Galeazzo Maria Sforza, in 1476, Giovanni sets out to find those responsible, leading him to uncover a larger conspiracy masterminded by the Templars and their Grand Master, Rodrigo Borgia.

==== Animated short films ====
Originally named Secret Project Number Three, Assassin's Creed: Ascendance is an animated short by UbiWorkshop and Ubisoft Montreal, which bridges the gap between Assassin's Creed II and Assassin's Creed: Brotherhood. It revolves around Cesare Borgia's backstory and rise to power in Italy.

Assassin's Creed: Embers is a 21-minute animated film included in the Signature and Collector's Editions of Assassin's Creed Revelations; it was later re-released on the PlayStation Store in April 2015. The film serves as an epilogue to Ezio's story, depicting the final days of his life after he retired from the Assassin Brotherhood and started a family. When a mysterious Chinese Assassin named Shao Jun arrives to seek his help and guidance, Ezio must fight to protect his loved ones one last time.

=== Print publications ===
The Assassin's Creed series has a collection of print publications by various authors, including Christie Golden, Oliver Bowden, Gordon Doherty and Matthew J. Kirby. Set within the fictional universe of the video game franchise, it includes collections such as novels, comic books, and encyclopedias. British publishing house Penguin Books was responsible for most of the publications until 2020.

=== Audio drama ===
Assassin's Creed Gold is an Audible audio drama by Anthony del Col, released on February 27, 2020. The four-hour drama follows a card shark and hustler called Ailyah Khan (Tamara Lawrence), who is enlisted by Gavin Banks (John Chancer) to relive the memories of her ancestor Omar Khaled (Riz Ahmed), an Assassin in 17th-century England. The production also features the voices of Anthony Head, as Isaac Newton, and Danny Wallace, who reprises his series role as Shaun Hastings.

=== Board games ===
A board game, Assassin's Creed: Arena, was launched on February 26, 2014. Inspired by Assassin's Creed: Revelations, it features many characters from the game, including Shahkulu, Anacletos, Odai Dunqas and Oksana Razin, as well as original characters.

On September 17, 2018, Triton Noir announced a new board game called Assassin's Creed: Brotherhood of Venice. Set in 1509, between the events of Assassin's Creed: Brotherhood and Revelations, it includes characters from the video games like Ezio Auditore da Firenze, Leonardo da Vinci, and Lucrezia Borgia, as well as new characters like Alessandra d'Avanzago. It was developed by Thibaud de la Touanne, and is estimated to provide more than 20 hours of play. The game was set to release in November 2018, but was delayed and eventually released in August 2021. In March 2023, an expansion, titled Assassin's Creed: Brotherhood of Venice – Apocalypse and set in the jungles of the Khmer Empire (modern-day Cambodia) during the 16th century, was announced.

=== Concert ===
Assassin's Creed Symphony is a tour across North America and Europe featuring composers who worked on the soundtracks of each game in the series, including Jesper Kyd, Lorne Balfe, Brian Tyler, Austin Wintory, Sarah Schachner, Winifred Phillips, Elitsa Alexandrova, Chris Tilton, Ryan Amon, and The Flight. It was scheduled to begin in the summer of 2019, and expected to feature holographic characters from the series. The 2019–2020 tour was canceled due to the COVID-19 pandemic.

The concert Assassin's Creed Symphonic Adventure, developed by Overlook Events, was presented in a world premiere in Paris on October 29, 2022, at the Le Grand Rex. The world premiere celebrated the 15th anniversary of the video game series. An international world tour began in 2023. The concert is a two-hour performance with a full symphonic orchestra, also featuring a choir and soloists.

=== Apps ===
In June 2026 Ubisoft released Echoes of Revolution, a free mobile AR tour in Boston and New York City for America's 250th anniversary, experiencing the history of America and Revolutionary era.

== Reception ==
Aggregate review scores
Game	Metacritic
Assassin's Creed	(PC) 79 (PS3) 81 (X360) 81
Assassin's Creed: Altaïr's Chronicles	(NDS) 58
Assassin's Creed: Bloodlines	(PSP) 63
Assassin's Creed II	(PC) 86 (PS3) 91 (X360) 90
Assassin's Creed II: Discovery	(NDS) 69
Assassin's Creed: Brotherhood	(PC) 88 (PS3) 90 (X360) 89
Assassin's Creed Rearmed	(iOS) 60
Assassin's Creed: Revelations	(PC) 80 (PS3) 80 (X360) 80
Assassin's Creed Recollection	(iOS) 75
Assassin's Creed III	(PC) 80 (PS3) 85 (WIIU) 85 (X360) 84
Assassin's Creed III: Liberation	(PC) 66 (PS3) 64 (Vita) 70 (X360) 62
Assassin's Creed IV: Black Flag	(PC) 84 (PS3) 88 (PS4) 83 (WIIU) 86 (X360) 86
Assassin's Creed: Pirates	(iOS) 67
Assassin's Creed Memories	(iOS) 48
Assassin's Creed Rogue	(PC) 74 (PS3) 72 (X360) 72
Assassin's Creed Identity	(iOS) 69
Assassin's Creed Unity	(PC) 70 (PS4) 70 (XONE) 72
Assassin's Creed Syndicate	(PC) 74 (PS4) 76 (XONE) 78
Assassin's Creed Chronicles	(Vita) 70
Assassin's Creed Origins	(PC) 84 (PS4) 81 (XONE) 85
Assassin's Creed Odyssey	(PC) 86 (PS4) 83 (XONE) 87
Assassin's Creed Valhalla	(PC) 85 (PS4) 81 (XONE) 82 (XSX) 85
Assassin's Creed Mirage	(PC) 77/100 (PS5) 77/100 (XSX) 78/100
Assassin's Creed Shadows	(PC) 78/100 (PS5) 81/100 (XSX) 85/100

The Assassin's Creed series has received mainly positive reviews from critics, with Blast Magazine calling it "the standout series on [the seventh generation] of consoles". It has been praised for its ambitious game design, visuals, and narratives but criticized for its technical issues and annual releases of almost every installment; the series' shift, which started in Origins, towards prioritising role-playing mechanics over stealth in several games has been considered polarizing.

As of September 2019, the series had sold over 140 million copies with over 95 million players, becoming Ubisoft's best selling franchise and one of the highest selling video game franchises of all time. By September 2022, total sales of the series had reached 200 million. The franchise reportedly generated around €4 billion in the decade leading up to 2024.

== Cultural impact ==
Elements of Assassin's Creed have been introduced as content into other Ubisoft games and those from third parties. The macOS and Microsoft Windows versions of Team Fortress 2 (2007) feature two cosmetic items for the Spy class that were added to promote Assassin's Creed: Revelations; the first is the series' signature Hidden Blade, while the second is a hood based on the one Ezio wears in the game. Sackboy, the player character from LittleBigPlanet and LittleBigPlanet 2, can be equipped with a skin resembling Ezio's outfit. In Prince of Persia (2008), Altaïr's costume can be unlocked with a code obtained by pre-ordering the game. In 2010's Prince of Persia: The Forgotten Sands, there is an outfit resembling Ezio's robes in Assassin's Creed II, which is unlockable through Uplay. Final Fantasy XIII-2 (2011) includes a costume based on Ezio's outfit from Assassin's Creed: Revelations, added as an optional costume via downloadable content.

In Metal Gear Solid 4: Guns of the Patriots (2008), Altaïr's outfit is an unlockable cosmetic option for Solid Snake; it was originally announced as an April Fools joke by game director Hideo Kojima. Kojima later returned the favor by allowing Ubisoft to include a Raiden outfit in Assassin's Creed: Brotherhood. In Metal Gear Solid: Peace Walker (2010), the player can jump into a bale of hay from a rooftop, which includes the eagle sound effect used in the Assassin's Creed games, and use it to attract and subdue enemies. The Assassin Order is referenced by a character. In the 2009 Wii game Academy of Champions: Soccer, Altaïr appears as a playable character along with other Ubisoft characters. In the 2012 game Soulcalibur V, Ezio appears as a playable fighter and is featured on the box art. In July 2022, both Ezio and Eivor were added as playable fighters in Brawlhalla (2017).

Assassin's Creed IV: Black Flag (2013) introduces the character of Olivier Garneau, the CEO of video game company Abstergo Entertainment, who helps Ubisoft to develop the Assassin's Creed video games within the franchise's fictional universe. During the events of the game, Garneau goes to Chicago, the setting of Ubisoft's 2014 video game Watch Dogs. In the latter game, Garneau is the subject of a side mission that sees the playable protagonist Aiden Pearce saving him from being kidnapped; it is implied this was done by the Assassin Brotherhood. Additionally, two characters in the game are seen playing Assassin's Creed II. Ubisoft has described those appearances as small Easter eggs, and has neither confirmed nor denied a shared continuity between both franchises. Assassin's Creed Origins (2017) mentions the news about Garneau's incident in Chicago, along with a picture of Aiden Pearce killing Garneau.

In downloadable contents (DLC), Ubisoft collaborated with Square Enix to hold a limited-time Assassin's Creed-themed festival event crossover in Final Fantasy XV (2016) on consoles under the title Assassin's Festival, which lasted from August 31, 2017, to January 31, 2018. The DLC featured gameplay elements from the Assassin's Creed game series, new quests, mini-games, and exclusive Assassin's Creed-themed items. In January 2020, Nintendo released a Mii Fighter costume based on Altaïr as downloadable content in the crossover fighting game Super Smash Bros. Ultimate (2018).

In August 2021, Ubisoft released a free update for their 2020 game Watch Dogs: Legion that featured a non-canonical crossover with the Assassin's Creed series. The update introduced optional story content, which sees DedSec crossing paths with and helping Darcy Clarkson, a member of the modern-day Assassin Brotherhood and a descendant of Jacob and Evie Frye. Darcy is also included as a playable character and features a unique Assassin-themed playstyle.

The opening ceremony of the 2024 Summer Olympics featured a masked torchbearer wearing a hooded outfit and performing parkour across Paris' rooftops. This drew many comparisons to the main characters of the Assassin's Creed series, especially Arno Dorian, the protagonist of Assassin's Creed Unity (2014), which is also set in Paris. This similarity was acknowledged, and implied to be intentional, by Ubisoft in a response to a tweet by the official Olympics Twitter account posted during the opening ceremonies.

== See also ==
- Music of Assassin's Creed
- List of best-selling video game franchises
