= Assassin's Creed: Bloodlines =

2009 video game

- European cover art
- Developer: Griptonite Games
- Publisher: Ubisoft
- Producers: Dan McAuliffe; Shawn Mulanix; Merric Shank
- Designer: Shawn Truesdell
- Programmers: Eli Ford; Scott Perras
- Artists: Jack Scott Hill; Michael Wilcox
- Writer: Darby McDevitt
- Series: Assassin's Creed
- Platform: PlayStation Portable
- Release: NA: November 17, 2009; AU: November 19, 2009; EU: November 20, 2009
- Genres: Action-adventure, stealth
- Mode: Single-player

Assassin's Creed: Bloodlines is a 2009 action-adventure game developed by Griptonite Games and published by Ubisoft. It is the second spin-off installment in the Assassin's Creed franchise, and acts as a direct sequel to Assassin's Creed (2007). Spanning the years 1191–1193, Bloodlines follows Altaïr Ibn-LaʼAhad after the events of the original game, as he travels to Cyprus to eliminate the last remnants of the Knights Templar and learn more about their plans. The game also explores Altaïr's relationship with Maria Thorpe, a Templar agent whose life he spared in the first game and who would eventually become his wife.

The game was announced by Sony at the E3 Conference in June 2009 as a new title for their PlayStation Portable console. It was released in November 2009, concurrently with Assassin's Creed II and Assassin's Creed II: Discovery, and received mixed reviews from critics. The next spin-off in the series, Assassin's Creed III: Liberation, was released in October 2012.

== Gameplay ==
Assassin's Creed: Bloodlines is an action-adventure, stealth game set in an open world environment. The gameplay is nearly identical to that of Assassin's Creed in terms of control style, although there were minor modifications to the control scheme, due to the lack of specific keys and buttons on the PlayStation Portable. Some features from the original game, such as Eagle Vision, were also removed.

The game is primarily set on the island of Cyprus, where players can freely explore the cities of Limassol and Kyrenia. Due to the console limitations and the smaller map size, horseback riding was removed in Bloodlines, while the number of people present on the street was greatly reduced, explained in-game as civilians being more insecure and reluctant to leave their homes as a result of the new system of governance. Like in the previous game, Altaïr can synchronize from high vantage points around a city in order to map out the area. Although the map itself is already drawn out, synchronizing will provide the locations of side missions.

Taking the place of flags, a new collectible featured in the game are Templar Coins that can be used to upgrade the player's health bar, and the amount of damage a weapon can inflict. Three types of coins are present in-game: Bronze, Silver and Gold, with Gold holding the highest value. Similar to the original game, side missions are available to players, such as saving civilians from Templar soldiers and performing specific tasks for allies of the Cypriot resistance. The variety of tasks has been expanded, like delivering letters and intercepting couriers. In return, Altaïr will receive coins as a reward, instead of assistance from previous groups, such as scholars and vigilantes.

Stealth in Bloodlines was downgraded due to the control scheme. Blending was also downgraded due to system limitations. Although scholars are still present in-game, Altaïr can no longer use them as a way to hide. While Altaïr can still blend, it only acts as a way to bypass guards without raising suspicion. Scaling the side of buildings was made easier and faster, resulting in simpler animations, again due to the system's inferiority. High and Low profile movements are still present in-game, though they have been downgraded as well.

Bloodlines features several new assassination techniques and weapons. While most assassinations are similar to the first game, the animations have been toned down to better fit the system, and a new assassination type has been added: ledge assassinations, allowing Altaïr to silently kill an enemy and pull them off a ledge. Weapons from the previous game return, such as Altaïr's sword, his Hidden Blade, throwing knives, and his fists. Throwing knives can no longer be regained via pickpocketing, but by accessing a newly added knife box in any safehouse; alternatively, players may pick up used knives by simply walking over them.

Story missions and assassinations were simplified and made more straightforward. As a replacement for eavesdropping and pickpocketing, missions are structured similarly to Assassin's Creed II, with Altaïr handling one task after another and slowly gathering vital information as each mission is completed. Cutscenes are played through preset dialogue, with the character models acting in preset motions and gestures. Unique gestures are only present in confrontations with boss characters, such as Moloch and the Dark Oracle. Subtitles were also added to the game, a feature absent from the original.

Bloodlines features in-game achievements, which reward players with Templar Coins. Achievements can be earned by performing specific tasks, such as killing a set number of soldiers in a specified order, and also by collecting all of the Templar Coins located throughout the game world.

== Plot ==
A few weeks after the events of Assassin's Creed, Altaïr Ibn-La'Ahad, now the Mentor of the Assassin Brotherhood, learns that the remaining Knights Templar are regrouping in Acre and leads an attack on their stronghold. Although the Assassins are too late to stop the Templars from sailing to Cyprus, Altaïr encounters and defeats Maria Thorpe, who attempted to avenge her late master, Robert de Sablé. Chartering a ship, Altaïr decides to head to Cyprus in pursuit of the Templars, with Maria in tow. Once there, he learns of the presence of Armand Bouchart, who has succeeded Robert as Grand Master of the Templar Order.

Altaïr soon meets and gains the assistance of a resistance movement on Cyprus opposed to the presence of the Templars, who, after purchasing the island from King Richard, have formed a repressive government to control the land and its people. He also learns of a Templar "archive", a trove of Templar knowledge and artifacts, hidden somewhere on the island. True to the way of the Assassins, Altaïr manages to both locate the archive and free Cyprus from Bouchart's grip, after killing all of his underlings: Frederick "the Red", Moloch "the Bull", Shalim and Shahar "the Twins", and the Dark Oracle "the Witch". Eventually, Altaïr confronts Bouchart himself inside the archive, whose contents have been evacuated and relocated by the Templars, and kills him as the archive begins to collapse.

The game also details the relationship between Altaïr and Maria. At first, Maria is hostile and sarcastic towards Altaïr (in her own words, "the man who spared my neck but stole my life"), but as the story develops, she gradually warms up to the Assassin who, despite her numerous escape attempts, repeatedly rescues her from harm and does not punish her. Eventually, Maria loses her faith in the Templar cause after witnessing the atrocities committed by Bouchart and his men on Cyprus, and assists Altaïr by eliminating a Templar mole in the Cypriot resistance who planned to kill the Assassin. After also helping him defeat Bouchart and escape the collapsing Templar archive, Maria decides to stay by Altaïr's side as they prepare to leave Cyprus and travel the world together, by this point having fallen in love with each other.

== Connectivity ==
Assassin's Creed: Bloodlines features exclusive connectivity with the PlayStation 3 version of Assassin's Creed II. It was revealed at E3 2009 that by connecting a PlayStation Portable to the PlayStation 3, six unique weapons can be unlocked in both games. A new weapon is unlocked for use in Assassin's Creed II each time a boss in Bloodlines is defeated. Furthermore, coins acquired in Bloodlines can be transferred over as florins to Assassin's Creed II. Vice versa, in Bloodlines, extra health, the ability to block with the Hidden Blade, and the ability to shoot daggers can be unlocked by collecting Codex pages in Assassin's Creed II.

== Reception ==
Reception

Aggregate score
Aggregator	Score
Metacritic	63/100

Review scores
Publication	Score
1Up.com	B-
GameSpot	5.5/10
GameSpy	2.5/5
GameZone	5.3
IGN	6.9/10

Assassin's Creed: Bloodlines received mixed reviews from critics. It received a 5.5 from GameSpot, who praised its sound effects but heavily criticized the platforming, small areas, and over-emphasis on combat at the expense of other aspects of the game. IGN gave it a 6.9, criticizing its repetitive sound effects as well as one-dimensional combat, but praising its visuals. GameSpy gave the game a 2.5 out of 5, praising its faithfulness to the series and its gameplay while criticizing its environments, repetitive gameplay as well as poor script and voice-acting. GameZone's Louis Bedigian gave the game a 5.3/10, calling it "a great example of what can be done on the PSP visually", but that it "should in no way be considered an example of great gameplay."
