= Assassin's Creed: Memories =

2014 video game

- Developers: Ubisoft; PlayNext; GREE
- Publisher: Ubisoft
- Series: Assassin's Creed
- Platform: iOS
- Release: August 21, 2014
- Genre: Role-playing
- Modes: Single-player, multiplayer

Assassin's Creed: Memories was a mobile game developed by Ubisoft in collaboration with PlayNext and GREE. It was released for iOS devices on August 21, 2014, and combines card collecting, battling, target chasing, and strategy elements, along with the option of competitive multiplayer. Additional multiplayer options include allowing players to join a guild and engage in 20 vs. 20 guild combat scenarios. Set in the Assassin's Creed universe, the game features different historical eras, including the Third Crusade, the Golden Age of Piracy, feudal Japan, and the Mongolian Empire. The game was shut down and delisted on March 13, 2015.

== Development ==
Assassin's Creed: Memories was announced by Ubisoft on July 17, 2014, as a collaboration between Ubisoft, GREE, and PlayNext. It was quietly soft-launched in the Oceania region beforehand on July 7 as version 1.0, and officially released worldwide on August 21 as version 1.1. The game received no further updates until 15 February 2015. PlayNext issued a statement that Assassin's Creed: Memories would be shutting down. Microtransactions were disabled on February 16, and the final campaign and tournament occurred on February 23. The app itself was delisted from all digital storefronts on March 13.

== Reception ==
Assassin's Creed: Memories has an average score of 48/100 on Metacritic, indicating "generally unfavorable" reviews.
