= Assassin's Creed II: Discovery =

2009 video game

- European Nintendo DS cover art
- Developer: Griptonite Games
- Publisher: Ubisoft
- Designer: Jim Grant
- Writer: Darby McDevitt
- Series: Assassin's Creed
- Engine: HYBRID Engine 2.5
- Platforms: Nintendo DS, iOS
- Release: Nintendo DS: NA: November 17, 2009; AU: November 19, 2009; EU: November 20, 2009; iOS: NA: January 7, 2010
- Mode: Single player

Assassin's Creed II: Discovery is a 2009 action-adventure side-scrolling video game developed by Griptonite Games and published by Ubisoft. It was released for the Nintendo DS in November 2009, and for the iOS operating system in January 2010. Part of the Assassin's Creed series, it is a spin-off to Assassin's Creed II (also released in November 2009) and is set during that game's events, between Sequences 12 and 13. The story takes place from 1491 to 1492, and follows Ezio Auditore da Firenze (the protagonist of Assassin's Creed II) as he travels to Spain to help his fellow Assassins, who are being hunted by the Templar Order under the guise of the Spanish Inquisition.

The game was announced on September 9, 2009, when producer Ben Mattes officially revealed that it was in development during Apple Inc.'s keynote speech; a release date was given for November 17. The iOS version was later delayed to January 7, 2010, but Ubisoft did not comment with a reason for the delay. Assassin's Creed II: Discovery received generally positive reviews from critics, and was seen as an improvement over the previous spin-off in the series, Assassin's Creed: Altaïr's Chronicles. The iOS version of the game was removed from the App Store in 2013.

== Gameplay ==
Assassin's Creed II: Discovery is a 2.5D side-scroller game wherein players assume the role of Ezio Auditore da Firenze. Primarily set in Italy and Spain, Ezio navigates through the game's levels and accomplishes specific goals for each mission. Ezio is able to scale most buildings, as well as roll, jump, and swing through the environment. When encountering enemy guards, the player can choose to either avoid or fight them. Several guard archetypes are present within the game, such as the Halberd Guards (a stationary version of the Seekers), Captain Guards (a more agile variation of the Brute), and Archers. In combat, Ezio can make use of several weapons, including his Hidden Blades, a sword, and throwing knives. Ezio can also silently assassinate guards from different hiding spots, such as ledges, bales of hay, and wooden barrels.

Combat in the game shares many similarities with previous Assassin's Creed titles. When engaging in sword combat, players can execute chain attacks which break the defense of the enemy guards, and also perform counterattacks, which can result in an instant kill or allow for a brief moment to attack. Alongside this, players can perform clash attacks with a target, leading to a test of strength, complete with a pressure bar at the side of the display. Players then have to fight the guard's resistance in order to incapacitate them, or else Ezio will take damage.

The game features three types of memories (levels), which require the player to change the way they approach them:

- Normal - Players can approach the memory however they like and take their time to explore the environment for collectibles.
- Chase - Players have to complete the memory as quickly as possible, avoiding combat and finding the fastest routes to reach the objective. For the duration of the entire memory, the player is followed by a rain of arrows which can only be avoided if Ezio is indoors or in a hiding spot.
- Stealth - Players have to complete the memory stealthly, avoiding open combat and only using assassinations. The player can only be spotted by enemies a maximum of three times before desynchronizing from the memory, forcing the player to start it over from the beginning. There is also a time limit to complete the memory.

Similarly to later Assassin's Creed games, beginning with Brotherhood, all memories present optional objectives that need to be met in order to achieve 100% synchronization. These include completing the memory in a given amount of time, taking minimal damage, and killing as many enemies as possible.

The game also features challenge rooms which require Ezio to clear a specific objective. The challenge rooms are played in the Animus corridor, similar to the tutorial levels in the game. Cheats, dubbed "Animus hacks", are also present within the game, and can be unlocked by obtaining enough synchronization points. These hacks ranged from character skins to boosted gameplay movement and perks, which give the player an advantage or allow them to customize Ezio's outfit. However, only one hack can be used at a time, and once a level was finished with a hack activated, the level won't continue automatically to the next, instead returning the player to the level menu.

There are five types of collectibles in the game: memory paths, which can be used as in-game guides; Renaissance maps, which unlock the aforementioned challenge rooms; knives, which refill Ezio's throwing knives supply; wanted posters, which can be torn off to increase the health meter once the required amount was met; and art pieces, which are unlocked by finding hidden rooms in missions.The iPhone and Nintendo DSi versions of the game allow players to integrate their facial likeness into the game through photos, replacing Ezio's placeholder image in the wanted posters with the player's own image. Also, the art pieces found in the iPhone version can be imported for use as wallpapers.

== Plot ==
In 1491, during his search for the Apple of Eden, stolen by Girolamo Savonarola, (Note: As depicted in Assassin's Creed II's The Battle of Forlì DLC) Ezio Auditore da Firenze is summoned by his ally Antonio de Magianis to Venice to meet one of his contacts from Spain, Luis de Santángel. Representing the navigator Christopher Columbus, Luis asks Ezio to ensure the former's protection, fearing that someone is trying to assassinate him. Though initially reluctant, Ezio agrees to help after learning of Columbus's connections with the Templar grandmaster, Rodrigo Borgia. After foiling an attempt on Columbus's life, Ezio escorts him back to Luis, whereupon the two ask Ezio for a final favor: to recover an atlas from their hostel, which contains maps that detail travelling routes vital for their upcoming expedition. Ezio retrieves the atlas and brings it to Luis, who before leaving, reveals that most of the Spanish Assassin Brotherhood has been arrested by Tomás de Torquemada as part of the Spanish Inquisition.

Returning to Antonio, Ezio announces that his search for the Apple will have to be postponed, because he is travelling to Spain to reform the Brotherhood there. In Barcelona, Ezio searches for the local Assassins' headquarters, only to find it occupied by Inquisition soldiers. After escaping from the ambush, Ezio encounters an Assassin, Raphael Sánchez, who informs him that the rest of the Assassin Guild in the city were arrested on the orders of Gaspar Martínez. Ezio infiltrates Martínez's quarters and questions him about the captured Assassins. The inquisitor denies holding any Assassins prisoner, but admits that one of them is to be publicly executed. Ezio then kills Martínez, takes a list of names from his body, and saves the Assassin from being burnt alive. Returning to Raphael with the list, he recognizes the names as being Assassins from Zaragoza, and instructs Ezio to travel there and find Pedro Liorente, the Inquisition's calificador.

In Zaragoza, Ezio witnesses one of the Assassins being executed on the orders of Liorente and Tomás de Torquemada, who are following the instructions of Rodrigo Borgia himself. After rescuing the remaining Assassins, Ezio assassinates Liorente, who denies the Templars' existence before dying. He then returns to Raphael, who reveals himself to be the Treasurer to Queen Isabella and that the Assassins are fighting to stop the Inquisition, which is a Templar scheme to rid Spain of Moors. Travelling to Granada next, Ezio runs into Luis de Santángel again, who reveals that he too is an Assassin and is working at the King's court. As the Assassins begin to suspect that the Templars are planning their own expedition to uncover the New World, Ezio agrees to help Luis find a Templar spy and a passage into the besieged Alhambra palace. In the process, Ezio discovers that the Templars have been keeping King Muhammed XI captive to prolong the siege and drain the Queens' resources on the ongoing war. Ezio ultimately rescues the King and delivers the news of his abdication.

In retaliation for messing up the Templars' plan with the King, Tomás de Torquemada orders a new round of arrests and executions. Ezio prevents some arrests and assassinates the Inquisitor in charge of the operation, Juan de Marillo. Meanwhile, after hearing the news of the war ending, Christopher Columbus threatens to indulge other offers to sponsor his expedition if Queen Isabella doesn't act fast to give him an answer. Unsatisfied that the Queen is uncommitted to his cause, Columbus heads to Paris to accept an offer from King Charles. The Templars attempt to assassinate him before he reaches his destination, but Ezio saves Columbus's life again and persuades him to return to Queen Isabella, as she changed her mind after talking with Luis and Raphael.

After Columbus successfully launches his expedition, Torquemada dispatches soldiers to kill Luis and Raphael. Ezio protects both of them before tracking down and confronting Torquemada. The Grand Inquisitor denies his ties to the Templars, and claims that he only helped Rodrigo Borgia because the latter is also a man of great faith, revealing Rodrigo is canditating to become Pope. Before Ezio can kill Torquemada, the latter narrowly escapes. Reporting about his failed assassination attempt to the other Assassins, Ezio expresses his belief that Torquemada might not have been a Templar after all, (Note: This is proven to be false in the Assassin's Creed film, where Torquemada is portrayed as a Templar.) and that his death would have probably caused more turmoil rather than ending it.

== Development ==
The Apple Inc. CEO at the time, Steve Jobs, revealed the development of the game in his keynote speech on September 9, 2009. The game was released for the Nintendo DS on November 17, 2009, and for iPhone OS on January 7, 2010.

== Reception ==
Reception

Aggregate scores
Aggregator	Score
GameRankings	iOS: 79%
Metacritic	DS: 69/100

Review scores
Publication	Score
GameSpot	DS: 7/10
GameZone	DS: 8/10
IGN	DS: 8.0/10 iOS: 7.0/10
Pocket Gamer	iOS: 7/10
TouchArcade	iOS: 4/5
Slide to Play	iOS: 4/4

Assassin's Creed II: Discovery received generally positive reviews. IGN gave it an 8/10 for the Nintendo DS and a 7/10 for the iOS. GameSpot rated it a 7/10 on the Nintendo DS. Official Nintendo Magazine Australia/New Zealand was more negative, giving it 55% and praising the game for the switch to 2D and the character animation, but complaining about lackluster missions, poor level design and fiddly controls, calling it a "missed opportunity to right the first game's wrongs" and a "by the numbers platforming experience."

GameZone's Natalie Romano gave the game an 8/10, stating, "An impressive game true to the series, Assassin's Creed II: Discovery is actually an entertaining title that makes the best companion to the console version. That said, the game is far from perfect but it's easy to look past the flaws when the game is too fun to even want to put down. If you bought Assassin's Creed II then you really must buy Discovery."
