= Arno Dorian =

Assassin's Creed Character

- Assassin's Creed character
- First appearance: Assassin's Creed Unity (2014)
- Created by: Ubisoft
- Portrayed by: Dan Jeannotte; Godefroy Reding (young)

In-universe information
- Family: Charles Dorian (father); Marie Dorian (mother); François de la Serre (adoptive father); Élise de La Serre (adoptive sister/lover)
- Relatives: Callum Lynch (descendant)
- Origin: Versailles, Kingdom of France
- Nationality: French-Austrian

Arno Victor Dorian is a fictional character in Ubisoft's Assassin's Creed video game franchise. He serves as the protagonist of the 2014 game Assassin's Creed Unity, in which he is portrayed by Canadian actor Dan Jeannotte through performance capture, and voiced by Godefroy Reding as a young child. The character's other appearances include the novelization of Unity, also released in 2014; the 2017 mobile title Assassin's Creed Unity: Arno's Chronicles as its titular player character; as well as cameo appearances in the 2014 game Assassin's Creed Rogue, the 2016 live-action film adaptation of the series and the 2024 Summer Olympics opening ceremony.

Within the series' alternate historical setting, Arno was born into a French-Austrian noble family who have long been loyal to the Assassin Brotherhood, a fictional organization inspired by the real-life Order of Assassins. Arno is orphaned as a child after his father is murdered, leading to his adoption as a ward by the de la Serre family, who are secretly members of the Templar Order, the mortal enemies of the Assassins, in turn inspired by the Knights Templar military order. The romantic relationship between Arno and his childhood friend Élise de la Serre is central to the story of Unity, the events of which are set in motion when Élise's father is killed. Arno resolves to investigate the reason behind the murder and join the Assassins at the onset of the French Revolution.

The character has received a mixed critical reception, with some reviewers criticizing Arno as dull and not being particularly memorable as a series protagonist, while others praised him as a likeable character with an interesting backstory.

== Creation and development ==
Scriptwriter Travis Stout, who wrote the story for the single player campaign of Unity, explains that Arno Dorian is a lead character who constantly questions the Brotherhood of Assassins' legitimacy and belief system. He created Arno as a "very well educated young man, raised in a noble household, with access to tutors and books, and thus is very well-read", and that he has a tendency to use humor to deflect whenever he is emotionally vulnerable, and habitually quotes classical texts whenever the opportunity arises. Stout claimed that he "tried really hard" to develop an interesting character that feels like a real person, "the complete opposite of the usual grizzled tough guys spouting one-liners that gamers are used to seeing in action games and movies". He addressed the particular spelling of the character's first name, and explained that besides the fact that the phonetic spelling makes it easier to pronounce, it is in fact an older French/Germanic variation which is less common than the more conventionally French Arnaud. Stout grounds this naming in the Dorian family history, explaining that Arno's family "is a very old one and they've been Assassins for a very long time so we wanted to give him a slightly more antiquated name".

In an interview with Game Informer, Unity creative director Alex Amancio explains the conflict between Arno's character arc and Élise's goal for vengeance. Amancio emphasized that Arno joins the Assassins with the ulterior motive to resolve the mystery behind the death of Élise's father. Arno eventually develops a belief in the Assassins' cause and what they stand for, he is still constantly questioning their methods and refuses to follow their values blindly, especially since the man who raised him and the father of his love interest is a Templar. Amancio explained that both characters have the same goal though their starting point are based on different reasons: while Élise is purely driven by revenge for the murder of her father, Arno strives for redemption and attempts to find out why it occurred in the first place.

Amancio said the development team wanted to highlight the bond between Élise and Arno, and that a serious and mature love story is something Ubisoft had been wanting to portray in a video game for a long time. Amancio claimed that the developmental team saw an opportunity to develop this plot for the eighth generation of video game consoles. Amancio noted that love stories "are always a hard thing in video games because ultimately they can very easily become a tangent," and that by concepting Élise as a Templar and making that a core part of her identity, it forms part of the character's actual struggle and prevents it from becoming a "B-plot or a tangent". Inspiration was found in video games from the 2000s like Ico and Passage which also depict nuanced love stories within their narratives. Amancio noted that both are bound by the laws of their respective organizations, who are mortal enemies of each other, and the narrative explores their divergent ways of approaching a situation, and that "the closer Arno gets to Élise and her methods, the more he will stray from the Assassins and their methods. Ultimately, their goal is to obtain something and it's really what each of them willing to do to reach that goal." Amancio describes the dilemma Arno faces when it comes to choosing between love and duty as an "impossible choice".

Amancio explained that Arno does not get very involved politically in the French Revolution, with the ideals and extremism of the historical period merely provide a compelling backdrop for his personal struggles. Arno's goals with the Assassins align in that they are trying to prevent needless or senseless death; as explained by Amancio, the French Assassins are "trying to prevent the power from exploding, but they're trying to get the least involved as possible, because they also believe people have to go through their mistakes again. However, they are worried that somebody might be pulling the strings, so they're trying to find out who that is and what they're trying to accomplish."

Arno's fighting style involves the smooth executions of his targets. He is capable of swiftly running up to an enemy, kick their legs out from underneath them, and puncturing their chest with the Assassins' signature Hidden Blade. Arno also has new weapons at his disposal like the Phantom Blade, a crossbow-like attachment which adds a projectile mechanism for his Hidden Blade, and is ideal for stealthy or long-range kills. The Dead Kings downloadable content pack also introduces the Guillotine Gun, an axe that also functions like a grenade launcher or blunderbuss with a long-range attack that strikes multiple enemies at once.

=== Portrayal ===
Dan Jeannotte provides the motion-capture and voice performance for Arno Dorian in Unity. Jeannotte praised the script and writer of Unity for telling a complex and emotional story, which originally drew him to the project. Jeannotte described Arno as relatable and admirable, who uses humor as a defense or coping mechanism in the form of snappy remarks or sarcastic one-liners. Jeannotte noted that Arno is a skeptic who always questions everything about the Brotherhood of Assassins, including their cause and how they operate, and that Arno's snarky personality and tendency to raise legitimate questions is necessary in a video game where there's a necessary amount of suspension of disbelief for the plot to make sense.

Although Unity is set in Paris with many French characters, their lines in English are not delivered with French accents. Like other characters in Unity, Jeannotte used a British accent for Arno, with comparatively few dialogue or words being delivered in French. Jeannotte explained that while the developmental team had considered French accents during discussions, the final decision was made "using the cinematic conceit of having historical British accents like you would in something like the movie Gladiator". Jeannotte felt that it was appropriate as he personally did not believe that English spoken in a French accent comes across as "cool" as a British accent, and claimed that it is commonplace in cinematic depictions of foreign language settings in the English medium.

Jeannotte estimated that the script for the main storyline of Unity to be between 350 and 400 pages, which excluded dialogue for optional side missions; by comparison, a typical film script would usually come to about 120 pages at the most. The script for sound effects, such as one-liner quips or grunts when the player character gets hit, would come to about 60 pages. Jeannotte said there was not much opportunity for on-the-spot improvisation in the form of creating new or improvised lines, though he grew to understand the character quite well and would have his own interpretations of how the character would react under specific conditions. He noted that the producers are open to collaborating with voice actors, and readily take in feedback proposing potential changes to a dialogue line or movement in a certain way.

For the motion capture aspect of the character, Jeannotte wore a suit fitted with reflective markers as well as a helmet attached with a camera and microphone. He would perform in a studio set up with a large quantity of cameras that would capture movement from numerous angles; as he enacts a scene, his movements would also be followed by a few handheld cameras and booms. He recalled that the facial capture helmet took time to get used to, and he had to learn what actions are possible or impossible within the framework of the device. For a romantic scene with involved kissing between his character and another, he would rehearse it once with his scene partner without their helmets on so they could understand what the scene was like and grasp the right emotional tone for it. They would re-enact the scene with their helmets on, but with a foot far from each other. Jeannotte concluded it was "such a treat" to be able to wear a motion capture suit as a means to "embody the character physically", which helped him perform his lines better.

== Appearances ==
=== Assassin's Creed Unity ===
Arno is the protagonist of the 2014 video game Assassin's Creed Unity. Within series lore, he was born in Versailles, the Kingdom of France, in 1768, to Charles Dorian, a French Assassin, and his Austrian wife Marie. Arno's mother left the family when he was a young child after discovering Charles' affiliations, leaving him to raise Arno on his own. Like other protagonists in the Assassin's Creed series, the memories of his life and exploits as an Assassin are explored by another protagonist from the modern era, using a device capable of recreating the genetic memories of a historic individual via DNA samples.

While visiting the Palace of Versailles with his father when he is eight years old, Arno wanders off with a girl he just met, Élise de la Serre. Minutes later, Arno finds that his father has been killed, and treasures the last thing he has left from him — a gold pocket watch. Now orphaned, he is accepted by the de la Serre family as a ward. The head of the family, François de la Serre, is the Grand Master of the French Rite of the Templar Order, but out of respect for Charles Dorian's memory, he never lets Arno know about his father's true affiliations or the circumstances of his death. Arno grows close to his new kin, in particular with Élise, with whom he falls in love later in life, but has to face death once again when François is killed in 1789. Framed for the murder, Arno is arrested and sent to the Bastille, where he befriends a fellow prisoner, Pierre Bellec. Having personally known Charles Dorian and recognizing Arno's potential, Bellec teaches him how to sword fight and invites him to join the Assassin Brotherhood after they both escape during the Storming of the Bastille.

After being rejected by Élise for failing to deliver a message which could have prevented her father's death, Arno contemplates Bellec's offer and joins the Brotherhood to avenge François' death. The following five years see Arno going on a quest for redemption as he assassinates various Templars involved in the conspiracy that got his adoptive father killed. However, his methods often go against the Assassin Council's orders, who begin to question his loyalty to their cause. Through his investigation, Arno eventually uncovers the identity of the Templar at the head of the conspiracy: François-Thomas Germain, the leader of a radical faction within the Order who intend to continue the work of Jacques de Molay. Learning that Germain intends to kill Élise, Arno protects her and persuades her to seek an alliance with the Brotherhood. Bellec, who opposes the idea due to his intense hatred of the Templars, murders the Assassins' Mentor, Honoré Gabriel Riqueti, comte de Mirabeau, to prevent the alliance, leading to Arno confronting and killing Bellec atop the Sainte-Chapelle.

During the later part of the French Revolution and the beginning of the Reign of Terror, Arno works with Élise behind the Assassin Council's back to hunt down Germain and his remaining co-conspirators. Unity's alternative presentation of historical events sees Arno being personally involved with several notable events that occurred during this time period, such as the execution of Louis XVI and the arrest of Maximilien Robespierre, as well as befriending Napoleon Bonaparte. After Arno lets Germain escape during a confrontation in order to rescue Élise, the latter rejects him again and abandons him to pursue vengeance on her own. Furthermore, the Council become aware of his activities and expel him for insubordination. Arno falls into a drunken depression as a result, but is convinced to save Paris after Élise returns for him. The two work together to kill Germain in the catacombs underneath the Paris Temple, but Élise is mortally wounded during the fight. The ending of Unity, which chronologically takes place years later, sees Arno back in the Brotherhood, narrating about how his understanding of the Assassins' Creed has changed and promising to continue protecting Paris.

The Dead Kings expansion pack for Unity expands upon Arno's experiences after Élise's death. He initially falls into depression and is no longer interested in being an Assassin, refusing to act when he learns Napoleon plans to retrieve a powerful Piece of Eden from the catacombs of Saint-Denis. However, with encouragement from a young boy named Léon, he comes to terms with his past and regains his resolve, finding something else to fight for besides Élise. With Léon's help, Arno retrieves the Piece of Eden before Napoleon's traitorous captain can, and sends it to the Egyptian Brotherhood of Assassins for safe keeping.

=== Other appearances ===
Arno appears in the novelization of Unity as its co-protagonist along with Élise.

A young Arno appears in the Palace of Versailles during the ending sequence of Assassin's Creed Rogue, in which players control Charles Dorian's killer, the Assassin-turned-Templar Shay Patrick Cormac. Arno's Assassin outfit is unlockable to wear in Rogue. The remastered version of Assassin's Creed III also features an outfit themed after Arno, though it does not resemble its final design seen in Unity.

Arno makes a cameo appearance in 2016 live-action Assassin's Creed film as an apparition encountered by Michael Fassbender's character Callum Lynch. The film's novelization confirms that Arno is an ancestor of Lynch.

Arno is the player character of Assassin's Creed Unity: Arno's Chronicles, a 2017 side-scrolling mobile game released for the Huawei Honor smartphone series. The game roughly follows the same storyline as Unity.

In 2024, during the opening ceremony, Arno Dorian made an appearance carrying the olympic torch in Paris through parkour the streets and landmarks.

== Promotion and reception ==
Like other protagonists in the series, Arno Dorian has been subject to merchandise. A 16 inch tall figurine of Arno is bundled with the Collector's Edition of Unity. Arno's likeness, along with five other series protagonists, was used for a line of character-themed wine labels as part of a joint collaboration between Ubisoft and winemaker Lot18; the full name of his label is "2017 Arno Dorian Qualitätswein Niederösterreich Zweigelt", which alludes to the character's Austrian heritage. The character is described by the wine label as struggling with finding his way in the world, and is often misunderstood despite his pure intentions.

Overall critical reception for Arno has been mixed. Kimberley Wallace from Game Informer said Arno's personality is a "no-nonsense type with a sharp wit, but he doesn't hesitate to be brutal", and observed that as an Assassin, "he will go for the kill when the situation demands it, and since he only uses a single blade, he gets creative, especially when facing multiple enemies". She argued that regardless of Arno's tactics, he is a "likeable guy through and through", and claimed that it is "the one comment that has surfaced most as more people at Ubisoft are playtesting the game" prior to its launch in November 2014, and observed that since his world is full of "shades of gray", it forces him to question everything, from his allies to the woman he loves. Brenna Hillier praised the narrative in Unity as a genuine story due its focus on the characters' personal journey, as opposed to nonsensical content framed by the game's writers to fit an existing set of missions and side-content. She noted that Arno's character arc is solidly written and he has clear goals and motivations for his actions. Chris Carter from Destructoid found Arno to be "not quite as memorable as Ezio or as dashing as Edward", but nevertheless a likable and believable character in terms of how he is tied into the narrative. Writing for The New York Times, Stephen Totilo noted that players of Unity no longer have the moral certitude which justifies their player character's efforts as in many other video games, and that the conceit of a freethinking Assassin who occasionally crosses the flawed order that he joined in the first place for the Templar he loves is "a fitting plot for a game set in Paris at the time of the French Revolution, itself a drama of faltering ideals". Tom Phillips from Eurogamer further praised Arno's continued character development from the aftermath of the main storyline as presented in the Dead Kings DLC.

Conversely, other reviewers considered Arno's storyline and romance with Élise to be forgettable. In his review of Unity for Kotaku, Totilo found Arno himself to be a dull character, "whose sole interesting personality trait is that he is in love with a woman who is a Templar". Andrew Webster from The Verge found him to be an "incredibly unlikable lead" and compared him to Watch Dogs protagonist Aiden Pearce. He criticized the character for having "basically no memorable personality traits, aside from the fact that he's a sociopathic killer". Webster drew attention to a scene where he went on a killing spree just so Arno could "steal some wine and have a drink", with no indication afterwards that he has expressed remorse, other than being angry that his watch was stolen while he passed out from drinking. Both Elise Favis from The Washington Post and Marty Sliva from IGN criticized Arno as a "one dimensional" character, who brings nothing new in terms of gameplay mechanics. Andy Kelly from PC Gamer remarked that Arno starts off with a strong backstory, but gradually becomes less interesting as a character with the progression of Unity's narrative as he gradually embraces his identity as an Assassin. The character appears in several "top character" ranking lists of Assassin's Creed series protagonists with generally low placements.

Arno's lack of a French accent have attracted a negative reception. In his review of Unity for The Globe and Mail, Peter Nowak was bewildered by the fact that Unity's cast of French characters all spoke in British accents, and considered it the worst aspect of the game. Sliva criticized the decision to use British accents for quintessentially French characters like Arno and Napoleon to be "completely inexplicable and immersion-breaking". Panelists on the Australian television program Good Game produced by the Australian Broadcasting Corporation (ABC) had a similar reaction, and drew attention the fact that Ubisoft is a French company and that another series protagonist Ezio Auditore speaks with an Italian accent in previous instalments of the video game series. The panelists formed a view that while Jeannotte did a fine job as Arno's actor, a French accent would have given the character a unique quality. French website Gameblog expressed disappointment in response to Jeannotte's unflattering comments about French-accented spoken English, and insisted that the usage of a British accent does not necessarily produce a better aural experience.
