= Assassin's Creed Unity =

2014 video game

- Developer: Ubisoft Montreal (Note: Additional work by Ubisoft Annecy, Ubisoft Kyiv, Ubisoft Quebec, Ubisoft Singapore, Ubisoft Toronto, and Ubisoft Shanghai)
- Publisher: Ubisoft
- Directors: Alexandre Amancio; Marc Albinet
- Producers: Vincent Pontbriand; Antoine Vimal du Monteil; Philippe Ducharme
- Designer: Alexandre Pedneault
- Programmer: James Therien
- Artist: Mohamed Gambouz
- Writers: Sylvain Bernard; Alexandre Amancio; Travis Stout; Russell Lees; Darby McDevitt; Ceri Young
- Composers: Chris Tilton; Sarah Schachner; Ryan Amon
- Series: Assassin's Creed
- Engine: AnvilNext 2.0
- Platforms: PlayStation 4; Windows; Xbox One; Stadia
- Release: PS4, Windows, Xbox One: NA: November 11, 2014; PAL: November 13, 2014; UK: November 14, 2014; Stadia: WW: December 15, 2020
- Genres: Action-adventure, stealth
- Modes: Single-player, multiplayer

Assassin's Creed Unity is a 2014 action-adventure game developed by Ubisoft Montreal and published by Ubisoft. It was released in November 2014 for PlayStation 4, Windows, and Xbox One, and in December 2020 for Stadia. It is the eighth major installment in the Assassin's Creed series, and the successor to 2013's Assassin's Creed IV: Black Flag. It also has ties to Assassin's Creed Rogue, which was released for the previous generation consoles on the same day as Unity.

The plot is set in a fictional history of real-world events and follows the millennia-old struggle between the Assassins, who fight to preserve peace and free will, and the Templars, who desire peace through control. The framing story is set in the 21st century and features an unidentified and unseen protagonist, who joins the Assassins as an initiate to help them locate the corpse of an 18th-century Templar Grand Master. The main story is set in Paris during the French Revolution from 1789 to 1794, and follows Assassin Arno Dorian and his efforts to expose the true powers behind the Revolution, while seeking revenge against those responsible for his adoptive father's murder. Unity retains the series' third-person open world exploration as well as introducing revamped combat, parkour, and stealth systems. The game also introduces cooperative multiplayer to the Assassin's Creed series, letting up to four players engage in narrative-driven missions and explore the open world map.

Assassin's Creed Unity received mixed reviews upon release. It was praised for its visuals, customization options, setting, and characterization. Its narrative, gameplay, mission design, and multiplayer-oriented format received more divided opinions. The game was also widely panned for its numerous graphical issues and bugs, prompting Ubisoft to issue an apology and offer compensation in the form of a free expansion, Dead Kings, which acts as an epilogue to the base game's story. Players who had bought the game's season pass (which was later made unavailable for purchase in response to the controversy) additionally received a free copy of another Ubisoft title of their choice. Despite the initial critical reception, Unity was a commercial success, selling over 10 million units by May 2020. It was followed in October 2015 by Assassin's Creed Syndicate, which continues the modern-day narrative, but has its main plot set in Victorian era London.

== Gameplay ==
Assassin's Creed Unity is an action-adventure, stealth game played from a third-person perspective and set in an open world environment. The game features a historical recreation of Paris in the late 18th-century at a roughly 1:1 scale. The setting is divided into seven major districts—Le Louvre, Île de la Cité, Le Marais, La Bièvre, Les Invalides, Quartier Latin, and Ventre de Paris—and also includes the town of Versailles, located on the outskirts of Paris. The commune of Saint-Denis (renamed Franciade during the French Revolution) is featured as part of the free Dead Kings expansion pack.

A number of side missions can be found and initiated from within the open world, such as "Paris Stories", which require the player to assist a non-playable character (usually a historical figure) with a minor problem; "Murder Mysteries", in which the player investigates various murder scenes, collecting clues and interrogating witnesses to determine the culprit; and "Nostradamus Enigmas", a series of cryptic riddles that lead the player to different artifacts, which can be used to unlock a special reward. Players can also find a number of collectibles scattered around Paris, including treasure chests, cockades, and artifacts, which provide various rewards, typically in the form of new gear or cosmetic options.

Assassin's Creed Unity features a crowd system that allows more than 30,000 non-playable characters to appear on-screen simultaneously.

Unity's combat system was greatly refined over previous entries in the series, with fencing being used as an inspiration for the new system. The stealth system also saw several improvements with the addition of new features like manual crouching and the Phantom Blade, a variation of the series' signature Hidden Blade which doubles as a silent crossbow. Furthermore, the linear assassination missions from previous Assassin's Creed games were abandoned in favor of a new "Black Box" design, which offers more freedom to the player in how they go about eliminating their target; the player can explore the environment to find different entry points or possibly helpful distractions, allowing them to choose the approach that best suits them. For navigation, the game introduces new "Free-run up" and "Free-run down" commands to make it easier for the player to scale buildings in either direction, allowing them to make controlled ascents and descents at will. With the updated, larger crowds, new interactions with them are also available. The crowd regularly presents many activities, appearing organically, that the player can choose to engage in or not. Examples include scaring a group of bullies by pulling out a weapon, "settling" a fight between two civilians by killing one of them, or chasing down a thief who has just pick pocketed somebody.

For the first time in the series, the player character, Arno Dorian, presents a unique set of abilities that can be upgraded through a skill tree system, enabling the player to assign points earned through gameplay to improve Arno's skills in stealth, melee, and ranged combat, as well as his health. Players are also able to customise Arno's weapons, armor and equipment to further complement their individual style of play. The quality of these items is indicated by their level, which can be a maximum of 5 (in the case of legendary gear). Players also have a wider selection of weapons available, including swords, axes, spears, rifles, pistols and throwable items, such as smoke bombs. The Dead Kings expansion introduces an additional weapon: the Guillotine Gun - a grenade launcher with an axe head mounted under the barrel.

Like most previous Assassin's Creed titles, the game features an in-game economy system, which primarily revolves around the Café Théâtre, a former intelligence gathering front for the Assassins which has fallen into ruin and serves as Arno's main headquarters during the story. The player can renovate the Café by investing in upgrades, which change the building's interior and unlock new rooms, including a secret passage to the Assassins' underground hideout. The Café also functions as a passive business, producing revenue in the background which is deposited in a chest for Arno to collect; the more renovated the Café is, the more money it earns. Players can further increase their income by completing Café-related missions and purchasing additional taverns around Paris.

Unity also introduces cooperative multiplayer to the series. Players can enter taverns, which act as social hubs in the game, where they can see if any of their online friends are playing the game at the current time. If they are currently in a mission, they will appear as a "ghost" version of their character, allowing the player to approach them to request to join their mission. If their request is accepted, both players enter the same game session, where they can continue the mission from the last checkpoint. Up to four players can play together at the same time. Each player takes on the role of Arno, customized within their own game, with other players appearing as their own customized version of Arno and retaining their gear. Many missions and activities are available for cooperative play (all of which can also be attempted solo), but all of the main story missions are single-player only.

There are significant tie-ins with the game's Companion App, a "freemium" click app with limited "direct ties to the overall story of Unity". There are a significant number of treasure chests, assassination targets, and other collectibles that are visible to all players but only accessible to those who have completed certain goals within the app. Following an update in February 2015, this requirement is no longer necessary, meaning players who have downloaded the update, can now collect all the chests in the game without having to play the companion app.

== Synopsis ==
=== Characters ===
The main character of the game is Arno Dorian (Dan Jeannotte), a native Frenchman who was born in Versailles to an Assassin father. After his father is killed by Shay Patrick Cormac at the end of Assassin's Creed Rogue, Arno is adopted, unaware that his new family holds a senior position within the Templar Order, with his new father figure being the Templar Grandmaster. Arno blames himself when his adoptive father is murdered, and so sets out on a quest of redemption that brings him into the Brotherhood of Assassins, where he slowly rises through the ranks, much like Altaïr Ibn-La'Ahad and Ezio Auditore da Firenze as seen in previous games. Arno's love interest is Élise de la Serre (Catherine Bérubé), the daughter of the Templar Grandmaster who adopted Arno, who also sets out to investigate more about her father's death and its role in a growing ideological change within the Templar Order that threatens its core values. The era also features appearances from several historical figures, such as the Marquis de Sade (Alex Ivanovici), Maximilien Robespierre (Bruce Dinsmore), and a young Napoleon Bonaparte (Brent Skagford).

=== Setting ===
Arno's story starts in Versailles as a child, but for most of the story he is in Paris. His adventure in Paris starts on the eve of the French Revolution in 1789, and extends up to the Thermidorian Reaction in 1794. The modern day setting focuses on the Assassins contacting the player and requesting their help to explore Arno in the past, as well as helping in the present. Co-operative multiplayer missions follow the development of the Brotherhood of Assassins during the French Revolution. In addition, "time anomalies" are introduced during the story. Accessing them takes Arno to various points of Parisian history, such as Paris' Belle Époque, or its occupation by Nazi Germany during World War II.

=== Plot ===
In 2014, Abstergo releases their Helix software, which allows access to genetic memories, to the general public as a gaming device. While playing through a memory of Jacques de Molay (Mario Desmarais), in which he orders a fellow Templar to hide his codex and sword during the sacking of the Paris Temple in 1307, the player is contacted by the Assassin Brotherhood through their agent, codenamed "Bishop" (Kate Todd). Bishop invites the player to join the Assassins as an initiate, and presents an Abstergo video memo describing the capture of a Sage who contains precursor DNA. Abstergo hopes to use the Sage to compile a precursor genome. Bishop directs the Initiate to locate another Sage, whose corpse they hope to recover.

The Initiate relives the memories of Arno Dorian, a French-Austrian nobleman. Orphaned in 1776 after his father Charles was assassinated, Arno was taken in by François de la Serre, Grand Master of the French Templars. In 1789, Arno is given a message to deliver to de la Serre, but leaves it in his office and goes to meet with his childhood friend Élise, de la Serre's daughter, following her initiation into the Templar Order. Arno later finds de la Serre murdered, and is framed as the killer. He is imprisoned in the Bastille, where he befriends a fellow prisoner, Pierre Bellec (Anthony Lemke), who knew his father. Bellec invites Arno into the Brotherhood after they escape during the prison's capitulation.

Returning home, Arno is turned away by Élise, who reveals that the message he failed to deliver was a warning of her father's impending murder. Arno joins the Brotherhood to eliminate the Templars behind de la Serre's death. During his investigation, Arno rescues François-Thomas Germain (Julian Casey), a silversmith held hostage by the acting-Templar Grand Master Lafreniere (Noel Burton). Arno assassinates Lafreniere, only to discover that he was the one trying to warn de la Serre and that Germain is actually a Templar extremist who staged a coup after being banished from the Order by de la Serre. When Germain begins murdering Élise's faction of Templars, Arno persuades her to parley with the Brotherhood. The Assassin Mentor Mirabeau (Harry Standjofski) agrees to help, hoping to broker peace between the Orders, but is later murdered by Bellec, who sought to prevent the alliance and purge the Assassin leadership he saw as weak to allow the Brotherhood to be reborn. Arno is forced to kill Bellec when he tries to defend his actions as a necessary evil and convince Arno to join him.

While searching the Tuileries Palace for potentially damning letters from Mirabeau to King Louis during an insurrection, Arno encounters Napoleon Bonaparte, who helps him escape. Arno realizes that Germain plots to spark a mass revolt against the King, and assassinates the Templars aiding him with Napoleon and Élise's help, rekindling his relationship with the latter in the process. With the Revolution in full swing, Arno tracks Germain to Louis' execution, but chooses to protect Élise rather than pursue him. Élise rejects him for this, and Arno is exiled from the Brotherhood for his rash actions. Falling into a drunken depression, Arno languishes for months before he is found in Versailles by Élise, who convinces him to return as Paris is tearing itself apart during the Reign of Terror. With Élise's help, Arno discredits Maximilien Robespierre, whom Germain had placed in charge of maintaining chaos. After Arno and Élise find Robespierre, Élise shoots him in the jaw and makes him write down Germain's location.

Arno confronts Germain, who is empowered by de Molay's sword—a Sword of Eden—and pursues him to the Templar crypt underneath the Paris Temple, where Élise soon arrives to help. After Arno is temporarily incapacitated, Élise tries to take on Germain by herself, but the Sword explodes, killing Élise and mortally wounding Germain. Arno kills Germain, who confirms he is the Sage and that he wanted to purge the Templars who had forgotten de Molay's teachings. The game ends with Arno explaining how his understanding of the Creed has changed, and promising to watch over Paris and keep Élise's memory alive, having now rejoined the Brotherhood and risen to the rank of Master Assassin. Years later, Arno and Napoleon recover Germain's skeleton and they place it in the catacombs. Bishop is relieved, confident that Abstergo will not be able to find it, and tells the initiate they will be in touch.

=== Dead Kings ===
One month after Élise's death, a devastated Arno finds refuge in Franciade. He is contacted by the Marquis de Sade, who requests his help in finding the manuscript of Nicolas de Condorcet, hidden in the tomb beneath the city, in exchange for a ship to take Arno to Egypt. During his search, Arno encounters tomb raiders led by Captain Philippe Rose (Taylor Price), a subordinate of Napoleon, who wishes to retrieve an artifact—an Apple of Eden—from a Precursor temple under the city's church. Arno finds that the manuscript has been stolen by a child thief, Léon (Eamon Stocks), who was captured by the raiders. Arno rescues Léon and retrieves the manuscript, but declines to help him stop the raiders. After a vision of Élise and hearing Léon's pleas, however, he changes his mind.

After discovering the temple's location and retrieving the key from one of Napoleon's officers, Arno opens the door to the temple, but is ambushed by Rose, who has betrayed Napoleon and wishes to take the Apple for himself. Arno survives the ambush, kills Rose, and retrieves the Apple, using it to repel the remaining raiders and escape. He later meets de Sade and gives him the manuscript. Arno decides to stay in France, and contacts the Brotherhood to deliver the Apple to Egypt, far from the reach of Napoleon, who is arrested for desertion and treason. (Note: Within series lore, Napoleon's later campaign in Egypt had the goal of retrieving the Apple of Eden, which allowed him to rise to power as First Consul and eventually Emperor of the French.)

== Development ==
Development for the game began shortly after the completion of 2010's Assassin's Creed: Brotherhood, with the core development team splitting off during the early stages of development on Assassin's Creed III. On March 19, 2014, early screenshots of the game were leaked, as well as its title Unity. The leak revealed that Unity would feature a new location and time period, Paris during the French Revolution, a new assassin, and that it would be released in late 2014 on PlayStation 4 and Xbox One. On March 21, Ubisoft confirmed the game's existence, having been in development for more than three years, by releasing pre-alpha game footage. They also confirmed the game's release date of Q4 2014, and that it would also see a release on Windows. Ubisoft writer Jeffrey Yohalem revealed that the French Revolution setting for the game was deliberately teased, along with Assassin's Creed III's American Revolution setting, in symbols seen at the end of Brotherhood. Ubisoft Montreal is the lead developer for the project, with contributing work from the Ubisoft studios in Toronto, Kyiv, Singapore, Shanghai, Annecy, Montpellier, Bucharest, Quebec, and Chengdu.

At E3 2014, trailers were released for the game, demonstrating the game's cooperative multiplayer mode for up to four players, a first for the series. The trailer featured Lorde's cover of "Everybody Wants to Rule the World", which was produced by Michael A. Levine and Lucas Cantor. The development team was able to use the new power of the PlayStation 4 and Xbox One to improve the NPC crowds. Up to 1000 individual AI characters can appear in a crowd, each acting independently and reacting to each other as well as the player's actions. The PC version of the game uses Nvidia's GameWorks technology such as TXAA anti-aliasing, advanced DX11 tessellation and Nvidia PhysX technology, due to a partnership between Ubisoft and Nvidia.

Lead game designer Benjamin Plich has said this game will be more difficult than previous entries thanks to the removal of the counter button and more aggressive guards. Plich also said that the game will feature synchronized Double Assassinations.

In August 2014, Assassin's Creed Rogue was announced for the PlayStation 3 and Xbox 360 and was revealed to have ties to the story in Unity.

The game is written in a combination of C++ and C#, totaling an estimated 15.5 million lines of code of the former, and five million of the latter.

=== Historical representation ===
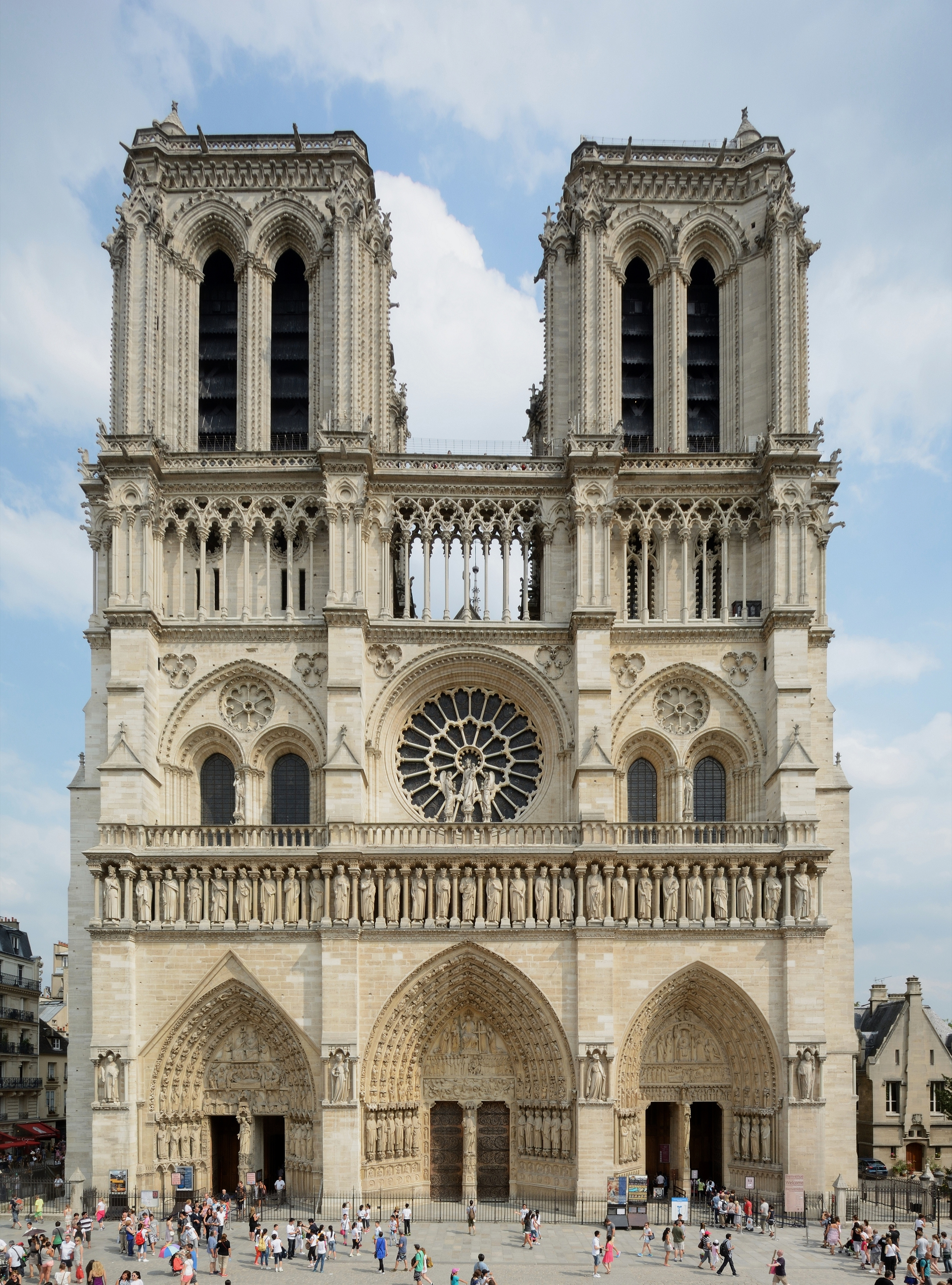
Among the many landmarks featured in Unity is the Notre-Dame de Paris, whose in-game model took well over a year to recreate.

On October 6, 2014, Ubisoft announced that they had enlisted the help of academic historians such as Laurent Turcot, professor at Université du Québec à Trois-Rivières for daily life of 18th-century Paris, and Jean Clement Martin, a professor at the Sorbonne, to revise the script.

Like other games in the series, Unity portrays a number of real world landmarks. Unity's recreation of Paris includes the Tuileries Palace, Notre-Dame Cathedral, and, through a "time anomalies" feature, the Eiffel Tower and the Statue of Liberty, neither of which existed at the time of the French Revolution. Since the April 2019 fire, there have been persistent, unsubstantiated rumours that Ubisoft had sufficiently accurate scans of Notre-Dame that may help in the reconstruction of the cathedral, despite people involved in Assassin's Creed Unity having acknowledged their own reproduction of the building isn't historically accurate. Ubisoft donated €500,000 to the reconstruction of the cathedral and also provided Unity as a free download for the week following the event so as to give everyone a chance to explore the cathedral as they had modeled it in game. Ubisoft reused the Notre Dame model for a virtual reality interactive tour entitled Notre-Dame de Paris: Journey Back in Time, a subset of the original game's setting which allows users with a compatible virtual reality headset to explore the cathedral's interior and exterior.

== Release ==
The game was originally intended to be released worldwide on October 28, 2014. However, on August 28, 2014, it was delayed until November 11, 2014, in North America; November 13, 2014, in Europe and Australasia; and November 14, 2014, in the United Kingdom. On the delay, Vincent Pontbriand, senior producer at Ubisoft, said, "As we got close to the finish, we realized we were near the target but still needed a bit more time to hone some of the details to make sure Assassin's Creed Unity is exceptional." Additionally, the game received a day one patch with further updates to the game.

In March 2026, an update that improved performance and allowed the game to run in 4K at 60 frames per second on the PlayStation 5 and Xbox Series X/S was released for the PlayStation 4 and Xbox One versions of the game.

== Reception ==
=== Critical reception ===
Reception

Aggregate score
Aggregator	Score
Metacritic	(XONE) 72/100 (PC) 70/100 (PS4) 70/100

Review scores
Publication	Score
Destructoid	7/10
Eurogamer	7/10
Game Informer	8/10
GameSpot	7/10
GamesRadar+	4/5
GameTrailers	8/10
Giant Bomb	2/5
IGN	7.8/10
Joystiq	2.5/5
Official Xbox Magazine (UK)	8/10
PC Gamer (US)	65/100
Polygon	6.5/10
VideoGamer.com	8/10

Assassin's Creed Unity received "mixed or average" reviews from critics upon release, according to review aggregator website Metacritic.

Matt Miller from Game Informer gave the game 8/10, praising the detailed environment and architecture, decent voice acting, strategy-required missions, challenging gameplay and well-paced story missions, but criticizing the controls and balance, as well as game-breaking technical issues. He also stated that both the navigation system and the combat system still needed to be improved. Louise Blain from GamesRadar gave the game 4/5, praising the dense and atmospheric game world, character-focused mission design, overhauled free-running mechanics, in-depth character customization and satisfying combat. However, she criticized the game's framerate and poor enemy AI design.

Chris Carter from Destructoid gave the game 7/10, praising the new movement system, likable lead characters, iconic setting, smooth animation and improved draw distance. New additions such as character customization and huge crowds were also praised. However, he criticized the predictable story, technical issues, and the mission design of co-op multiplayer, as it is impossible to play some missions solo. He stated that "Unity feels like a step back. ... It lacks that grand sense of roaming the uncharted seas in Assassin's Creed IV: Black Flag, or even the open-ended feel of the wilderness in Assassin's Creed III, but it's a journey worth taking if you're already into the series." Tom Bramwell from Eurogamer gave the game 7/10, praised the setting, rich content, inspiring story and interesting side-missions. However, he criticized the over-familiar and unimaginative mission-design, overzealous auto-correct system in the free-running mechanics and the lack of weapon customization. He described the game as a "missed opportunity".

Marty Sliva from IGN gave the game 7.8/10, praising the recreation of Paris and ambitious ideas presented in the multiplayer, but criticizing the unrefined stealth, weak story and lack of a strong lead character. He stated that "the true new-gen Assassin's Creed game is a gorgeous, entertaining, and successful proof of concept for what lies ahead for the series, though it isn't what I'd call revolutionary."

Tom Senior from PC Gamer gave the game 65/100, saying that "Unity could become a perfectly enjoyable part of the Assassin's Creed canon. It's a solid campaign elevated by quality assassination missions and an extraordinary setting that might just push the big number at the bottom of this review into the 80s, but with a big selling point out of operation, a raft of technical issues, performance problems, microtransactions and stilted combat and free-running systems, Unity—in its current state—can only be considered a failed revolution." Sam Prell from Joystiq gave the game 2.5/5, saying that "It's hard not to appreciate everything that it [Unity] gets right, and you'll have a good time if you can wrangle some friends for co-op, but it's impossible to ignore where Unity falls tragically short." PC World stated that the game "is a new low for the Assassin's Creed series." The review also criticized Assassin's Creed Unity for its small scale, poor gameplay, and high minimum system requirements. Similarly, CNET stated that "[w]hile it will likely suffice for Assassin's Creed core fans, Unity stumbles throughout and never really finds its footing."

During the 18th Annual D.I.C.E. Awards, the Academy of Interactive Arts & Sciences nominated Assassin's Creed Unity for outstanding achievement in "Animation", "Art Direction", and "Sound Design".

=== Technical issues and developer response ===
Upon release, Assassin's Creed Unity was subject to widespread bugs and glitches, as well as performance and online connectivity issues. Ubisoft Montreal CEO Yannis Mallat apologized on behalf of the studio with regard to the poor launch of Unity, stating that the "overall quality of the game was diminished by bugs and unexpected technical issues", and prevented users from "experiencing the game at its fullest potential". In response to the issues, Ubisoft announced that it would halt sales of the game's season pass and Gold Edition, and offer the first downloadable content (DLC) pack, Dead Kings, for free. As compensation, those who bought the season pass received a free digital download of one of six Ubisoft games (Assassin's Creed IV: Black Flag, The Crew, Far Cry 4, Just Dance 2015, Rayman Legends, or Watch Dogs), and would also "continue to have access to a variety of additional content [for Unity], including Assassin's Creed Chronicles: China". To claim the game, however, users had to forfeit their right to sue Ubisoft with regard to the game and the devaluation of the season pass.

In February 2016, Ubisoft announced that it would not be announcing any additional Assassin's Creed games for the rest of the year, citing the many issues of Unity and stating that, "we've learned a lot based on your feedback." In this statement, Ubisoft pledged its commitment to evolve the game's mechanics in order to create "more enjoyable games". This news has possible connections to Ubisoft's third quarter financial report, which was released on the same day, and states that Assassin's Creed Syndicate had a "slower launch than expected."

=== Criticism by French Left Party ===
The French Left Party and its frontman Jean-Luc Mélenchon criticized the historical interpretation the game was conveying about the French Revolution, depicting Robespierre as "a blood-thirsty monster" and Marie Antoinette as "a poor little girl". He has described Ubisoft's version of the historical period as "propaganda" that builds upon the growing sense of self-hatred spreading throughout France. Mélenchon has expressed his criticisms in multiple media appearances, telling the New York Times that, "Smearing the great revolution is dirty work that aims to instill the French with even more self-loathing and talk of decline. If we continue like this, no common identity will remain possible for the French besides religion and skin color."

Alexis Corbière, national secretary of the Left Party, said that "the game was conveying all the counter-revolutionary clichés that have been forged for two centuries". He added "To everyone who's gonna buy Assassin's Creed Unity, I wish you a nice time. But I also tell you that having fun doesn't prevent you from thinking. Just play it, but don't let yourself be manipulated by the propaganda."

Without mentioning the criticism specifically, in an interview published on October 6, 2014, by Time, the game's creative director Alex Amancio said "What we actually try to do, and I think this is just a personal belief that we have, is to avoid reducing history... We try very hard to portray things as factually as possible." Despite this, game producer Antoine Vimal du Monteil answered that, ultimately, "Assassin's Creed Unity is a mainstream video game, not a history lesson."

=== Sales ===
As of December 31, 2014, Ubisoft has shipped a combined 10 million units of Assassin's Creed Unity and Assassin's Creed Rogue. From April 17 to 25, 2019, Ubisoft made the PC version available free of charge with a message encouraging donations to restore Notre Dame de Paris following the fire there on April 15, 2019. Thanks to this, Ubisoft donated €500,000 to help with the restoration and reconstruction of Paris' historic landmark. In May 2020, Ubisoft revealed that Assassin's Creed Unity (and ten other games published by them in the eighth console generation) had sold over ten million units by March 2020.

== Controversies ==
=== Gender options in cooperative mode ===
We recognize the valid concern around diversity in video game narrative. Assassin's Creed is developed by a multicultural team of various faiths and beliefs and we hope this attention to diversity is reflected in the settings of our games and our characters. Assassin's Creed Unity is focused on the story of the lead character, Arno. Whether playing by yourself or with the co-op Shared Experiences, you the gamer will always be playing as Arno, complete with his broad range of gear and skill sets that will make you feel unique. With regard to diversity in our playable Assassins, we've featured Aveline, Connor, Adewale and Altaïr in Assassin's Creed games and we continue to look at showcasing diverse characters. We look forward to introducing you to some of the strong female characters in Assassin's Creed Unity.

— Ubisoft's response to the all-male character models for the cooperative mode.

After the cooperative multiplayer mode was revealed at E3 2014, additional information about the mode was revealed by creative director Alex Amancio and technical director James Therien. Amancio stated that the mode did not include the ability to play as a female avatar, due to "the reality of production". Amancio added by saying, "It's double the animations, it's double the voices, all that stuff and double the visual assets. Especially because we have customizable assassins. It was really a lot of extra production work," which was echoed by Therien. Level designer Bruno St-André expanded on this by stating that an estimated 8,000 additional animations would have had to be recreated for a female avatar.

This caused dissatisfaction in some video game community outlets. Brenna Hillier of VG247 noted how there were nine development teams working on the game, and said "Ubisoft has here trotted out a tired, stupid, constantly refuted excuse for why it has perpetuated the cycle of sexism and under-representation in the games industry." Tim Clark of PC Gamer made note "that previous Assassin's Creed games have had playable women as part of the multiplayer component, and that Brotherhood had you supported by on-call assassins, many of whom were female, so it's hardly like it can't be done." Clark also looked to the way Amancio and Therien answered the question and felt how they referenced "how much the team wanted to include playable female characters suggests... that this is probably a decision which hasn't gone down well internally." Former Assassin's Creed designer Jonathan Cooper responded by saying, "In my educated opinion, I would estimate this to be a day or two's work. Not a replacement of 8,000 animations." He also revealed that Aveline de Grandpré, the female protagonist of Assassin's Creed III: Liberation, "shares more of Connor Kenway's animations than Edward Kenway does." Fans also created petitions urging Ubisoft to change their stance. Additionally, former Assassin's Creed game designer Patrice Désilets commented that Amancio's reasoning was valid, but that Ubisoft should put in the effort to let players have gender options.

Amidst the community response, Insomniac Games published a video of their then-upcoming game Sunset Overdrive. Taking a community question "Can you play as a female character?", the presenter answers positively while the player character is shown as a female dressed up to resemble Ezio Auditore.

Amancio attempted to clear up any confusion, by stating, "I understand the issue, I understand the cause, and it is a noble one, but I don't think it's relevant in the case of Unity. In Unity you play this character called Arno, and when you're playing co-op you're also playing Arno – everybody is. It's like Aiden Pearce in Watch Dogs... Arno has different skills - you select skill points in the game, there are gear elements that have an impact and all these weapons that make the character you make your own. But you're always playing Arno... The reason we're just changing the face and keeping the bodies is we want people to show off the gear that they pick up in the game through exploration. That's why we kept that."

=== Platform parity ===
In October 2014, Ubisoft's senior producer Vincent Pontbriand made a statement that all console versions of the game would be locked at the same resolution of 900p. This was done "... to avoid all the debates and stuff." Many readers took this in reference to how the PlayStation 4 and Xbox One are constantly compared in the media for raw power, presuming that the PlayStation 4 version of the game's resolution was lowered to reach parity with the Xbox One's, but Ubisoft later denied that this was the reason.

Instead, Pontbriand stated that the decision for parity came from the limitations of the consoles' CPUs. The number of NPCs and general amount of AI was paramount to keeping the game locked at 30 frames per second.
