= Paul-Henri Marron =

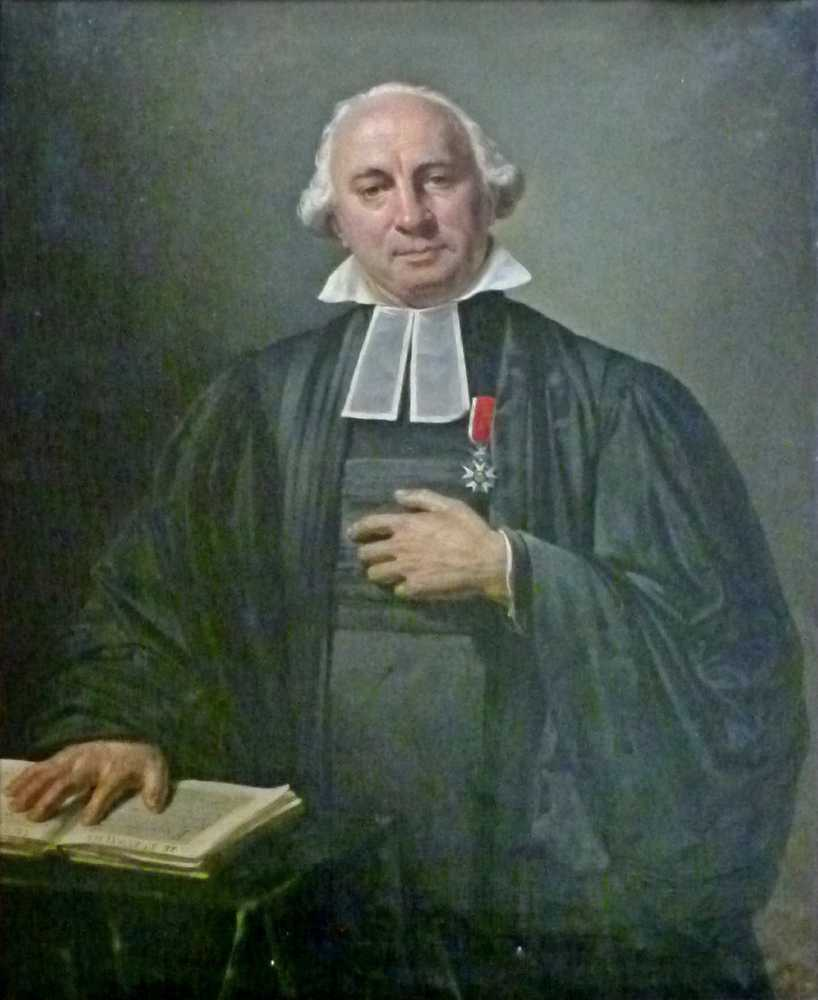
- Paul-Henri Marron, the first pastor of the Reformed Church in Paris
- Born: April 25, 1754; Leyden
- Died: July 31, 1832 (aged 78); Paris
- Education: Academy of Leyden
- Occupation: Pastor
- Years active: 1775-1832
- Church: Reformed Church of France
- Ordained: 1774
- Writings: Paul-Henri Marron à la citoyenne Hélène-Marie Williams
- Congregations served: Walloon church of Dordrecht (1775-82), Dutch embassy in Paris (1782-88), Saint-Louis-du-Louvre (1790-1811), l'Oratorie du Louvre (1811-32)
- Title: Pasteur

Paul-Henri Marron was the first Reformed pastor in Paris following the French Revolution. Born in the Netherlands to a Huguenot family, Marron first came to Paris as the chaplain of the Dutch embassy. Protestants in France had been prohibited from worshipping openly since the Revocation of the Edict of Nantes in 1685. The Edict of Tolerance in 1787 gave non-Catholics the right to openly practice their religion. Marron was recruited to lead the newly tolerated Protestant community of Paris, a task he accomplished through the French Revolution, several imprisonments, the Napoleonic Wars, the Bourbon Restoration and into the July Monarchy.

== Biography ==
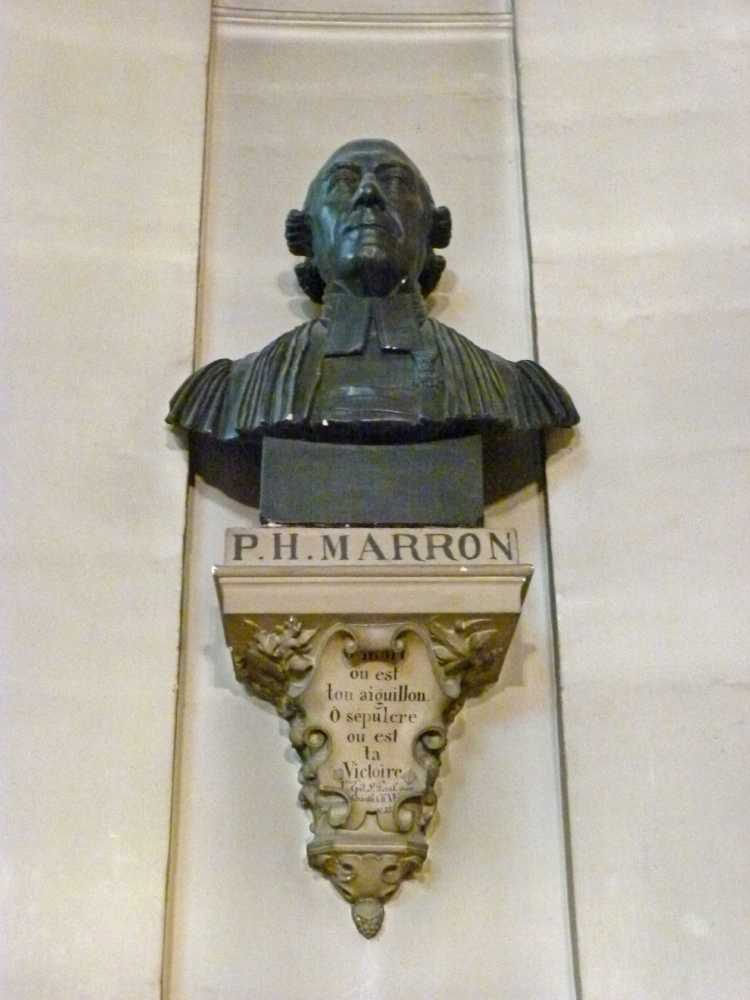
A bust of Pastor Paul-Henri Marron in the sacristy of l'Oratoire du Louvre

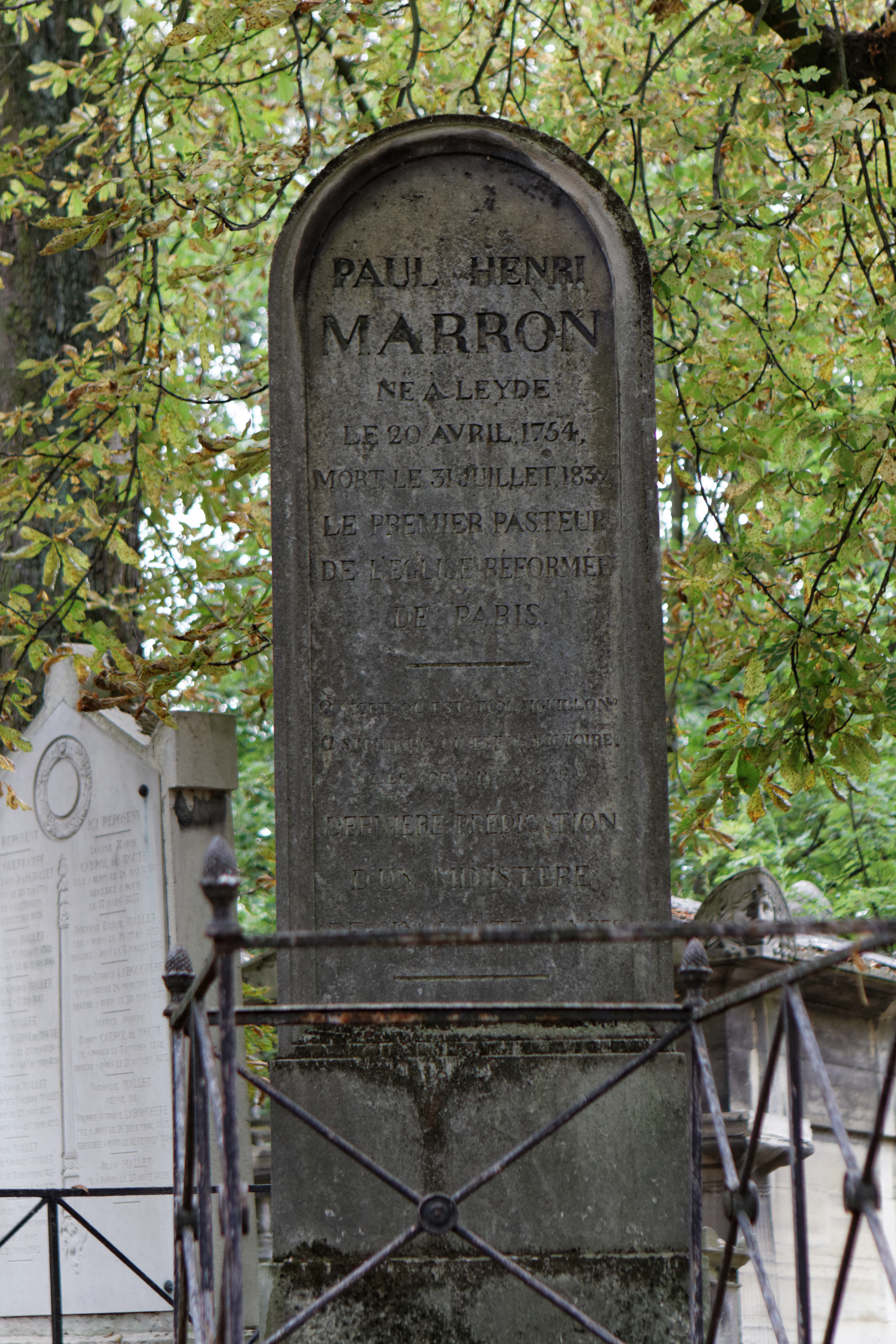
Marron's tomb

=== Early life ===
Marron was born in Leyden in 1754 to a Huguenot family who had fled to the Netherlands as refugees from Saint-Paul-Trois-Châteaux in the Drôme department of France. He studied theology at Leyden and was ordained at the age of 20. He was called as the pastor of the Walloon church of Dordrecht in 1776.

=== Paris ===
In 1782 he moved to Paris to serve as the chaplain of the Dutch ambassador. A Protestant worship service in the French language had been allowed at the Dutch embassy since the Treaty of Utrecht in 1713 providing one of the only means for French Protestants to participate in a worship service. After the Edict of Tolerance in 1787 Jean-Paul Rabaut Saint-Étienne recruited Marron to serve as the first pastor of the Protestant community of Paris.

The new congregation first met on June 7, 1789, in the back room of a wine shop at the corner of rue Mondétour and rue du Cygne. Some of the faithful were distressed to sing the Psalms in a place that was home to more bacchanalian tunes. The church moved to 18 rue Dauphine in February, 1790, where Antoine Court de Gébelin, the famous interpreter of the Tarot, had held his meetings. In 1791, at the behest of Jean Sylvain Bailly, the mayor of Paris, and the Marquis de Lafayette, a recently suppressed church, Saint-Louis-du-Louvre was rented to the Protestants for the annual sum of 16,450 livres.

On July 20, 1792, Marron came from Holland to America to deliver the funeral oration for John Paul Jones.

In 1811 Napoleon decided to demolish Saint-Louis-du-Louvre to make way for an expansion of the Louvre. As a replacement building he gave Marron's congregation l'Oratoire du Louvre.

=== Death ===
Marion died on July 31, 1832, from a cholera epidemic and was buried in the Père Lachaise Cemetery. He was still the preacher at l'Oratoire at the time of his death and was succeeded by Athanase Coquerel. His tomb is inscribed with 1 Corinthians 15:55, the last passage on which he preached during a career of more than fifty years:

O mort, où est ton aiguillon?

O sépulchre, où est ta victoire?

O death, where is your sting?

O grave, where is your victory?

== Bibliography ==
Garrisson, Francis (1991). "Genèse de l'Eglise réformée de Paris, 1788-1791". Bulletin de la SHPF. 127. Paris: 25.
Braunstein, Philippe (2011). L'Oratoire du Louvre et les protestants parisiens. Paris: Labor et Fides. ISBN 978-2830914320.
