= François-Thomas Germain =

French silversmith

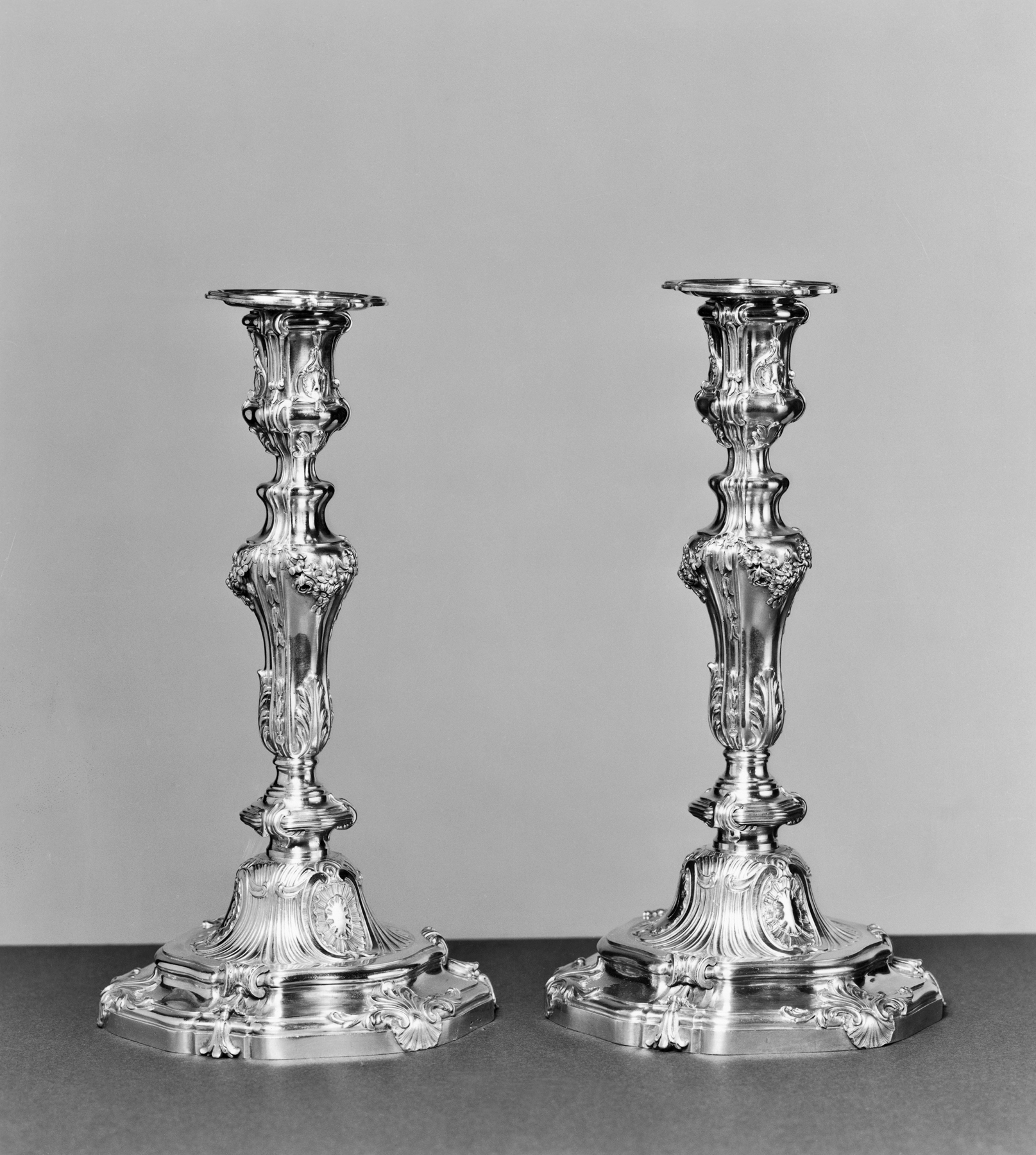
- Germain is thought to have introduced this popular model of candlestick in Paris in 1757–1758.
- Born: 1726; Paris, Kingdom of France
- Died: 23 January 1791 (aged 64); Paris, Kingdom of France
- Occupations: Silversmith, sculptor
- Parent(s): Thomas Germain (father); Anne-Denise Gauchelet (mother)

François-Thomas Germain (1726 – 23 January 1791) was a French silversmith who was often commissioned by European royalty. In addition to his work for the French court, François-Thomas Germain also received notable commissions from foreign courts, including a large order from Empress Elizabeth of Russia and significant commissions from the Portuguese court. He inherited the title of royal silversmith and sculptor to the King of France from his father, Thomas Germain. In 1765, Germain broke guild regulations by working with financiers to receive some debts owed to him, as he was only allowed to enter into partnerships with his fellow smiths. For this he was forced to resign his position and declare bankruptcy.

Germain died out of the public eye in 1791, the last member of his distinguished family to serve as a royal smith. Many of his works are now held in museums and private collections.

Due to the French Revolution and other hazards of history, the biggest portion of his production now belongs to countries other than France—namely Portugal and Russia.

== In popular culture ==
A fictionalized version of Germain appears in the 2014 video game Assassin's Creed Unity, as a member of the Templar Order and the main antagonist. He was chosen for the game because of his real-life talent and "unexplained demise."
