= Noah Watts =

Native American actor and musician (born 1983)

Noah Watts (born December 29, 1983) is a Native American actor and musician, a member of the Crow Tribe, and a descendant of the Blackfeet Nation. He bears the Crow name Bulaagawish, which means "Old Bull". He is best known for his portrayal of the character Ratonhnhaké:ton / Connor in the Assassin's Creed franchise.

== Biography ==
Noah Watts is a descendant of the Blackfeet Nation. He was born in Livingston, Montana, and grew up in Bozeman, Montana.

== Career ==
At the age of 17, while a senior in high school, Noah's first professional audition landed him a role in the film The Slaughter Rule. After filming for The Slaughter Rule was complete, he took three weeks off from school to act in the Chris Eyre film Skins. He graduated Bozeman High School in May 2001 and soon won a scholarship to attend the American Academy of Dramatic Arts in Los Angeles.

During his first semester at AADA, Noah was offered a part in a Chris Eyre film titled Skinwalkers as a teenage gang-leader and suspected murderer—a role far different from the shy, devoted son he played in Skins.

In the Southwest Repertory Company's production of the play "The Indolent Boys", written by N. Scott Momaday, Noah played the role of a young Native man in a boarding school in the 1800s, who was being trained to be a Christian missionary, but is conflicted between his Native culture and the Christian religion inculcated.

In the spring of 2005, Watts was cast in Native Voices at the Autry's Native American adaptation of William Shakespeare's Romeo and Juliet entitled Kino and Teresa, written by James Lujan (Taos Pueblo), where he played the villain Eladio (an adaption of Tybalt). Noah also took part in an independent film entitled The Last Beyond as Joe Running Elk, a young man during the Great Depression who begins a life of adventure outside the law after losing his job working on the railroad.

Native Voices at the Autry cast Noah as the lead character in "Salvage" written by Diane Glancy (Cherokee) and directed by Sheila Tousey (Menominee, Stockbridge Munsee) in 2008. The play, set in Browning, Montana, was remounted in 2009 for Borderlands Origins Festival in London, England at The Riverside Studios.

=== Assassin's Creed ===
In 2012, Watts performed his first major voice acting role as Ratonhnhaké:ton (or Connor), the protagonist of Assassin's Creed III, for whom he also provided motion capture and facial animation. He reprised the role in a minor capacity in Assassin's Creed III: Liberation, also released in 2012, and the Aveline DLC chapter for Assassin's Creed IV: Black Flag, released in 2013. After a decade, he returned to voice the character in the virtual reality game Assassin's Creed Nexus VR, released in 2023.

When auditioning for Assassin's Creed III, Watts did not know anything about the job except that it was a period piece about the American Revolutionary War. When he got the role of Connor, Watts had to sign a nondisclosure document that revealed that he would be in an Assassin's Creed game. After years of voice acting on television shows and films, Watts reported that the shift to voice acting for a video game was challenging, but he felt that he had a real connection with the character of Connor. There was also the challenge of Watts learning and speaking Kanien'kéha Mohawk; being part Crow and Blackfeet, Watts not only had to learn a completely different language, but also a different culture because his tribe are plains Indians.

== Music ==
Since his appearance in the Assassin's Creed franchise, Watts has been pursuing a music career. After being offered a job to be a guitar player for a co-worker’s band, Watts started taking his music career more seriously. Watts played for four different bands as a hired guitarist before quitting to pursue his own songs and forming his own band, Nickels and Bones, whose music style resembles punk rock. Watts has expressed plans to start a new band with new members, and values his writing and sound because he loves the limitless opportunities that come with music. Although he loves acting, Watts has noted that his music is his passion because he is able to express his own words, and that is the one thing he cares about.

== Filmography ==
=== Films ===
- The Slaughter Rule (2002) – Waylon Walks Alone
- Skins (2002) – Herbie Yellow Lodge
- Skinwalkers (2002) (TV movie) – Ruben Maze
- The Last Beyond (2019) – Joe Running Elk

=== TV series ===
- Sons of Anarchy (2009) – Ferdinand
- Big Love (2010) – Croupier
- The Glades (2010) – Billy
- CSI: Miami (2011) – Cesar Soto
- Ringer (2011–2012) – Daniel Eknath

=== Video games ===
- Red Dead Redemption (2010) – The Local Population
- Assassin's Creed III (2012) – Ratonhnhaké:ton (Connor)
- Assassin's Creed III: Liberation (2012) – Ratonhnhaké:ton (Connor)
- Assassin's Creed III: The Tyranny of King Washington (2013) – Ratonhnhaké:ton (Connor)
- Assassin's Creed IV: Black Flag – Aveline (2013) – Ratonhnhaké:ton (Connor)
- Assassin's Creed Nexus VR (2023) – Ratonhnhaké:ton (Connor)

=== Stage acting ===
- The Indolent Boys (2002) – John Pai
- Kino and Teresa (2005) – Eladio
- Salvage (2008, 2009) – Wolf
