= Assassin's Creed (film) =

2016 film by Justin Kurzel

- Theatrical release poster
- Directed by: Justin Kurzel
- Screenplay by: Michael Lesslie; Adam Cooper; Bill Collage
- Based on: Assassin's Creed by Ubisoft
- Produced by: Jean-Julien Baronnet; Gérard Guillemot; Frank Marshall; Patrick Crowley; Michael Fassbender; Conor McCaughan; Arnon Milchan
- Starring: Michael Fassbender; Marion Cotillard; Jeremy Irons; Brendan Gleeson; Charlotte Rampling; Michael K. Williams
- Cinematography: Adam Arkapaw
- Edited by: Christopher Tellefsen
- Music by: Jed Kurzel
- Production companies: New Regency Productions; Ubisoft Motion Pictures; DMC Film; The Kennedy/Marshall Company
- Distributed by: 20th Century Fox
- Release dates: December 13, 2016 (AMC Empire 25); December 21, 2016 (United States); January 1, 2017 (United Kingdom)
- Running time: 115 minutes
- Countries: United Kingdom; United States
- Languages: English; Spanish
- Budget: $125 million
- Box office: $240.7 million

Assassin's Creed is a 2016 science fiction action film directed by Justin Kurzel, based on the video game series by Ubisoft. It stars Michael Fassbender, Marion Cotillard, Jeremy Irons, Brendan Gleeson, Charlotte Rampling and Michael K. Williams. The film is set in the same universe as the video games but features an original story. The plot revolves around Callum "Cal" Lynch (Fassbender), who is abducted by Abstergo Industries because of his heritage. Cal's ancestor, Aguilar de Nerha, was a member of the Assassin Brotherhood active during the Spanish Inquisition in the late 15th-century, who swore to protect the Apple of Eden, an artifact believed to contain the key to humanity's free will. Cal must accept his Assassin heritage and stop Abstergo, the Templar Order of the modern-day, from finding the Apple and using it to enslave humanity.

A film adaptation of Assassin's Creed was announced in October 2011. Fassbender joined the project in July 2012 and in January 2013, Michael Lesslie was hired to write the screenplay. In April 2014, Adam Cooper and Bill Collage were hired to rewrite the script, while Kurzel was in talks to direct. The remaining cast were hired between February and early August of 2015. Principal photography began in late August 2015 and concluded in January 2016.

Assassin's Creed premiered at the AMC Empire 25 in New York City on December 13, 2016, and was released in the United States on December 21, and in the United Kingdom on January 1, 2017, by 20th Century Fox. The film received generally negative reviews from critics, and underperformed at the box-office, grossing $241 million against a $125 million budget. A sequel was planned, but due to the film's negative reception and disappointing box-office result, it was cancelled.

== Plot ==
In 1492 Andalusia, during the Granada War, Aguilar de Nerha is accepted into the Assassin Brotherhood and assigned to protect Prince Ahmed of Granada from the Templar Order. In 1986, adolescent Callum "Cal" Lynch finds his mother Mary killed by his father, Joseph, an Assassin. Gunmen led by Alan Rikkin, CEO of the Templars' Abstergo Industries, arrive to capture Joseph, who persuades his son to escape.

In 2016, Cal is sentenced to death for murdering a pimp, but Abstergo fakes his execution and takes him to their research facility in Madrid. The Templars are after an Apple of Eden, an artifact built by a long-lost civilization. Using the Apple's code, they can control humanity's free will and eliminate violence. Cal is a descendant of Aguilar, the last person confirmed to be in possession of the Apple. Sofia, Alan's daughter and the head scientist, puts Cal in the Animus, a machine which allows him to relive (and the scientists to observe) Aguilar's genetic memories, so that Abstergo can learn the Apple's whereabouts.

In 1492, Aguilar and his partner, María, are deployed to rescue Ahmed, who has been kidnapped by the Templar Grand Master Tomas de Torquemada, to coerce Ahmed's father, the Sultan of Granada, to surrender the Apple. Aguilar and María intercept the Templars, but are overpowered and captured by Torquemada's enforcer, Ojeda. Sofia then pulls Cal out of the Animus.

Cal encounters other Assassin descendants held captive at the facility, most of whom are suspicious of him, with the exceptions of Lin, a descendant of 16th-century Chinese Assassin Shao Jun; and Moussa, a descendant of 18th-century Haitian Assassin Baptiste. Cal begins experiencing hallucinations, dubbed "the Bleeding Effect", of both Aguilar and Joseph. During their sessions, Sofia confides in Cal that her mother was likewise murdered by an Assassin, sharing his hatred of the Brotherhood.

Back in the Animus, Aguilar and María are scheduled for execution at an auto da fe but he manages to free them, leading to a rooftop chase in which they escape through a "Leap of Faith". Cal's mind reacts violently to the session and he is temporarily paralyzed. After learning that Joseph is also at the facility, Cal seeks him out and confronts him over Mary's death. Joseph explains that the Bleeding Effect will allow him to gain Aguilar's skills. He also reveals that Mary was an Assassin and chose to die by Joseph's hand rather than be forced into the Animus. Unconvinced, Cal vows to destroy the Assassins by finding the Apple.

Reaffirmed by his encounter with Joseph, Cal enters the Animus. Aguilar and María ambush a meeting between Muhammad and Torquemada; they kill Torquemada's men and recover the Apple, but Ojeda captures María. She chooses to die to protect the Apple and stabs herself on Ojeda's blade, allowing Aguilar to kill Ojeda and escape through another Leap; the force of which causes the Animus to malfunction. Aguilar later gives the Apple to Christopher Columbus, who vows to take it to his grave. When Moussa and the modern Assassin prisoners start a riot to escape, Alan orders the facility purged. Abstergo security kills Joseph and most of the other prisoners. Cal stands in the Animus chamber and is met with projections of his ancestors, including Aguilar, Arno Dorian, Joseph and his mother, while Sofia glimpses the projection of an Assassin resembling her. Persuaded by his mother, Cal embraces his Assassin heritage and, having fully assimilated Aguilar's abilities, joins Moussa and Lin in escaping the facility.

Having retrieved the Apple from Columbus' burial vault, the Templars convene at a ceremony in their London sanctuary to celebrate their triumph. Inside the sanctuary, a disillusioned Sofia meets Cal, who has come to take the Apple, and she reluctantly allows him to act. Cal retrieves the Apple, killing Alan in the process. As Sofia vows revenge, the Assassins depart, swearing once again to protect the Apple from the Templars.

== Cast ==
- Michael Fassbender as Callum "Cal" Lynch and Aguilar de Nerha:
  An original character created for the film, Cal is a descendant of the Assassins, with genetic links to Aguilar, an Assassin active in 15th-century Spain. Cal has been running his whole life, ever since he witnessed his mother's murder as a child. But living on society's fringes has also kept him shrouded from the secrets of his ancestry. Awaiting execution on death row, Cal is captured and brought to the Abstergo Foundation's facility in Madrid, Spain, where he may soon come to understand his place in the world, and control the power burning inside of him. Fassbender described Cal by saying "He doesn't have a lineage he can feel a belonging to ... he's a bit of a lost soul. He's always been drifting in and out of correctional facilities", and conversely described Aguilar as "very much somebody that belongs to the Creed. He has a cause, he's sort of been following that cause. He belongs to it."
  - Angus Brown as Young Cal
- Marion Cotillard as Dr. Sofia Rikkin:
  The daughter of Alan Rikkin and the leading scientist of the Animus project at Abstergo Foundation. Sofia is a brilliant scientist determined to use science to eradicate humanity's violent impulses and create a harmonious world. She might not see the dark underside of the modern-day Templars' causes, and her allegiance is yet to be tested. Cotillard described Sofia's relationship with her father as "twisted". Their relationship is distant, and she tries everything to "make him proud", she explains. "But at the same time, she starts to understand that they're not really on the same page. The most important thing for her is not to impress her father. It's to achieve what she started."
- Jeremy Irons as Alan Rikkin:
  The CEO of Abstergo Industries, one of the leaders of modern-day Templars, and the father of Sofia, whom he loves deeply, even if he often struggles to show it. He leads his own subsidiary organization, Abstergo Foundation, which is dedicated to the "perfection" of humankind. Determined to achieve the Templars' centuries-long goal to control all of humanity, Rikkin believes that through Cal and the ancestral memories he holds, he may finally achieve ultimate power for the betterment of humanity. Irons described the character as "a mover and a shaker. A shadowy figure. A man who is very much at the forefront of this world." Like Sofia, Rikkin believes in "removing the violent impulse all men carry", and sees an opportunity in Cal. "Rikkin believes the cause of unhappiness in the world is war, and if he can get rid of that then people like him will be safer and wealthier. He's not a very moral man, but he thinks he is." The character previously had a minor speaking role in the first Assassin's Creed game.
- Brendan Gleeson as Joseph Lynch:
  Cal's father and a member of the modern-day Assassin Brotherhood, also held prisoner at the Abstergo Foundation facility.
  - Brian Gleeson as Young Joseph.
- Charlotte Rampling as Ellen Kaye:
  A senior member of the Templar Elders, referred to as "Your Excellency", who is looking to re-purpose Abstergo's multibillion-dollar annual budget used for the Animus program.
- Michael K. Williams as Moussa:
  A captive of the Abstergo Foundation and a descendant of Baptiste, a Haitian Assassin active in 18th-century Louisiana who started his own voodoo cult allied with the Templars after feeling the Brotherhood had betrayed him; he was killed by the Assassin Aveline de Grandpré in 1766. When talking about the character, Williams said, "Moussa definitely has some assassin skills. Although I think he prefers to use trickery and magic and voodoo to slay his opponents as opposed to just hand-to-hand combat, but if it needed to be he could take it to the mat." Baptiste appears in Assassin's Creed III: Liberation.
- Denis Ménochet as McGowen:
  The head of Abstergo Foundation's security force.
- Essie Davis as Mary Lynch:
  Cal's mother, Joseph's wife, and a modern-day Assassin. She took her own life with her husband's assistance to prevent Abstergo from using her genetic memories to find the Apple of Eden. Her name is not said in the film, but is briefly shown on a genealogical board and is mentioned in the film's novelization.
- Ariane Labed as María:
  An Assassin active in 15th-century Spain and Aguilar's closest ally. More measured than her partner-in-arms, María is light on her feet and exceedingly quick, and together they are an unstoppable force. Like Aguilar, she understands the damage the Templar influence is doing to her country.
- Carlos Bardem as Benedicto:
  The Mentor of the Spanish Assassin Brotherhood in the late 15th century.
- Khalid Abdalla as Sultan Muhammad XII:
  The last Nasrid ruler of the Emirate of Granada whose defeat in the war against the Catholic Monarchs of Spain in 1492 marked the end of Islamic rule in the Iberian peninsula.
- Javier Gutiérrez as Tomás de Torquemada:
  Tomas de Torquemada ruled over the Spanish Inquisition for fifteen years, directing his inquisitors to root out and murder those he deemed to be manipulating the faith in their own pursuit of power. The most potent tool in his arsenal was the auto-da-fé: theatrical acts of public penance in which all those who crossed the Inquisition were burned alive. Torquemada previously appeared in Assassin's Creed II: Discovery where, unlike the film, he was not portrayed as a Templar.
- Hovik Keuchkerian as Ojeda:
  A Spanish Templar and Tomas de Torquemada's right-hand man. While Torquemada pulls the strings, Ojeda does the real work, exacting brutal punishment on any who dare to challenge the Inquisition. He thinks nothing of razing entire towns and commands a great army; however, his lack of subtlety is his weakness, because it allows the Assassins who operate in the shadows to keep their eyes on him at all times.
- Matias Varela as Emir:
  A captive of the Abstergo Foundation and a descendant of Yusuf Tazim, an Ottoman Assassin who led the Brotherhood in Constantinople until his death at the Templars' hands in 1512. Yusuf Tazim appears in Assassin's Creed: Revelations.
- Callum Turner as Nathan:
  A captive of the Abstergo Foundation and a descendant of Duncan Walpole, an English Assassin active during the Golden Age of Piracy, who defected to the Templars due to his dissatisfaction with the Brotherhood and was killed by the pirate Edward Kenway in 1715. Duncan Walpole appears in Assassin's Creed IV: Black Flag.
- Michelle H. Lin as Lin:
  A captive of the Abstergo Foundation and a descendant of Shao Jun, a Chinese Assassin who vanquished the Templars and rebuilt the Brotherhood in China in the early 16th-century. Shao Jun appears in Assassin's Creed: Embers and Assassin's Creed Chronicles: China.

== Production ==
=== Development ===
You know, we absolutely want to respect the game. There's so much cool stuff in the game that we're actually spoiled for choice in terms of what we can use and what we can't, but we also want to bring new elements to it and perhaps our own version of things that already exist in the game. But we're definitely making a feature film, and we're approaching it as a feature film, as opposed to approaching it as a video game. But I love the world ... When I met up with the guys from Ubisoft and they started to explain this whole world and the idea of D.N.A memory—you know, I think it's a very feasible scientific theory. I just thought, 'This is so rich,' and about the possibility of it being this cinematic experience. So I'm really excited about it, and we're working very hard to make sure that we've got the best and most exciting, original package.

— Michael Fassbender, star and producer of the film, on how much of the film would remain faithful to the game and how much would be an original story.

In October 2011, Sony Pictures was in final negotiations with Ubisoft Motion Pictures to make a film version of Assassin's Creed, to be released in 3D. In July 2012, Michael Fassbender was announced to star in the film, as well as co-produce, through his DMC Film banner, with Conor McCaughan. Jean-Julien Baronnet, CEO of Ubisoft Motion Pictures, said Fassbender was the studio's first choice to star in the film. By the time of Fassbender's hiring, negotiations between Sony Pictures and Ubisoft Motion Pictures were put on hold, with Ubisoft executives planning to develop the film independently to maintain greater creative control. Sony was able to still distribute the film, but Ubisoft Motion Pictures would not resume talks until packaging the project with a writer and director. In October 2012, Ubisoft revealed the film would be co-produced with New Regency and distributed by 20th Century Fox. New Regency financed part of the film's production, for Ubisoft to not shoulder much financial risk, yet still be able to be involved creatively; RatPac Entertainment and Alpha Pictures also co-financed the film.

In January 2013, Michael Lesslie was hired to write the film. In June 2013, Frank Marshall entered negotiations to produce the film. In July, Scott Frank revealed he was rewriting the script. In January 2014, a LinkedIn profile for executive producer Fannie Pailloux stated filming was scheduled to begin in August 2014. In April 2014, Adam Cooper and Bill Collage were hired to rewrite the script. By the end of April, Justin Kurzel was in talks to direct.

=== Pre-production ===
The film was originally projected to be the first of several films. On February 12, 2015, Ubisoft's CEO Yves Guillemot confirmed that New Regency had begun production on the film. The following day, it was announced that Marion Cotillard had joined the cast, following her work with Kurzel and Fassbender on Macbeth (2015). In April 2015, Fassbender revealed that filming was scheduled to begin in September 2015. In May 2015, Alicia Vikander was in talks to star in the film, though in the following month, she took a role in Jason Bourne instead, and Ariane Labed was cast in her place. Producers on the film include Baronnet, In July 2015, Michael K. Williams was added to the cast. Initially thought to be cast as recurring protagonist Desmond Miles, Ubisoft clarified in July 2012 that Fassbender would play a different character instead. In late August 2015, Fassbender's role was revealed as Callum Lynch in the present day and Aguilar in 15th-century Spain; filming locations for the film were also announced.

=== Filming ===
Principal photography on the film began on August 31, 2015, with filming taking place in Malta, London, Spain, and the 007 Stage at Pinewood Studios. Adam Arkapaw serves as cinematographer, while Andy Nicholson was production designer. In October 2015, Jeremy Irons and Brendan Gleeson joined the cast. In December 2015, shooting took place in Spain, and Irons' role was revealed to be Alan Rikkin. Principal filming ended on January 15, 2016, with further filming taking place in Ely Cathedral in July.

=== Music ===
The film's musical score is composed by Justin's brother Jed Kurzel and released through Verve Music Group on December 21, 2016.

== Connections to the video games ==
Aymar Azaïzia, head of Assassin's Creed content at Ubisoft, stated that the film, which is "a brand new story, [with] new characters set in our universe", had the possibility to feature "some familiar faces", and that the present day element would feature Abstergo. Fassbender said, "We really want to respect the game[s] and the elements to it. But we also wanted to come up with our own thing. And one thing I've sort of learned from doing the franchises like X-Men is that audiences, I think, want to be surprised and to see new elements of what they already know, and different takes on it." The Animus, the machine used to experience ancestors' memories, was redesigned for the film, from a chair, to a machine that lifts the user in the air, allowing for a more modern, interactive and dramatic experience. Fassbender also noted the change was made to avoid comparisons to The Matrix. The Abstergo compound in the film features an artifact room that holds an assortment of weapons from the games beyond the traditional Assassin wrist blades. Fassbender also stated that Ubisoft was "very keen" about elements being created for the film, and were considering incorporating them into future games.

The film also features the games' signature "Leap of Faith" jump, performed by Fassbender's stunt double, Damien Walters, rather than a digital double, as the production team wanted to make many of the elements in the film as "real" as possible, without the use of visual effects. The 125-foot (38 m) freefall was described as "one of the highest freefalls performed by a stuntman in almost 35 years".

== Release ==
Assassin's Creed was released on December 21, 2016. The film was originally announced in May 2013 to be released on May 22, 2015, a date that was pushed back the following month to June 26, 2015. In November 2013, the film was pushed back once again to a new release date of August 7, 2015. In September 2014, the film was pushed to an unspecified 2016 release date, which was later revealed to be December 21, 2016.

=== Home media ===
Assassin's Creed was released onto Blu-ray and DVD on March 21, 2017 and Digital HD from Amazon Video and iTunes on March 10, 2017.

== Reception ==
=== Box office ===
Assassin's Creed grossed $54.6 million in the United States and Canada and $186.3 million in other territories for a worldwide total of $240.9 million, against a production budget of $125 million. The Hollywood Reporter estimated the film lost New Regency $75–100 million, when factoring together all expenses and revenues.

In North America, Assassin's Creed opened alongside Sing and Passengers, and was initially expected to gross $25–35 million from 2,902 theaters over its first six days of release. However, after grossing $1.4 million from Tuesday night previews and $4.6 million on its first day, six-day projections were lowered to $22 million. It went on to gross $10.3 million in its opening weekend (a six-day total of $22.5 million), finishing fifth at the box office. It fell 15% in its second weekend to $8.7 million, finishing in eighth, and over 50% in its third week, grossing $4.2 million and finishing tenth.

=== Critical response ===
On Rotten Tomatoes, Assassin's Creed has an approval rating of 19% based on 226 reviews. The website's critical consensus reads, "Assassin's Creed is arguably better made (and certainly better cast) than most video game adaptations; unfortunately, the CGI-fueled end result is still a joylessly overplotted slog." On Metacritic, the film has a score of 36 out of 100 based on 38 critics, indicating "generally unfavorable" reviews. Audiences polled by CinemaScore gave the film an average grade of "B+" on an A+ to F scale.

Peter Bradshaw of The Guardian wrote, "I bet playing the game is much more exciting. But then getting Fassbender to slap a coat of Dulux on the wall of his hi-tech prison cell and monitoring the progressive moisture-loss would be more exciting." Robbie Collin of The Daily Telegraph was equally scathing, saying, "For everyone who thought Dan Brown's conspiracy novels were just lacking a spot of parkour, Assassin's Creed might be your favourite film of the year. But for the clinically sane 99.9 percent of the rest of us, it's rather less exciting."

David Ehrlich of IndieWire gave the film a B−, and said "declaring this to be the best video game movie ever made is the kind of backhanded compliment that sounds like hyperbole, but the description fits the bill on both counts".

== Cancelled sequels ==
In 2016, Daphne Yang, CEO of the film's Taiwanese co-financier CatchPlay, stated that 20th Century Fox and New Regency was looking to turn the film into a franchise, since it is based on "successful Ubisoft games and would make ideal sequels". Two additional films were planned, with the first sequel having entered development during the production of the first film. Kurzel said that he would like to explore the Cold War in the sequel. Due to the film's negative reception, and in the wake of the acquisition of 21st Century Fox's assets by Disney, the sequels, together with other film adaptations of video games, were cancelled.

== See also ==
- List of films based on video games
