= Assassin's Creed Nexus VR =

Virtual reality adventure game

- Developer: Red Storm Entertainment (Note: Ubisoft Düsseldorf, Ubisoft Reflections, Ubisoft Mumbai, Ubisoft Pune, Ubisoft Montreal, Ubisoft Belgrade and Ubisoft Berlin provided additional development.)
- Publisher: Ubisoft
- Composer: Chris Tilton
- Series: Assassin's Creed
- Platforms: Meta Quest 2; Meta Quest Pro; Meta Quest 3
- Release: November 16, 2023
- Genre: Action-adventure
- Mode: Single-player

Assassin's Creed Nexus VR is a virtual reality action-adventure game developed by Red Storm Entertainment and published by Ubisoft for virtual reality (VR) headsets Meta Quest 2, Meta Quest Pro, and Meta Quest 3. Played from a first-person perspective, the game stars Ezio Auditore da Firenze, Connor, and Kassandra as its protagonists. It is the first VR game in the Assassin's Creed series and was released on November 16, 2023.

== Plot ==
An unnamed hacker is hired by the Assassins Rebecca Crane and Shaun Hastings to infiltrate an Abstergo project called "Nexus Eye". The project, led by Dominika Wilk, has the goal of retrieving the code of fragments of an Isu machine and combining it with the Animus to create a computer capable of predicting and influencing human behavior. The hacker is instructed by Dominika to relive the memories of Ezio Auditore, Kassandra, and Connor to find the fragments, but secretly plants logic bombs across the memories to destroy them and prevent Abstergo from obtaining the fragments.

In 1509, Ezio travels to Venice to reclaim his stolen sword. Successful, he returns to Monteriggioni, where his sister Claudia is overseeing renovations following the siege that occurred there almost a decade prior. (Note: As depicted in Assassin's Creed: Brotherhood) However, the town is attacked by bandits led by a woman named Seraphina, who steal Ezio's belongings. Ezio pursues Seraphina through Monteriggioni's underground tunnels, but she escapes to Venice. Following her trail, Ezio seeks help from his friend Antonio de Magianis, who points him to Francesco Rizzo, a merchant involved with the attack. Ezio carries out a series of humiliations to lure out and kill Rizzo, whom he discovers to be a Templar. Afterwards, he reunites with Leonardo da Vinci and together they deduce that Seraphina, revealed to be a member of the Cult of Hermes, is after the Staff of Hermes Trismegistus. Ezio travels to the temple where the Staff is located and confronts Seraphina, who tries to use the artifact on him, but it is a fake. (Note: The real Staff is in the possession of Kassandra at this time, as established in Assassin's Creed Odyssey.) Ezio ultimately kills Seraphina and reclaims his stolen belongings.

In 405 BC, Kassandra travels to Delos to aid the Spartan army by assassinating two Athenian commanders. Afterwards, she meets with her friend Odessa, who asks her to find the bow of Odysseus, Odessa's ancestor. Kassandra retrieves the bow, but Odessa lets her keep it. Six months later, Kassandra travels to Athens after Sparta has occupied the city and installed an oligarchy known as the Thirty Tyrants. Their leader, Critias, tasks Kassandra to eliminate a group of thieves, before asking her to assassinate his fellow statesman Theramenes for his own political gain. She refuses and is branded an enemy of Athens, while Critias has Theramenes killed via poison. Kassandra meets with Theramenes' adjutant Nikomedes, who points her to "The Viper", Critias' informant. Kassandra infiltrates the Viper's party and assassinates her before fleeing Athens with Nikomedes. After assembling an army, Kassandra and Nikomedes return to liberate the city, and the former personally slays Critias.

In 1775, Connor rescues Zadock Perry, a Son of Liberty who was imprisoned in Boston and is awaiting execution. He then meets with his mentor Achilles Davenport, who instructs him to find some encrypted letters written by Jonathan Ferguson and assassinate Aidan Galway, who betrayed both Perry and Ferguson, as well as Major Rawle, who is planning to execute Ferguson. One year later, during the Siege of Boston, Achilles tasks Connor with eliminating a Templar cell posing as Patriots. Connor finds Ferguson, who helps him identify the Templars, allowing Connor to assassinate them. In 1777, Connor relocates to Newport, Rhode Island, where William Barton asks him to find a spymaster named Jeremiah Scudder, who has British general Richard Prescott's schedule that they can use to kidnap him. After carrying out a few favors for Scudder, Connor obtains Prescott's location and assists Barton with kidnapping him. In the basement, Connor meets Lawrence Cato, a former Assassin who reveals Scudder to be a Templar agent, prompting Connor to track him down and eliminate him.

After completing Ezio's memories, Dominika outs the hacker as a spy, but Rebecca and Shaun rescue them. The hacker then explores the last of Kassandra's and Connor's memories while hidden from Dominika, before searching for the final fragment in a corrupted memory, where they are pursued by Dominika's Hunters. After planting the last logic bomb, the hacker detonates all the bombs, destroying the memories and putting an end to the Nexus Eye. However, the Assassins' victory is short-lived as Dominika soon tracks down the hacker. She gloats that the Templars will succeed in the end, before an Abstergo team dispatched by her breaks in and captures the hacker.

== Development ==
Red Storm Entertainment led the game's development, with Ubisoft Reflections and Ubisoft's offices in Düsseldorf, Mumbai, Pune, Montreal, Belgrade and Berlin providing assistance.

In September 2020, at the digital event of Facebook Connect, Red Storm Entertainment's VP of Product Development, Elizabeth Loverso, revealed several AAA game franchises coming to virtual reality format to the public. Two of the projects announced were an untitled Assassin's Creed game and an untitled installment from the Tom Clancy's Splinter Cell series (also developed by Ubisoft), with both titles set to release exclusively for Oculus platforms. In June 2023, at a Meta Quest Gaming Showcase event, the updated title for the game, Assassin's Creed Nexus VR, was announced along with a release window of late 2023.

== Reception ==
Assassin's Creed Nexus VR

Aggregate score
Aggregator	Score
Metacritic	78/100

Review score
Publication	Score
IGN	7/10

Assassin's Creed Nexus VR received "generally favorable" reviews according to review aggregator Metacritic. IGN gave Nexus VR a 7/10, commenting that it "is an impressively complete Ubisoft game, even if not all those parts stick the landing in VR." Matt Kamen from Wired wrote that the game was "full of passion and dedication, not only to creating an experience that can be delivered in virtual reality, but one that feels authentic, essential even, for Assassin's Creed fans"

According to Ubisoft's CEO, Yves Guillemot, Nexus VR had disappointing sales, which resulted in Ubisoft not increasing its investment in VR.

=== Awards and nominations ===
Year	Ceremony	Category	Result	Ref.
2024	13th New York Game Awards	Coney Island Dreamland Award for Best AR/VR Game	Nominated	
2024	27th Annual D.I.C.E. Awards	Immersive Reality Game of the Year	Nominated	
2024	27th Annual D.I.C.E. Awards	Immersive Reality Technical Achievement	Nominated	
2024	16th Unity Awards	Best AR/VR Game	Won	
