= Connor (Assassin's Creed) =

Assassin's Creed character

- Assassin's Creed character
- Connor in Assassin's Creed III
- First game: Assassin's Creed III (2012)
- Created by: Ubisoft Montreal
- Portrayed by: Noah Watts; Jamie Mayers (young)

In-universe information
- Full name: Ratonhnhaké꞉ton
- Family: Haytham Kenway (father); Kaniehtí:io (mother)
- Spouse: Unnamed wife
- Children: Io:nhiòte (daughter); Unnamed daughter Unnamed son
- Relatives: Edward Kenway (grandfather); Tessa Kenway (grandmother); Jennifer Scott (half-aunt); Bernard Kenway (great-grandfather); Linette Kenway (great-grandmother); William Miles (descendant); Desmond Miles (descendant); Elijah (descendant); Victor Flores Castillo (descendant); Noa Kim (descendant)
- Origin: Kanatahséton, Mohawk Valley, British America
- Nationality: Iroquois-British

Ratonhnhaké:ton (Mohawk pronunciation: [radũnhaɡɛ̌ːdõ]), commonly known by his adopted name Connor, (Note: Despite several media outlets and subsequent games in the series referring to Connor as Connor Kenway due to his consanguinity with Haytham Kenway, the character never identifies himself as such in Assassin's Creed III.) is a fictional character in the video game series Assassin's Creed. A half-British, half-Mohawk Master Assassin who serves as a central character in the games set around the American Revolution, he first appears as the main protagonist of Assassin's Creed III (2012), in which he is portrayed by Native American actor Noah Watts through performance capture, and voiced by Jamie Mayers as a young child. He also makes a minor appearance in the tie-in game Assassin's Creed III: Liberation. The character has made further appearances in various spin-off media of the franchise.

Within the series' alternate historical setting, Ratonhnhaké:ton was born in 1756 as the illegitimate son of Haytham Kenway, a British nobleman and the leader of the North American colonial rite of the Templar Order, following his short-lived relationship with Kaniehtí:io, a Kanien’kehá:ka woman from the village of Kanatahséton. After witnessing his mother's death in an attack on their tribe in his youth, Ratonhnhaké:ton vows revenge on the Templars, whom he holds responsible, and eventually joins their rival organization, the Assassin Brotherhood (inspired by the real-life Order of Assassins), which was nearly exterminated by the Templars years prior. The Colonial Brotherhood's sole surviving member, Achilles Davenport, reluctantly trains Ratonhnhaké:ton and gives him the name "Connor"—the name of Achilles' deceased son—to help him blend in with colonial society. Spending years to fight the Templars and rebuild the Colonial Brotherhood, Connor becomes a central figure in the American Revolution as he helps the Patriot cause with the goal of protecting his people's lands from incursions and preventing the Templars from taking control of the young United States.

The character has received a mixed critical reception, drawing unfavorable comparisons to his father Haytham and previous series protagonists. While many reviewers found Connor to be a bland and unlikeable character due to his hotheaded nature and perceived lack of growth throughout Assassin's Creed III's narrative, more positive commentary focused on his nuanced characterization and on his distinct status as an Indigenous protagonist in the video game industry.

== Creation and development ==
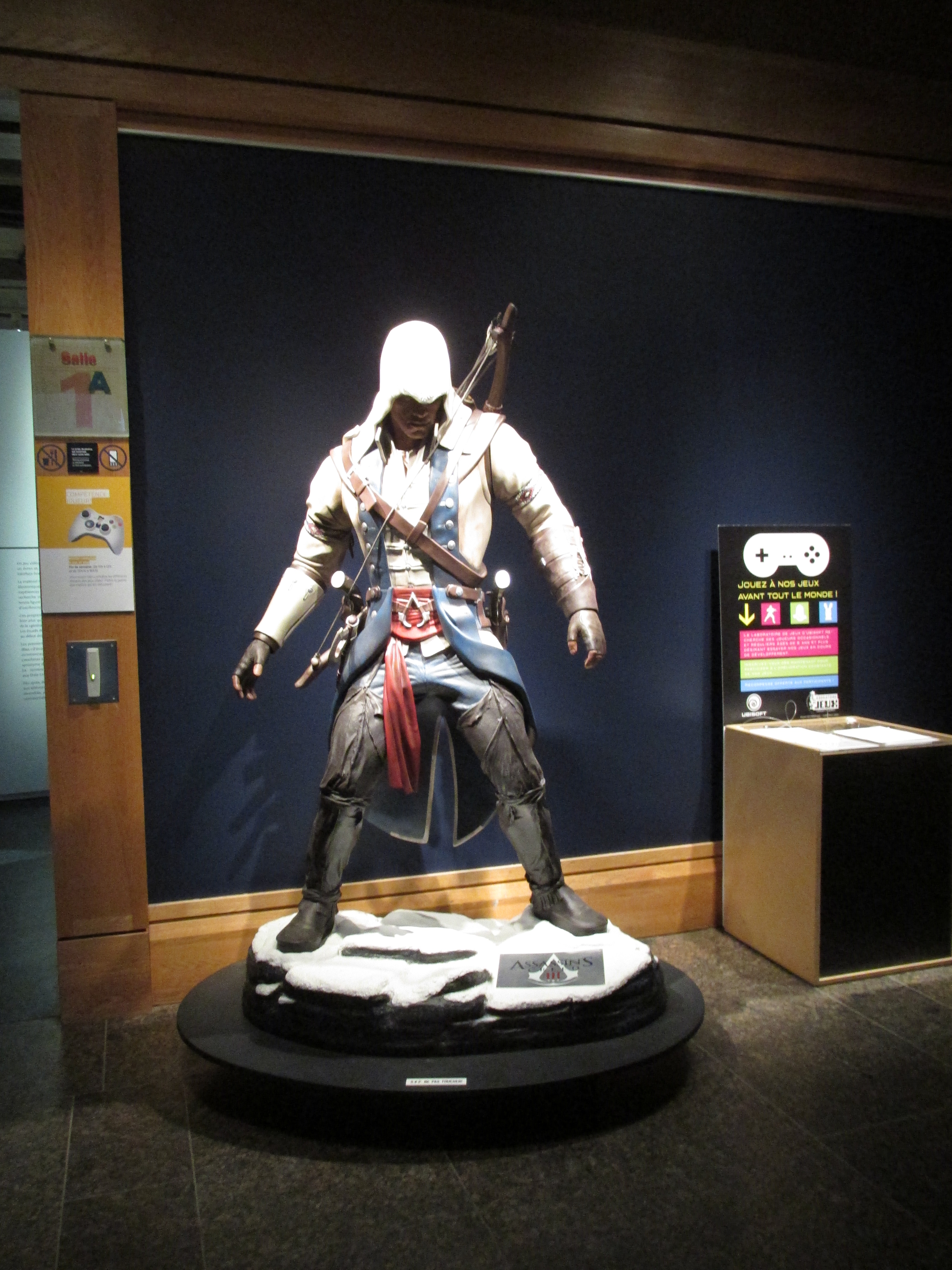
Life-sized statue of Connor at the Musée de la civilisation in Quebec City, Canada.

Connor was conceptualized as an individual with mixed Mohawk heritage to fill the role of an outsider for Assassin's Creed III's American Revolution setting. In developing Connor and the other Mohawk characters of the game, the team worked with the Kahnawà:ke Mohawk community near Montreal, contacting some of the residents to help translate Mohawk dialogue, and hired a Mohawk cultural consultant from the Kanien’kehá:ka Onkwawén:na Raotitióhkwa Language and Cultural Center, who ensured the characters were authentic and the team avoided stereotypes. Despite the extensive research they conducted into Mohawk culture and language, the team did not want Connor to be defined solely by his heritage. Alex Hutchison, the creative director of Assassin's Creed III, said in a 2012 interview, "I think that's what attracted a lot of the groups to work with us. We had this idea that we're just going to have a character, he's a real character, he's part of a 30-hour story, and you follow his whole life–and he's also Native American [...] It's not a cardboard cutout." Ubisoft worked with two key members of the Kanien'kehá:ka when developing Connor's character: Akwiratékha Martin, the Kanien'kéha language teacher, and Teiowí:sonte Thomas Deer, the Mohawk cultural liaison.

=== Portrayal ===
Connor is voiced by Noah Watts, who also physically portrayed the character in a motion capture studio. Watts originally got a call from his agent about an unnamed film set during the American Revolution and, eager to star in a period-piece film, went to the audition, unaware it was actually for Assassin's Creed III. He began his work with Ubisoft for the title in January 2012. Despite his Native American heritage, Watts is not a fluent speaker of the Mohawk language as he is a member of the Blackfeet Nation, and required a language consultant to help him get Connor's lines in Mohawk correct. Watts, a fan of the Assassin's Creed series, enjoyed his time voice acting and performance capturing for the game, and appreciated the opportunity to portray a Native character in such a public platform.

Watts explained that he based his portrayal of Connor on Cherokee actor Wes Studi's work in the 1992 film The Last of the Mohicans, particularly his matter-of-fact delivery style. He also chose to emphasize that English is the character's second language by purposefully not using contractions early on in the story and by implementing them towards the end of the game to signify how Connor's vocabulary has improved and developed over time.

== Appearances ==
=== Assassin's Creed III ===
Connor is an ancestor (on the paternal side) of Desmond Miles, the protagonist of most of the early series' modern-day sequences, who experiences Connor's life through the Animus, a device unlocking hidden memories inside his DNA. As shown in Assassin's Creed III, Connor was born as Ratonhnhaké:ton in 1756 to Kaniehtí:io, a Kanien’kehá:ka woman from the village of Kanatahséton, following her brief relationship with Haytham Kenway, the Grand Master of the Colonial Rite of the Templar Order. In 1760, Ratonhnhaké:ton witnesses his mother die in an attack on their village, which he assumes was perpetrated by the Templar Charles Lee, whom he encountered shortly before. Years later, a teenage Ratonhnhaké:ton is given a Crystal Ball by the village elder, which allows Juno, a member of the First Civilization, to communicate with him. Juno claims that Ratonhnhaké:ton must join the Assassins to save his village from destruction, and directs him to the homestead of Achilles Davenport, the retired Mentor of the Colonial Brotherhood. Achilles, disillusioned with the Assassin cause following his Brotherhood's collapse, reluctantly trains Ratonhnhaké:ton and renames him Connor (after his late son, Connor Davenport) to help him blend in with colonial society.

Learning the Templars are trying to influence the American Revolution's outcome, Connor sets out to stop them. In the process, he becomes involved in the American Revolutionary War, aiding the Patriots in the hopes that they will in turn protect his people's lands. During this time, he also slowly rebuilds the Colonial Brotherhood by recruiting new Assassin initiates; turns Achilles' homestead into a small community by persuading a number of settlers affected by the war to move there; and renovates a decommissioned Assassin brig, the Aquila, becoming its captain.

Eventually, Connor runs into his father Haytham while they are both hunting a rogue Templar, Benjamin Church, and the two form an uneasy alliance. As he spends time with his father, Connor comes to understand that the Assassins' and the Templars' goals are not so different and considers the possibility of uniting the two orders. However, Connor's trust in Haytham is shattered when the latter reveals that George Washington was responsible for Kaniehtí:io's death in a thinly veiled attempt to turn him against Washington. Angrily cutting ties with both Haytham and Washington, Connor returns to his village, only to learn that his people have been manipulated by Charles Lee into siding with the Loyalists.

While planning to assassinate Lee, Connor is confronted by Haytham and is ultimately forced to kill his father. During this time, Achilles passes away, leaving Connor to succeed him as leader of the Colonial Assassins. In 1782, Connor kills Lee and retrieves an amulet from him, which he later buries per Juno's instructions. Upon finding his village abandoned, Connor learns that the land has been sold by the newly-formed United States government to cover its war debts, and realizes that he failed to protect his people. Connor concludes his journey by agreeing with Haytham that the world can be selfish and cruel; however, he refuses to renounce his fight for a better future, believing that things can improve, even if not during his lifetime.

In The Tyranny of King Washington expansion, set after the events of the base game, George Washington visits Connor to discuss an Apple of Eden he has acquired, which has been giving him nightmares of an alternate timeline where he rules the United States as a tyrant king. Connor is transported into this reality after touching the Apple, discovering that in this timeline his mother was not killed in his youth and, as a result, he never became an Assassin. Connor subsequently joins a rebellion against King Washington's regime and, despite losing most of his allies along the way, he is ultimately able to defeat Washington and take possession of his Apple, which transports him back to his original timeline. There, a terrified Washington asks Connor to dispose of the Apple, which he proceeds to do, tossing it into the ocean.

=== Other appearances ===
Connor makes a minor appearance in the spin-off game Assassin's Creed III: Liberation, set during the events of Assassin's Creed III. By linking the two games, players can unlock an exclusive mission in Liberation featuring him; this mission is included in the subsequent re-releases of Liberation. He also has a minor, voice-only role in the Aveline expansion pack for the 2013 title Assassin's Creed IV: Black Flag. In the modern-day sections of Black Flag, a market analysis for Abstergo Entertainment, the fictional video games subsidiary of Abstergo Industries, can be found via hacking computers. The market analysis reveals that Abstergo was looking into the possibility of using Connor as the protagonist of a future project, but ultimately decided against it due to finding him too stoic and thinking that most audiences would not be interested in learning about Mohawk culture. Despite this, in Assassin's Creed Unity, Abstergo has produced a fictional video game starring Connor, titled Washington and the Wolf, which can be seen at the start.

Like other protagonists of the series, Connor's outfit has been featured as an unlockable cosmetic option in several subsequent releases. In 2022, he was added as a playable character to the free-to-play role-playing mobile game Assassin's Creed Rebellion. Connor is also featured as one of the three playable characters of the 2023 virtual reality game Assassin's Creed Nexus VR. His story arc is set in 1776, during the events of Asasssin's Creed III, and follows Connor as he is contacted by Achilles Davenport to rescue an imprisoned Son of Liberty in Boston.

In literature, Connor has appeared as the narrator of the novel Assassin's Creed: Forsaken, where he recovers and reads through his father's journal sometime after the latter's death. Upon learning of Haytham's tragic life and the fact that he genuinely loved his son in his own way, he realizes he misjudged his father and regrets not being able to reconcile with him. In 2017, Connor was featured in the fourth and final issue of the Assassin's Creed: Reflections comic book miniseries, where it is revealed that, sometime following the events of Assassin's Creed III, he married a woman from another tribe and had three children, including a daughter named Io:nhiòte, who inherited his rare ability of Eagle Vision.

== Reception ==
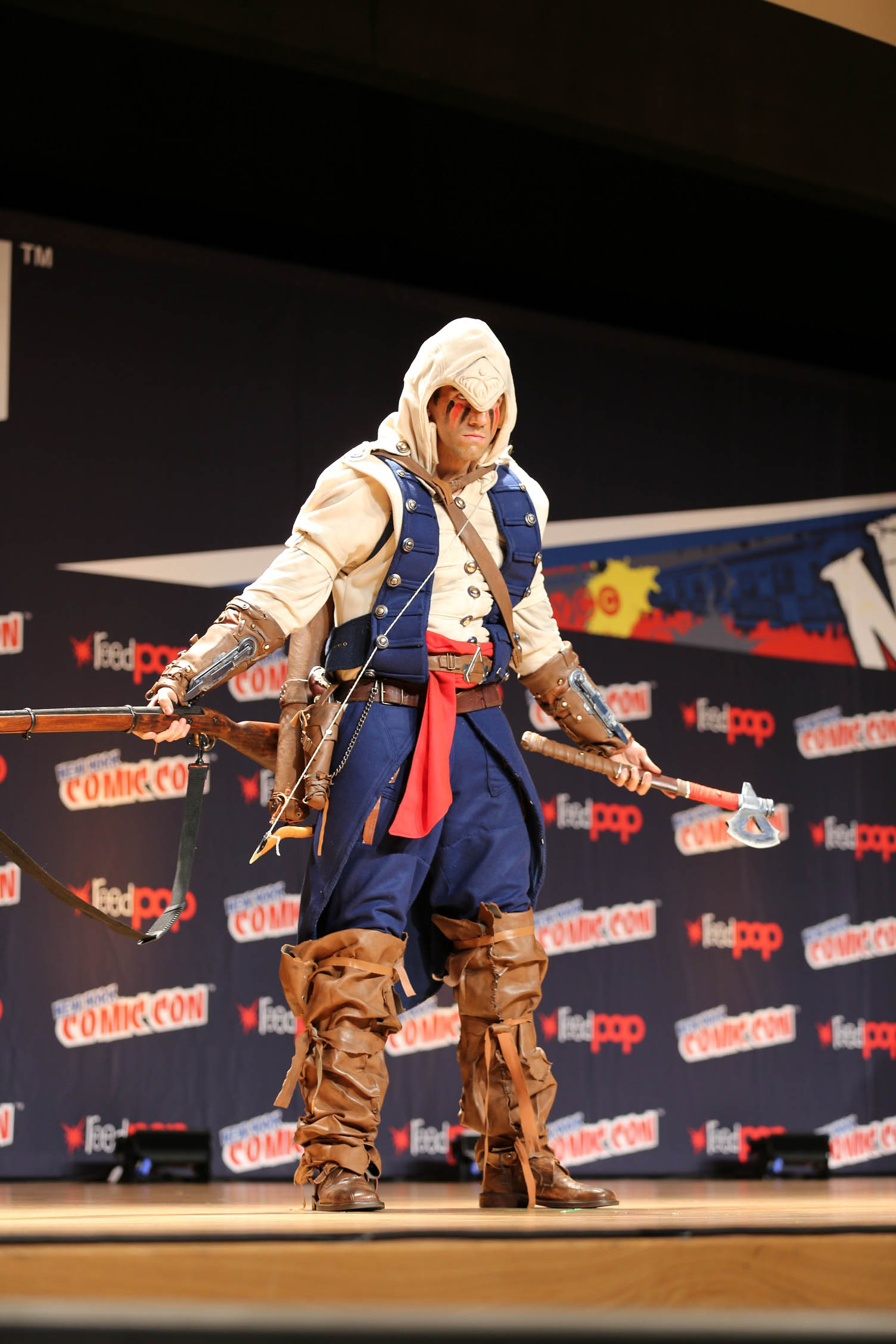
Connor cosplay at New York Comic Con 2014.

Connor received a mixed critical reception, being often contrasted with his well-received father, Haytham, who is playable in the early chapters of Assassin's Creed III, as well as the previous protagonists in the series, Altaïr Ibn-LaʼAhad and Ezio Auditore da Firenze, the latter of whom in particular was critically acclaimed. In a contemporary review of Assassin's Creed III for PSM3, Joel Gregory was disappointed by Connor's character arc, saying that although his skills develop over the course of the main storyline, his personality does not. He also called Connor "relentlessly strait-laced and humourless", and "duller than Altair and a world away from Ezio."

Connor has placed low on numerous Assassin's Creed character rankings. In a 2021 list by PC Gamer, he came out last, with the reviewer calling Connor a boring protagonist who "sulks, pouts, and complains his way through what is also the worst Assassin's Creed game." On the same list, Haytham placed fourth due to being a more complex and fun character to play as than Connor. German outlet GamePro ranked Connor as the franchise's 13th-greatest protagonist, criticizing his lack of development and blind devotion to the Assassin Order, but acknowledging that he is a more nuanced character than most people give him credit for, and that he might rank higher if he was given a sequel to flesh out his character. In a list by CBR ranking the Assassin's Creed protagonists by likability, Connor finished second to last due to his hotheaded and violent nature.

However, not all reception of the character was negative. In his review of Assassin's Creed III, PC Gamer's Chris Thursten said that Connor's characterisation is strong, and that he "will get some flak simply for not being Ezio, but he comes into his own in the second half of the game." In a 2020 ranking of the franchise's Assassins by TheGamer, Connor finished fifth for holding onto his convictions and desire for justice even when they put him into conflict with his allies.

Connor was nominated for "Character of the Year" at the 2012 Spike Video Game Awards, and Best Character Design at the 4th Inside Gaming Awards in 2012.

Being a Native American protagonist, Connor has elicited various reactions from the community. In developing Assassin's Creed III, the team had sought to make the character as historically accurate as possible, enlisting the help of Indigenous consultants. The in-game depiction of Mohawk culture, beliefs, and language, as well as Connor's relation with his Mohawk heritage, was generally praised. Alex Hutchison, the creative director of Assassin's Creed III, wanted to steer clear of the stereotypical and cliché depiction of non-white characters, so the team focused on making Connor a deeper character, not defined solely by his Native heritage. Native Americans were generally happy with Connor's depiction and the decision to feature a Native character as the protagonist of a Triple-A video game. Although some bashed Connor's character for fitting the "noble savage" stereotype, his portrayal was still praised, with some noting that Connor's Native heritage is the only good thing he has left in the game and that his personal experiences justify his angry and brutal personality. While certain stereotypes were embedded in the character of Connor, Ubisoft was nonetheless praised for not whitewashing his story, even as the game focuses on colonialism and features primarily white characters. Although Connor plays the role of the archetypal white Western hero, there is a stark contrast between this role and his portrayal in the game, as Ubisoft used Connor's heritage to bring Native Americans and their stories to the foreground of Assassin's Creed III's narrative while avoiding the stereotypical Hollywood illustration of a Native American character.

In a 2022 retrospective on Indigenous representation in video games, Comic Book Resources highlighted Assassin's Creed III and the character of Connor as a "valiant effort," and praised Ubisoft's decision to work with Mohawk consultants in order to portray and explore Native American culture, beliefs and language respectfully.
