= Skins (2002 film) =

- Directed by: Chris Eyre
- Written by: Adrian C. Louis; Jennifer D. Lyne
- Based on: Skins by Adrian C. Louis
- Produced by: Brenda J. Chambers; Chris Cooney; Jeff Cooney; Chris Eyre; Jon Kilik; Jennifer D. Lyne; Eugene Mazzola; David Pomier; Larry T. Pourier
- Starring: Eric Schweig; Graham Greene; Gary Farmer; Noah Watts; Michael Spears; Lois Red Elk; Michelle Thrush; Misty Upham
- Cinematography: Stephen Kazmierski
- Edited by: Paul Trejo
- Music by: BC Smith
- Production companies: Starz Encore Entertainment; Grandview Pictures; Aboriginal Peoples Television Network
- Distributed by: First Look Pictures
- Release date: 2002
- Running time: 87 minutes
- Box office: $249,204

Skins is a 2002 American feature film by Chris Eyre and based upon the novel of the same name by Adrian C. Louis. It was filmed on South Dakota's Pine Ridge Indian Reservation (renamed the fictional Beaver Creek Indian Reservation in the film), which served as the setting in the novel. Lakota Sioux tribal police officer Rudy Yellow Lodge (Eric Schweig) struggles to rescue his older, alcoholic brother, Mogie (Graham Greene), a former football star who was wounded in combat three times in Vietnam. Winona LaDuke makes a cameo appearance as Rose Two Buffalo.

== Plot ==
Rudy and Mogie Yellow Lodge are Lakota Sioux brothers on the Pine Ridge Indian Reservation in South Dakota. Mogie is unemployed and has a teenage son. Rudy, a police officer, struggles to care for his brother, nephew and the rest of the town through the hands of the law. Mogie resists Rudy's helpful attempts, preferring to drink and joke about the depressed state of their people and town. As a child, Rudy had been bitten by a spider, and Mogie told him it was Iktomi, the trickster spider; this spider re-appears to Rudy early in the film and Rudy's attempts to help begin to wander outside the lines of the law.

When Rudy is sent on a police call to an abandoned house, he finds the bloodied, dead body of a young man who has been kicked to death. Rudy sees someone in the darkness, but the stranger escapes and Rudy trips and falls onto a rock before he can identify his quarry.

Rudy's friend tells him that rocks are very spiritual and Rudy begins to worry that something has gotten into him, turning him vigilante. He sees a teenage boy wearing the same shoes as the figure who ran away from the scene of the murder, and follows him. Rudy overhears the boy talk with a friend about disposing a pair of boots that connects them to the murder. Disguising himself with black paint on his face, Rudy sneaks up on the boys with a baseball bat and viciously beats their kneecaps, announcing himself as the ghost of the boy they murdered. While washing the paint off his face, he again sees Iktomi.

Angered by a news report about a liquor store in the bordering town profiting off of alcoholic Native Americans, Rudy sets out - again with a painted face - and sets the store on fire. Unknown to Rudy, Mogie was on the roof of the building trying to steal some alcohol. Mogie escapes and survives, but is burned and severely scarred. Shocked, Rudy visits a friend to get instructions on how to deal with Iktomi's spirit; a combination of home remedies and a sweat lodge ceremony.

During Mogie's stay in the hospital, the doctors discover that he is dying, because of his failing liver. After he is released from the hospital, Mogie, his son Herbie, Rudy, and Aunt Helen have dinner, and Mogie brings up American Horse, an Oglala Indian who testified against the 7th Cavalry. This conversation brings up the story of the Wounded Knee Massacre, which Rudy tells to Herbie.

Rudy tells Mogie that he started the fire, and Mogie replies that the one thing he can do to make up for it is blow the nose off of George Washington's face on Mount Rushmore. Rudy calls the idea crazy, and refuses.

Responding to a police call of a man stuck in a trap, Rudy arrives outside a house to find that the victim, now dead, is Mogie's drinking partner. The owners of the house seems to have no remorse for the man's death. When Mogie finds out the story behind his friend's death, he goes to the family's house with a gun, but is dissuaded from using it when a child appears in the room.

Mogie dies of pneumonia shortly after his son's 18th birthday. A letter Mogie wrote before his death asks Rudy to care for his son. Rudy finds out that the liquor store is being rebuilt, and will now be twice as big and have two drive-in windows. He buys a large can of oil-based red paint and drives to Mount Rushmore. He climbs to the top, and standing on the head of George Washington, he ponders whether his plan is stupid, he once again sees Iktomi crawling across the paint can. Seeing this, he makes his tribute to Mogie by throwing the can of paint so that it drips down the side of George Washington's nose, almost like a rivulet of bloody tears. On the drive back, he sees a hitchhiker that looks like Mogie in his youth and laughs.

== Cast ==
- Eric Schweig as Rudy Yellow Lodge
- Graham Greene as Mogie Yellow Lodge
- Gary Farmer as Verdell Weasel Tail
- Noah Watts as Herbie Yellow Lodge
- Lois Red Elk as Aunt Helen
- Michelle Thrush as Stella
- Gil Birmingham as Sonny Yellow Lodge
- Elaine Miles as Rondella Roubaix
- Michael Spears as Teddy Yellow Lodge
- Misty Upham as Mrs. Blue Cloud
- Tina Keeper as Dr. Fitzgerald
- Delanna Studi as Francine

== Cultural background ==
The Lakota originated from the Great Lakes region where they were called Dakota. After they were pushed west by the Ojibwe People (Chippewa), they became a fixture of the Plains. Following the enormous herds of buffalo for the subsistence, the Lakota were nomadic in nature. Today there are about 70,000 Lakota, 20,500 of whom speak the Lakota language.

Mogie and Rudy are Oglala Lakota as most residents of the Pine Ridge Reservation identify. Pine Ridge, the reservation where Skins takes place is the largest reservation in South Dakota but the poorest reservation in all of the United States, with unemployment at around 80% and 49% of its approximate 28,000 live below the poverty line. These statistics have increased from 2002 when the movie was filmed.

The harsh living condition and high rates of alcoholism and violence of this particular reservation is very apparent in the film. Mogie's door is falling off of the hinges and every one of Rudy's police calls involves either intoxication or violence or both. Unfortunately, the fictional film is a very realistic depiction of life on the Pine Ridge Reservation.

Pine Ridge was originally part of the Great Sioux Reservation established by the Fort Laramie Treaty in 1868, but after several wars, including the Black Hills War, the reservation was divided into seven reservations, one being Pine Ridge. The Black Hills were very sacred to the Lakota and the conflict between them and the United States originally started because the Lakota did not want mining to happen in the Black Hills, but the U.S. persisted when gold was found there. The Black Hills are mentioned in Skins when Rudy's friend is telling him how sacred rocks are ("like the Black Hills"). On December 29, 1890, while the U.S. 7th Cavalry was moving the Oglala to Pine Ridge, 300 Oglala were murdered and 25 members of the U.S. 7th Cavalry were killed during what has now been named the Wounded Knee Massacre.

Mogie and Rudy tell the story of Wounded Knee over dinner with Herbie and Aunt Helen. “At that time, all Indian religious ceremonies were banned because [white soldiers] were afraid of them” Rudy tells Herbie. It is obvious through Mogie's anger during the story that the injustice of the Wounded Knee Massacre still haunts him. Through the rest of the film, Mogie's satirical humor makes it clear that the white man's power still looms over Pine Ridge through the faces of Mount Rushmore that ironically watch over the reservation, and that he hasn't forgotten the past.

In more recent history, 1973 was the year that the American Indian Movement (AIM) led the Wounded Knee Incident, resulting in a 71-day stand-off. On February 27, 1973, AIM members and a handful of Pine Ridge residents seized the town of Wounded Knee to bring to light numerous murders, crimes and charges of corruption committed by the Pine Ridge Tribal Council and the chairman, Richard A. "Dick" Wilson. As a result, FBI agents, the U.S. Marshall's Service, and the National Guard on the other side blockaded all entrances and exits leading to and from Wounded Knee.

After Wounded Knee 1973, the persecution, illegal arrests, prosecutorial misconduct and numerous as-yet-unsolved murders continued against various members of AIM and several residents of Pine Ridge. No action was taken by the federal government, not even a cursory investigation, against Dick Wilson. Wounded Knee 1973 was the culmination of the violence that swarmed the rest of the decade at Pine Ridge, naming it the “murder capitol of the United States” with up to 170 murders to every 100,000 people in 1976. While no reservation in Canada or the United States is without cases of extreme violence, poverty, substance abuse, and hopelessness, Pine Ridge stands alone in the misery index.

== Themes ==
=== Alcoholism ===
Alcoholism is depicted in the film in numerous ways, and as such is an exploration on the topic of alcoholism present within Native American culture. On the Pine Ridge Reservation alcoholism is nine times the national average, and life expectancy is nearly half of that in the rest of the country. The liquor-selling border town portrayed in the movie is representative of the town of Whiteclay, Nebraska, also known as "little skid row on the prairie". Mogie suffers from alcoholism, as many on the reservation do, and is diagnosed with a terminal liver condition as an effect of his drinking. Skins explores the tragedy and depth of despair caused by alcohol amongst indigenous peoples of North America, and brings the issue to the forefront in its almost brutal depictions of the disease. The lineage of alcoholism is also explored when it is revealed in flashbacks that both Rudy and Mogie were abused by their father, an alcoholic in his own right.

=== Western expansion and massacre ===
The theme of western expansion and the devastating effect this had on Native Americans is most prevalent within the setting of the film. The Pine Ridge Reservation is in the shadow of Mount Rushmore, a gigantic monolith of American expansion and the desecration of sacred tribal grounds. America's founding fathers were carved into a mountain sacred to the Sioux, highlighting the lack of respect by Euro-American cultures for Native Americans. This theme becomes especially prevalent in the final scene, which takes place with Mount Rushmore hovering ominously in the background.

Another aspect of western expansion explored in the film is the fact that the location of the Wounded Knee Massacre is located on the Pine Ridge Reservation. The mention of the massacre and the honoring of the members of the 7th Cavalry with Congressional Medals of Honor is a not so subtle dig at the suffering Native Americans experienced at the hands of Euro-Americans during their western expansion.

=== Justice for Native Americans ===
Another theme explored is that of the white justice for indigenous Americans. The policies of the American government towards indigenous peoples are explored via Rudy becoming a vigilante and pursuing his own idea of justice. The anger that Rudy feels towards businesses selling liquor when welfare checks are released, by taking advantage of the alcoholism present on the reservation leads to him burning down one of these businesses.

== Critical reception ==
On Rotten Tomatoes, Skins has an approval rating of 59% based on 58 critics' reviews. The site's critics consensus reads, "Though at times melodramatic, Skins’ harsh depiction of life on the reservation is an eye-opener." Metacritic has an aggregate score for the film of 57 out of 100 based on 19 reviews.

Roger Ebert gave the film three out of four stars, citing, "To see this movie is to understand why the faces on Mount Rushmore are so painful and galling to the first Americans. The movie's final scene is haunting." Mark Holcomb of The Village Voice was more critical: "Like his popular 1998 debut, Smoke Signals, Chris Eyre's follow-up, Skins, is a humorless slice of family melodrama that functions as cut-rate ethnography."

== Awards ==
- 2002, Tokyo International Film Festival: Best Actor Award to Graham Greene
- 2003, PRISM Award in the Theatrical Feature Film category
