= Assassin's Creed III: The Tyranny of King Washington =

DLC for the 2012 video game Assassin's Creed III

- Developer: Ubisoft Montreal
- Publisher: Ubisoft
- Composer: Lorne Balfe
- Series: Assassin's Creed
- Engine: AnvilNext
- Platforms: PlayStation 3; Xbox 360; Wii U; Microsoft Windows; PlayStation 4; Xbox One; Nintendo Switch
- Release: The Infamy: PlayStation 3, Xbox 360, Microsoft Windows; WW: February 20, 2013 Wii U; WW: February 21, 2013; The Betrayal: PlayStation 3, Xbox 360, Microsoft Windows; WW: March 20, 2013 Wii U; WW: March 27, 2013; The Redemption: PlayStation 3, Xbox 360, Microsoft Windows; WW: April 23, 2013 Wii U; WW: April 27, 2013; Remastered: PlayStation 4, Xbox One; WW: March 29, 2019 Nintendo Switch; WW: May 22, 2019
- Genre: Action-adventure
- Mode: Single-player

Assassin's Creed III: The Tyranny of King Washington is a downloadable content (DLC) expansion pack developed and published by Ubisoft for the 2012 action-adventure video game Assassin's Creed III. It follows protagonist Ratonhnhaké:ton / Connor as he awakens in an alternate reality where the main game's events involving him have never happened. Connor is tasked to find and defeat a fictionalized version of George Washington, who is empowered but mentally corrupted by an otherworldly artifact. After crowning himself King of the United States of America, Washington began to enslave the population of the American frontier and massacre those who resist his tyranny. Connor gains new mystical abilities over the course of the expansion’s narrative as he attempts to stop Washington and return to his original timeline.

The Tyranny of King Washington is the first major post-launch DLC pack for Assassin's Creed III. It consists of three episodes: The Infamy, The Betrayal and The Redemption, which were released periodically from February to April 2013 on various platforms. All three episodes are included as part of Assassin's Creed III Remastered, the 2019 remaster of the main game alongside all related content. Each of the DLC episodes were met with mixed reviews from video game publications.

== Gameplay ==
The Tyranny of King Washington is a downloadable content (DLC) pack for the 2012 video game Assassin's Creed III. It consists of a single-player narrative campaign which is separated into three episodic installments. Players assume the role of Ratonhnhaké:ton (also known by his adopted English name, Connor), a half-British, half-Mohawk member of the Brotherhood of Assassins. While the DLC features a continuation of the gameplay elements from the base game, Connor never had the opportunity to become an Assassin in this continuity. Instead, he gains new mystical powers in each episodic installment which are themed after his Mohawk cultural heritage: the "Power of the Wolf" for stealth, allowing Connor to temporarily turn invisible; the "Power of the Eagle" for speed, which allows him to turn into an eagle for short flights; and the "Power of the Bear" for strength, which produces a devastating shockwave to knock back all nearby enemies. Connor also has access to a fourth ability called "Alpha of the Pack" which summons astral wolves to assist in battle.

== Plot ==
Some time after the events of Assassin's Creed III and the end of the Revolutionary War, George Washington secretly meets with Connor, telling him of dreams he has received from an Apple of Eden he had seized at the Siege of Yorktown. Concerned, Connor attempts to take the Apple away, but is transported into an alternate timeline, created by Washington's nightmares. In this reality, Connor never became an Assassin, his mother Kaniehti:io is still alive, his father Haytham Kenway died years ago, and Washington, corrupted by the Apple, has crowned himself the "Mad King" of the United States.

After Kaniehti:io tried and failed to steal Washington's source of power—a Scepter with the Apple affixed at the top—a furious Washington has mobilized his army to eliminate her and Connor's tribe. In desperation, the tribe's Clan Mother brews the Tea of the Great Willow, which can grant superhuman abilities with crippling side effects. However, Kaniehti:io forbids Connor from drinking the Tea and instead gives him Haytham's old Hidden Blades. When Washington's army attacks, most of the tribe, including Kaniehti:io, is killed, while Connor is gunned down by Washington after being overpowered by his Scepter. Nursed back to health by the Clan Mother, Connor reluctantly brews and drinks the Tea at her insistence, gaining the power to turn invisible and summon spectral wolves. The Clan Mother is later killed in a raid led by General Benedict Arnold, leading Connor to assassinate him. With his dying breath, Arnold reveals that he had been mind-controlled by Washington, and directs Connor to seek Benjamin Franklin.

Connor is captured by General Israel Putnam and taken to Boston to be executed, but manages to escape. In the process, he is reunited with his childhood friend Kanen'tó:kon, who is part of a resistance group led by Samuel Adams. After Kanen'tó:kon reveals that drinking more of the Tea can grant additional powers, Connor does so, gaining the ability to transform into an eagle. He then tracks down Franklin and frees him from Washington's control, whereupon Franklin agrees to help defeat Washington. However, Putnam's forces ambush and kill Adams and most of his rebels. With no other choice, Connor and Franklin seize a ship to escape Boston. Putnam arrives, holding Kanen'tó:kon hostage, but Connor kills him and rescues his friend. Connor, Franklin, and Kanen'tó:kon then set sail to New York, where Washington is building a pyramid.

As the trio approach New York, their ship is attacked by Washington's navy, scattering the crew. Kanen'tó:kon sacrifices himself to protect Franklin from Washington, and Connor drinks the Tea one final time, granting him the strength of a bear. They encounter another resistance group led by Thomas Jefferson attempting to attack Washington's pyramid. Connor helps Jefferson's rebels withdraw, and then works to gain additional support. In response, Washington addresses the people with a speech, boasting about his plans to invade England and enslave its people. Connor eventually sows enough chaos that the entire city rises up against Washington. Using a special key provided by Franklin, Connor infiltrates the pyramid, where he battles and defeats Washington. As Connor reaches for Washington's Scepter, they are both transported back to the original timeline. Terrified by the Apple's power, Washington gives it to Connor in order to dispose of it and departs. Later, in his office, Washington is met by an unknown man who suggests that he should become the King of the United States to strengthen the newly formed country. Reaffirmed by the events he witnessed, Washington flatly refuses, and as Connor tosses the Apple into the ocean, the man disappears, revealing he was just an illusion.

== Development and release ==
On October 3, 2012, Ubisoft revealed The Tyranny of King Washington as the first major downloadable content pack for Assassin's Creed III, and that it would be released in episodic format. The Tyranny of King Washington was available both as a standalone purchase and as part of the season pass for Assassin's Creed III. Scottish composer Lorne Balfe composed the music for The Tyranny of King Washington, with the soundtrack released via digital distribution on April 23, 2013.

On January 24, 2013, the first episode of the DLC was announced, titled The Infamy. It was released on February 19 for Xbox 360 and PC, February 20 for PlayStation 3, and on February 21 for the Wii U. On February 6, 2013, it was announced that the second episode, titled The Betrayal, would be released on March 19 for Xbox 360, PC and PlayStation 3 and an unknown date for Wii U (available in the eShop as of March 27), and that the third episode, titled The Redemption, would be released on April 23 for Xbox 360, PC and PlayStation 3. Despite being given a release date of May 16 for Wii U, The Redemption was made available on the eShop on April 27.

The Tyranny of King Washington is included with the remastered edition of Assassin's Creed III, along all with all previously released downloadable content. Assassin's Creed III Remastered was released on March 29, 2019, for Microsoft Windows, PlayStation 4, and Xbox One, and on May 21, 2019, for the Nintendo Switch.

== Reception ==
Aggregate review scores
Game	Metacritic
The Infamy	(PS3) 75/100 (Xbox 360) 73/100
The Betrayal	(PS3) 65/100 (Xbox 360) 67/100
The Redemption	(PS3) 70/100 (Xbox 360) 63/100

According to review aggregator Metacritic, all three episodes of The Tyranny of King Washington received generally mixed or average reviews on PlayStation 3 and Xbox 360, except for the PS3 version of The Infamy which had an overall favorable reception.

== See also ==
- Cultural depictions of George Washington
- Native Americans in popular culture
