= Desmond Miles =

Fictional character in Assassin's Creed

- Assassin's Creed character
- Render of Desmond Miles as he appears in Assassin's Creed: Brotherhood (2010)
- First appearance: Assassin's Creed (2007)
- Created by: Ubisoft Montreal
- Voiced by: Nolan North
- Motion capture: Francisco Randez

In-universe information
- Alias: The Reader
- Family: William Miles (father); Unnamed mother
- Significant other: Unnamed lover
- Children: Elijah (son)
- Relatives: Adam (ancestor); Aquilus (ancestor); Altaïr Ibn-La'Ahad (ancestor); Ezio Auditore da Firenze (ancestor); Edward Kenway (ancestor); Haytham Kenway (ancestor); Ratonhnhaké:ton / Connor (ancestor)
- Origin: Black Hills, South Dakota, United States
- Nationality: American

Desmond Miles is a fictional character in Ubisoft's Assassin's Creed video game series. He serves as the modern-day protagonist and framing character of the first five main installments of the series, from the 2007 inaugural title Assassin's Creed through to 2012's Assassin's Creed III. Through a device called the Animus, Desmond relives the genetic memories of several of his ancestors, including Altaïr Ibn-La'Ahad, Ezio Auditore da Firenze and Ratonhnhaké:ton / Connor, linking the games' different historical settings to a continuing modern-day conflict between the Assassin Brotherhood and the Templar Order.

Desmond is voiced by Nolan North, while his physical appearance was based on Canadian model Francisco Randez. Initially depicted as a reluctant participant in the Assassin–Templar conflict, he progressively acquires the abilities of his ancestors through a side effect of the Animus called the "Bleeding Effect" and develops from a largely passive framing character into an active member of the Assassins. His principal storyline concludes in Assassin's Creed III, while later installments continue to draw on his genetic memories and legacy.

Critical response to Desmond was mixed, with his comparatively subdued characterization and the modern-day sequences frequently criticized as less compelling than the historical portions of the games. Later commentary has reassessed his importance as the narrative connection between the early installments following Ubisoft's reduction and restructuring of the modern-day storyline after his departure from the series. Academic writers have analyzed Desmond in relation to posthumanism, racial identity, inherited memory, historical representation and the layered relationship between the player, the modern-day avatar and the historical character being experienced through the Animus.

== Concept and development ==
Desmond's existence was deliberately concealed in the marketing for the original Assassin's Creed. Game Informer retrospectively noted that promotional material had concentrated on Altaïr and the historical setting, making the game's opening in a contemporary environment and the introduction of a previously undisclosed playable protagonist unexpected to many players. The publication described Desmond as the mechanism through which the otherwise distinct historical protagonists and periods were connected. Desmond's physical appearance was derived from Canadian model Francisco Randez, who was photographed and digitally scanned by Ubisoft during development of the first game.

North voiced Desmond throughout the character's original story arc. Desmond was initially written with comparatively little established background. During development of Assassin's Creed: Revelations, writer Darby McDevitt explained that this had originally allowed the player to learn about the fictional universe alongside him. As the series progressed, Ubisoft sought to shift Desmond from a passive observer into a character with a personal history and role of his own. Revelations consequently explores his upbringing within an isolated Assassin community, his departure from his family and the circumstances that led to his capture by Abstergo Industries.

McDevitt said that the events preceding Revelations also gave the writers an opportunity to explore Desmond's psychological deterioration from repeated exposure to the Animus. Following his collapse at the conclusion of Assassin's Creed: Brotherhood, his mind is represented as fragmenting under the accumulated memories of the historical figures he has experienced. According to McDevitt, placing Desmond alone within the Animus allowed the developers to temporarily slow the contemporary Assassin–Templar storyline and instead develop his background, family relationships and sense of identity.

Accounts of Ubisoft's original long-term plans for Desmond have varied. Former Assassin's Creed III creative director Alex Hutchinson recalled in 2025 that the series was initially envisioned as a trilogy consisting of two historically focused games followed by a third installment that would focus much more extensively on Desmond in the contemporary setting. According to Hutchinson, the success of the franchise caused Ubisoft to expand the series with Brotherhood and Revelations, complicating the serialized modern-day plot before Assassin's Creed III was developed. North has separately recalled being told of plans extending across approximately eight or nine games in which Desmond would progressively develop into an accomplished Assassin. PC Gamer noted that the conflicting recollections nevertheless indicate that Ubisoft's plans for both Desmond and the broader franchise changed substantially as the series expanded.

By Assassin's Creed III, Ubisoft intended to provide greater resolution to Desmond's central narrative. Lead designer Steve Masters said that the developers wanted to bring "finality" to his story after recognizing frustration with the comparatively slow progression of the modern-day narrative in Brotherhood and Revelations. The game therefore gives Desmond a more active role outside the Animus while moving the contemporary storyline substantially forward. Hutchinson similarly described the preceding games as having gradually built Desmond from an ordinary individual into someone possessing the skills of his ancestors, and said the team hoped the payoff would cause players to reassess the character's earlier development. Hutchinson also acknowledged contemporary player fatigue with Desmond, comparing his intended character arc to Luke Skywalker's development and arguing that the character might be viewed more favorably once the complete arc could be considered retrospectively.

North later said that he had not been explicitly informed that the ending of Assassin's Creed III represented Desmond's death and instead learned of the character's fate from a fan on social media after the game's release. North said he was "very sad" to stop playing Desmond and that he had expected to remain with the character for considerably longer.

== Appearances ==
Desmond is introduced in Assassin's Creed as a former member of the Assassin Brotherhood who abandoned the isolated community in which he was raised and became a bartender. He is abducted by Abstergo Industries, the modern corporate manifestation of the Templar Order, after the company identifies him as the descendant of several historically significant Assassins. Abstergo forces him to enter the Animus, a machine capable of reconstructing memories encoded in his DNA, so that researchers can access the life of his ancestor Altaïr and locate powerful artifacts known as Pieces of Eden. Repeated use of the machine causes Desmond to experience the "Bleeding Effect", through which abilities and perceptions belonging to his ancestors begin carrying over into his contemporary life.

In Assassin's Creed II, Desmond escapes from Abstergo and joins a small Assassin cell. The group deliberately makes further use of the Bleeding Effect by having him experience the life of Renaissance Assassin Ezio Auditore, enabling Desmond to acquire Assassin skills rapidly. Brotherhood continues the search for technology left by the precursor civilization later known as the Isu, while Desmond becomes increasingly capable of operating independently outside the Animus. At the game's conclusion he is compelled by the Isu figure Juno to attack his ally Lucy Stillman and subsequently falls into a coma.

Assassin's Creed: Revelations places Desmond's consciousness within the Animus while his body remains comatose. In addition to completing Ezio and Altaïr's intertwined stories, Desmond reconstructs memories of his own upbringing, revealing his dissatisfaction with the Assassin community in which he was raised and the circumstances that led him to leave his family. The experience leads him to accept his place in the Brotherhood and prepares him to confront the impending catastrophe identified by the Isu.

In Assassin's Creed III, Desmond reunites with his father, William Miles, and travels with the Assassins to an Isu site known as the Grand Temple. He relives the memories of his ancestors Haytham Kenway and Ratonhnhaké:ton in order to obtain the information necessary to access technology capable of protecting Earth from a solar catastrophe. Desmond also undertakes missions in the contemporary world using the abilities gained through the Bleeding Effect. At the Temple, he is presented with a choice between allowing the catastrophe to occur or activating an Isu device that will protect humanity while releasing Juno from confinement. Desmond chooses the latter and dies while activating the device.

Later games retain elements of Desmond's story without restoring him as the principal modern-day protagonist. In Assassin's Creed IV: Black Flag, Abstergo collects genetic material from his body and stores his memories digitally, allowing company employees to experience the memories of Edward Kenway without being his direct descendants. Assassin's Creed Valhalla later reveals that Desmond's consciousness survived his physical death within an Isu simulation. Having lost much of his former identity, he appears as a luminous figure known as the Reader and examines branching timelines in an attempt to prevent future catastrophes. Modern-day protagonist Layla Hassan eventually enters the simulation and elects to remain there to assist him.

== Reception and analysis ==
=== Critical response ===
Desmond received a divided critical response during his period as the principal modern-day character. Criticism generally centered on the contrast between his restrained characterization and the more colorful historical protagonists. PC Gamer later described him as having been widely regarded as bland, particularly when his modern-day sections interrupted the historical scenarios that formed the bulk of each game. Writing immediately after Desmond's departure, Omri Petitte of PC Gamer similarly mocked his lack of personality while nevertheless acknowledging that the character had been the central figure permitting players to access the series' more popular historical protagonists. Chris Carter of Destructoid wrote in 2013 that he had initially enjoyed the modern-day framing device but had gradually become tired of Desmond, and praised Black Flag for reducing the mandatory contemporary material and making much of it optional.

Other commentary emphasized Desmond's importance to the franchise's narrative structure. In a 2012 feature on unexpected playable protagonists, Game Informer argued that Desmond could be considered the most important character in the series because the modern-day threat and First Civilization storyline made him the connection between Altaïr, Ezio and Connor. The publication described him as the "uniting factor" of the early games and his storyline as the "glue" holding the wider narrative together despite his comparatively limited involvement in the historical gameplay. A separate Game Informer retrospective published shortly before Assassin's Creed III likewise called Desmond the "uniting thread" of the games released to that point.

Later commentary has more frequently emphasized Desmond's structural importance. A 2020 feature by Jeuxvideo.com described him as the franchise's "meta hero", arguing that his significance to the overarching narrative could be overlooked because historical protagonists such as Ezio and Altaïr were more immediately prominent. In a retrospective on Black Flag, Willa Rowe of Inverse argued that Desmond's removal demonstrated how much North's performance had contributed to the earlier modern-day sequences. Rowe argued that North's charismatic performance had been what made the earlier modern-day sections work, finding the unnamed replacement protagonist and contemporary vignettes in Black Flag more convoluted and less engaging without him.

=== Academic analysis ===
Elisabeth Herbst Buzay and Emmanuel Buzay analyze the original Assassin's Creed as operating through two narrative levels and a "double avatar": the contemporary Desmond and his twelfth-century ancestor Altaïr. They argue that Desmond's role is not simply to frame Altaïr's story, because the two characters' perspectives and characterization are deliberately doubled through the Animus. While Altaïr undertakes an overt heroic redemption quest, Desmond's contemporary role is closer to that of a detective trying to understand his confinement, Abstergo's intentions and his own place within the conflict. The authors ultimately interpret the first game as Desmond's search for his own identity and origins, with that search continuing through later installments.

Martin Isaac Weis similarly identifies Desmond as the protagonist linking the historical settings of the early series. Analyzing the games' synchronization mechanic, Weis argues that the player is not simply reproducing a fixed historical sequence: success depends on learning how to perform the remembered actions correctly, so repetition, player skill and the reconstruction of historical experience become intertwined. Desmond therefore occupies an intermediate position between the contemporary player and the historical Assassin, making the process through which the past is reconstructed part of the games' fiction rather than an invisible gameplay convention.

Media scholar Konrad Wojnowski analyzes Desmond's role in the original Assassin's Creed as part of what he terms the game's "simulational realism". Wojnowski argues that the Animus turns Desmond into a fictional analogue of the player: the real player controls Desmond, while Desmond in turn experiences and effectively controls Altaïr within a second simulated layer. Elements that would conventionally exist outside the fictional world, including menus, checkpoints and health indicators, are represented as components of the Animus interface. Wojnowski therefore interprets Desmond's position between the player and Altaïr as helping collapse the distinction between the game's interface and its narrative world. Wojnowski additionally argues that Desmond's ancestral memories transform the historical past from an objectively represented setting into a private experience generated in the present. Rather than literally travelling through time, Desmond accesses information encoded within his own body and reconstructed by technology; the historical world therefore exists for the player as both a personal memory and a computer-generated simulation. For Wojnowski, the relationship between Desmond and the Animus is central to how the first game makes conventional video-game mechanics such as replaying failed sequences part of the fiction itself.

Aubrie Adams devotes a three-page entry to Desmond in the 2017 reference work 100 Greatest Video Game Characters. Adams interprets him as an atypical protagonist whose identity develops through the increasing separation between his consciousness and his physical body. Because the Animus permits him to experience other lives and later acquire their abilities, Adams argues that Desmond's body becomes progressively less necessary to his role in the series, connecting the character to posthuman ideas about using technology to transcend biological limitations. Adams also examines Desmond's characterization as a gradual movement from an initially undefined intermediary toward an individual identity of his own. At the beginning of the series he functions primarily as a means through which the player experiences stronger personalities belonging to his ancestors; over time he absorbs their abilities while simultaneously forming an identity as an Assassin independent of them. Adams argues that the character possesses greater psychological depth than is immediately apparent, but that much of it depends on players engaging with optional conversations and material detailing his family background, alienation and responses to the Animus. She further discusses his diverse ancestral heritage in the context of player-character representation, contrasting his relatively subdued characterization with the hypermasculine protagonists prevalent in contemporary action games.

Historians Vincent Boutonnet and David Lefrançois devote a subsection of their study of historical representation in the series to "Desmond Miles et l'histoire falsifiée" ("Desmond Miles and falsified history"). They identify Desmond as the central player-controlled character of the earliest installments and argue that the science-fiction device of his genetic memories is essential to the series' narrative progression and its movement between historical periods and the present. In their analysis, the historical settings are not ends in themselves: the information Desmond acquires from his ancestors is used to shape the present and prevent or alter the future. They also treat his departure as a structural turning point, after which the series develops new mechanisms for allowing unrelated users to access memories harvested from other people.

Amanda Phillips analyzes Desmond from a different perspective in the 2022 article "Fixing the Past: Memory Tourism, Multiraciality, and White Innocence in Video Games". Phillips describes the early Assassin's Creed games as using Desmond as an "avatar of the avatar": a contemporary character whose genetic ancestry allows the player to enter historically and culturally different identities. Phillips interprets the Animus as a form of "memory tourism", in which historical experience is encoded biologically and made playable through Desmond's body. Phillips places this device within a broader analysis of race and multiracial representation in games. While characterizing Desmond himself as a white protagonist, Phillips argues that the series gives him access to a wide range of racial and cultural identities through supposedly inherited genetic memory, allowing the games to mediate histories of colonialism and racial difference through a contemporary avatar perceived as partially belonging to those histories. Phillips contrasts this genetic model with later versions of the Animus that permit memories to be extracted from biological remains and accessed by unrelated users, removing even the fictional requirement that the player-character share ancestry with the historical subject.

Sarah Juliet Lauro likewise examines the layered relationship between player, modern-day avatar and historical body in Kill the Overseer!: The Gamification of Slave Resistance. Discussing Assassin's Creed III, she describes Desmond as the frame-narrative character through whom the player inhabits Connor, his Mohawk ancestor, and uses this structure to question the implications of allowing a presumed white male contemporary avatar—and, by extension, an anticipated white player—to occupy racialized historical bodies and their struggles. Lauro contrasts this mediated structure with later games and expansions such as Liberation and Freedom Cry, in which the player more directly occupies the historical protagonist.

== Legacy ==
Although Desmond ceased to be the principal protagonist after Assassin's Creed III, contemporary coverage already treated his absence as a significant change to the structure of the franchise. Ahead of Black Flag, Ubisoft described him as an important legacy whose story would continue to influence the series, while PC Gamer observed that removing him left open the question of how the modern-day narrative would operate without the character who had previously connected its historical periods. His genetic material consequently becomes a plot device in Black Flag, enabling Abstergo to transform the ancestral-memory technology into something that no longer requires the user to be directly descended from the historical individual being simulated.

Later criticism reassessed the value of Desmond's modern-day narrative in light of the franchise's subsequent structure. In 2025, Rick Lane of PC Gamer noted that the character's poor contemporary reputation had been followed by a degree of retrospective nostalgia as Ubisoft struggled to create an equally persistent modern-day storyline after his departure. Lane argued that although Desmond himself had often been considered dull, the continuing narrative surrounding him gave the early series a sense of direction that later installments sometimes lacked.

Ubisoft itself later described the character in similar structural terms. In 2024, franchise head Marc-Alexis Côté called Desmond a "narrative anchor point" for the early series and said that his journey had placed the modern Assassin–Templar conflict at the heart of the search for the Pieces of Eden. Côté acknowledged that, after Desmond's arc ended, the contemporary storyline struggled to find its footing and to maintain a meaningful connection between the historical and present-day portions of the games. Hayes Madsen of Inverse made a similar assessment in 2025, arguing that Desmond's sequences gave the early installments a sense that their individual historical stories were building toward a larger narrative, whereas much of the post-Assassin's Creed III modern-day material lacked a comparably unified narrative and thematic direction.

Desmond's appearance as the Reader in Valhalla also reframed his apparent death in Assassin's Creed III. North reprised the role for the sequence, with later coverage describing the Reader as Desmond's surviving consciousness rather than a restoration of his physical body. The development also corresponds with Adams's earlier interpretation of Desmond as a posthuman character whose narrative progressively deemphasized the necessity of his physical form.

The connective role of Desmond's storyline continued to receive retrospective attention. Writing for GamesRadar+ in 2026, Oscar Taylor-Kent argued that the modern-day sections of the early games transformed the stories of Altaïr, Ezio and Connor from otherwise disconnected historical adventures into a continuing narrative centered on Desmond and the wider contemporary conflict. Taylor-Kent contrasted this structure with later entries in which the modern-day material was reduced or moved outside the individual games, arguing that the loss of an equivalent framing story made the wider franchise feel increasingly disconnected.
