= List of Assassin's Creed characters =

An illustration of most of the protagonists in the Assassin's Creed series. From left to right: Adéwalé, Ratonhnhaké:ton (Connor), Arno Dorian, Altaïr Ibn-La'Ahad, Evie Frye, Bayek, Kassandra, Alexios, Aya, Jacob Frye, Ezio Auditore, Edward Kenway, Aveline de Grandpré, and Shay Cormac.

Assassin's Creed is a multimedia franchise published by Ubisoft, primarily known for its open-world action-adventure stealth video games. Beyond gaming, the series spans novels, comics, films, and an upcoming Netflix series. The narrative blends historical fiction with science fiction, centering on a millennia-old conflict between two secret societies: the Assassin Brotherhood (inspired by the Order of Assassins), who champion peace through free will, and the Templar Order (inspired by the Knights Templar), who seek peace through total control.

A central series convention involves a modern-day protagonist experiencing the lives of historical figures through the Animus, a simulation device developed by the Templar corporate front, Abstergo Industries. The series is currently divided into three main eras:

- The Desmond Miles Saga (AC I – AC III): The first five games follow Desmond Miles, a descendant of several master Assassins. By reliving his ancestors' memories, Desmond seeks "Pieces of Eden"—powerful artifacts left behind by the Isu, a precursor race that created humanity but perished in a prehistoric global catastrophe.
- The Helix Era (Black Flag – Syndicate): Following Assassin's Creed III, Abstergo developed "Helix" technology, allowing anyone to explore genetic memories via harvested DNA without being a direct descendant. During this era, the player assumes the role of unnamed research analysts representing themselves within the universe.
- The Layla Hassan Saga (Origins – Valhalla): More recent entries follow Layla Hassan, a former Abstergo employee who developed a portable Animus and eventually joined the Brotherhood.

This article details the major historical and fictional characters from the games and the 2016 film. While most entries feature standalone stories set in specific historical civilizations, some are closely linked—most notably the "Ezio Trilogy" (AC II, Brotherhood, and Revelations). To maintain clarity and avoid repetition, characters are listed by their first or most significant appearance, where their entire history is described.

== Modern-day characters ==
=== Desmond Miles saga ===
==== Desmond Miles ====
Desmond Miles
- Assassin's Creed character
- First game: Assassin's Creed (2007)
- Created by: Ubisoft Montreal
- Voiced by: Nolan North
- Motion capture: Francisco Randez

In-universe information
- Alias: The Reader
- Family: William Miles (father); Unnamed mother
- Significant other: Unnamed lover
- Children: Elijah (son)
- Relatives: Adam (ancestor); Aquilus (ancestor); Altaïr Ibn-La'Ahad (ancestor); Ezio Auditore da Firenze (ancestor); Edward Kenway (ancestor); Haytham Kenway (ancestor); Ratonhnhaké:ton / Connor (ancestor)
- Origin: Black Hills, South Dakota, United States
- Nationality: American

Desmond Miles (13 March 1987 – 21 December 2012) was a fictional character from Ubisoft's Assassin's Creed video game series. He is the protagonist of five Assassin's Creed installments, with his journey uniting the frame story of the first five installments. Desmond has also appeared in smaller capacity in subsequent games in the series, as well as various spin-off media. He is voiced by actor Nolan North, and modeled after Canadian fashion model Francisco Randez. According to several video game journalists and authors, Desmond's character is meant to represent a form of transcendence symbolically from the necessity of the human body.

In the franchise, Desmond is a descendant of a long line of important characters, including Adam, Aquilus, Altaïr Ibn-La'Ahad, Ezio Auditore da Firenze, Edward Kenway, Haytham Kenway, and Ratonhnhaké:ton / Connor, most of whom were members of the Assassin Brotherhood, a fictional organization inspired by the real-life Order of Assassins that is dedicated to safeguarding peace and freedom. Born into the Brotherhood, Desmond is trained as an Assassin from a young age, but his desire to lead a normal life eventually prompts him to run away from home and cut ties with the Assassins. However, he is eventually kidnapped by the Templar Order, the Assassins' mortal enemies, who force him into a machine called the Animus that allows Desmond to experience the genetic memories of his ancestors. In doing so, the Templars hope to locate powerful artifacts called Pieces of Eden and enslave all of humanity. Desmond manages to escape and, after accepting his Assassin heritage, rejoins the Brotherhood to help them stop the Templars. In the process, he learns that he is destined to save humanity from an impending solar flare, and continues to explore his ancestors' memories to find the technology of a precursor race called the Isu, who were wiped out by a similar disaster.

Critical reception of the character has been mixed. Many reviewers and video game journalists criticized Desmond as a dull and uninteresting protagonist, whose story arc does not match the quality of the historical plots featured in each of the games, though more positive commentary focused on North's performance and Desmond's character development. The decision to have Desmond killed off in Assassin's Creed III also proved controversial, as both critics and players noticed a significant decrease in the importance of the series' modern-day storyline after his death. Nevertheless, Desmond is considered to be a significant part of the franchise's identity.

===== Creation and development =====
According to his voice actor Nolan North, the original plan for Desmond was that he would feature in six games, acquiring the skills of his Assassin ancestors to become "The Ultimate Assassin", and at some point would be able to time-travel between different time periods. North became greatly interested in the concept but was scrapped. Adding upon this, North commented that he saw Desmond as a boring protagonist who ultimately had no direction to go forward, describing the character as "a fork in the road". Desmond has been defined as a MacGuffin, namely that "he exists to move the story forward, but he provides little substance."

Following the release of Assassin's Creed III and the conclusion of Desmond's storyline, lead designer Steve Master said: "What we're trying to do is bring some finality to Desmond's story. To actually wrap up what you've opened and experienced with him." Jean Guesdon, the creative director of the series, later said that Desmond is an important character in the Assassin's Creed series, and that despite his death, he would continue to play an important role in the franchise.

In 2016, Michael Fassbender starred in and co-produced a film adaptation of the series, titled Assassin's Creed. Initially thought to be cast as Desmond, Ubisoft later stated that Fassbender would play a new character, named Callum "Cal" Lynch.

===== Appearances =====
In the original Assassin's Creed, Desmond is introduced as a former Assassin leading a simple life as a bartender in New York City. In order to hide his identity, he lives under assumed names and uses only cash to protect himself. Despite this, he is eventually tracked down and captured by Abstergo Industries, a front organization for the modern-day Templar Order. Once inside Abstergo's facility in Rome, Desmond is forced to enter the Animus, a machine that allows him to relive the memories of his ancestors stored in his DNA. The Animus translates these memories into a three-dimensional environment, where Desmond retains some degree of control, but must remain synchronized with his ancestors' exact actions at any given moment or else he risks being kicked out of the Animus. Under the watch of Abstergo's lead scientist, Dr. Warren Vidic, and his assistant Lucy Stillman, Desmond is instructed to relive the memories of Altaïr Ibn-La'Ahad (1165–1257; Syria), to help Abstergo find specific information they are looking for, which Vidic refuses to disclose.

After recovering the information sought by Abstergo—a map showing the locations of various Pieces of Eden, ancient artifacts of great power created by a Precursor race—Vidic's superiors order Desmond to be killed. Lucy's quick thinking saves him, as she persuades Vidic to keep him alive until they know he is of no further use. Upon returning to his room, Desmond, suffering from the "Bleeding Effect" due to prolonged exposure to the Animus, discovers he has gained one of Altaïr's abilities: Eagle Vision. This allows him to discern friend from foe and to read cryptic messages written on walls and floors by Subject 16, the previous Animus test subject that Lucy and Vidic occasionally mention.

Assassin's Creed II continues from where the first game left off, as Desmond escapes from the Abstergo facility with the help of Lucy, revealed to be an undercover Assassin. After being taken to the Assassins' hideout, Desmond meets the rest of Lucy's team—historian Shaun Hastings and technician Rebecca Crane—and enters the Animus 2.0, built by Rebecca, to be quickly trained as an Assassin via the Bleeding Effect. Desmond begins reliving the memories of Ezio Auditore da Firenze (1459–1524; Italy), his ancestor from the Renaissance, in order to graft his skills and abilities onto himself. After successfully navigating Ezio's early memories, Desmond is extracted from the Animus to avoid the mental degradation that Subject 16 suffered as a consequence of the Bleeding Effect. Soon after, Desmond involuntarily relives a memory of Altaïr while outside of the Animus, as a result of the Bleeding Effect.

After spending more time in Animus 2.0, Desmond begins to adjust to his newly developed skills and becomes a master freerunner and expert fighter, just like his ancestors. The last segment of Ezio's memories brings an astonished Ezio and Desmond to a futuristic chamber underneath the Sistine Chapel, where they are met by a hologram of Minerva, a member of the Precursor race known as the Isu that created humanity and the Pieces of Eden. Minerva addresses Desmond by name, knowing that he is reliving Ezio's memories, and talks about a cataclysm which wiped out most of her race thousands of years ago, and which is set to occur again by the end of that year, if Desmond does not prevent it. Desmond is then pulled from the Animus as Abstergo discovers the Assassins' hideout, forcing the team to escape to a new hideout.

In Assassin's Creed: Brotherhood, Desmond, Lucy, Shaun, and Rebecca arrive at Monteriggioni, where they set up a safe house in the Villa Auditore's sanctuary. Desmond re-enters the Animus 2.0 to continue reliving Ezio's memories and discover what he did with the Apple of Eden he had obtained, hoping to use the artifact to defeat the Templars and stop the cataclysm Minerva warned him about. After learning Ezio hid the Apple under the Colosseum, Desmond and the other Assassins head there to retrieve it. Desmond takes the Apple, but through it another Isu named Juno takes control of his body and forces him to stab Lucy, saying that she would have betrayed him if he allowed her to accompany him any further. Desmond then falls into a coma and is placed back into the Animus by two unknown Assassins in a bid to preserve his consciousness.

In Assassin's Creed: Revelations, Desmond awakens within the Black Room, a safe mode area for the Animus. In the Black Room's Animus Island, he meets the digital construct of Subject 16, Clay Kaczmarek, who tells Desmond that he must find a "Synch Nexus", a memory that links him with Altaïr and Ezio, so that the Animus can reintegrate his shattered subconscious and awaken him from his coma. While in this state, Desmond can hear conversations between Shaun, Rebecca, and his father, William Miles, who are concerned about his state, and access five memory sequences that detail his own life prior to his abduction by Abstergo. In these sequences, Desmond reminisces of his time on "the Farm", where he grew up in secrecy among other Assassins, and his father's harsh training, which prompted him to run away on his 16th birthday, due to not wanting to live the life his parents had chosen for him. Eventually, he moved to New York, where he got a job at a high-end bar, but always regretted not being able to properly say goodbye to his parents. Following his abduction, he blamed himself for not taking his parents' warnings and training more seriously. In the present, Desmond realizes that his easiest days are now behind him and finally accepts his role as an Assassin.

When the Animus begins to delete Animus Island to get rid of excess data. Clay sacrifices himself to prevent Desmond from being deleted, but not before transferring his own genetic memories onto him. Eventually, Desmond is able to reach the Synch Nexus, which allows him to communicate with the Isu Jupiter, who directs him to find the Grand Temple so that he may use the technology inside to save humanity from the solar flare set to hit the Earth in several weeks. Following this, Desmond awakens from his coma to find Shaun, Rebecca, and William next to him, and simply states that he knows what they have to do.

The Lost Archive downloadable content for Revelations expands upon Desmond's time in the Black Room, as he involuntarily experiences Clay's memories prior to the latter's death. Through these memories, he learns that Lucy was in fact a double agent for the Templars, and that his escape from Abstergo was staged as part of "Project Siren." In reality, Vidic had ordered Lucy to extract Desmond to a place where he would feel safe so that he would willingly enter the Animus and facilitate the search for Ezio's Apple of Eden, which Abstergo planned to send to space via satellite in an effort to enslave humanity. However, this plan came to a halt when Juno forced Desmond to kill Lucy.

In Assassin's Creed III, Desmond arrives at the Grand Temple, located in a cave system in New York, and accesses it using Ezio's Apple of Eden. With the help of his father and friends, Desmond relives the memories of his ancestors Haytham Kenway (1725–1781; England) and Ratonhnhaké:ton / Connor (1756–unknown; Colonial America) using the new Animus 3.0, hoping to find the Key to the Temple's Central Vault, where the solution to stopping the solar flare is located. During his breaks in-between Animus sessions, Desmond explores the Temple and speaks with Juno, who tells him more of her race's history and their failed attempts to survive the Great Catastrophe. The Assassins also search for Isu batteries to power the Grand Temple and allow them to access the Central Vault, with Desmond being sent to retrieve them due to his superior skills. Desmond successfully retrieves two batteries from Manhattan and São Paulo, where he has run-ins with the Templar Daniel Cross, dispatched by Abstergo to capture him. As the date of the solar flare approaches, William volunteers to retrieve the final battery so Desmond can locate the Key, but is captured by Abstergo and taken to their Rome facility in an attempt to get Desmond to surrender his Apple of Eden. Instead, Desmond storms the facility to rescue his father, killing Cross and Warren Vidic and reconciling with William in the process.

After retrieving the Key, Desmond and his allies enter the Central Vault, discovering a pedestal. The holograms of Minerva and Juno then appear, with the former warning Desmond not to touch the pedestal, as it would kill him and release Juno, who was imprisoned in the Temple to prevent her from conquering humanity. In response, Juno shows Desmond a vision of what will happen if the solar flare hits the Earth: although Desmond will become a messiah-like figure to other survivors and will be revered as a god after his death, future generations will manipulate his legacy for their personal gain. After several moments of consideration, Desmond decides to release Juno, believing humanity has a better chance at fighting her than rebuilding society after the solar flare. As the others leave the Temple, Desmond touches the pedestal, which frees Juno and activates a protective shield around the Earth that stops the solar flare, at the cost of his own life.

Despite his death, Desmond remains a powerful asset for the Templars and Assassins in Assassin's Creed IV: Black Flag. Shortly after his death, an Abstergo recovery team was sent to collect samples from his body for their new Sample 17 Project. His DNA is stored in Abstergo Entertainment's servers, where a crew of analysts is tasked with reliving his copied genetic memories and learning about his ancestors. One of them, the player character, is tasked with reliving the memories of Edward Kenway (1693–1735; Wales), Haytham Kenway's father and Connor's grandfather. While this is ostensibly to gather data for a feature film about Edward's life, in reality Abstergo seeks to find the Observatory, an Isu site hosting an advanced tracking device and several vials of Isu blood samples. During their research, the player character steals and sends back to the Assassins several recordings left by Desmond detailing his initial doubts of leaving the Farm, his acceptance of the role he had been chosen to play, and his love for his parents. Because Abstergo can now collect anyone's genetic memories without having to use blood-related analysts, his body gives Abstergo full knowledge about his family life.

In 2015, during the events of Assassin's Creed Syndicate, a boy named Elijah is brought by his mother to an Abstergo clinic in New York City. Abstergo analysts discover that the boy shares exactly the same patrilineal lineage of Desmond, indicating that he may have been unknowingly conceived by him a few years after his escape from the Farm. On top of that, it is also revealed that the boy is a Sage, the reincarnation of a member of the Isu species. An Abstergo researcher proposes to kidnap the boy and conduct vivisection on him. Another researcher, Isabelle Ardant, opposes the idea, stating that it would be better to abduct the boy when he is older and place him in the Animus for 50 years so that Abstergo can study his lineage.

In Assassin's Creed Valhalla, it is revealed that when Desmond sacrificed himself to save the Earth, only his physical form was killed, as his consciousness was transported into a computer simulation created by the Isu known as "The Grey." During his time there, Desmond forgot his original identity and was transformed into a being of pure light called The Reader, whose task is to analyze various branching timelines to determine ways of preventing future cataclysms. In 2020, the Assassin Layla Hassan enters the Grey in an attempt to slow the magnetism of the global aurora borealis device, which was activated by Desmond when he died. Here, Layla meets the Reader and shows him more possibilities and calculations based on timelines he had not explored. Layla then decides to stay in the Grey and help the Reader explore more timelines, allowing her mortal body to die.

Additionally, the player can find and listen to two audio logs of Desmond on Layla's computer, recorded shortly before his death. In the first, he talks about his life as an Assassin and his lack of choice in the matter, which he finds ironic given the Brotherhood's advocation for free will. He also expresses his belief that the Assassins have become more dogmatic and stagnant in time, as most have stopped thinking about the actual meaning of the Creed; despite this, he still believes in the Assassins' cause and considers that people sometimes need limitations. In the second log, Desmond talks about his ancestors and how he feels overwhelmed after having relived so many different lives in a short time span, as well as how he doesn't consider himself special for being descended from the Isu, believing that anyone can join the Assassins and make a difference in the world.

===== Reception and analysis =====
Desmond received mixed reviews from critics, primarily due to his uneven characterization and development. He was voted the 20th top character of the 2000s by Game Informer readers. PlayStation Universe rated him as one of the PlayStation 3's worst characters, saying: "While voiced admirably by the ubiquitous Nolan North, it's impossible to shake the feeling of pure monotony when stepping into Desmond's shoes when all you want to do is hop back in time and stab people in the face."

The significance of Desmond as an atypical video game protagonist and as a character study on posthumanism is analyzed by Aubrie Adams in the 2017 publication 100 Greatest Video Game Characters. Adams commented that as his mind travel through time and experiences the memories of his ancestors, aided by the technological innovations of science fiction plot devices like the Animus, his body appears to have become increasingly unnecessary throughout the franchise. From this view, the technology that enables him to transcend the biological limitations of his frail body taps into a cultural zeitgeist that desire the idea of extending life throughout technology. Adams cited the character's continued presence in the storylines of later games in spite of his apparent death in Assassin's Creed III, along with fan theories and official in-game lore which confirm the persistence of his consciousness in the virtual environment, which is indicative of his conclusive change into a posthuman character who transcended his trivial need for a physical form.

Adams highlighted the significance of the introduction of Desmond as a character during a time period when white hypermasculine player characters were the norm in the video game industry, emphasizing in particular his depiction as a subdued protagonist who is psychologically complex, and of an ambiguous ethnicity as the result of his diverse ancestral heritage. The story arc in the early Assassin's Creed titles centered around Desmond, where his identity gradually evolves from a blank state who subsumes the characteristics and skills of others into a highly skilled Master Assassin, is also marked by his evolving individuality as he comes to terms with his shifting personal identity and acceptance that he is part of a lineage that is bigger than the sum of its parts. Adams commented that there is a compelling depth to Desmond as character but only if players are willing to engage in the largely optional experiences that follow his psychological journey and illuminate the details of his past.

==== Lucy Stillman ====
Lucy Stillman (1988 – 10 October 2012) (voiced by Kristen Bell) is a member of the modern-day Assassin Brotherhood and genetic memory researcher for Abstergo Industries' Animus Project. During her infiltration of Abstergo, she reports on the company's recent activities to the Assassins. However, Lucy's lengthy separation from the Assassins and her distrust for William Miles leads her to defect to the Templar cause prior to 2011. When Desmond Miles is brought into Abstergo for testing, Warren instructs Lucy to earn Desmond's trust so that the Templars can find the Piece of Eden located within his memories and use it for their Eye-Abstergo satellite. As Desmond's condition begins to worsen, Warren and Lucy resort to more drastic measures, and formulate Project Siren. Lucy is ordered to take Desmond somewhere he would feel safe, and the two Templars orchestrate Desmond and her escape from Abstergo. Lucy carries out her orders and relocates Desmond to a hideout to join his fellow Assassins Shaun Hastings and Rebecca Crane. After a month and another relocation to the ruined Villa Auditore in Monteriggioni, the Assassin team discovers the location of an Apple of Eden, which is inside the Colosseum Vault. When Desmond's hand makes contact with the Apple, his body is possessed by the Isu Juno. With her knowledge of Lucy's true allegiance, Juno forces Desmond to stab and kill Lucy with his Hidden Blade. Desmond would later learn of Lucy's betrayal while involuntarily reliving the memories of Clay Kaczmarek, Subject 16 of the Animus Project.

==== Warren Vidic ====
Dr. Warren Vidic (died 14 December 2012) (voiced by Philip Proctor) is the head of the Abstergo's Animus project and a member of the Inner Sanctum of the Templar Order. In Assassin's Creed: Bloodstone, he is introduced to Abstergo Industries by William King Harvey, a CIA director and double agent for the Templar Order. He inherits the Bluebird project from Colonel Boris Pash, which is the precursor of the Animus project. As the head of research for Abstergo, Vidic is put in charge of the genetic memory research and the Animus project. As the one responsible for finding new subjects for the Animus, Warren has them explore their genetic memories, which he would then analyze to gain information on both the Assassins and the Pieces of Eden. As a high-ranking employee of Abstergo Industries, Warren is also one of the few members of the Inner Sanctum, a group of Templars with full awareness of the Orders' plans for their "New World". He plays an important role in those plans, being tasked with finding a Piece of Eden to power Eye-Abstergo, a satellite which uses the Piece of Eden's power to control humanity. In Assassin's Creed, Vidic experiments on Desmond Miles with the Animus, forcing him to relive the memories of Altaïr Ibn-La'Ahad so that Abstergo can obtain a map showing the locations of countless Pieces of Eden around the globe. Following Desmond's escape from Abstergo in Assassin's Creed II, Vidic leads several agents to attack the Assassins' hideout in an attempt to re-capture him, though this attack fails and Vidic is forced to flee. Afterwards, he shifts his focus to overseeing the training of a number of Templar agents through the Animus, as seen in the multiplayer modes in Assassin's Creed: Brotherhood and Assassin's Creed: Revelations. In Assassin's Creed III, after capturing William Miles, Vidic is killed by Desmond when the latter storms Abstergo's Rome facility to rescue his father. In Assassin's Creed IV: Black Flag, an e-mail sent by Abstergo Entertainment COO Olivier Garneau reveals that Warren had volunteered as Subject 2 for his Animus Project, where he relived the life of an ancestor in 18th-century Hungary and of one of Joan of Arc's executioners in 1431.

==== Shaun Hastings ====
Shaun Hastings (born 1985) (voiced by Danny Wallace) is a cynical, condescending, and pessimistic member of the modern-day Assassin Brotherhood, specializing in research and information handling. He is introduced as a member of Lucy Stillman's team that helps Desmond in his mission to find Pieces of Eden and save the world. Through conversations in Assassin's Creed II, Desmond learns that Shaun was interested in conspiracies from an early age, and developed a love of history. Although he was unaware of the existence of modern-day Templars and Assassins, Shaun realized that there was some sort of power struggle going on. Shaun attempted to tell others about his findings, not realizing that the Templars would try to silence him. Rebecca Crane "rescued" Shaun and recruited him into the Brotherhood. This is mentioned as being unconventional, as most Assassins are born into the Order, not recruited. In 2013, following Desmond's death, Shaun infiltrates Abstergo by working as a coffee vendor at their Entertainment subsidiary in Montreal to find out what happened to Desmond's body. A year later, Shaun (under the alias "Deacon") and Bishop enlist the help of a Helix player to locate the remains of a Sage during the French Revolution. In 2015, with the help of the same player, Shaun and Rebecca infiltrate Abstergo's London headquarters and locate the Shroud of Eden hidden in a vault underneath the city, but lose it to the Templars after a struggle. In 2020, Shaun and Rebecca are assigned to work with Layla Hassan in investigating the strange strengthening of Earth's magnetic field, and later meet Basim Ibn Ishaq, whom they put in contact with William Miles.

==== Rebecca Crane ====
Rebecca Crane (born 1984) (voiced by Eliza Schneider) is a member of the modern-day Assassin Brotherhood and the creator of the Animus 2.0, which she affectionately refers to as "Baby". She is introduced in Assassin's Creed II as a member of Lucy Stillman's team and works with Desmond towards finding Pieces of Eden and saving the world. She provides technical support for the other members of the Brotherhood alongside her fellow Assassin, Shaun. After Desmond's death, Rebecca works with Shaun to infiltrate Abstergo Entertainment as a courier. In 2015, Rebecca and Shaun head to London with fellow Assassin Galina Voronina to locate and extract the Shroud of Eden. Their efforts fail, and Rebecca is wounded when she takes a shot meant for Shaun. The trio manages to escape after Galina dispatches most of the Abstergo agents surrounding them. In 2020, Rebecca and Shaun are assigned to work with Layla Hassan in investigating the strange strengthening of Earth's magnetic field, and later meet Basim Ibn Ishaq, whom they put in contact with William Miles.

==== William Miles ====
William Miles (born 1948) (voiced by John de Lancie) is Desmond's estranged father and de facto leader of the modern-day Assassin Brotherhood, having risen to the position following the death of the previous Mentor in 2000. He raised Desmond in the ways of the Assassins, teaching him about the order and what they fight for. William's first appearance is in the ending scene of Assassin's Creed: Brotherhood, where he can be heard telling his fellow Assassins to put Desmond in the Animus to save his mind after the latter has fallen into a coma. In Assassin's Creed: Revelations, he can be heard talking with Rebecca and Shaun during Desmond's time in the Animus Black Room, explaining Desmond's importance to the Assassins due to his ability to wield the Apple of Eden properly. He questions Rebecca and Shaun if Desmond and Lucy were close, and feels sad about Lucy's death. He is the first person to greet Desmond after recovering from his coma. In Assassin's Creed III, William and his team arrive at the Isu Grand Temple and search for power cells to activate it while Desmond is in the Animus, exploring his ancestors' memories to find the key to the Temple's Inner Chambers. He is captured by Abstergo agents in Egypt while attempting to retrieve a power cell and is taken to their facility in Rome. Desmond infiltrates the facility and rescues William, reconciling with him in the process. Following Desmond's death, a grief-stricken William retires from the position of Mentor of the Brotherhood and goes into hiding, but eventually reclaims the title in 2015. In Assassin's Creed Origins, William travels to Egypt to recruit Layla Hassan to the Assassins. In Assassin's Creed Valhalla, William meets Basim Ibn Ishaq at the latter's request and agrees to work with him to further the Assassins' goals, though not before demanding a sample of Basim's genetic material, to allow the Assassins to observe Basim's genetic memories and be convinced of his motives.

==== Clay Kaczmarek (Subject 16) ====
Clay Kaczmarek (1982 – 8 August 2012) (voiced by Cam Clarke in Assassin's Creed II and Assassin's Creed: Brotherhood and by Graham Cuthbertson in Assassin's Creed: Revelations), also known as Subject 16 of the Animus Project, is a member of the modern-day Assassin Brotherhood and descendant of Ezio Auditore da Firenze. Born into a family of engineers, Clay faces psychological problems due to developmental disorders and his father's neglectful attitude, and runs into the Assassins while looking for acceptance. As a member of the Brotherhood, Clay's most important mission is to infiltrate Abstergo Industries as a subject of the Animus Project to obtain more information on the Animus. Labeled Subject 16, Clay is forced to relive the memories of his ancestors via his genetic memory. When Clay finds out that his teammate, Lucy Stillman—who infiltrated Abstergo years before and was tasked with getting Clay out of Abstergo safely—had abandoned their cause to join their enemies, the Templars, Clay spends days and hours of sessions inside the Animus. Since it leaves his mind incapable of separating his own personality from those of his ancestors, Clay becomes mentally unstable to the point that he commits suicide. After his alleged death, Clay continues to exist as an AI recreation of his personality within the Animus, and is able to manipulate much of the Animus' programming from within to help Desmond. In Assassin's Creed: Revelations, when the Animus begins to delete excess data after Desmond achieves full synchronization with Altaïr and Ezio, Clay sacrifices himself to help Desmond escape the Animus, though not before passing on his genetic memories to him.

==== Daniel Cross ====
Daniel Cross (9 March 1974 – 14 December 2012) (voiced by Danny Blanco-Hall) is a member of the Templar Order and a sleeper agent tasked with infiltrating the Assassin Brotherhood to assassinate its Mentor. He is the grandson of Innokenti Orelov and the great-grandson of Nikolai Orelov, a prominent member of the Russian Assassin Brotherhood. Cross is responsible for the Great Purge of 2000, in which most of the modern Assassin Brotherhood was killed. He is introduced as the modern-day protagonist of the comic book series Assassin's Creed: The Fall, and makes his first on-screen appearance in Assassin's Creed III, where he is assigned the task of hunting down Desmond Miles. Cross is ultimately killed by Desmond when the latter storms Abstergo's Rome facility to rescue his father.

=== Research analyst / Helix player saga ===
==== Erudito ====
Erudito is a hacking collective that works against Abstergo Industries, being aware of its true nature. The collective's primary goal is to expose the truths censored by Abstergo in its products, to make the general public aware of the Assassin-Templar conflict. This can be seen in Assassin's Creed III: Liberation, where they contact the unnamed player character during their playthrough of Abstergo's newest video game, Liberation, and help them uncensor it. Because of their similar goals, Erudito would at times work with the Assassins against the Templars.

==== Abstergo research analyst ====
The Abstergo research analyst, nicknamed "Noob", is the modern-day protagonist of Assassin's Creed IV: Black Flag. They are never seen or referred to by name, being controlled from a first-person perspective. In 2013, the analyst is hired by Abstergo Entertainment, a subsidiary of Abstergo Industries that produces multimedia goods to be sold to the general public, and is assigned to work on the Sample 17 Project, consisting of various products based on the genetic memories of the late Desmond Miles' ancestors. The analyst relives the memories of Edward Kenway to collect footage for an upcoming interactive film, but during their work, they are contacted by John Standish, who persuades them to investigate Abstergo and recover sensitive information on the company, which is then delivered to Shaun Hastings and Rebecca Crane to help the Assassins. Although the analyst soon becomes suspicious of John's motives, they are blackmailed into pushing forward, eventually hacking a terminal which would allow Juno to come back to life by possessing someone. However, Juno is not strong enough yet to possess the analyst, so John tries to weaken them with poison, but is killed by Abstergo's security forces before he could do so. The analyst is then allowed to return to work, as evidence found on John's computer implicated him as the sole person responsible for the hacks. However, they would eventually resign by November 2014.

==== Helix research analyst ====
The Helix research analyst, nicknamed "Numbskull", is the modern-day protagonist of Assassin's Creed Rogue. Similarly to the analyst from Assassin's Creed IV: Black Flag, they are never seen or referred to by name, and are controlled from a first-person perspective. In 2014, they are hired by Abstergo Entertainment to use their Helix software to relive the memories of Shay Patrick Cormac (1731–unknown; Colonial America), but inadvertently trips a hidden memory file that infects the Animus servers. After cleaning them, the analyst is thanked for their services, and invited to join the Templar Order, or be killed to keep the order's existence secret; their decision is not revealed.

==== Helix player / The Initiate ====
The Helix player, referred to as "The Initiate" after their induction into the Assassin Brotherhood, is the modern-day protagonist of Assassin's Creed Unity and Assassin's Creed Syndicate. They are an individual contacted by the Assassins through their agent, Bishop, to help them on at least two separate occasions: once in 2014, when they located the body of François-Thomas Germain, an 18th-century Sage, by reliving the memories of Arno Dorian (1768–unknown; France) through the Helix software they own; and again in 2015, when they relived Jacob and Evie Frye's (1847–unknown; England) memories to find the Shroud of Eden in London.

==== Melanie Lemay ====
Melanie Lemay (voiced by Cristina Rosato) is the research analyst's supervisor at Abstergo Entertainment in Assassin's Creed IV: Black Flag and a member of the Templar Order. In 2013, she is assigned to oversee the Sample 17 Project alongside Olivier Garneau. Sometime between Garneau's disappearance and the events of Assassin's Creed Rogue in 2014, she is promoted to CCO.

==== Olivier Garneau ====
Olivier Garneau (died 30 May 2014) (voiced by Vincent Hoss-Desmarais) is the CCO of Abstergo Entertainment and a member of the Templar Order. In 2013, he is ordered by Laetitia England, the Head of the Operations Division of Abstergo Industries, to use the Sample 17 Project to locate the Observatory for the Templars. Later, while en route to a shareholders meeting in Chicago, he goes missing and is never heard from again. In Assassin's Creed Origins, it is revealed that he was killed by Aiden Pearce (The protagonist of Ubisoft's other game, Watch Dogs), likely hired by the Assassin Brotherhood.

==== John Standish ====
John Standish (16 August 1975 – 26 November 2013) (voiced by Oliver Milburn) is the head of the IT department at Abstergo Entertainment's Montreal facility and a member of the Instruments of the First Will, a cult of followers of Juno who seek to bring her back to life. He is also a Sage, the reincarnation of Juno's husband Aita. During his work at Abstergo, he uses other employees, to whom he grants access to restricted areas of the company, to retrieve sensitive information and deliver it to the Assassins, while covering his own involvement. In 2013, during the events of Assassin's Creed IV: Black Flag, he does the same with the newly hired research analyst, but also secretly plots to have them possessed by Juno. However, when it comes time to put his plan into action, he discovers Juno is not strong enough to return yet. John then tries to poison the analyst to make them weak enough for Juno to enter their body, but is shot and killed by Abstergo's security forces.

==== Juhani Otso Berg ====
Juhani Otso Berg (born 17 June 1985) (voiced by Andreas Apergis) is a high-ranking agent of the Operations Division of Abstergo Industries and a member of the Inner Sanctum of the Templar Order. After appearing as a faceless playable character in Assassin's Creed: Brotherhood's and Assassin's Creed: Revelations' multiplayer modes, he makes his on-screen debut in Assassin's Creed Rogue. A former member of the Finnish Special Forces-turned-mercenary, Berg is approached by Warren Vidic in 2010 to join Abstergo, who in return provides cystic fibrosis treatment for his daughter. By 2012, Berg rises to the rank of Master Templar, joins the Inner Sanctum, and becomes the leader of Abstergo's elite commando unit, Sigma Team. Berg is the one who captures William in Cairo during the events of Assassin's Creed III. He also oversees the genetic research of Shay's memories in Assassin's Creed Rogue alongside Templar colleagues Violet de Costa and Melanie Lemay before aiding the Abstergo search for the Shroud of Eden in 2015 during Assassin's Creed Syndicate. During his work for Abstergo he crosses paths with and fights Shaun Hastings and Rebecca Crane, as well as Russian Master Assassin Galina Voronina. In 2018, during the events of Assassin's Creed Odyssey's The Fate of Atlantis DLC, Berg leads Sigma Team to Greece to kill Layla Hassan and retrieve the Staff of Hermes Trismegistus, but they are defeated and Berg himself is crippled by Layla with the Staff. He is then taken prisoner by the Assassins, but eventually returns to Abstergo, and regains use of his legs through experimentation with a Staff of Eden.

==== Violet da Costa ====
Violet de Costa (14 June 1988 – August 2018) (voiced by Lucinda Davis) is a member of the Templar Order and Sigma Team's historical research specialist. She oversees the genetic research of Shay Cormac's memories during Assassin's Creed Rogue, guiding the Helix researcher and inviting them to join the Templar Order. She later participates in the search for the Shroud of Eden in 2015, accompanying Berg and Isabelle Ardant, and fighting off Shaun, Rebecca, and Galina who are also pursuing the Shroud. Distracted by Berg and the rest of Sigma Team, the Assassins are unable to stop Violet escaping with the Shroud. Violet is revealed to be a member of the Instruments of the First Will, a human cult devoted to returning humanity to obedience under the Isu, namely Juno. She is killed in 2018 by Berg for her betrayal during the fall of the Instruments of the First Will.

==== Bishop ====
Bishop (voiced by Kate Todd) is a member of the modern-day Assassin Brotherhood who is responsible for directing Assassin activity across the globe, often to sabotage the Templars. When the Brotherhood requires sets of genetic memories explored to acquire data, she contacts various individuals around the world to do so, as seen in Assassin's Creed Unity and Assassin's Creed Syndicate.

==== Isabelle Ardant ====
Isabelle Ardant (4 October 1969 – 25 October 2015) (voiced by Claudia Besso) is the Head of Historical Research at Abstergo Industries and a member of the Inner Sanctum of the Templar Order. In 2015, during the events of Assassin's Creed Syndicate, she leads the Templars' search for the Shroud of Eden in London, which culminates with a fight against Assassins Shaun Hastings, Rebecca Crane and Galina Voronina, who are also attempting to retrieve the Shroud. During the struggle, Ardant is stabbed and killed by Shaun.

==== Álvaro Gramática ====
Álvaro Gramática (4 April 1965 – August 2018) (voiced by Marcel Jeannin) is the Director of Research of the Future Technology division of Abstergo Industries and a member of the Inner Sanctum of the Templar Order. As one of Abstergo's leading scientists, he is in charge of the Phoenix Project, which is Abstergo's attempt to construct a living Isu, and has extensive knowledge of the Pieces of Eden. He is killed in 2018 during the fall of the Instruments of the First Will.

==== Galina Voronina ====
Galina Voronina (born 30 July 1983) (voiced by Patricia Summersett) is a member of the Russian Brotherhood of Assassins. She appears as one of the main characters of the Assassin's Creed comic book series, and makes her on-screen debut in Assassin's Creed Syndicate.

=== Layla Hassan saga ===
==== Layla Hassan ====
Layla Hassan (1984 – 16 August 2020) (voiced by Chantel Riley) is the modern-day protagonist of Assassin's Creed Origins, Assassin's Creed Odyssey, and Assassin's Creed Valhalla. Hailing from Egypt, Layla found work at Abstergo through Sofia Rikkin and created her own portable version of the Animus technology. However, she leaves the company in 2017, after Abstergo attempts to silence her for using the Animus to relive Bayek of Siwa's memories and learn about the origins of the Assassin Brotherhood. She is then recruited into the Brotherhood by William Miles, and begins searching for Pieces of Eden that would benefit the Assassins. In 2018, she finds the lost Isu city of Atlantis, where she receives the Staff of Hermes Trismegistus from Kassandra. However, while training with the Staff under the supervision of the Isu Aletheia, she loses control and accidentally kills her friend and fellow Assassin Victoria Bibeau. This incident deeply affects Layla, and, filled with guilt and remorse, she becomes depressed and starts a self-destructive lifestyle, such as smoking and drinking. It also strains her relationship with the other Assassins, and by 2020, she is reassigned to an Assassin cell with Shaun Hastings and Rebecca Crane. While investigating the strange strengthening of Earth's magnetic field, Layla relives the memories of Eivor Varinsdottir to find an Isu temple in Norway, which contains the technology to save the planet from destruction. Armed with the Staff, which protects her from the radiation inside the temple, Layla enters "The Grey", a digital afterlife created by the Isu, where she works with "The Reader" to restore the Earth's magnetic field to its proper strength. However, having dropped the Staff when she entered the Grey, Layla's physical body dies, and she chooses to stay with the Reader and help him explore various branching timelines to prevent future disasters.

==== Deanna Geary ====
Deanna Geary (died October 2017) is a member of Abstergo's Medical Team working at their Lineage Discovery and Acquisition facility in Philadelphia, and Layla Hassan's best friend. In 2017, the two are sent to Egypt to retrieve an artifact of high importance to Abstergo, with Deanna assisting Layla remotely from a hotel room. After Layla stumbles upon Bayek and Aya's mummified remains and, against Deanna's advice, relives their memories through the Animus, the two become targeted by Abstergo, who dispatch Sigma Team to silence them. Deanna is killed as a result and Layla vows revenge against Abstergo, leading her to later join the Assassins.

==== Victoria Bibeau ====
Dr. Victoria Bibeau (died October 2018) (voiced by Tara Nicodemo) is a former psychiatrist and researcher for Abstergo and former member of the Templar Order who defected to the Assassins. She was introduced in the Last Descendants novel series before making her on-screen debut in Assassin's Creed Odyssey, where she is assigned to Layla Hassan's cell as the team's doctor. She helps Layla locate Atlantis while monitoring her health and expressing concern due to the latter's long sessions in the Animus. After Layla travels to Atlantis, Victoria follows her closely behind and grows worried as she witnesses Layla being slowly corrupted by the Staff of Hermes Trismegistus. Eventually, Victoria attempts to end Layla's sessions in the Animus and take away the Staff for her own good, but the latter, in a fit of rage, accidentally strikes Victoria with the Staff, killing her. This incident sours Layla's relationship with the rest of the cell and takes a big toll on her mental health, as Layla blames herself for her friend's death.

==== Kiyoshi Takakura ====
Kiyoshi Takakura (voiced by Dai Tabuchi) is a Japanese Assassin and former member of the Yakuza featured extensively in Assassin's Creed expanded media. In Assassin's Creed Odyssey, he is a member of Layla Hassan's team, keeping watch on their hideout while the others search for Atlantis. He is never shown on-screen and only communicates with Layla over the radio or via earpiece. After Layla accidentally kills team member Victoria Bibeau, Kiyoshi leaves the team, though he and Layla are later able to part on good terms after being assigned to work together once again on a mission in Tokyo.

==== Alannah Ryan ====
Alannah Ryan (voiced by Elana Dunkelman) is a student and Assassin assigned to Layla Hassan's cell, which specializes in locating historical artifacts. Due to her lack of combat experience, Alannah serves as the team's historian and only assists the others remotely, providing Layla with useful information over the radio or via earpiece. After Layla accidentally kills team member Victoria Bibeau, her relationship with Alannah becomes strained and the latter elects to leave the team.

== Other characters in the Assassin's Creed series ==
=== Characters of Assassin's Creed (film) ===
After the sequel to Assassin's Creed was canceled, its narrative was continued in Assassin's Creed Origins and the Layla Hassan saga as a whole, with the inclusion of Marion Cotillard as Dr. Sofia Rikkin, an original character from the film, the film itself having continued Arno and Baptiste's storylines from Assassin's Creed Unity and Assassin's Creed III: Liberation, respectively.

==== Callum Lynch ====
Callum Lynch (portrayed by Michael Fassbender) (b. 1979) is a descendant of Aguilar de Nerha, a Spanish Assassin. After being rescued from his own execution by Abstergo, he is placed in the Animus to relive the memories of Aguilar and find the Apple of Eden. After reconciling with his father, who murdered his mother to keep her out of Templar hands, he joins the Assassin Order, retrieves the Apple, and kills Alan Rikkin.

==== Aguilar de Nerha ====
Aguilar de Nerha (portrayed by Michael Fassbender) is a Spanish Assassin and ancestor to Callum Lynch. During the Spanish Inquisition, he attempts to protect the son of the Sultan of Granada, an ally of the Assassins who possessed an Apple of Eden. He manages to escape with the Apple and passes it on to Christopher Columbus for protection.

==== Sofia Rikkin ====
Sofia Rikkin (portrayed by Marion Cotillard) is a scientist and the head of the Abstergo Foundation Rehabilitation Center in Madrid. She is also Alan's daughter, and the two have a difficult relationship. In October 2016, Sofia comes into contact with Callum. During their time together the pair form a connection, but when Callum's escape from the Foundation leads to him killing Alan, she dedicates herself to chasing down her father's killer.

==== Alan Rikkin ====
Alan Rikkin (portrayed by Jeremy Irons) (c. 1951 – 14 December 2016) is the CEO of Abstergo Industries and a member of the Inner Sanctum of the Templar Order. He originally had a minor role in the first game, where he sent several e-mails to Warren Vidic, one of which detailed several Pieces of Eden that the Templars believed to be nothing more than mythical tales, including the Holy Grail. In the film, he is depicted as the head of Abstergo's subsidiary organization, the Abstergo Foundation, and seeks to find the Apple of Eden through Aguilar de Nerha's memories. He eventually recovers the Apple from Christopher Columbus's tomb and attempts to perform a ritual to remove human free will, but is assassinated by Cal Lynch, who steals the Apple.

==== Maria ====
Maria (portrayed by Ariane Labed) is a member of the Spanish Brotherhood of Assassins during the 15th century, and a close ally to Master Assassin Aguilar de Nerha. In 1492, she and her fellow Assassins seek to prevent Prince Ahmed of Granada from being captured by the Templars, fearing that his father, the Sultan of Granada, would relinquish the Apple of Eden in his possession in exchange for his son's safety.

Alicia Vikander was originally considered for the role of Maria, but scheduling conflicts with Jason Bourne eventually caused the actress to drop out, with Ariane Labed being cast instead.

==== Tomás de Torquemada ====
Tomás de Torquemada (portrayed by Javier Gutiérrez) is a Spanish Dominican friar, the first Inquisitor General of Spain, and confessor to Isabella I of Castile. He is depicted as a high-ranking member of the Spanish Rite of the Templar Order. Under the influence of Rodrigo Borgia, Grand Master of the Italian Templars and Papal candidate, Torquemada opposes the Spanish Assassin Brotherhood, and persecutes them as part of the Spanish Inquisition.

=== Isu (major characters) ===
==== Minerva ====
Minerva (voiced by Margaret Easley), also known as Merva or Mera, is the first a member of the Isu, otherwise known as the "First Civilization", introduced in the series. She is a member of the Capitoline Triad, a renowned scientific group, along with Juno and Jupiter. In Assassin's Creed II, Minerva appears to Ezio via a pre-recorded hologram inside the Vatican Vault in 1499. Knowing that Desmond will eventually relive Ezio's memories, Minerva uses the latter as a conduit to pass on her message. She explains that her kind are not gods, but a more advanced civilization whose technology was mistaken for magic. They engineered humans as slaves, but they rebelled. Minerva describes how war with humanity, combined with a devastating cataclysmic event, led to the downfall of their civilization and the extinction of their race. She correctly predicted that a second cataclysmic event would eventually occur, and she hid away the tools humanity would need to survive in several vaults around the world, devising a system by which they could communicate across time before they eventually died. She instructs Desmond to find the vaults, then disappears, leaving a confused Ezio in her wake.

In Assassin's Creed III, she projects herself through the past one last time and finds Desmond in the Vault. She warns him about Juno's power-hungry ambitions, hoping that he will decide not to save the world and keep Juno imprisoned. Juno turns the tables and forces Minerva to reveal Desmond's destiny and how his legacy will be manipulated if he allows the cataclysm to happen. During her own natural lifetime, Minerva—known to adherents of Norse mythology as Gunlodr—met with the Isu leader Odin and played an unwitting part in his plot to survive the Great Catastrophe.

==== Juno ====
Juno (voiced by Nadia Verrucci), alternately known as Uni, is a member of the Capitoline Triad introduced in Assassin's Creed: Brotherhood. Although she reiterates Minerva's warning to Desmond, she is far more hostile and contemptuous of humanity. After Desmond recovers an Apple of Eden hidden by Ezio in the Roman Colosseum, Juno takes control of Desmond, forces him to kill Lucy, and instructs him to find "the one who would accompany you through the gate". In Assassin's Creed III, after Desmond kills Warren and Daniel, she takes the place of the modern-day main antagonist. It is revealed that Juno sought to conquer the rejuvenating world. When she tried to use Minerva's technology for her own ends, she was found and imprisoned in the Vault, with the other two members of the Triad hoping that she would fade away in time for the devices there to be activated safely. However, she endured, and she confronts Desmond and Minerva when the time comes to use the device. Juno spurs Minerva into showing the inevitable future if Desmond does not activate the device: humanity will start out well, and then sink back into their old ways and repeat the cycle all over again. Desmond decides to use the device, preventing the apocalypse, even though this would release Juno and cost him his life. Juno is released, and thanks Desmond's body before leaving her prison. She reappears later in Assassin's Creed Syndicate, where she ascends to leadership of the Instruments of the First Will, a sect of Isu worshippers who are loyal to her search for a way to restore her physical form. Juno was killed by Charlotte de la Cruz after gaining a physical form. During her own natural lifetime, Juno—known to adherents of Norse mythology as Hyrrokin—met with Odin and willingly aided him in his plot to survive the Great Catastrophe in exchange for assistance in restoring to life her lost love, Aita.

==== Jupiter ====
Jupiter (voiced by Peter Renaday), also known as Tinia, is a member of the Capitoline Triad. He appears to Desmond in Assassin's Creed: Revelations during the Nexus of Time. He elaborates more on the creation of the vaults, and shows the location of the central vault that contains all their accumulated knowledge. Although the humans tend to use his Roman name, Minerva refers to him by his Etruscan name, Tinia. During his own natural lifetime, Jupiter—known to adherents of Norse mythology as Suttungr—led a faction of Isu that Norse mythology would come to know as the Jötunheimr, or "giants". At one point the Jotunheimr waged war with an opposing faction of Isu known as the Aesir, led by Odin. Despite this, Jupiter welcomed his Aesir counterpart during the latter's visit to his realm and hosted a feast in his honor.

==== Aita ====
Aita was Juno's husband who volunteered to be a test subject for one of the Capitoline Triad's attempts to preserve the First Civilization. The experiment that he took part in is left vague, but Juno suggests that it preserved his body at the cost of his mind. Juno euthanized him when his mind "became brittle". He appears in Assassin's Creed IV: Black Flag as Bartholomew and John; Bartholomew is killed by Edward, while John commits suicide by forcing Abstergo security to shoot him; the latter's body is then taken by Abstergo to use in the Phoenix Project. Aita is subsequently reborn as the Sage in the form of Jacques de Molay and François-Thomas Germain in Assassin's Creed Unity, and an unnamed German spymaster working in London during the events of Assassin's Creed Syndicate. As Germain, he attempts to purge the Templar Order of complacency and restore its original purpose. As the German spymaster, his objectives are unknown, but as he is assassinated by Lydia Frye relatively quickly, it is noted that he was a particularly ineffective Sage. As the Sage, Aita is closely tied to the Instruments of the First Will, a cult worshipping Juno that believes humanity should be subservient to the Precursor race. Aita is the Etruscan name for Hades and Pluto.

==== Aletheia ====
Aletheia, known to adherents of Norse mythology as Angrboda, is an apparent sympathizer to the humans. She criticizes her fellow Isu for their treatment of their "useful apes", and reveals her disdain for their artifacts made to control the human populace. Trying to convince other Isu to join her cause, she praises the humans' achievements, among which includes the development of democracy and diplomacy. She implores the others to stop cowering before renouncing her position, not wanting to "be part of [their] exploitation" anymore. Before her death, she digitizes her consciousness into the Staff of Hermes Trismegistus, so that she can commune with Layla Hassan in the present and guide her on the path to become the "Heir of Memories". It is eventually revealed that Aletheia's actions were all part of a plot for her to reunite with her lover Loki, and to obtain vengeance against Odin for the imprisonment of their son Fenrir.

==== Odin ====
Odin, sometimes known as Havi, is an Isu ruler and leader of the Aesir, a nation of the Isu, in the years leading up to the Great Catastrophe. Introduced in Assassin's Creed Valhalla, Odin is determined to avoid his own fated death during the Great Catastrophe, known to the Aesir as Ragnarök. Selfish and deceitful, but loyal, Odin's obsession with avoiding his fated death causes him to imprison Loki's son Fenrir, and betray his brother, Tyr. With Juno's assistance, Odin succeeds in finding a way for him and a few trusted followers to survive Ragnarok through reincarnation. Odin is reincarnated in Eivor Varinsdottir, a 9th-century Viking raider who becomes embroiled in the Assassin – Templar conflict central to the series.

==== Tyr ====
Tyr is an Isu, a member of the Aesir nation, and close friend to Odin. Chief lawgiver of the Aesir, Tyr works tirelessly to keep the peace between Odin and Loki, the latter having betrayed the Aesir by fathering the child Fenrir with Aletheia. Tyr is betrayed by Odin during Fenrir's imprisonment and loses an arm in the process, but he is among Odin's counted few to be reincarnated after Ragnarök. He is eventually reincarnated in Sigurd Styrbjornsson, the adopted brother of Eivor Varinsdottir.

==== Loki ====
Loki (voiced by Carlo Rota) is an Isu, a member of the Aesir nation, and Aletheia's lover. As Fenrir's father, he seeks vengeance against Odin for his son's imprisonment. After betraying Odin, Loki is forbidden from joining his fellow Aesir in reincarnating after Ragnarök, but he formulates a plan with Aletheia that will allow them both to survive the coming catastrophe; while Aletheia transfers her consciousness into the Staff of Hermes Trismegistus, Loki uses the same device used by the other Aesir to reincarnate in the body of Basim Ibn Ishaq, who retains all of Loki's memories.

== Bibliography ==
- Banks, Jaime; Mejia, Robert; Adams, Aubrie (2017). 100 Greatest Video Game Characters. Rowman & Littlefield. pp. 51–53. ISBN 9781442278134.
- Bowden, Oliver (23 June 2011). Assassin's Creed: The Secret Crusade. Penguin UK. p. 464. ISBN 9780141966717. Archived from the original on 7 November 2023.
- Bowden, Oliver (26 November 2009). Assassin's Creed: Renaissance. Penguin UK. p. 528. ISBN 9780141046303. Archived from the original on 7 November 2023.
- Bowden, Oliver (25 November 2010). Assassin's Creed: Brotherhood. Penguin Books Limited. p. 544. ISBN 9780241951712. Archived from the original on 7 November 2023.
