= Ezio Auditore da Firenze =

Assassin's Creed character

Ezio Auditore
- Assassin's Creed character
- Ezio in his outfit from Assassin's Creed: Brotherhood (2010)
- First appearance: Assassin's Creed: Lineage (2009)
- First game: Assassin's Creed II (2009)
- Portrayed by: Devon Bostick (in Lineage)
- Voiced by: Roger Craig Smith; Giovanni Noto (in Chronicles: China)

In-universe information
- Fighting style: Italian school of swordsmanship (in Soulcalibur V)
- Family: Giovanni Auditore (father); Maria Auditore (mother); Federico Auditore (brother); Claudia Auditore (sister); Reza Auditore (brother); Alif Auditore (brother)
- Spouse: Sofia Sartor (wife)
- Children: Flavia Auditore (daughter); Marcello Auditore (son); Unnamed illegitimate child
- Relatives: Mario Auditore (uncle); Renato Auditore (great-grandfather); Domenico Auditore (great-great-grandfather); Isabetta Auditore (great-great-grandmother); William Miles (descendant); Desmond Miles (descendant); Elijah (descendant); Clay Kaczmarek (descendant); Noa Kim (descendant)
- Origin: Florence, Republic of Florence
- Nationality: Italian

Ezio Auditore da Firenze (Italian pronunciation: [ˈɛtt͡sjo audiˈtoːre da (f)fiˈrɛnt͡se]) is a fictional character in the video game series Assassin's Creed, serving as the principal protagonist of the series' games set during the Italian Renaissance. An Italian Master Assassin, his life and career as an Assassin are chronicled in Assassin's Creed II, II: Discovery (both 2009), Brotherhood (2010), and Revelations (2011), as well as the short films Assassin's Creed: Lineage (2009), Ascendance (2010), and Embers (2011) and various spin-off media of the franchise. In 2016, all three major games featuring Ezio, as well as Lineage and Embers, were re-released as an enhanced bundle titled Assassin's Creed: The Ezio Collection. Throughout most of his appearances, the character has been voiced by American actor Roger Craig Smith, while Canadian actor Devon Bostick portrayed him in live-action in Lineage.

Within the series' alternate historical setting, Ezio was born into Italian nobility from Florence in 1459. His family had long been loyal to the Assassin Brotherhood, a secret organization inspired by the real-life Order of Assassins dedicated to safeguarding peace and freedom, though Ezio did not learn about his Assassin heritage until his late teens, after most of his immediate kin was executed during the Pazzi conspiracy. His quest to track down those responsible sets him up against the Templar Order, the Assassins' mortal enemies, led locally by the House of Borgia. Spending decades fighting Rodrigo and Cesare Borgia and their henchmen, Ezio is eventually successful in restoring the Assassins to prominence in Italy, and becomes their Mentor in 1503. His further adventures lead him to Spain and the Ottoman Empire, where he again proves to be essential in helping the local Assassins overcome Templar threats. Following his retirement from the Brotherhood, Ezio settles down in Tuscany with his family, eventually dying from a heart attack in Florence in 1524.

The character has received critical acclaim and is often named among the greatest video game characters of all time. While most of the praise focuses on his portrayal and growth throughout the series, as well as the unique chronicling of his entire life, he has also been noted as one of the most attractive video game characters of all time. Due to his reception and the fact that he is the only character who is the protagonist of multiple major installments of the franchise, (Note: Altaïr is briefly playable in Assassin's Creed II and Revelations and is the protagonist of the handheld releases Altaïr's Chronicles and Bloodlines, but does not appear in any other major installments besides Assassin's Creed.) he is usually considered the face and most popular character of Assassin's Creed. Ezio's popularity has led to several crossover appearances outside of the series, notably in titles such as Soulcalibur V, For Honor, Fortnite, Brawlhalla, and Reverse: 1999, where he appears as a guest character.

== Development ==
When creating Ezio's character, the developers were keen on establishing similarities between the series' previous protagonist Altaïr Ibn-La'Ahad in style and general appearance, while at the same time differentiating Ezio from the former characterwise. His name, meaning eagle in Italian, was chosen to keep up the tradition of Altaïr, whose name meant "flying one" in Arabic. While Altaïr was described as a warrior monk bred for combat and the life of an assassin, Ezio's backstory was consciously designed in sharp contrast to make playing him feel like an "empowering experience". Unlike Altaïr, Ezio is not born into the Assassin Order and discovers his heritage only in his teens, while his main goal for most of the first game is to seek revenge on those who murdered his family. Even though this was made to be his main motivation for the early part of the game, his personal growth was to enable him to seek justice as the game progressed. Additionally, Ezio does not start out as a Master Assassin but has to hone his craft throughout, which was intended to make him more relatable to players. He learns new moves and abilities by being taught by friends and allies, unlike a progression tree, to make the players' immersion into the character feel more natural. In general, Ezio was designed to be a Renaissance man, who was to be open-minded and truth-seeking, but also fun-loving. The creative director of Assassin's Creed III, Alex Hutchinson, compared Ezio to actor Errol Flynn, as he was designed to be an over-the-top womanizer and braggart.

== Fictional character biography ==
=== Assassin's Creed II and II: Discovery ===
Ezio is an ancestor of Desmond Miles, the protagonist of most of the early series' modern-day sequences, who experiences Ezio's life through the Animus, a device unlocking hidden memories inside his DNA. As shown in the beginning of Assassin's Creed II, Ezio was born into the House of Auditore, a dynasty from the Italian city of Florence, in 1459. Tutored by the banker Giovanni Tornabuoni until the age of 17, Ezio led an affluent, care-free lifestyle until his father Giovanni discovered a plot to assassinate the leaders of Florence. Giovanni accused Francesco de' Pazzi as a conspirator, but when he presented the evidence to the gonfaloniere of Florence, Uberto Alberti, the latter is revealed to also be a conspirator and orders for the Auditore family's arrest. Out running errands for his father, Ezio is not home when his father and two brothers are arrested and later publicly hanged. Ezio, following his father's final advice, finds his Assassin tools and flees the city with his mother and sister to his uncle Mario's estate in Monteriggioni. Mario assists Ezio in discovering the people behind the conspiracy and trains him to become an Assassin.

While exacting revenge on the Pazzi dynasty, Ezio discovers that more people from outside Florence are involved in the conspiracy that got his father and brothers killed. The search for those responsible spans over a decade and leads Ezio from Florence to San Gimignano, Forlì, and eventually Venice. As he identifies and assassinates the Templar conspirators, Ezio gains several allies, including Niccolò Machiavelli, Caterina Sforza, and Leonardo da Vinci. These allies partly set Ezio on a path of redemption, helping him overcome his desire for revenge, and guide him on his quest. Eventually, Ezio confronts the mastermind behind the conspiracy, Rodrigo Borgia, who sought to unify Italy under the Templar banner and acquire a powerful artifact known as the Apple of Eden, which would lead the Templars to the fabled "Vault." Ezio recovers the Apple from Rodrigo, who manages to escape, and is formally inducted into the Assassin Brotherhood.

During the events of Assassin's Creed II: Discovery, which takes place from 1491 to 1492, Ezio travels to Spain to free his fellow Assassins, who have been imprisoned under the guise of the Spanish Inquisition. In the process, he discovers that the Templars are planning to sail west to discover the New World. Ezio has to save Christopher Columbus and confront Tomás de Torquemada to end the Templar threat. During his quest, he also befriends a number of Spanish Assassins who offer him aid, including Luis de Santángel and Raphael Sanchez. In the end, Granada is taken under siege by the Templars, and Ezio has to save the Nasrid King Muhammad XI.

By 1499, the Italian Assassins have discovered that the Vault sought by Rodrigo lies in Rome, prompting Ezio to infiltrate the Vatican to assassinate the Templar Grand Master, who has become Pope Alexander VI and wields the Staff of Eden. Ezio battles Rodrigo using the Apple, and despite being initially overpowered, he manages to defeat his opponent after challenging him to a fist-fight. Declaring an end to his personal vendetta, Ezio spares Rodrigo's life and opens the Vault after combining the Apple and the Staff. Inside, he is greeted by a hologram of Minerva, a member of the extinct First Civilization that created humanity and the Pieces of Eden. Minerva delivers a message intended for Desmond, warning him about a cataclysmic solar flare only he can prevent, which leaves Ezio confused as he questions who Desmond is.

=== Assassin's Creed: Brotherhood ===
At the start of Assassin's Creed: Brotherhood, Monteriggioni is besieged by the Papal Armies led by Cesare Borgia, Rodrigo's son and co-leader of the Templar Order. During the siege, the Apple of Eden is lost, Monteriggioni is destroyed, and Ezio's uncle Mario is killed. Escaping the city with his mother and sister, an injured Ezio sets off for Rome to destroy the Borgia once and for all; however, he collapses shortly thereafter. Days later, Ezio awakens in Rome and receives a new set of gear from Niccolò Machiavelli, who also saved him days earlier. After his wounds heal, Ezio and Machiavelli set their plan into motion: to liberate Rome and remove the Borgias from power permanently, as well as retrieve the Apple.

Slowly, over the next three and a half years, Ezio and his allies win a series of victories over the Borgias, restoring the city while destroying the Borgia's allies and resources. Ezio rebuilds the ranks of the Assassins and in time succeeds Machiavelli as Mentor, the leader of the Brotherhood. By 1503, Ezio has assassinated the clan's banker, Juan Borgia, and their French ally, the Baron de Valois, and incapacitated Lucrezia Borgia, leaving the Templars' power base in disarray. Cesare, in a fit of rage, kills his father and begins losing control over Rome. After retrieving the Apple, Ezio uses its power to destroy what is left of Cesare's army. By the end of the year, Borgia control over the city is completely broken, and Cesare is arrested by the new Pope, Julius II. After Cesare escapes imprisonment a few years later, Ezio uses the Apple to track him down before hiding the artifact in a secret vault beneath the Colosseum. In 1507, Ezio travels to Spain and catches up with Cesare at the siege of Viana. Ultimately defeating Cesare, Ezio throws him off the castle walls to his death.

=== Assassin's Creed: Revelations ===
After the events of Brotherhood, Ezio discovers a letter left behind by his father that talks about a hidden library full of vast knowledge underneath Masyaf Castle, left there by the legendary Assassin Altaïr Ibn-La'Ahad, setting the events of Assassin's Creed: Revelations in motion. Arriving at Masyaf in early 1511, Ezio is ambushed by Templar forces who occupy the fortress, also searching for Altaïr's library. After escaping capture and assassinating the Templar captain, Ezio recovers the journal of Niccolò Polo, which tells of five seals hidden in Constantinople that will open the door to Altaïr's library. Arriving in Constantinople, Ezio begins his search for the seals, while helping the local Assassins Guild, led by Yusuf Tazim, overthrow Byzantine Templar control. Over time, Ezio succeeds in eradicating the Templars' influence and resubjugating the city to the rule of the family of Prince Suleiman.

Ezio recovers four of the five seals with the help of book collector Sofia Sartor, for whom he soon develops romantic feelings. He then travels to an underground city in Cappadocia, the Templars' base of operations, and assassinates their leader, Manuel Palaiologos, from whom he recovers the final seal. However, Ezio is confronted by Suleiman's uncle, Prince Ahmet, who reveals himself as the true Templar Grand Master and threatens to harm Sofia if Ezio does not surrender the seals. Upon returning to Constantinople, Ezio finds that Ahmet has killed Yusuf and kidnapped Sofia, and rallies the Ottoman Assassins to fight Ahmet. After giving up the seals to save Sofia, Ezio chases Ahmet and eventually recovers the seals from him. A returning Sultan Selim I then kills Ahmet and thanks Ezio for saving his son and country, but at the same time orders him to leave the Ottoman Empire. Ezio and Sofia travel to Masyaf and open Altaïr's library, where the former finds Altaïr's remains and learns that the library's purpose was to convey a message to Altaïr and Ezio's mutual descendant, Desmond Miles, through another Apple of Eden. An aged Ezio decides he has seen enough violence and mystery for one life and leaves the Apple in the library. He also retires from the Assassins, putting his faith in Desmond that he will succeed where Ezio and Altaïr could not.

=== Assassin's Creed: Embers ===
In the animated short Assassin's Creed: Embers, the last years of Ezio's life are chronicled. After his retirement from the Assassins, he has settled down in a Tuscan villa near Monteriggioni with Sofia, with whom he had two children: Flavia and Marcello. In 1524, a mysterious Chinese woman appears at his door requesting his help. The woman, Shao Jun, is a member of the vanquished Chinese Assassin Brotherhood and seeks Ezio's advice in how to help her people and rebuild her order. After helping Shao Jun fight off soldiers sent by the Ming Emperor Jiajing, Ezio sees Shao Jun on her way back to China, armed with the wisdom she came seeking, as well as a box, which he tells her to open only if she loses her way. Shortly thereafter, while on a trip to the market square in Florence with Sofia and Flavia, Ezio suffers a heart attack and passes away at the age of 65.

== Other appearances ==
=== Assassin's Creed series ===
Ezio appears as a supporting character in the live-action short film Assassin's Creed: Lineage, which serves as a prequel to Assassin's Creed II and focuses on his father, Giovanni Auditore; he is portrayed by Devon Bostick. Ezio is also featured in Assassin's Creed: Ascendance, an animated short film set during the events of Brotherhood, which sees him meeting with a cloaked Leonardo da Vinci in Rome to gather information about Cesare Borgia.

In the modern-day sections of Assassin's Creed IV: Black Flag, a market analysis for Abstergo Entertainment, the fictional video games subsidiary of Abstergo Industries, can be found via hacking computers. The market analysis reveals Abstergo was looking into the possibility of using Ezio as the protagonist of a future project, but ultimately decided against it due to his violent and womanizing nature and him "corrupting" people into following the Assassins' flawed ideology. Despite this, in Assassin's Creed Unity, Abstergo has produced a fictional video game starring Ezio, titled Fear and Loathing in Florence, which can be seen at the start.

In the spin-off game Assassin's Creed Chronicles: China, which follows Shao Jun after the events of Embers, Shao Jun applies Ezio's teachings in her quest to restore the Chinese Assassins and considers him her mentor. In 2018, Ezio became a playable character in the free-to-play role-playing mobile game Assassin's Creed Rebellion. Like II: Discovery, the game is set during the Spanish Inquisition and features multiple characters from different installments of the series, as they build a Brotherhood to overthrow the Spanish Templar Order. Ezio is also featured as one of the three playable characters of the 2023 virtual reality game, Assassin's Creed Nexus VR. His story arc is set in 1509, in-between the events of Brotherhood and Revelations, and follows Ezio as he travels to Venice to recover some of his family's artifacts which have been stolen from Monteriggioni.

Ezio's Brotherhood outfit has been featured as an unlockable cosmetic option in most subsequent releases of the series. In 2020, it was added to Assassin's Creed Odyssey after being initially excluded at release. His Assassin's Creed II outfit has also been featured in several games, including Assassin's Creed Valhalla, added as part of the final content update for the game in December 2022.

Aside from the video games, Ezio has also been featured in a number of Assassin's Creed extended media. In literature, he appears as the protagonist of the novels Assassin's Creed: Renaissance, Assassin's Creed: Brotherhood, and Assassin's Creed: Revelations by Oliver Bowden, which adapt each of the major games featuring him. In 2017, Ezio appeared in the first issue of the Assassin's Creed: Reflections comic book miniseries, which sees him comforting a dying Leonardo da Vinci in 1519 while recounting his encounter with Lisa del Giocondo, the noblewoman who served as the inspiration for Leonardo's Mona Lisa. In 2021, Ezio was included as a playable character in the board game Assassin's Creed: Brotherhood of Venice by Triton Noir. The game features an original storyline set between the events of Brotherhood and Revelations.

=== Others ===
Due to his popularity, Ezio has made numerous crossover appearances outside of the Assassin's Creed franchise. All three of his prominent outfits from throughout the series have also been featured as unlockable cosmetic options in several games. In 2012, Ezio was included as a guest character in the fighting game Soulcalibur V. He also appeared in the 2014 and 2020 free to play role-playing mobile games Soul Hunters and AFK Arena, through a collaboration between developer Lilith Games and Ubisoft. Ezio later appeared as a boss in another one of Ubisoft's titles, For Honor. In the fighting game, players are encouraged to duel with and kill Ezio in a time-limited special event, active from December 2018 to January 2019. On 25 April 2024, Ezio was added as a "Hero Skin" cosmetic for the Peacekeeper character; unlike other skins in the game, he features reworked animations and original voice lines. In March 2022, Ezio was added as a playable character in Fortnite Battle Royale. He could be unlocked from the in-game store or by purchasing Assassin's Creed Valhalla or its Dawn of Ragnarök DLC on the Epic Games Store before March 2023. In July 2022, Ezio was added as a playable character to the fighting game Brawlhalla. In August 2025, Ezio was added as a playable character to the gacha game Reverse: 1999, alongside an original story campaign set in Renaissance Florence. In August 2026, Ezio appears in the mobile game Watcher of Realms as one of the unlockable characters introduced during its collaboration event with the Assassin’s Creed franchise.

Ezio's robes from Assassin's Creed II are unlockable to wear in the PlayStation 3 and Xbox 360 versions of Prince of Persia: The Forgotten Sands, LittleBigPlanet for the PlayStation 3, and PowerUp Heroes for Kinect on the Xbox 360. His Revelations outfit, under the name the "Dashin' Hashashin", was presented as promotional headgear to Team Fortress 2 players who had pre-ordered Revelations, along with a special knife modeled after his hidden blade (called "The Sharp Dresser") for the Spy class in the game. The robes are also featured as an unlockable skin in Final Fantasy XIII-2 and XV, as part of special events. In a time-limited special event in Monster Hunter World, players were able to unlock Ezio's Assassin's Creed II robes as a special armor. His Assassin's Creed II outfit was also added to Fall Guys in June 2022, while his Brotherhood outfit is included in the mobile battle royale game Free Fire.

In 2025, Ezio was featured in Balatro as part of its Friends of Jimbo 4 collaboration with Assassin's Creed, alongside other protagonists from the series. He was also added to Astro Bot as an unlockable character in an update featuring Assassin's Creed-themed content. In January 2026, Ezio appeared in The Division 2 as part of an Assassin's Creed collaboration, which added an outfit inspired by his appearance along with other themed cosmetic items. In addition, Ezio was added as a playable Legendary Champion in RAID: Shadow Legends as part of a limited-time collaboration with Assassin's Creed, alongside Kassandra, Edward Kenway, Bayek, and Basim Ibn Ishaq.

== Reception and legacy ==
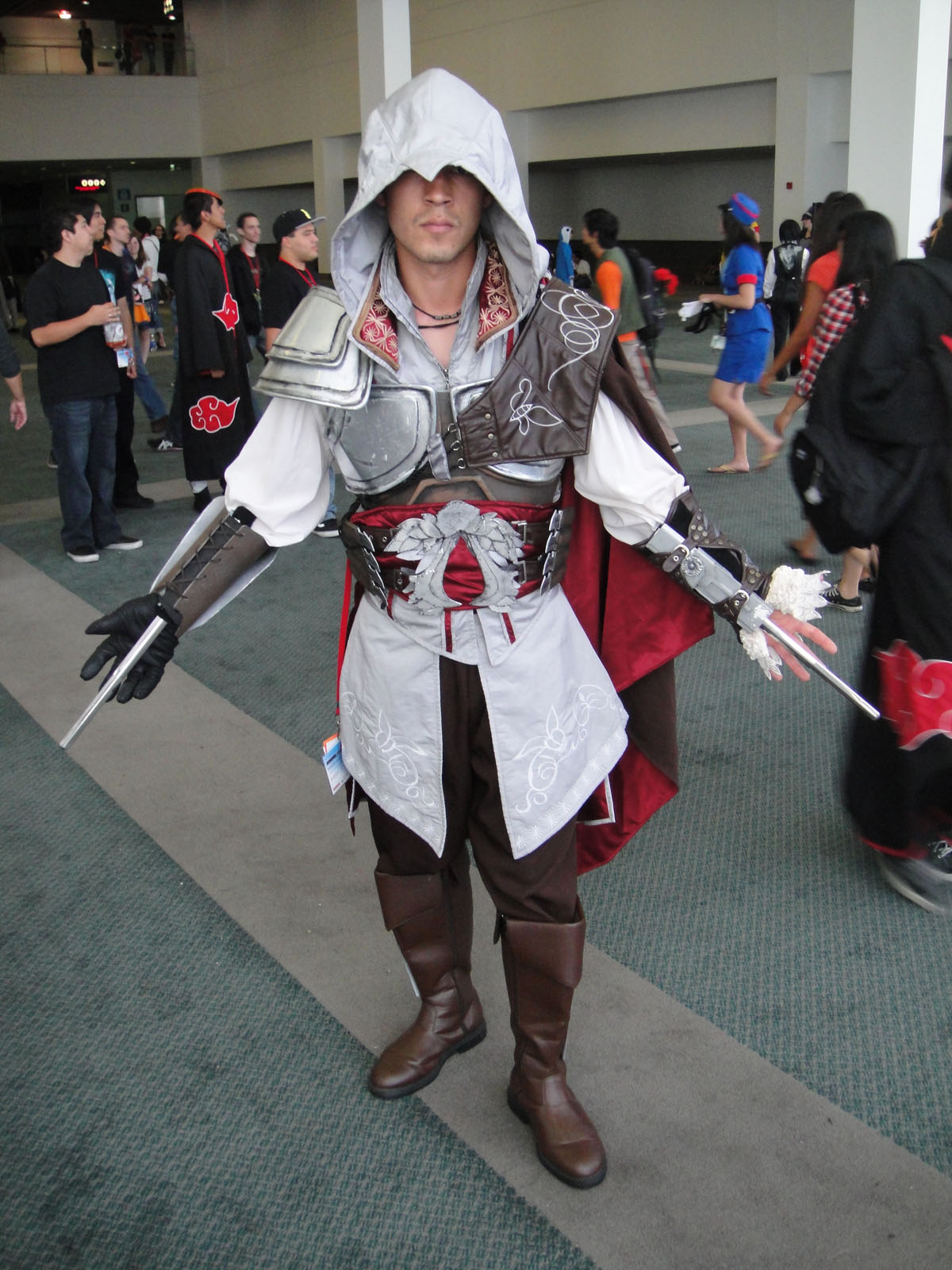
A cosplayer recreating Ezio Auditore's appearance in Assassin's Creed II

The character was critically acclaimed by the media and general public alike, with his depiction and transformation, as well as the chronicling of his entire life drawing significant praise. He is the only character in the series to receive several main games. Ezio is widely regarded as the series' best character and the face of the franchise, often finishing first in rankings of the series' characters. With the exception of II: Discovery (a Nintendo DS release), all games and films he appears in were re-released as an enhanced bundle, The Ezio Collection, for PlayStation 4 and Xbox One, in 2016. Like other protagonists in the series, Ezio has been also subject to merchandise. Ezio's likeness, along with five other series protagonists, was used for a line of character-themed wine labels as part of a joint collaboration between Ubisoft and winemaker Lot18; the full name of his label is "2015 Ezio Auditore Super Tuscan Red Blend", a reference to his birthplace of Florence, Tuscany.

Initial reception for Ezio as a character was positive. GamesRadar characterized him as an "ass-kicking, morally ambiguous superhero" and noted that he had a livelier and more charming personality than his predecessor Altaïr, with his personal growth being a central aspect of the narrative. Will Tutle of GameSpy also noted Ezio's growth and contrast to Altaïr as his strongest features, stating that while he was an unlikeable womanizer at first, he was later hoping he would "get his revenge and uncover the truth". In contrast, GameSpot's Kevin VanOrd called Ezio "terrific" and "instantly likeable", while praising him as a more realized character than Altaïr. In his review of Revelations, VanOrd lauded the developers for reflecting Ezio's age and weariness throughout the game, as well as highlighting his role as a mentor. Matt Miller of Game Informer stated that by Revelations, Ezio has grown from a boy seeking revenge to a man seeking wisdom, as well as a "venerable mentor", which was made a central aspect of his character. John Davison of GamePro named Ezio the epicenter of the game and drew a comparison between him and Nathan Drake. Like Drake, the "charming, witty, and comically self-deprecating" Ezio was "designed to draw the player into the narrative."

Ezio Auditore received an award from GameSpot for the "Best New Character" in 2009. GameZone authors Natalie Romano and Angelina Sandoval listed him third for "Gaming God of 2009", which ranks the most attractive video game men of the year. He was also nominated at the Spike Video Game Awards 2010 for "Best Character". The 2011 Guinness World Records Gamer's Edition lists Ezio as the 35th most popular video game character. The praise for his portrayal has also placed him high in multiple all-decade or all-time rankings. Ezio was voted as the third top character of the 2000s decade by Game Informer's readers. In 2012, GamesRadar+ ranked him as the eighth "most memorable, influential, and badass" protagonist in games due to his entire life being portrayed. They also placed him second on the list of most badass game characters of the generation, saying "Ezio has become synonymous with the image of the video game assassin."

The character's physical attractiveness and clothing style have also been noted. At the 2010 Spike Video Game Awards, he won the award for "Best Dressed Assassin", while Paste named him as one of the "best costumed characters in videogames." GamesRadar named Ezio "Mister 2009" in their article on the sexiest new characters of the decade of 2000. Furthermore, PlayStation Official Magazine ranked Ezio fifth on their list of "finest facial hair gaming has to offer".

== Bibliography ==
- Bowden, Oliver (2009). Assassin's Creed: Renaissance. Penguin Books Limited. p. 528. ISBN 9780141046303. Archived from the original on 2023-11-07.
- Bowden, Oliver (November 25, 2010). Assassin's Creed: Brotherhood. Penguin UK. p. 544. ISBN 9780141966700.
