= Assassin's Creed: Forgotten Temple =

South Korean webcomic

어쌔신 크리드 - 잊혀진 사원 RR: Eossaesin keurideu - icheojin sawon MR: Ŏssaesin k'ŭridŭ - ich'ŏjin sawŏn
- Genre: Adventure; Fantasy
- Author: ARC; Adaptation: SHYATAN; NOHT; YEON
- Illustrator: Tabii
- Publisher: Redice Studio
- Webtoon service: Naver Webtoon (Korean); Webtoon (English)
- Original run: April 25, 2023 – March 17, 2026
- Volumes: 7

Assassin's Creed: Forgotten Temple (Korean: 어쌔신 크리드 - 잊혀진 사원) is a South Korean manhwa released as a webtoon, written by ARC and illustrated by Tabii. It was serialized on the Webtoon platform from 25 April 2023 to 17 March 2026, running for 151 episodes. SHYATAN, NOHT, and YEON have been responsible for adapting the webtoon into English.

Forgotten Temple is a creative partnership between Webtoon and Ubisoft, and serves a continuation of the story of Edward Kenway, the protagonist of Ubisoft's 2013 video game Assassin's Creed IV: Black Flag. Set primarily in 1725, the plot follows Edward's travels in Southeast Asia, where he crosses paths with new allies and enemies while searching for Pieces of Eden. The story also features modern-day segments centered around Edward's descendant Noa Kim, who discovers more about his family's history as he explores Edward's genetic memories.

== Plot ==
=== Season One ===
Noa Kim, a Korean-American college student, is abducted by Abstergo Industries during a trip to Macau and forced to relive the memories of his ancestor Edward Kenway, an 18th-century Assassin. During his captivity, Noa slowly befriends Dr. Shimazu Sei, who explains to him Abstergo's true nature as a Templar front company and the Templars' long-standing conflict with the Assassins. While Noa becomes interested to learn more about the Assassins in the hopes of understanding his family's history and why his father mysteriously vanished during his childhood, Sei seeks to use Edward's memories to locate a Piece of Eden and ensure the well-being of her own family, the Shimazu clan.

In 1725, Edward travels to Macau after being informed by the Assassins of a potential Precursor site in Southeast Asia. During his investigation, Edward befriends the Dutch navigator John Young and a Chinese laborer named Zhang, after protecting both of them from Shimazu ninja led by the Templar Shimazu Saito. Edward learns that John's late friend Hendrik had found a Piece of Eden in Angkor and documented his search in his sea log, which has been acquired by the businesswoman Madam Lee. After Saito steals Hendrik's sea log, Edward and Madam Lee form an alliance to recover the journal. In the process, Edward defends Madam Lee's company from her rivals Alan Jacob, Jan van Aert, and Master Sun, who are working together to sabotage her.

Edward and Madam Lee's partnership eventually falls through, so the former opts to create his own organization, the Zhang Wei Union. In addition to John and Zhang, he also recruits the pirate captain Rupiya, the Korean engineer Yun Pyeong-Gyu, and the Chinese medic Xialun Qing, and secures a partnership with Jan and the Dutch East India Company. With the Zhang Wei Union firmly established, Edward sets out to recover Hendrik's sea log, which Saito entrusted to Master Sun. While infiltrating Sun's gambling ship, Edward encounters Saito and learns that she has been betrayed by her followers, including her old mentor Fuma Sukuna, who branded her a traitor to the Shimazu clan. Seeking revenge, Saito and Edward form a truce and come into conflict with a group of Chinese Assassins led by their Mentor, Xiao Han, who also seek Angkor's Piece of Eden, so that they could use it to overthrow the Qing Empire. Edward and Saito ultimately lose Hendrik's sea log to Xiao Han, who kills Sun and forms an alliance with Madam Lee and Fuma Sukuna.

In the present, Noa and Sei's attempts to trace Edward's footsteps are hindered by the Zhawang Corporation, the Zhang Wei Union's modern incarnation, which seeks to save Noa from Abstergo's captivity. While in Cebu, Philippines, Noa and Sei are attacked by the Assassin Nathan Zhang, whom the former fights off. However, before leaving, Nathan informs Noa that his father was also an Assassin and abandoned Noa to protect him from the Templars. Noa continues to explore the memories of Edward, who travels to the Philippines alongside his fellow Zhang Wei Union members and Jan van Aert. However, the group is arrested by the Spanish authorities and taken to Manila, due to Jan's alleged involvement in the assassination of Governor Fernando Manuel de Bustillo Bustamante y Rueda. Edward and his allies escape after a monk starts a city-wide riot using a crescent amulet, revealed to be a Piece of Eden.

=== Season Two ===
Edward and Saito try to retrieve the crescent amulet from the monk, but he uses the Piece of Eden's powers against them, causing Edward to begin experiencing strange visions, which inform him of a second sea log hidden by Hendrik in Cebu. Rajah, the leader of a Visayan resistance, kills the monk and takes his amulet, seeking to use the Pieces of Eden to end Spain's colonial rule over the Philippines. Thanks to Jan van Aert distracting the Spanish Navy, the Zhang Wei Union members escape Manila and attempt to sail to Cebu, but an attack by Rajah's rebels leaves them temporarily stranded on Monkey Island. After rescuing several native villagers brainwashed by Rajah with the amulet and destroying his resistance's fort, the crew arrives in Cebu, where Rajah has already retrieved Hendrik's sea log from the Basilica del Santo Niño. While Edward defeats Rajah, Saito recovers the sea log but loses it to Xiao Han, forcing her and Edward to escape with the crescent amulet.

In the present, Abstergo discovers the amulet's location in the shipwreck of the SS Ourang Medan near the Strait of Malacca. Noa is sent to recover the Piece of Eden, but its powers negatively affect him, threatening his life. After the Templars order Noa's termination, Sei makes a deal with Nathan Zhang, who helps the pair and Sei's bodyguard Yuki escape with the amulet. Nathan takes the trio to Singapore, where Sei decides to relive Saito's memories in search of another Piece of Eden that could save Noa.

With Edward corrupted by the crescent amulet, Saito assumes temporary command of the Zhang Wei Union and encounters a group of Japanese mercenaries hired by Fuma Sukuna to hunt her. Saito convinces the mercenaries to join her cause, and they help the Union members kill Sukuna. Afterwards, the crew travels to the Sultanate of Sulu, only to be imprisoned due to a deal made by Jan van Aert with the Sultan, who desires the Piece of Eden in their possession. They escape and try to recover the artifact, but are forced to fight Xiao Han and his Chinese Assassins, who tracked them to Sulu. After Edward hesitates to kill Xiao Han due to a vision of the future, Xiao Han seizes the crescent amulet, inadvertently killing Xialun Qing in the process. The Union members escape Sulu and travel to Singapore to recover from their defeat, where Edward is reunited with his wife Tessa and daughter Jennifer. Tessa consoles Edward after he blames himself for leading his companions astray, and warns him about a Templar plot against him that the Assassins have uncovered. Reinvigorated by the encounter with his family, Edward resumes his quest for the Pieces of Eden, sailing to Burma.

In the present, Sei, Noa, Yuki, and Nathan also travel to Myanmar to recover the Piece of Eden housed in the Shwedagon Pagoda. The artifact tests Sei and Noa by subjecting them to their fears and insecurities, but they prevail; Sei resolves to forge her own path and escape Abstergo's influence, while Noa overcomes his desire to learn the truth about his family's past. After retrieving the Piece of Eden, the group attempts to leave Myanmar by stealing a seaplane from Yangon's harbor, but Abstergo stops them. Yuki sacrifices herself to allow the others to escape, and Sei is captured after using the crescent amulet to subdue the Abstergo forces long enough for Noa and Nathan to flee with the second artifact.

Following their successful retrieval of the second Piece of Eden, Edward and Saito are betrayed by John Young, who reveals himself as a Templar spy. Blaming Edward for Xialun's death and revealing that the Templars have promised him a way to resurrect Xialun using the Pieces of Eden, John steals the second artifact and delivers it to Alan Jacob, the Grand Master of the Templar Order. After a failed attempt by the Zhang Wei Union to capture John and recover the artifact, Jan van Aert saves them from an ambush by Alan's East India Company fleet. Edward agrees to resume his partnership with Jan and recruits additional allies from among Batavia's pirates.

In the present, Noa and Nathan are tracked down by Abstergo, but are saved by a group of Assassins (Note: Although never identified in the webtoon, the Assassins are strongly implied to be Callum Lynch, Lin, and Moussa, characters introduced in the 2016 Assassin's Creed film.) sent by Claire Zhang, Nathan's sister and the Zhawang Corporation's director, as well as members of the DedSec hacking collective, which Nathan has ties to. (Note: DedSec is an organization that originated from the Watch Dogs video game series, where they play a prominent role.) DedSec inform Noa that Sei has been taken to Abstergo's facility in Osaka, Japan, where her genetic memories helped the Templars track down a third Piece of Eden, buried with Saito. Noa rescues Sei and brings her to the Zhawang Corporation's headquarters in Jakarta, Indonesia, where he resumes tracking Edward's memories.

The Zhang Wei Union members and their allies sail to Indochina, reaching the mainland after fighting through both Madam Lee's and Alan Jacob's fleets. They then travel to Angkor to find the Forgotten Temple, which houses the third Piece of Eden, arriving at the same time as their enemies. Detecting intruders, the Temple activates an advanced security system, awakening giant stone guardians and creating a temporal anomaly that begins to merge the 18th and 21st centuries. In the present, the Abstergo forces who have arrived at the Temple are affected by the anomaly, which transforms anyone and anything into their past counterparts. To stop the anomaly from spreading and destroying the world, Noa, Sei, and Nathan travel to the Temple, which turns them into their respective ancestors: Edward, Saito, and John. Nathan, overtaken by John's personality, steals the Piece of Eden in Noa's possession and helps Alan and his men reach the Temple, but ultimately betrays them. Xiao Han, who is carrying the crescent amulet, also reaches the Temple with the help of Madam Lee's forces, who form a truce with the Zhang Wei Union to battle the stone guardians.

After obtaining weapons that can be used to destroy the guardians, Noa/Edward and Sei/Saito enter the Temple, but its systems go haywire as a result of Abstergo's efforts to use the third Piece of Eden to seize control of it. The Temple creates simulations based on Edward's, Saito's, and Xiao Han's pasts, forcing them to battle pirates in the Caribbean, the Shimazu clan in Japan, and a corrupted Xiao Han during the Qing Empire's purge of the Chinese Assassins. Noa and Sei also experience simulations based on their own pasts, which they overcome by facing their regrets. As all parties converge at the Temple's core, a fight breaks out over possession of the Pieces of Eden. Alan Jacob shoots John and seizes all three artifacts, but before he can assemble them, he is killed by the mortally wounded John. Inspired by his friend's sacrifice, Edward persuades Xiao Han and Saito to stand down, convincing them that they do not need the Pieces of Eden and that they can accomplish their goals solely through the support of those who care about them. Noa similarly convinces Sei that together they can achieve the freedom to choose their own paths.

As the Temple shuts down and everything is restored to normal, Edward, Saito, and Xiao Han decide to hide the artifacts to keep them safe, before going their separate ways: Xiao Han dedicates himself to rebuilding his Brotherhood, while Saito goes on to take over the Shimazu clan, and Edward, aware of his fate, (Note: One of the visions experienced by Edward showed his death in 1735, as first depicted in the novel Assassin's Creed: Forsaken.) decides to spend his final years with his family. Before that, he has a conversation with Noa, encouraging his descendant to forge his own story. After declining an invitation to join the Assassins, Noa decides to stay with Sei, Nathan, and Claire, his newfound family, as the group prepares for their next adventure. In the past, Edward returns home to Tessa and Jennifer and meets his newborn son, Haytham Kenway.

== Publication ==
Assassin's Creed: Forgotten Temple was first announced alongside several other Assassin's Creed projects in April 2021. Game Informer reported that the webtoon would expand upon Edward Kenway's story following the events of Assassin's Creed IV: Black Flag and be part of Ubisoft's new collection of 'Chronicles', new adventures featuring familiar characters.

On 12 April 2023, Ubisoft announced its collaboration with Korean art studio Redice Studio, which would be responsible for the publishing of Forgotten Temple. Planned to run for 150 episodes across three seasons, the series' first episode was released on the Webtoon platform on 25 April. It was initially available in English, Korean, French, and Japanese, with more languages being added at a later time. During its runtime, the webtoon's format changed from three seasons of 50 episodes each to two seasons, with season one comprising the first 51 episodes while the remaining episodes were released as part of season two.

=== Print ===
A trade paperback collecting the first seven episodes of Assassin's Creed: Forgotten Temple was published in France by Mana Books on 5 September 2024. An English-language version was released by Viz Media on 18 November 2025. Six additional volumes have since been released in France, with the latest one published on 2 April 2026.

==== Volumes ====
No.	English release date	English ISBN
1	November 18, 2025	978-1974752904
2	February 17, 2026	978-1974762125
3	May 19, 2026	978-1974763252
4	August 18, 2026	978-1974765126
