= Roger Craig Smith =

American voice actor (born 1975)

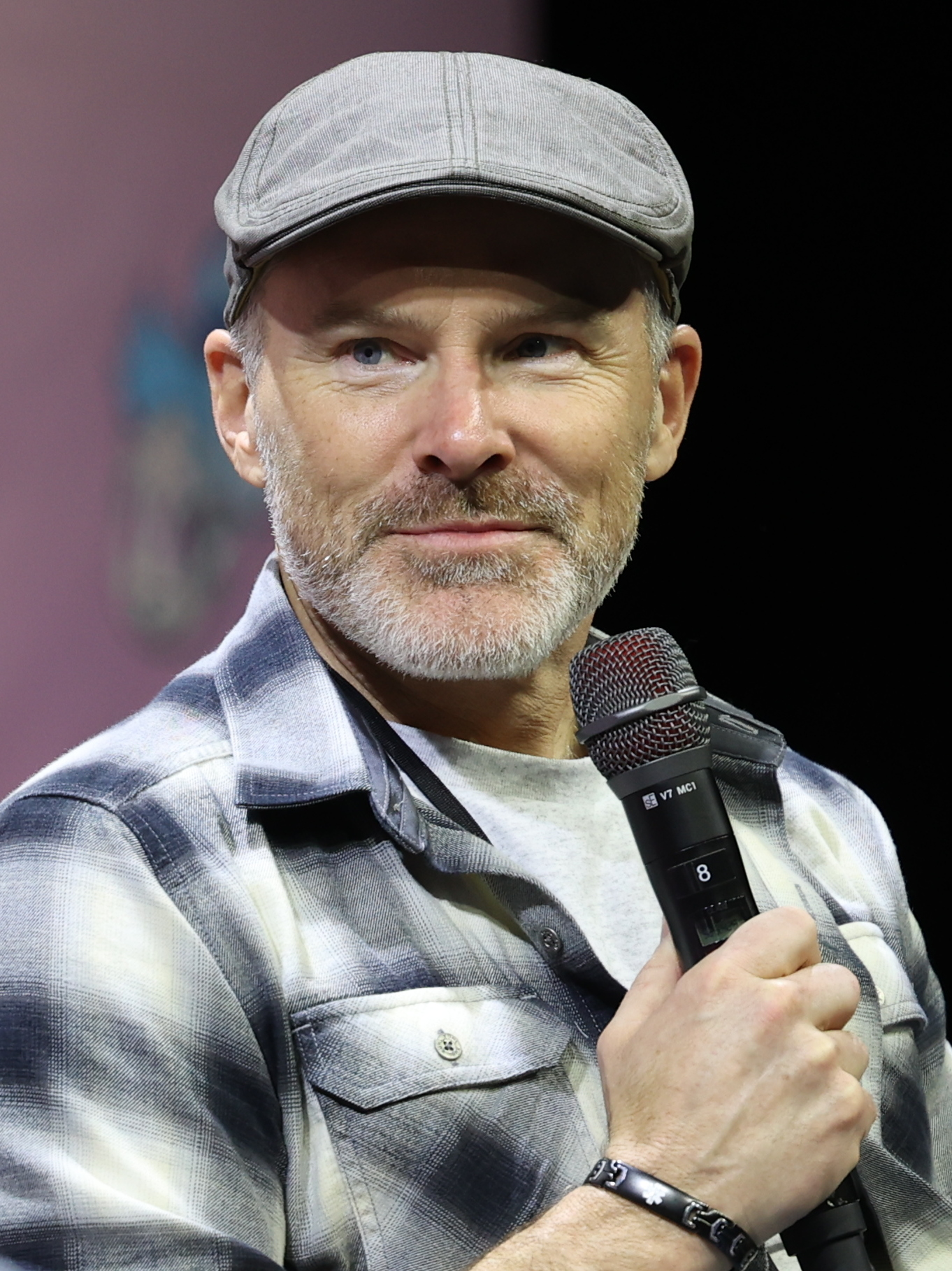
- Smith at the 2025 Animate! Raleigh
- Born: August 11, 1975 (age 51); St. Joseph, Michigan, U.S.
- Education: Chapman University
- Occupation: Voice actor
- Years active: 2004–present
- Website: rogercraigsmith.com

Roger Craig Smith (born August 11, 1975) is an American voice actor. He is known for his voice roles in video games such as Chris Redfield in the Resident Evil series (2009–2017), Ezio Auditore da Firenze in the Assassin's Creed series (2009–2023), Kyle Crane in Dying Light (2015) as well as in Dying Light: The Beast (2025), Sonic the Hedgehog, E-123 Omega, and the Wisp Announcer (among other characters) in the Sonic the Hedgehog series (2010–present), and Mirage in Apex Legends. In addition, he has voiced Captain America in several Marvel projects, and Batman in Batman: Arkham Origins (2013), Batman: Arkham Shadow (2024), and several other DC projects featuring the character. Smith is also known as the voice of Thomas and additional characters on Regular Show.

== Early life, family and education ==
Smith was born on August 11, 1975, in St. Joseph, Michigan, and raised in Tustin, California. He is of Scotch-Irish descent. Smith acted in productions while at non-profit organization MYART in middle school and high school as well as at Foothill High School in Orange County, California.

While he attended nearby Chapman University, he performed stand-up comedy for five years. While studying at Chapman, he hosted a local variety show. He graduated from Chapman University's Dodge College of Film and Media Arts in 2003 with a degree in screenwriting. Thereafter, he left stand-up comedy and begin pursuing voice acting full time in 2005. His stand-up routines also helped him in his approach to his voice acting career.

== Career ==
Smith's voice work has been called upon by companies such as Disney/Disney Television Animation, Cartoon Network, Xbox Game Studios, Sony, Wal-Mart, Baskin-Robbins, E! and TLC.

Since 2007, he has been the narrator for Say Yes to the Dress.

Smith became the third official English voice of the Sega character Sonic the Hedgehog in the video game series of the same name beginning in 2010, replacing Jason Griffith. Outside of the video games, he reprised the role as the character in the animated spin-off television series Sonic Boom, as well as in cameo roles in Wreck-It Ralph and its sequel Ralph Breaks the Internet. In January 2021, he revealed on his Twitter account that he would no longer be voicing the character, which was later retracted in May 2021, when he announced his return to the franchise.

Smith also voices Ezio Auditore da Firenze in the Assassin's Creed series, Chris Redfield in the Resident Evil series, Hawkodile and Richard in Unikitty!, Baron Draxum in the second season of Rise of the Teenage Mutant Ninja Turtles, Captain America / Steve Rogers in several Marvel projects, Deidara in Naruto: Shippuden, Thomas in Regular Show, Shinji Hirako in Bleach, Martin Reest in Monster, Batman / Bruce Wayne in Batman: Arkham Origins, Batman: Arkham Shadow, Batman Ninja, and Superman: Red Son, Kyle Crane in Dying Light, and Mirage in Apex Legends.

== Filmography ==
=== Film ===
List of voice performances in films
Year	Title	Role	Notes	Source
2006	Patlabor: The Movie	Kiichi Goto	Bandai Visual English dub	
2006	Patlabor 2: The Movie	Kiichi Goto	Bandai Visual English dub	
2006	Ghost in the Shell 2: Innocence	Yamadori Transport Pilot	Animaze English dub	
2007	Disney Princess Enchanted Tales: Follow Your Dreams	Prince Phillip	Direct-to-video	
2008	Naruto the Movie: Legend of the Stone of Gelel	Temujin	English dub	
2008	Resident Evil: Degeneration	Curtis Miller	English dub	
2009	Tinker Bell and the Lost Treasure	Bolt, Stone	Direct-to-video	
2009	Jennifer's Body	Radio DJ, ADR Voices		
2010	Assassin's Creed: Ascendance	Ezio Auditore da Firenze	Short film	
2011	Assassin's Creed: Embers	Ezio Auditore da Firenze	Short film	
2012	Wreck-It Ralph	Sonic the Hedgehog	Cameo	
2012	Delhi Safari	Monkeys	English dub	
2013	Planes	Ripslinger		
2014	Road to Ninja: Naruto the Movie	Deidara	English dub	
2014	Iron Man & Captain America: Heroes United	Steve Rogers / Captain America	Direct-to-video	
2015	Batman Unlimited: Animal Instincts	Bruce Wayne / Batman	Direct-to-video	
2015	Regular Show: The Movie	Frank, Jablonski, Fast Food Guy	Television film	
2015	Batman Unlimited: Monster Mayhem	Bruce Wayne / Batman	Direct-to-video	
2015	The Laws of the Universe Part 0	Eisuke	English dub	
2016	Batman Unlimited: Mechs vs. Mutants	Bruce Wayne / Batman	Direct-to-video	
2017	The Star	Chamberlain, Innkeeper		
2017	The Son of Bigfoot	White Rabbit		
2018	Batman Ninja	Bruce Wayne / Batman	English dub Direct-to-video	
2018	Ralph Breaks the Internet	Sonic the Hedgehog	Cameo	
2020	Bigfoot Family	Bigfoot / Dr. Harrison, Arctic Hare, Guard		
2020	Superman: Red Son	Bruce Wayne / Batman	Direct-to-video	
2020	Ben 10 Versus the Universe: The Movie	Diamondhead, Way Big, Steam Smythe	Television film	
2020	DC Showcase: The Phantom Stranger	Ted, Harry	Short film	
2020	Happy Halloween, Scooby-Doo!	Autopilot, Parent	Direct-to-video	
2023	Suzume	Minoru Okabe	English dub	
2023	Ant-Man and the Wasp: Quantumania	Quantumnauts (voice)		
2023	Merry Little Batman	Flashback Cop	Direct-to-streaming	
2023	Trolls Band Together	Rock Climbing Instructor, Lenny, Mount Rageon fan		
2024	Megamind vs. the Doom Syndicate	Metro City Mayor Jody Smelt		
2024	The Imaginary	Snowflake	English dub	
2024	Batman Beyond: Year One	Bruce Wayne / Batman	Uncredited voice role; Fan film	
2024	Thelma the Unicorn	Garyl		

=== Television ===
Year	Title	Role	Notes
2007–present	Say Yes to the Dress	Narrator	
2014–15	Hell's Kitchen	Narrator	Seasons 13–14

=== Animation ===
List of voice performances in animation
Year	Title	Role	Notes	Source
2007	Celebrity Deathmatch	Tobey Maguire	Episode: "Tobey Maguire vs. Jake Gyllenhaal"	
2008–09	Wolverine and the X-Men	Forge, Hellion, Kamal		
2010–11	Robotomy	Tacklebot, Steve		
2010–12	The Avengers: Earth's Mightiest Heroes	Captain Marvel, S.H.I.E.L.D. Agents		
2011–22	Young Justice	Ocean Master / L-5, Rodunn, additional voices		
2011–13	Fish Hooks	Pass, Nigel		
2011–17	Regular Show	Thomas, Low Five Ghost, various characters		
2012–17	Ultimate Spider-Man	Steve Rogers / Captain America, Ghost Spider	11 episodes	
2013	Sofia the First	Luciano	Episode: "The Amulet and the Anthem"	
2013	Lego Marvel Super Heroes: Maximum Overload	Steve Rogers / Captain America	Television special	
2013	Teenage Mutant Ninja Turtles	The Pulverizer, Mutagen Man	3 episodes	
2013–17	Clarence	Belson Noles, Percy, various voices		
2013–19	Avengers Assemble	Steve Rogers / Captain America, Space Phantom, Torgo, Great Gambonnos, Grim Reaper, Radioactive Man, Winter Soldier, Orka, various voices	Main role	
2014	Manly	Skinny-Ripped, Eyes-No-Eyes, Zealots		
2014–15	Hulk and the Agents of S.M.A.S.H.	Steve Rogers / Captain America	4 episodes	
2014–16	Transformers: Rescue Bots	Taylor		
2014–17	Sonic Boom	Sonic the Hedgehog, Dave the Intern, various characters	Main role	
2015	Lego Marvel Super Heroes: Avengers Reassembled	Steve Rogers / Captain America	Television special	
2015–16	Pickle and Peanut	PAL-SCAN, MC, Klaus		
2015–17	Transformers: Robots in Disguise	Jetstorm, Slipstream, Airazor, Scoutmaster, Soldier Mini-Cons, Blastwave		
2015–17	Be Cool, Scooby-Doo!	Gus, Jasper, Announcer, Chet		
2015–21	If You Give a Mouse a Cookie	Mouse, Moose		
2016	Breadwinners	Kenneth / Buhduece's Booty, Muscle Bread		
2016	Future-Worm!	Sauce Starbolt		
2016	Uncle Grandpa	Belson Noles	Episode: "Pizza Eve"	
2016–17	The Powerpuff Girls	Schedulebot, Toni, Zack, various voices		
2016–21	Ben 10	Diamondhead, Forever Knight, Steam Smythe, various voices		
2017	Penn Zero: Part-Time Hero	Hideo	Episode: "Ninki Ninja Fight Town"	
2017	Justice League Action	Mister Miracle	Episode: "It'll Take a Miracle!"	
2017–18	Guardians of the Galaxy	Steve Rogers / Captain America, Diviak, Gor-Kain's Father	3 episodes	
2017–19	Star vs. the Forces of Evil	Sir Stabby, Baby Man, Sir Dashing, additional voices		
2017–20	Unikitty!	Hawkodile, Richard	Main role	
2018–20	Harvey Street Kids	Pinkeye, Bobby the Elder, Billy the Skunk, various voices		
2018–20	Rise of the Teenage Mutant Ninja Turtles	Baron Draxum, additional voices	Season 2 only (as Draxum); 11 episodes	
2018–20	Spider-Man	Steve Rogers / Captain America, Douglas, Don the School Guard	5 episodes	
2018–present	Marvel Rising	Steve Rogers / Captain America, Wilson, Karl		
2018–present	Big City Greens	American Rat, Splish Vendor, additional voices		
2018	Apple & Onion	Ice Cream, Conductor, Construction Guy, Cat, Crumpled Cola, Chocolate Chip Cookie, Bacon, Marshmallow, Tap Water, Donut, Coffee		
2018	Lego Marvel Super Heroes: Black Panther – Trouble in Wakanda	Steve Rogers / Captain America	Short film	
2018	The Adventures of Kid Danger	Randy, Butt Head Man	Episode: "Magical Beefery Tour"	
2019	The Adventures of Rocky and Bullwinkle	Agent Chad	Episode: "See You Laser, Alligaser" or "Goop! There it is"	
2019	American Dad!	Guy Fieri	Episode: "Flavortown"	
2019	OK K.O.! Let's Be Heroes	Sonic the Hedgehog	Episode: "Let's Meet Sonic"	
2019	Carmen Sandiego	Moose Boy	Episode: "The Stockholm Syndrome Caper"	
2019, 2025	Love, Death & Robots	Sam, Cap, Coombs	2 episodes	
2020–21	The Owl House	Warden Wrath, Jacob Hopkins	6 episodes	
2020–21	Amphibia	Tarantulad, Rodney McDonald, Blair the Balloonist, Additional Voices		
2020–22	DreamWorks Dragons: Rescue Riders	Chillbert		
2021–22	He-Man and the Masters of the Universe	Kronis / Trap Jaw		
2021	Arcane	Claggor		
2021	Jurassic World Camp Cretaceous	B.R.A.D., B.R.A.D.-X, Emergency Announcer, Park Worker, Scientist	Season 4	
2021	Kid Cosmic	R.B-O.T, Battle Warrior	Episode: "Kid Cosmic and the Galactic Champion"	
2021	Looney Tunes Cartoons	Longboy, Machine	2 episodes	
2022	Inside Job	Keanu Reeves	Season 2	
2023, 2025	Transformers: EarthSpark	3 episodes		
2023	Velma	Stoner	Episode: "The Candy (Wo)man"	
2023	Lego Marvel Avengers: Code Red	Captain America, Red Ghost, Brother, Bystander	Disney+ television special	
2024	Twilight of the Gods	Bjorn	2 episodes	
2024	Lego Marvel Avengers: Mission Demolition	Captain America, The Thing, The Punisher	Disney+ television special	
2024	Megamind Rules!	Jody Smelt		
2025	Your Friendly Neighborhood Spider-Man	Chameleon, Speed Demon, Phil Grayfield	Disney+ series	
2025	Lego Marvel Avengers: Strange Tails	Steve Rogers / Captain America, Attuma	Disney+ television special	
2026–present	Regular Show: The Lost Tapes	Various characters		

=== Anime ===
List of voice performances in animation
Year	Title	Role	Notes	Source
2005	Duel Masters	Prince Maurice the Merciless		
2005–06	Naruto	Idate Morino, Inabi Uchiha, Kota, Raiga Kurosuki, Shura		
2006	Zegapain	Kyo Sogoru, Abyss	As Bill Lemas	
2006–14	Bleach	Shinji Hirako, Ryusei Kenzaki / Kenryu		
2008–09	Code Geass	Gilbert G.P. Guilford, Otaku		
2009–10	Monster	Martin Reest		
2009–16	Naruto: Shippuden	Deidara, Bisuke, Dan Katō, Hayama Shirakumo		
2010	Kurokami: The Animation	Seiji		
2010	Kekkaishi	Byaku		
2011	Marvel Anime: Iron Man	Professor Satoshi Yamaguchi, Kawashima, Taurus	Eps. 3–4	
2011	Marvel Anime: Wolverine	Agent Machida		
2018	Kabaneri of the Iron Fortress	Biba Amatori		
2018	Aggretsuko	Manumaru		
2020	Marvel Future Avengers	Steve Rogers / Captain America, Visco		
2020–22	Ghost in the Shell: SAC_2045	John Smith, Otomo's Security		
2022–23	ULTRAMAN	Kotaro Higashi / Ultraman Taro		

=== Video games ===
List of voice performances in video games
Year	Title	Role	Notes	Source
2004	Castle Shikigami 2	Kim De John		
2006	Disney's Chicken Little: Ace in Action	Runt		
2006	Blazing Angels: Squadrons of WWII	Player		
2006	Metal Gear Solid: Portable Ops	Soviet Soldiers, Intercom	English dub	
2007	300: March to Glory	Stelios, Arcadians		
2007	Medal of Honor: Vanguard	PFC 1st Class Harrison Pike		
2007	Digimon World Data Squad	ShineGreymon, Tsukasa Kagura, DemiDevimon		
2007	Soulcalibur Legends	Siegfried Schtauffen	English dub	
2008	Metal Gear Solid 4: Guns of the Patriots	Enemy Soldiers	English dub	
2008	Too Human	Aspel, Davin, Second Wolf, Male Civilian #1		
2008	Naruto: Clash of Ninja Revolution 2	Towa, Bando	English dub	
2008	Soulcalibur IV	Siegfried Schtauffen	Uncredited; English dub	
2008	Valkyria Chronicles	Alex Raymond, Ted Ustinov, Vyse Inglebard	English dub	
2008	CSI: New York: The Game	Gus Van Lars, Tom King		
2009	G.I. Joe: The Rise of Cobra	Duke, Lift-Ticket		
2009	Terminator Salvation	Resistance Soldiers		
2009	MadWorld	George		
2009	Assassin's Creed II	Ezio Auditore da Firenze		
2009	Final Fantasy XIII	Cocoon Inhabitants	English dub	
2009	Resident Evil 5	Chris Redfield		
2009	Naruto Shippuden: Ultimate Ninja 4	Deidara	English dub	
2009	Soulcalibur: Broken Destiny	Siegfried Schtauffen	Uncredited; English dub	
2009	Naruto Shippuden: Legends Akatsuki Rising	Deidara	English dub	
2009	Naruto Shippuden: Clash of Ninja Revolution 3	Deidara, Bando, Towa	English dub	
2009	Resident Evil: The Darkside Chronicles	Chris Redfield		
2010	Alice in Wonderland	March Hare		
2010	Dead to Rights: Retribution	Temple, EMT		
2010	Naruto Shippuden: Ultimate Ninja Heroes 3	Deidara, Doshin	English dub	
2010	Metal Gear Solid: Peace Walker	Soldiers	English dub	
2010	Red Dead Redemption	The Local Population		
2010	Assassin's Creed: Brotherhood	Ezio Auditore da Firenze		
2010	Supreme Commander 2	Seargent Daxil		
2010	Naruto Shippuden: Ultimate Ninja Storm 2	Deidara	English dub	
2010	Sonic Free Riders	Sonic the Hedgehog		
2010	Kinect Adventures!	Rob		
2010	Sonic Colors	Sonic the Hedgehog, Wisp Announcer	English dub	
2010	Naruto Shippuden: Dragon Blade Chronicles	Deidara	English dub	
2010	Tangled: The Video Game	Axel		
2011	Marvel vs. Capcom 3: Fate of Two Worlds	Chris Redfield	Also Ultimate Marvel vs. Capcom 3	
2011	PlayStation Move Heroes	Gleeber		
2011	Ace Combat: Assault Horizon	Sensor Operator		
2011	Assassin's Creed: Revelations	Ezio Auditore da Firenze		
2011	Kinect: Disneyland Adventures	Golden Ticket		
2011	Resident Evil: The Mercenaries 3D	Chris Redfield		
2011	Naruto Shippuden: Ultimate Ninja Impact	Deidara	English dub	
2011	Sonic Generations	Sonic the Hedgehog, Wisp Announcer	English dub	
2011	Mario & Sonic at the London 2012 Olympic Games	Sonic the Hedgehog, Wisp Announcer	English dub	
2012	Avengers Initiative	Zzzax, Captain America		
2012	Armored Core V	Men of Honor Unit C, Zodiac No. 2, AC Pilot	English dub	
2012	Resident Evil: Revelations	Chris Redfield	Uncredited; English dub	
2012	Marvel Avengers: Battle for Earth	Captain America, Venom, Human Torch, Pitt'o Nili		
2012	Sonic & All-Stars Racing Transformed	Sonic the Hedgehog		
2012	Soulcalibur V	Siegfried Schtauffen, Ezio Auditore da Frirenze	Uncredited (Siegfried only); English dub	
2012	Naruto Shippuden: Ultimate Ninja Storms Generations	Deidara	English dub	
2012	Kinect Rush: A Disney-Pixar Adventure	Francesco Bernoulli		
2012	Resident Evil 6	Chris Redfield		
2013	Naruto Shippuden: Ultimate Ninja Storm 3	Deidara	English dub	
2013	Planes: The Video Game	Ripslinger		
2013	Skylanders: Swap Force	Boom Jet		
2013	Lego Marvel Super Heroes	Captain America, Human Torch		
2013	Disney Infinity	Francesco Bernoulli		
2013	The Wonderful 101	Wonder-Blue	English dub	
2013	Batman: Arkham Origins	Bruce Wayne / Batman		
2013	Batman: Arkham Origins Blackgate	Bruce Wayne / Batman		
2013	Sonic Lost World	Sonic the Hedgehog, Wisp Announcer	English dub	
2013	Assassin's Creed IV: Black Flag	Ruggiero Ferraro, Abstergo Market Analyst		
2013	Mario & Sonic at the Sochi 2014 Olympic Winter Games	Sonic the Hedgehog	English dub	
2014	Super Smash Bros. for Nintendo 3DS / Wii U	Sonic the Hedgehog	English dub, archive audio	
2014	Disney Infinity: Marvel Super Heroes	Captain America, Francesco Bernoulli		
2014	Naruto Shippuden: Ultimate Ninja Storm Revolution	Deidara	English dub	
2014	Captain America: The Winter Soldier – The Official Game	Captain America, Winter Soldier, Taskmaster		
2014	Skylanders: Trap Team	Bushwack		
2014	Lego Batman 3: Beyond Gotham	Bat-Mite, The Riddler, Skeets		
2014	Sonic Boom: Shattered Crystal	Sonic the Hedgehog	English dub	
2014	Sonic Boom: Rise of Lyric	Sonic the Hedgehog	English dub	
2014	Lego Ninjago: Nindroids	Cole		
2015	Dying Light	Kyle Crane		
2015	Resident Evil: Revelations 2	Chris Redfield	Uncredited; Raid Mode	
2015	Disney Infinity 3.0	Captain America, Francesco Bernoulli		
2015	Skylanders: SuperChargers	Bushwack		
2015–2017	Lego Dimensions	Sonic the Hedgehog		
2016	Master of Orion: Conquer the Stars	Sakkra Advisor		
2016	Lego Marvel's Avengers	Daredevil		
2016	Naruto Shippuden: Ultimate Ninja Storm 4	Deidara	English dub	
2016	Assassin's Creed: Identity	Ezio Auditore da Firenze		
2016	Final Fantasy XV	Additional Voices	English dub	
2016	Mario & Sonic at the Rio 2016 Olympic Games	Sonic the Hedgehog	English dub	
2016	Sonic Boom: Fire & Ice	Sonic the Hedgehog	English dub	
2017	Marvel vs. Capcom: Infinite	Chris Redfield		
2017	Sonic Forces	Sonic the Hedgehog, Wisp Announcer		
2017	Ben 10	Diamondhead		
2017	Star Wars: Battlefront II	Kylo Ren		
2017	Super Smash Heroes	Yuuki Minato / Lion Heart	English dub	
2018	Lego DC Super-Villains	B'Dg, Mister Miracle, Skeets, Orion		
2018	Lego The Incredibles	Gazerbeam		
2018	Naruto Shippuden: Shinobi Striker	Deidara, Avatar	English dub	
2018	Marvel Powers United VR	Captain America, Hydra Soldier		
2018	Spyro Reignited Trilogy	Satyrs		
2018	Darksiders III	Angel Soldier, Human		
2018	Super Smash Bros. Ultimate	Sonic the Hedgehog	English dub, archive audio	
2019	Kingdom Hearts III	Corporal, CDA Officers, Trailer House Boy		
2019	Apex Legends	Mirage		
2019	Crash Team Racing Nitro-Fueled	Chick Gizzard Lips		
2019	Remnant: From the Ashes	Mad Merchant		
2019	Team Sonic Racing	Sonic the Hedgehog, E-123 Omega, Wisp Announcer		
2019	The Outer Worlds	Graham Bryant		
2019	Mario & Sonic at the Olympic Games Tokyo 2020	Sonic the Hedgehog	English dub	
2020	Crash Bandicoot 4: It's About Time	Doctor Nitrus Brio, TV Announcer		
2020	Sonic at the Olympic Games – Tokyo 2020	Sonic the Hedgehog	Mobile game English dub	
2020	Yakuza: Like a Dragon	Daigo Dojima	English dub	
2020	Bugsnax	Snorpy Fizzlebean		
2020	Assassin's Creed: Valhalla	Ezio Auditore da Firenze	Cameo; archive audio	
2020	Puyo Puyo Tetris 2	Sonic the Hedgehog	English dub	
2021	Psychonauts 2	Germ Foreman, Froggy Flipper, Lazy Germ, Onion, Alligator Magnet, Fisher King, Shakespeare, Turtle Cop, Motherlobe Worker		
2021	Sonic Colors: Ultimate	Sonic the Hedgehog, Wisp Announcer	English dub	
2022	Sonic Frontiers	Sonic the Hedgehog	English dub	
2022	Star Ocean: The Divine Force	Additional voices		
2022	Grounded	Director Dalton Schmector		
2023	Hi-Fi Rush	Kale Vandelay, SEB-AAA		
2023	Sonic Dream Team	Sonic the Hedgehog	Mobile game; English dub	
2023	Teenage Mutant Ninja Turtles: Splintered Fate	Raphael		
2023	Assassin's Creed Nexus VR	Ezio Auditore da Firenze		
2024	Call of Duty: Black Ops 6	Raphael	Tracer Pack: Teenage Mutant Ninja Turtles: Raphael Bundle	
2024	Batman: Arkham Shadow	Bruce Wayne / Batman, Matches Malone, The Grey Ghost		
2024	Shadow Generations	Sonic the Hedgehog, E-123 Omega	English dub	
2024	Helldivers 2	Mission Control		
2025	Rusty Rabbit	Ray Parker	English dub	
2025	Date Everything!	Tony		
2025	Dying Light: The Beast	Kyle Crane		
2025	Sonic Racing: CrossWorlds	Sonic the Hedgehog, E-123 Omega	English dub	
2026	Yakuza Kiwami 3 & Dark Ties	Daigo Dojima		
2026	Teenage Mutant Ninja Turtles: Empire City	Raphael		
2026	Sonic the Hedgehog (pinball)	Sonic the Hedgehog	Arcade pinball machine	
2026	Phantom Blade Zero	Soul	English dub	

=== Web ===
List of voice performances in web series
Year	Title	Role	Notes	Source
2015	Batman Unlimited	Bruce Wayne / Batman		
2021	Sonic Colors: Rise of The Wisps	Sonic the Hedgehog	English dub	
2022	Woody Woodpecker	Fella Furetti		
2022–present	TailsTube	Sonic the Hedgehog, E-123 Omega	English dub	
2024	Sonic x Shadow Generations: Dark Beginnings	E-123 Omega, Abraham Tower	English dub	

=== Commercial ===
List of voice and dubbing performances in commercials
Year	Title	Role	Notes	Source
2026	Magic: The Gathering	Raphael		

=== Audio drama ===
List of voice and dubbing performances in audio dramas
Year	Title	Role	Notes	Source
2026	Sonic the Hedgehog Presents: The Chaotix Casefiles	Sonic the Hedgehog, Commander Tower, additional voices		

=== Theme parks ===
List of voice performances in theme parks
Year	Title	Role	Notes
2010	Sonic Spinball	Sonic the Hedgehog	
2024	Country Bear Musical Jamboree	Melvin the Moose	
