= Assassin's Creed: Ascendance =

- Directed by: Laurent Bernier; Ghislain Ouellet
- Screenplay by: Ethan Petty
- Story by: Jean Guesdon; Ethan Petty; Louis-Pierre Pharand; Jeffrey Yohalem
- Produced by: Yves Guillemot; Serge Hascoet; Yannis Mallat; Louis-Pierre Pharand; Sébastien Puel; Jean-Jacques Tremblay
- Music by: Jesper Kyd; Inon Zur
- Production company: Ubisoft Montreal
- Distributed by: Ubisoft
- Release date: 16 November 2010
- Running time: 8 minutes
- Country: Canada
- Language: English

Assassin's Creed: Ascendance, originally named Secret Project Number Three, is an animated short film created by UbiWorkshop and Ubisoft Montreal, which bridges the gap between Assassin's Creed II and Assassin's Creed: Brotherhood. It was revealed by UbiWorkshop on November 10, 2010, and released on November 16 for Xbox Live, PlayStation Store and iTunes Store.

== Plot ==
Set during the events of Assassin's Creed: Brotherhood, the film opens with Ezio Auditore da Firenze assassinating the Templar Octavian de Valois to rescue Pantasilea Baglioni. Later, Ezio meets with a hooded figure in the streets of Rome to gather intel about his next target, Cesare Borgia, Captain General of the Papal Army and leader of the Italian Templars.

The hooded figure begins to narrate Cesare's rise to power, beginning in 1497. After his brother Juan was appointed Captain General, Cesare, at the time a simple cardinal, orchestrated his murder by a courtesan so he could take his place. Subsequently, Cesare began a campaign to conquer Romagna, with Ramiro d'Orco, Oliverotto da Fermo and Vitellozzo Vitelli leading his armies. However, in the midst of their conquest, several of his subjects began to rebel against him. In response, Cesare had Ramiro beheaded and framed his other generals.

Fearing that Cesare no longer needed their services and would execute them next, Oliverotto and Vitellozzo conspired against him. In 1502, they orchestrated a rebellion and managed to take over several of Cesare's lands. In response, the Captain General invited them to dinner, where he promised to welcome them back into his service and forgive all of their misdeeds. However, after dinner, Cesare had his executioner Micheletto Corella kill both Oliverotto and Vitellozzo, cementing his reputation as a conniving and ruthless leader.

As the hooded man finishes his story, Ezio vows to kill Cesare and bring an end to his tyranny. After handing Ezio a scroll, the hooded figure heads to Castel Sant'Angelo, where he is revealed to be Leonardo da Vinci. Cesare greets Leonardo and tells him to return to work building war machines for his army. Meanwhile, Ezio declares that he will liberate Rome from Cesare's grasp, setting the stage for the events of Brotherhood.

== Voice cast ==
- Arthur Holden as Octavian de Valois
- Roger Craig Smith as Ezio Auditore da Firenze
- Carlos Ferro as Leonardo da Vinci
- Harry Standjofski as Juan Borgia and Oliverotto da Fermo
- Andreas Apergis as Cesare Borgia

== Development ==
The film's art style was intended to be a balance between what the animators were comfortable with and the traditional oil-paint style iconic to the Renaissance era. Additionally, the creators wished for the film to be familiar to fans of the series. To achieve this, they used sound effects and backgrounds taken directly from Assassin's Creed: Brotherhood and later implemented into Assassin's Creed: Project Legacy.
