= Edward Kenway =

Assassin's Creed character

- Assassin's Creed character
- First appearance: Assassin's Creed: Forsaken (2012)
- First game: Assassin's Creed IV: Black Flag (2013)
- Last appearance: Assassin's Creed Black Flag Resynced (2026)
- Created by: Ubisoft
- Adapted by: Oliver Bowden
- Portrayed by: Matt Ryan

In-universe information
- Occupation: Pirate
- Family: Bernard Kenway (father); Linette Kenway (mother)
- Spouses: Caroline Scott-Kenway (first wife); Tessa Kenway (second wife)
- Children: Jennifer Scott (daughter); Haytham Kenway (son)
- Relatives: Ratonhnhaké:ton / Connor (grandson); Io:nhiòte (great-granddaughter); Unnamed great-granddaughter Unnamed great-grandson William Miles (descendant); Desmond Miles (descendant); Elijah (descendant); Victor Flores Castillo (descendant); Noa Kim (descendant)
- Origin: Swansea, Wales
- Nationality: Welsh

Edward James Kenway is a fictional character in Ubisoft's Assassin's Creed video game franchise. He was introduced as a supporting character in Assassin's Creed: Forsaken, a companion novel to the 2012 video game Assassin's Creed III, before appearing as the protagonist of the 2013 video game, Assassin's Creed IV: Black Flag, and its novelization, Assassin's Creed: Black Flag. In the former, he is portrayed by Welsh actor Matt Ryan through performance capture. Since Black Flag's release, the character has made further appearances in several other works within the franchise.

Within the series' alternate historical setting, Edward was born in 1693 from an English father and a Welsh mother into a family of farmers, but his ambitions to improve his lifestyle eventually lead him to become a privateer and later a pirate, operating in the Caribbean during the final decades of the Golden Age of Piracy. During this time, he plays an important role in the establishment of a short-lived Pirate Republic, and inadvertently becomes caught in the conflict between the Assassin Brotherhood (inspired by the real-life Order of Assassins) and the Templar Order (inspired by the Knights Templar military order). Initially helping both sides for personal gain, he eventually has a change of heart and joins the Assassins following his retirement from piracy. Later in life, he settles down in London, becoming one of the co-leaders of the local branch of the Brotherhood, until his murder by the Templars in 1735. Edward is the father of Haytham Kenway, who would go on to become a high-ranking Templar and the main antagonist of Assassin's Creed III; the grandfather of Ratonhnhaké꞉ton / Connor, Haytham's son and the protagonist of Assassin's Creed III; and an ancestor of Desmond Miles, the protagonist of the modern-day sequences of the first five main games in the series.

Edward has received a positive reception for his charm and characterization as a morally ambiguous protagonist and self-made man and is considered to be one of the series' most popular characters. Various merchandise for the character, as with other of the series' protagonists, has been released.

== Creation and development ==
The lead scriptwriter for Black Flag, Darby McDevitt, observed that previous series protagonists have joined the Assassin Brotherhood without much deliberation, often as part of a coming of age moment, as their personal goals are already naturally aligned with that of the organization's. For Black Flag, the developmental team wanted to explore the Assassins' tenets, their "creed", from a new perspective. The idea of a talented and shrewd pirate, a cynical and jaded man who comes into contact with the Assassins, was mooted and proposed as the protagonist who presents this different point of view and who may not share the Assassins' worldview or adherence to a higher purpose or ideal. The whole thrust of the story then became a constant conflict within Edward over the very idea of the Creed, even as he co-opts some of the Assassins' methods and tactics for his personal gain.

McDevitt explained that Black Flag is at its core a story of immorality and repentance, and Edward Kenway is a married man whose strained relationship with his wife is one of the central struggles in the game. McDewitt describe Edward as a "raucous and bawdy chap" who also has a few significant close relationships with other women in the story, and that his primary motivation in Black Flag is to get rich and prove himself a "man of quality' to his family and betters". As for his personality, McDevitt said Edward "is a pirate who yearns for freedom much like the Assassins do, but loathes the sense of responsibility that a truly functional freedom requires" and that the narrative intends to explore "at what point would Edward realize his brand of freedom is too chaotic to function for very long.” McDevitt compared Edward to his grandson Ratonhnhaké꞉ton, better known as Connor, the protagonist of Black Flag's antecedent Assassin's Creed III, and described his character arc as a counterpoint in someway.

=== Portrayal ===
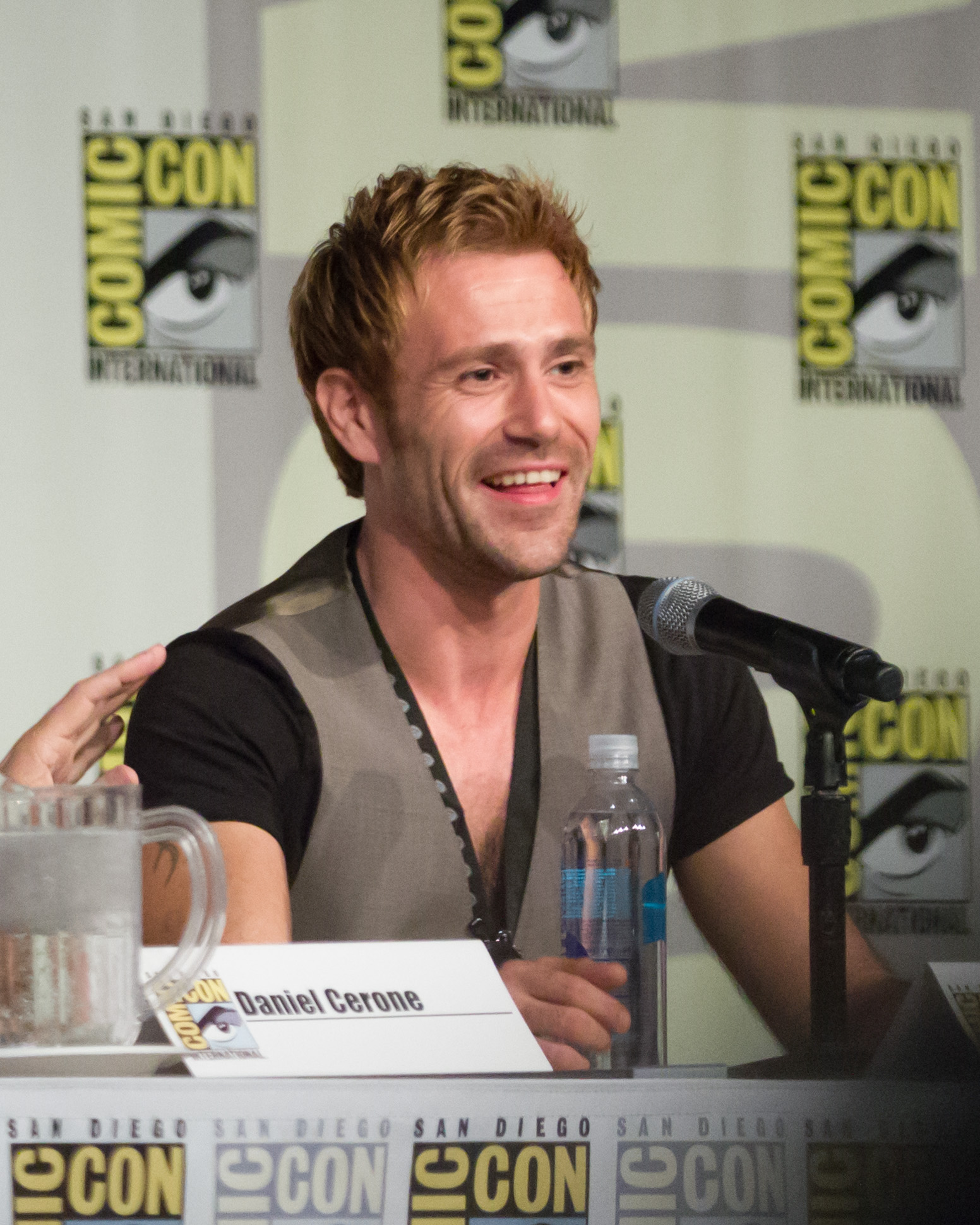
Matt Ryan provided the voice and likeness for Edward Kenway

Edward Kenway is voiced by Matt Ryan, who also portrayed the character in a motion capture studio. McDevitt admitted that the character and his back story became far more influenced by the culture of Wales than he had originally intended; the developmental team only decided to build their story around a Welsh pirate when they cast Ryan as the voice and image of the character. McDevitt originally envisioned Edward to hail from an English port town like Bristol, Portsmouth, or Manchester, but deliberately left his background blank prior to the finalization of the casting process because he wanted to draw from whichever actor was chosen. McDevitt praised Ryan for the charisma and the personality he brought to the character, but recalled that he initially read his lines in a West Country accent. Ryan was then asked to speak in his natural Welsh accent, which ultimately prompted McDevitt to finalize Edward as a Welsh character from Swansea, which matches his actor's cultural background. McDevitt consulted Ryan's father for ideas as he wanted to include some colloquial Welsh phrases into the game's dialogue.

Ryan noted that unlike the majority of the game's cast of characters who are fictionalized versions of historical figures, Edward is an original character. To prepare for the role, Ryan was asked to read books recommended by McDevitt as part of their research of the time period, as the game's developmental team wanted to avoid the usual tropes and archetypes associated with the depiction of piracy in popular fiction.

Unlike various pirates, Edward is shown to be a fairly reasonable man. He has various acts of kindness shown throughout the game, hinting at a softer side, which is fully revealed at the end of the game when he meets his daughter Jennifer Scott.

== Appearances ==
=== Assassin's Creed IV: Black Flag ===
In Assassin's Creed IV: Black Flag, and its 2026 remake, the player experiences Edward's life and exploits in the West Indies and the western African coast as part of a simulation played by a silent protagonist who works as a research analyst at Abstergo Entertainment, a corporate front of the Templar Order in the modern era. Abstergo is interested in Edward's memories because of his involvement with both Assassins and Templars during the Golden Age of Piracy, as well as his pursuit of the Observatory, an ancient site built by the First Civilization.

Edward Kenway's flag after becoming a pirate.

The game's backstory establishes that Edward comes from a low socio-economic background and married a wealthy girl named Caroline Scott, though their relationship became strained over time due to Edward's ambitious dreams of earning a fortune as a privateer. After Caroline eventually lost faith in him and left, Edward decided to pursue his dream and traveled to the Caribbean, where he quickly turned to piracy. He also befriended a number of fellow pirates including Stede Bonnet, Blackbeard, Benjamin Hornigold, Charles Vane and Mary Read, and helped them establish an independent Pirate Republic in Nassau.

In 1715, Edward inadvertently becomes caught in the Assassin-Templar conflict after killing a rogue Assassin, Duncan Walpole, who planned to defect to the Templars. Impersonating Walpole, Edward attends a Templar meeting in Havana, where he learns that the Caribbean Templars, led by Laureano de Torres y Ayala, seek the Observatory, which will allow them to rule the world from the shadows. Mistakenly believing the Observatory to be housing a vast treasure, Edward decides to seek out Bartholomew Roberts, the only man who knows its location. During his search, Edward is introduced to the Assassins by Mary, revealed to be an Assassin herself, who tries to push Edward to abandon his selfish ways and join the Brotherhood. He also witnesses the collapse of the Pirate Republic due to an ideological split between its leaders, and the deaths of most of his friends over the following years.

Edward Kenway's Jolly Roger after joining the Assassins

Edward eventually secures an alliance with Roberts, who takes him to the Observatory, revealed to be a surveillance facility. However, Roberts then betrays Edward and turns him over to the British authorities, who imprison him in Kingston, Jamaica. Edward escapes with the help of Ah Tabai, the Assassin Mentor, and has a change of heart after witnessing Mary's death, deciding to join the Assassins in her honor. After assassinating Roberts and the Templars to prevent them from misusing the Observatory, Edward receives a letter informing him of Caroline's passing and the existence of his hitherto unknown daughter, Jennifer Scott. Wishing to make amends for his past actions, Edward retires from piracy in order to focus on his new Assassin duties and raising Jennifer, and returns to England. Years later, he fathers a son, Haytham Kenway, with his second wife, Tessa, and becomes a leader of the British Brotherhood based in London.

=== Assassin's Creed: Forgotten Temple ===
Edward is the protagonist of Assassin's Creed: Forgotten Temple, a webtoon which follows his exploits in Southeast Asia a few years after the events of Black Flag and ran from April 2023 to March 2026. After being informed by the Assassins about potential First Civilization ruins in Asia, Edward travels to Macau in 1725 to search for additional leads and locate the ruins before the Templars. In the process, he makes a number of new allies, including John Young, a navigator working for the Dutch East India Company, and Shimazu Saito, a samurai and Japanese Templar also tasked with finding the ruins. Initially clashing with Saito over their pursuit of the same prize, Edward eventually forms a truce with her after she is abandoned by her clan and branded a traitor. These allies assist Edward in his search and help him establish a trade organization called the Zhang Wei Union.

After learning that there are three Pieces of Eden spread across Southeast Asia, which will grant immense power if brought together, Edward and his companions embark on a quest to find the artifacts before those seeking to exploit their power. Their opponents include British Templars led by Grand Master Alan Jacob, and a group of Chinese Assassins led by their Mentor, Xiao Han, who seek to rebuild their Brotherhood after it was purged by the Qing Empire. The Zhang Wei Union members' journey takes them to the Philippines, where they secure the first Piece of Eden after defeating Rajah, the leader of a native resistance opposing Spain's colonial rule. However, the artifact's powers prove to have a negative effect on Edward, who begins experiencing strange visions, including some showing future events. After being betrayed by their ally Jan van Aert, the Union members are imprisoned in the Sultanate of Sulu. They manage to escape, but lose their Piece of Eden to Xiao Han, who inadvertently kills John's fiancée, Xialun Qing.

While recovering in Singapore, Edward is reunited with his wife Tessa and daughter Jennifer, who came to warn him about a Templar spy among his inner circle. After retrieving the second Piece of Eden from the Shwedagon Pagoda in Burma, Edward is betrayed by John, who steals the artifact and reveals himself as the spy, claiming the Templars have promised him a way to resurrect Xialun using the Pieces of Eden. While attempting to recover the Piece of Eden from the Templars, the Zhang Wei Union members are led into an ambush but are saved by Jan van Aert. Edward subsequently decides to resume his partnership with Jan and recruits additional allies from among Batavia's pirates, assembling a large fleet. This fleet helps Edward reach Indochina, fighting through a naval blockade set up by the Templars and the Chinese Assassins' ally, Madam Lee.

As the Zhang Wei Union members, the Chinese Assassins, and the Templars all converge at the Forgotten Temple, a First Civilization site in Angkor, the Temple activates an advanced security protocol, awakening giant stone guardians and creating a temporal anomaly that begins to merge the 18th and 21st centuries. As a result, Edward's consciousness is merged with that of his descendant, Noa Kim, who has been reliving his memories in the present. The Union members and Madam Lee's forces form a truce to fight the stone guardians, and Edward and Saito obtain weapons that can be used to destroy the statues. Edward also runs into John, who has betrayed the Templars, and attempts to make amends with his friend, but John remains set on his goal of resurrecting Xialun.

Inside the Temple, Edward and the others are subjected to simulations based on their pasts, which they are able to overcome. After all parties reach the Temple's core, where the third Piece of Eden is housed, a fight breaks out over possession of the artifacts. Alan Jacob shoots John and seizes all three Pieces of Eden, but is killed moments later by the mortally wounded John. Inspired by his friend's sacrifice, Edward persuades Saito and Xiao Han to end their fight, convincing them that they do not need the Pieces of Eden and that they can accomplish their goals solely through the support of those who care about them. The Temple shuts down, and Edward, Saito, and Xiao Han decide to split the Pieces of Eden to keep them safe before going their separate ways. Edward returns the artifact taken from the Shwedagon Pagoda and has a conversation with Noa across time. Due to his visions of the future, Edward is aware of the fate that awaits him and acknowledges his own story will be over soon, but encourages Noa to forge his own path. Later, he returns home to his family, where he discovers that Tessa gave birth to a boy after the night they spent in Singapore, and decides to name his newborn son Haytham.

=== Other appearances ===
Edward's first appearance in the franchise was in the 2012 novel Assassin's Creed: Forsaken by Oliver Bowden, which follows the perspective of his son, Haytham, and recounts the events leading up to Edward's eventual fate. The novel establishes that Edward kept a journal documenting his extensive research on the First Civilization, which was sought by Reginald Birch, his property manager and, secretly, the Grand Master of the British Templars. In 1735, Edward was killed by mercenaries sent by Birch to break into his mansion in Queen Anne's Square and steal his journal. This also allowed Birch to take Haytham under his wing and indoctrinate him into the Templar Order. Although Haytham eventually discovered the truth years later and avenged his father, he chose to stay a Templar.

Edward is also featured in Assassin's Creed: Black Flag, the novelization of the 2013 video game, and Assassin's Creed: Awakening, a non-canonical manga adaptation of the game, written by Takashi Yano and illustrated by Kenji Oiwa. In 2017, Edward appeared in the third issue of the Assassin's Creed: Reflections comic book miniseries, which recounts his encounter with infamous pirate Edward "Ned" Low. Edward's legacy and his mansion serve as a plot point in the 2015 game Assassin's Creed Syndicate, in which the protagonists search for a Shroud of Eden found by Edward during his travels. He is also featured in Dead Men's Gold, a story arc from the 2018 mobile spin-off game Assassin's Creed: Rebellion, which serves as a prequel to the introduction sequence of Black Flag. Like other series protagonists, Edward's outfit has been an unlockable cosmetic option in most subsequent releases, including the remastered version of Assassin's Creed III, released in 2019.

Outside the Assassin's Creed series, Edward has been referenced in the 2020 game Watch Dogs: Legion, where a statue of the character can be found in an underground Assassin Tomb in London, as part of a non-canonical crossover between the Assassin's Creed and Watch Dogs franchises.

== Promotion and merchandise ==
In conjunction with Ubisoft, Todd McFarlane and his McFarlane Toys Design Group designed a highly detailed, hand-painted, and cold-cast resin limited-edition statue of Edward Kenway. Only one thousand pieces were created and distributed worldwide, and each statue includes a Certificate of Authenticity hand-signed by McFarlane.

== Reception ==
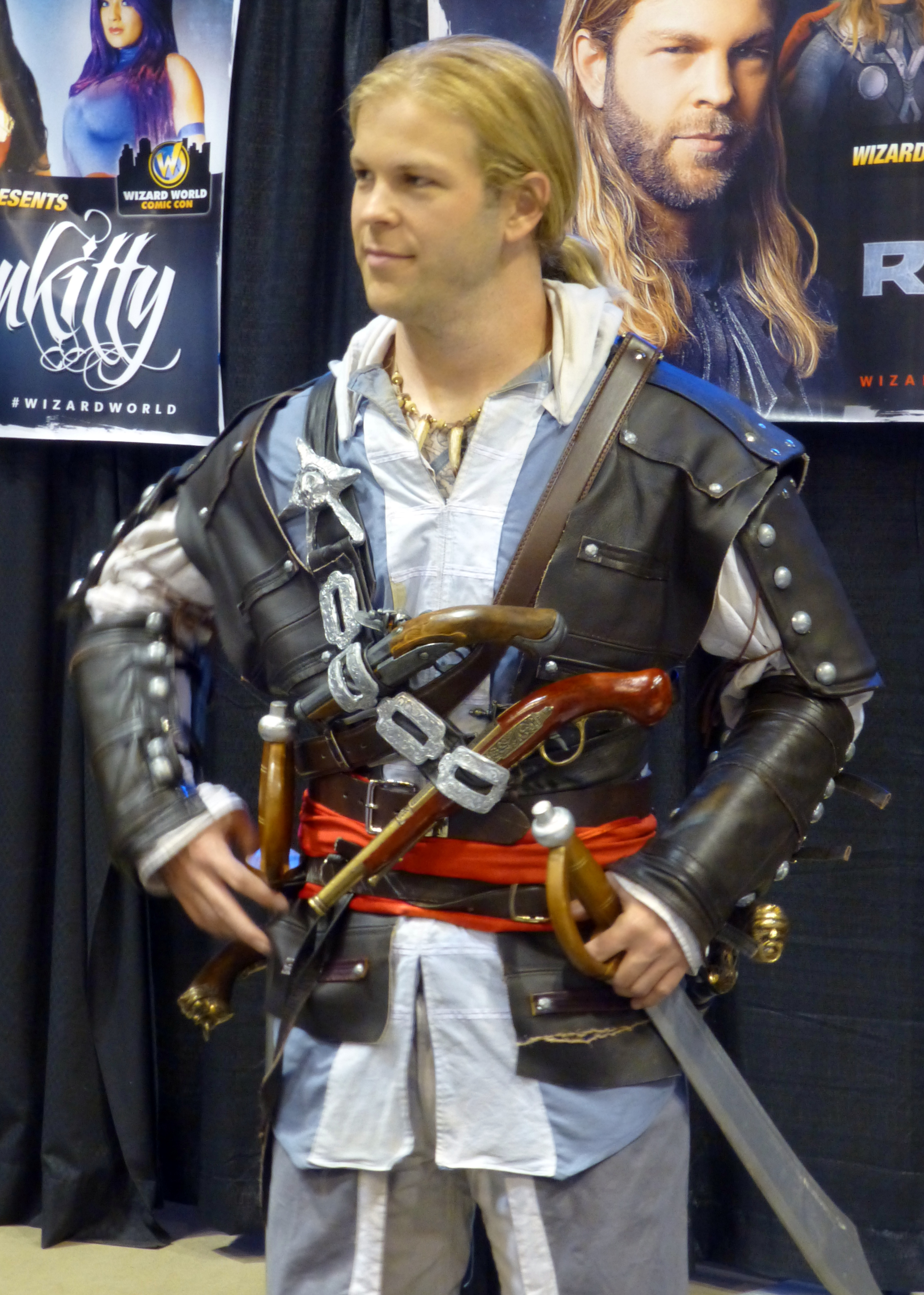
A cosplayer recreating Edward Kenway's unhooded appearance.

Edward Kenway has been well received by video game journalists, with high placements on several "top character" ranking lists of Assassin's Creed series protagonists. VideoGamer.com ranked him among the best pirates in video games.

Matt Purslow from IGN described Edward as the "true secret weapon" of Black Flag, the central element that binds the game's disparate elements and features together, and argued that it manages to avoid the pitfalls of over-reliance on MacGuffin plot devices like its predecessors due to the narrative focus on Edward's personal journey. He found the character's privateer-turned-pirate background, a chancer looking for profit whose decision to steal the robes of a member of the Assassins sparks his growth from rebel to honorable captain, to be a "fresh perspective to the overarching narrative of the series". Andrei Dobra from Softpedia interpreted McDevitt's statements about Edward in an interview with VG247 as indicative of a belief that the popularity of Black Flag is largely because the character is an unusual protagonist who trumps many established tropes concerning heroes in the franchise. In an article which offers an impression of Assassin's Creed: Valhalla Jordan Ramée from GameSpot reflected on his gameplay experience with Edward in Black Flag fondly, where combat sequences often involved head-on confrontation of foes and that Edward solves many of his problems as a pirate that's making the most of the tools of an Assassin. Evan Stallworth Carr from The Daily Californian found Edward Kenway to be "a deeply interesting character" who displays a "charismatic and outgoing personality" for his pirate persona. On the other hand, Carr opined that he does not fit well into the lore of the series, which in his view ultimately hurt the plot of Black Flag. Stephen Totilo was of the opinion that while the subplot involving the wife he left behind paid off beautifully at its conclusion, Edward is a "forgettable lead" and his character arc is "shallow".

The ending sequence of Black Flag has attracted praise for its depiction of Edward's character development. Tom Phillips from Eurogamer found it to be a "surprisingly mature conclusion for a series all about stabbing people in the neck", as Kenway finally gives up a life of piracy to settle down with his newly discovered daughter, and that it took the entirety of the narrative of Black Flag where his experiences of the deaths of all of his close friends and loved ones lead him to making a sensible decision about his life. Erik Kain from Forbes found the final moments of Black Flag to be "surprisingly beautiful", describing the finale as an "oddly sad and redemptive" contemplation of the character's loss which segues to his conversation with his daughter which is both playful and regretful in tone.

=== Analysis ===
Nick Dinicola from Pop Matters found the narrative approach by Black Flag to be interesting, as its lead character does not become an official member of the Brotherhood of Assassins by the ending of the game; instead, the story explores both sides of the long-running Assassin-Templar conflict from the perspective of an indifferent protagonist, and allows players a better sense of the Assassins' code of conduct as Edward gradually becomes sympathetic to their cause and acknowledges that their creed is “the beginning of wisdom.” In his paper which examines the representation of female characters in the Assassin’s Creed Series published by St. Mary's University of Minnesota, Stephen J. Fishburne described Edward Kenway as "capturing the ideal of masculinity and the self-made man to the greatest extent" amongst other male protagonists in the series, and noted that "the consequences of his irresponsibility are really only felt by those around him" because he is still considered the "hero of Black Flag". In a paper which analyzes the cultural depiction of piracy in video games, Eugen Pfister said the depiction of pirates as rebels but not revolutionaries in Black Flag is historically accurate. Pfister noted that while Edward mostly acts ethically and adheres to his own code of conduct as he tries to do the “right thing”, he becomes a “gentleman of fortune” of his own volition in the first place, and that even more importantly, he seeks no redemption for his violent actions when it comes to exploring and hunting for victims. This is reinforced by the game's mechanics, which encourages constant pillaging and raiding of merchant ships to improve the performance of Edward's flagship and offers the character "no incentive to ponder the possibility of becoming an honest man again".
