= Assassin's Creed (novel series) =

Book series

- Author: Oliver Bowden (Anton Gill: 2009 – 2011; Andrew Holmes: 2011 – 2017); Matthew J. Kirby (2016–2020); Christie Golden (2016); Gordon Doherty (2018); Yan Leisheng (2019 – present); Oliver Gay (2021); Mathieu Rivero (2021); Alain T. Puysségur (2021); Adrien Tomas (2022); Elsa Sjunneson (2022); James Hamer-Morton (2022); Kate Heartfield (2022–2023); Jaleigh Johnson (2023); Rick Barba (2023); Maria Lewis (2023)
- Country: United Kingdom, United States, France, China
- Language: English; Chinese (The Ming Storm series); French (Fragments series, The Silk Road)
- Genre: Fantasy, historical fiction
- Publisher: Main: Penguin Books (2009–2020); Aconyte Books (2020 – present); Other: Scholastic (2016–2017); Ubisoft Publishing (2016–2017); Obuolys (2016); Ace Books (2018); New Star Press (in China; 2019 – present); 404 Éditions (in France; 2021 – 2022); Hachette Heroes (in France; 2021); Welbeck Publishing Group (2022); Dark Horse Comics (2023); Titan Books (2023–2024)
- Published: November 20, 2009 – present
- Media type: Print (paperback), e-book, audiobook

The Assassin's Creed series is a collection of novels by various authors, set within the fictional universe of the Assassin's Creed video game franchise created by Ubisoft. The books are set across various time periods and, like the games, revolve around the secret war fought for centuries between the Assassin Brotherhood and the Templar Order. The series includes both direct novelizations of several Assassin's Creed games, and books that function as standalone narratives, although some of these tie-in with one or more of the games in the franchise. British publishing house Penguin Books was responsible for the publication of most of the novels in the series, as well as their respective audiobook versions, until 2020, when Aconyte Books took over as the main publisher of the series.

== Novelizations and tie-ins ==
=== Renaissance (2009) ===
The first official Assassin's Creed novel, Assassin's Creed: Renaissance, was written by Anton Gill (under the pen name Oliver Bowden) and is a novelization of Assassin's Creed II. It was published by Penguin Books on 20 November 2009 in the United Kingdom, and on 23 February 2010 in the United States. While the novel follows the game's events involving Ezio Auditore da Firenze (with the modern-day aspect entirely excluded), it changes much of the dialogue, the appearances of certain characters, and how some events occurred. It also omits certain events, while including others not featured in the game (some of these, such as Ezio's relationship with his first girlfriend, Cristina Vespucci, would later be adapted in Assassin's Creed: Brotherhood).

=== Brotherhood (2010) ===
Assassin's Creed: Brotherhood, the second novel in the series, was also written by Anton Gill and is based on the video game of the same name. It was published by Penguin Books on 25 November 2010 in the United Kingdom, and on 30 November in the United States. Like Assassin's Creed: Renaissance, the novel changes some elements from Brotherhood, including an entirely new sequence of events set during the time skip from 1503 to 1507 in the game, but is overall a much more faithful adaptation.

=== The Secret Crusade (2011) ===
Assassin's Creed: The Secret Crusade is the third novel in the series written by Andrew Holmes (using the same name pen name of Oliver Bowden), and depicts the story of Altaïr Ibn-LaʼAhad, as told by Niccolò Polo in his journal. While the book adapts the events of Assassin's Creed, Assassin's Creed: Bloodlines, and the Altaïr sequences from Assassin's Creed Revelations, it is primarily a standalone narrative that covers Altaïr's entire life, from his childhood to his death in 1257. It was published by Penguin Books on 23 June 2011 in the United Kingdom, and on 28 June in the United States.

=== Revelations (2011) ===
Assassin's Creed: Revelations is the final novel in the series written by Anton Gill and is an adaptation of the video game of the same name, focusing on Ezio Auditore's side of the story. The novel also describes the final years of Ezio's life, after the events of the game, and includes a novelization of the short film Assassin's Creed: Embers. It was published by Penguin Books on 24 November 2011 in the United Kingdom, and on 29 November 2011 in the United States.

=== Forsaken (2012) ===
Assassin's Creed: Forsaken, again written by Andrew Holmes, is based on Assassin's Creed III, but is not a direct adaptation. Instead, it tells the story of Haytham Kenway, the game's main antagonist, from his childhood to his death in 1781, showing a mirrored perspective to what the game portrays. Similarly to Assassin's Creed: The Secret Crusade, the novel is written in an in-universe style, being presented as Haytham's journal, which his son Connor (the game's main protagonist) recovers and reads through following his father's death. Forsaken was published by Penguin Books on 4 December 2012 in both the United Kingdom and the United States.

=== Black Flag (2013) ===
Assassin's Creed: Black Flag, again written by Andrew Holmes, is based on Assassin's Creed IV: Black Flag. It was published by Penguin Books on 7 November 2013 in the United Kingdom, and on 26 November in the United States. The novel, written in an in-universe style, is presented as the journal of protagonist Edward Kenway, and covers his entire life up until his return to England in 1723, after the events of the game.

=== Unity (2014) ===
Assassin's Creed: Unity, again written by Andrew Holmes, is based on the video game of the same name. It was published by Penguin Books on 20 November 2014 in the United Kingdom, and on 2 December in the United States. Similarly to Assassin's Creed: Forsaken, the novel presents the events of the game from the perspective of a different character (in this case, Élise de la Serre), as well as the experiences of protagonist Arno Dorian after the game, who recovers and reads through Élise's journal.

=== Underworld (2015) ===
Assassin's Creed: Underworld was again written by Andrew Holmes and is based on Assassin's Creed Syndicate. It was published by Penguin Books on 5 November 2015 in the United Kingdom, and on 1 December in the United States. The novel primarily focuses on the character of Jayadeep Mir, son of the Assassin Arbaaz Mir, before he adopted the identity of Henry Green and instead operated as "The Ghost" in London. The first two thirds of the book are mainly set in 1862, six years before the events of Syndicate, and alternate between the perspectives of Henry and several other characters, such as Detective Frederick Abberline and Henry's mentor Ethan Frye. The final third includes a novelization of Syndicate's storyline, from the perspectives of Henry and Evie Frye.

=== The Official Movie Novelization (2016) ===
Assassin's Creed: The Official Movie Novelization, written by Christie Golden, is a novelization of the live-action Assassin's Creed film. It was published in the United States by Ubisoft's in-house publishing company, Ubisoft Publishing, and in the United Kingdom by Penguin Books on 21 December 2016, the same day as the release of the film. In addition to retelling the film's events, the book also includes an anthology of short stories from Nathan, Emir, Moussa, Lin, and their respective ancestors, and an excerpt from Assassin's Creed: Heresy, also authored by Golden.

=== Origins – Desert Oath (2017) ===
Assassin's Creed Origins: Desert Oath is the final novel in the series written by Andrew Holmes, and is a prequel to Assassin's Creed Origins, telling the story of a young Bayek of Siwa and his father Sabu in Ptolemaic Egypt. It was published in the United States by Ubisoft Publishing and in the United Kingdom by Penguin Books on 10 October 2017.

=== Odyssey (2018) ===
Assassin's Creed Odyssey (The Official Novelization), written by Gordon Doherty, tells one of the possible story paths of Assassin's Creed Odyssey featuring Kassandra, one of the two protagonists of the game. It was published on 30 October 2018 by Ace Books.

=== Valhalla – Geirmund's Saga (2020) ===
Assassin's Creed: Valhalla – Geirmund's Saga, written by Matthew J. Kirby, is a tie-in novel to Assassin's Creed Valhalla. It was published by Penguin Books in the United Kingdom on 10 November 2020, and by Aconyte Books in the United States on 23 March 2021. The book does not follow the events of Valhalla, although they are occasionally referenced and several characters from the game make appearances in the novel. Instead, the plot centers on the Viking Geirmund Hel-hide as he tries to prove his worth to the Great Heathen Army during their invasion of the British Isles.

=== Valhalla – Sword of the White Horse (2022) ===
Assassin's Creed: Valhalla – Sword of the White Horse, written by Elsa Sjunneson, is a tie-in novel and sequel to Assassin's Creed Valhalla. It was published by Aconyte Books on 26 April 2022 in the United States, and on 7 July in the United Kingdom. The plot is set in 878 and follows the witch-warrior Niamh of Argyll, who infiltrates the Hidden Ones to learn about their intentions in England and recover the legendary sword Excalibur, which is sacred to her people, from the Raven Clan.

=== The Golden City (2023) ===
Assassin's Creed: The Golden City, written by Jaleigh Johnson, is a tie-in novel to Assassin's Creed Valhalla and Assassin's Creed Mirage, bridging the gap between the two games. It was published by Aconyte Books on 2 May 2023 in the United States, and on 22 June in the United Kingdom. The plot is set in 867 and follows the Hidden One Hytham, who joins his mentor Basim Ibn Ishaq in Constantinople to help him thwart a murderous scheme by the Order of the Ancients. Secretly, however, Hytham's mission has an ulterior objective: to test where his mentor's true loyalties lie.

=== The World of Assassin's Creed Valhalla (2023) ===
The World of Assassin's Creed Valhalla: Journey to the North – Logs and Files of a Hidden One is an illustrated hardcover book written by Rick Barba and published by Dark Horse Comics on 12 July 2023. The book is presented as an in-universe journal of the character Hytham from Assassin's Creed Valhalla and recounts most of the game's events.

=== Mirage – Daughter of No One (2023) ===
Assassin's Creed: Mirage – Daughter of No One, written by Maria Lewis, is a tie-in novel and prequel to Assassin's Creed Mirage. It was published by Aconyte Books on 21 November 2023 in the United States, and on 18 January 2024 in the United Kingdom. The plot is primarily set in 824 and follows Roshan during her early years before joining the Hidden Ones and becoming Basim Ibn Ishaq's mentor.

== Other ==
=== Last Descendants series (2016–2017) ===
Assassin's Creed: Last Descendants is a trilogy of young adult novels written by Matthew J. Kirby and published by Scholastic, set in the Assassin's Creed universe. They are the first novels in the series to tell a completely original narrative, unrelated to any of the Assassin's Creed games.

==== Last Descendants (2016) ====
The first installment in the trilogy, Assassin's Creed: Last Descendants, was released on 30 August 2016. Set in 2016, the plot follows a teenager named Owen Meyers who attempts to prove his late father's innocence of a crime he did not commit. Using an Animus device, Owen relives the memories of his ancestors and discovers the existence of an artifact called the Trident of Eden, catching the attention of both the Assassins and Templars. Hoping to find the artifact before they do, Owen teams up with other teenagers to dive into a simulation of memories they all share in their DNA, set during the 1863 New York City draft riots, with their experiences in the past having consequences on the present.

==== Tomb of the Khan (2016) ====
The second installment, Assassin's Creed: Last Descendants – Tomb of the Khan, was released on 27 December 2016. The plot follows the same teenage protagonists from the first novel, who have sided with either the Assassins or the Templars and are searching for the second fragment of the Trident of Eden, believed to have been buried with Möngke Khan. To this end, they use the Animus to relive the memories of their ancestors during the Mongol conquest of China in 1259.

==== Fate of the Gods (2017) ====
The final installment, Assassin's Creed: Last Descendants – Fate of the Gods, was released on 26 December 2017. The plot follows the teenage protagonists on both sides of the Assassin-Templar war, now working together to find the final fragment of the Trident of Eden, last seen in 10th-century Scandinavia during the Viking Age. They must accomplish their mission before the Trident is assembled by Isaiah, a rogue Templar seeking to use the artifact to bring about the end of the world.

=== Heresy (2016) ===
Assassin's Creed: Heresy, written by Christie Golden, was published on 15 November 2016 in the United States by Ubisoft's in-house publishing studio, Ubisoft Publishing, and on 4 May 2017 in the United Kingdom by Penguin Books. The story follows the Templar Simon Hathaway as he relives the memories of his ancestor Gabriel Laxart, who fought by Joan of Arc's side during the Hundred Years' War. The events of the novel take place concurrently with those of the Last Descendants trilogy.

=== The Ming Storm series (2019–present) ===
Assassin's Creed: The Ming Storm is a planned trilogy of non-canon novels written by Yan Leisheng that focus on the Chinese Assassin Shao Jun. Thus far, only the first two books in the series have been released.

==== The Ming Storm (2019) ====
The first installment of the trilogy, Assassin's Creed: The Ming Storm, was published by New Star Press in China on 31 March 2019, by Mana Books in France on 1 October 2020, and by Aconyte Books in the United States on 1 June 2021, and in the United Kingdom on 2 September 2021. The book is primarily an alternate retelling of Assassin's Creed Chronicles: China, following Shao Jun as she returns to China to rebuild the Assassin Brotherhood and exact revenge on the Templar group, the Eight Tigers.

==== The Desert Threat (2021) ====
The second installment, Assassin's Creed: The Desert Threat (known in China as Storm in the Desert) was published by New Star Press in China on 4 October 2021, and by Aconyte Books in the United States on 18 October 2022. The plot follows Shao Jun as she travels to Mongolia to recover the Precursor box, taken by the Templars, and becomes entangled in a web of political intrigues and shadowy conspiracies.

=== Fragments series (2021–2022) ===
Assassin's Creed: Fragments is a collection of three young adult novels written by different French authors and published by 404 Éditions. Each novel revolves around a pair of siblings and Assassins in the making, at various points in history.

==== The Blade of Aizu (2021) ====
The first novel, Assassin's Creed: Fragments – The Blade of Aizu, was written by Olivier Gay and released in France on 4 March 2021. An English-language version was released on 14 March 2023 by Titan Books. The plot takes place in 19th-century Japan, during the Boshin civil war of 1868–1869, and focuses on siblings Ibuka and Atsuko Shiba.

==== The Highlands Children (2021) ====
The second novel, Assassin's Creed: Fragments – The Highlands Children, was written by Alain T. Puysségur and released in France on 16 September 2021. An English-language version was released on 14 November 2023 by Titan Books. The plot is set in 13th-century Scotland, during its invasion by King Edward I of England in 1296, and focuses on twins Fillan and Ailéas.

==== The Witches of the Moors (2022) ====
The final novel, Assassin's Creed: Fragments – The Witches of the Moors, was written by Adrien Tomas and released in France on 20 January 2022. An English-language version was set to be released by Titan Books but was cancelled for unknown reasons. The plot is set in 17th-century France, during the Labourd witch-hunt of 1609, and focuses on sisters Margaux and Ermeline.

=== The Silk Road (2021) ===
Assassin's Creed: The Silk Road, written by Mathieu Rivero, is a choose your own adventure book that follows Oisel, a Frankish Hidden One who travels to the Levant upon receiving a mysterious letter from Basim Ibn Ishaq, the leader of the Brotherhood in Constantinople. It was published in France on 8 September 2021 by Hachette Heroes.

=== The Engine of History series (2022–2023) ===
Assassin's Creed: The Engine of History is a two-part novel series written by Kate Heartfield that revolves around the titular device, which both the Assassins and Templars hope to use to influence the course of human history. Although originally announced as a trilogy, in August 2024, Heartfield revealed on Twitter that the publisher had no current plans for a third book in the series.

==== The Magus Conspiracy (2022) ====
The first installment in the trilogy, Assassin's Creed: The Engine of History – The Magus Conspiracy, was published by Aconyte Books on 2 August 2022 in the United States, and on 27 October in the United Kingdom. The plot is set in London from 1851 to 1862 and follows Pierrette Arnaud, a French acrobat who becomes caught in the Assassin-Templar war after saving the life of mathematician Ada Lovelace. Together with Lovelace's childhood friend, the Assassin Simeon Price, Pierrette attempts to find the Engine of History before the Templars can, and in the process the pair uncover a web of political assassinations destabilizing Europe.

==== The Resurrection Plot (2023) ====
The second installment, Assassin's Creed: The Engine of History – The Resurrection Plot, was published by Aconyte Books on 4 July 2023. The plot is set from 1869 to 1889 and follows Pierrette Arnaud and Simeon Price as they join forces once again to thwart a series of Templar terrorist attacks across Europe and Africa and recover the Engine of History.

=== Escape Room Puzzle Book (2022) ===
Assassin's Creed: Escape Room Puzzle Book is a puzzle book written by James Hamer-Morton and published by Welbeck Publishing Group on 29 November 2022. Featuring characters and locations from multiple Assassin's Creed games, the book follows museum employee Joey, who becomes involved with the Assassins and must help them thwart the schemes of the malevolent Isu Vejovis.

== See also ==
- List of novels based on video games
