= Assassin's Creed: Embers =

- Film poster
- Directed by: Laurent Bernier; Ghislain Ouellet
- Written by: Darby McDevitt
- Story by: Alexandre Amancio; Jean Guesdon; Corey May; Louis-Pierre Pharand
- Produced by: Louis-Pierre Pharand; Jean-Jacques Tremblay; Yves Guillemot; Serge Hascoët; Yannis Mallat; Sébastien Puel
- Starring: Roger Craig Smith
- Music by: Jesper Kyd
- Production company: UbiWorkshop
- Distributed by: Ubisoft
- Release date: 15 November 2011 (Canada)
- Running time: 21 minutes
- Country: Canada

Assassin's Creed: Embers is a 2011 Canadian animated short film created by UbiWorkshop, based on the Assassin's Creed video game franchise. It serves as a conclusion to the story of Ezio Auditore da Firenze, the protagonist of Assassin's Creed II, Brotherhood, and Revelations, who has also featured in several other works. Taking place in 1524, twelve years after the events of Revelations, the film depicts an elderly Ezio living a peaceful life with his family in rural Tuscany after retiring from the Assassin Order, until the appearance of a mysterious Assassin threatens to put his family in danger.

The film is included as a bonus in the Signature and Collector's Editions of Assassin's Creed: Revelations. It was later re-released on the PlayStation Store on 23 April 2015. The film was first revealed on July 21, 2011, when UbiWorkshop showed a teaser trailer at Comic-Con 2011. According to the developers, Embers is the final chapter of Ezio's story, and although it can be watched at anytime, it is best to experience it after completing Revelations, in order to fully understand the complete tale of Ezio.

== Plot ==
In 1524, twelve years after finding Altaïr's secret library, Ezio Auditore da Firenze has retired from the Assassin Order and is living a peaceful life in the Tuscan countryside with his wife Sofia and his children Flavia and Marcello while writing his memoirs. One day, a stranger appears, a Chinese Assassin named Shao Jun, who came to Ezio to seek knowledge of his life as an Assassin. Although Ezio prefers that Shao Jun not stay, due to his desire to leave his days as an Assassin behind, Sofia allows her to stay for the night. The next day, Ezio catches Shao Jun reading his memoirs and bids her to leave, but relents after she asks him about what it means to be an Assassin.

While on a trip to his birthplace of Florence, Ezio tells Shao Jun his story of how his father and brothers were executed in the town square, forcing him to become an Assassin, and how such a life only brings suffering. As they leave, they are attacked by a stranger, who appears to be of Asian origin as well. After killing him, Shao Jun reveals that she is a former concubine, now on the run from servants of the Chinese Jiajing Emperor, and explains how her former master rescued her from his influence. Returning home, Ezio tells Sofia and his children to leave, knowing that others will come. He then teaches Shao Jun the key to liberating her people from the Emperor's influence. Later that night, Ezio's villa is attacked by more of Shao Jun's enemies. The two Assassins manage to kill them all, although the fight exhausts Ezio. The next morning, Ezio hands Shao Jun a small box and tells her it may come to use one day, but only if "you lose your way". He then sends her away as two riders arrive at the villa.

Some time after, Ezio journeys to Florence with Sofia and Flavia, despite suffering from heart problems. While resting on a bench, a young man with a scar on his face approaches Ezio and berates the women of Florence, reminding Ezio of his younger self. After telling Ezio to get some rest, the man leaves, just as Ezio suffers a fatal heart attack and dies in view of his family. The film ends as a final letter from Ezio to Sofia is read, saying that of all the things that kept him going throughout life, love for the world and people around him was the strongest of them all.

== Voice cast ==
- Roger Craig Smith as Ezio Auditore da Firenze
- Angela Galuppo as Shao Jun and Flavia Auditore
- Anna Tuveri as Sofia Sartor
- Peter Arpesella as young Italian man
