= Anton Gill =

English author

- Born: 1948 (age 77–78); Ilford, Essex, United Kingdom
- Occupation: Writer
- Writing career
- Pen name: Oliver Bowden; Antony Cutler; Ray Evans
- Genres: Contemporary history, fiction
- Website: antongill.com

Anton Gill (born in 1948) is a British writer of historical fiction and nonfiction. He won the H. H. Wingate Award for non-fiction for The Journey Back From Hell, an account of the lives of survivors after their liberation from Nazi concentration camps.

== Personal life ==
Gill was born in Ilford, Essex, and educated at Chigwell School and Clare College, Cambridge. He started writing professionally in 1984 after fifteen years in the theatre. He lives in London with his wife, the actress Marji Campi. Other than writing, his chief interests are travel and art.

== Career ==
Gill worked as an actor and director in the theatre (especially at the Royal Court Theatre in London), for the Arts Council, and for the BBC and TV-am (as writer and producer) before turning to full-time writing.

He has been a full-time professional writer since 1984. He has published over 40 books on a variety of ancient and contemporary historical subjects, including three biographies. His work includes both fiction and non-fiction, where his special field is contemporary European history. In fiction, he has written a series of historical mysteries set in Ancient Egypt, during the Amarna Period. These stories feature "the world's first private eye", the scribe, Huy, and have been published worldwide. Titles in the Huy series are City of the Horizon (1991), City of Dreams (1993), and City of the Dead (1994). More recently, he published The Sacred Scroll, a history-mystery, with Penguin. He is also the author of two major biographies, on William Dampier and Peggy Guggenheim, and a study of Michelangelo, Il Gigante. His most recent titles are the novels City of Gold (Penguin), The Accursed (Piatkus), and Into Darkness (Endeavour; Sharpe), Lost and Found - trilogy (Sharpe), The Darkest Trap.

== Bibliography ==
Non-fiction

- The Journey Back from Hell (1988); eBook reissue (2015)
- A Dance between Flames
- An Honourable Defeat
- Berlin to Bucharest
- The Devil's Mariner
- Art Addict

Fiction:

- The Egyptian Mysteries
- The Sacred Scroll
- City of Gold
- The Accursed
- Into Darkness
- Assassin's Creed: Renaissance (2009, as Oliver Bowden)
- Assassin's Creed: Brotherhood (2010, as Oliver Bowden)
- Assassin's Creed: Revelations (2011, as Oliver Bowden)
