= List of comics based on films =

This is a list of comics based on films. Often a film becomes successful, popular or attains cult status and the franchise produces spin-offs that may include comics. The comics can be direct adaptations of the film, a continuation of the story using the characters, or both.

Comics allow a degree of flexibility which can result in crossovers with other film characters as well as those from comics. In particular, the Aliens and Predator comics have crossed over with The Terminator, Superman, Batman, Judge Dredd and Green Lantern.

There are a number of companies that specialise in licensed properties, including Dark Horse, Titan, Avatar and Dynamite Entertainment. With the bigger series the license can often pass between a number of companies over the history of the title.

For comics adapted from unmade films, see List of comics based on unproduced film projects.

== 0–9 ==
Based on	Title	Length	Format	Publication date	Authors	Publisher	Notes	Collected editions
101 Dalmatians	Walt Disney's Treasury of Classic Tales: 101 Dalmatians	13 installments	Newspaper strip	January 1 – March 26, 1961	Frank Reilly	King Features Syndicate	Adaptations of the 1961 animated film; the book version (32 pages total) was accompanied by two supplementary one-page stories "Dalmatian Animation" and "Dalmatian Diary by Pongo". The artwork for the strip version done by Bill Wright, Chuck Fuson, Manuel Gonzales and Floyd Gottfredson, while the artwork for the book version was done by Al Hubbard.	
101 Dalmatians	Four Color (series 2) #1183	1 issue	One-shot	May–July 1961	Carl Fallberg	Dell Comics	Adaptations of the 1961 animated film; the book version (32 pages total) was accompanied by two supplementary one-page stories "Dalmatian Animation" and "Dalmatian Diary by Pongo". The artwork for the strip version done by Bill Wright, Chuck Fuson, Manuel Gonzales and Floyd Gottfredson, while the artwork for the book version was done by Al Hubbard.	
101 Dalmatians	Disney Comic Hits #16	1 issue	One-shot	January 1997	Sheryl Scarborough, Kayte Kuch	Marvel Comics	Adaptation of the 1996 live action film.	
101 Dalmatians	Disney Villains: Cruella De Vil	5 issues	Limited series	January – September 2024	Sweeney Boo	Dynamite Entertainment	Fourth installment in Dynamite's Disney Villains comic line.	
1941	1941: The Illustrated Story	1 issue	Magazine	December 1979	Allan Asherman	HM Communications, Inc., Pocket Books		No
20 Million Miles to Earth	20 Million Miles More	4 issues	Limited series	June – August 2007	Scott Davis	TidalWave Productions		Paperback: 0-9792751-8-0/978-0-9792751-8-0
20,000 Leagues Under the Sea (1954)	Walt Disney's Treasury of Classic Tales: 20,000 Leagues Under the Sea	22 installments	Newspaper strip	August 1 – December 26, 1954	Frank Reilly	King Features Syndicate	Adaptations of the 1954 film version based on the eponymous 1870 novel by Jules Verne; the artwork for the strip version was done by Jesse Marsh, while the artwork for the book version (34 pages total) was done by Frank Thorne.	
20,000 Leagues Under the Sea (1954)	Four Color (series 2) #614	1 issue	One-shot	February 1955	Paul S. Newman	Dell Comics	Adaptations of the 1954 film version based on the eponymous 1870 novel by Jules Verne; the artwork for the strip version was done by Jesse Marsh, while the artwork for the book version (34 pages total) was done by Frank Thorne.	No
28 Days Later	28 Days Later: The Aftermath	1 volume	Graphic novel	April 2007	Steve Niles	Fox Atomic Comics	Set between the first film and sequel 28 Weeks Later (2007).	
28 Days Later	28 Days Later	24 issues	Ongoing series	July 2009 – June 2011	Michael Alan Nelson	Boom! Studios	Another story set between the first and second films.	
3 Ninjas	3 Ninjas Kick Back	3 issues	Limited series	June – August 1994	Clint McElroy	NOW Comics	Adaptation of the second film.	No
The 3 Worlds of Gulliver	Four Color (series 2) #1158	1 issue	One-shot	February–April 1961	Paul S. Newman	Dell Comics	Adaptation of the eponymous film, plus two supplementary one-page fillers "Strange People--Fabled Lands" and "Man, Mountain and Toy"; 32 pages total, art by Mike Sekowsky and Mike Peppe.	No
The 300 Spartans	Dell Movie Classics #439: "Lion of Sparta"	1 issue	One-shot	January 1963	Paul S. Newman	Dell Comics	Adaptation of the eponymous 1962 film, published under the film's original working title; 32 pages total, art by Gerald McCann.	No
55 Days at Peking	55 Days at Peking	1 issue	One-shot	September 1963	Paul S. Newman	Gold Key Comics	Adaptation of the eponymous film, plus a "Keys of Knowledge" one-page filler "The Boxer Rebellion" and a pin-up of the film overall; 32 pages total, art by Mike Sekowsky and Mike Peppe.	No
The 7th Voyage of Sinbad	Four Color (series 2) #944	1 issue	One-shot	September 1958	Gaylord DuBois	Dell Comics	Adaptations of the eponymous film; the earlier Dell publication was supplemented with two one-page fillers, "Monsters Encountered by Sinbad" and "Map of Island of Colossa", both written by the book's author Gaylord DuBois. The artwork for the Dell version (32 pages total) was done by John Buscemi, while the artwork for the Marvel version (18 pages total) was done by Sonny Trinidad with colors by Petra Goldberg.	No
The 7th Voyage of Sinbad	Marvel Spotlight #25: "The Seventh Voyage of Sinbad"	1 issue	One-shot	John Warner	December 1975	Marvel Comics	Adaptations of the eponymous film; the earlier Dell publication was supplemented with two one-page fillers, "Monsters Encountered by Sinbad" and "Map of Island of Colossa", both written by the book's author Gaylord DuBois. The artwork for the Dell version (32 pages total) was done by John Buscemi, while the artwork for the Marvel version (18 pages total) was done by Sonny Trinidad with colors by Petra Goldberg.	No

== A ==
Based on	Title	Length	Format	Publication date	Authors	Publisher	Notes	Collected editions
The Abominable Dr. Phibes	Vincent Price Presents #13, 14, 28	3 issues	Main feature	November 2009, December 2009, March 2011	Adriano (#13), Mel Smith (#14, 28), Clark Castillo (#14), Paul Birch (#28)	TidalWave Productions	Dr. Phibes was featured in three self-contained stories spanning three selected issues apart in this series.	
The Absent-Minded Professor	Four Color (series 2) #1199: "The Absent-Minded Professor"	1 issue	One-shot	May–July 1961	Eric Freiwald, Robert Schaefer	Dell Comics	Adaptation of the original film; 32 pages total, art by John Ushler.	No
The Absent-Minded Professor	Walt Disney's Treasury of Classic Tales: Son of Flubber	13 installments	Newspaper strip	January 6 – March 31, 1963	Frank Reilly	King Features Syndicate	Adaptations of the eponymous sequel film; the art for the strip version was done by John Ushler, while the art for the book version (32 pages total) was done by Dan Spiegle.	No
The Absent-Minded Professor	Walt Disney's Son of Flubber	1 issue	One-shot	April 1963	?	Gold Key Comics	Adaptations of the eponymous sequel film; the art for the strip version was done by John Ushler, while the art for the book version (32 pages total) was done by Dan Spiegle.	No
The Abyss	The Abyss	2 issues	Limited series	June – July 1989	Randy Stradley	Dark Horse Comics	Adaptation of the eponymous film.	No
The Adventures of Baron Munchausen	The Adventures of Baron Munchausen	4 issues	Limited series	July – October 1989	Matthew Costello, Mark Wheatley	NOW Comics	Adaptation of the eponymous film.	No
The Adventures of Buckaroo Banzai Across the 8th Dimension	Buckaroo Banzai	2 issues	Limited series	November – December 1984	Bill Mantlo	Marvel Comics	Adaptation of the original film; first published in its complete form as Marvel Comics Super Special #33 earlier in November 1984.	No
The Adventures of Buckaroo Banzai Across the 8th Dimension	Buckaroo Banzai: Return of the Screw	3 issues	Limited series	May – November 2006	Earl Mac Rauch	Moonstone Books		
The Adventures of Buckaroo Banzai Across the 8th Dimension	Moonstone Holiday Super Spectacular #1: "A Christmas Corrall"	1 issue	One-shot	December 2007	Mac Rauch, Ken Wolak	Moonstone Books		
The Adventures of Buckaroo Banzai Across the 8th Dimension	Buckaroo Banzai: The Prequel	2 issues	Limited series	August – December 2008	Earl Mac Rauch, Chewie	Moonstone Books		
The Adventures of Buckaroo Banzai Across the 8th Dimension	Buckaroo Banzai: Big Size	1 issue	One-shot	January 2009	Earl Mac Rauch, Paul Hanley	Moonstone Books		
The Adventures of Buckaroo Banzai Across the 8th Dimension	Buckaroo Banzai: Origins	1 issue	One-shot	April 2009	Earl Mac Rauch, Amin Amat	Moonstone Books		
The Adventures of Buckaroo Banzai Across the 8th Dimension	Buckaroo Banzai: Hardest of the Hard	2 issues	Limited series	October 2009 – February 2010	Earl Mac Rauch	Moonstone Books		
The Adventures of Buckaroo Banzai Across the 8th Dimension	Buckaroo Banzai: Tears of a Clone	2 issues	Limited series	October 2012	Earl Mac Rauch, Paul D. Storrie	Moonstone Books		
The Adventures of Bullwhip Griffin	Walt Disney's Treasury of Classic Tales: The Adventures of Bullwhip Griffin	13 installments	Newspaper strip	February 5 – April 30, 1967	King Features Syndicate	King Features Syndicate	Adaptations of the eponymous film; the art for the strip version was done by John Ushler, while the art for the book version (32 pages total) was done by Dan Spiegle.	No
The Adventures of Bullwhip Griffin	Walt Disney Presents – Bullwhip Griffin	1 issue	One-shot	?	Gold Key Comics	June 1967	Adaptations of the eponymous film; the art for the strip version was done by John Ushler, while the art for the book version (32 pages total) was done by Dan Spiegle.	No
The Adventures of Ford Fairlane	The Adventures of Ford Fairlane	4 issues	Limited series	May – August 1990	Gerard Jones	DC Comics	Prequel to the eponymous film.	No
The Adventures of Huckleberry Finn	Four Color (series 2) #1114	1 issue	One-shot	July–September 1960	?	Dell Comics	Adaptation of the 1960 film based on the eponymous 1885 novel by Mark Twain.	No
The Adventures of Ichabod and Mr. Toad	Walt Disney's Disneyland Birthday Party: "The Adventures of Mr. Toad"	1 issue	Back-up feature	October 1958	Carl Fallberg	Dell Comics	Adaptation of the "Mr. Toad" segment of the eponymous film; 17 pages total, art by Pete Alvarado.	No
The Adventures of Ichabod and Mr. Toad	Walt Disney's Treasury of Classic Tales: The Adventures of Mr. Toad	13 installments	Newspaper strip	July 3 – September 25, 1983	Tom Yakutis	King Features Syndicate	Adaptation of the film in newspaper strip format; the art for this version was done by Richard Moore.	No
The Adventures of Quentin Durward	Four Color (series 2) #672: "Quentin Durward"	1 issue	One-shot	January 1956	Gaylord Du Bois	Dell Comics	Adaptation of the eponymous film.	No
The Adventures of Sharkboy and Lavagirl in 3-D	Disney Adventures: "Dream Team!"	1 issue	One-shot	May 2005		Disney Publishing Worldwide		No
After Earth	After Earth: Innocence	1 issue	One-shot	October 2012	Michael Jan Friedman, Robert Greenberger	Dynamite Entertainment	Prequel to the film.	No
Aladdin	Disney's Aladdin: The Official Movie Adaptation	1 issue	One-shot	1992	Bobbi J.G. Weiss	Disney Comics	Adaptation of the original film.	
Aladdin	The Return of Aladdin	2 issue	Limited series	May – June 1993	John Blair Moore, Carl Gafford	Disney Comics	Main feature storyline titled "More Arabian Nights".	No
Aladdin	Disney's Aladdin	11 issues	Ongoing series	August 1994 – June 1995	Lee Nordling, Dan Slott, Jack Enyart, Martin Powell, Oprah Casseys, Buzz Dixon	Marvel Comics		No
Aladdin	Disney Comic Hits #13: "Aladdin and the King of Thieves"	1 issue	One-shot	October 1996	Jack Enyart	Marvel Comics	Adaptation of the third film.	No
Alexander the Great	Four Color (series 2) #688	1 issue	One-shot	May 1956	Paul S. Newman	Dell Comics	Adaptation of the eponymous film.	No
Alice in Wonderland (1951)	Walt Disney's Alice in Wonderland	16 installments	Newspaper strip	September 2 – December 16, 1951	Frank Reilly	King Features Syndicate	First adaptation of the film in newspaper strip format; the art for this version was drawn by Manuel Gonzales and Dick Moores.	No
Alice in Wonderland (1951)	Four Color (series 2) #331	1 issue	One-shot	May 1951	Del Connell	Dell Comics	Adaptation of the eponymous film; 48 pages total, art by Riley Thompson and Bob Grant.	No
Alice in Wonderland (1951)	Four Color (series 2) #341: "Unbirthday Party with Alice in Wonderland"	1 issue	One-shot	July 1951	Don R. Christensen	Dell Comics	Original story based on the film; 33 pages total, art by Al Hubbard.	No
Alice in Wonderland (1951)	Walt Disney's Treasury of Classic Tales: Alice in Wonderland	12 installments	Newspaper strip	February 3 – April 28, 1974	Frank Reilly	King Features Syndicate	Second adaptation of the film in newspaper strip format; the art for this version was drawn by Mike Arens.	No
Alice in Wonderland (1951)	Wonderland	6 issues	Limited series	Tommy Kovac, Sonny Liew	Slave Labor Graphics	May 2006 – April 2008	Continuation based on the 1951 film.	
Alice in Wonderland (1951)	Alice in Wonderland: The Story of the Movie in Comics	1 volume	Graphic novel	Francois Corteggiani	Dark Horse Comics	March 2020	Adaptation of the 1951 film.	Hardcover: 1-5067-1735-7/978-1-5067-1735-7
Alice in Wonderland (2010)	Alice in Wonderland	1 volume	Graphic novel	July 2010	Alessandro Ferrari	Boom! Studios	Adaptation of the eponymous film.	Hardcover: 1-60886-537-1/978-1-60886-537-6
Alien (list)	Alien: The Illustrated Story	1 volume	Graphic novel	1979	Archie Goodwin	HM Communications, Inc.	Adaptation of the first film.	
Alien (list)	Filmsikerek képregény változata: A bolygó neve: Halál ("The Planet's Name: Death")	1 issue	One-shot	1987	Budapesti Film Forgalmazó és Moziüzemi Vállalat		Unlicensed Hungarian adaptation of Aliens (1986); part of a flip book issue with The Terminator (1984) ("A halálosztó") on the other side of the book cover. 32 pages total, art by Attila Fazekas.	
Alien (list)	Aliens (1988)	6 issues	Limited series	May 1988 – July 1989	Mark Verheiden	Dark Horse Comics		
Alien (list)	Aliens (1989)	4 issues	Limited series	August 1989 – May 1990	Mark Verheiden	Dark Horse Comics		
Alien (list)	Aliens: Earth War	4 issues	Limited series	June – October 1990	Mark Verheiden	Dark Horse Comics		
Alien (list)	Aliens: Genocide	4 issues	Limited series	November 1991 – February 1992	John Arcudi and Mike Richardson	Dark Horse Comics		
Alien (list)	Aliens: Hive	4 issues	Limited series	February – May 1992	Jerry Prosser	Dark Horse Comics		
Alien (list)	Alien³	3 issues	Limited series	June – July 1992	Steven Grant (adaptation)	Dark Horse Comics	Adaptation of the third film.	
Alien (list)	Aliens: Newt's Tale	2 issues	Limited series	July – August 1992	Mike Richardson	Dark Horse Comics	Alternate telling adaptation of the second film.	
Alien (list)	Aliens: Colonial Marines	10 issues	Limited series	January 1993 – October 1994	Chris Warner (#1–3), Kelley Puckett (#4–6, 8), Paul Guinan (#7), Dan Jolley (#9–10)	Dark Horse Comics		
Alien (list)	Aliens: Countdown	1 issue	One-shot	March 1993	Mike Richardson, Denis Beauvais	Dark Horse Comics	Originally published as a 14-part serial feature in Dark Horse Insider #14–27 (September 1990 – October 1991).	
Alien (list)	Aliens: Sacrifice	1 issue	One-shot	May 1993	Peter Milligan	Dark Horse Comics		
Alien (list)	Aliens: Labyrinth	4 issues	Limited series	September – December 1993	Jim Woodring	Dark Horse Comics		
Alien (list)	Aliens: Salvation	1 issue	One-shot	November 1993	Dave Gibbons	Dark Horse Comics		
Alien (list)	Aliens: Music of the Spheres	4 issues	Limited series	January – April 1994	Chet Williamson	Dark Horse Comics		
Alien (list)	Aliens: Stronghold	4 issues	Limited series	May – September 1994	John Arcudi	Dark Horse Comics		
Alien (list)	Aliens: Earth Angel	1 issue	One-shot	August 1994	John Byrne	Dark Horse Comics		
Alien (list)	Aliens: Berserker	4 issues	Limited series	January – April 1995	John Wagner	Dark Horse Comics		
Alien (list)	Aliens: Mondo Pest	1 issue	One-shot	April 1995	Henry Gilroy	Dark Horse Comics		
Alien (list)	Superman/Aliens	2 issues	Limited series	July – September 1995	Dan Jurgens	DC Comics, Dark Horse Comics	Crossover with DC's Superman.	
Alien (list)	Aliens: Mondo Heat	1 issue	One-shot	February 1996	Henry Gilroy	Dark Horse Comics		
Alien (list)	Aliens: Lovesick	1 issue	One-shot	December 1996	Thierry Gagnon, Richard Forgues, Randy Stradley	Dark Horse Comics		
Alien (list)	Batman/Aliens	2 issues	Limited series	Ron Marz	March – April 1997	DC Comics, Dark Horse Comics	Crossover with DC's Batman.	
Alien (list)	Aliens: Pig	1 issue	One-shot	March 1997	Chuck Dixon	Dark Horse Comics		
Alien (list)	Aliens: Havoc	2 issues	Limited series	June – July 1997	Mark Schultz	Dark Horse Comics		
Alien (list)	Aliens: Special	1 issue	One-shot	June 1997	Darko Macan ("45 Seconds"), Nancy A. Collins ("Elder Gods")	Dark Horse Comics	Anthology of two self-contained stories: "45 Seconds" and "Elder Gods".	
Alien (list)	Aliens: Purge	1 issue	One-shot	August 1997	Ian Edginton	Dark Horse Comics		
Alien (list)	Alien Resurrection	2 issues	Limited series	October – November 1997	Jim Vance	Dark Horse Comics	Adaptation of the fourth film.	
Alien (list)	Aliens: Alchemy	3 issues	Limited series	October – November 1997	John Arcudi	Dark Horse Comics		
Alien (list)	Aliens: Kidnapped	3 issues	Limited series	December 1997 – February 1998	Jim Woodring, Justin Green	Dark Horse Comics		
Alien (list)	Aliens: Survival	3 issues	Limited series	February – April 1998	James Vance	Dark Horse Comics		
Alien (list)	Aliens: Rogue	4 issues	Limited series	April – July 1998	Ian Edginton	Dark Horse Comics		
Alien (list)	Aliens: Glass Corridor	1 issue	One-shot	June 1998	David Lloyd	Dark Horse Comics		
Alien (list)	Aliens: Stalker	1 issue	One-shot	June 1998	David Wenzel	Dark Horse Comics		
Alien (list)	Aliens: Wraith	1 issue	One-shot	July 1998	Jay Stephens	Dark Horse Comics		
Alien (list)	WildC.A.T.s/Aliens	1 issues	One-shot	August 1998	Warren Ellis	Image Comics, Dark Horse Comics	Crossover with WildC.A.T.s.	
Alien (list)	Aliens: Apocalypse – The Destroying Angels	4 issues	Limited series	January – April 1999	Mark Schultz	Dark Horse Comics		
Alien (list)	Aliens: Xenogenesis	4 issues	Limited series	August – November 1999	Tom Bierbaum, Mary Bierbaum, Dave Ross, Andrew Pepoy	Dark Horse Comics	Part of the Xenogenesis crossover storyline with Predator and Aliens vs. Predator.	
Alien (list)	Green Lantern Versus Aliens	4 issues	Limited series	Ron Marz	September – December 2000	DC Comics, Dark Horse Comics	Crossover with DC's Green Lantern.	
Alien (list)	Superman/Aliens II: God War	4 issues	Limited series	May – November 2002	Chuck Dixon	DC Comics, Dark Horse Comics	Second crossover with Superman and sequel to the first comic.	
Alien (list)	Batman/Aliens II	3 issues	Limited series	January – March 2003	Ian Edginton	DC Comics, Dark Horse Comics	Second crossover with Batman and sequel to the first comic.	
Alien (list)	Judge Dredd versus Aliens: Incubus	4 issues	Limited series	March – June 2003	John Wagner, Andy Diggle	Dark Horse Comics	Crossover with Judge Dredd.	
Alien (list)	Aliens (2009)	4 issues	Limited series	May – November 2009	John Arcudi	Dark Horse Comics		
Alien (list)	Aliens: Fast Track to Heaven	1 volume	Graphic novel	November 2011	Liam Sharp	Dark Horse Comics	40 page graphic novella.	
Alien (list)	Aliens: Fire and Stone	4 issues	Limited series	September – December 2014	Chris Roberson	Dark Horse Comics	Part of the Fire and Stone crossover storyline with Predator, Alien vs. Predator and Prometheus.	
Alien (list)	Aliens: Defiance	4 issues	Limited series	April 2016 – June 2017	Brian Wood	Dark Horse Comics		
Alien (list)	Aliens: Dead Orbit	4 issues	Limited series	April – December 2017	James Stokoe	Dark Horse Comics		
Alien (list)	Aliens: Dust to Dust	4 issues	Limited series	April 2018 – January 2019	Gabriel Hardman	Dark Horse Comics		
Alien (list)	Aliens: Resistance	4 issues	Limited series	January – April 2019	Brian Wood	Dark Horse Comics		
Alien (list)	Aliens: Rescue	4 issues	Limited series	July – October 2019	Brian Wood	Dark Horse Comics		
Alien (list)	Aliens/Vampirella	6 issues	Limited series	2015 – 2016	Corinna Bechko	Dark Horse Comics, Dynamite Entertainment	Crossover with Vampirella.	
Alien (list)	Aliens: Life and Death	4 issues	Limited series	September – December 2016	Dan Abnett	Dark Horse Comics	Part of the Life and Death crossover storyline with Predator, Alien vs. Predator and Prometheus.	
Alien (list)	Alien 3: The Unproduced Screenplay	5 issues	Limited series	November 2018 – March 2019	William Gibson (screenplay), Johnnie Christmas (adaptation)	Dark Horse Comics	Adaptation of the unproduced 1987 screenplay for Alien 3 written by Gibson.	
Alien (list)	Alien: The Original Screenplay	5 issues	Limited series	August – December 2020	Dan O'Bannon (screenplay), Cristiano Seixas (adaptation)	Dark Horse Comics		
Alien (list)	Alien (2021)	12 issues	Limited series	May 2021 – August 2022	Phillip Kennedy Johnson	Marvel Comics		
Alien (list)	Aliens: Aftermath	1 issue	One-shot	September 2021	Ben Percy	Marvel Comics		
Alien (list)	Alien (2022)	6 issues	Limited series	November 2022 – April 2023	Phillip Kennedy Johnson	Marvel Comics		
Alien (list)	Alien (2023)	5 issues	Limited series	June – October 2023	Declan Shalvey	Marvel Comics		
Alien (list)	Alien (2024)	4 issues	Limited series	January – April 2024	Declan Shalvey	Marvel Comics		
Alien (list)	Alien: Black, White & Blood	4 issues	Limited series	April – July 2024	Collin Kelly, Stephanie Phillips, Ryan Cady, Jackson Lanzing, Paul Jenkins, Stephanie Williams, Cody Ziglar, Steve Foxe, Bryan Hill, Pornsak Pichetshote	Marvel Comics		
Alien (list)	Aliens: What If...?	5 issues	Limited series	May 2024 – September 2024	Hans Rodionoff (#1–4), Leon Reiser (#5)	Marvel Comics		
Alien (list)	Aliens vs. Avengers	4 issues	Limited series	October 2024 – June 2025	Jonathan Hickman	Marvel Comics	Crossover with the Avengers.	
Alien (list)	Alien: Romulus	1 issue	One-shot	December 2024	Zac Thompson	Marvel Comics	Prequel story to Alien: Romulus (2024), revealing the incident that occurred prior to the events of the film; 32 pages total, art by Daniel Picciotto.	
Alien (list)	Alien: Paradiso	5 issues	Limited series	February – June 2025	Steve Foxe	Marvel Comics		
Alien (list)	Alien vs. Captain America	4 issues	Limited series	January – April 2026	Frank Tieri	Marvel Comics	Crossover with Captain America.	
Alien Nation (list)	Alien Nation	1 issue	One-shot	December 1988	Martin Pasko	DC Comics	Adaptation of the original film.	No
Alien Nation (list)	Alien Nation: The Spartans	4 issues	Limited series	1990	Bill Spangler	Adventure Publications		Paperback: 99922-845-3-6/978-99922-845-3-7
Alien Nation (list)	Alien Nation: A Breed Apart	4 issues	Limited series	November 1990 – March 1991	Steve Jones	Adventure Publications		No
Alien Nation (list)	Ape Nation	4 issues	Limited series	February – June 1991	Charles Marshall	Adventure Publications	Crossover with Planet of the Apes.	No
Alien Nation (list)	Alien Nation: The Skin Trade	4 issues	Limited series	March – June 1991	Lowell Cunningham	Adventure Publications		No
Alien Nation (list)	Alien Nation: The Firstcomers	4 issues	Limited series	May – August 1991	Martin Powell	Adventure Publications		No
Alien Nation (list)	Alien Nation: The Public Enemy	4 issues	Limited series	December 1991 – March 1992	Lowell Cunningham	Adventure Publications		No
Alien vs. Predator (Note: Crossover of the Alien and Predator franchises; later the basis of two feature films (Alien vs. Predator (2004) and Aliens vs. Predator: Requiem (2007).) (comics)	Dark Horse Presents #34—36	3 issues	Main feature, serial	November 1989 – February 1990	Randy Stradley	Dark Horse Comics	Three-part storyline; the first part focuses primarily on the Xenomorphs, while the second part is mostly about the Predators, the third and final part is where the crossover is eventually established.	
Alien vs. Predator (comics)	Aliens/Predator: The Deadliest of the Species	12 issues	Limited series	July 1993 – August 1995	Chris Claremont	Dark Horse Comics		
Alien vs. Predator (comics)	Dark Horse Comics #24: "Blood Time"	1 issue	Main feature	September 1994	Randy Stradley	Dark Horse Comics	Part of a flip book issue with James Bond ("Operation Miasma") on the other side of the book cover; Eight pages total.	
Alien vs. Predator (comics)	Aliens vs. Predator: Duel	2 issues	Limited series	March – April 1995	Randy Stradley	Dark Horse Comics		
Alien vs. Predator (comics)	Aliens versus Predator: War	5 issues	Limited series	May 1995 – August 1995	Randy Stradley	Dark Horse Comics	Four regular issues and an issue 0; the story featured in the latter was a prelude to the main series and was originally published as a 14-part serial in Dark Horse Insider (volume 2) #1–14 (January 1992 – January 1993).	
Alien vs. Predator (comics)	Aliens versus Predator: Booty	1 issue	One-shot	January 1996	Barbara Kesel	Dark Horse Comics		
Alien vs. Predator (comics)	Aliens versus Predator: Eternal	4 issues	Limited series	June – September 1998	Ian Edginton	Dark Horse Comics		
Alien vs. Predator (comics)	Aliens vs. Predator: Annual	1 issue	One-shot	July 1999	David Ross ("Hell-Bent"), Ian Edginton ("Pursuit"), Brian McDonald ("Lefty's Revenge"), Mark Schultz ("Chained to Life and Death") and Alex Maleev ("Old Secrets").	Dark Horse Comics	Anthology of five self-contained stories: "Hell-Bent", "Pursuit", "Lefty's Revenge", "Chained to Life and Death" and "Old Secrets", plus a four-page art gallery featuring illustrations by Mike Marcopoulos (#1), Daniel Torres (#2), Hugus Labiano (#3) and Derek Thompson and Brian O'Connell (#4).	
Alien vs. Predator (comics)	Dark Horse Presents #146–147: "The Web"	2 issues	Main feature	September – October 1999	Ian Edginton	Dark Horse Comics		
Alien vs. Predator (comics)	Aliens vs. Predator: Xenogenesis	4 issues	Limited series	December 1999 – March 2000	Andi Watson, Mel Rubi, Mark Lipka, Andrew Pepoy	Dark Horse Comics	Part of the Xenogenesis crossover storyline with Aliens and Predator.	
Alien vs. Predator (comics)	Aliens versus Predator versus The Terminator	4 issues	Limited series	April – July 2000	Mark Schultz	Dark Horse Comics	Crossover with Terminator.	Paperback: 1-56971-568-8/978-1-56971-568-0
Alien vs. Predator (comics)	Witchblade/Aliens/Darkness/Predator: Mindhunter	3 issues	Limited series	November 2000 – February 2001	David Quinn	Dark Horse Comics	Crossovers with Witchblade and The Darkness.	Paperback: 1-56971-615-3/978-1-56971-615-1
Alien vs. Predator (comics)	Overkill: Witchblade/Aliens/Darkness/Predator	2 issues	Limited series	December 2000 – March 2001	Paul Jenkins	Dark Horse Comics	Crossovers with Witchblade and The Darkness.	Volume 1 TP (1-58240-185-3/978-1-58240-185-0); Volume 2 TP (1-58240-219-1/978-1-58240-219-2)
Alien vs. Predator (comics)	Alien vs. Predator: Thrill of the Hunt	1 volume	Graphic novel	September 2004	Mike Kennedy	Dark Horse Comics		
Alien vs. Predator (comics)	Alien vs. Predator: Civilized Beasts	1 volume	Graphic novel	April 2008	Mike Kennedy	Dark Horse Comics		
Alien vs. Predator (comics)	Superman and Batman versus Aliens and Predator	2 issues	Limited series	January – February 2007	Mark Schultz	DC Comics, Dark Horse Comics	Crossover with DC's Superman and Batman, and the third for the former and the sixth for the latter respectively.	Paperback: 1-4012-1328-6/978-1-4012-1328-2
Alien vs. Predator (comics)	Aliens vs. Predator: Three World War	6 issues	Limited series	January – September 2010	Randy Stradley	Dark Horse Comics		
Alien vs. Predator (comics)	Alien vs. Predator: Fire and Stone	4 issues	Limited series	October 2014 – January 2015	Christopher Sebela	Dark Horse Comics	Part of the Fire and Stone crossover storyline with Alien, Predator and Prometheus.	
Alien vs. Predator (comics)	Predator vs. Judge Dredd vs. Aliens: Splice and Dice	4 issues	Limited series	July 2016 – June 2017	John Layman	Dark Horse Comics, IDW Publishing	Crossover with Judge Dredd.	Paperback: 1-5067-0152-3/978-1-5067-0152-3
Alien vs. Predator (comics)	Alien vs. Predator: Life and Death	4 issues	Limited series	December 2016 – March 2017	Dan Abnett	Dark Horse Comics	Part of the Life and Death crossover storyline with Alien, Predator and Prometheus.	
Alien vs. Predator (comics)	Alien vs. Predator: Thicker Than Blood	4 issues	Limited series	December 2019 – March 2020	Jeremy Barlow	Dark Horse Comics		
The Amazing Spider-Man (2012 film series)	The Amazing Spider-Man: The Movie	2 issues	Limited series	August 2012	Tom Cohen	Marvel Comics		The Amazing Spider-Man: The Movie Prelude TP (0-7851-6499-5/978-0-7851-6499-9)
The Amazing Spider-Man (2012 film series)	The Amazing Spider-Man: The Movie Adaptation	2 issues	Limited series	March – April 2014	Tom Cohen	Marvel Comics		
An American Tail	An American Tail: Fievel Goes West	3 issues	Limited series	January – February 1992	D. G. Chichester	Marvel Comics	Adaptation of the eponymous second film.	
Andy Hardy	Movie Comics #3: "Love Laughs at Andy Hardy"	1 issue	Comic story	June 1947	Claude Lapham	Fiction House	Adaptation of the fifteenth film in the series; thirteen pages total.	No
The Animal World	Four Color (series 2) #713	1 issue	One-shot	August 1956	Gaylord DuBois	Dell Comics	Adaptation of the eponymous film.	No
Annie (1982)	Annie	2 issues	Limited series	October – November 1982	Tom DeFalco	Marvel Comics	Adaptation of the eponymous film; first as published in its entirely as Marvel Comics Super Special #23 in Summer 1982.	No
The Apple Dumpling Gang	Walt Disney's Treasury of Classic Tales: The Apple Dumpling Gang	9 installments	Newspaper strip	May 4 – June 29, 1975	Frank Reilly	King Features Syndicate	Adaptation of the eponymous film; art by Mike Arens.	No
The Apple Dumpling Gang	Walt Disney's Treasury of Classic Tales: The Apple Dumpling Gang Rides Again	13 installments	Newspaper strip	March 4 – May 27, 1979	Al Stoffel	King Features Syndicate	Adaptation of the sequel film; art by Richard Moore.	No
The Aristocats	Walt Disney's Treasury of Classic Tales: The Aristocats	16 installments	Newspaper strip	September 6 – December 27, 1970	Frank Reilly	King Features Syndicate	Adaptations of the eponymous film; the art for the strip version was drawn by John Ushler while the art for the book version (32 pages total) was drawn by Al Hubbard.	No
The Aristocats	Walt Disney Productions Presents The Aristocats	1 issue	One-shot	March 1971	Carl Fallberg	Gold Key Comics	Adaptations of the eponymous film; the art for the strip version was drawn by John Ushler while the art for the book version (32 pages total) was drawn by Al Hubbard.	No
The Aristocats	O'Malley and the Alley Cats	9 issues	Ongoing series	April 1971 – January 1974	Carl Fallberg	Gold Key Comics		No
The Aristocats	Walt Disney's Comics and Stories #371, 372, 373	3 issues	Back-up feature (part of an ongoing series)	August 1971, September 1971, October 1971	?	Gold Key Comics	The "Aristokittens", Berlioz, Marie, and Toulouse, were featured in back-up stories spanning three issues: "The Funny Human-Bean" (#371), "The Three Travelers" (#372) and "The New Thing" (#373).	No
The Aristocats	The Aristokittens	9 issues	Ongoing series	October 1971 – October 1975	?	Gold Key Comics	Retitled The Aristokittens and O'Malley the Alley Cat from #3; the first two issues featured guest appearances from legacy Disney characters Jiminy Cricket (from Pinocchio (1940)), Chip 'n' Dale, Dumbo and Scamp (from Lady and the Tramp (1955)).	No
The Aristocats	Walt Disney Comics Digest #35	1 issue	Back-up feature	June 1972	?	Gold Key Comics	The "Aristokittens" are featured in a back-up story "The Aristokittens Meet Tinker Bell", which as the title implies guest featured Tinker Bell from Disney's Peter Pan (1953).	No
The Aristocats	Les classiques du dessin animé en bande dessinée #11: "Les Aristochats"	1 volume	Bande dessinée	March 1994	Didier le Bornec	Club Dargaud - Walt Disney	Redrawn adaptation of the film with new artwork; the art for this version was done by Mario Cortes. 48 pages total.	No
Arizona Legion	Movie Comics #2	1 issue	Photo comics	May 1939	?	Fawcett Comics	Condensed adaptation of the eponymous film.	No
Around the World in 80 Days (1956)	Four Color (series 2) #784	1 issue	One-shot	February 1957	Gaylord DuBois	Dell Comics	Adaptation of the 1956 film based on the eponymous 1872 novel by Jules Verne.	No
Around the World Under the Sea	Dell Movie Classics #12-030-612	1 issue	One-shot	December 1966	Paul S. Newman	Dell Comics	Adaptation of the eponymous film.	No
Asterix	Asterix Conquers Rome; Les Douze travaux d'Astérix	1 volume	Bande dessinée	October 1976	Pierre Tchernia, René Goscinny, Albert Uderzo	Dargaud, Hachette	Adaptation of The Twelve Tasks of Asterix (1976).	
Astro Boy	Astro Boy: The Movie – Official Movie Prequel	#1–4	Limited series	Scott Tipton	IDW Publishing	May – August 2009		Astro Boy: The Movie – Official Movie Prequel TP (1-60010-518-1/978-1-60010-518-0)
Astro Boy	Astro Boy: The Movie – Official Movie Adaptation	#1–4	Limited series	Scott Tipton	IDW Publishing	August – September 2009		Astro Boy: The Movie – Official Movie Adaptation TP (1-60010-517-3/978-1-60010-517-3)
The A-Team	The A-Team: War Stories	4 issues	One-shot	March – April 2010	Chuck Dixon, Erik Burnham	IDW Publishing		Paperback: 1-60010-727-3/978-1-60010-727-6
The A-Team	The A-Team: Shotgun Wedding	4 issues	Limited series	March – April 2010	Joe Carnahan, Tom Waltz	IDW Publishing		Paperback: 1-60010-726-5/978-1-60010-726-9
Atlantis	Atlantis: The Lost Empire	1 volume	Graphic novel	June 2001	Claudio Sciarrone, Sonia Matrone, Matteo De Benedittis	Dark Horse Comics	Adaptation of the eponymous film.	
Atlantis	Disney Adventures (volume 11) #6	1 issue		Michael Stewart	Disney Publishing Worldwide	Summer 2001	Four self-contained stories set aboard the submarine Ulysses: "Audrey Lets Off Some Steam!", "Moliere Digs Dirt!", "Vinny Has a Blast!" and "Sweet’s Fish Story".	No
Atlantis, the Lost Continent	Four Color (series 2) #1188	1 issue	One-shot	May 1961	Eric Freiwald, Robert Schaefer	Dell Comics	Adaptation of the eponymous film.	No
Attack of the Killer Tomatoes	Attack of the Killer Tomatoes: The Comic	1 issue	One-shot	2003	Lawrence Zieske	Killer Tomato Entertainment, Inc.		No
Attack of the Killer Tomatoes	Attack of the Killer Tomatoes	1 issue	One-shot	October 2008	Dale Mettam	Viper Comics		No
Avatar	FCBD 2017: James Cameron's Avatar / Briggs Land: "Brothers"	1 issue	One-shot	May 2017	Sherri L. Smith, Brian Wood	Dark Horse Comics	Free Comic Book Day exclusive.	No
Avatar	Avatar: Tsu'tey's Path	6 issues	Limited series	January – August 2019	Sherri L. Smith	Dark Horse Comics		
Avatar	Avatar: The Next Shadow	4 issues	Limited series	January – April 2021	Jeremy Barlow	Dark Horse Comics		
Avatar	Avatar: Adapt or Die	6 issues	Limited series	May – October 2022	Corinna Bechko	Dark Horse Comics		
Avatar	Avatar: The High Ground	3 volumes	Graphic novels	October – December 2022	Sherri L. Smith	Dark Horse Comics	Prequel to the second film.	

== B ==
Based on	Title	Length	Format	Publication date	Authors	Publisher	Notes	Collected editions
Babes in Toyland (1961)	Four Color (series 2) #1282	1 volume	One-shot	February–April 1962	Ward Kimball, Joe Rinaldi, Carl Fallberg	Dell Comics	Adaptation of the eponymous film.	No
Back to the Future	Back to the Future	25 issues	Ongoing series	October 2015 – October 2017	Bob Gale, John Barber, Erik Burnham	IDW Publishing		
Back to the Future	Back to the Future: Citizen Brown	5 issues	Limited series	May – September 2016	Bob Gale, Erik Burnham	IDW Publishing		
Back to the Future	Back to the Future: Biff to the Future	6 issues	Limited series	January – June 2017	Bob Gale, Derek Fridolfs	IDW Publishing		
Back to the Future	Back to the Future: Tales from the Time Train	6 issues	Limited series	December 2017 – May 2018	Bob Gale, John Barber	IDW Publishing		
Back to the Future	Transformers/Back to the Future	4 issues	Limited series	October 2020 – January 2021	Cavan Scott	IDW Publishing	Crossover with The Transformers.	
Bad Girls Go to Hell	Bad Girls Go to Hell	3 issues	Limited series	December 1992 – February 1993	Mike Shoemaker, Steve Goupil	Aircel Comics	Adaptation of the eponymous film.	
Bambi	Four Color (series 2) #12	1 issue	One-shot	1942	Chase Craig	Dell Comics	Adaptation of the eponymous film.	No
Bambi	Four Color (series 2) #30: "Bambi's Children"	1 issue	One-shot	October 1943	?	Dell Comics	Adaptation of the eponymous 1939 sequel novel, using the Disney character designs.	No
Bambi	Four Color (series 2) #243: "Thumper Follows His Nose"	1 issue	One-shot	September 1949	?	Dell Comics		No
Barb Wire (1996)	Barb Wire Movie Special	1 issue	One-shot	May 1996	Sarah Byam	Dark Horse Comics	Adaptation of the eponymous film.	No
Batman (1989 film series)	Batman	1 issue	One-shot	1989	Dennis O'Neil	DC Comics	Adaptation of the first film.	
Batman (1989 film series)	Batman Returns	1 issue	One-shot	June 1992	Dennis O'Neil	DC Comics	Adaptation of the second film.	
Batman (1989 film series)	Batman Forever	1 issue	One-shot	June 1995	Dennis O'Neil	DC Comics	Adaptation of the third film.	
Batman (1989 film series)	Batman & Robin	1 issue	One-shot	June 1997	Dennis O'Neil	DC Comics	Adaptation of the fourth film.	
Batman (1989 film series)	Batman '89	6 issues	Limited series	August 2021 – July 2022	Sam Hamm	DC Comics		
Batman (1989 film series)	Batman '89: Echoes	6 issues	Limited series	January 2024 – present	Sam Hamm	DC Comics		
Batman: Mask of the Phantasm	Batman: Mask of the Phantasm	1 issue	One-shot	1993	Kelley Puckett	DC Comics	Adaptation of the eponymous film.	No
Batman & Mr. Freeze: SubZero	Batman & Robin Adventures: SubZero	1 issue	One-shot	1998	Kelley Puckett	DC Comics	Adaptation of the eponymous film.	No
Batman Beyond: Return of the Joker	Batman Beyond: Return of the Joker — The Official Comics Adaptation	1 issue	One-shot	February 2001	Darren Vincenzo	DC Comics	Adaptation of the eponymous film.	No
Battle Beyond the Stars	Battle Amongst the Stars	3 issues	Limited series	March – May 2010	Martin Fisher	TidalWave Productions		
Battle of the Bulge	Dell Movie Classics #12-056-606	1 issue	One-shot	June 1966	?	Dell Comics	Adaptation of the eponymous film.	No
Bayonetta: Bloody Fate	Bayonetta: Bloody Fate ベヨネッタ ブラッディフェイト, Beyonetta Buraddi Feito		Serialized manga	November – December 2013	Mizuki Sakakibara	Kodansha	Serialized in Bessatsu Shōnen Magazine.	
Beauty and the Beast (1991)	Disney's Beauty and the Beast (1991)	1 volume	Graphic novel	1991	Bobbi Weiss	W. D. Publications, Inc.	Adaptation of the first film overall.	
Beauty and the Beast (1991)	The New Adventures of Beauty and the Beast	2 issues	Limited series	July – August 1992	John Blair Moore	Disney Comics		No
Beauty and the Beast (1991)	Disney's Beauty and the Beast (1994)	13 issues	Limited series	September 1994 – September 1995	Barbara Slate	Marvel Comics		
Beach Blanket Bingo	Dell Movie Classics #12-058-509	1 issue	One-shot	September 1965	?	Dell Comics	Adaptation of the eponymous film.	No
Bedknobs and Broomsticks	Walt Disney Showcase #6	1 issue	One-shot	January 1972	Mary Virginia Carey	Gold Key Comics	Adaptation of the eponymous film.	No
Beethoven	Beethoven	3 issues	Ongoing series	March – July 1994	Angelo DeCesare	Harvey Comics	The first issue is an adaptation of the sequel film Beethoven's 2nd (1993), the latter two issues are original stories.	No
Ben-Hur	Four Color (series 2) #1052	1 issue	One-shot	November 1959	Eric Freiwald, Robert Schaefer	Dell Comics	Adaptation of the eponymous film.	No
Beowulf (2007)	Beowulf	4 issues	Limited series	October 2007	Chris Ryall	IDW Publishing	Adaptation of the eponymous film.	
Big	Big	1 issue	One-shot	March 1989	Mark Verheiden	Hit Comics	Adaptation of the eponymous film.	No
The Big Circus	Four Color (series 2) #1036	1 issue	One-shot	August–October 1959	Eric Freiwald, Robert Schaefer	Dell Comics	Adaptation of the eponymous film.	No
The Big Country	Four Color (series 2) #946	1 issue	One-shot	August 1958	Paul S. Newman	Dell Comics	Adaptation of the eponymous film.	No
Big Hero 6	Big Hero 6	2 volumes	Graphic novel	March – October 2015	Haruki Ueno	Yen Press		
The Big Land	Four Color (series 2) #812	1 issue	One-shot	August 1957	?	Dell Comics	Adaptation of the eponymous film.	No
Big Red	Walt Disney's Big Red	1 issue	One-shot	November 1962	?	Gold Key Comics	Adaptation of the eponymous film.	No
Big Town	Movie Comics #1	1 issue	Photo comics, comic story	Claude Lapham	Fiction House	December 1946	Condensed adaptation of the eponymous film.	No
Big Town Czar	Movie Comics #4	1 issue	Photo comics, comic story	?	DC Comics	July 1939	Condensed adaptation of the eponymous film.	No
Big Trouble in Little China	Big Trouble in Little China	25 issues	Ongoing series	June 2014 – June 2016	Eric Powell, John Carpenter, Fred Van Lente	Boom! Studios		
Big Trouble in Little China	Big Trouble in Little China/Escape from New York	6 issues	Limited series	October 2016 – March 2017	Greg Pak	Boom! Studios	Crossover with Escape from New York (1981).	Paperback: 1-68415-008-6 / 978-1-68415-008-3
Big Trouble in Little China	Big Trouble in Little China: Old Man Jack	12 issues	Limited series	September 2017 – August 2018	John Carpenter, Anthony Burch	Boom! Studios		
The Big Wheel	Movie Love #1	1 issue	Comic story	February 1950	?	Eastern Color Printing	Adaptation of the eponymous film.	No
Bimbos in Time	Bimbos in Time	1 issue	One-shot	1994		Draculina Publishing	Adaptation of the eponymous film.	No
Bill & Ted	Bill & Ted's Excellent Adventure	1 issue	One-shot	1989	Bob Rozakis	DC Comics	Adaptation of the first film.	
Bill & Ted	Bill & Ted's Excellent Comic Book	12 issues	Ongoing series	December 1991 – November 1992	Evan Dorkin, Tom Brevoort, Mike Kanterovich	Marvel Comics		
Bill & Ted	Bill & Ted's Bogus Journey	1 issue	One-shot	September 1991	Evan Dorkin	Marvel Comics	Adaptation of the second film.	
Bill & Ted	Bill & Ted's Most Triumphant Return	6 issues	Limited series	March – August 2015	Brian Lynch, Ryan North	Boom! Studios		
Bill & Ted	Bill & Ted Go to Hell	4 issues	Limited series	February – May 2016	Brian Joines	Boom! Studios		
Bill & Ted	Bill & Ted Save the Universe	5 issues	Limited series	June – October 2017	Brian Joines	Boom! Studios		
Bill & Ted	Bill & Ted Are Doomed	4 issues	Limited series	September – December 2020	Evan Dorkin	Dark Horse Comics		
Bill & Ted	Bill & Ted Roll the Dice	4 issues	Limited series	June – October 2022	James Asmus, John Barber	Opus		
Bill & Ted	Bill & Ted Present Death	1 issue	One-shot	November 2022	Erik Burnham, John Barber	Opus		Bill & Ted's Holi-Daze TP (1-63872-036-3/978-1-63872-036-2)
Bill & Ted	Bill & Ted's Day of the Dead	1 issue	One-shot	November 2022	Josh Trujillo, John Barber	Opus		Bill & Ted's Holi-Daze TP (1-63872-036-3/978-1-63872-036-2)
Bill & Ted	Bill & Ted's Excellent Holiday Special	1 issue	One-shot	December 2022	John Barber	Opus		Bill & Ted's Holi-Daze TP (1-63872-036-3/978-1-63872-036-2)
The Black Cauldron	Le Journal de Mickey #1744–1745: "Taram et le Chaudron magique"	2 issues	Bande dessinée	Michel Motti	Hachette	October – November 1985	Adaptation of the eponymous film, originally published in French and later translated into English and published in the US by Scholastic Book Services.	The Black Cauldron TP (978-0-590-33796-0)
Black Dynamite	Black Dynamite (2011)	1 issue	One-shot	Brian Ash	Ape Entertainment	April 2011		No
Black Dynamite	Black Dynamite (2013)	3 issues	Limited series	Brian Ash	IDW Publishing	December 2013 – August 2014		
The Black Hole	Walt Disney Productions' The Black Hole	4 issues	Ongoing series	Mary Virginia Carey, Michael Teitelbaum	Gold Key Comics	March 1980 – September 1980	The first two issues were an adaptation of the film, which was first published in its complete form in Walt Disney Showcase #54 two months earlier in January 1980, the latter two issues are a completely original story continuing from where the film story ended; retitled Beyond the Black Hole from #3.	No
Black Jack (1950)	Movie Love #4	1 issue	Comic story	August 1950	?	Eastern Color Printing	Adaptation of the eponymous film.	No
Blackbeard's Ghost	Walt Disney Presents – Blackbeard's Ghost	1	One-shot	June 1968	Mary Virginia Carey	Gold Key Comics	Adaptation of the eponymous film.	No
The Blazing Forest	Movie Love #15	1 issue	Comic story	June 1952	?	Eastern Color Printing	Adaptation of the eponymous film.	No
Black Scorpion	Black Scorpion	4 issues	Limited series	November 2009 – February 2010	Paul J. Salamoff	TidalWave Productions		
Black Scorpion	The Legend of Isis/Black Scorpion	1 issue	One-shot	June 2010	Aaron Stueve	TidalWave Productions	Crossover with The Legend of Isis.	
Blade	Blade: Movie Preview	1 issue	One-shot	June 1997	Marv Wolfman, Gene Colan, Tom Palmer	Marvel Comics	Adaptation of the first film.	
Blade	Blade II: The Official Comic Adaptation	1 issue	One-shot	May 2002	David Goyer, Steve Gerber	Marvel Comics	Adaptation of the second film.	
Blade	Blade: Nightstalking	1 issue	Minicomic	2005	Jimmy Palmiotti, Justin Gray	Marvel Comics	Included as a supplementary bonus for the DVD release of Blade: Trinity; based on the aforementioned third film.	
Blade Runner	Marvel Comics Super Special #22: "Blade Runner"	1 issue	One-shot	September 1982	Archie Goodwin, Al Williamson, Ralph Reese	Marvel Comics	Adaptation of the original film.	
Blade Runner	Blade Runner 2019	12 issues	Limited series	August 2019 – December 2020		Titan Comics		
Blade Runner	Blade Runner 2029	12 issues	Limited series	January 2021 – March 2022		Titan Comics		
Blade Runner	Blade Runner Origins	12 issues	Limited series	April 2021 – July 2022		Titan Comics		
Blade Runner	Blade Runner 2039	12 issues	Limited series	January 2023 – May 2024		Titan Comics		
Blue Montana Skies	Movie Comics #4	1 issue	Photo comics, comic story	July 1939	?	DC Comics	Condensed adaptation of the eponymous film.	No
The Boatniks	Walt Disney Showcase #1	1 issue	One-shot	October 1970	Mary Virginia Carey	Gold Key Comics	Adaptation of the eponymous film.	No
Bombers B-52	Four Color (series 2) #831: "No Sleep till Dawn": The Story of Bombers B-52"	1 issue	One-shot	September 1957	Leo Dorfman	Dell Comics	Adaptation of the eponymous film.	No
Bon Voyage! (1962)	Dell Movie Classics #12-068-212	1 issue	One-shot	December 1962	?	Dell Comics	Adaptation of the eponymous film.	No
The Boy and the Pirates	Four Color (series 2) #1117	1 issue	One-shot	June 1960	Leo Dorfman	Dell Comics	Adaptation of the eponymous film.	No
The Boy from Indiana	Movie Love #3	1 issue	Comic story	June 1950	?	Eastern Color Printing	Adaptation of the eponymous film.	No
Bram Stoker's Burial of the Rats	Bram Stoker's Burial of the Rats	3 issues	Limited series	April – June 1995	Jerry Prosser	Roger Corman's Cosmic Comics	Adaptation of the eponymous film.	No
Bram Stoker's Dracula (1992)	Bram Stoker's Dracula: Official Comics Adaptation of the Francis Ford Coppola Film	4 issues	Limited series	October 1992 – January 1993	Roy Thomas	Topps Comics	Adaptation of the eponymous film.	
The Brave One (1956)	Four Color (series 2) #773	1 issue	One-shot	February 1957	?	Dell Comics	Adaptation of the eponymous film.	No
Brave Warrior	Motion Picture Comics #112	1 issue	One-shot, comic story	September 1952	Leo Dorfman	Fawcett Comics	Adaptation of the eponymous film.	No
The Brigand	Fawcett Movie Comic #18	1 issue	One-shot, comic story	August 1952	Leo Dorfman	Fawcett Comics	Adaptation of the eponymous film.	No
Bubba Ho-Tep	Bubba Ho-Tep and the Cosmic Blood-Suckers	5 issues	Limited series	March – July 2018	Joshua Jabcuga	IDW Publishing		
Bubba Ho-Tep	Army of Darkness/Bubba Ho-Tep	4 issues	Limited series	February 2019 – June 2019	Scott Duvall	Dynamite Entertainment	Crossover with Army of Darkness.	Paperback: 1-5241-1255-0 / 978-1-5241-1255-4
Buffy the Vampire Slayer	Buffy the Vampire Slayer: The Origin	3 issues	Limited series	January – March 1999		Dark Horse Comics	Adaptation of Joss Whedon's original screenplay for the eponymous 1992 film.	

== C ==
Based on	Title	Length	Format	Publication date	Authors	Publisher	Notes	Collected editions
The Cabinet of Dr. Caligari	Caligari 2050	3 issues	Limited series	January – March 1992		Monster Comics		
The Cabinet of Dr. Caligari	The Cabinet of Dr. Caligari	3 issues	Limited series	April – September 1992		Monster Comics		
The Cabinet of Dr. Caligari	Caligari 2050: Another Sleepless Night...	1 issue			1993	Monster Comics		
The Cabinet of Dr. Caligari	The Cabinet of Doctor Caligari	2 issues	Limited series	January – March 2017		Amigo Comics		
Caged Heat	Caged Heat 3000	3 issues	Limited series	Jerry Prosser	November 1995 – January 1996	Roger Corman's Cosmic Comics	Adaptation of the eponymous third film in the series.	No
Candleshoe	Walt Disney's Treasury of Classic Tales: "Candleshoe"	13 installments	Newspaper strip	December 4, 1977 – February 26, 1978	Carl Fallberg, Al Stoffel	King Features Syndicate	Adaptation of the eponymous film.	No
Captain America (1990)	Captain America: The Movie!	1 issue	One-shot	May 1992	Stan Lee	Marvel Comics	Adaptation of the eponymous 1990 film based on the character created by Joe Simon and Jack Kirby.	No
Captain Fury	Movie Comics #4	1 issue	Photo comics, comic story	July 1939	?	DC Comics	Condensed adaptation of the eponymous film.	No
Captain Kronos – Vampire Hunter	Hammer's Halls of Horror #20	1 issue	Comic story	March 1978	Steve Moore	Top Sellers Ltd.	Adaptations of the eponymous film; the former is a straight strip adaptation while the latter is a limited series expanding on the plot.	
Captain Kronos – Vampire Hunter	Captain Kronos – Vampire Hunter (2017)	4 issues	Limited series	October 2017 – January 2018	Dan Abnett	Titan Comics	Adaptations of the eponymous film; the former is a straight strip adaptation while the latter is a limited series expanding on the plot.	
Captain Sindbad	Captain Sindbad	1 issue	One-shot	September 1963	Eric Freiwald, Robert Schaefer	Gold Key Comics	Adaptation of the eponymous film.	No
Carbine Williams	Fawcett Movie Comic #19	1 issue	One-shot	October 1952	Leo Dorfman	Fawcett Comics	Adaptation of the eponymous film.	No
Cars	The World of Cars: The Rookie	4 issues	Limited series	March – September 2009	Alan J. Porter	Boom! Studios		
Cars	The World of Cars: Radiator Springs	4 issues	Limited series	July – October 2009	Alan J. Porter	Boom! Studios		
Cars	Cars (2009)	7 issues	Limited series	November 2009 – June 2010	Alan J. Porter, Mark Cooper	Boom! Studios		
Cars	Cars: Adventures of Tow Mater	4 issues	Limited series	July – December 2010	Keith R. A. DeCandido	Boom! Studios		
Cars	Cars 2: The Story of the Movie in Comics!	2 issues	Limited series	July – August 2011	Alessandro Ferrari	Marvel Comics	Adaptation of the second film.	
Cars	Cars 3: Movie Graphic Novel	1 volume	Graphic novel	June 2017	?	Joe Books Inc.	Adaptation of the third film.	Paperback: ISBN 1-77275-503-6 / ISBN 978-1-77275-503-9
Casper	Casper	1 issue	One-shot	July 1995	Angelo DeCesare	Marvel Comics	Adaptation of the 1995 film based on the character created by Seymour Reit.	No
The Castilian	Dell Movie Classics #12-110-401	1 issue	One-shot	November 1963-January 1964	?	Dell Comics	Adaptation of the eponymous film.	No
The Cat (1966)	Dell Movie Classics #12-109-612	1 issue	One-shot	December 1966	?	Dell Comics	Adaptation of the eponymous film.	No
The Cat from Outer Space	Walt Disney's Treasury of Classic Tales: "The Cat from Outer Space"	13 installments	Newspaper strip	March 5 – May 28, 1978	Carl Fallberg	King Features Syndicate	Adaptations of the eponymous film.	No
The Cat from Outer Space	Walt Disney Showcase #46	1 issue	One-shot	October 1978	Mary Virginia Carey	Gold Key Comics	Adaptations of the eponymous film.	No
Catwoman	Catwoman: The Movie	1 issue	One-shot	July 2004	Chuck Austen	DC Comics	Adaptation of the eponymous film.	Catwoman: The Movie & Other Cat Tales TP (1-4012-0336-1)
Chakra: The Invincible	Chakra: The Invincible	7 issues	Limited series	July 22, 2015 – January 21, 2016	Stan Lee, Sharad Devarajan, Scott Peterson, Ashwin Pande	Graphic India		
Cheyenne Autumn	Dell Movie Classics #112	1 issye	One-shot	April–June 1965	Don Segall	Dell Comics	Adaptation of the eponymous film.	No
Child's Play	Child's Play 2	3 issues	Limited series	January – March 1991	Andy Mangels	Innovation Publishing	Adaptation of the second film.	
Child's Play	Child's Play (1991)	5 issues	Limited series	May – December 1991	Andy Mangels	Innovation Publishing		
Child's Play	Child's Play 3	3 issues	Limited series	January – March 1992	Andy Mangels	Innovation Publishing	Adaptation of the third film.	
Child's Play	Hack/Slash vs. Chucky	1 issue	One-shot	March 2007	Tim Seeley	Devil's Due Publishing	Crossover with Hack/Slash.	
Child's Play	Chucky (volume 1)	4 issues	Limited series	April – November 2007	Brian Pulido	Devil's Due Publishing		
Child's Play	Chucky (volume 2)	1 issue	Limited series (planned)	February 2009	Jason M. Burns	Devil's Due Publishing		
Chitty Chitty Bang Bang	Chitty Chitty Bang Bang	1 issue	One-shot	February 1969	Gary Poole	Gold Key Comics	Adaptation of the eponymous film.	No
A Chump at Oxford	Movie Comics #6	1 issue	Photo comics, comic story	October 1939	?	DC Comics	Condensed adaptation of the eponymous film.	No
Cinderella (1950).	Four Color (series 2) #272	1 issue	One-shot	April 1950	Chase Craig	Dell Comics	Adaptation of the eponymous film.	No
Cinderella (1950).	"Gus and Jaq Save the Ship"	1 issue	Minicomic	1951	?	Western Publishing Company	Wheaties cereal premium.	No
Cinderella (1950).	Cinderella in "Fairest of the Fair"	1 issue	Minicomic		1955	Western Publishing Company	American Dairy Association premium.	No
Cinderella (1950).	Walt Disney's Treasury of Classic Tales: "Gus & Jaq"	9 installments	Newspaper strip	February 3 – March 31, 1957	Frank Reilly	King Features Syndicate		No
Cinderella (1950).	Walt Disney's Treasury of Classic Tales: "Cinderella: Bibbidi-Bobbodi-Who?"	9 installments	Newspaper strip	July 1 – September 23, 1984	Tom Yakutis	King Features Syndicate		No
Cinderella (1950).	Les Classiques du dessin animé en bande dessinée #24: "Cendrillon"	1 volume	Bande dessinée	February 1, 1998	Régis Maine	Dargaud	Adaptation of the eponymous film; originally published in French and later adapted into English by Dark Horse Comics on February 12, 2020, as Cinderella: The Story of the Movie in Comics.	Hardcover: 2908-80345-3 / 978-2908-80345-7
Circus World	Dell Movie Classics #12-115-411	1 issue	One-shot	September–November 1964	?	Dell Comics	Adaptation of the eponymous film.	No
City Under the Sea	Dell Movie Classics #12-900-509: "War-Gods of the Deep"	1 issue	One-shot	July–September 1965	?	Dell Comics	Adaptation of the eponymous film, under the alternate American title.	No
Clash of the Titans	Clash of the Titans	1 volume	Graphic novel	1981	Mary Virginia Carey	Western Publishing	Adaptation of the eponymous 1981 film.	Paperback: ISBN 0-307-11290-X / ISBN 978-0-307-11290-3
Clash of the Titans	Wrath of the Titans	4 issues	Limited series	May 2007 – May 2008	Darren G. Davis, Scott Davis	TidalWave Productions		
Clash of the Titans	Wrath of the Titans: Cyclops	1 issue	One-shot	January 2009	Matt Frank	TidalWave Productions		
Clash of the Titans	Wrath of the Titans: Revenge of Medusa	3 issues	Limited series	April – July 2011		TidalWave Productions		
Close Encounters of the Third Kind	Marvel Comics Super Special #3	1 issue	Magazine	June 1978	Archie Goodwin	Marvel Comics	Adaptation of the eponymous film.	
Cloverfield	Cloverfield/Kishin	4 chapters	Serialized manga	January – May 2008	David Baronoff, Matthew Pitts, Nicole Phillips	Kadokawa Shoten		
The Comancheros	Four Color (series 2) #1300	1 issue	One-shot	February–April 1962	?	Dell Comics	Adaptation of the eponymous film.	
Conan the Barbarian	Conan the Barbarian (1982)	2 issues	Limited series	October – November 1982	John Buscema, Michael Fleisher	Marvel Comics	Adaptation of the 1982 film; first published Marvel Comics Super Special #21 in August 1982.	
Conan the Barbarian	Conan the Destroyer	2 issues	Limited series	January – March 1985	Michael Fleisher	Marvel Comics	Adaptation of the sequel film; first published as Marvel Comics Super Special #35 in December 1984.	
Conan the Barbarian	Conan the Barbarian: The Mask of Acheron	1 issue	One-shot	July 2011	Stuart Moore	Dark Horse Comics	Adaptation of the 2011 film.	
Condorman	Walt Disney Productions' Condorman	3 issues	Limited series	November 1981 – February 1982	George Kashdan	Gold Key Comics	The first two issues are an adaptation of the film, the third issue is a completely original story, titled "Safe at Last?" (32 pages), which continues where the film's plot left off.	No
Coneheads	Coneheads	4 issues	Limited series	June – September 1994	Terry Collins	Marvel Comics	Adaptation of the 1993 film based on the SNL comedy sketches created by Lorne Michaels.	No
The Conqueror	Four Color (series 2) #690	1 issue	One-shot	April 1956	?	Dell Comics	Adaptation of the eponymous film.	No
Constantine	Constantine: The Official Movie Adaptation	1 issue	One-shot	January 2005	Steven T. Seagle	Vertigo	Adaptation of the 2004 film based on the character created by Alan Moore, Steve Bissette and John Totleben.	
Cool World	Cool World	4 issues	Limited series	April – September 1992	Michael Eury	DC Comics	Prequel to the eponymous film.	No
Cool World	Cool World: The Official Comic Adaptation of the Paramount Animated/Live-Action Film	1 issue	November 1992	One-shot	Michael Eury	DC Comics	Adaptation of the eponymous film overall.	No
Copper Canyon	Copper Canyon	1 issue	One-shot	1950	Joe Millard	Fawcett Comics	Adaptation of the eponymous film.	No
Countdown (1967)	Dell Movie Classics #12-150-710	1 issue	One-shot	October 1967	?	Dell Comics	Adaptation of the eponymous film.	
Creature from the Black Lagoon	Dell Movie Classics #12-142-302: "The Creature"	1 issue	One-shot	December 1962-February 1963	?	Dell Comics	Alternate telling overall of the 1954 film.	No
Creature from the Black Lagoon	Universal Monsters: Creature from the Black Lagoon	1 issue	One-shot	August 1993	Steve Moncuse	Dark Horse Comics	Adaptation of the 1954 film.	No
Creepshow	Creepshow	1 volume	Graphic novel	July 1982	Stephen King, Bernie Wrightson (uncredited)	Plume	Adaptation of the eponymous film.	Paperback: ISBN 0-452-25380-2 / ISBN 978-0-452-25380-3
Cripple Creek	Motion Picture Comics #114	1 issue	One-shot	January 1953	Leo Dorfman	Fawcett Comics	Adaptation of the eponymous film.	No
Crosswinds	Movie Love #11	1 issue	Comic story	October 1951	?	Eastern Color Printing	Adaptation of the eponymous film.	No
The Crow	The Crow: City of Angels	3 issues	Limited series	July – September 1996	John Wagner	Kitchen Sink Press	Adaptation of the eponymous second film in The Crow film series.	
The Curse of Frankenstein	The House of Hammer #2—3	2 issues	Comic story, serial	November – December 1976	Donne Avenell	Top Sellers Ltd.	Adaptation of the eponymous first film in the Hammer Frankenstein series.	
The Curse of the Werewolf	The House of Hammer #10	1 issue	Comic story	July 1977	Steve Moore	Top Sellers Ltd.	Adaptation of the eponymous film.	

== D ==
Based on	Title	Length	Format	Publication date	Authors	Publisher	Notes	Collected editions
Dakota Lil	Dakota Lil	1 issue	One-shot	1949	Joe Millard	Fawcett Comics	Adaptation of the eponymous film.	No
Darby O'Gill and the Little People	Walt Disney's Treasury of Classic Tales: Darby O'Gill and the Little People	13 installments	Newspaper strip	May 3 – August 2, 1959	Frank Reilly	King Features Syndicate	Adaptations of the eponymous film; the art for the newspaper strip was done by Jesse Marsh, while the art for the Four Color book was drawn and inked by Alex Toth.	No
Darby O'Gill and the Little People	Four Color (series 2) #1024	1 issue	One-shot	August–October 1959	?	Dell Comics	Adaptations of the eponymous film; the art for the newspaper strip was done by Jesse Marsh, while the art for the Four Color book was drawn and inked by Alex Toth.	No
Daredevil	Daredevil: The Official Adaptation of the Hit Movie!	1 issue	One-shot	March 2003	Bruce Jones	Marvel Comics	Adaptation of the eponymous 2003 film.	Daredevil: The Official Comic Adaptation TP (0-7851-0959-5 / 978-0-7851-0959-4)
The Dark	The Dark	1 issue	One-shot	1993	Mark Dwyer	Norstar Comics	Adaptation of the 1993 film.	No
The Dark Crystal	The Dark Crystal	2 issues	Limited series	April – May 1983	David Anthony Kraft	Marvel Comics	Adaptation of the original film; first published as Marvel Comics Super Special #24 in March 1983.	
The Dark Crystal	Legends of the Dark Crystal	2 volumes	OEL manga	November 2007 – August 2010	Barbara Randall Kesel	Tokyopop		
The Dark Crystal	The Dark Crystal: Creation Myths	3 volumes	Graphic novel	November 2011 – October 2015	Brian Holguin, Brian Froud	Boom! Studios, Archaia Entertainment		
The Dark Crystal	The Power of the Dark Crystal	12 issues	Limited series	February 2017 – March 2018	Simon Spurrier	Boom! Studios, Archaia Entertainment	Sequel comic to the film; based on the eponymous unproduced screenplay written by David Odell, Annette Odell and Craig Pearce.	
The Dark Crystal	Beneath the Dark Crystal	12 issues	Limited series	July 2018 – August 2019	Adam Smith	Boom! Studios, Archaia Entertainment	Sequel to The Power of the Dark Crystal.	
The Dark Knight Trilogy	Batman Begins: The Official Movie Adaptation	1 issue	One-shot	August 2005	Scott Beatty	DC Comics	Adaptation of the eponymous film, the only film in the series ever to get a comic book adaptation.	Batman Begins: The Movie and Other Tales of the Dark Knight TP (1-4012-0440-6/978-1-4012-0440-2)
The Dark Knight Trilogy	Inner Demons	1 issue	Motion comic	2005	David Goyer	DC Comics, Warner Home Video		No
The Dark Knight Trilogy	The Dark Knight Prologue	1 issue	Motion comic	2008	James Peaty	DC Comics, Warner Home Video		No
The Dark Knight Trilogy	The Dark Knight Rises Prologue	1 issue	Motion comic	2012	Joshua Williamson	DC Comics, Warner Home Video		No
Darkman	Darkman: The Official Comics Adaptation of the Spectacular New Movie	3 issues	Limited series	September 1990	Ralph Macchio	Marvel Comics	Adaptation of the original film; first published in its entirety in a magazine format in September 1990.	No
Darkman	Darkman	6 issues	Limited series	April 1993 – September 1993	Kurt Busiek	Marvel Comics	Sequel series to the adaptation.	No
Darkman	Darkman vs. Army of Darkness	4 issues	Limited series	August 2006 – March 2007	Roger Stern, Kurt Busiek	Dynamite Entertainment	Crossover with Army of Darkness.	Paperback: 1-933305-48-7 / 978-1-933305-48-6
Darkness Falls (2003)	Darkness Falls: The Tragic Life of Matilda Dixon	1 issue	One-shot	January 2003	Joe Harris	Dark Horse Comics	Prequel to the eponymous film.	No
David and Goliath (1960)	Four Color (series 2) #1205	1 issue	One-shot	August–October 1961	?	Dell Comics	Adaptation of the eponymous film.	
Davy Crockett, Indian Scout	Cowboy Western Comics #26	1 issue	Main feature	January 1950	?	Charlton Comics	Adaptations of the eponymous 1950 film, accomplished by different creatives and published in two unrelated magazines.	No
Davy Crockett, Indian Scout	Movie Love #2	1 issue	Main feature	April 1950	?	Eastern Color Printing	Adaptations of the eponymous 1950 film, accomplished by different creatives and published in two unrelated magazines.	No
Dear Brat	Movie Love #10	1 issue	Main feature	August 1951	?	Eastern Color Printing	Adaptation of the eponymous film.	No
Death Race 2000	Death Race 2020	8 issues	Limited series	April – November 1995	Pat Mills, Tony Skinner	Roger Corman's Cosmic Comics	Sequel comic set twenty years after the events of the original 1975 film.	No
Deathsport	The Deathsport Games	3 issues	Limited series	November 2010 – January 2011	Mark L. Miller	TidalWave Productions		No
Debbie Does Dallas	Debbie Does Dallas	18 issues	Ongoing series	March 1991 – February 1993	Bern Harkins, John Coctoasten	Aircel Comics		No
Debbie Does Dallas	Debbie Does Dallas 3-D!	1 issue	One-shot	May 1992	John Coctoasten	Aircel Comics	Published in anaglyph 3D.	No
Debbie Does Dallas	Debbie Does Comics	3 issues	Limited series	February – April 1992	R. A. Jones	Aircel Comics		No
The Deep	The Deep (ザ・ディープ)	1 issue	Magazine	August 1977	Gōsaku Ota	Akita Shoten	Gekiga adaptation of the eponymous 1977 film; Published in Monthly Shōnen Champion.	No
The Deep	A Marvel Movie Special – The Deep	1 issue	One-shot	November 1977	Doug Moench	Marvel Comics	Adaptation of the eponymous film.	No
Demolition Man	Demolition Man	4 issues	Limited series	November 1993 – February 1994	Gary Cohn	DC Comics	Adaptation of the eponymous film.	No
Demonic Toys	Demonic Toys: Play at Your Own Risk!	4 issues	Limited series	January – August 1992	Doug Campbell	Eternity Comics	Sequel comic set eight years after the events of the original film.	No
Destination Moon	Destination Moon	1 issue	One-shot	1950	Otto Binder	Fawcett Comics	Adaptation of the eponymous film.	No
The Devil and Max Devlin	Walt Disney's Treasury of Classic Tales: The Devil and Max Devlin	13 installments	Newspaper strip	August 31 – November 23, 1980	Al Stoffel	King Features Syndicate	Adaptation of the eponymous film; art by Richard Moore.	No
The Devil's Rejects	The Devil's Rejects	1 issue	One-shot	August 2005	Rob Zombie	IDW Publishing	Promotional comic, the book features three stories tied in to the film: "Top Secret Clown Business", "Carnival Kill Ride" and "Psycho-babble".	No
Dick Tracy (1990)	Dick Tracy	3 issues	Limited series	March – May 1990	John Francis Moore	W. D. Publications, Inc.	Adaptation of the eponymous 1990 film.	Dick Tracy: The Complete True Hearts and Tommy Guns Trilogy TP (1-56115-004-5 / 978-1-56115-004-5)
Die Hard	Die Hard: Year One	8 issues	Limited series	August 2009 – March 2010	Howard Chaykin	Boom! Studios	Prequel comic set twelve years before the events of the first film.	List: Volume 1: Hardcover (1-60886-506-1/978-1-60886-506-2); Trade paperback (1-60886-623-8/978-1-60886-623-6); Volume 2: Hardcover (1-60886-515-0/978-1-60886-515-4); Trade paperback (1-60886-632-7/978-1-60886-632-8)
Die Hard	A Million Ways to Die Hard	1 volume	Graphic novel	October 16, 2018	Frank Tieri	Insight Comics		Hardcover: 1-60887-975-5 / 978-1-60887-975-5
Die, Monster, Die!	Dell Movie Classics #12-175-603	1 issue	One-shot	March 1966	Joe Gill	Dell Comics	Adaptation of the eponymous film.	No
Dinosaurus!	Four Color (series 2) #1120	1 issue	One-shot	August–October 1960	Eric Freiwald, Robert Schaefer	Dell Comics	Adaptation of the eponymous film.	No
The Dirty Dozen	Dell Movie Classics #12-180-710	1 issue	One-shot	October 1967	?	Dell Comics	Adaptation of the eponymous film.	No
Django Unchained	Django Unchained	7 issues	Limited series	February – October 2013	Reginald Hudlin, Danijel Zezelj	DC Comics/Vertigo	Adaptation of the eponymous film.	
Django Unchained	Django/Zorro	7 issues	Limited series	November 2014 – May 2015	Quentin Tarantino, Matt Wagner	DC Comics/Vertigo, Dynamite Entertainment	Sequel to the adaptation and crossover with Zorro.	
A Dog of Flanders (1959)	Four Color (series 2) #1088	1 issue	One-shot	April–June 1960	Eric Freiwald, Robert Schaefer	Dell Comics	Adaptation of the 1959 film, itself based on the 1872 novel by Ouida.	No
Dollars Trilogy	The Man with No Name	11 issues	Limited series	May 2008 – June 2009	Christos Gage	Dynamite Entertainment		Vol. 1: Sinners and Saints TP (1-60690-012-9/978-1-60690-012-3); Vol. 2: Holiday in the Sun TP (1-60690-131-1/978-1-60690-131-1)
Dollars Trilogy	The Good, the Bad and the Ugly	8 issues	Limited series	July 2009 – February 2010	Chuck Dixon	Dynamite Entertainment		Paperback: 1-60690-124-9/978-1-60690-124-3
Dollman	Dollman	4 issues	Limited series	September 1991 – 1992	Bill Spangler	Eternity Comics		No
Dollman	Dollman Kills the Full Moon Universe	6 issues	Limited series	August 2018 – January 2019	Brockton McKinney, Shawn Gabborin	Full Moon Comix		No
Donald Duck	Four Color (series 2) #1051: "Donald in Mathmagic Land"	1 issue	One-shot	August–October 1959	Don R. Christensen	Dell Comics	Adaptation of the eponymous film.	No
Donald Duck	Four Color (series 2) #1190: "Donald and the Wheel"	1 issue	One-shot	December 1964-February 1962	Carl Fallberg	Dell Comics	Adaptation of the eponymous film.	No
Dondi	Four Color (series 2) #1176	1 issue	One-shot	January–March 1961	Gaylord DuBois	Dell Comics	Adaptation of the eponymous film, itself based on the comic strip created by Gus Edson and Irwin Hasen.	No
Don't Give Up the Ship	Four Color (series 2) #1049	1 issues	One-shot	August–October 1959	Eric Freiwald, Robert Schaefer	Dell Comics	Adaptation of the eponymous film.	No
Dr. Giggles	Dr. Giggles	2 issues	Limited series	October 1992	Steven Grant	Dark Horse Comics	Adaptation of the eponymous film.	No
Dr. Who and the Daleks	Dell Movie Classics #12-190-612	1 issue	One-shot	December 1966	?	Dell Comics	Adaptation of the eponymous film, itself based on the TV serial The Daleks (1963–1964) from Doctor Who; reprinted in Doctor Who Classic Comics #9 by Marvel UK on July 21, 1993.	No
Dracula (Hammer film series)	The House of Hammer #1: " Dracula"	1 issue	Main feature	October 1976	Dez Skinn	Top Sellers Ltd.	Adaptation of the first film.	No
Dracula (Hammer film series)	The House of Hammer #4: "The Legend of the 7 Golden Vampires"	1 issue	Main feature	January 1977	Steve Moore	Top Sellers Ltd.	Adaptation of the ninth film.	No
Dracula (Hammer film series)	The House of Hammer #6: "Dracula: Prince of Darkness"	1 issue	Main feature	March 1977	Donne Avenell	Top Sellers Ltd.	Adaptation of the third film.	No
Dracula (Hammer film series)	Halls of Horror #27—28: "The Brides of Dracula"	2 issues	Main feature, serial	1983	Steve Moore	Quality Communications	Adaptation of the second film.	No
Dracula (Universal film series)	Dell Movie Classics #12-231-212	1 issue	One-shot	October–December 1962	Bernhardt J. Hurwood	Dell Comics	The comic features four self-contained stories, the third main feature story, "The Vampire's Curse" (32 pages), features Dracula, the remaining three, "The Rusalki, Water Maidens of Doom", "The Hunters of the Forest" and "Witches' Sabbath" are one page stories.	No
Dracula (Universal film series)	Universal Monsters: Dracula (1993)	1 issue	One-shot	October 1993	Dan Vado	Dark Horse Comics	Adaptation of the original 1931 film; fourth installment in Dark Horse's Universal Monsters comic line.	
Dracula (Universal film series)	Universal Monsters: Dracula (2023)	4 issues	Limited series	October 2023 – January 2024	James Tynion IV	Image Comics		
Dragonheart	Dragonheart	2 issues	Limited series	May – June 1996	David Anthony Kraft	Topps Comics	Adaptation of the eponymous first film.	No
Dragonslayer	Dragonslayer	2 issues	Limited series	October – November 1981	Dennis O'Neil	Marvel Comics	Adaptation of the eponymous film; first published as Marvel Comics Super Special #20 in October 1981.	No
Dragoon Wells Massacre	Four Color (series 2) #815	1 issue	One-shot	July 1957	Leo Dorfman	Dell Comics	Adaptation of the eponymous film.	No
Drum Beat	Four Color (series 2) #610	1 issue	One-shot	January 1955	Paul S. Newman	Dell Comics	Adaptation of the eponymous film.	No
DuckTales the Movie: Treasure of the Lost Lamp	DuckTales the Movie: Treasure of the Lost Lamp	1 volume	Graphic novel	Summer 1990	John Lustig	W.D. Publications, Inc.	Adaptation of the eponymous film.	Paperback: ISBN 1-56115-048-7 / ISBN 978-1-56115-048-9
Dumbo	Four Color (series 1) #17: "Dumbo of the Circus"	1 issue	Main feature (part of an ongoing series)	1941	?	Dell Comics	First adaptation of the original film, running for a total of 39 pages; penciled and inked by Irving Tripp.	No
Dumbo	Four Color (series 2) #49: "Walt Disney's Snow White and the Seven Dwarfs"	1 issue	Back-up feature (part of an ongoing series)	July 1944	Carl Buettner	Dell Comics	Dumbo was guest featured in the twelve-page long back-up story, which also mainly features the Seven Dwarfs and the Huntsman (from Snow White and the Seven Dwarfs); this is the first of four Seven Dwarfs and Dumbo crossover stories.	
Dumbo	Walt Disney's Comics and Stories #49, 55, 61: "The Seven Dwarfs and Dumbo"	3 issues	Back-up feature (part of an ongoing series)	October 1944, April 1945, October 1945	Carl Buettner	Dell Comics	Dumbo was guest featured in all three stories in three issues apart, which mainly feature characters from Snow White and the Seven Dwarfs (1937) (the Dwarfs, the Huntsman and the Wicked Witch respectively); continued from the back-up feature in Four Color #49.	No
Dumbo	Walt Disney's Comics - Cheerios Set Y #3: "Dumbo and the Circus Mystery"	1 issue	Minicomic	Chase Craig	1947	Western Publishing	Cheerios cereal premium.	No
Dumbo	Four Color (series 2) #178: "Walt Disney's Donald Duck"	1 issue	Back-up feature (part of an ongoing series)	Carl Buettner	December 1947	Dell Comics	Dumbo was guest featured in the twelve-page long back-up story of this issue "Santa Claus Land", alongside Doc and Grumpy (from Snow White and the Seven Dwarfs), Willie the Giant (from Fun and Fancy Free) also appears in the story as the antagonist.	No
Dumbo	Four Color (series 2) #234: "Dumbo in "Sky Voyage""	1 issue	One-shot	July 1949	Chase Craig	Dell Comics	The main feature story "Sky Voyage", preceded by a one-page strip guest featuring Thumper (from Bambi) "Masquerade Party" and followed by two nine page strips, "Dumbo and Little Pedro" guest featuring Pedro (from Saludos Amigos) and "Dumbo the Musician", and two one page strips, "Nibbling Elephant Ears" featuring the Big Bad Wolf and "Blowing Bubbles" featuring Hector Hummingbird.	No
Dumbo	Walt Disney's Christmas Parade #1, 4	2 issues	Back-up feature (part of an ongoing series)	?	November 1949, November 1952	Dell Comics	Dumbo was mainly featured in back-up stories in two issues apart: a Dumbo and Pablo Penguin story in #1, guest featuring Pablo the penguin (from The Three Caballeros), and an untitled eight-page story in #4.	No
Dumbo	Walt Disney's Silly Symphonies #4: "Dumbo the Flying Elephant"	1 issue	Main feature (part of an ongoing series)	?	August 1954	Dell Comics	Redrawn adaptation of the film, running for a total of 39 pages; penciled and inked by Al Hubbard.	No
Dumbo	Walt Disney's Disneyland Birthday Party #1	1 issue	Back-up feature (part of a one-shot special)	October 1958	Carl Fallberg	Dell Comics	Dumbo was featured in the untitled ten-page long back-up story, which also featured Honest John and Gideon from Pinocchio (1940), following on from the eponymous nine-page main feature of this issue.	No
Dumbo	Four Color (series 2) #1010: "Grandma Duck's Farm Friends and the Flying Farm Hand"	1 issue	Main feature (part of a one-shot issue)	July–September 1959	Vic Lockman	Dell Comics	Dumbo was guest featured in the eight-page main feature story "The Flying Farm Hand", which mainly features regular Duck universe characters Donald Duck, Huey, Dewey and Louie, Grandma Duck and Gus Goose respectively, also guest featuring Br'er Fox (from Song of the South) as the story's antagonist.	No
Dumbo	Walt Disney's Donald Duck Beach Party #6	1 issue	Back-up feature (part of an ongoing series)	August 1959	Vic Lockman	Dell Comics	Dumbo was guest featured in the ten-page back-up feature story "Elephant Orbit".	No
Dumbo	Walt Disney's Treasury of Classic Tales: Dumbo	13 installments	Newspaper strip	July 4 – September 26, 1965	Frank Reilly	King Features Syndicate	Another redrawn adaptation of the original film; art by John Ushler.	No
Dumbo	Walt Disney's Treasury of Classic Tales: Dumbo, the Substitute Stork	13 installments	Newspaper strip	January 1 – March 25, 1984	Tom Yakutis	King Features Syndicate	Original story; art by Richard Moore.	No
Dumbo	Dumbo: Friends in High Places	1 volume	Graphic novel	March 26, 2019	John Jackson Miller	Dark Horse Comics	Anthology of short stories based on the 2019 film remake.	Paperback: ISBN 1-5067-1268-1 / 978-1-5067-1268-0
Dune	Dune (1984)	3 issues	Limited series	April 1985 – June 1985	Ralph Macchio	Marvel Comics	Adaptation of the 1984 film; first published as Marvel Comics Super Special #36 in April 1985.	
Dune	Dune: The Official Movie Graphic Novel	1 volume	Graphic novel	December 6, 2022	Lilah Sturges	Legendary Comics	Adaptation of the 2021 film.	Hardcover: ISBN 1-68116-110-9 / 978-1-68116-110-5
Dungeons & Dragons: Honor Among Thieves	Dungeons & Dragons: Honor Among Thieves – The Feast of the Moon	1 volume	Graphic novel	March 8, 2023	Jeremy Lambert, Ellen Boener	IDW Publishing	Prequel to the eponymous film.	Paperback: 978-1-68405-911-9

== E ==
Based on	Title	Length	Format	Publication date	Authors	Publisher	Notes	Collected editions
East Side of Heaven	Movie Comics #3	1 issue	Photo comics	June 1939	William Conselman	Fawcett Comics	Condensed adaptation of the eponymous 1939 film.	No
The Eagle and the Hawk (1950)	Feature Films #3	1 issue	One-shot	July–August 1950	?	DC Comics	Adaptation of the eponymous film.	No
Earth vs. the Flying Saucers	Flying Saucers vs. the Earth	4 isdues	Limited series	April — July 2008	Ryan Burton, Alan Brooks	TidalWave Productions		Paperback: 1-60643-567-1 / 978-1-60643-567-0
Edward Scissorhands	Edward Scissorhands	10 issues	Limited series	October 2014 – July 2015	Kate Leth	IDW Publishing	Continuation of the eponymous film.	Edward Scissorhands: The Final Cut HC (1-63140-682-5 / 978-1-63140-682-9)
El Cid	Four Color (series 2) #1259	1 issue	One-shot	March–May 1962	?	Dell Comics		No
El Dorado	Dell Movie Classics #12-240-710	1 issue	One-shot	October 1967	Sal Trapani	Dell Comics	Adaptation of the eponymous film.	No
Elektra (2005)	Elektra: The Official Movie Adaptation	1 issue	One-shot	February 2005	Sean McKeever	Marvel Comics	Adaptation of the eponymous film, itself a spin-off the 2003 Daredevil film.	Elektra: The Movie TP (0-7851-1713-X / 978-0-7851-1713-1)
Elvira: Mistress of the Dark	Elvira: Mistress of the Dark	1 issue	One-shot	May 1988	Sid Jacobson	Marvel Comics	Adaptation of the eponymous film, itself based on the title character from the TV series Elvira's Movie Macabre.	No
Emil and the Detectives	Walt Disney's Emil and the Detectives	1 issue	One-shot	February 1965	?	Gold Key Comics	Adaptation of the eponymous film.	No
Ensign Pulver	Dell Movie Classics #12-257-410	1 issue	One-shot	August–October 1964	Paul S. Newman	Dell Comics	Adaptation of the eponymous film.	No
Escape from New York	The Adventures of Snake Plissken	1 issue	One-shot	January 1997	Len Kaminski	Marvel Comics, Paramount Comics	Published under the Paramount Comics imprint; related to the sequel film Escape from L.A. (1997).	No
Escape from New York	John Carpenter's Snake Plissken Chronicles	4 issues	Limited series	June 2003 – February 2004	William O'Neill	CrossGen, Hurricane Entertainment		Paperback: 1-59314-049-5 / 978-1-59314-049-6
Escape from New York	Escape from New York	16 issues	Ongoing series	December 2014 – April 2016	Christopher Sebela	Boom! Studios		Vol. 1: Escape from Florida TP (1-60886-263-1 / 978-1-60886-263-4); Vol. 2: Escape from Siberia TP (1-60886-264-X / 978-1-60886-264-1); Vol. 3: Escape to New York TP (1-60886-265-8 / 978-1-60886-265-8); Vol. 4: Escape from Cleveland TP (1-60886-867-2 / 978-1-60886-867-4)
Escape from New York	Big Trouble in Little China/Escape from New York	6 issues	Limited series	October 2016 – March 2017	Greg Pak	Boom! Studios	Crossover with Big Trouble in Little China.	Paperback: 1-68415-008-6 / 978-1-68415-008-3
Everything's Ducky	Four Color (series 2) #1251	1 issue	One-shot	January–March 1962	?	Dell Comics	Adaptation of the eponymous film.	No
Evil Dead	Army of Darkness	#1—3	Limited series	November 1992 – October 1993	Sam Raimi, Ivan Raimi	Dark Horse Comics	Adaptation of the third film.	Army of Darkness: Movie Adaptation HC
Evil Dead	Army of Darkness: Ashes 2 Ashes	4 issues	Limited series	July 2004 – January 2005	Andy Hartnell	Devil's Due Publishing, Dynamite Entertainment		Hardcover (0-9749638-8-7 / 978-0-9749638-8-4); Trade paperback (0-9749638-9-5 / 978-0-9749638-9-1)
Evil Dead	Army of Darkness: Shop Till You Drop Dead	4 issues	Limited series	January 2005 – July 2005	James Kuhoric	Devil's Due Publishing, Dynamite Entertainment		
Evil Dead	Marvel Zombies vs. Army of Darkness	5 issues	Limited series	May – August 2007	John Layman	Marvel Comics, Dynamite Entertainment	Crossover with Marvel Zombies.	
Evil Dead	Army of Darkness (2007)	27 issues	Ongoing series	August 2007 – April 2010		Dynamite Entertainment		
Evil Dead	The Evil Dead	4 issues	Limited series	January – April 2008	Mark Verheiden	Dark Horse Comics	Adaptation of the original film.	Paperback: 1-59582-164-3 / 978-1-59582-164-5
Evil Dead	Army of Darkness: Ash's Christmas Horror	1 issue	One-shot	December 2008	Elliot Serrano	Dynamite Entertainment		
Evil Dead	Army of Darkness: Ash Saves Obama	4 issues	Limited series	August – December 2009	Elliot Serrano	Dynamite Entertainment		Paperback:1-60690-108-7 / 978-1-60690-108-3
Evil Dead	Danger Girl and the Army of Darkness	6 issues	Limited series	April 2011 – August 2012	Andy Hartnell	Dynamite Entertainment	Crossover with Danger Girl.	Paperback: 1-60690-246-6 / 978-1-60690-246-2
Evil Dead	Army of Darkness (2012)	13 issues	Limited series	February 2012 – May 2013	Elliot R. Serrano	Dynamite Entertainment		
Evil Dead	Army of Darkness vs. Hack/Slash	6 issues	Limited series	July 2013 – February 2014	Tim Seeley	Dynamite Entertainment	Crossover with Hack/Slash.	Paperback: 1-60690-497-3 / 978-1-60690-497-8
Evil Dead	Ash and the Army of Darkness	8 issues	Limited series	October 2013 – June 2014	Steve Niles	Dynamite Entertainment		Paperback: 1-60690-516-3 / 978-1-60690-516-6
Evil Dead	Army of Darkness: Ash Gets Hitched	4 issues	Limited series	July – November 2014	Steve Niles	Dynamite Entertainment		Paperback: 1-60690-597-X / 978-1-60690-597-5
Evil Dead	Army of Darkness (2014)	#1–5	Limited series	Cullen Bunn	December 2014 – March 2015	Dynamite Entertainment		
Evil Dead	Vampirella/Army of Darkness	4 issues	Limited series	July 2014 – October 2015	Mark Rahner	Dynamite Entertainment	Crossover with Vampirella.	Paperback: 1-60690-837-5 / 978-1-60690-837-2
Evil Dead	Evil Dead 2: Beyond Dead by Dawn	3 issues	Limited series	October – December 2015	Frank Hannah	Space Goat Productions	Related to the second film.	Paperback: 1-941581-33-1 / 978-1-941581-33-9
Evil Dead	Evil Dead 2: Tales of the Ex-Mortis	3 issues	Limited series	December 2015 – February 2016	Justin Peniston, Frank Hannah, Ivan Cohen, Georgia Ball, Jeff Mariotte, Marsheila Rockwell	Space Goat Productions	Related to the second film.	Paperback: 1-64017-200-9 / 978-1-64017-200-5
Evil Dead	Evil Dead 2: Cradle of the Damned	3 issues	Limited series	January – May 2016	Frank Hannah	Space Goat Productions	Related to the second film.	Paperback: 1-64017-092-8 / 978-1-64017-092-6
Evil Dead	Tales of Army of Darkness	1 issue	One-shot	February 2016	Shawn Spurlock, Jim Kuhoric, Robert Napton, Robert Kirkman	Dynamite Entertainment		
Evil Dead	Evil Dead 2: Revenge of Hitler	1 issue	One-shot	March 2016	Ian Edginton	Space Goat Productions		
Evil Dead	Army of Darkness: Furious Road	6 issues	Limited series	March – August 2016	Nancy A. Collins	Dynamite Entertainment		Paperback: 1-60690-837-5 / 978-1-60690-837-2
Evil Dead	Army of Darkness: Ash for President	1 issue	One-shot	September 2016	Elliot Serrano	Dynamite Entertainment	Published as an Election Day special.	
Evil Dead	Evil Dead 2: Revenge of Dracula	1 issue	One-shot	October 2016	Scott Peterson	Space Goat Productions		Revenge of Evil Dead 2 TP (1-64017-062-6 / 978-1-64017-062-9)
Evil Dead	Evil Dead 2: Revenge of the Martians	1 issue	One-shot	October 2016	Ty Templeton	Space Goat Productions		Revenge of Evil Dead 2 TP (1-64017-062-6 / 978-1-64017-062-9)
Evil Dead	Evil Dead 2: Revenge of Jack the Ripper	1 issue	One-shot	October 2016	Georgia Ball	Space Goat Productions		Revenge of Evil Dead 2 TP (1-64017-062-6 / 978-1-64017-062-9)
Evil Dead	Evil Dead 2: Revenge of Krampus	1 issue	One-shot	November 2016	Ian Edington	Space Goat Productions		Revenge of Evil Dead 2 TP (1-64017-062-6 / 978-1-64017-062-9)
Evil Dead	Evil Dead 2: Dark Ones Rising	3 issues	Limited series	October – December 2016	Frank Hannah	Space Goat Productions		Paperback: 1-64017-097-9 / 978-1-64017-097-1
Evil Dead	Evil Dead 2: A Merry Deadite X-Mas	1 issue	One-shot	December 2016	Georgia Ball	Space Goat Productions		
Evil Dead	Evil Dead 2: Revenge of Evil Ed	2 issues	Limited series	February – June 2017	Ian Edington	Space Goat Productions		
Evil Dead	Ash vs. the Army of Darkness	6 issues	Limited series	June – November 2017	Chad Bowers, Chris Sims	Dynamite Entertainment		Paperback: 1-5241-0636-4 / 978-1-5241-0636-2
Evil Dead	KIϟϟ/Army of Darkness	5 issues	Limited series	February – July 2018	Chad Bowers, Chris Sims	Dynamite Entertainment	Crossover with KIϟϟ.	Paperback: 1-5241-0761-1 / 978-1-5241-0761-1
Evil Dead	Death to the Army of Darkness!	5 issues	Limited series	February – September 2020	Ryan Parrott	Dynamite Entertainment		Paperback: 1-5241-1934-2 / 978-1-5241-1934-8
Evil Dead	The Army of Darkness: 1979	5 issues	Limited series	September 2021 – January 2022	Rodney Barnes	Dynamite Entertainment		Paperback: 1-5241-2152-5 / 978-1-5241-2152-5
Evil Dead	Army of Darkness: Forever	13 issues	Limited series	October 2023 – October 2024	Tony Fleecs	Dynamite Entertainment		
Evil Dead	Red Sonja vs. The Army of Darkness	5 issues	Limited series	April 2025 – present	Tim Seeley	Dynamite Entertainment	Crossover with Red Sonja.	
The Expendables	The Expendables	4 issues	Limited series	May – July 2010	Chuck Dixon	Dynamite Entertainment	Prequel set before the original film.	Paperback: 1-60690-172-9 / 978-1-60690-172-4
The Expendables	The Expendables Go to Hell	?	Limited series	August 2021 – present	Chuck Dixon, Richard Meyer, Sylvester Stallone	Splatto Comic		

== F ==
Based on	Title	Length	Format	Publication date	Authors	Publisher	Notes	Collected editions
The Fall of the Roman Empire	The Fall of the Roman Empire	1 issue	One-shot	July 1964	Paul S. Newman	Gold Key Comics	Adaptation of the eponymous film.	No
The Family Next Door	Movie Comics #5	1 issue	Photo comics, comic story	August 1939	?	DC Comics	Adaptation of the eponymous film.	No
Fantastic Four (2005)	Fantastic Four: The Movie	1 issue	One-shot	June 2005	Mike Carey	Marvel Comics	Adaptation of the eponymous film.	Paperback: 0-7851-1809-8 / 978-0-7851-1809-1
Fantastic Voyage	Fantastic Voyage	1 issue	One-shot	February 1967	Paul S. Newman	Gold Key Comics	Adaptation of the eponymous film.	No
The Fastest Gun Alive	Four Color (series 2) #741	1 issue	One-shot	September 1956	Leo Dorfman	Dell Comics	Adaptation of the eponymous film.	No
The FBI Story	Four Color (series 2) #1069	1 issue	One-shot	November 1959	Eric Freiwald, Robert Schaefer	Dell Comics	Adaptation of the eponymous film.	No
Fearless Fagan	Four Color (series 2) #441	1 issue	One-shot	December 1952	?	Dell Comics	Adaptation of the eponymous film.	No
The Fighting Prince of Donegal	The Fighting Prince of Donegal	1 issue	One-shot	January 1967	?	Gold Key Comics	Adaptation of the eponymous film.	No
Final Destination	Final Destination: Sacrifice	1 issue	One-shot	July 2006	Ralph Tedesco, Joe C. Brusha	Zenescope Entertainment	Originally released packaged with the third film's DVD release through select copies sold at Circuit City, later included as a supplementary feature in the Spring Break trade paperback.	No
Final Destination	Final Destination: Spring Break	5 issues	Limited series	March 2006 – April 2007	Mike Kalvoda	Zenescope Entertainment		Paperback: 0-9786874-5-0 / 978-0-9786874-5-8
Finding Nemo	Disney Junior Graphic Novel #1	1 volume	Graphic novel	August 2006	Charles Bazaldua	Disney Press	Adaptation of the original film.	Paperback: 1-4231-0140-5 / 978-1-4231-0140-6
Finding Nemo	Finding Nemo: Reef Rescue	4 issues	Limited series	May – July 2009	Marie Croall	Boom! Studios		Hardcover: 1-60886-524-X / 978-1-60886-524-6; Paperback: 1-934506-88-5 / 978-1-934506-88-2
Finding Nemo	Finding Nemo: Losing Dory	4 issues	Limited series	July – October 2010	Mike Raicht, Brian Smith	Boom! Studios		Paperback: 1-60886-609-2 / 978-1-60886-609-0
Finding Nemo	Finding Nemo: Special Collector's Manga	1 volume	OEL manga	June 2016	Ryuichi Hoshino	Tokyopop	Manga adaptation of the original film.	
Finding Nemo	Finding Dory	4 issues	Limited series	July – October 2016	Scott Peterson	Joe Books Ltd	Adaptation of the sequel film.	Paperback: 1-77275-333-5 / 978-1-77275-333-2
First Men in the Moon (1964)	First Men in the Moon	1 issue	One-shot	March 1965	Dick Wood	Gold Key Comics	Adaptation of the 1964 film version based on the 1901 novel by H. G. Wells.	No
Fisherman's Wharf	Movie Comics #1	1 issue	Photo comics	April 1939	?	DC Comics	Adaptation of the eponymous film.	No
Five Came Back	Movie Comics #5	1 issue	Photo comics	August 1939	?	DC Comics	Adaptation of the eponymous film.	No
The Flame and the Arrow	"The Flame and the Arrow", Knockout #???–???	10 issues	Comic story, serial	27 January 1951 – 31 March 1951	?	Amalgamated Press	Adaptation of the eponymous film.	No
The Flash	The Flash: The Fastest Man Alive	3 issues	Limited series	November 2022 – January 2023	Kenny Porter	DC Comics	Prequel comic to the eponymous film, set in the continuity of the DC Extended Universe.	
Flash Gordon	Flash Gordon: The Movie	1 volume	Graphic novel	May 1980	Michael Allin	Western Publishing	Adaptation of the 1980 film.	
Flesh Gordon	Flesh Gordon	4 issues	Ongoing series	March – July 1992	Daniel Wilson	Aircel Comics		
The Flintstones	The Flintstones #36: "The Man Called Flintstone"	1 issue	Comic story	October 1966	Call Fallberg	Gold Key Comics	Adaptation of the 1966 animated film.	
The Flintstones	The Flintstones: The Official Movie Adaptation in Double Vision	1 issue	One-shot	September 1994	Angelo De Cesare	Harvey Comics	Adaptation of the 1994 live-action film, drawn in both realistic and cartoon styles and published in anaglyph 3-D.	
The Fly	The Fly: Outbreak	5 issues	Limited series	March—July 2015	Brandon Seifert	IDW Publishing	Sequel to The Fly II (1989).	Paperback: 1-63140-443-1 / 978-1-63140-443-6
Forbidden Planet	Forbidden Planet	4 issues	Limited series	May – September 1992	David Campiti	Innovation Publishing	Adaptation of the eponymous film.	Forbidden Planet: The Saga of the Krell TP: 978-1-56521-015-8
Forever, Darling	Four Color (series 2) #681	1 issue	One-shot	February 1956	?	Dell Comics	Adaptation of the eponymous film.	
The Fountain	The Fountain	1 volume	Graphic novel	November 2005	Kent Williams	Vertigo Comics		
Four Faces West	Cowboy Western Comics #24	1 issue	One-shot	August 1949	?	Charlton Comics	Adaptation of the eponymous film.	
The Four Feathers (1939)	Movie Comics #3	1 issue	Photo comics	June 1939	?	Fawcett Comics	Adaptation of the 1939 film version based on the 1902 novel by A. E. W. Mason.	
The Four Horsemen of the Apocalypse (1962)	Four Color (series 2) #1250	1 issue	One-shot	January–March 1962	?	Dell Comics	Adaptation of the eponymous film, plus a one-page supplementary filler summarizing the French Resistance.	
The Fox and the Hound	The Fox and the Hound	3 issues	Limited series	August – October 1981	?	Gold Key Comics	The first two issues were an adaptation of the film, the third issue, titled on the cover as New Adventures of the Fox and the Hound, featured four original stories (all running through 8 pages each) with the main cast, "The Lost Fawn", "Feathered Friends", "The Escape" and "The Chase".	Paperback: 0-307-11292-6
Frankenstein (1910)	Edison's Frankenstein 1910	1 volume	Graphic novel	2003	Chris Yambar	Comic Library International	Adaptation of the 1910 film version, itself based on the 1818 Mary Shelley novel.	
Frankenstein (Universal film series)	Movie Comics #1: "Son of Frankenstein"	1 issue	Photo comics	April 1939	?	DC Comics	Condensed adaptation of the third film.	No
Frankenstein (Universal film series)	Dell Movie Classics #12-283-305	1 issue	One-shot	March–May 1963	Don Segall	Dell Comics	Continuation very loosely based on the 1931 film; also the first issue of a short-lived ongoing series that lasted for four issues, the latter three featuring a superhero character bearing the "Frankenstein" namesake.	No
Frankenstein (Universal film series)	Universal Monsters: Frankenstein	1 issue	One-shot	June 1993	Den Beauvais	Dark Horse Comics	Adaptation of the 1931 film.	
Freaked	Freaked	1 issue	One-shot	1993	John Clark, Gary Leach	Hamilton Comics	Adaptation of the eponymous film.	
Freaks (1932)	Freaks	4 issues	Limited series	May 1992 – March 1993	Jim Woodring	Monster Comics	Adaptation of the eponymous film.	
Freddy vs. Jason	Freddy vs. Jason vs. Ash	6 issues	Limited series	November 2007 – March 2008	Jeff Katz, James Kuhoric	WildStorm, Dynamite Entertainment	Crossovers with Evil Dead.	Paperback: 1-4012-2004-5 / 978-1-4012-2004-4
Freddy vs. Jason	Freddy vs. Jason vs. Ash: The Nightmare Warriors	6 issues	Limited series	August – December 2009	Jeff Katz, James Kuhoric	WildStorm, Dynamite Entertainment	Crossovers with Evil Dead.	Paperback: 1-4012-2752-X / 978-1-4012-2752-4
Freejack	Freejack	3 issues	Limited series	April – June 1992	Chuck Dixon, Clint McElroy	NOW Comics	Adaptation of the eponymous film.	
Friday the 13th	Jason Goes to Hell: The Final Friday	3 issues	Limited series	July – September 1993	Andy Mangels	Topps Comics	Adaptation of the eponymous ninth film.	
Friday the 13th	Jason vs. Leatherface	3 issues	Limited series	October 1995 – January 1996	Nancy A. Collins, David Imhoff	Topps Comics	Non-canonical crossover with The Texas Chain Saw Massacre.	
Friday the 13th	Friday the 13th Special	1 issue	One-shot	April 2005	Brian Pulido, Mike Wolfer	Avatar Press		
Friday the 13th	Friday the 13th: Bloodbath	3 issues	Limited series	October 2005 – March 2006	Brian Pulido	Avatar Press		
Friday the 13th	Jason X	1 issue	One-shot	November 2005	Brian Pulido	Avatar Press	Continuation of the eponymous tenth film.	
Friday the 13th	Friday the 13th: Jason vs. Jason X	2 issues	Limited series	March – June 2006	Mike Wolfer	Avatar Press		
Friday the 13th	Friday the 13th: Fearbook	1 issue	One-shot	June 2006	Mike Wolfer	Avatar Press		
Friday the 13th	Friday the 13th	6 issues	Limited series	February – July 2007	Jimmy Palmiotti, Justin Gray	WildStorm		Friday the 13th TP: 1-4012-1459-2 / 978-1-4012-1459-3
Friday the 13th	Friday the 13th: Pamela's Tale	2 issues	Limited series	Marc Andreyko	September – October 2007	WildStorm		Friday the 13th: Book Two TP: 1-4012-2003-7 / 978-1-4012-2003-7
Friday the 13th	Friday the 13th: How I Spent My Summer Vacation	2 issues	Limited series	Jason Aaron	November – December 2007	WildStorm		Friday the 13th: Book Two TP: 1-4012-2003-7 / 978-1-4012-2003-7
Friday the 13th	Friday the 13th: Bad Land	2 issues	Limited series	Ron Marz	March – April 2008	WildStorm		Friday the 13th: Book Two TP: 1-4012-2003-7 / 978-1-4012-2003-7
Friday the 13th	Friday the 13th: Abuser and the Abused	1 issue	One-shot	Joshua Hale Fialkov	June 2008	WildStorm		Friday the 13th: Book Two TP: 1-4012-2003-7 / 978-1-4012-2003-7
Fright Night	Fright Night (1988)	22 issues	Ongoing series	October 1988 – July 1990	Joe Gentile, Robert Borski, James Van Hise, Tony Caputo, Katherine Llewellyn, Mark Wheatley, Diane Piron	NOW Comics	The first two issues are an adaptation of the original 1985 film.	
Fright Night	Fright Night Part II	1 issue	One-shot	1988	Matthew J. Costello	NOW Comics	Adaptation of the 1988 sequel film.	
Fright Night	Fright Night 3-D Special	1 issue	One-shot	June 1992	Tony Caputo	NOW Comics	Reprint of issues #10-11 with anaglyph 3-D effects.	
Fright Night	Fright Night 3-D Fall Special	1 issue	One-shot	June 1992	Katherine Llewellyn	NOW Comics	Reprint of issues #14-15 with anaglyph 3-D effects.	
Fright Night	Fright Night 3-D Halloween Annual	1 issue	One-shot	October 1993	Diane Piron	NOW Comics	The feature story "Nightmares" was originally planned as a part of the main ongoing series before eventually printed as a standalone special.	
Fright Night	Fright Night 3-D Winter Special	1 issue	One-shot	December 1993	James Van Hise (credited as Joe Gentile)	NOW Comics	Reprint of issue #3 with anaglyph 3-D effects.	
Fright Night	Tom Holland's Fright Night	5 issues	Limited series	James Kuhoric	December 2021 – 2022	American Mythology Productions	A Free Comic Book Day exclusive giveaway issue was published on May 6, 2023.	
From Dusk till Dawn	From Dusk till Dawn	1 volume	Graphic novel	Ed Polgardy	May 1996	Big Entertainment	Adaptation of the original film.	Paperback: ISBN 0-9645175-3-1 / ISBN 978-0-9645175-3-0
Frozen	Frozen: The Story of the Movie in Comics	1 issue	One-shot	January 2015	Alessandro Ferrari	Joe Books Ltd	First adaptation of the original film.	
Frozen	Frozen (2016)	8 issues	Limited series	Georgia Ball	Jul 2016 – Jun 2017	Joe Books Ltd		
Frozen	Frozen 2017 Annual	1 issue	Annual		September 2017	Joe Books Ltd		
Frozen	Frozen: Breaking Boundaries	3 issue	Limited series	August – October 2018	Joe Caramagna	Dark Horse Comics		Paperback: 1-5067-1051-4 / 978-1-5067-1051-8
Frozen	Frozen: Reunion Road	3 issues	Limited series	March – May 2019	Joe Caramagna	Dark Horse Comics		Paperback: 1-5067-1270-3 / 978-1-5067-1270-3
Frozen	Frozen: The Hero Within	3 issues	Limited series	June – September 2019	Joe Caramagna	Dark Horse Comics		Paperback: 1-5067-1269-X / 978-1-5067-1269-7
Frozen	Frozen: True Treasure	3 issues	Limited series	November 2019 – January 2020	Joe Caramagna	Dark Horse Comics		Paperback: 1-5067-1705-5 / 978-1-5067-1705-0
Frozen	Frozen (2020)	1 volume	Graphic novel	March 2020	Cecil Castellucci	Dark Horse Comics	Second adaptation of the original film.	
Frozen	Frozen and Frozen II: The Story of the Movies in Comics	1 volume	Graphic novel	May 2020	Alessandro Ferrari	Dark Horse Comics	The first film adaptation followed by an adaptation of the sequel film.	
Frozen	Frozen II: The Manga	1 volume	OEL manga	August 2022	Arina Tanemura	Viz Media	Manga adaptation of the sequel film.	
Fun and Fancy Free	Walt Disney's Comics and Stories #82, #83, #84: "Bongo"	3 issues		July, August, September 1947	Chase Craig	Dell Comics	Three-part adaptation of Bongo, the first segment of the film.	No
Fun and Fancy Free	Four Color (series 2) #157: "Mickey and the Beanstalk"	1 issue		July 1947	?	Dell Comics	Adaptation of Mickey and the Beanstalk, the second segment of the film, plus a twelve-page back-up story "Pluto Keeps It Quiet".	
Fun and Fancy Free	Four Color (series 2) #706, #886: "Bongo and Lumpjaw"	2 issues		June 1956, March 1958	?	Dell Comics	Spin-off and continuation; the first issue under the title features six main stories, "Caught by a Branch" (1 page),"King Bee Bear" (8 pages), "Kitten Capers" (8 pages), "Won by a Hare" (8 pages), "The Impossible Possum" (8 pages) and "Crocodile Crossing" (1 page), and an activity on the back cover "Bongo's Magic Cage" (A two-piece slide game to cut-out and assemble.), the second issue features seven more main stories, "Hide-and-Go-Seek" (1 page), "The Flip-flop Flyer" (8 pages), "Rockabye Bear" (8 pages), "Good Eggs" (8 pages), "The Little Critter" (8 pages) and two untitled one-page stories.	
Future Shock	Future Shock	1 issue	One-shot	1993	Stephanie Landen	Sci-Fi Comix	Adaptation of the eponymous film.	

== G ==
Based on	Title	Length	Format	Publication date	Authors	Publisher	Notes	Collected editions
Galaxina	Galaxina	4 issues	Limited series	December 1991 – February 1992	Mike Shoemaker	Aircel Comics	Continuation of the eponymous film.	No
Galaxy Quest (comics)	Galaxy Quest: Global Warning	4 issues	Limited series	August – December 2008	Scott Lobdell	IDW Publishing	Sequel story.	Paperback: 1-60010-383-9/978-1-60010-383-4
Galaxy Quest (comics)	Galaxy Quest: The Journey Continues	4 issues	Limited series	January – April 2015	Erik Burnham	IDW Publishing	Second sequel story.	Paperback: 1-63140-356-7/978-1-63140-356-9
Gay Purr-ee	Gay Purr-ee	1 issue	One-shot	January 1963	Carl Fallberg	Gold Key Comics	Adaptation of the eponymous film.	No
Ghostbusters (comics)	The Real Ghostbusters – Starring in Ghostbusters II	3 issues	Limited series	October – December 1989	James Van Hise	NOW Comics	Adaptation of the 1989 sequel film with the cast of the film depicted in their animated TV series designs.	The Real Ghostbusters – Starring in Ghostbusters II TPB
Ghostbusters (comics)	Ghostbusters: Legion	4 issues	Limited series	February 2004 – January 2005	Andrew Dabb	88MPH Studios		
Ghostbusters (comics)	Ghostbusters: Ghost Busted	1 issue	OEL manga	October 2008	Tamashita, Johnson, Delk, Lorenzo, Shelfer, Watson, Steinbach	Tokyopop		
Ghostbusters (comics)	Ghostbusters: The Other Side	5 issues	Limited series	October 2008 – January 2009	Keith Champagne	IDW Publishing		
Ghostbusters (comics)	Ghostbusters: Displaced Aggression	4 issues	Limited series	September – December 2009	Scott Lobdell	IDW Publishing		
Ghostbusters (comics)	Ghostbusters: Past, Present and Future	1 issue	One-shot	December 2009	Rob Williams	IDW Publishing		
Ghostbusters (comics)	Ghostbusters: Tainted Love	1 issue	One-shot	February 2010	Dara Naraghi	IDW Publishing		
Ghostbusters (comics)	Ghostbusters: Con-Volution!	1 issue	One-shot	June 2010	Jim Beard, Keith Dallas	IDW Publishing		
Ghostbusters (comics)	Ghostbusters: What in Samhain Just Happened?!	1 issue	One-shot	October 2010	Peter Allen David	IDW Publishing		
Ghostbusters (comics)	Ghostbusters: Infestation	2 issues	Limited series	March 2011	Erik Burnham	IDW Publishing		
Ghostbusters (comics)	Ghostbusters (series 1)	16 issues	Ongoing series	September 2011 – December 2012	Erik Burnham	IDW Publishing		
Ghostbusters (comics)	Mars Attacks the Real Ghostbusters	1 issue	One-shot	January 2013	Erik Burnham	IDW Publishing	Crossover with Mars Attacks; technically based the animated TV series which in turn was based on the films.	
Ghostbusters (comics)	Ghostbusters (series 2)	20 issues	Ongoing series	February 2013 – September 2014	Erik Burnham	IDW Publishing	First titled The New Ghostbusters from #1–4, then Ghostbusters: Happy Horror Days! from #9–12 and finally Ghostbusters: Mass Hysteria! from #13–20.	
Ghostbusters (comics)	The X-Files: Conspiracy – Ghostbusters	1 issue	One-shot	January 2014	Erik Burnham	IDW Publishing	Crossover with The X-Files; part two of a six-part crossover storyline.	
Ghostbusters (comics)	Teenage Mutant Ninja Turtles/Ghostbusters	4 issues	Limited series	October 2014 – January 2015	Erik Burnham, Tom Waltz	IDW Publishing	First crossover with Teenage Mutant Ninja Turtles.	Paperback: 1-63140-253-6/978-1-63140-253-1
Ghostbusters (comics)	Ghostbusters: Get Real	4 issues	Limited series	June – September 2015	Erik Burnham	IDW Publishing	Crossover with the animated series counterparts.	
Ghostbusters (comics)	Ghostbusters Annual 2015	1 issue	Annual	November 2015	Erik Burnham	IDW Publishing		
Ghostbusters (comics)	Ghostbusters: International	11 issues	Ongoing series	January – November 2016	Erik Burnham	IDW Publishing		
Ghostbusters (comics)	Ghostbusters: Deviations	1 issue	One-shot	March 2016	Kelly Thompson	IDW Publishing	Non-canonical alternate telling of the original film established by a point of divergence; part of IDW's Deviations event comic series.	
Ghostbusters (comics)	Ghostbusters Annual 2017	1 issue	Annual	January 2017	Erik Burnham, Dan Schoening, Tom Waltz	IDW Publishing		
Ghostbusters (comics)	Ghostbusters: 101	5 issues	Limited series	March – August 2017	Erik Burnham	IDW Publishing		
Ghostbusters (comics)	Ghostbusters: Funko Universe	1 issue	One-shot	May 2017	Troy Dye	IDW Publishing		
Ghostbusters (comics)	Ghostbusters: Answer the Call	5 issues	Limited series	October 2017 – February 2018	Kelly Thompson	IDW Publishing	Continuation of the 2016 film.	Paperback: 1-68405-239-4/978-1-68405-239-4
Ghostbusters (comics)	Ghostbusters Annual 2018	1 issue	Annual	February 2018	Erik Burnham	IDW Publishing		
Ghostbusters (comics)	Teenage Mutant Ninja Turtles/Ghostbusters 2	5 issues	Limited series	November 2017	Erik Burnham, Tom Waltz	IDW Publishing	Second crossover with Teenage Mutant Ninja Turtles and sequel to the first crossover.	Paperback: 1-68405-147-9/978-1-68405-147-2
Ghostbusters (comics)	Ghostbusters: Crossing Over	8 issues	Limited series	March – October 2018	Erik Burnham	IDW Publishing		
Ghostbusters (comics)	Ghostbusters: IDW 20/20	1 issue	One-shot	January 2019	Erik Burnham	IDW Publishing		
Ghostbusters (comics)	Ghostbusters 35th Anniversary: Ghostbusters	1 issue	One-shot	April 2019	Erik Burnham	IDW Publishing		
Ghostbusters (comics)	Ghostbusters 35th Anniversary: The Real Ghostbusters	1 issue	One-shot	April 2019	Cavan Scott	IDW Publishing	Technically based the animated TV series which in turn was based on the films.	
Ghostbusters (comics)	Ghostbusters 35th Anniversary: Extreme Ghostbusters	1 issue	One-shot	April 2019	Jim Beard, Keith Dallas	IDW Publishing		
Ghostbusters (comics)	Ghostbusters 35th Anniversary: Ghostbusters: Answer the Call	1 issue	One-shot	April 2019	Devin Grayson	IDW Publishing		
Ghostbusters (comics)	Transformers/Ghostbusters	5 issues	Limited series	June – October 2019	Erik Burnham	IDW Publishing	Crossover with Hasbro's Transformers.	Transformers/Ghostbusters: Ghosts of Cybertron TP (1-68405-620-9/978-1-68405-620-0)
Ghostbusters (comics)	Ghostbusters: Year One	4 issues	Limited series	January – April 2020	Erik Burnham	IDW Publishing		
Ghostbusters (comics)	Ghostbusters: Back in Town	4 issues	Limited series	March – June 2024	David M. Booher	Dark Horse Comics	Set between Afterlife and Frozen Empire.	
G.I. Joe	G.I. Joe: The Rise of Cobra – Official Movie Prequel	4 issues	Limited series	March – June 2009	Chuck Dixon	IDW Publishing	Prequel to the first film.	Paperback: 1-60010-469-X/978-1-60010-469-5
G.I. Joe	G.I. Joe: The Rise of Cobra – Official Movie Adaptation	4 issues	Limited series	July 2009	Denton Tipton	IDW Publishing	Adaptation of the first film.	Paperback: 1-60010-468-1/978-1-60010-468-8
G.I. Joe	G.I. Joe: Retaliation – Official Movie Prequel	4 issues	Limited series	February – April 2012	John Barber	IDW Publishing	Prequel to the second film.	Paperback: 1-61377-203-3/978-1-61377-203-4
The Girl and the Gambler	Movie Comics #5	1 issue	Photo comics, comic story	?	DC Comics	August 1939	Condensed adaptation of the eponymous film.	No
Glory Alley	Movie Love #17	1 issue	Comic story	October 1952	?	Eastern Color Printing	Adaptation of the eponymous film.	No
The Gnome-Mobile	Walt Disney's Treasury of Classic Tales: The Gnome-Mobile	13 installments	Newspaper strip	May 7 – July 30, 1967	Frank Reilly	King Features Syndicate	Adaptations of the eponymous film; the artwork for the strip version was done by John Ushler, while the artwork for the book version was done by Dan Spiegle.	
The Gnome-Mobile	Walt Disney Presents – The Gnome-Mobile	1 issue	One-shot	October 1967	Mary Virginia Carey	Gold Key Comics	Adaptations of the eponymous film; the artwork for the strip version was done by John Ushler, while the artwork for the book version was done by Dan Spiegle.	No
Godzilla	Main article: Godzilla (comics)							
The Golden Voyage of Sinbad	Worlds Unknown #7–8: "The Golden Voyage of Sinbad: Land of the Lost"	2 issues	Main feature, serial	June – August 1974	Len Wein	Marvel Comics	Adaptation of the eponymous film.	No
Goodbye, Mr. Chips (1969)	Goodbye, Mr. Chips	1 issue	One-shot	June 1970	?	Gold Key Comics	Adaptation of the eponymous 1969 film version based on the 1934 novella by James Hilton; presented in two chapters, each 13 pages long.	No
Goofy	Four Color (series 2) #857: "The Goofy Adventure Story"	1 issue	One-shot	November 1957	Vic Lockman	Dell Comics	Adaptation of the films A Knight for a Day (1946), Californy'er Bust and African Diary (both 1945) and For Whom the Bulls Toil (1953).	
Goofy	Le Journal de Mickey #2297–2298: "Dingo et Max"	2 issues	Bande dessinée, serial	June 26 – July 3, 1996		Disney Hachette Presse S.N.C.	Adaptation of A Goofy Movie (1995); originally published in French.	Hardcover: 2-908803-37-2/978-2-908803-37-2
Gorgo	Gorgo	23 issues	Ongoing series	May 1961 – September 1965	Joe Gill	Charlton Comics	The first issue is an adaptation of the film plot overall, the rest is a continuation based on the same film.	
Gorgo	Gorgo's Revenge	3 issues	Limited series	1962 – September 1964	Joe Gill	Charlton Comics	Sequel miniseries; retitled The Return of Gorgo from #2.	
The Gorgon	The House of Hammer #11—12	2 issues	Main feature, serial	August – September 1977	Scott Goodall	Top Sellers Ltd.	Adaptation of the eponymous film.	No
The Great Locomotive Chase	Walt Disney's Treasury of Classic Tales: The Great Locomotive Chase	18 installments	Newspaper strip	April 1 – July 29, 1956	Frank Reilly	King Features Syndicate	Adaptations of the eponymous film; the artwork for the strip version was done by Jesse Marsh, while the artwork for the book version (33 pages total) was done by John Ushler.	
The Great Locomotive Chase	Four Color (series 2) #712	1 issue	One-shot	July 1956	Elizabeth Beecher	Dell Comics	Adaptations of the eponymous film; the artwork for the strip version was done by Jesse Marsh, while the artwork for the book version (33 pages total) was done by John Ushler.	No
The Great Man Votes	Movie Comics #1	1 issue	Photo comics, comic story	April 1939	?	DC Comics	Condensed adaptation of the eponymous film.	No
The Great Mouse Detective	Walt Disney's Treasury of Classic Tales: The Great Mouse Detective	13 installments	Newspaper strip	May 4 – July 27, 1986	Carl Fallberg	King Features Syndicate	Adaptations of the eponymous film; the artwork for the strip version was done by Richard Moore.	
The Great Mouse Detective	Le Journal de Mickey #1797–1800: "Basil, détective privé"	4 issues	Bande dessinée, serial	December 2 – 23, 1986	François Corteggiani	EDI-MONDE S.A.R.L.	Adaptations of the eponymous film; the artwork for the strip version was done by Richard Moore.	Paperback: 2-7333-0283-3
The Great Race	Dell Movie Classics #12-299-603	1 issue	One-shot	March 1966	Paul S. Newman	Dell Comics	Adaptation of the eponymous film.	No
The Green Glove	Movie Love #15	1 issue	Comic story	June 1952	?	Eastern Color Printing	Adaptation of the eponymous film.	No
The Green Hornet (2011)	The Green Hornet: Parallel Lives	5 issues	Limited series	June – November 2010	Jai Nitz	Dynamite Entertainment	Prequel to the 2011 film.	Paperback: 1-60690-148-6/978-1-60690-148-9)
The Green Hornet (2011)	The Green Hornet: Aftermath	4 issues	Limited series	April – July 2011	Jai Nitz	Dynamite Entertainment	Sequel to the 2011 film.	No
Green Lantern	Green Lantern Movie Prequel: Sinestro	1 issue	One-shot	July 2011	Geoff Johns, Michael Goldenberg, Adam Schlagman	DC Comics	Part one of a five-issue cycle.	Green Lantern: The Movie Prequels TP (0-85768-826-X/978-0-85768-826-2)
Green Lantern	Green Lantern Movie Prequel: Kilowog	1 issue	One-shot	July 2011	Peter J. Tomasi	DC Comics	Part two of a five-issue cycle.	Green Lantern: The Movie Prequels TP (0-85768-826-X/978-0-85768-826-2)
Green Lantern	Green Lantern Movie Prequel: Abin Sur	1 issue	One-shot	July 2011	Michael Green	DC Comics	Part three of a five-issue cycle.	Green Lantern: The Movie Prequels TP (0-85768-826-X/978-0-85768-826-2)
Green Lantern	Green Lantern Movie Prequel: Tomar-Re	1 issue	One-shot	July 2011	Marc Guggenheim	DC Comics	Part four of a five-issue cycle.	Green Lantern: The Movie Prequels TP (0-85768-826-X/978-0-85768-826-2)
Green Lantern	Green Lantern Movie Prequel: Hal Jordan	1 issue	One-shot	July 2011	Geoff Johns, Greg Berlanti, Donald De Line, Adam Schlagman	DC Comics	Part five of a five-issue cycle.	Green Lantern: The Movie Prequels TP (0-85768-826-X/978-0-85768-826-2)
Gun Glory	Four Color (series 2) #846	1 issue	One-shot	October 1957	?	Dell Comics	Adaptation of the eponymous film.	No
Gunga Din	Movie Comics #1	1 issue	Photo comics, main feature	April 1939	?	DC Comics	Condensed adaptation of the eponymous film.	No
Gus	Walt Disney's Treasury of Classic Tales: Gus	13 installments	Newspaper strip	March 7 – May 30, 1976	Carl Fallberg	King Features Syndicate	Adaptation of the eponymous film; the artwork was done by Mike Arens.	No
Gypsy Colt	Four Color (series 2) #568	1 issue	One-shot	June 1954	?	Dell Comics	Adaptation of the eponymous film.	No

== H ==
Based on	Title	Length	Format	Publication date	Authors	Publisher	Notes	Collected editions
The Hallelujah Trail	Dell Movie Classics #12-307-602	1 issue	One-shot	February 1966	Paul S. Newman	Dell Comics	Adaptation of the eponymous film; 32 pages total.	No
Halloween	Halloween	1 issue	One-shot	November 2000	Phil Nutman	Chaos! Comics		No
Halloween	Halloween II: The Blackest Eyes	1 issue	One-shot	April 2001	Phil Nutman	Chaos! Comics		No
Halloween	Halloween III: The Devil's Eyes	1 issue	One-shot	November 2001	Phil Nutman	Chaos! Comics		No
Halloween	Halloween: One Good Scare	1 issue		2003	Stefan Hutchinson			No
Halloween	Halloween: Autopsis	1 issue	Minicomic	2006	Stefan Hutchinson	Paranormal Pictures		No
Halloween	Halloween: Nightdance	4 issues	Limited series	February – May 2008	Stefan Hutchinson	Devil's Due Publishing		Paperback: 1-934692-20-4/978-1-934692-20-2
Halloween	Halloween: 30 Years of Terror	1 issue	One-shot	August 2008	Stefan Hutchinson	Devil's Due Publishing		No
Halloween	Halloween: The First Death of Laurie Strode	2 issues	Limited series	September – November 2008	Stefan Hutchinson	Devil's Due Publishing		No
Hansel and Gretel: An Opera Fantasy	Four Color (series 2) #590	1 issue	One-shot	October 1954	?	Dell Comics	Adaptation of the eponymous 1954 film.	No
The Happiest Days of Your Life	Knockout #???–???: "The Happiest Days of Your Life"	7 issues	Main feature, serial	25 March 1950 – 6 May 1950	?	Amalgamated Press	Adaptation of the eponymous film.	
The Happiest Millionaire	Walt Disney's Treasury of Classic Tales: The Happiest Millionaire	13 installments	Newspaper strip	August 6 – October 29, 1967	Frank Reilly	King Features Syndicate	Adaptations of the eponymous film; the art for the book version, running for a total of 26 pages, was drawn and inked by Dan Spiegle, while the art for the strip version was done by John Ushler.	No
The Happiest Millionaire	Walt Disney Presents – The Happiest Millionaire	1 issue	One-shot	April 1968	?	Gold Key Comics	Adaptations of the eponymous film; the art for the book version, running for a total of 26 pages, was drawn and inked by Dan Spiegle, while the art for the strip version was done by John Ushler.	No
Hatari!	Dell Movie Classics #12-340-301	1 issue	One-shot	January 1963	?	Dell Comics	Adaptation of the eponymous film.	No
Heavy Metal	Taarna	4 issues	Limited series	2018 – 2019	Alex De Campi	Heavy Metal Entertainment, LLC	Continuations based on the ninth and final segment of the eponymous 1981 film, itself based on the magazine of the same name.	Paperback: 978-1-947784-08-6
Heavy Metal	Heavy Metal Elements: Taarna – The Cosmic Gardener	1 issue	One-shot	September 2021	Dave Erwin, Matt Medney	Heavy Metal Entertainment, LLC	Continuations based on the ninth and final segment of the eponymous 1981 film, itself based on the magazine of the same name.	
Heavy Metal	Taarna: The Last Taarakian	6 issues	Limited series	January – June 2021	Stephanie Phillips	Heavy Metal Entertainment, LLC	Continuations based on the ninth and final segment of the eponymous 1981 film, itself based on the magazine of the same name.	No
Helen of Troy	Four Color (series 2) #684	1 issue	One-shot	March 1956	Paul S. Newman	Dell Comics	Adaptation of the eponymous film.	No
Hellraiser	Clive Barker's Hellraiser	20 issues	Ongoing series	1989 – 1992		Marvel Comics/Epic Comics		
Hellraiser	Hellraiser III: Hell on Earth	1 issue	One-shot	1992	Peter Atkins	Marvel Comics/Epic Comics	Adaptation of the third film.	
Herbie	Walt Disney's Treasury of Classic Tales: The Love Bug	13 installments	Newspaper strip	Mar 2 – May 25, 1969	Frank Reilly	King Features Syndicate	Adaptations of the first film; the art for the strip version was done by John Ushler and the art for the book version, running for twenty-five pages total, drawn by Dan Spiegle.	No
Herbie	Walt Disney Productions Presents – The Love Bug	1 issue	One-shot	June 1969	?	Gold Key Comics	Adaptations of the first film; the art for the strip version was done by John Ushler and the art for the book version, running for twenty-five pages total, drawn by Dan Spiegle.	No
Herbie	Walt Disney's Treasury of Classic Tales: Herbie Rides Again	13 installments	Newspaper strip	May 5 – July 28, 1974	Frank Reilly	King Features Syndicate	Adaptations of the second film; the art for the strip version was done by Mike Arens, while the art for the book version, running for twenty-five pages total, was drawn by Dan Spiegle.	No
Herbie	Walt Disney Showcase #24: "Herbie Rides Again"	1 issue	One-shot	August 1974	Mary Virginia Carey	Gold Key Comics	Adaptations of the second film; the art for the strip version was done by Mike Arens, while the art for the book version, running for twenty-five pages total, was drawn by Dan Spiegle.	No
Herbie	Walt Disney's Treasury of Classic Tales: Herbie Goes to Monte Carlo	13 installments	Newspaper strip	June 5 – August 28, 1977	Al Stoffel	King Features Syndicate	Adaptations of the third film; the art for the strip version was done by Richard Moore, while the art for the book version, running for twenty-five pages total, was drawn by Dan Spiegle.	No
Herbie	Walt Disney Showcase #41: "Herbie Goes to Monte Carlo"	1 issue	One-shot	October 1977	Mary Virginia Carey	Gold Key Comics	Adaptations of the third film; the art for the strip version was done by Richard Moore, while the art for the book version, running for twenty-five pages total, was drawn by Dan Spiegle.	No
Herbie	Disney Adventures Comic Zone: "Herbie: Fully Loaded"	1 issue	Back-up feature	Summer 2005	Art Baltazar	Disney Publishing Worldwide	Episode based on the sixth film; four pages total.	No
Hercules (1958 film series)	Four Color (series 2) #1006: "Hercules" (1958)	1 issue	One-shot	July 1959	Paul S. Newman	Dell Comics	Adaptation of the eponymous 1958 film.	No
Hercules (1958 film series)	Four Color (series 2) #1121: "Hercules Unchained"	1 issue	One-shot	August 1960	Paul S. Newman	Dell Comics	Adaptation of the 1959 sequel film.	No
Hercules (1997)	Disney's Hercules: Official Comics Movie Adaptation	1 volume	Graphic novel	July 1997	Evan Skolnick	Acclaim Comics	Adaptation of the 1997 Disney film.	No
Hey There, It's Yogi Bear!	Hey There, It's Yogi Bear!	1 issue	One-shot	September 1964	Carl Fallberg	Gold Key Comics	Adaptation of the eponymous film.	No
Highlander (comics)	Highlander	13 issues	Ongoing series	July 2006 – November 2007	Brandon Jerwa, Michael Avon Oeming	Dynamite Entertainment		Vol. 1: The Coldest War (1-933305-32-0/978-1-933305-32-5); Vol. 2: Dark Quickening (1-933305-59-2/978-1-933305-59-2); Vol. 3: Armageddon (1-933305-67-3/978-1-933305-67-7)
Highlander (comics)	Highlander: Way of the Sword	4 issues	Limited series	December 2007 – April 2008	J.T. Krul, Carlos Rafael	Dynamite Entertainment		Paperback: 1-933305-87-8/978-1-933305-87-5
Highlander (comics)	Highlander Origins: Kurgan	2 issues	Limited series	January – February 2009	Brandon Jerwa, Carlos Rafael	Dynamite Entertainment		
Highlander (comics)	Highlander 3030	1 issue		July 2015		Emerald Star Comics		
Highlander (comics)	Highlander: The American Dream	5 issues	Limited series	February – June 2017	Brian Ruckley	IDW Publishing		Paperback: 1-68405-011-1/978-1-68405-011-6
The Hills Have Eyes	The Hills Have Eyes: The Beginning	1 volume	Graphic novel	June 2007	Jimmy Palmiotti, Justin Gray	Fox Atomic Comics	Prequel to the 2006 film.	No
Home (2015)	Home	4 issues	Limited series	August – November 2015	Max Davison	Titan Comics		Vol. 1: Hide & Seek & Oh (1-78276-228-0/978-1-78276-228-7); Vol. 2: Another Home (1-78276-229-9/978-1-78276-229-4)
Hong Kong	Movie Love #13	1 issue	Main feature	February 1952	?	Eastern Color Printing	Adaptation of the eponymous film; fourteen pages total.	No
The Horse in the Gray Flannel Suit	Walt Disney's Treasury of Classic Tales: The Horse in the Gray Flannel Suit	13 installments	Newspaper strip	October 6 – December 29, 1968	Frank Reilly	King Features Syndicate	Adaptation of the eponymous film; artwork by John Ushler.	No
Hook	Hook	4 issues	Limited series	February – March 1992	Charles Vess	Marvel Comics	Adaptation of the eponymous film.	Hook: The Official Movie Adaptation TP (0-87135-800-X/978-0-87135-800-4)
The Horizontal Lieutenant	Dell Movie Classics #01-348-210	1 issue	One-shot	October 1962	?	Dell Comics	Adaptation of the eponymous film; 32 pages total.	No
The Horse Soldiers	Four Color (series 2) #1048	1 issue	One-shot	September–November 1959	Gaylord DuBois	Dell Comics	Adaptation of the eponymous film.	No
Hot Lead and Cold Feet	Walt Disney's Treasury of Classic Tales: Hot Lead and Cold Feet	13 installments	Newspaper strip	June 4 – August 27, 1978	Al Stoffel	King Features Syndicate	Adaptation of the eponymous film; artwork by Richard Moore.	No
Hotel Transylvania	Hotel Transylvania: Kakieland Katasrophe	1 volume	Graphic novel	January 2018	Stefan Petrucha	Papercutz		Paperback: 1-62991-808-3/978-1-62991-808-2
Hotel Transylvania	Hotel Transylvania: Motel Transylvania	1 volume	Graphic novel	August 2018	Stefan Petrucha	Papercutz		Paperback: 1-5458-0014-6/978-1-5458-0014-0
House	House II: The Second Story	1 issue	One-shot	October 1987	Ralph Macchio	Marvel Comics	Adaptation of the second film.	No
The House of Fear (1939)	Movie Comics #5, "The House of Fear"	1 issue	Photo comics, main feature	August 1939	?	DC Comics	Condensed adaptation of the eponymous 1939 film.	No
How the West Was Won	How the West Was Won	1 issue	One-shot	July 1963	Paul S. Newman	Gold Key Comics	Adaptation of the eponymous film.	No
Howard the Duck	Howard the Duck	3 issues	Limited series	December 1986 – April 1987	Danny Fingeroth	Marvel Comics	Adaptation of the eponymous film, first published as Marvel Comics Super Special #41 in November 1986.	
The Howling	The Howling: Revenge of the Werewolf Queen	4 issues	Limited series	July – October 2017	Micky Neilson	Space Goat Productions	Alternative direct sequel to the original film, ignoring the film sequels.	Paperback: 978-1-64017-110-7
Hulk	Hulk: The Official Movie Adaptation	1 issue	One-shot	August 2003	Bruce Jones	Marvel Comics	Adaptation of the eponymous 2003 film.	No
Humanoids from the Deep	The Humanoids	1 issue	One-shot	October 2010	Benjamin Hall	Bluewater Comics		No
The Hunchback of Notre Dame (1956)	Four Color (series 2) #854	1 issue	One-shot	July 1957	Hal Kanter	Dell Comics	Adaptation of the 1956 film version based on the eponymous 1831 novel by Victor Hugo; 32 pages total.	No
The Hunchback of Notre Dame (1996)	Disney's The Hunchback of Notre Dame	2 issues	Limited series	July 1996	T. Jeanette Steiner	Marvel Comics	Adaptation of the 1996 Disney film; also published in complete form as Disney Comic Hits! #10, later the same month.	

== I ==
Based on	Title	Length	Format	Publication date	Authors	Publisher	Notes	Collected editions
I Aim at the Stars	Four Color (series 2) #1148	1 issue	One-shot	November 1960-January 1961	Leo Dorfman	Dell Comics	Adaptation of the eponymous film.	No
I Am Legend	I Am Legend: Awakening	1 issue	One-shot	2007	Steve Niles, Dawn Thomas, Mark Protosevich, Richard Matheson (credited as Richard Christian Matheson)	Vertigo Comics	Prequel to the 2007 film based on the eponymous 1954 novel by Richard Matheson.	No
I Love Melvin	Movie Love #20	1 issue	One-shot	April 1953	?	Eastern Color Printing	Adaptation of the eponymous film.	No
Ice Age	Ice Age: Iced In	5 volumes	Graphic novels	December 2011	Caleb Monroe	Kaboom!		
Ice Age	Ice Age: Playing Favorites	5 volumes	Graphic novels	March 2012	Caleb Monroe	Kaboom!		
Ice Age	Ice Age: Where There's Thunder	5 volumes	Graphic novels	May 2012	Caleb Monroe	Kaboom!		
Ice Age	Ice Age: Past, Presents and Future!	5 volumes	Graphic novels	October 2012	Caleb Monroe	Kaboom!		
Ice Age	Ice Age: The Hidden Treasure	5 volumes	Graphic novels	March 2013	Caleb Monroe	Kaboom!		
Igor	Igor: Movie Prequel	4 issues	Limited series	May – August 2008	Dara Naraghi	IDW Publishing	Prequel to the eponymous film.	
Igor	Igor: Movie Adaptation	4 issues	Limited series	August – September 2008	Barbara Randall Kesek	IDW Publishing	Adaptation of the eponymous film.	
Ilya Muromets	Four Color (series 2) #1118: "The Sword and the Dragon"	1 issue	One-shot	June–August 1960	Leo Dorfman	Dell Comics	Adaptation of the eponymous 1956 film, under the alternative American title.	No
In Old Monterey	Movie Comics #6: "In Old Monterey"	1 issue	Photo comics	?	October 1939	DC Comics	Condensed adaptation of the eponymous film.	No
In Search of the Castaways	In Search of the Castaways	1 issue	One-shot	?	March 1963	Gold Key Comics	Adaptation of the film version based on the eponymous 1867–68 novel by Jules Verne.	No
Inception	Inception: The Cobol Job	1 issue	Webcomic	Jordan Goldberg	December 2010	Warner Bros. Entertainment	Prequel to the film.	No
The Incredible Mr. Limpet	Dell Movie Classics #12-370-408	1 issue	One-shot	?	August 1964	Dell Comics	Adaptation of the eponymous film.	No
The Incredibles	The Incredibles (2004)	4 issues	Limited series	November 2004 – February 2005	Brad Bird	Dark Horse Comics	Adaptation of the original film.	
The Incredibles	Disney Adventures (volume 14) #14: "Every Day It'll Be the Same Old Story!"	1 issue		November 2004	Antonio Secondo	Disney Publishing Worldwide	Eight pages total.	No
The Incredibles	Disney Adventures (volume 15) #3: "Trick or Treat!"	1 issue			April 2005	Disney Publishing Worldwide	Four pages total.	No
The Incredibles	Disney Adventures Comic Zone #3: "Holiday Heroes!"	1 issue	Minicomic		Spring 2005	Disney Publishing Worldwide	Six pages total.	No
The Incredibles	Disney Adventures (volume 15) #5: "Diamond Disaster!"	1 issue			June/July 2005	Disney Publishing Worldwide	Three pages total.	No
The Incredibles	Disney Adventures Comic Zone #6: "Lethal Fashion!"	1 issue	Minicomic	Antonio Secondo	Winter 2005	Disney Publishing Worldwide	Eight pages total.	No
The Incredibles	Disney Adventures Comic Zone #10: "Dash vs. the Volcano!"	1 issue	Minicomic	Giovanni Rigano	Winter 2006	Disney Publishing Worldwide	Published in two parts; Part one is eight pages while part two is six pages bringing the total length of the story to 14 pages.	No
The Incredibles	Disney Adventures (volume 16) #2: "The Molecule Mash!"	1 issue	Minicomic	Antonella Dalena, Michael Stewart	March 2006	Disney Publishing Worldwide	Six pages total.	No
The Incredibles	The Incredibles (2009)	4 issues	Limited series	Mark Waid	May – June 2009	Boom! Studios	The main arc for this series is titled "Family Matters".	
The Incredibles	The Incredibles (2009)	17 issues and a 0th issue (18 issues total)	Ongoing series	Mark Waid, Landry Walker	July 2009 – October 2010	Boom! Studios	The series is presented through four arcs: "City of Incredibles" (#0-3), Revenge from Below (#4-7), "Secrets and Lies" (#8-11) and "Truth and Consequences" (#12-15).	
The Incredibles	Incredibles 2: Crisis in Mid-Life! & Other Stories	3 issues	Limited series	July – September 2018	Christos Gage, Landry Q. Walker	Dark Horse Comics	All four comics based on the second film; the latter is a part of a Free Comic Book Day exclusive alternating with the Dark Horse Minecraft comic.	
The Incredibles	Incredibles 2: Secret Identities	3 issues	Limited series	April – June 2019	Christos Gage	Dark Horse Comics	All four comics based on the second film; the latter is a part of a Free Comic Book Day exclusive alternating with the Dark Horse Minecraft comic.	
The Incredibles	Incredibles 2: Slow Burn	3 issues	February – April 2020	Limited series	Christos Gage	Dark Horse Comics	All four comics based on the second film; the latter is a part of a Free Comic Book Day exclusive alternating with the Dark Horse Minecraft comic.	
The Incredibles	FCDB 2019: Minecraft/Incredibles 2: "Date Night"	1 issue	One-shot	May 2019	Cavan Scott, Hope Larson	Dark Horse Comics	All four comics based on the second film; the latter is a part of a Free Comic Book Day exclusive alternating with the Dark Horse Minecraft comic.	
Independence Day	Independence Day	2 issues	Limited series	June – August 1996	Phil Crain	Marvel Comics	Adaptation of the original film.	
Independence Day	Independence Day: Dark Fathom	5 issues	Limited series	March – June 2016	Victor Gischler	Titan Comics		
The Indian Fighter	Four Color (series 2) #687	1 issue	One-shot	March 1956	Otto Binder	Dell Comics	Adaptation of the eponymous film.	No
Indiana Jones	Raiders of the Lost Ark	3 issues	Limited series	September – November 1981	Walt Simonson	Marvel Comics	Adaptation of the first film, first published in its entirety in Marvel Comics Super Special #18 earlier in September 1981.	
Indiana Jones	The Further Adventures of Indiana Jones	34 issues	Ongoing series	January 1983 – March 1986	John Byrne, Denny O'Neil, David Michelinie, Archie Goodwin, Larry Lieber, James Owsley, Herb Trimpe, Linda Grant, Ron Fortier	Marvel Comics		
Indiana Jones	Indiana Jones and the Temple of Doom	3 issues	Limited series	David Michelinie	September – November 1984	Marvel Comics	Adaptation of the second film, first published in its entirety in Marvel Comics Super Special #30 in August 1984.	
Indiana Jones	Indiana Jones and the Last Crusade	4 issues	Limited series	David Michelinie	October – November 1989	Marvel Comics	Adaptation of the third film.	
Indiana Jones	Indiana Jones and the Fate of Atlantis	4 issues	Limited series	March – September 1991	William Messner-Loebs	Dark Horse Comics		
Indiana Jones	"The Shrine of the Sea Devil", Dark Horse Comics #3—6	4 issues	Serial	Gary Gianni	October 1992 – January 1993	Dark Horse Comics		
Indiana Jones	Indiana Jones: Thunder in the Orient	6 issues	Limited series	Dan Barry	September 1993 – April 1994	Dark Horse Comics		
Indiana Jones	Indiana Jones and the Arms of Gold	4 issues	Limited series	Lee Marrs	February – May 1994	Dark Horse Comics		
Indiana Jones	Indiana Jones and the Golden Fleece	2 issues	Limited series	Pat McGreal, Dave Rawson	June – July 1994	Dark Horse Comics		
Indiana Jones	Indiana Jones and the Iron Phoenix	4 issues	Limited series	Lee Marrs	December 1994 – March 1995	Dark Horse Comics		
Indiana Jones	Indiana Jones and the Spear of Destiny	4 issues	Limited series	Elaine Lee	April – July 1995	Dark Horse Comics		
Indiana Jones	Indiana Jones and the Sargasso Pirates	4 issues	Limited series	Karl Kesel	December 1995 – March 1996	Dark Horse Comics		
Indiana Jones	Indiana Jones and the Kingdom of the Crystal Skull	2 issues	Limited series	John Jackson Miller	May 2008	Dark Horse Comics	Adaptation of the fourth film.	
Indiana Jones	Indiana Jones and the Tomb of the Gods	4 issues	Limited series	Rob Williams	June 2008 – March 2009	Dark Horse Comics		
Un indien dans la ville	Mimi Sikù: Un indien dans la ville	1 volume	Bande dessinée	April 30, 1995	Hervé Palud, Judith Rucar	Glénat	Adaptation of the eponymous film.	
Interstellar	Absolute Zero	1 issue	Digital comic	November 2014	Christopher Nolan	Condé Nast Publications	Prequel to the film, first published as an exclusive on the Wired magazine official website.	No
The Iron Giant	The Iron Giant	1 issue	Photo comics	1999	?	DC Comics	Giveaway comic adapting and editing stills from the eponymous film; six pages total.	No
Iron Sky	Iron Sky: Bad Moon Rising	1 issue	Digital comic	October 5, 2011	Mikko Rautalahti	Blind Spot Pictures	Prequel comic to the film.	
The Island at the Top of the World	Walt Disney Showcase #27	1 issue	One-shot	February 1975	Mary Virginia Carey	Gold Key Comics	Adaptation of the eponymous film.	No
The Island of Dr. Moreau (1977)	The Island of Dr. Moreau	1 issue	One-shot	October 1977	Doug Moench	Marvel Comics	Adaptation of the 1977 film version based on the eponymous 1896 novel by H. G. Wells.	No
It! The Terror from Beyond Space	It! The Terror from Beyond Space (1992–1993)	3 issues	Limited series	November 1992 – February 1993	Mark Ellis	Millennium Publications	Adaptations of the eponymous film; the latter 2010 comic was published by IDW under the short-lived "Midnite Movies" imprint.	No
It! The Terror from Beyond Space	It! The Terror from Beyond Space (2010)	#1—3	Limited series	June – September 2010	Dara Naraghi	IDW Publishing	Adaptations of the eponymous film; the latter 2010 comic was published by IDW under the short-lived "Midnite Movies" imprint.	
It Came from Beneath the Sea	It Came from Beneath the Sea... Again!	4 issues	Limited series	2012	Clay Griffith	TidalWave Productions		Paperback: 978-1-4507-2376-3
Invaders from Mars (1953)	Invaders from Mars!	3 issues	Limited series	February – April 1990		Eternity Comics	Adaptation of the 1953 film.	No
Invaders from Mars (1953)	Invaders from Mars Book II	3 issues	Limited series		June – August 1991	Eternity Comics	Sequel to the 1953 film adaptation.	No
Ivanhoe (1952)	Fawcett Movie Comic #20	1 issue	One-shot	December 1952	Leo Dorfman	Fawcett Comics	Adaptation of the 1952 film version based on the eponymous 1819 novel by Walter Scott.	No

== J ==
Based on	Title	Length	Format	Publication date	Authors	Publisher	Notes	Collected editions
Jack the Giant-Killer	Dell Movie Classics #12-374-301	1 issue	One-shot	January 1963	Ken Fitch	Dell Comics	Adaptation of the eponymous film.	No
James Bond	Classics Illustrated #158A: "Dr. No"	1 issue	One-shot	December 1962	Alfred Sundel	Thorpe & Porter	Adaptation of the first film; reprinted in the United States by DC Comics as Showcase #43 (March–April 1963).	No
James Bond	For Your Eyes Only	2 issues	Limited series	October – November 1981	Larry Hama	Marvel Comics	Adaptation of the twelfth film; first published as Marvel Comics Super Special #19 (October 1981).	
James Bond	Marvel Comics Super Special #26: "Octopussy"	1 issue	Magazine, one-shot	September 1983	Steve Moore	Marvel Comics	Adaptation of the thirteenth film.	No
James Bond	Licence to Kill	1 issue	Graphic novel	November 1989	Mike Grell	Acme Press, Eclipse Comics	Adaptation of the sixteenth film.	
James Bond	GoldenEye #00, #1	2 issues	Limited series	January 1996	Don McGregor	Topps Comics	Adaptation of the seventeenth film; planned three-issue limited series cancelled after the first issue.	No
Jason and the Argonauts	Dell Movie Classics #12-376-310	1 issue	One-shot	August–October 1963	Paul S. Newman	Dell Comics	Adaptation of the eponymous film.	No
Jason and the Argonauts	Jason and the Argonauts: The Kingdom of Hades	5 issues	Limited series	November 2007 – March 2008	David McIntee	TidalWave Productions		Paperback: 1-61623-945-X/978-1-61623-945-9
Jason and the Argonauts	Jason and the Argonauts: Final Chorus	4 issues	Limited series	March 2014 – June 2015	David McIntee, Michael Dorman, Leon McKenzie	TidalWave Productions		Paperback: 1-948724-72-3/978-1-948724-72-2
Jaws	Jaws (ジョーズ)	1 issue	Magazine	December 1975	Tanabe Setsuo	Akita Shoten	Gekiga adaptation of the eponymous 1975 film (50 pages); Published in Monthly Shōnen Champion.	No
Jaws	Gekiga Jaws (劇画ジョーズ)	1 issue	One-shot	December 1975	Tadashi Sakuma	Herald Books	Gekiga adaptation of the eponymous 1975 film (100 pages).	No
Jaws	Marvel Comics Super Special #6: "Jaws 2"	1 issue	Magazine, one-shot	December 1978	Richard Marschall	Marvel Comics	Adaptation of the second film.	No
Jeepers Creepers	Jeepers Creepers	5 issues	Limited series	April – September 2018	Marc Andrekyo	Dynamite Entertainment		Vol. 1: Trail of the Beast TP (1-5241-0792-1/978-1-5241-0792-5)
John Carter	John Carter: World of Mars	4 issues	Limited series	December 2011 – March 2012	Peter David	Marvel Comics	Prequel to the eponymous film.	Paperback: 0-7851-6041-8/978-0-7851-6041-0
John Paul Jones	Four Color (series 2) #1007	1 issue	One-shot	August–October 1959	Eric Freiwald, Robert Schaefer	Dell Comics	Adaptation of the eponymous film.	No
John Wick	John Wick	5 issues	Ongoing series	Greg Pak	November 2017 – February 2019	Dynamite Entertainment		Hardcover (1-5241-0682-8/978-1-5241-0682-9); Trade paperback (1-5241-1514-2/978-1-5241-1514-2)
Johnny Tremain	Four Color (series 2) #822: "Paul Revere's Ride with Johnny Tremain"	1 issue	One-shot	August 1957	Del Connell	Dell Comics		No
Johnny Tremain	Four Color (series 2) #874: "Old Ironsides with Johnny Tremain"	1 issue	One-shot	January 1958	?	Dell Comics		No
Journey to the Center of the Earth	Four Color (series 2) #1060	1 issue	One-shot	December 1959-February 1960	Robert Schaefer	Dell Comics	Adaptation of the 1959 film version based on the eponymous 1864 novel by Jules Verne.	No
Judge Dredd	Judge Dredd: The Official Movie Adaptation	1 issue	One-shot	September 1995	Andrew Helfer	DC Comics	Adaptation of the 1995 film based on the comic by John Wagner and Carlos Ezquerra.	Paperback: 1-56389-245-6/978-1-56389-245-5
The Jungle Book	The Jungle Book	1 issue	One-shot	January 1968	Carl Fallberg	Whitman Publishing	Adaptation of the eponymous 1967 film; republished by Gold Key two months later.	No
The Jungle Book	Baloo and Little Britches (Mowgli)	1 issue	One-shot	April 1968	?	Gold Key Comics	The comic features two main stories, "The Jungle Trap" (16 pages) and "Guardians Angel" (10 pages), an untitled minicomic story and five filler pages of activities ("Keys of Knowledge – The Kinkajou", "Scale", the two-page spread "Riddles & Jokes" and "Styracosaurus").	No
The Jungle Book	King Louie and Mowgli (Little Britches)	1 issue	One-shot	May 1968	?	Gold Key Comics	The comic features two main stories, "A Clown is Crowned" (18 pages) and "The Big Bad Bear" (8 pages), a one-page minicomic story and a "Keys of Knowledge" filler page, "The Long-Tailed Weasel".	No
Jurassic Park (comics)	Jurassic Park (1993)	4 issues	Limited series	June – August 1993	Walt Simonson	Topps Comics	Adaptation of the first film.	Jurassic Park TP (18833130203); The Lost World: Jurassic Park TP (1-85286-885-6/978-1-85286-885-7); Jurassic Park Volume 1: Danger (1-61479-183-X/978-1-61479-183-6); Jurassic Park Volume 2: The Miracle of Cloning (1-61479-184-8/978-1-61479-184-3); Jurassic Park Volume 8: Animals vs. Men (1-61479-190-2/978-1-61479-190-4); Classic Jurassic Park Volume 1 (1-60010-760-5/978-1-60010-760-3); Classic Jurassic Park Volume 2: Raptors Revenge (1-60010-885-7/978-1-60010-885-3); Classic Jurassic Park Volume 3: Amazon Adventure (1-61377-042-1/978-1-61377-042-9); Classic Jurassic Park Volume 4: Return to Jurassic Park – Part One (1-61377-117-7/978-1-61377-117-4); Classic Jurassic Park Volume 5: Return to Jurassic Park – Part Two (1-61377-533-4/978-1-61377-533-2); Classic Jurassic Park Volume 6: The Lost World (1-61377-915-1/978-1-61377-915-6)
Jurassic Park (comics)	Jurassic Park: Raptor	2 issues	Limited series	November – December 1993	Steve Englehart	Topps Comics		
Jurassic Park (comics)	Jurassic Park: Raptors Attack	4 issues	Limited series	March – June 1994	Steve Englehart	Topps Comics		
Jurassic Park (comics)	Jurassic Park Adventures	10 issues	Ongoing series	June 1994 – February 1995	Steve Englehart	Topps Comics	Reprint series conflating the Raptor, Raptors Attack and Raptors Hijack limited series into one ongoing narrative.	
Jurassic Park (comics)	Jurassic Park: Raptors Hijack	4 issues	Limited series	July – October 1994	Steve Englehart	Topps Comics		
Jurassic Park (comics)	Jurassic Park Annual #1	1 issue	One-shot	May 1995	Neil Barrett Jr., Renee Witterstaetter, Michael Golden	Topps Comics	Annual publication.	
Jurassic Park (comics)	Return to Jurassic Park	9 issues	Limited series	April 1995 – February 1996	Steve Englehart	Topps Comics		
Jurassic Park (comics)	The Lost World: Jurassic Park	4 issues	Limited series	May – August 1997	Don McGregor	Topps Comics	Adaptation of the second film.	
Jurassic Park (comics)	Jurassic Park (2010)	5 issues	Limited series	June – October 2010	Bob Schreck	IDW Publishing		Paperback: 1-60010-850-4/978-1-60010-850-1
Jurassic Park (comics)	Jurassic Park: The Devils in the Desert	5 issues	Limited series	January – April 2011	John Bryne	IDW Publishing		Paperback: 1-60010-923-3/978-1-60010-923-2
Jurassic Park (comics)	Jurassic Park: Dangerous Games	5 issues	Limited series	September 2011 – January 2012	Greg Bear, Erik Bear	IDW Publishing		Hardcover (1-61377-002-2/978-1-61377-002-3); Trade paperback (1-61377-002-2/978-1-61377-002-3)
Just This Once	Movie Love #14	1 issue	Comic story	April 1952	?	Eastern Color Printing	Adaptation of the eponymous film.	No

== K ==
Based on	Title	Length	Format	Publication date	Authors	Publisher	Notes	Collected editions
Kidnapped (1960)	Four Color (series 2) #1101	1 issue	One-shot	May–July 1960	?	Dell Comics	Adaptation of the eponymous film.	No
King Kong (comics)	Aventuras del FBI #57: "El hijo de King-Kong"	1 issue	Comic story	July 1953	Miguel González Casquel	Editorial Rollán, S. A.	Adaptation of the sequel film The Son of Kong (1933).	No
King Kong (comics)	King Kong (1968)	1 issue	One-shot	September 1968	Gary Poole	Gold Key Comics	Adaptation of the 1933 film.	No
King Kong (comics)	Kingu Kongu (1976) (キングコング)		Serialized manga	October – November 1976		Kodansha	Adaptation of the 1976 film; serialized in Monthly Shōnen Magazine.	No
King Kong (comics)	King Kong (1991)	6 issues	Limited series	February 1991 – March 1992	Don Simpson	Monster Comics	Adaptation of the 1933 film.	No
King Kong (comics)	King Kong: The 8th Wonder of the World	1 issue	One-shot	December 2006	Chris Gossett	Dark Horse Comics	Adaptation of the 2005 film.	
King of Kings (1961)	Four Color (series 2) #1236	1 issue	One-shot	December 1961-February 1962	?	Dell Comics	Adaptation of the eponymous film.	No
King of the Rocket Men	Rocketman: King of the Rocket Men	4 issues	Limited series	1991	Christopher Moeller	Innovation Publishing	Adaptation of the eponymous serial film.	Paperback: 1-56521-004-2/978-1-56521-004-2
King of the Turf	Movie Comics #2	1 issue	Photo comics, comic story	?	Fawcett Comics	May 1939	Condensed adaptation of the eponymous film.	No
King Richard and the Crusaders	Four Color (series 2) #588	1 issue	One-shot	October 1954	?	Dell Comics	Adaptation of the eponymous film.	No
Knights of the Round Table	Four Color (series 2) #540	1 issue	One-shot	March 1954	Paul S. Newman	Dell Comics	Adaptation of the eponymous film.	No
Konga	Konga #1	1 issue	One-shot	June 1961	Joe Gill	Charlton Comics	Adaptation of the eponymous film.	No
Krull	Krull	2 issues	Limited series	November – December 1983	David Michelinie	Marvel Comics	Adaptation of the eponymous film; first published in its complete form as Marvel Comics Super Special #28 (October 1983).	No
Kung Fu Panda	Kung Fu Panda (2011)	6 issues	Limited series	May 2011 – June 2012	Matt Anderson	Ape Entertainment		
Kung Fu Panda	Kung Fu Panda (2015)	4 issues	Limited series	October 2015 – January 2016	Simon Furman	Titan Comics		

== L ==
Based on	Title	Length	Format	Publication date	Authors	Publisher	Notes	Collected editions
Lad, A Dog	Four Color (series 2) #1303	1	One-shot	February–April 1962	Ken Fitch	Dell Comics	Adaptation of the eponymous film, itself based on the 1919 novel of the same title by Albert Payson Terhune.	No
Labyrinth (1986)	Labyrinth	3 issues	Limited series	November 1986 – January 1987	Sid Jacobson	Marvel Comics	Adaptation of the original film; first published in its complete form as Marvel Comics Super Special #40 (October 1986).	
Labyrinth (1986)	Return to Labyrinth	4 issues	OEL manga	2006 – 2010	Jake T. Forbes	Tokyopop		
Labyrinth (1986)	Labyrinth 30th Anniversary Special	1 issue	One-shot	August 2016		Archaia Entertainment		
Labyrinth (1986)	Labyrinth 2017 Special	1 issue	One-shot	November 2017		Archaia Entertainment		
Labyrinth (1986)	Labyrinth: Coronation	12 issues	Limited series	February 2018 – March 2019	Simon Spurrier	Archaia Entertainment		
Labyrinth (1986)	Labyrinth: Under the Spell	1 issue	One-shot	November 2018		Archaia Entertainment		
Labyrinth (1986)	Labyrinth: Masquerade	1 issue	One-shot	December 2020	Lara Elena Donnelly	Archaia Entertainment		
Lady and the Tramp	Four Color (series 2) #629: "Lady and the Tramp with Jock"	1 issue	One-shot	May 1955		Dell Comics		No
Lady and the Tramp	Dell Giant: "Lady and the Tramp" #1	1 issue	One-shot	June 1955		Dell Comics		No
Lady and the Tramp	Four Color (series 2) #634: "Lady and the Tramp Album"	1 issue	One-shot	1955		Dell Comics		No
Lady and the Tramp	Lady and the Tramp in "Butter Late Than Never"	1 issue	Minicomic	1955		Western Publishing	American Dairy Association premium.	No
Lady and the Tramp	Scamp		Ongoing series	May 1956 – January 1979		Dell Comics, Gold Key Comics		No
Lancelot and Guinevere	Dell Movie Classics #416	1 issue	One-shot	October 1963		Dell Comics	Adaptation of the eponymous film.	No
The Land Before Time	The Land Before Time: The 3-D Adventure	1 issue	One-shot	October 1996	Steve Utley	Kitchen Sink Press	Originally published in anaglyph 3-D.	No
The Land That Time Forgot (1974)	Marvel Movie Premiere #1	1 issue	Magazine	September 1975		Marvel Comics		No
The Land Unknown	Four Color (series 2) #845	1 issue	One-shot	August 1957		Dell Comics		
Lash LaRue	Fawcett Movie Comic #9: "King of the Bull Whip"	3 issues	Comic story	December 1950	Leo Dorfman	Fawcett Comics	Adaptation of the seventh film.	No
Lash LaRue	Fawcett Movie Comic #12: "The Thundering Trail"	3 issues	One-shot	June 1951	Leo Dorfman	Fawcett Comics	Adaptation of the eighth film.	No
Lash LaRue	Motion Picture Comics #111: "The Vanishing Outpost"	3 issues	One-shot	May 1951	Leo Dorfman	Fawcett Comics	Adaptation of the ninth film.	No
The Last Airbender	The Last Airbender Prequel: Zuko's Story	1 volume	Graphic novel	May 2010	Dave Roman, Alison Wilgus	Del Rey Manga		No
The Last Airbender	The Last Airbender	1 volume	Graphic novel	June 2010	Dave Roman, Alison Wilgus	Del Rey Manga		No
The Last Hunt	Four Color (series 2) #678	1 issue	One-shot	February 1956	Bob Jenney	Dell Comics	Adaptation of the eponymous film.	No
The Last of the Fast Guns	Four Color (series 2) #925	1 volume	One-shot	August 1958	?	Dell Comics	Adaptation of the eponymous film.	No
The Last Outpost	Fawcett Movie Comic #14	1 issue	One-shot	December 1951	Leo Dorfman	Fawcett Comics	Adaptation of the eponymous film.	No
The Last Starfighter	The Last Starfighter	3 issues	Limited series	October – December 1984	Bill Mantlo	Marvel Comics	Adaptation of the eponymous film; first published in complete form as Marvel Comics Super Special #31 in September 1984.	
Last Train from Gun Hill	Four Color (series 2) #1012	1 issue	One-shot	July 1959	Gaylord DuBois	Dell Comics	Adaptation of the eponymous film.	No
Lawrence of Arabia	Dell Movie Classics #12-426-308	1 issue	One-shot	August 1963	?	Dell Comics	Adaptation of the eponymous film.	No
The Left Handed Gun	Four Color (series 2) #913	1 issue	One-shot	July 1958	?	Dell Comics	Adaptation of the eponymous film.	No
The Legend of Lobo	Walt Disney's The Legend of Lobo	1 issue	One-shot	Eric Freiwald, Robert Schaefer	Gold Key Comics	March 1963	Adaptation of the eponymous film.	No
Legends of Oz: Dorothy's Return	Dorothy of Oz Prequel	4 issues	Limited series	March – September 2012	Denton J. Tipton	IDW Publishing	Prequel to the film under its original title, published a year before the film's release.	Paperback: 1-61377-217-3/978-1-61377-217-1
Leprechaun	Leprechaun	4 issues	Limited series	May – August 2009		TidalWave Productions		
Let's Dance	Movie Love #7	1 issue	One-shot	February 1951		Eastern Color Printing	Adaptation of the eponymous film.	
A Life Less Ordinary	2000 AD #1063—1070	8 issues	Comic story, serial	October – November 1997		Egmont UK	Adaptation of the eponymous film.	
The Light in the Forest	Four Color (series 2) #891	1 issue	One-shot	1958	?	Dell Comics	Adaptation of the eponymous film; itself based on the 1953 novel of the same title by Conrad Richter.	No
The Lion	The Lion	1 issue	One-shot	January 1963	?	Gold Key Comics	Adaptation of the eponymous film.	No
The Lion King	Disney's The Lion King	2 issues	Limited series	July – August 1994	Bobbi J.G. Weiss	Marvel Comics	Adaptation of the 1994 film.	
The Lion King	Disney Adventures (volume 9) #1: "Birds of a Feather"	1 issue	Comic story	November 1998		Disney Publishing Worldwide		
The Lion King	Les Classiques du dessin animé en bande dessinée Vol. 28: "Le Roi Lion II: L'Honneur de la tribu"	1 volume	Bande dessinée	February 1999	Daan Jippes	Dargaud	Adaptation of the direct-to-video sequel film.	
The Lion King	Disney Adventures (volume ?) #?: "Just Lion Around!"	1 issue	Comic story	April 2002		Disney Publishing Worldwide		
The Lion King	Disney The Lion King: Wild Schemes and Catastrophes	1 volume	Graphic novel	December 11, 2019	John Jackson Miller	Dark Horse Comics	Anthology of self-contained stories based on the 2019 film.	
The Lion King	Disney Villains: Scar	4 issues	Limited series	Chuck Brown	Dynamite Entertainment	April – July 2023	First installment of the Disney Villains comics line.	
The Little Mermaid	Disney's The Little Mermaid: The Official Movie Adaptation	1 volume	Graphic novel	1990	Tom Anderson	W. D. Publications, Inc.	First adaptation of the 1989 film; 46 pages total. Cover adapted from the poster art by John Alvin.	
The Little Mermaid	Disney's The Little Mermaid	4 issues	Limited series	February – June 1992	Peter David	Disney Comics		
The Little Mermaid	Disney's Sebastian	2 issues	Limited series	Peter David, Doug Murray, Pat McGreal, Dave Rawson, Scott Saavedra, David Cody Weiss, Bobbi JG Weiss, Doug Rice	May – June 1992	Disney Comics	Spin-off comic focusing on the eponymous side character.	
The Little Mermaid	Disney The Little Mermaid (2019)	3 issues	Limited series	October 2019 – February 2020	Cecil Castellucci	Dark Horse Comics	Second adaptation of the 1989 film.	Paperback: 978-1-5067-1572-8
Little Monsters	Little Monsters	6 issues	Limited series	January – June 1990	Katherine Llewellyn	NOW Comics		
The Little Shop of Horrors	Little Shop of Horrors	1 issue	One-shot	March 1987	Michael Fleisher	DC Comics	Adaptation of the 1986 film.	No
The Little Shop of Horrors	Welcome to the Little Shop of Horrors	3 issues	Limited series	May – July 1995		Roger Corman's Cosmic Comics	Adaptation of the 1960 film.	No
The Littlest Outlaw	Four Color (series 2) #609	1 issue	One-shot	December 1954	?	Dell Comics	Adaptation of the eponymous film.	No
Logan's Run	Logan's Run	7 issues	Ongoing series	January – July 1977	Gerry Conway, David Anthony Kraft, Ed Hannigan (script assistance), John Warner	Marvel Comics	Adaptation of the eponymous film, itself based on the 1967 novel of the same title, followed by a brief continuation through two more issues.	No
The Lone Ranger (1956)	Dell Giant #1: "The Lone Ranger Movie Story"	1 issue	One-shot	March 1956	?	Dell Comics	Adaptation of the eponymous film, plus reprints of text stories from issues #5 and #9 from the regular Dell Comics series.	No
Looney Tunes	Space Jam	1 issue	One-shot	1996	David Cody Weiss	DC Comics	Adaptation of the eponymous film.	No
Looney Tunes	Looney Tunes: Back in Action — The Official Comic Book Adaptation	1 issue	One-shot	December 2003	Bill Matheny	DC Comics	Adaptation of the eponymous film.	No
Looney Tunes	Space Jam: A New Legacy	1 issue	Graphic novel	June 2021	Ivan Cohen	DC Comics	Adaptation of the eponymous film.	No
Lord Jim (1965)	Lord Jim	1 issue	One-shot	September 1965	Gaylord DuBois	Gold Key Comics	Adaptation of the eponymous film.	No
The Lost Boys	Lost Boys: Reign of Frogs	4 issues	Limited series	May – August 2008	Hans Rodionoff	Wildstorm		
The Lost Boys	The Lost Boys	6 issues	Limited series	December 2016 – May 2017	Tim Seeley	Vertigo		
Lost in Space	Lost in Space	3 issues	Limited series	April – July 1998	Brian McDonald	Dark Horse Comics	Adaptation of the 1998 film based on the eponymous television series created by Irwin Allen.	
The Lost World (1960)	Four Color (series 2) #1145	1 issue	One-shot	September–November 1960	Paul S. Newman	Dell Comics	Adaptation of the 1960 film version based on the eponymous 1912 novel by Sir Arthur Conan Doyle.	No
Lt. Robin Crusoe, U.S.N.	Walt Disney – Lt. Robin Crusoe, U.S.N.	1 issue	One-shot	October 1966	?	Gold Key Comics	Adaptation of the eponymous film; 32 pages total.	
Luana	Vampirella #31	1 issue	Comic story	March 1974	Doug Moench	Warren Publishing	Adaptation of the eponymous film; twelve pages total.	No

== M ==
Based on	Title	Length	Format	Publication date	Authors	Publisher	Notes	Collected editions
M	M	4 issues	Limited series	1990	Jon J. Muth	Eclipse Comics	Adaptation of the eponymous film.	M – A Graphic Novel Based on the Film by Fritz Lang HC
Machete	Machete	1 issue	One-shot	September 2010	Robert Rodriguez, Aaron Kaufman	IDW Publishing		No
Mad Max (comics)	Mad Max: Fury Road – Nux & Immortan Joe	1 issue	One-shot	July 2015	George Miller, Nico Lathouris, Mark Sexton	Vertigo Comics	All comics are prequels to the fourth film.	Mad Max: Fury Road TPB
Mad Max (comics)	Mad Max: Fury Road – Furiosa	1 issue	One-shot	August 2015	George Miller, Nico Lathouris, Mark Sexton	Vertigo Comics	All comics are prequels to the fourth film.	Mad Max: Fury Road TPB
Mad Max (comics)	Mad Max: Fury Road – Max	2 issues	Limited series	September – October 2015	George Miller	Vertigo Comics	All comics are prequels to the fourth film.	Mad Max: Fury Road TPB
Mad Monster Party?	Dell Movie Classics #12-460-801	1 issue	One-shot	September 1967		Dell Comics	Adaptation of the eponymous film.	No
Madagascar	Madagascar 3: Long Live the King!	1 volume	Graphic novel	June 2012	David Server, Jackson Lanzing	Ape Entertainment	Based on the third film.	
Madagascar	Penguins of Madagascar	4 issues	Limited series	December 2014 – March 2015	Jai Nitz, Dan Abnett, Andy Lanning, Alex Matthews, Jim Alexander, Cavan Scott	Ape Entertainment	Based on the 2014 spin-off film.	
Madagascar	Madagascar	4 issues	Limited series	March – June 2016		Joe Books Ltd.		Madagascar: Escape Plans TPB
The Magic Sword (1962)	Dell Movie Classics #01-496-209	1 issue	One-shot	September 1962		Dell Comics	Adaptation of the eponymous film.	No
The Man from Planet X	Fawcett Movie Comic #15	1 issue	One-shot	February 1952	Otto Binder	Fawcett Comics	Adaptation of the eponymous film.	No
The Man in the Iron Mask (1939)	Movie Comics #5	1 issue	Photo comics, comic story	August 1939		DC Comics	Condensed adaptation of the 1939 film version based on the 1847-1850 novel The Vicomte of Bragelonne: Ten Years Later by Alexandre Dumas.	No
The Man Who Fell to Earth	The Man Who Fell to Earth	1 volume	Graphic novel	October 2022	Dan Watters	Titan Comics	Adaptation of the 1976 film based on the 1963 novel by Walter Tevis.	
Man with the Screaming Brain	Man with the Screaming Brain	4 issues	Limited series	April – July 2005	Bruce Campbell, David Goodman	Dark Horse Comics	Adaptation of Bruce Campbell's original screenplay of the eponymous film.	Man with the Screaming Brain TPB
Man-Thing	Man-Thing	3 issues	Limited series	September – November 2004	Hans Rodionoff	Marvel Comics	Prequel to the eponymous 2005 TV film.	Man-Thing: Whatever Knows Fear TPB
Marvel Cinematic Universe (comics)	Iron Man: I Am Iron Man!	2 issues	Limited series	March – April 2010	Peter David	Marvel Comics	Adaptation of Iron Man (2008).	
Marvel Cinematic Universe (comics)	Marvel's Iron Man 2	2 issues	Limited series	Christos N. Gage, Will Corona Pilgrim	January – February 2013	Marvel Comics	Adaptation of Iron Man 2 (2010).	
Marvel Cinematic Universe (comics)	Marvel's Thor	2 issues	Limited series	Christos N. Gage	March – April 2013	Marvel Comics	Adaptation of Thor (2011).	
Marvel Cinematic Universe (comics)	Marvel's Captain America: The First Avenger	2 issues	Limited series	Peter David	January – February 2014	Marvel Comics	Adaptation of Captain America: The First Avenger (2011).	
Marvel Cinematic Universe (comics)	Marvel's The Avengers	2 issues	Limited series	Will Corona Pilgrim	February – March 2015	Marvel Comics	Adaptation of The Avengers (2012).	
Marvel Cinematic Universe (comics)	Marvel's Captain America: Civil War Prelude	2 issues	Limited series	Will Corona Pilgrim	February – March 2016	Marvel Comics	Adaptation of Iron Man 3 (2013) and Captain America: The Winter Soldier (2014).	
Marvel Cinematic Universe (comics)	Marvel's Guardians of the Galaxy Vol. 2 Prelude	2 issues	Limited series	Will Corona Pilgrim	March – April 2017	Marvel Comics	Adaptation of Guardians of the Galaxy (2014).	
Marvel Cinematic Universe (comics)	Spider-Man: Homecoming Prelude	2 issues	Limited series	Will Corona Pilgrim	May – June 2017	Marvel Comics	Adaptation of Captain America: Civil War (2016).	
Marvel Cinematic Universe (comics)	Marvel's Thor: Ragnarok Prelude	2 issues	Limited series	Will Corona Pilgrim	September – October 2017	Marvel Comics	Adaptation of The Incredible Hulk (2008) and Thor: The Dark World (2013).	
Marvel Cinematic Universe (comics)	Marvel's Ant-Man and the Wasp Prelude	2 issues	Limited series	Will Corona Pilgrim	May – June 2018	Marvel Comics	Adaptation of Ant-Man (2015).	
Marvel Cinematic Universe (comics)	Marvel's Avengers: Endgame Prelude	2 issues	Limited series	Will Corona Pilgrim	February – April 2019	Marvel Comics	Adaptation of Avengers: Infinity War (2018).	
Marvel Cinematic Universe (comics)	Spider-Man: Far from Home Prelude	2 issues	Limited series	Will Corona Pilgrim, Peter David	May – June 2019	Marvel Comics	Adaptation of Spider-Man: Homecoming (2017).	
Mary Poppins	Walt Disney's Mary Poppins	1 issue	One-shot	January 1965	?	Gold Key Comics	Adaptation of the eponymous film; 32 pages total.	No
Mary Shelley's Frankenstein	Mary Shelley's Frankenstein: Official Comics Adaptation of the Kenneth Branagh Film	4 issues	Limited series	October 1994 – January 1995	Roy Thomas	Topps Comics	Adaptation of the 1994 film version based on the Mary Shelley novel.	
The Mask (1994)	The Mask: Official Movie Adaptation	2 issues	Limited series	July – August 1994	Mike Richardson	Dark Horse Comics	Adaptation of the first film based on the eponymous comic series created by Mike Richardson.	
Mask of the Avenger	Motion Picture Comics #108	1 issue	One-shot	January 1952	Leo Dorfman	Fawcett Comics	Adaptation of the eponymous film.	No
The Mask of Zorro	The Mask of Zorro	4 issues	Limited series	August – November 1998	Don McGregor	Image Comics	Adaptation of the eponymous film.	No
The Masque of the Red Death (1964)	Dell Movie Classics #12-490-410	1 issue	One-shot	August–October 1964	?	Dell Comics	Adaptation of the eponymous 1964 film, itself based on the 1842 short story by Edgar Allan Poe; 32 pages total.	No
Master of the World (1961)	Four Color (series 2) #1157	1 issue	One-shot	July 1961	Gaylord DuBois	Dell Comics	Adaptation of the eponymous film, plus two one-page fillers, a brief biography "Jules Verne, Author Extraordinary" and "They Ruled Their World, both written by DuBois.	No
Masters of the Universe (1987)	Masters of the Universe: The Motion Picture	1 issue	One-shot	November 1987	Ralph Macchio	Marvel Comics/Star Comics	Adaptation of the 1987 live action film based on the Mattel toyline of the same name.	No
The Mating Season	Movie Love #9	1 issue	One-shot	June 1951	?	Eastern Color Printing	Adaptation of the eponymous film; 25 pages total.	No
The Matrix	The Matrix: Comic Book Preview	1 issue	One-shot	March 1999		Warner Bros.	Promotional comic originally meant to tie-in with the release of the original film, but recalled due to object able content.	
The Matrix	The Matrix Comics	2 volumes	Graphic novels	July 2003, October 2003—December 2004	Larry and Andy Wachowski, Geof Darrow, Bill Sienkiewicz, Neil Gaiman, Ted McKeever, John Van Fleet, Dave Gibbons, David Lapham, Peter Bagge, Troy Nixey, Paul Chadwick, Ryder Windham, Kilian Plunkett, Gregory Ruth, Ted McKeever, Kaare Andrews, Geof Darrow, Steve Skroce	Burlyman Entertainment		
Maya	Dell Movie Classics #12-495-612	1 issue	One-shot	December 1966	Don Segall	Dell Comics	Adaptations of the eponymous film.	No
McHale's Navy (1964)	Dell Movie Classics #12-500-412	1 issue	One-shot	October–December 1964		Dell Comics	Adaptation of the spin-off feature film based on the eponymous TV series.	No
McLintock!	McLintock!	1 issue	One-shot	March 1964	Dick Wood	Gold Key Comics	Adaptation of the eponymous film, plus a one-page filler about the Locomotive 22, the train used in the film.	No
Meet the Robinsons	Disney Adventures (volume 17) #2, #3, #4, #5	4 issues	Comic story	March 2007, April 2007, May 2007, June/July 2007	Steve Behling (#2), Alessandro Sisti (#3, #4, #5)	Disney Publishing Worldwide	Self-contained stories based around the main characters spanning through a few issues, the following stories in order: "Meet the Mysterious... Bowler Hat Guy?!?" (#2), "Robo-Mildred!" (#3), "Snow Problem!" (#4) and two untitled stories involving Carl and Franny Robinson (#5).	No
Men in Black	Men in Black: Movie Adaptation	1 issue	One-shot	October 1997	Lowell Cunningham	Marvel Comics	Adaptation of the original film.	No
Men in Black	Men in Black: Retribution	1 issue	One-shot	December 1997	Lowell Cunningham	Marvel Comics	Sequel comic set immediately after the film.	No
Merrill's Marauders	Dell Movie Classics #12-510-301	1 issue	One-shot	January 1963		Dell Comics	Adaptation of the eponymous film.	No
Merton of the Movies (1947)	Movie Comics #4	1 issue	Comic story	1947	Claude Lapham	Fiction House	Adaptation of the eponymous 1947 film.	No
Meteor	Marvel Comics Super Special #14	1 issue	Magazine, one-shot	February 1980	Ralph Macchio	Marvel Comics	Adaptation of the eponymous film.	No
The Meteor Man (comics)	Meteor Man (film)	1 issue	One-shot	Dwight D. Coye	Marvel Comics	April 1993	Adaptation of the eponymous film; 64 pages tiotal.	No
The Meteor Man (comics)	Meteor Man (series)	6 issues	Limited series	Dwight D. Coye, Bertram B. Hubbard	Marvel Comics	July 1993 – January 1994		No
Mexicali Rose (1939)	Movie Comics #3	1 issue	Photo comics, comic story	June 1939	?	DC Comics	Condensed adaptation of the eponymous film.	No
Mickey Mouse	Silly Symphonies #2: "The Sorcerer's Apprentice"	1 issue	Comic story	September 1953		Dell Comics	Adaptation of the eponymous third segment of the film Fantasia (1940).	No
Mickey Mouse	The Prince and the Pauper	1 volume	Graphic novel	November 1990	Scott Saavedra	W. D. Publications, Inc.	Adaptation of the eponymous 1990 film.	No
Mickey Mouse	Le Journal de Mickey #2296: "Runaway Brain"	1 issue	Comic story	June 19, 1996	Jean-Luc Cochet, David Gerstein (US script)	Disney Hachette Presse S.N.C.	Adaptation of the eponymous 1996 film; originally published in France and reprinted in the United States as Mickey Mouse and Friends #269 by Gemstone Publishing in October 2004.	
Mickey Mouse	Mickey, Donald, Goofy: The Three Musketeers	1 issue	One-shot	September 2004		Gemstone Publishing	Adaptation of the eponymous 2004 film.	No
Mickey Mouse	Mickey's Twice Upon a Christmas	1 issue	One-shot	November 2004		Gemstone Publishing	Adaptation of the eponymous film.	No
The Mikado (1939)	Movie Comics #3	1 issue	Photo comics, comic story	June 1939	?	DC Comics	Condensed adaptation of the eponymous 1939 film.	No
Miracle of the White Stallions	Walt Disney's The Miracle of the White Stallions	1 issue	One-shot	June 1963		Gold Key Comics	Adaptation of the eponymous film; 32 pages total.	No
The Misadventures of Merlin Jones	Walt Disney's The Misadventures of Merlin Jones	1 issue	One-shot	May 1964		Gold Key Comics	Adaptation of the eponymous film, plus a "Keys of Knowledge" one-page filler "Wild Animals of North America, Number 26: The Badger".	No
The Misadventures of Merlin Jones	Walt Disney's Merlin Jones as The Monkey's Uncle	1 issue	One-shot	October 1965		Gold Key Comics	Adaptation of the eponymous sequel film.	No
The Million Dollar Duck	Walt Disney's Treasury of Classic Tales: The Million Dollar Duck	13 installments	Newspaper strip	April 4 – June 27, 1971	Frank Reilly	King Features Syndicate	Adaptations of the eponymous film.	
The Million Dollar Duck	Walt Disney Showcase #5: "$1,000,000 Duck"	1 issue	One-shot	October 1971	?	Gold Key Comics	Adaptations of the eponymous film.	No
Minions	Minions	2 issues	Limited series	Didier Ah-Koon	Titan Comics	July – August 2015		
Minions	Minions: Viva Le Boss!	2 issues	Limited series	Stephane Lapuss	Titan Comics	November 2018 – January 2019		
Minions	Minions: Paella!	2 issues	Limited series	Stephane Lapuss	Titan Comics	November – December 2019		
Minions	Minions: Sports!	2 issues	Limited series	Stephane Lapuss	Titan Comics	April—May 2021		
Minions	Minions: Mini Boss	2 issues	Limited series	Stephane Lapuss	Titan Comics	May – June 2022		
Missile to the Moon	Missile to the Moon	1 issue	One-shot	January 2009	Jason Schultz, Darren G. Davis, John Polacek	Bluewater Comics	Adaptation of the eponymous film.	No
Mission: Impossible	Mission: Impossible	1 issue	One-shot	May 1996	Marv Wolfman	Marvel Comics/Paramount Comics	Prequel comic to the first film.	No
The Missourians	Fawcett Movie Comic #11	1 issue	One-shot	April 1951	Leo Dorfman	Fawcett Comics	Adaptation of the eponymous film.	No
Mister Universe (1951)	Movie Love #6	1 issue	Comic story	December 1950	?	Eastern Color Printing		No
Moby Dick (1956)	Four Color (series 2) #717	1 issue	One-shot	August 1956	Paul S. Newman	Dell Comics	Adaptation of the 1956 film version based on the 1851 novel by Herman Melville.	No
The Monster Club	The Monster Club	1 issue	One-shot	1980	Dez Skinn	Pioneer Press	Adaptation of the eponymous film.	
Monster House	Monster House	1 volume	Graphic novel	June 2006	Joshua Dysart, Simeon Wilkins	IDW Publishing	Prequel story to the 2006 film, the comic also features a back-up story titled "Final Roll".	
Monsters, Inc.	Monsters, Inc. (2001)	1 issue	One-shot	October 2001		Dark Horse Comics	First adaptation of the original film.	
Monsters, Inc.	Monsters, Inc.: Laugh Factory	4 issues	Limited series	June – November 2009	Paul Benjamin	Boom! Studios		Monsters, Inc.: Laugh Factory TPB
Monsters, Inc.	Monsters, Inc.: The Story of the Movie in Comics	2 issues	Limited series	February – March 2013		Marvel Comics	Second adaptation of the original film.	Monsters, Inc.: Scary Stories TPB
Monsters, Inc.	Monsters, Inc.: A Perfect Date	1 issue	One-shot	February 2013	Alessandro Ferrari	Marvel Comics		Monsters, Inc.: Scary Stories TPB
Monsters, Inc.	Monsters, Inc.: The Humanween Party	1 issue	One-shot	April 2013	Alessandro Ferrari	Marvel Comics		Monsters, Inc.: Scary Stories TPB
Monsters, Inc.	Monsters University: Official Movie Magazine	1 issue	Magazine	June 2013		Marvel Comics	The magazine features a comic adaptation of the second film.	
Monsters, Inc.	Monsters, Inc. (2018)	1 volume	OEL manga	December 2018	Hiromi Yamafuji	Tokyopop	Manga adaptation of the original film.	
Montana (1950)	Montana	1 issue	One-shot	1950	Joe Millard	Fawcett Comics	Adaptation of the eponymous film.	No
Moon Pilot	Four Color (series 2) #1313	1 issue	One-shot	March 1962	Robert Buckner	Dell Comics	Adaptation of the eponymous film, plus one-page filler stories, "The Explorers" and "Moon Lore".	No
The Moon-Spinners	Walt Disney's The Moon-Spinners	1 issue	One-shot	October 1964	?	Gold Key Comics	Adaptation of the eponymous film; 32 pages total.	No
Moon Zero Two	The House of Hammer #5	1 issue	Comic story	February 1977		Top Sellers Ltd.	Adaptation of the eponymous film.	No
Moonwalker	Blackthorne 3-D Series #75: "Moonwalker 3-D"	1 issue	One-shot	July 1989	John Stephenson	Blackthorne Publishing	Adaptation of the eponymous film; originally first published in anaglyph 3-D.	No
Morgan, the Pirate	Four Color (series 2) #1227	1 issue	One-shot	1961		Dell Comics	Adaptation of the eponymous film, plus one-page filler "Prizes of the Spanish Main".	No
Motel Hell	Motel Hell	3 issues	Limited series	October – December 2010	Matt Nixon	IDW Publishing	Adaptation of the eponymous film; published by IDW under the short-lived "Midnite Movies" imprint.	Midnite Movies: Motel Hell/It! The Terror from Beyond Space TPB
The Mouse on the Moon	Dell Movie Classics #12-530-312	1 issue	One-shot	October–December 1963	Don Segall	Dell Comics	Adaptation of the eponymous film.	No
Mr. Peabody & Sherman	Mr. Peabody & Sherman	5 issues	Limited series	November 2013 – January 2014	Sholly Fisch	IDW Publishing	Set before the eponymous film, which was released four months later.	Mr. Peabody & Sherman TPB
Mrs. Mike	Movie Love #1	1 issue	One-shot	February 1950		Eastern Color Printing	Adaptation of the eponymous film.	No
The Mummy	Dell Movie Classics #12-537-211: "The Mummy" (1962)	1 issue	One-shot	September–November 1962	Don Segall	Dell Comics	Based on the Universal film series version.	No
The Mummy	The House of Hammer #15: "The Mummy's Shroud"	1 issue	Comic story	December 1977		Top Sellers Ltd.	Adaptation of the third installment in the Hammer film series.	No
The Mummy	The House of Hammer #22: "The Mummy" (1978)	1 issue	Comic story	July 1978		Top Sellers Ltd.	Adaptation of the 1959 film, the first installment in the Hammer film series.	No
The Mummy	The Mummy (1991)	4 issues	Limited series	March – October 1991		Monster Comics	Adaptation of the 1932 film, the first installment in the Universal film series.	No
The Mummy	Universal Monsters: The Mummy (1993)	1 issues	One-shot	November 1993	Dan Jolley	Dark Horse Comics	Adaptation of the 1932 film; fourth installment in Dark Horse's Universal Monsters comic line.	
The Mummy	The Mummy: Valley of the Gods	1 issue	Limited series (planned)	May 2001	Marv Wolfman, Matt Broome	Chaos! Comics	Set in the continuity of the 1999 film series; planned three-issue limited series cancelled after one issue.	No
The Mummy	The Mummy: The Rise and Fall of Xango's Ax	4 issues	Limited series	April – July 2008	Joshua Jabcuga	IDW Publishing	Set in the continuity of the 1999 film series.	The Mummy: The Rise and Fall of Xango's Ax TPB
The Mummy	The Mummy: Palimpsest	4 issues	Limited series	December 2016 – May 2017	Peter Milligan	Titan Comics	Based on the Hammer film series version.	The Mummy: Palimpsest TPB
The Mummy	Universal Monsters: The Mummy (2025)	4 issues	Limited series	March – June 2025	Faith Erin Hicks	Image Comics	Based on the Universal film series version.	
The Muppets Take Manhattan	The Muppets Take Manhattan	3 issue	Limited series	November 1984 – January 1985	Stan Kay	Marvel Comics/Star Comics	Adaptation of the third film in the Muppets franchise; first published as Marvel Comics Super Special #32 in October 1984.	No
The Music Man (1962)	Dell Movie Classics #12-538-301	1 issue	One-shot	January 1963		Dell Comics	Adaptation of the eponymous film.	No
Mutiny	Movie Love #16	1 issue	Comic story	August 1952	?	Eastern Color Printing	Adaptation of the eponymous film.	No
Mutiny on the Blackhawk	Movie Comics #6	1 issue	Comic story	October 1939	?	DC Comics	Condensed adaptation of the eponymous film.	No
Mutiny on the Bounty (1962)	Mutiny on the Bounty	1 issue	One-shot	February 1963		Gold Key Comics	Adaptation of the 1962 film version based on the 1932 novel by Charles Nordhoff and James Norman Hall.	No
My Little Pony: The Movie (2017)	My Little Pony: The Movie Prequel	4 issues	Limited series	Ted Anderson	IDW Publishing	June – September 2017	Prequel comic to the eponymous film.	
Mysterious Island (1951)	Four Color (series 2) #1213	1 issue	One-shot	January 1962		Dell Comics	Adaptation of the 1961 film version based on the 1875 novel by Jules Verne, plus two one-page fillers "Balloons at War" and a preview of the story overall.	No
Mysterious Island (1951)	Back to Mysterious Island	4 issues	Limited series	July – October 2008	Max Landis, Kevin Gentilcore	TidalWave Productions	Sequel comic.	
Mystery Men	Mystery Men: Movie Adaptation	2 issues	Limited series	July – August 1999	Bob Fingerman	Dark Horse Comics	Adaptation of the eponymous film based on Flaming Carrot Comics by Bob Burden.	No
Mystery of the White Room	Movie Comics #3	1 issue	Photo comics, comic story	June 1939	?	Fawcett Comics	Condensed adaptation of the eponymous film.	No

== N ==
Based on	Title	Length	Format	Publication date	Authors	Publisher	Notes	Collected editions
The Naked Prey	Dell Movie Classics #12-545-612	1 issue	One-shot	December 1966	?	Dell Comics	Adaptation of the eponymous film.	No
Napoleon and Samantha	Walt Disney Showcase #10	1 issue	One-shot	September 1972	Mary Virginia Carey	Gold Key Comics	Adaptation of the eponymous film.	No
Napoleon Dynamite	Napoleon Dynamite	4 issues	Limited series	September – December 2019	Carlos Guzman-Verdugo, Alejandro Verdugo	IDW Publishing		Napoleon Dynamite: Impeach Pedro TP (1-68405-637-3/978-1-68405-637-8)
Napoleon Dynamite	Napoleon Dynamite Valentine's Day Special	1 issue	One-shot	February 2020	Megan Brown	IDW Publishing		Napoleon Dynamite: Impeach Pedro TP (1-68405-637-3/978-1-68405-637-8)
Navy Secrets	Movie Comics #3	1 issue	Photo comics	June 1939	?	DC Comics	Condensed adaptation of the eponymous film.	No
New Mexico	Movie Love #8	1 issue	One-shot	April 1951	?	Eastern Color Printing	Adaptation of the eponymous film.	No
The Night of the Grizzly	Dell Movie Classics #12-558-612	1 issue	One-shot	December 1966	?	Dell Comics	Adaptation of the eponymous film.	No
Night of the Living Dead	Night of the Living Dead: Prelude	1 issue	One-shot	1991	Tom Skulan, Eric Stanway	FantaCo Enterprises	Prelude issue that accompanied the four-issue miniseries based on the 1968 film, expanding the themes originally expressed in the original film.	
Night of the Living Dead	Night of the Living Dead (1991)	4 issues	Limited series	November 1991 – October 1992	Tom Skulan, Eric Stanway	FantaCo Enterprises		
Night of the Living Dead	Night of the Living Dead: Aftermath	1 issue	One-shot	1992		FantaCo Enterprises		
Night of the Living Dead	Night of the Living Dead (1993)	4 issues	Limited series	1993	Noel Hannan	FantaCo Enterprises		Paperback: 0-938782-30-4
Night of the Living Dead	Night of the Living Dead: London	2 issues	Limited series	1993	Clive Barker, Steve Niles	FantaCo Enterprises		Paperback: 0-938782-31-2
Night of the Living Dead	George A. Romero's Dawn of the Dead	3 issues	Limited series	April – June 2004		IDW Publishing	Adaptation of the second film.	
Night of the Living Dead	Night of the Living Dead: Barbara's Zombie Chronicles	3 issues	Limited series	September – November 2004		Dead Dog Press		
Night of the Living Dead	Toe Tags — Featuring George A. Romero #1—6: "The Death of Death"	6 issues	Comic story, serial	December 2004 – May 2005	George A. Romero	DC Comics		Paperback 978-1-4012-4953-3
Night of the Living Dead	George A. Romero's Land of the Dead	5 issues	Limited series	September 2005 – January 2006		IDW Publishing	Adaptation of the fourth film.	
Night of the Living Dead	Escape of the Living Dead	5 issues	Limited series	September 2005 – March 2006		Avatar Press		
Night of the Living Dead	Escape of the Living Dead: Fearbook	1 issue	One-shot	August 2006		Avatar Press		
Night of the Living Dead	Escape of the Living Dead: Airborne	3 issues	Limited series	August – November 2006	John Russo, Mike Wolfer	Avatar Press		
Night of the Living Dead	Escape of the Living Dead Annual	1 issue	One-shot	March 2007		Avatar Press		
Night of the Living Dead	Night of the Living Dead: Back from the Grave	1 issue	One-shot	August 2006	John Russo, Mike Wolfer	Avatar Press		
Night of the Living Dead	Night of the Living Dead: Just a Girl	1 issue	One-shot	November 2006		Avatar Press		
Night of the Living Dead	Night of the Living Dead: The Beginning	3 issues	Limited series	November 2006 – February 2007		Avatar Press		
Night of the Living Dead	Night of the Living Dead: Hunger	1 issue	One-shot	July 2007		Avatar Press		
Night of the Living Dead	Plague of the Living Dead	6 issues	Limited series	April – October 2007		Avatar Press		
Night of the Living Dead	Night of the Living Dead Annual	1 issue	One-shot	June 2008		Avatar Press		
Night of the Living Dead	Night of the Living Dead: New York	1 issue	One-shot	2009		Avatar Press		
Night of the Living Dead	Night of the Living Dead (2010)	6 issues	Limited series	September 2010 – May 2011	John Russo, Mike Wolfer	Avatar Press		
Night of the Living Dead	Night of the Living Dead Holiday Special	1 issue	One-shot	October 2010	Mike Wolfer	Avatar Press		
Night of the Living Dead	Night of the Living Dead: Death Valley	5 issues	Limited series	February – October 2011	Mike Wolfer	Avatar Press		
Night of the Living Dead	Night of the Living Dead 2011 Annual	1 issue	One-shot	March 2011	Mike Wolfer	Avatar Press		
Night of the Living Dead	Night of the Living Dead: Day of the Undead			June 2012		Avatar Press		
Night of the Living Dead	Night of the Living Dead: Aftermath	12 issues	Limited series	October 2012 – September 2013	David Hine	Avatar Press		
Night of the Living Dead	Empire of the Dead	15 issues	Limited series	March 2014 – November 2015	George A. Romero	Marvel Comics	Originally published as three separate miniseries: Act One (March – August 2014), Act Two (November 2014 – March 2015) and Act Three (June – November 2015).	Empire of the Dead: Act One TP (978-0-7851-8517-8); Empire of the Dead: Act Two TP (978-0-7851-8519-2); Empire of the Dead: Act Three TP (978-0-7851-8520-8)
Nightbreed	Clive Barker's Nightbreed (1990)	25 issues	Ongoing series	April 1990 – March 1993	Alan Grant, John Wagner, D.G. Chichester, Greg Wright, Nicholas Vincent, James Moore	Epic Comics	Briefly retitled Nightbreed vs. Rawhead Rex from issues #13 to #16 to accommodate the four-part crossover storyline with another Clive Barker property of the same name, "Return of the King".	
Nightbreed	Hellraiser/Nightbreed: Jihad	2 issues	Limited series	January – February 1991	D.G. Chichester	Epic Comics	Crossover with Hellraiser, another Clive Barker property.	
Nightbreed	Clive Barker's Nightbreed (2014)	12 issues	Limited series	May 2014 – April 2015	Clive Barker, Marc Andreyko	Boom! Studios		
A Nightmare on Elm Street (comics)	Freddy Krueger's A Nightmare on Elm Street	2 issues	Magazine	October – November 1989	Steve Gerber	Marvel Comics		
A Nightmare on Elm Street (comics)	Nightmares on Elm Street	6 issues	Ongoing series	September 1991 – July 1992	Andy Mangels	Innovation Publishing		
A Nightmare on Elm Street (comics)	Freddy's Dead: The Final Nightmare	3 issues	Limited series	October – December 1991	Andy Mangels	Innovation Publishing	Adaptation of the sixth film in the series.	
A Nightmare on Elm Street (comics)	A Nightmare on Elm Street: The Beginning	2 issues	Limited series (planned)	Summer – Fall 1992	Andy Mangels	Innovation Publishing		
A Nightmare on Elm Street (comics)	A Nightmare on Elm Street Special	1 issue	One-shot	April 2005	Brian Pulido	Avatar Press		
A Nightmare on Elm Street (comics)	A Nightmare on Elm Street: Paranoid	3 issues	Limited series	November 2005 – June 2006	Brian Pulido	Avatar Press		
A Nightmare on Elm Street (comics)	A Nightmare on Elm Street: Fearbook	1 issue	One-shot	June 2006	Brian Pulido	Avatar Press		
A Nightmare on Elm Street (comics)	A Nightmare on Elm Street	8 issues	Limited series	December 2006 – August 2007	Chuck Dixon	WildStorm		
A Nightmare on Elm Street (comics)	New Line Cinema's Tales of Horror #1: "Copycat"	1 issue	Comic story, one-shot	November 2007	Christos Gage	WildStorm		
Nikki: Wild Dog of the North	Four Color (series 2) #1226	1 issue	One-shot	October–December 1961	Eric Freiwald, Robert Schaefer	Dell Comics	Adaptation of the eponymous film.	No
Ninja Scroll	Ninja Scroll	12 issues	Limited series	November 2006 – October 2007	J. Torres, Kelley Puckett	WildStorm		Paperback: 1-4012-1318-9/978-1-4012-1318-3
No Escape (1994)	No Escape	3 issues	Limited series	Roger Salick	Marvel Comics	June – August 1994	Adaptation of the eponymous film.	No
No Time for Sergeants	Four Color (series 2) #914	1 issue	One-shot	?	Dell Comics	July 1958	Adaptation of the eponymous film.	No
None but the Brave	Dell Movie Classics #12-565-506	1 issue	One-shot	April–June 1965	?	Dell Comics	Adaptation of the eponymous film.	No
The North Avenue Irregulars	Walt Disney Showcase #49	1 issue	One-shot	March 1979	Mary Virginia Carey	Gold Key Comics	Adaptation of the eponymous film.	No
North to Alaska	Four Color (series 2) #1155	1 issue	One-shot	January–March 1961	Gaylord DuBois	Dell Comics	Adaptation of the eponymous film.	No
Northwest Stampede	Cowboy Western Comics #25	1 issue	One-shot	December 1949	?	Charlton Comics	Adaptation of the eponymous film.	No
Nosferatu	Nosferatu: Plague of Terror	4 issues	Limited series	May – November 1991	Mark Ellis, Richard Pace	Millennium Publications		
Nosferatu	Nosferatu (1991)	2 issues	Limited series	July – August 1991	Rafael Nieves	Tome Press		
Nosferatu	Nosferatu: The Death Mass	4 issues	Limited series	December 1997 – March 1998	Holden Morris	Venus Comics		
Nosferatu	Batman: Nosferatu	1 volume	Graphic novel	March 1999	Jean-Marc Lofficier, Randy Lofficier	DC Comics		Paperback: 1-56389-379-7
Nosferatu	Silent Screamers: Nosferatu 1922	1 issue	One-shot	October 2000	Alex Glass, Nelson Asencio, Jason Orfalas	Image Comics		
Nosferatu	Nosferatu (2010)			December 2010		Viper Comics		
Nosferatu	Nosferatu!			December 2019		Toonhound Studios		
Nyoka the Jungle Girl	Nyoka the Jungle Girl (series 1)	78 issues	Ongoing series	September 1942, Winter 1942 – June 1953	Rod Reed	Fawcett Comics	The first issue, titled Jungle Girl — Featuring the Perils of Nyoka from #1, was an adaptation of the second serial film Perils of Nyoka (1942), presented in six chapters: "Chapter I: Doom in the Desert" (eleven pages), "Chapter II: Valley of Sacrifice" (ten pages), "Chapter III: Vultura's Vengeance" (twelve pages), "Chapter IV: Treasure of Terror!" (seven pages), "Chapter V: The Finger of Fate" (six pages) and "Chapter VI: Climax of Conquest" (five pages); also featuring "The Three Legionnaires", a prose story written by Nathaniel Nitkin (two pages), and two gag comics featuring Willie Wynn (six pages) and The Mad Artist (one page).	
Nyoka the Jungle Girl	Nyoka the Jungle Girl (series 2)	9 issues	Ongoing series	November 1955 – November 1957		Charlton Comics	Continuation of the original series from the numbering of the Fawcett Comics publication (#14—22).	
Nyoka the Jungle Girl	The Further Adventures of Nyoka the Jungle Girl	7 issues	Limited series	1988 – 2005		AC Comics		

== O ==
Based on	Title	Length	Format	Publication date	Authors	Publisher	Notes	Collected editions
The Oklahoman	Four Color (series 2) #820	1 issue	One-shot	June 1957	Paul S. Newman	Dell Comics	Adaptation of the eponymous film.	No
The Old Frontier	Fawcett Movie Comic #10	1 issue	Comic story	February 1951	Leo Dorfman	Fawcett Comics	Adaptation of the eponymous film.	No
Old Yeller	Four Color (series 2) #869	1 issue	One-shot	January 1958	?	Dell Comics	Adaptation of the eponymous film.	No
On the Double	Four Color (series 2) #1232	1 issue	One-shot	September–November 1961	?	Dell Comics	Adaptation of the eponymous film.	No
Once Upon a Time (1973)	Fix und Foxi #39–48: "Maria d'Oro und Bello Blue"	9 issues	Comic story, serial	September 21 – November 16, 1973	Rolf Kauka, Roberto Gavioli	Gevacur AG	Adaptation of Once Upon a Time (1973); originally published in German.	Maria d'Oro und Bello Blue TPB
One Million Years B.C.	The House of Hammer #14	1 issue	Comic story	November 1977	Steve Moore	Top Sellers Ltd.	Adaptation of the eponymous film.	No
Operation Bikini	Dell Movie Classics #12-597-310	1 issue	One-shot	October 1963	?	Dell Comics	Adaptation of the eponymous film.	No
Operation Crossbow	Dell Movie Classics #12-590-512	1 issue	One-shot	October–December 1965	?	Dell Comics	Adaptation of the eponymous film.	No
Operation Secret	Movie Love #18	1 issue	One-shot	October–December 1952	?	Eastern Color Printing	Adaptation of the eponymous film.	No
Orca (1977)	Orca (オルカ)	1 issue	Magazine	January 1978	Kyuta Ishikawa	Akita Shoten	Gekiga adaptation of the eponymous 1977 film; Published in Monthly Shōnen Champion.	No
Orca (1977)	Orca	1 issue	One-shot	July 1978	Judah Noor	Sastra Kumala	Indonesian adaptation of the eponymous 1977 film (24 pages) plus a supplementary one-page story "Get to Know Animal Life - Dolphin's Fate".	No
The Oregon Trail (1939)	Movie Comics #4–6	3 issues	Photo comics, serial	July – October 1939	?	DC Comics	Condensed adaptation of the eponymous 1939 serial film.	No
Our Very Own	Movie Love #5	1 issue	One-shot	October 1950	?	Eastern Color Printing	Adaptation of the eponymous film.	No
Outland	Heavy Metal (volume 5) #3–6 +10	5 issues	Magazine, serial	June 1981 – October 1981 (parts 1–4), January 1982 (part 5)	Jim Steranko	HM Communications, Inc.	Serialized adaptation of the eponymous film.	No

== P ==
Based on	Title	Length	Format	Publication date	Authors	Publisher	Notes	Collected editions
Pandora and the Flying Dutchman	Movie Love #11	1 issue	One-shot	October 1951	?	Eastern Color Printing	Adaptation of the eponymous film.	No
The Parent Trap (1961)	Walt Disney's Treasury of Classic Tales: The Parent Trap	13 installlments	Newspaper strip	July 2 – September 24, 1961	Frank Reilly	King Features Syndicate	Adaptations of the eponymous film; the art for the strip version was drawn by Jesse Marsh while the art for the book version (32 pages total) was done by Dan Spiegle.	
The Parent Trap (1961)	Four Color (series 2) #1210	1 issue	One-shot	September–November 1961	?	Dell Comics	Adaptations of the eponymous film; the art for the strip version was drawn by Jesse Marsh while the art for the book version (32 pages total) was done by Dan Spiegle.	No
Passage West (1951)	Movie Love #10	1 issue	One-shot	August 1951	?	Eastern Color Printing	Adaptation of the eponymous film.	No
Pathfinder (2007)	Pathfinder: An American Saga	1 volume	Graphic novel	July 2006	Laeta Kalogridis, Christopher Shy	Dark Horse Comics	Adaptation of the eponymous film.	
Pete's Dragon (1977)	Walt Disney's Treasury of Classic Tales: Pete's Dragon	13 installlments	Newspaper strip	September 4 – November 27, 1977	Carl Fallberg	King Features Syndicate	Adaptations of the eponymous film; the art for the strip version was drawn by Richard Moore while the art for the book version (32 pages total) was done by Dan Spiegle with Larry Mayer who drew Elliott the dragon.	
Pete's Dragon (1977)	Walt Disney Showcase #43	1 issue	One-shot	April 1978	Mary Virginia Carey	Gold Key Comics	Adaptations of the eponymous film; the art for the strip version was drawn by Richard Moore while the art for the book version (32 pages total) was done by Dan Spiegle with Larry Mayer who drew Elliott the dragon.	No
Peter Pan (1953)	Walt Disney's Treasury of Classic Tales: Peter Pan	24 installlments	Newspaper strip	January 4 – June 14, 1953	Frank Reilly	King Features Syndicate	Adaptation of the eponymous film in newspaper strip format; art by Manuel Gonzales and Dick Moores.	No
Peter Pan (1953)	Walt Disney's Peter Pan Treasure Chest	1 issue	One-shot	January 1953		Dell Comics	Adaptation of the film in comic book format (54 pages total), followed by a back-up story "Donald Duck Meets Peter Pan" (20 pages), a story involving Wendy and Tinker Bell (12 pages), a story concerning Mr. Smee (10 pages), a "Mickey Mouse and Peter Pan" story (20 pages), "Captain Hook and the Buried Treasure" (32 pages), a story set in Mermaid Lagoon titled "Bubbles the Water Baby" (12 pages), and two stories about Nana, "Nursemaid Nana" (12 pages), and John and Michael (16 pages), a text article "Destination Neverland!" (2 pages) and plus thirteen activity pages (eight one-page activities, four two-page activities, a page with song lyrics, for the songs "Tee Dum, Tee Dee" and "What Made the Red Man Red?", and a coloring page depicting the pirate ship); part of the Dell Giant comic book line, the artwork was done by Al Hubbard, Bob Moore, Dick Moores, Harvey Eisenberg and Jack Bradbury.	No
Peter Pan (1953)	New Adventures of Peter Pan	1 issue	Minicomic	1953	Don Christensen	Western Publishing	Giveaway promo for Admiral; 30 pages total, art by Al Hubbard.	No
Peter Pan (1953)	Four Color (series 2) #442: "Peter Pan"	1 issue	One-shot	December 1952	Del Connell	Dell Comics	Adaptation of the film, redrawn and abridged; 32 pages total, art by Al Hubbard.	No
Peter Pan (1953)	Four Color (series 2) #446: "Captain Hook and Peter Pan"	1 issue	One-shot	January 1953		Dell Comics	Follow-up to Four Color #442; original story revolving around a treasure hunt, 32 pages total. Two-page activities inside front cover (a "treasure map" crossword) and back cover (stand-up cut-outs of Captain Hook and Peter Pan) respectively.	No
Peter Pan (1953)	Four Color (series 2) #896: "Adventures of Tinker Bell"	1 issue	One-shot	April 1958	Carl Fallberg	Dell Comics		No
Peter Pan (1953)	Four Color (series 2) #982: "The New Adventures of Tinker Bell"	1 issue	One-shot	April—June 1959	Carl Fallberg	Dell Comics		No
The Phantom Creeps	Movie Comics #6	1 issue	One-shot	September–October 1939	?	DC Comics	Condensed adaptation of the eponymous film.	No
The Phantom Planet	Four Color (series 2) #1234	1 issue	One-shot	November 1961-January 1962	?	Dell Comics	Adaptation of the eponymous film.	No
Pinocchio (1940)	Silly Symphony: Pinocchio	16 installments	Newspaper strip	December 24, 1939 – April 7, 1940	Merrill De Maris	King Features Syndicate	First adaptation of the eponymous film in newspaper strip format; the artwork for this version was drawn by Hank Porter (pencil) and Bob Grant (ink).	
Pinocchio (1940)	Walt Disney's Comics and Stories #63, #64: "Pinocchio"	2 issues	Back-up feature	December 1945, January 1946	Carl Buettner	Dell Comics	Pinocchio and Jiminy Cricket were featured in self-contained back-up strips as try to escape from and thwart the exploits of Honest John and Gideon.	
Pinocchio (1940)	Four Color (series 2) #92: "The Wonderful Adventures of Pinocchio"	1 issue	One-shot	January 1946	Chase Craig	Dell Comics	Adaptation of the film (35 pages total), followed by a back-up story "The Wonderful Mis-Adventures of Donocchio", featuring Donald Duck in the Pinocchio role (16 pages total); the artwork for this version was drawn by Walt Kelly.	
Pinocchio (1940)	Four Color (series 2) #252: "Walt Disney's Pinocchio"	1 issue	One-shot	November 1949		Dell Comics	Re-adaptation of the film with different artwork (32 pages total) compiled with three one-page back-up strips drawn by Tony Strobl, two on inside front and back covers and one on back cover; the artwork for this version was possibly done by Tony Pabian.	
Pinocchio (1940)	Pinocchio Learns About Kites	1 issue	Minicomic	January 1953	?	Western Publishing	Reddy Kilowatt, Inc. premium; author of this comic unknown, attributed to Walt Disney.	No
Pinocchio (1940)	Four Color (series 2) #701, #795, #897, #989: "Walt Disney's Jiminy Cricket"	4 issues	One-shot	May 1956, May 1957, May 1958, May—July 1959	Carl Fallberg	Dell Comics	Self-contained episodic stories featuring the eponymous side character.	
Pinocchio (1940)	Silly Symphonies #7, 8, 9	2 issues	Back-up feature	February 1957, February 1958	?	Dell Comics	Jiminy Cricket was featured in three self-contained stories in three issues of this series: "Jiminy Cricket in The Reckless Rescuer" (#7, nine pages), "Jiminy Cricket and the Big Little Show" (#8, eight pages) and "Toy Train Trickery" (#9, ten pages); art by Al Hubbard (#7, 8) and Paul Murry (#9).	
Pinocchio (1940)	Walt Disney's Summer Fun #2	1 issue	Back-up feature	August 1959	?	Dell Comics	Jiminy Cricket was featured in the back-up story "Daredevil Dusters", which also guest featured Dumbo and Timothy Q. Mouse (from Dumbo); eight pages total, art by Paul Murry.	
Pinocchio (1940)	Walt Disney's Treasury of Classic Tales: Pinocchio	13 installlments	Newspaper strip	September 3 – November 26, 1978	Carl Fallberg	King Features Syndicate	Second adaptation of the film in newspaper strip format; art by Richard Moore.	No
Pinocchio (1940)	Walt Disney's Treasury of Classic Tales: Pinocchio and Jiminy Cricket in "A Coat Tale"	14 installlments	Newspaper strip	September 30 – December 30, 1984	Carl Fallberg	King Features Syndicate	Original story; art by Richard Moore.	No
Pinocchio and the Emperor of the Night	Pinocchio and the Emperor of the Night	1 issue	One-shot	March 1988	Sid Jacobson	Marvel Comics	Adaptation of the eponymous film.	No
Pinocchio in Outer Space	Tintin #866	1 issue	One-shot	May 1965	Willy Lateste	Le Lombard	Adaptation of the eponymous film.	
Pioneer Marshal	Pioneer Marshal	1 issue	One-shot	1950	Joe Millard	Fawcett Comics	Adaptation of the eponymous film.	No
Pirates of the Caribbean	Disney Adventures		Comic story, ongoing series	August 2003, December/January 2004, Winter 2004, March 2004, May 2004, August 2004, February 2005, March 2005, November 2006, June/July 2007, October 2007		Disney Publishing Worldwide	Self-contained stories spanning several issues, the following stories in order: "Revenge of the Pirates!", "The Capture of Jack Sparrow!", "Legend of the Aztec Idol!", "In Jack We Trust!", "A Revolting Development!", "The Duel!", "Chain Reaction!", "Going Overboard!", "The Compass of Destiny! Part Two", "Jailbreak!", "The Eye of Despair!".	
Pirates of the Caribbean	Disney Junior Graphic Novel #4: Pirates of the Caribbean: Dead Man's Chest	1 volume	Graphic novel	May 2007		Disney Press	Adaptation of the second film.	Paperback: 978-1-4231-0370-7
Pirates of the Caribbean	Disney Junior Graphic Novel #5: Pirates of the Caribbean: At World's End	1 volume	Graphic novel	October 2007		Disney Press	Adaptation of the third film.	Paperback: 978-1-4231-0449-0
Pirates of the Caribbean	Pirates of the Caribbean: Beyond Port Royal	#1–4	Limited series	September 2016 – February 2017		Joe Books Inc.		
Pirates of the Caribbean	Pirates of the Caribbean: Dead Men Tell No Tales: Movie Graphic Novel	1 volume	Graphic novel	June 2017		Joe Books Inc.	Adaptation of the fifth film.	Paperback: 978-1-77275-525-1
The Plague of the Zombies	The House of Hammer #13	1 issue	One-shot	October 1977	Steve Moore	Top Sellers Ltd.	Adaptation of the eponymous film.	No
Plan 9 from Outer Space	Plan 9 from Outer Space	1 issue	One-shot	October 1990	John Wooley	Malibu Comics	Adaptation of the eponymous film.	
Plan 9 from Outer Space	Plan 9 from Outer Space: Thirty Years Later!	3 issues	Limited series	January – March 1991	John Wooley	Eternity Comics	Sequel to the eponymous film.	
Plan 9 from Outer Space	Plan 9 from Outer Space Strikes Again!	1 issue	Limited series (planned)	March 2009	Chad Helder	TidalWave Productions		
Planet of the Apes (comics)	Beneath the Planet of the Apes	1 issue	One-shot	December 1970	Paul S. Newman	Gold Key Comics	First adaptation of the second film.	
Planet of the Apes (comics)	Planet of the Apes (1974)	29 issues	Magazine, serial	August 1974 – February 1977	Doug Moench	Marvel Comics	The complete original film series was adapted into comic book format spanning across 28 issues "Planet of the Apes" (#1—6, August 1974 – March 1975), "Beneath the Planet of the Apes" (#7—11, April – August 1975), "Escape from the Planet of the Apes" (#12—16, September 1975 – January 1976), "Conquest of the Planet of the Apes" (#17—21, February – June 1976) and "Battle for the Planet of the Apes" (#23—28, August 1976 – January 1977); the adaptation of Conquest was followed by a two-part original sequel storyline "Quest for the Planet of the Apes", also written by Moench, in #22 (July 1976). All five stories alternated with two original ongoing features: "Terror on the Planet of the Apes", which spanned across nineteen installments through fifteen issues (#1, 2, 3, 4, 6, 8, 11, 13, 14, 19, 20, 23, 26, 27, 28) and "Future History Chronicles" which ran through five issues (#12, 15, 17, 24, 29). The adaptations of the first two films were later reprinted in full color as an eleven issue limited series Adventures on the Planet of the Apes (October 1975 – December 1976). The "Terror" storyline was reprinted by Adventure Publications as a separate four issue limited series (July – December 1991), with an introduction by the series' writer Doug Moench.	
Planet of the Apes (comics)	Planet of the Apes (1990)	24 issues	Ongoing series	April 1990 – July 1992	Charles Marshall	Adventure Publications		
Planet of the Apes (comics)	Ape City	4 issues	Limited series	August – November 1990	Charles Marshall	Adventure Publications		
Planet of the Apes (comics)	Planet of the Apes Annual	1 issue	One-shot	1991	Charles Marshall	Adventure Publications		
Planet of the Apes (comics)	Planet of the Apes: Urchak's Folly	4 issues	Limited series	January – April 1991		Adventure Publications		
Planet of the Apes (comics)	Ape Nation	4 issues	Limited series	February – June 1991	Charles Marshall	Adventure Publications	Crossover with Alien Nation.	
Planet of the Apes (comics)	Planet of the Apes: Blood of the Apes	4 issues	Limited series	November 1991 – February 1992		Adventure Publications		
Planet of the Apes (comics)	Planet of the Apes: Urchak's Folly	4 issues	Limited series	January – April 1991		Adventure Publications		
Planet of the Apes (comics)	Planet of the Apes: Sins of the Father	1 issue	One-shot	March 1992	Mike Valerio	Adventure Publications		
Planet of the Apes (comics)	Planet of the Apes: The Forbidden Zone	4 issues	Limited series	December 1992 – March 1993		Adventure Publications		
Planet of the Apes (comics)	Planet of the Apes: The Human War	3 issues	Limited series	June – August 2001	Ian Edginton	Dark Horse Comics	All three comics based on the 2001 film; the first comics is a four issue sequel limited series set decades after the events of the film, the second is a single volume adaptation of the overall film and the third is a six issue ongoing series continuation of the storyline begun in the Human War series.	
Planet of the Apes (comics)	Planet of the Apes: An Official Adaptation of the Tim Burton Movie!	1 volume	Graphic novel	July 2001	Scott Allie	Dark Horse Comics	All three comics based on the 2001 film; the first comics is a four issue sequel limited series set decades after the events of the film, the second is a single volume adaptation of the overall film and the third is a six issue ongoing series continuation of the storyline begun in the Human War series.	
Planet of the Apes (comics)	Planet of the Apes (2001)	6 issues	Limited series	September 2001 – February 2002	Ian Edginton (#1–3), Dan Abnett (#4–6)	Dark Horse Comics	All three comics based on the 2001 film; the first comics is a four issue sequel limited series set decades after the events of the film, the second is a single volume adaptation of the overall film and the third is a six issue ongoing series continuation of the storyline begun in the Human War series.	
Planet of the Apes (comics)	Revolution on the Planet of the Apes	6 issues	Limited series	December 2005 – August 2006	Ty Templeton, Joe O'Brien	Mr. Comics		
Planet of the Apes (comics)	Planet of the Apes (2011)	16 issues	Ongoing series	April 2011 – July 2012	Daryl Gregory	Boom! Studios	Continuation based on the 1968 film series.	
Planet of the Apes (comics)	Betrayal of the Planet of the Apes	4 issues	Limited series	November 2011 – February 2012	Gabriel Hardman, Corinna Sara Bechko	Boom! Studios		
Planet of the Apes (comics)	Exile on the Planet of the Apes	4 issues	Limited series	March – June 2012	Gabriel Hardman, Corinna Sara Bechko	Boom! Studios		
Planet of the Apes (comics)	Planet of the Apes Annual	1 issue	One-shot	August 2012	Jeff Parker, Gabriel Hardman, Corinna Sara Bechko, Daryl Gregory	Boom! Studios		
Planet of the Apes (comics)	Planet of the Apes: Cataclysm	12 issues	Limited series	September 2012 – August 2013	Gabriel Hardman, Corinna Sara Bechko	Boom! Studios		
Planet of the Apes (comics)	Planet of the Apes Special	1 issue	One-shot	April 2013	Daryl Gregory	Boom! Studios		
Planet of the Apes (comics)	Planet of the Apes Spectacular	1 issue	One-shot	July 2013	Daryl Gregory	Boom! Studios		
Planet of the Apes (comics)	Planet of the Apes Giant	1 issue	One-shot	September 2013	Daryl Gregory	Boom! Studios		
Planet of the Apes (comics)	Dawn of the Planet of the Apes	6 issues	Limited series	November 2014 – April 2015	Michael Moreci	Boom! Studios	Set between Rise and Dawn.	
Planet of the Apes (comics)	Star Trek/Planet of the Apes: The Primate Directive	5 issues	Limited series	December 2014 – April 2015	Scott Tipton, David Tipton	IDW Publishing, Boom! Studios	Crossover with Star Trek: The Original Series.	
Planet of the Apes (comics)	Tarzan on the Planet of the Apes	5 issues	Limited series	September 2016 – January 2017	Tim Seeley, David Walker	Dark Horse Comics, Boom! Studios	Crossover with Tarzan.	
Planet of the Apes (comics)	Planet of the Apes/Green Lantern	6 issues	Limited series	February – July 2017	Robbie Thompson, Justin Jordan	Boom! Studios, DC Comics	Crossover with the Green Lantern Corps.	
Planet of the Apes (comics)	War for the Planet of the Apes	4 issues	Limited series	July – October 2017	David Walker	Boom! Studios	Set between Dawn and War.	
Planet of the Apes (comics)	Kong on the Planet of the Apes	6 issues	Limited series	November 2017 – April 2018	Ryan Ferrier	Boom! Studios	Crossover with King Kong.	
Planet of the Apes (comics)	Planet of the Apes: Ursus	6 issues	Limited series	January – June 2018	David F. Walker	Boom! Studios		
Planet of the Apes (comics)	Planet of the Apes: Visionaries	1 volume	Graphic novel	August 2018	Rod Serling (screenplay), Dana Gould (adaptation)	Boom! Studios	Adaptation of the unproduced 1964–1965 screenplay for the 1968 film written by Rod Serling.	
Planet of the Apes (comics)	Planet of the Apes: The Time of Man	1 issue	One-shot	October 2018	David F. Walker, Dan Abnett, Phillip Kennedy Johnson	Boom! Studios		
Planet of the Apes (comics)	Planet of the Apes: The Simian Age	1 issue	One-shot	December 2018	Matt Kindt, Ryan Ferrier, Jeff Jensen	Boom! Studios		
Planet of the Apes (comics)	Planet of the Apes (2023)	5 issues	Limited series	June – October 2023	David F. Walker	Marvel Comics		
Planet of the Apes (comics)	Beware the Planet of the Apes	4 issues	Limited series	March – June 2023	Marc Guggenheim	Marvel Comics		
Planet of the Apes (comics)	Planet of the Apes versus Fantastic Four	4 issues	Limited series	April – July 2026	Josh Trujillo	Marvel Comics	Crossover with the Fantastic Four.	
Pocahontas (1995)	Disney's Pocahontas	2 issues	Limited series	June – July 1995	Bob Foster	Marvel Comics	Adaptation of the eponymous film.	
Pocahontas (1995)	Disney Comic Hits! #1, 3, 5, 7	4 issues	Main feature (#1, 3, 7), back-up feature (#5)	October 1995, December 1995, February 1996, April 1996	Barbara Slate	Marvel Comics	Four self-contained stories in four issues apart: "Colors in the Sky!" (#1), "Unsettling Spirits" (#3), "Holiday Harmony" (#5) and "Nature's Way (#7); the third was featured as a back-up feature in the holiday-themed fifth issue with Beauty and the Beast, Timon & Pumbaa and Toy Story.	No
Pokémon	Pokémon: Detective Pikachu – The Official Movie Adaptation	1 volume	Graphic novel	March 2020	Brian Buccellato	Legendary Comics	Adaptation of the eponymous film.	
Pollyanna (1960)	Walt Disney's Treasury of Classic Tales: Pollyanna	13 installlments	Newspaper strip	July 3 – September 25, 1960	Frank Reilly	King Features Syndicate	Adaptations of the eponymous film; the art for the strip version was drawn by Jesse Marsh while the art for the book version (33 pages total) was done by Nat Edson.	
Pollyanna (1960)	Four Color (series 2) #1129	1 issue	One-shot	August–October 1960	?	Dell Comics	Adaptations of the eponymous film; the art for the strip version was drawn by Jesse Marsh while the art for the book version (33 pages total) was done by Nat Edson.	No
Power Rangers	The Mighty Morphin' Power Rangers Movie Special	1 issue	One-shot	September 1995	Nel Yomtov	Marvel Comics	Adaptation of the non-canonical first film; an alternate photo comics adaptation of the same film was also published in that year.	No
Power Rangers	Power Rangers: Aftershock	1 volume	Graphic novel	March 2017	Ryan Parrott	Boom! Studios	Original story set in the continuity of the 2017 film.	
The Powerpuff Girls Movie	The Powerpuff Girls Movie — The Official Comic Book Adaptation!	1 issue	One-shot	July 2002	Amy Keating Rogers	DC Comics	Adaptation of the eponymous film.	No
Predator (list)	Predator (1989)	4 issues	Limited series	June 1989 – March 1990	Mark Verheiden	Dark Horse Comics	Later adapted into a novel Predator: Concrete Jungle (1995), by Nathan Archer.	
Predator (list)	Predator 2	2 issues	Limited series	February – June 1991	Franz Henkel	Dark Horse Comics	Adaptation of the second film.	
Predator (list)	Predator: Big Game	4 issues	Limited series	March – June 1991	John Arcudi	Dark Horse Comics		
Predator (list)	Predator: Cold War	4 issues	Limited series	September – December 1991	Mark Verheiden	Dark Horse Comics	Later adapted into a novel Predator: Cold War (1997), by Nathan Archer.	
Predator (list)	Batman Versus Predator	3 issues	Limited series	December 1991 – February 1992	Dave Gibbons	DC Comics, Dark Horse Comics	First crossover with Batman.	
Predator (list)	Predator: The Bloody Sands of Time	2 issues	Limited series	February 1992	Dan Barry	Dark Horse Comics		
Predator (list)	Predator versus Magnus, Robot Fighter	2 issues	Limited series	November – December 1992	Jim Shooter, John Ostrander	Dark Horse Comics, Valiant Comics	Crossover with Magnus, Robot Fighter.	
Predator (list)	Predator: Race War	5 issues	Limited series	February – October 1993	Andrew Vachss, Randy Stradley	Dark Horse Comics	A three-part story serving as the prologue to this limited series was published in Dark Horse Presents #67, 68 and 69 from November 1992 to February 1993, it was later collected and republished as issue 0 of the series, between 2 and 3, in April 1993.	
Predator (list)	Predator: Bad Blood	4 issues	Limited series	December 1993 – June 1994	Evan Dorkin	Dark Horse Comics		
Predator (list)	Predator: Invaders from the Fourth Dimension	1 issue	One-shot	July 1994	Jerry Prosser	Dark Horse Comics		
Predator (list)	Batman Versus Predator II: Bloodmatch	4 issues	Limited series	October 1994 – January 1995	Doug Moench	DC Comics, Dark Horse Comics	Second crossover with Batman.	
Predator (list)	Predator: Jungle Tales	1 issue	One-shot	March 1995	Ian Edginton, Rick Leonard, Dan Panosian	Dark Horse Comics		
Predator (list)	Tarzan vs. Predator: At the Earth's Core	4 issues	Limited series	January – June 1996	Walter Simonson	Dark Horse Comics	Crossover with Tarzan.	
Predator (list)	Predator: Dark River	4 issues	Limited series	July – October 1996	Mark Verheiden	Dark Horse Comics		
Predator (list)	Predator: Strange Roux	1 issue	One-shot	November 1996	Brian McDonald	Dark Horse Comics		
Predator (list)	Predator: Kindred	4 issues	Limited series	December 1996 – March 1997	Jason R. Lamb, Scott Tolson	Dark Horse Comics		
Predator (list)	Predator: Hell & Hot Water	3 issues	Limited series	April – June 1997	Mark Schultz	Dark Horse Comics		
Predator (list)	Predator: Primal	2 issues	Limited series	June – August 1997	Kevin J. Anderson	Dark Horse Comics		
Predator (list)	Predator vs. Judge Dredd	3 issues	Limited series	John Wagner	October – December 1997	Egmont, Dark Horse Comics	Crossover with Judge Dredd.	
Predator (list)	Batman Versus Predator III: Blood Ties	4 issues	Limited series	November 1997 – February 1998	DC Comics, Dark Horse Comics	Chuck Dixon	Third crossover with Batman.	
Predator (list)	Predator: Nemesis	2 issues	Limited series	December 1997 – January 1998	Gordon Rennie	Dark Horse Comics		
Predator (list)	Predator: Hell Come A-Walkin'	2 issues	Limited series	January – February 1998	Nancy A. Collins	Dark Horse Comics		
Predator (list)	Predator: Captive	1 issue	One-shot	April 1998	Gordon Rennie	Dark Horse Comics		
Predator (list)	Predator: Homeworld	4 issues	Limited series	March – June 1999	Jim Vance, Kate Worley	Dark Horse Comics		
Predator (list)	Predator: Xenogenesis	4 issues	Limited series	August – November 1999	Ian Edginton, Mel Rubi, Andrew Pepoy	Dark Horse Comics		
Predator (list)	Superman vs. Predator	3 issues	Limited series	May – July 2000	David Michelinie	DC Comics, Dark Horse Comics	Crossover with Superman.	
Predator (list)	JLA versus Predator	1 issue	One-shot	February 2001	John Ostrander	DC Comics, Dark Horse Comics	Crossover with the Justice League.	
Predator (list)	Predator (2009)	4 issues	Limited series	June 2009 – January 2010	John Arcudi	Dark Horse Comics		
Predator (list)	Predators: The Official Prequel	4 issues	Limited series	June — July 2010	Marc Andreyko, David Lapham	Dark Horse Comics	All three comics based on the third film; the first is a four issue prequel limited series set before the events of the film, the second is a single issue adaptation of the overall film and the third is a one-shot sequel story concerning the aftermath of the main plot.	
Predator (list)	Predators: The Official Adaptation	1 issue	One-shot	July 2010	Paul Tobin	Dark Horse Comics	All three comics based on the third film; the first is a four issue prequel limited series set before the events of the film, the second is a single issue adaptation of the overall film and the third is a one-shot sequel story concerning the aftermath of the main plot.	
Predator (list)	Predators: The Official Sequel	1 issue	One-shot	July 2010	David Lapham	Dark Horse Comics	All three comics based on the third film; the first is a four issue prequel limited series set before the events of the film, the second is a single issue adaptation of the overall film and the third is a one-shot sequel story concerning the aftermath of the main plot.	
Predator (list)	Predator: Fire and Stone	4 issues	Limited series	October 2014 – January 2015	Joshua Williamson	Dark Horse Comics	Part of the Fire and Stone crossover storyline with Alien, Alien vs. Predator and Prometheus.	
Predator (list)	Archie vs. Predator	4 issues	Limited series	April – July 2015	Alex De Campi	Dark Horse Comics, Archie Comics	First crossover with Archie.	Hardcover: (1-61655-805-9/978-1-61655-805-5); Paperback: (978-1-5067-1466-0)
Predator (list)	Predator: Life and Death	4 issues	Limited series	March – June 2016	Dan Abnett	Dark Horse Comics	Part of the Life and Death crossover storyline with Alien, Alien vs. Predator and Prometheus.	
Predator (list)	Archie vs. Predator II	5 issues	Limited series	July 2019 – January 2020	Alex De Campi	Dark Horse Comics, Archie Comics	Second crossover with Archie and sequel to the first crossover.	Paperback: 978-1-64576-983-5
Predator (list)	Predator: Hunters	5 issues	Limited series	May – August 2017	Chris Warner	Dark Horse Comics		
Predator (list)	Predator: Hunters II	4 issues	Limited series	August 2018 – January 2019	Chris Warner	Dark Horse Comics		
Predator (list)	Predator: Hunters III	4 issues	Limited series	February – May 2020	Chris Warner	Dark Horse Comics		
Predator (list)	Predator (2022)	6 issues	Limited series	October 2022 – March 2023	Ed Brisson	Marvel Comics		
Predator (list)	Predator (2023)	5 issues	Limited series	May – September 2023	Ed Brisson	Marvel Comics		
Predator (list)	Predator versus Wolverine	4 issues	Limited series	November 2023 – March 2024	Benjamin Percy	Marvel Comics	Crossover with Wolverine.	
Predator (list)	Predator: The Last Hunt	4 issues	Limited series	April – July 2024	Ed Brisson	Marvel Comics		
Predator (list)	Predator versus Black Panther	4 issues	Limited series	October 2024 – January 2025	Benjamin Percy	Marvel Comics	Crossover with Black Panther.	
Predator (list)	Predator versus Spider-Man	4 issues	Limited series	June – September 2025	Benjamin Percy	Marvel Comics	Crossover with Spider-Man.	
Predator (list)	Predator: Black, White & Blood	4 issues	Limited series	September – December 2025	Joe Kelly (#1–4), Eliot Rahal (#2), Sarah Gailey (#2), Steve Foxe (#3), Cody Ziglar (#4)	Marvel Comics		
The Pride and the Passion	Four Color (series 2) #824	1 issue	One-shot	August 1957	Paul S. Newman	Dell Comics	Adaptation of the eponymous film.	No
Prince of Persia: The Sands of Time	Prince of Persia: Before the Sandstorm	4 issues	Limited series	April 2010	Jordan Mechner	Dynamite Entertainment	Adaptation of the eponymous film.	Trade paperback (1-4231-2429-4/978-1-4231-2429-0)
Prince of Pirates	Movie Love #19	1 issue	One-shot	February 1953	?	Eastern Color Printing	Adaptation of the eponymous film.	No
Prince Valiant	Four Color (series 2) #567, #650	2 issues	Serial	June 1954, September 1955	Paul S. Newman	Dell Comics	The first part "Prince Valiant Comes to Camelot" is a straight adaptation of the film's plot, the second part "Hostage to Treachery" is a completely original story and is a sequel to the earlier issue.	No
Prometheus	Prometheus: Fire and Stone	4 issues	Limited series	September – December 2014	Paul Tobin	Dark Horse Comics	Both issues are part of the Fire and Stone crossover storyline with Alien, Predator and Alien vs. Predator.	
Prometheus	Prometheus: Fire and Stone – Omega	1 issue	One-shot	February 2015	Kelly Sue DeConnick	Dark Horse Comics	Both issues are part of the Fire and Stone crossover storyline with Alien, Predator and Alien vs. Predator.	
Prometheus	Prometheus: Life and Death	4 issues	Limited series	June – September 2016	Dan Abnett	Dark Horse Comics	Both issues are part of the Life and Death crossover storyline with Alien, Predator and Alien vs. Predator.	
Prometheus	Prometheus: Life and Death – Final Conflict	1 issue	One-shot	April 2017	Dan Abnett	Dark Horse Comics	Both issues are part of the Life and Death crossover storyline with Alien, Predator and Alien vs. Predator.	
Psycho	Alfred Hitchcock's Psycho	3 issues	Limited series	February – September 1992	Felipe Echevarria	Innovation Publishing	Based on the original 1960 film.	No
PT 109	PT 109	1 issue	One-shot	September 1964	?	Gold Key Comics	Adaptation of the eponymous film.	No
The Punisher	The Punisher Movie Special	1 issue	Graphic novel	June 1990	Carl Potts	Marvel Comics	Adaptation of the 1989 film.	No
The Punisher	The Punisher: Official Movie Adaptation	3 issues	Limited series	May 2004	Peter Milligan	Marvel Comics	Adaptation of the 2004 film.	
Puppet Master	Puppet Master — In Full Color!	4 issues	Limited series	December 1990 – May 1991	David M. de Vries	Eternity Comics		No
Puppet Master	Puppet Master: Children of the Puppet Master	2 issues	Limited series	August – September 1991	David M. de Vries	Eternity Comics		No
Push	Push	6 issues	Limited series	January – April 2009	Marc Bernardin, Adam Freeman	WildStorm		

== Q ==
Based on	Title	Length	Format	Publication date	Authors	Publisher	Notes	Collected editions
The Quatermass Xperiment	The House of Hammer #8—9	2 issues	One-shot	May – June 1977	Les Lilley, Ben Aldrich	Top Sellers Ltd.	Adaptation of the eponymous first film.	
Quatermass 2	The House of Hammer #23: "Enemy from Space (Quatermass II)"	1 issue	May 1978	Steve Parkhouse	Adaptation of the second film, under the alternate American title.	Top Sellers Ltd.		
Quebec	Movie Love #8	1 issue	One-shot	April 1951	?	Eastern Color Printing	Adaptation of the eponymous film.	No
Quest for Camelot	Quest for Camelot	1 issue	One-shot	July 1998	Jesse Leon McCann, Robert Graff	DC Comics	Adaptation of the eponymous film.	No

== R ==
Based on	Title	Length	Format	Publication date	Authors	Publisher	Notes	Collected editions
Race for Your Life, Charlie Brown	Race for Your Life, Charlie Brown	1 volume	Graphic novel	November 2018	Jason Cooper	Boom! Studios	Adaptation of the eponymous film, the fourth canonical feature in the Peanuts franchise.	Paperback: 978-1-68415-196-7
The Rage (2007)	Robert Kurtzman's Beneath the Valley of the Rage	3 issues	Limited series	June – August 2007	Robert Kurtzman, John Bisson	Fangoria Comics	Prequel to the film.	No
Rainbow Brite and the Star Stealer	Rainbow Brite and the Star Stealer	1 issue	One-shot	March 1986	Bob Rozakis	DC Comics	Adaptation of the eponymous film.	No
Rambo	Rambo III	1 issue	One-shot	September 1988	Bruce Jones	Blackthorne Publishing	Adaptation of the third film in the series; also published as Blackthorne 3-D Series #49 in a stereoscopy special edition.	No
Rambo	Rambo (1988)	1 issue	One-shot	October 1988	Ron Fortier	Blackthorne Publishing	Original story based on the overall series.	No
The Raven (1963)	Dell Movie Classics #12-680-309	1 issue	One-shot	September 1963	Don Segall	Dell Comics	Adaptation of the 1963 film based on the poem by Edgar Allan Poe.	No
Re-Animator	Re-Animator (1991)	3 issues	Limited series	October 1991 – April 1992		Adventure Publications		No
Re-Animator	Re-Animator: Dawn of the Re-Animator!	4 issues	Limited series		March – June 1992	Adventure Publications	Prequel to the film.	No
Re-Animator	Army of Darkness vs. Re-Animator	4 issues	Limited series	October 2005 – February 2006	James Kuhoric	Dynamite Entertainment	First crossover with Army of Darkness.	Paperback: 1-933305-13-4 / 978-1-933305-13-4
Re-Animator	Army of Darkness/Reanimator	1 issue	One-shot	October 2013	Mark Rahner	Dynamite Entertainment	Second crossover with Army of Darkness.	
Re-Animator	Re-Animator (2015)	4 issues	Limited series	April – July 2015	Keith Davidsen	Dynamite Entertainment		
Re-Animator	Vampirella vs. Re-Animator	4 issues	Limited series	December 2018 – April 2019	Cullen Bunn	Dynamite Entertainment	Crossover with Vampirella.	
Re-Animator	The Army of Darkness versus Reanimator: Necronomicon Rising	5 issues	Limited series	July – November 2022	Erik Burnham	Dynamite Entertainment	Third crossover with Army of Darkness.	Paperback: 1-5241-2308-0 / 978-1-5241-2308-6
The Real Glory	Movie Comics #6	1 issue	Photo comics	?	DC Comics	October 1939	Condensed adaptation of the eponymous film.	No
The Red Badge of Courage	Motion Picture Comics #105	1 issue	One-shot	July 1951	Leo Dorfman	Fawcett Comics	Adaptation of the 1951 film version based on the novel by Stephen Crane.	No
Red Heat (1988)	Red Heat	1 issue	One-shot	July 1988	John Stephenson	Blackthorne Publishing	Adaptation of the eponymous film; also published as Blackthorne 3-D Series #45 in a stereoscopy special edition.	No
Red Sonja	Red Sonja	2 issues	Limited series	November – December 1985	Louise Simonson, Mary Wilshire	Marvel Comics	First published as Marvel Comics Super Special #38 in November 1985.	No
The Redhead and the Cowboy	Movie Love #9	1 issue	One-shot	June 1951	?	Eastern Color Printing	Adaptation of the eponymous film.	No
The Reluctant Dragon (1941 film)	Four Color (series 1) #13: "Reluctant Dragon"	1 issue	One-shot	1941	?	Dell Comics	Adaptation of the eponymous film, adapting all three respective segments of the film, The Reluctant Dragon, Baby Weems and How to Ride a Horse, into comic strip format, plus an adaptation of the Donald Duck short Old MacDonald Duck (1941) and a prose story adaptation of The Sorcerer's Apprentice from Fantasia (1940).	No
The Reptile	Hammer's House of Horror #19	1 issue	One-shot	February 1978	Steve Moore	Top Sellers Ltd.	Adaptation of the eponymous film.	No
Reptilicus	Reptilicus	2 issues	Limited series	August – October 1961	Joe Gill	Charlton Comics	The first issue is an adaptation of the eponymous film, the second issue, "In the African Jungle", is a sequel story.	
The Rescuers	Walt Disney's Treasury of Classic Tales: The Rescuers	13 installments	Newspaper strip	March 6 – May 29, 1977	Carl Fallberg	King Features Syndicate	Adaptations of the eponymous first film; the artwork for the strip version was drawn by Richard Moore while the art for the book version was done by Pete Alvarado.	No
The Rescuers	Walt Disney Showcase #40	1 issue	One-shot	September 1977	Carl Fallberg	Gold Key Comics	Adaptations of the eponymous first film; the artwork for the strip version was drawn by Richard Moore while the art for the book version was done by Pete Alvarado.	No
The Rescuers	Walt Disney's Treasury of Classic Tales: The Return of the Rescuers	13 installments	Newspaper strip	October 2 – December 25, 1983	Tom Yakutis	King Features Syndicate	Original story; art by Richard Moore.	No
The Rescuers	The Rescuers Down Under	1 volume	Graphic novel	1990	William Rotsler	W. D. Publications, Inc.	Adaptation of the eponymous second film.	
Return of the Living Dead	Return of the Living Dead	4 issues	Limited series	December 2024 – May 2025	S.A. Check, James Kuhoric	American Mythology Productions		
Return to Oz	Walt Disney's Treasury of Classic Tales: Return to Oz	15 installments	Newspaper strip	April 7 – July 14, 1985	Carl Fallberg	King Features Syndicate	Adaptations of the eponymous film; the art for the strip version was done by Richard Moore.	No
Return to Oz	Walt Disney Pictures' Return to Oz	1 volume	Graphic novel	1985	?	Scholastic Book Services	Adaptations of the eponymous film; the art for the strip version was done by Richard Moore.	Paperback: 0-590-33747-5/978-0-590-33747-2
Ri¢hie Ri¢h	Ri¢hie Ri¢h	1 issue	One-shot	February 1995	Angelo DeCesare	Marvel Comics	Adaptation of the eponymous film.	No
Ring of Bright Water	Dell Movie Classics #01-701-910	1 issue	One-shot	October 1969	?	Dell Comics	Adaptation of the eponymous film.	No
Rio Bravo	Four Color (series 2) #1018	1 issues	One-shot	May–July 1959	Eric Freiwald, Robert Schaefer	Dell Comics	Adaptation of the eponymous film.	No
Rio Conchos	Rio Conchos	1 issue	One-shot	March 1965	Paul S. Newman	Gold Key Comics	Adaptation of the eponymous film.	No
Rob Roy: The Highland Rogue	Walt Disney's Treasury of Classic Tales: Rob Roy	22 installments	Newspaper strip	January 3 – May 30, 1954	Frank Reilly	King Features Syndicate	Adaptations of the eponymous film; the art for the strip was done by Jesse Marsh while the art for the book was drawn by Russ Manning.	
Rob Roy: The Highland Rogue	Four Color (series 2) #544: "Rob Roy"	1 issue	One-shot	March 1954	Elizabeth Beecher	Dell Comics	Adaptations of the eponymous film; the art for the strip was done by Jesse Marsh while the art for the book was drawn by Russ Manning.	No
Robin Hood (1973)	Walt Disney's Treasury of Classic Tales: Robin Hood	17 installments	Newspaper strip	October 7, 1973 – January 27, 1974	Frank Reilly	King Features Syndicate	Adaptation of the eponymous film; art by Mike Arens.	No
Robin Hood (1973)	The Adventures of Robin Hood	7 issues	Ongoing series	March 1974 – January 1975		Gold Key Comics	Based on the 1973 Disney film.	No
Robin Hood (1973)	Walt Disney's Treasury of Classic Tales: Robin Hood in Rich John, Poor John	17 installments	Newspaper strip	April 1 – June 24, 1984	Tom Yakutis	King Features Syndicate	Original story; art by Richard Moore.	No
RoboCop (comics)	RoboCop (1987)	1 issue	Magazine, one-shot	October 1987	Bob Harras	Marvel Comics	Adaptation of the 1987 film.	
RoboCop (comics)	RoboCop (1990)	23 issues	Ongoing series	March 1990 – January 1992	Alan Grant (#1–10), Stephen Rupinski (#11), Evan Skolnick (#11), Simon Furman (#12–23)	Marvel Comics		
RoboCop (comics)	RoboCop 2	3 issues	Limited series	August – September 1990	Alan Grant	Marvel Comics	Adaptation of the second film; first published in its entirely in magazine format in August 1990.	
RoboCop (comics)	RoboCop Versus The Terminator	4 issues	Limited series	September – December 1992	Frank Miller	Dark Horse Comics	First crossover with Terminator.	RoboCop Versus The Terminator TPB
RoboCop (comics)	RoboCop: Prime Suspect	4 issues	October 1992 – January 1993	Limited series	John Arcudi	Dark Horse Comics		
RoboCop (comics)	RoboCop 3	3 issues	July – November 1993	Limited series	Steven Grant	Dark Horse Comics	Adaptation of the third film.	
RoboCop (comics)	RoboCop: Mortal Coils	4 issues	September – December 1993	Limited series	Steven Grant	Dark Horse Comics		
RoboCop (comics)	RoboCop: Roulette	4 issues	December 1993 – March 1994	Limited series	John Arcudi	Dark Horse Comics		
RoboCop (comics)	Frank Miller's RoboCop	9 issues	Limited series	July 2003 – January 2006	Frank Miller (screenplay), Steven Grant (writer)	Avatar Press	Adapted by Grant from Miller's unproduced RoboCop 2 screenplay and notes of unused ideas for RoboCop 3.	Frank Miller – RoboCop TPB
RoboCop (comics)	RoboCop: Killing Machine	1 issue	One-shot	August 2004	Steven Grant	Avatar Press		
RoboCop (comics)	RoboCop: Wild Child	1 issue	One-shot	January 2005	Steven Grant	Avatar Press		
RoboCop (comics)	RoboCop (2010)	6 issues	Ongoing series	January – August 2010	Rob Williams	Dynamite Entertainment	Alternate sequel story ignoring the events of RoboCop 2 and 3.	RoboCop: Revolution TPB
RoboCop (comics)	RoboCop: Road Trip	4 issues	Limited series	January – March 2012	Rob Williams	Dynamite Entertainment	Follow-up to the 2010 series.	
RoboCop (comics)	RoboCop: Last Stand	8 issues	Limited series	August 2013 – March 2014	Frank Miller (screenplay), Steven Grant (writer)	Boom! Studios	Adapted by Grant from Miller's unproduced RoboCop 3 screenplay.	
RoboCop (comics)	RoboCop: Beta	1 issue	One-shot	February 2014	Ed Brisson	Boom! Studios	Based on the 2014 film.	RoboCop: The Human Element TPB
RoboCop (comics)	RoboCop: Hominem Ex Machina	1 issue	One-shot	February 2014	Michael Moreci	Boom! Studios	Based on the 2014 film.	RoboCop: The Human Element TPB
RoboCop (comics)	RoboCop: Memento Mori	1 issue	One-shot	February 2014	Frank J. Barbiere	Boom! Studios	Based on the 2014 film.	RoboCop: The Human Element TPB
RoboCop (comics)	RoboCop: To Live and Die in Detroit	1 issue	One-shot	February 2014	Joe Harris	Boom! Studios	Based on the 2014 film.	RoboCop: The Human Element TPB
RoboCop (comics)	RoboCop (2014)	12 issues	Ongoing series	July 2014 – June 2015	Joshua Williamson, Dennis Culver (#9–12)	Boom! Studios		
RoboCop (comics)	RoboCop: Citizens Arrest	5 issues	Limited series	April – August 2018	Brian Wood	Boom! Studios	Follow-up to the 2014 series.	
Robotech: The Movie	Robotech: The Movie	2 issues	Limited series	November 1996	Benny R. Powell, Carl Macek (original story)	Academy Comics	Adaptation of the eponymous film.	No
Rock 'n' Roll High School	Rock & Roll High School	2 issues	Ongoing series	October – November 1995	Bob Fingerman, James Kochalka	Roger Corman's Cosmic Comics		No
Rock & Rule	Marvel Comics Super Special #25	1 issue	Magazine, one-shot	August 1983	Bob Budiansky, Clive A. Smith, Bill Mantlo	Marvel Comics	Adaptation of the eponymous film.	No
The Rocketeer	The Rocketeer: The Official Movie Adaptation	1 issue	Graphic novel	May 1991	Peter David	W. D. Publications, Inc.	Adaptation of the eponymous film; 64 pages total, art by Russ Heath.	
The Rocketeer	The Rocketeer 3-D Comic	1 issue	Book-and-record set	June 1991	Ron Kidd	Disney Audio Entertainment	Alternate adaptation of the same film, printed in black and white and published in anaglyph 3-D; the book was packaged with stereoscopic glasses and an audio drama cassette tape accompanying the story (narrated by Chuck Riley); 52 pages total, art by Neal Adams.	No
The Rocky Horror Picture Show	The Rocky Horror Picture Show: The Comic Book	3 issues	Limited series	July 1990 – January 1991	Kevin VanHook	Caliber Comics	Adaptation of the eponymous film; art by VanHook.	The Rocky Horror Picture Show: The Comic Book Compilation TP (0-9857493-1-8/978-0-9857493-1-6)
Rocky Lane	Powder River Rustlers	1 issue	One-shot	1950	Joe Millard	Fawcett Comics	Adaptation of the seventeenth film in the series.	No
Rocky Lane	Fawcett Movie Comic #7: "Gunmen of Abilene"	1 issue	One-shot	February 1950	Otto Binder	Fawcett Comics	Adaptation of the eighteenth film in the series.	No
Rocky Lane	Motion Picture Comics #102: "Code of the Silver Sage"	4 issues	One-shot	Leo Dorfman	January 1951	Fawcett Comics	Adaptation of the nineteenth film in the series.	No
Rocky Lane	Motion Picture Comics #103: "Covered Wagon Raid"	4 issues	One-shot	Leo Dorfman	March 1951	Fawcett Comics	Adaptation of the twenty-first film in the series.	No
Rocky Lane	Motion Picture Comics #104: "Vigilante Hideout"	4 issues	One-shot	Leo Dorfman	May 1951	Fawcett Comics	Adaptation of the twenty-second film in the series.	No
Rocky Lane	Motion Picture Comics #107: "Frisco Tornado"	4 issues	One-shot	Leo Dorfman	November 1951	Fawcett Comics	Adaptation of the twenty-third film in the series.	No
Rocky Lane	Fawcett Movie Comic #12: "Rustlers on Horseback"	1 issue	One-shot	Leo Dorfman	August 1951	Fawcett Comics	Adaptation of the twenty-fourth film in the series.	No
Rocky Lane	Motion Picture Comics #109: "Rough Riders of Durango"	1 issue	One-shot	Leo Dorfman	March 1952	Fawcett Comics	Adaptation of the twenty-sixth film in the series.	No
Rose of Cimarron	Fawcett Movie Comic #17	1 issue	One-shot	June 1952	Leo Dorfman	Fawcett Comics	Adaptation of the eponymous film.	No
The Runaway (1961)	Dell Movie Classics #12-707-412	1 issue	One-shot	October–December 1964	?	Dell Comics	Adaptation of the eponymous film directed by Claudio Guzmán and starring Cesar Romero; 32 pages total, art by Tom Gill.	No

== S ==
Based on	Title	Length	Format	Publication date	Authors	Publisher	Notes	Collected editions
The Saint Strikes Back	Movie Comics #2	1 issue	Photo comics	May 1939	?	Fawcett Comics	Condensed adaptation of the eponymous film, the second film in The Saint film series.	No
Sand (1949)	Sun #???–???	11 issues	Serial	4 March 1950 – 13 May 1950	?	Amalgamated Press	Adaptation of the eponymous film.	No
Santa Claus Conquers the Martians	Dell Movie Classics #12-725-603	1 issue	One-shot	March 1966	?	Dell Comics	Adaptation of the eponymous film.	No
Santa Claus: The Movie	Marvel Comics Super Special #39	1 issue	Magazine	March 1986	Sid Jacobson	Marvel Comics	Adaptation of the eponymous film.	No
Santiago	Four Color (series 2) #723	1 issue	One-shot	September 1956	?	Dell Comics	Adaptation of the eponymous film.	No
Savage Sam	Walt Disney's Treasury of Classic Tales: Savage Sam	13 installments	Newspaper strip	July 7 – September 29, 1963	Frank Reilly	King Features Syndicate	Adaptations of the eponymous film, the sequel to Old Yeller (1957); the artwork for the strip version was done by John Ushler.	
Savage Sam	Walt Disney's World of Adventure #3	1 issue	One-shot	October 1963	?	Gold Key Comics	Adaptations of the eponymous film, the sequel to Old Yeller (1957); the artwork for the strip version was done by John Ushler.	No
Saw	Saw: Rebirth	1 issue	One-shot	October 2005	Kris Oprisko	IDW Publishing		No
Scarface	Scarface: Scarred for Life	5 issues	Limited series	December 2006 – April 2007	John Layman	IDW Publishing		Paperback: 1-60010-087-2/978-1-60010-087-1
Scarface	Scarface: Devil in Disguise	5 issues	Limited series	July – October 2007	Joshua Jabcuga	IDW Publishing		Paperback: 1-60010-153-4/978-1-60010-153-3
The Scorpion King	The Scorpion King	2 issues	Limited series	Scott Allie	Dark Horse Comics	March – April 2002		No
Scouts to the Rescue	Movie Comics #1–2	2 issues	Photo comics, serial	?	DC Comics	April – May 1939	Condensed adaptation of the eponymous serial film.	No
Scrooge McDuck and Money	Walt Disney Uncle Scrooge and Money	1 issue	One-shot	?	Gold Key Comics	March 1967	Adaptation of the eponymous film, 14 pages total, followed by a back-up reprint of the Carl Barks Donald Duck story "The Trouble with Dimes" (10 pages) from Walt Disney's Comics and Stories #130 (July 1951).	No
Scum of the Earth!	Scum of the Earth!	3 issues	Limited series	September – November 1991	Daniel Wilson	Aircel Comics		No
The Searchers	Four Color (series 2) #709	1 issue	One-shot	June 1956	Leo Dorfman	Dell Comics	Adaptation of the eponymous film.	No
The Secret Life of Pets	The Secret Life of Pets	2 issues	Limited series	June – July 2019	Stephane Lapuss	Titan Comics	Anthology based on the film series overall.	
The Secret of NIMH	The Secret of NIMH	1 volume	Graphic novel	1982	?	Western Publishing	Adaptation of the eponymous film based on the 1971 novel Mrs. Frisby and the Rats of NIMH by Robert C. O'Brien.	Paperback: 0-307-11293-4
The Secret of the Sword	He-Man and She-Ra in The Secret of the Sword	1 issue	Minicomic	September 1985	?	Mattel	Adaptation of the eponymous film; six pages total, originally published by Mattel as a part of their sweepstakes on the overall film and given away at movie theaters prior to the release of the film.	No
September Affair	Movie Love #5	1 issue	One-shot	October 1950	?	Eastern Color Printing	Adaptation of the eponymous film.	No
Serenity (2005)	Serenity: Those Left Behind	3 issues	Limited series	July – September 2005	Joss Whedon, Brett Matthews	Dark Horse Comics		Hardcover (first edition) (1-59307-846-3/978-1-59307-846-1); Hardcover (second edition) (1-59582-914-8/978-1-59582-914-6); Trade paperback (1-59307-449-2/978-1-59307-449-4)
Serenity (2005)	Serenity: Better Days	3 issues	Limited series	March – May 2008	Joss Whedon, Brett Matthews	Dark Horse Comics		Paperback: 1-59582-162-7/978-1-59582-162-1
Seven	Seven	7 issues	Limited series	September 2006 – October 2007	Raven Gregory, Mike Kalvoda, Ralph Tedesco, Joe Brusha, Christian Beranek, Adam Beranek, David Wohl, David Mack	Zenescope Entertainment	Continuation of the eponymous film.	No
Sgt. Pepper's Lonely Hearts Club Band	Marvel Comics Super Special #7	1 issue	Magazine	January 1979	David Anthony Kraft	Marvel Comics	Adaptation of the eponymous film; this issue was withdrawn after completion, and never published in English, it was however translated and published in French and Dutch editions.	No
The Shadow	The Shadow	2 issues	Limited series	June – July 1994	Joel Goss, Michael Wm. Kaluta	Dark Horse Comics	Adaptation of the 1994 film based on the eponymous character created by Walter B. Gibson.	
Shadow of the Vampire	Shadow of the Vampire	1 issue	One-shot	2000		Lions Gate Entertainment, Creation Entertainment	Adaptation of the eponymous film; 12 pages long in black and white outline.	No
The Shaggy Dog	Walt Disney's Treasury of Classic Tales: The Shaggy Dog	17 installments	Newspaper strip	January 4 – April 26, 1959	Frank Reilly	King Features Syndicate	Adaptations of the eponymous 1959 film; the artwork for the strip version was done by Jesse Marsh, while the artwork for the book version (32 pages total) was done by Dan Spiegle.	No
The Shaggy Dog	Four Color (series 2) #985	1 issue	One-shot	May 1959	Eric Freiwald, Robert Schaefer	Dell Comics	Adaptations of the eponymous 1959 film; the artwork for the strip version was done by Jesse Marsh, while the artwork for the book version (32 pages total) was done by Dan Spiegle.	No
The Shaggy Dog	Walt Disney's Treasury of Classic Tales: The Shaggy D.A.	13 installments	Newspaper strip	September 5 – November 28, 1976	Carl Fallberg	King Features Syndicate	Adaptation of the eponymous sequel film; the artwork was done by Richard Moore.	No
The Sharkfighters	Four Color (series 2) #762	1 issue	One-shot	January 1957	Leo Dorfman	Dell Comics	Adaptation of the eponymous film.	No
Sharknado	Archie vs. Sharknado	1 issue	One-shot	July 2015	Anthony C. Ferrante, Dan Parent	Archie Comics	Crossover with Archie.	No
Shaun of the Dead	Shaun of the Dead	4 issues	Limited series	June –August 2005	Chris Ryall	IDW Publishing	Continuation based on the eponymous film.	
She-Devils on Wheels	She-Devils on Wheels	3 issues	Limited series	June – August 1992	Roland Mann	Aircel Comics		No
Sheena	Sheena	2 issues	Limited series	December 1984 – February 1985	Cary Burkett	Marvel Comics	Adaptation of the eponymous film based on the comic book character created by Will Eisner and Jerry Iger; first published as Marvel Comics Super Special #34 in November 1984.	No
She Wore a Yellow Ribbon	Sun #???–???	7 issues	Serial	20 May 1950 – 1 July 1950	?	Amalgamated Press	Adaptation of the eponymous film.	No
Shipwrecked	Shipwrecked!	1 volume	Graphic novel	January 1991	William Rotsler	W. D. Publications Inc.	Adaptation of the eponymous film.	
Shrek	Shrek (2003)	3 issues	Limited series	September – October 2003	Mark Evanier	Dark Horse Comics		
Shrek	Shrek (2010)	4 issues	Limited series	September 2010 – April 2011	Arie Kaplan, Scott Shaw!, Jesse McCann, Troy Dye, Tom Kelesides	Ape Entertainment		
Shrek	Shrek (2016)	4 issues	Limited series	June – October 2016	Patrick Storck	Joe Books Ltd.		
Sinbad the Sailor (1947)	Knock-Out Comic ???–???	12 issues	Serial	27 September 1947 – 13 December 1947	?	Amalgamated Press	Adaptation of the eponymous film.	No
Singin' in the Rain	Movie Love #14	1 issue	One-shot	April 1952	?	Eastern Color Printing	Adaptation of the eponymous film.	No
Singing Guns	Singing Guns	1 issue	One-shot	1950	Joe Millard	Fawcett Comics	Adaptation of the eponymous film.	No
Siren of Bagdad	Movie Love #21	1 issue	One-shot	June 1953	?	Eastern Color Printing	Adaptation of the eponymous film.	No
Six Black Horses	Dell Movie Classics #12-750-301: "6 Black Horses"	1 issue	One-shot	January 1963	?	Dell Comics	Adaptation of the eponymous film.	No
Ski Party	Dell Movie Classics #12-743-511	1 issue	One-shot	September–November 1965	?	Dell Comics	Adaptation of the eponymous film.	No
Slave Girl (1947)	Movie Comics #4	1 issue	One-shot	1947	John Graham	Fiction House	Adaptation of the eponymous film.	No
Sleeping Beauty (1959)	Walt Disney's Treasury of Classic Tales: Sleeping Beauty	22 installments	Newspaper strip	August 3 – December 28, 1958	Frank Reilly	King Features Syndicate	Adaptations of the eponymous film; the strip version was published five months before the official release of the film. The book version of the same story (75 pages total) was followed up by an original story "The Prince and the Princess in The Magic Wand Mystery" (12 pages total), eight activity pages ad a one-page illustration; the book was part of the Dell Giant comic book line. The artwork for the strip version was done by Julius Svedsen, while the artwork for the book version was done by Al Hubbard.	
Sleeping Beauty (1959)	Walt Disney's Sleeping Beauty	1 issue	One-shot	April 1959	?	Dell Comics		No
Sleeping Beauty (1959)	Four Color (series 2) #973: "Sleeping Beauty and the Prince"	2 issues	One-shot	May 1959	?	Dell Comics	The main feature story (32 pages total), plus a text article "The Artistry of Sleeping Beauty from Pencil to Film", an activity page "Saddle the Prince's White Charger" and a one-page illustration.	No
Sleeping Beauty (1959)	Four Color (series 2) #984: "Sleeping Beauty's Fairy Godmothers"	2 issues	One-shot	April 1959	Joe Rinaldi, Carl Fallberg	Dell Comics	The comic features three main stories concerning the Three Good Fairies, "Good Deed Day" (10 pages), "To the Rescue" (12 pages) and "The Pilfered Pastry" (10 pages), plus a two-page prose story adaptation of the overall film at the beginning "The Story of Sleeping Beauty" and a one-page activity "Flora's Fudge".	No
Sleeping Beauty (1959)	Walt Disney's Treasury of Classic Tales: The Search for Sleeping Beauty	13 installments	Newspaper strip	February 2 – April 27, 1986	Carl Fallberg	King Features Syndicate	Original story; the artwork was done by Richard Moore.	No
Sleeping Beauty (1959)	Disney Villains: Maleficent	5 issues	Limited series	May – October 2023	Soo Lee	Dynamite Entertainment	Second installment of Dynamite's Disney Villains comic line.	
Sleepy Hollow	Sleepy Hollow	1 issue	One-shot	January 2000	Steven T. Seagle	Vertigo	Adaptation of the eponymous film.	No
The Small One	Walt Disney Showcase #48	1 issue	One-shot	January 1979	Don R. Christensen	Gold Key Comics	Adaptation of the eponymous film.	No
Smith!	Walt Disney's Treasury of Classic Tales: Smith!	8 installments	Newspaper strip	January 5 – February 23, 1969	Frank Reilly	King Features Syndicate	Adaptation of the eponymous film; the artwork was done by John Ushler.	No
Smoky	Dell Movie Classics #12-746-702	1 issue	One-shot	February 1967	?	Dell Comics	Adaptation of the eponymous film.	No
Snakes on a Plane	Snakes on a Plane	2 issues	Limited series	October – November 2006	Chuck Dixon	WildStorm	Adaptation of the eponymous film.	No
Snow White and the Seven Dwarfs (1937)	Silly Symphony: "Snow White and the Seven Dwarfs by Walt Disney"	20 installments	Newspaper strip	December 12, 1937 – April 24, 1938	Merrill De Maris	King Features Syndicate	First adaptation of the film overall.	Silly Symphonies: The Complete Disney Classics Vol. 2: 1-63140-804-6/978-1-63140-804-5
Snow White and the Seven Dwarfs (1937)	Four Color (series 2) #19: "Thumper Meets the Seven Dwarfs"	1 issue	One-shot	1943	Carl Buettner	Dell Comics	Crossover story featuring Thumper the rabbit from Bambi (1942); 64 pages total, plus a profile of the eponymous rabbit and two one-page illustrations.	
Snow White and the Seven Dwarfs (1937)	Walt Disney's Comics and Stories #43: "Donald Duck and the Seven Dwarfs"	1 issue	Back-up feature	April 1944	?	Dell Comics	Crossover story featuring Donald Duck; three pages total.	No
Snow White and the Seven Dwarfs (1937)	Walt Disney's Comics and Stories #45: "The Seven Dwarfs and Thumper"	1 issue	Back-up feature	June 1944	Roger Armstrong, Carl Buettner	Dell Comics		No
Snow White and the Seven Dwarfs (1937)	Four Color (series 2) #49: "The Seven Dwarfs and Dumbo"	1 issue	Main feature	July 1944	Carl Buettner	Dell Comics		No
Snow White and the Seven Dwarfs (1937)	Walt Disney's Comics and Stories #49, #55: "The Seven Dwarfs and Dumbo"	2 issues	Back-up feature	October 1944, April 1945		Dell Comics		No
Snow White and the Seven Dwarfs (1937)	Walt Disney's Comics and Stories #47: "The Seven Dwarfs and the Wicked Witch"	1 issue	Back-up feature	August 1944		Dell Comics		No
Snow White and the Seven Dwarfs (1937)	Cheerios Set Z #3: "The Seven Dwarfs and the Enchanted Mountain"	1 issue	Minicomic	1947	Chase Craig	Western Publishing	Cheerios cereal premium.	No
Snow White and the Seven Dwarfs (1937)	Four Color (series 2) #227: "Walt Disney's Seven Dwarfs"	1 issue	One-shot	May 1949	Chase Craig, Roger Armstrong	Dell Comics	The comic features two self-contained stories featuring the eponymous characters, "The Seven Dwarfs and the Pirate" (25 pages) and "The Seven Dwarfs and Humpty Dumpty" (7 pages) respectively, plus three one-page gag strips featuring Bashful, Sleepy and Dopey.	
Snow White and the Seven Dwarfs (1937)	A New Adventure of Walt Disney's Snow White and the Seven Dwarfs	1 issue	Minicomic	1952	?	Western Publishing	Giveaway promo for Bendix Corporation.	No
Snow White and the Seven Dwarfs (1937)	Walt Disney's Snow White and the Seven Dwarfs in "The Milky Way"	1 issue	Minicomic	1955	?	Western Publishing	American Dairy Association premium.	No
Snow White and the Seven Dwarfs (1937)	Walt Disney's Snow White and the Seven Dwarfs in "Mystery of the Missing Magic"	1 issue	Minicomic	1958	Carl Fallberg	Western Publishing	Disney comic premium given away at Sav-on Drug stores, Eavey Grocers, Food Fair supermarkets and Safeway stores.	No
Snow White and the Seven Dwarfs (1937)	Walt Disney's Treasury of Classic Tales: The Seven Dwarfs and the Witch Queen	9 installments	Newspaper strip	March 2 – April 27, 1958	Frank Reilly	King Features Syndicate	Original story; the artwork was done by Julius Svedsen.	
Snow White and the Seven Dwarfs (1937)	Walt Disney's Treasury of Classic Tales: Snow White and the Seven Dwarfs	16 installments	Newspaper strip	March 13 – June 26, 1983	Carl Fallberg	King Features Syndicate	Re-adaptation of the eponymous film; the artwork for this version was done by Richard Moore.	
Snow White and the Seven Dwarfs (1937)	Disney Snow White and the Seven Dwarfs (2019)	3 issues	Limited series	June – August 2019	Cecil Castellucci	Dark Horse Comics	Re-adaptation with new script and artwork illustrated by Gabriele Bagnoli.	
Snowball Express	Walt Disney's Treasury of Classic Tales: Snowball Express	14 installments	Newspaper strip	Frank Reilly	King Features Syndicate	October 1 – December 31, 1972	Adaptation of the eponymous film; the artwork was done by John Ushler.	No
Solomon and Sheba	Four Color (series 2) #1070	1 issue	One-shot	December 1959-February 1960	Gaylord DuBois	Dell Comics	Adaptation of the eponymous film.	No
Song of the South	Uncle Remus and His Tales of Br'er Rabbit		Newspaper strip	October 14, 1945 – December 31, 1972	Bill Walsh, George Stallings, Jack Boyd	King Features Syndicate		
Song of the South	Four Color (series 2) #129: "Uncle Remus and His Tales of Br'er Rabbit"	1 issue	One-shot	December 1946	Chase Craig	Dell Comics	The two main feature stories, "Br'er Rabbit an' De Tar-Baby" (12 pages) and "Br'er Rabbit's Laffin' Place" (10 pages), are faithfully adapted from the film's cartoon sequences, the three stories in between, "Br'er Terrapin's Tug-o'-War" (8 pages), "Br'er Fox an' de Stolen Goobers" (12 pages) and "Br'er Rabbit Visits De Witch" (8 pages), are all original stories, plus an introductory page at the beginning of the book.	No
Song of the South	Br'er Rabbit Outwits Br'er Fox	1 issue	Minicomic	1947		Western Publishing	Cheerios cereal premiums.	No
Song of the South	Br'er Rabbit's Secret	1 issue	Minicomic	1947	Chase Craig	Western Publishing	Cheerios cereal premiums.	No
Song of the South	Four Color (series 2) #208: "Br'er Rabbit Does It Again!"	1 issue	January 1949	Minicomic	Chase Craig	Dell Comics	The main feature story (12 pages), plus three further stories, "Br'er Rabbit and th' Butter Business" (6 pages), "Gizzards for the 'Gator" (7 pages) and "Br'er Rabbit Fixes Up a Friendship" (7 pages), and two one-page gag strips featuring Br'ers Rabbit and Bear respectively.	No
Song of the South	Wheaties Set D #4: "Br'er Rabbit's Sunken Treasure"	1 issue	Minicomic	1951	?	Western Publishing	Wheaties cereal premium.	No
Song of the South	Brer Rabbit in "A Kite Tail"	1 issue	Minicomic	1955	?	Western Publishing	Reddy Kilowatt, Inc. premium.	No
Song of the South	Brer Rabbit in "Ice Cream for the Party"	1 issue	Minicomic	1955	?	Western Publishing	American Dairy Association premium.	No
Song of the South	Walt Disney's Treasury of Classic Tales: Song of the South	16 installments	Newspaper strip	August 3 – November 16, 1986	Carl Fallberg	King Features Syndicate	Adaptation of the eponymous film; the artwork was done by Richard Moore.	No
Sonic the Hedgehog 2	Sonic the Hedgehog 2: The Official Movie Pre-Quill	1 issue	One-shot	March 2022	Kiel Phegley	IDW Publishing	Prequel to the second film based on the Sega video game series.	
The Sons of Katie Elder	Dell Movie Classics #12-748-511	1 issue	One-shot	September–November 1965	?	Dell Comics	Adaptation of the eponymous film.	No
Southland Tales	Southland Tales Vols. 1–3	3 volumes	Graphic novels	Richard Kelly	Graphitti Designs	May – July 2006	All three volumes in the series individually titled in order: Two Roads Diverge (May 2006), Fingerprints (June 2006) and The Mechanicals (July 2006).	Southland Tales: The Prequel Saga: 0-936211-80-6/978-0-936211-80-0
Space Odyssey	Marvel Treasury Special 1976: "2001: A Space Odyssey"	1 issue	Magazine	June 22, 1976	Jack Kirby	Marvel Comics	Adaptation of the eponymous first film.	
Space Odyssey	2001: A Space Odyssey	10 issues	Ongoing series	December 1976 – September 1977	Jack Kirby	Marvel Comics		
Space Odyssey	2010	2 issues	Limited series	April – May 1985	J. M. DeMatteis	Marvel Comics	Adaptation of the sequel film; first published in its complete form as Marvel Comics Super Special #37 (April 1985).	No
The Spanish Main	Comet #???–???	14 issues	Serial	8 August 1953 – 7 November 1953	?	Amalgamated Press	Adaptation of the eponymous film.	No
Spartacus	Four Color (series 2) #1139	1 issue	One-shot	Gaylord DuBois	November 1960-January 1961	Dell Comics	Adaptation of the 1960 film based on the eponymous 1951 novel by Howard Fast.	No
Spawn	Spawn: The Movie	1 issue	One-shot	Ted Adams	December 1997	Image Comics	Adaptation of the 1997 film based on the Image Comics character of the same name.	No
Species	Species	4 issues	Limited series	June – August 1995	Dennis Feldman	Dark Horse Comics	Adaptation of the first film.	
Species	Species: Human Race	4 issues	Limited series	November 1996 – February 1997	Gordon Rennie, Stephen Blue, Stephen Bissette	Dark Horse Comics	Sequel story, following on immediately from the end of the first film.	
Species	Species Special	1 issue	One-shot	2007	Brian Pulido, Mico Suayan	Avatar Press		
Spider-Man (2002 film series)	Spider-Man: The Official Movie Adaptation	1 issue	One-shot	Stan Lee, Alan Davis	June 2002	Marvel Comics	Adaptation of the first film.	Spider-Man: The Official Comic Adaptation TP (0-7851-0903-X/978-0-7851-0903-7)
Spider-Man (2002 film series)	Spider-Man 2: The Official Comic Book Adaptation	1 issue	One-shot	Roberto Aguirre-Sacasa	August 2004	Marvel Comics	Adaptation of the second film.	Spider-Man 2: The Official Comic Adaptation TP (0-7851-1411-4/978-0-7851-1411-6)
Spider-Man (2002 film series)	Spider-Man 3: Movie Prequel	1 issue	One-shot	Todd Dezago	June 2007	Marvel Comics	Prequel to the third film.	
Spider-Man (2002 film series)	Spider-Man 3: The Black	1 issue	One-shot	Brian Michael Bendis	October 2007	Marvel Comics	Adaptation of the third film.	
The Spirit of Culver	Movie Comics #3	1 issue	Photo comics	?	DC Comics	June 1939	Condensed adaptation of the eponymous film.	No
Spy Kids	Disney Adventures		Comic story, ongoing series	Steve Behling, Michael Stewart	Disney Publishing Worldwide	September 2001, November 2001, January 2002, March 2002, April 2002, May 2002, June 2002, April 2003	Self-contained stories spanning several issue, the following stories in order: "Pop! Goes the World!", "Caught by the Web!", "The Menace of Micro-Man!", "F.A.N.G.s a Lot!", "The Big Drop!", "The Invisible Enemy!", "Fright Flight!" and "Face to Face with F.A.N.G.!".	No
Spy Kids	Spy Kids 3-D: Game Over	6 issues	Minicomic, limited series	2003		McDonald's	Based on the third film, published in anagylph 3D.	No
Spy Kids	Disney Adventures Comic Zone: "Tomorrow Trouble!"	1 issue	Comic story	Summer 2004		Disney Publishing Worldwide		No
Stagecoach (1939)	Movie Comics #2	1 issue	Photo comics	?	DC Comics	May 1939	Condensed adaptation of the eponymous film.	No
Star Reporter	Movie Comics #4	1 issue	Photo comics	?	DC Comics	July 1939	Condensed adaptation of the eponymous film.	No
Star Trek	Marvel Comics Super Special #15: "Star Trek: The Motion Picture"	1 issue	Magazine	Marv Wolfman	March 1980	Marvel Comics	Adaptation of the first film.	
Star Trek	A DC Movie Special – Star Trek III: The Search for Spock	1 issue	One-shot	Mike W. Barr	September 1984	DC Comics	Adaptation of the third film.	
Star Trek	A DC Movie Special – Star Trek IV: The Voyage Home	1 issue	One-shot	Mike W. Barr	April 1987	DC Comics	Adaptation of the fourth film.	
Star Trek	A DC Movie Special – Star Trek V: The Final Frontier	1 issue	One-shot	Peter David	August 1989	DC Comics	Adaptation of the fifth film.	
Star Trek	Star Trek VI: The Undiscovered Country	1 issue	One-shot	Peter David	January 1992	DC Comics	Adaptation of the sixth film.	
Star Trek	Star Trek Generations	1 issue	One-shot	Michael Jan Friedman	January 1995	DC Comics	Adaptation of the seventh film.	
Star Trek	Star Trek: First Contact	1 issue	One-shot	John Vornholt	November 1996	Marvel Comics, Paramount Comics	Adaptation of the eighth film.	
Star Trek	Star Trek II: The Wrath of Khan	3 issues	Limited series	Andy Schmidt	May – July 2009	IDW Publishing	Adaptation of the second film, published 27 years after the release of the film.	
Star Trek	Star Trek: Countdown	4 issues	Limited series	January – April 2009	Tim Jones, Mike Johnson	IDW Publishing	Prequel to the 2009 film.	
Star Trek	Star Trek: Nero	4 issues	Limited series	August – November 2009	Tim Jones, Mike Johnson	IDW Publishing	Prequel-midquel to the 2009 film.	
Star Trek	Star Trek: The Official Motion Picture Adaptation	6 issues	Limited series	Mike Johnson	February – August 2010	IDW Publishing	Adaptation of the 2009 film, published a year after the release of the film.	
Star Trek	Star Trek: Countdown to Darkness	4 issues	Limited series	January – April 2013	Mike Johnson	IDW Publishing	Prequel to Star Trek Into Darkness (2013).	
Star Trek	Star Trek: Khan	5 issues	Limited series	October 2013 – February 2014	Mike Johnson	IDW Publishing	Prequel-midquel to Star Trek Into Darkness (2013).	
Star Trek	Star Trek: The Motion Picture – Echoes	5 issues	Limited series	July – September 2023	Marc Guggenheim	IDW Publishing	Sequel to the first film.	
Star Wars (comics) (list)	Star Wars #1—6: "Star Wars" (1977)	6 issues	Comic story, serial	July – December 1977	Roy Thomas	Marvel Comics	First adaptation of the first film in the original trilogy; presented in six chapters: "Star Wars" (#1, 17 pages), "Six Against the Galaxy" (#2, 18 pages), "Death Star" (#3, 18 pages), "In Battle with Darth Vader" (#4, 17 pages), "Lo, the Moons of Yavin" (#5, 17 pages) and "Is this the Final Chapter?!" (#6, 17 pages).	
Star Wars (comics) (list)	Star Wars #39–44: "The Empire Strikes Back"	6 issues	Comic story, serial	Spring 1980	Archie Goodwin	Marvel Comics	Adaptation of the second film in the original trilogy; first published in its complete form as Marvel Comics Super Special #16 (Spring 1980).	
Star Wars (comics) (list)	Return of the Jedi	4 issues	October 1983 – January 1984	Limited series	Archie Goodwin	Marvel Comics	Adaptation of the third film in the original trilogy; first published in its complete form as Marvel Comics Super Special #27 (September 1983).	
Star Wars (comics) (list)	Star Wars: Droids #6–8: "Star Wars According to the Droids"	3 issues	Comic story, serial	February – June 1987	Dave Manak	Star Comics	Alternate telling of the first film in the original trilogy, narrating from the viewpoint of the series' side characters R2-D2 and C-3PO.	
Star Wars (comics) (list)	Star Wars: A New Hope — The Special Edition	4 issues	Limited series	January – April 1997	Bruce Jones	Dark Horse Comics	Second adaptation of the first film in the original trilogy, based on the 1997 "Special Edition".	
Star Wars (comics) (list)	Star Wars: Episode I — The Phantom Menace	4 issues	Limited series	Henry Gilroy	May 1999	Dark Horse Comics	Adaptation of the first film in the prequel trilogy .	
Star Wars (comics) (list)	Star Wars: Episode II — Attack of the Clones	4 issues	Limited series	Henry Gilroy	April – May 2002	Dark Horse Comics	Adaptation of the second film in the prequel trilogy.	
Star Wars (comics) (list)	Star Wars: Episode III — Revenge of the Sith	4 issues	Limited series	May 2005	Miles Lane	Dark Horse Comics	Adaptation of the third film in the prequel trilogy.	
Star Wars (comics) (list)	Star Wars: The Force Awakens	6 issues	Limited series	August 2016 – January 2017	Chuck Wendig	Marvel Comics	Adaptation of the first film in the sequel trilogy.	
Star Wars (comics) (list)	Rogue One: A Star Wars Story	6 issues	Limited series	June – November 2017	Jody Houser, Duane Swierczynski	Marvel Comics	Adaptation of the first canon spin-off film .	
Star Wars (comics) (list)	Star Wars: The Last Jedi	6 issues	Limited series	July – November 2018	Gary Whitta	Marvel Comics	Adaptation of the second film in the sequel trilogy.	
Star Wars (comics) (list)	Solo: A Star Wars Story	7 issues	Limited series	December 2018 – June 2019	Robbie Thompson	Marvel Comics	Adaptation of the second canon spin-off film.	
Star Wars (comics) (list)	Star Wars: The Rise of Skywalker	5 issues	Limited series	April – August 2025	Jody Houser	Marvel Comics	Adaptation of the third film in the sequel trilogy.	
Stargate (comics)	Stargate	4 issues	Limited series	July – October 1996	Don Chin, Barry Blair, Colin Chan	Entity Comics		
Stargate (comics)	Stargate: Doomsday World	3 issues	Limited series	November 1996 – January 1997	Raff Ienco, John Migliore	Entity Comics		
Stargate (comics)	Stargate: One Nation Under Ra	1 issue	One-shot	April 1997	John Migliore	Entity Comics		
Stargate (comics)	Stargate: Underworld	1 issue	One-shot	May 1997	John Migliore	Entity Comics		
Starship Troopers	Starship Troopers: Brute Creations	1 issue	One-shot	September 1997	Jan Strnad	Dark Horse Comics		
Starship Troopers	Starship Troopers	2 issues	Limited series	October – November 1997	Bruce Jones	Dark Horse Comics		
Starship Troopers	Starship Troopers: Insect Touch	3 issues	Limited series	May – August 1998	Warren Ellis	Dark Horse Comics		
Starship Troopers	Starship Troopers: Dominant Species	4 issues	Limited series	August – November 1998	Jan Strnad	Dark Horse Comics		
Steel	Steel: The Official Movie Adaptation	1 issue	One-shot	Louise Simonson	DC Comics	October 1997	Adaptation of the eponymous film based on the DC Comics character of the same name.	No
The Stooge	Movie Love #13	1 issue	One-shot	February 1952	?	Eastern Color Printing	Adaptation of the eponymous film.	No
Stormy, the Thoroughbred	Four Color (series 2) #537	1 issue	One-shot	February 1954	?	Dell Comics	Adaptation of the eponymous film, plus an alternating "double feature" story featuring Pluto, "The Uninvited Guest"; the main feature strip is at the upper 2/3 of the book while the supporting strip is the lower 1/3, 32 pages total with an introductory page and three one-page illustrations.	No
The Story of Mankind	Four Color (series 2) #851	1 issue	One-shot	January 1958	Gaylord DuBois	Dell Comics	A brief history of the human race, based more faithfully on the eponymous 1921 book by Hendrik Willem Van Loon than the 1957 film adaptation whose photo stills were used for the cover; 32 pages total plus two one-page stories, "The Builders" and "The Destroyers".	No
The Story of Robin Hood	Walt Disney's Treasury of Classic Tales: The Story of Robin Hood	25 installments	Newspaper strip	July 13 – December 28, 1952	Frank Reilly	King Features Syndicate	Adaptations of the eponymous film; the strip version was the inaugural installment of the newspaper strip feature Walt Disney's Treasury of Classic Tales, and the book version (32 pages total) was republished as Four Color (series 2) #669 (December 1955). The artwork for the strip version was done by Jesse Marsh, while the artwork for the book version was done by Morris Gollub and Jon Small.	
The Story of Robin Hood	Four Color (series 2) #413: "Robin Hood"	1 issue	One-shot	August 1952	Gaylord DuBois	Dell Comics	Adaptations of the eponymous film; the strip version was the inaugural installment of the newspaper strip feature Walt Disney's Treasury of Classic Tales, and the book version (32 pages total) was republished as Four Color (series 2) #669 (December 1955). The artwork for the strip version was done by Jesse Marsh, while the artwork for the book version was done by Morris Gollub and Jon Small.	No
The Story of Robin Hood	New Adventures of Walt Disney's Robin Hood #1–2	2 issues	Minicomic	1952	?	International Milling Company	Giveaway/mail order promo for Robin Hood Flour which spanned two issues; the first story was titled "The Miller's Ransom" and the second story was titled "Ghosts of Waylea Castle", both running for a total of 29 pages.	No
The Story of Ruth	Four Color (series 2) #1144	1 issue	One-shot	September–November 1960	Gaylord DuBois	Dell Comics	Adaptation of the eponymous film.	No
Strange Days	Strange Days	1 issue	One-shot	December 1995	Dan Chichester	Marvel Comics	Adaptation of the eponymous film.	No
Strangeland	Dee Snider's Strangeland: Seven Sins #1	1 (of 4) issues	Limited series (planned)	August 2007 – April 2008	Jesse Blaze Snider	Fangoria Comics, The Scream Factory	Sequel comic to the eponymous 1998 film.	No
Street Fighter	Street Fighter: The Battle for Shadaloo	1 issue	One-shot	Mike McAvennie	DC Comics	December 1994	Adaptation of the 1994 live action film based on the Capcom video game series.	No
Street Fighter II: The Animated Movie	Eiga Gensaku Street Fighter II (映画原作 ストリートファイターII)	1 volume	Manga	1994	Takayuki Sakai	Shogakukan	Published directly to tankōbon under the Tentōmushi Comics Special imprint.	
Streets of New York (1939)	Movie Comics #4	1 issue	Photo comics	July 1939	?	DC Comics	Condensed adaptation of the eponymous film.	No
Submarine Command	Movie Love #12	1 issue	One-shot	December 1951	?	Eastern Color Printing	Adaptation of the eponymous film.	No
Subspecies	Subspecies – In Full Color!	4 issues	Limited series	May – August 1991	Lowell Cunningham, M.C. Wyman	Eternity Comics		
Subspecies	Subspecies (2018)	3 issues	Limited series	March – May 2018	Cullen Bunn, Jimmy Johnston	Action Lab Entertainment		
Sukiyaki Western: Django	Sukiyaki Western: Django		Serialized manga	2007	Kotobuki Shiriagari	Shogakukan	Serizalied in Big Comic Superior.	
Summer Magic	Summer Magic	1 issue	One-shot	September 1963	?	Gold Key Comics	Adaptation of the eponymous film.	No
Sunset Carson	Cowboy Western Comics #27: "Sunset Carson Rides Again"	5 issues	One-shot	February 1950	Chad Kelly	Charlton Comics	Adaptation of the fourteenth film in the series.	No
Sunset Carson	Cowboy Western Comics #28: "Battling Marshal"	5 issues	One-shot	June 1950	?	Charlton Comics	Adaptation of the sixteenth film in the series.	No
Sunset Carson	Cowboy Western Comics #28: "Fighting Mustang"	5 issues	One-shot	June 1950	?	Charlton Comics	Adaptation of the twelfth film in the series.	No
Sunset Carson	Cowboy Western Comics #29: "Rio Grande"	5 issues	One-shot	October 1950	?	Charlton Comics	Adaptation of the fifteenth film in the series.	No
Sunset Carson	Cowboy Western Comics #30: "Deadline"	5 issues	One-shot	December 1950	?	Charlton Comics	Adaptation of the thirteenth film in the series.	No
Superman (1978 film series)	The Superman Movie Special	1 issue	One-shot	September 1983	Cary Bates	DC Comics	Adaptation of Superman III (1983).	No
Superman (1978 film series)	Supergirl Movie Special	1 issue	One-shot	Joey Cavalieri	February 1985	DC Comics	Adaptation of the Supergirl spin-off film.	
Superman (1978 film series)	Superman IV Movie Special	1 issue	One-shot	Bob Rozakis	October 1987	DC Comics	Adaptation of Superman IV: The Quest for Peace (1987).	
Superman (1978 film series)	Superman '78	6 issues	Limited series	Robert Venditti	August 2021 – January 2022	DC Comics		
Superman (1978 film series)	Superman '78: The Metal Curtain	6 issues	Limited series	Robert Venditti		DC Comics		
Superman Returns	Superman Returns: The Official Movie Adaptation	1 issue	One-shot	Martin Pasko	July 2006	DC Comics	Adaptation of the eponymous film.	Superman Returns: The Movie and Other Tales: 1-4012-0950-5/978-1-4012-0950-6
Superman Returns	Superman Returns Prequel: Krypton to Earth	4 issues	One-shot	Jimmy Palmiotti, Justin Gray	August 2006	DC Comics	Part one of a four-issue cycle.	Superman Returns: The Prequels: 1-4012-1146-1/978-1-4012-1146-2
Superman Returns	Superman Returns Prequel: Ma Kent	4 issues	One-shot	Marc Andreyko	August 2006	DC Comics	Part two of a four-issue cycle.	Superman Returns: The Prequels: 1-4012-1146-1/978-1-4012-1146-2
Superman Returns	Superman Returns Prequel: Lex Luthor	4 issues	One-shot	Jimmy Palmiotti, Justin Gray	August 2006	DC Comics	Part three of a four-issue cycle.	Superman Returns: The Prequels: 1-4012-1146-1/978-1-4012-1146-2
Superman Returns	Superman Returns Prequel: Lois Lane	4 issues	One-shot	Marc Andreyko	August 2006	DC Comics	Part four of a four-issue cycle.	Superman Returns: The Prequels: 1-4012-1146-1/978-1-4012-1146-2
Swamp Thing	The Saga of Swamp Thing Annual #1: "Swamp Thing — The Official Adaptation of the Embassy Pictures Film"	1 issue	Annual	November 1982	Bruce Jones	DC Comics	Adaptation of the 1982 film based on the DC Comics character of the same name.	No
Swiss Family Robinson (1960)	Walt Disney's Treasury of Classic Tales: Swiss Family Robinson	13 installments	Newspaper strip	October 2 – December 25, 1960	Frank Reilly	King Features Syndicate	Adaptations of the 1960 film based on the eponymous 1812 novel by Johann David Wyss; the artwork for the strip version was done by Jesse Marsh, while the artwork for the book version (32 pages total) was done by John Ushler.	
Swiss Family Robinson (1960)	Four Color (series 2) #1156	1 issue	One-shot	January–March 1961	?	Dell Comics	Adaptations of the 1960 film based on the eponymous 1812 novel by Johann David Wyss; the artwork for the strip version was done by Jesse Marsh, while the artwork for the book version (32 pages total) was done by John Ushler.	No
Swiss Tour	Movie Love #3: "Four Days Leave"	1 issue	One-shot	1950	?	Eastern Color Printing	Adaptation of the eponymous film, under the alternative American title.	No
The Sword and the Rose	Walt Disney's Treasury of Classic Tales: The Sword and the Rose	19 installments	Newspaper strip	June 21 – October 25, 1953	Frank Reilly	King Features Syndicate	Adaptations of the eponymous film; the book version (34 pages total) was later republished as Four Color (series 2) #682 (February 1956). The artwork for the strip version was done by Jesse Marsh, while the artwork for the book version was done by Dick Rockwell.	
The Sword and the Rose	Four Color (series 2) #505	1 issue	One-shot	October 1953	?	Dell Comics	Adaptations of the eponymous film; the book version (34 pages total) was later republished as Four Color (series 2) #682 (February 1956). The artwork for the strip version was done by Jesse Marsh, while the artwork for the book version was done by Dick Rockwell.	No
The Sword in the Stone	Walt Disney's Treasury of Classic Tales: The Sword in the Stone	13 installments	Newspaper strip	October 6 – December 29, 1963	Frank Reilly	King Features Syndicate	Adaptations of the eponymous film; the story in the book version is presented in eight chapters throughout the main 64 pages of the book and included two pages of twelve movie stills and a pin-up illustration of the main characters. The artwork for the strip version was done by John Ushler, while the artwork for the book version was done by Al Hubbard with additional pencilling by Ross Andru.	
The Sword in the Stone	Walt Disney's The Sword in the Stone	1 issue	One-shot	February 1964	Carl Fallberg	Gold Key Comics	Adaptations of the eponymous film; the story in the book version is presented in eight chapters throughout the main 64 pages of the book and included two pages of twelve movie stills and a pin-up illustration of the main characters. The artwork for the strip version was done by John Ushler, while the artwork for the book version was done by Al Hubbard with additional pencilling by Ross Andru.	No
The Sword in the Stone	Walt Disney's Wart and the Wizard	1 issue	One-shot	February 1964	Vic Lockman	Gold Key Comics	The comics features two self-contained strip stories, "In the Days of the Knights" (19 pages) and "Bewitched Kingdom" (13 pages), a two-part "Medieval Adventure Map" (drawn by Tony Strobl and separated pages apart by the two strips) and a pin-up illustration of the book's cover.	No

== T ==
Based on	Title	Length	Format	Publication date	Authors	Publisher	Notes	Collected editions
Tales of Terror	Dell Movie Classics #12-793-302	1 issue	One-shot	February 1963	?	Dell Comics	Adaptation of the eponymous film.	No
Tammy Tell Me True	Four Color (series 2) #1233	1 issue	One-shot	Ken Fitch	September–November 1961	Dell Comics	Adaptation of the eponymous film.	No
Tank Girl	Tank Girl: Movie Adaptation	1 issue	One-shot	1995	Peter Milligan	DC Comics/Vertigo	Adaptation of the eponymous film based on the British comic book character of the same name.	No
Tarzan (1999)	Disney's Tarzan	2 issues	Limited series	June – July 1999	Greg Ehrbar	Dark Horse Comics	Adaptation of the eponymous film.	No
Teenage Mutant Ninja Turtles (1990 film series)	Teenage Mutant Ninja Turtles: The Movie	1 issue	One-shot	Summer 1990	Peter Laird, Kevin Eastman	Archie Comics	Adaptation of the 1990 film.	No
Teenage Mutant Ninja Turtles (1990 film series)	Teenage Mutant Ninja Turtles Movie II: The Secret of the Ooze	1 issue	One-shot	Summer 1991	Justine Korman	Archie Comics	Adaptation of the second film.	No
Teenage Mutant Ninja Turtles (1990 film series)	Teenage Mutant Ninja Turtles III: The Movie	1 issue	One-shot	March 1993		Archie Comics	Adaptation of the third film.	No
Ten Tall Men	Fawcett Movie Comic #16	1 issue	One-shot	April 1952	Leo Dorfman	Fawcett Comics	Adaptation of the eponymous film.	No
Ten Who Dared	Four Color (series 2) #1178	1 issue	One-shot	December 1960-February 1961	?	Dell Comics	Adaptation of the eponymous film.	No
Tentacles	Tentacles (テンタクルズ)	1 issue	Magazine	Shinji Imura	Akita Shoten	July 1977	Gekiga adaptation of the eponymous 1977 film (40 pages); Published in Monthly Shōnen Champion.	No
Terminator	Terminator 2: Judgment Day	3 issues	Limited series	September – October 1991	Gregory Wright	Marvel Comics	Adaptation of the second film.	
Terminator	RoboCop Versus The Terminator	4 issues	Limited series	May 1992	Frank Miller	Dark Horse Comics	First crossover with RoboCop.	
Terminator	Terminator 3	#1–6	Limited series	June – December 2003	Iván Brandon, Jeff Amano (story concept)	Beckett Comics	Based on the third film.	
Terminator	Terminator 2 #6–7: "Painkiller Jane vs. The Terminator"	2 issues	Limited series	December 2007 – March 2008	Jimmy Palmiotti, Nigel Raynor	Dynamite Entertainment	Parts two and four of a four-part crossover storyline with Painkiller Jane.	
Terminator	Terminator Salvation: Movie Prequel	4 issues	Limited series	January – April 2009	Dara Naraghi	IDW Publishing	Prequel to the fourth film.	
Terminator	Terminator Salvation: Movie Preview	1 issue	One-shot	April 2009	Jeff Mariotte	IDW Publishing	Based on the fourth film.	
Terminator	Terminator/RoboCop: Kill Human	4 issues	Limited series	July – November 2011	Rob Williams	Dynamite Entertainment	Second crossover with RoboCop.	
Terminator	Transformers vs. The Terminator	4 issues	Limited series	March – September 2020	David Mariotte, John Barber, Tom Waltz	IDW Publishing, Dark Horse Comics	Crossover with Hasbro's Transformers.	
The Texas Chainsaw Massacre	Leatherface	4 issues	Limited series	Mort Castle	March 1991 – May 1992	Northstar Comics	Loose adaptation of the third film.	
The Texas Chainsaw Massacre	Jason vs. Leatherface	3 issues	Limited series	October 1995 – January 1996	Nancy Collins, David Imhoff (plot)	Topps Comics	Non-canonical crossover with Friday the 13th.	No
The Texas Chainsaw Massacre	The Texas Chainsaw Massacre Special	1 issue	One-shot	April 2005	Brian Pulido, Jacen Burrows Fuller	Avatar Press		
The Texas Chainsaw Massacre	The Texas Chainsaw Massacre: The Grind	3 issues	Limited series	May – June 2006	Brian Pulido, Daniel HDR	Avatar Press		
The Texas Chainsaw Massacre	The Texas Chainsaw Massacre: Fearbook	1 issues	One-shot	2006	Antony Johnston	Avatar Press		
The Texas Chainsaw Massacre	The Texas Chainsaw Massacre (2007)	6 issues	Limited series	January – June 2007	Dan Abnett, Andy Lanning	WildStorm		
The Texas Chainsaw Massacre	The Texas Chainsaw Massacre: Cut!	1 issue	One-shot	August 2007	Will Pfeifer	WildStorm		
The Texas Chainsaw Massacre	The Texas Chainsaw Massacre: About a Boy	1 issue	One-shot	September 2007	Dan Abnett, Andy Lanning	WildStorm		
The Texas Chainsaw Massacre	The Texas Chainsaw Massacre: By Himself	1 issue	One-shot	October 2007	Dan Abnett, Andy Lanning	WildStorm		
The Texas Chainsaw Massacre	New Line Cinema's Tales of Horror #1: "The Texas Chainsaw Salesman"	1 issue	One-shot	November 2007	Christos Gage, Peter Milligan	WildStorm		
The Texas Chainsaw Massacre	The Texas Chainsaw Massacre: Raising Cain	3 issues	Limited series	July – September 2008	Bruce Jones	WildStorm		
The Texas Rangers	Motion Picture Comics #106	1 issue	One-shot	September 1951	Leo Dorfman	Fawcett Comics	Adaptation of the eponymous 1951 film.	No
That Dangerous Age	Movie Love #2: "If This Be Sin"	1 issue	One-shot	April 1950	?	Eastern Color Printing	Adaptation of the eponymous film, under the alternative American title.	No
That Darn Cat!	That Darn Cat!	1 issue	One-shot	?	Gold Key Comics	February 1966	Adaptation of the eponymous film.	No
That's My Boy	Movie Love #12	1 issue	One-shot	December 1951	?	Eastern Color Printing	Adaptation of the eponymous film.	No
The Thief of Baghdad (1961)	Four Color (series 2) #1229	1 issue	One-shot	September–November 1961	Ken Fitch	Dell Comics	Adaptation of the eponymous 1961 film.	No
The Thing (1982)	The Thing from Another World	2 issues	Limited series	1991 – 1992	Chuck Pfarrer	Dark Horse Comics		
The Thing (1982)	The Thing from Another World: Climate of Fear	4 issues	Limited series	July – December 1992	John Arcudi	Dark Horse Comics		
The Thing (1982)	The Thing from Another World: Eternal Vows	4 issues	Limited series	December 1993 – March 1994	David de Vries	Dark Horse Comics		
The Thing (1982)	Dark Horse Comics #13–16: "The Thing from Another World: Questionable Research"	4 issues	Serial	December 1993 – March 1994	Edward Martin III	Dark Horse Comics		No
The Thing (1982)	The Thing: The Northman Nightmare	1 issue	Digital comic	Steve Niles	Dark Horse Comics	Tie-in media	Three-part prequel to the 2011 prequel film.	No
Those Magnificent Men in Their Flying Machines	Those Magnificent Men in Their Flying Machines	1 issue	One-shot	October 1965	Paul S. Newman	Gold Key Comics	Adaptation of the eponymous film.	No
The Three Caballeros	Four Color (series 2) #71: "Walt Disney's Three Caballeros"	1 issue	One-shot	Walt Kelly	Dell Comics	May 1945	Indirect adaptation of the eponymous film.	No
The Three Caballeros	Silly Symphonies #3	1 issue	One-shot	?	Dell Comics	February 1954	Adaptations of two segments from the film, "Pablo, the Cold-blooded Penguin" (10 pages) and "The Flying Gauchito" (8 pages) respectively.	No
Three Husbands	Movie Love #7	1 issue	One-shot	February 1951	?	Eastern Color Printing	Adaptation of the eponymous film.	No
The Three Musketeers (1993)	Disney's The Three Musketeers	2 issues	Limited series	January – February 1994	Bobbi Weiss	Marvel Comics	Adaptation of the 1993 film version based on the eponymous 1844 novel by Alexandre Dumas.	No
The Three Stooges	Dell Movie Classics #01-828-208: "The Three Stooges Meet Hercules"	1 issue	One-shot	August 1962	?	Dell Comics	Adaptation of the eponymous third feature film in the series.	No
The Three Stooges	The Three Stooges in Orbit Film Story	1 issue	Photo comics, one-shot	November 1962	?	Gold Key Comics	Adaptation of the eponymous fourth feature film in the series.	No
The Three Stooges	The Three Stooges #15: "The Three Stooges Go Around the World in a Daze"	2 issues	Comic story	January 1964	?	Gold Key Comics	Adaptation of the eponymous fifth feature film in the series.	No
The Three Stooges	The Three Stooges #22: "The Three Stooges — The Outlaws Is Coming"	2 issues	Comic story	March 1965	?	Gold Key Comics	Adaptation of the eponymous sixth feature film in the series; the opening page is a full summary illustrated with still photos from the film, with the full 23 page adaptation, titled "The Three Stooges Meet the Gunfighters", following after.	No
A Tiger Walks	A Tiger Walks	1 issue	One-shot	June 1964	?	Gold Key Comics	Adaptation of the eponymous film.	No
Time Bandits	Time Bandits	1 issue	One-shot	February 1982	Steve Parkhouse	Marvel Comics	Adaptation of the eponymous film.	No
The Time Machine (1960)	Four Color (series 2) #1085	1 issue	One-shot	July–September 1960	?	Dell Comics	Adaptation of the 1960 film version based on the eponymous 1895 novel by H. G. Wells.	No
Timecop	Timecop	2 issues	Limited series	September – October 1994	Mark Verheiden	Dark Horse Comics	Adaptation of the eponymous film; based on the comic story "Time Cop: A Man Out of Time" from Dark Horse Comics #1–3 (August–October 1992).	No
The Tingler	Vincent Price Presents Special #1–2: "The Tinglers"	2 issues	Limited series	September – October 2009	Mark Miller	TidalWave Productions		No
Tintin and the Lake of Sharks	Tintin and the Lake of Sharks	1 volume	Photo comics	1973	?	Éditions Casterman/Methuen Publishing	Adaptation of the eponymous film, using photographed cels for the comic panels; originally published in Belgium and translated into English by Leslie Lonsdale-Cooper and Michael Turner. An alternate newspaper strip adaptation, drawn by Bob de Moor, appeared in Le Soir through 1972–1973.	No
Titan A.E.	Titan A.E.	3 issues	Limited series	May – July 2000	Scott Allie	Dark Horse Comics	Prequel to the eponymous film.	No
TMNT	TMNT: Official Movie Prequel	5 issues	Limited series	March – April 2007	Stephen Murphy, Jake Black	Mirage Studios	Each individual issue focusing on one character, in publication order: Raphael, Michelangelo, Donatello, April and Leonardo.	TMNT: The Collected Movie Books: 0-9787029-7-2/978-0-9787029-7-7
TMNT	TMNT: Official Movie Adaptation	1 issue	One-shot	April 2007	Stephen Murphy	Mirage Studios	Adaptation of the 2007 animated film.	TMNT: The Collected Movie Books: 0-9787029-7-2/978-0-9787029-7-7
To Die For	To Die For	1 issue	One-shot	March 1989	Leslie King	Blackthorne Publishing	Adaptation of the eponymous film.	No
Toby Tyler or 10 Weeks with a Circus	Four Color (series 2) #1092: "Walt Disney's Toby Tyler"	1 issue	One-shot	March–May 1960	?	Dell Comics	Adaptation of the eponymous film.	No
Tom Thumb	Four Color (series 2) #972	1 issue	One-shot	January 1959	Eric Freiwald, Robert Shaefer	Dell Comics	Adaptation of the eponymous 1959 film.	No
The Tomb of Ligeia	Dell Movie Classics #12-830-506	1 issue	One-shot	April–June 1965	?	Dell Comics	Adaptation of the eponymous film.	No
Tonka	Four Color (series 2) #966	1 issue	One-shot	January 1959	?	Dell Comics	Adaptation of the eponymous film.	No
The Torch	Movie Love #4	1 issue	One-shot	August 1950	?	Eastern Color Printing	Adaptation of the eponymous film.	No
Total Recall (1990)	Total Recall (1990)	1 issue	One-shot	August 1990	Elliot S. Maggin	DC Comics	Adaptation of the 1990 film.	No
Total Recall (1990)	Total Recall: Life on Mars	4 issues	Limited series	May – August 2011	Vince Moore	Dynamite Entertainment		
The Toxic Avenger	The Toxic Avenger (1991)	11 issues	Ongoing series	April 1991 – February 1992	Doug Moench	Marvel Comics		
The Toxic Avenger	The New Adventures of the Toxic Avenger	1 issue	One-shot	July 2000		Troma Comics		No
The Toxic Avenger	Lloyd Kaufman Presents: The Toxic Avenger and Other Tromatic Tales	1 issue	Graphic novel	October 2007	Sean McKeever, Tony Moore, B. Clay Moore, Jeremy Haun, Steve Kurth, Tim Seeley	Devil's Due Publishing		No
Toy Story	Toy Story (1995)	2 issues	Limited series	1995	Bob Foster	Marvel Comics	Adaptation of the first film.	
Toy Story	Toy Story: The Mysterious Stranger	4 issues	Limited series	May – July 2009	Dan Jolley	Boom! Studios		
Toy Story	Toy Story (2009)	8 issues	Limited series	November 2009 – September 2010	Jesse Blaze Snider	Boom! Studios		
Toy Story	Toy Story: Tales from the Toy Chest	4 issues	Limited series	July – October 2010	Jesse Blaze Snider			
Toy Story	Toy Story (2012)	4 issues	Limited series	March – June 2012	Tea Orsi	Marvel Comics		
Toy Story	Toy Story (2017)			2017		Joe Books Ltd.		
Toy Story	Toy Story Adventures	2 volumes	Graphic novels	April – September 2019	Tea Orsi, Alessandro Ferrari, Ian Rimmer, Alessandro Sisti, Carlo Panaro	Dark Horse Comics		No
Toy Story	Toy Story 4	1 volume	Graphic novel	May 2019	Haden Blackman	Dark Horse Comics	Based on the fourth film.	No
Toy Story	Toy Story – Special Collector's Manga	1 volume	OEL manga	June 2019	Tetsuhiro Koshita	Tokyopop	Manga adaptation of the first and second films.	No
Toy Story	Toy Story: The Story of the Movies in Comics	1 volume	Graphic novel	December 2019	Alessandro Ferrari	Dark Horse Comics	Omnibus adaptation of the four films.	No
Trancers	Trancers: The Adventures of Jack Deth	2 issues	Limited series	August – September 1991	S.A. Bennett	Eternity Comics		No
Trancers	Trancers (2015)	3 issues	Limited series	October 2015 – January 2016	Justin Gray, Jimmy Palmiotti	Action Lab Entertainment		
Transformers	Transformers: Official Movie Adaptation	4 issues	Limited series	June 2007	Kris Oprisko	IDW Publishing	Adaptation of the first film in the live action series.	
Transformers	Transformers: Revenge of the Fallen — Official Movie Adaptation	4 issues	Limited series	May – June 2009	Simon Furman	IDW Publishing	Adaptation of the second film in the live action series.	
Transformers	Transformers: Dark of the Moon — Movie Adaptation	4 issues	Limited series	June 2011	John Barber	IDW Publishing	Adaptation of the third film in the live action series.	
The Transformers: The Movie	The Transformers: The Movie	3 issues	Limited series	December 1986 – February 1987	Ralph Macchio	Marvel Comics	First adaptation of the 1986 animated film; the overall series is adapted from the early August 1985 draft of the screenplay.	
The Transformers: The Movie	Transformers: The Animated Movie	4 issues	Limited series	October 2006 – January 2007	Bob Budiansky	IDW Publishing	Second adaptation of the 1986 animated film, published on the film's 20th anniversary; the trade paperback collection features three pages of expanded scenes not shown in the aforementioned film.	
The Transformers: The Movie	Transformers: Deviations	1 issue	Limited series	March 2016	Brandon M. Easton	IDW Publishing	Non-canonical alternate telling of the film established by a point of divergence; part of IDW's Deviations event comic series.	
Treasure Island (1950)	Four Color (series 2) #624: "Walt Disney's Treasure Island"	1 issue	One-shot	April 1955	Paul S. Newman	Dell Comics	Adaptation of the 1950 film version based on the eponymous 1883 novel by Robert Louis Stevenson.	No
The Tripper	David Arquette's The Tripper	1 issue	One-shot	May 2007	Joe Harris	Image Comics	Adaptation of the eponymous film.	No
Tron (comics)	Tron: The Ghost in the Machine	6 issues	Limited series	April 2006 – September 2008	Landry Walker, Eric Jones	Slave Labor Graphics	Sequel to the non-canon video game spin-off Tron 2.0.	
Tron (comics)	Tron: Betrayal	2 issues	Limited series	October – November 2010	Jai Nitz	Marvel Comics	Prequel set between the first film and Legacy.	
Tron (comics)	Tron: Original Movie Adaptation	2 issues	Limited series	January – February 2011	Peter David	Marvel Comics	Adaptation of the original film.	
True-Life Adventures	Four Color (series 2) #625: "Beaver Valley"	8 issues	One-shot	April 1955	August Lenox	Dell Comics	Adaptation of the second film in the series In Beaver Valley (1950).	No
True-Life Adventures	Four Color (series 2) #665: "The African Lion"	8 issues	One-shot	November 1955	August Lenox	Dell Comics	Adaptation of the eponymous tenth film in the series.	No
True-Life Adventures	Four Color (series 2) #700: "Water Birds and the Olympic Elk"	8 issues	One-shot	April 1956	August Lenox	Dell Comics	Adaptations of the eponymous fourth and fifth films in the series.	No
True-Life Adventures	Four Color (series 2) #749: "Secrets of Life"	8 issues	One-shot	November 1956	August Lenox	Dell Comics	Adaptation of the eponymous eleventh film in the series.	No
True-Life Adventures	Four Color (series 2) #758: "Bear Country"	8 issues	One-shot	December 1956	August Lenox	Dell Comics	Adaptation of the eponymous sixth film in the series.	No
True-Life Adventures	Four Color (series 2) #847: "Perri"	8 issues	One-shot	October 1957	August Lenox	Dell Comics	Adaptation of the eponymous twelfth film in the series.	No
True-Life Adventures	Four Color (series 2) #943: "White Wilderness"	8 issues	One-shot	October 1958	?	Dell Comics	Adaptation of the eponymous thirteenth film in the series.	No
True-Life Adventures	Four Color (series 2) #1136: "Jungle Cat"	8 issues	One-shot	September–November 1960	?	Dell Comics	Adaptation of the eponymous fourteenth film in the series.	No
The True Story of Jesse James	Four Color (series 2) #757	1 issue	One-shot	March 1957	?	Dell Comics	Adaptation of the eponymous film.	No
Twice-Told Tales	Dell Movie Classics #840	1 issue	One-shot	November 1963-January 1964	Paul S. Newman	Dell Comics	Adaptation of the eponymous film.	No
Twins of Evil	The House of Hammer #7	1 issue	One-shot	April 1977	Chris Lowder	Top Sellers Ltd.	Adaptation of the eponymous film.	No
Two on a Guillotine	Dell Movie Classics #850	1 issue	One-shot	April–June 1965	Paul S. Newman	Dell Comics	Adaptation of the eponymous film.	No
Two Weeks with Love	Movie Love #6	1 issue	One-shot	December 1950	?	Eastern Color Printing	Adaptation of the eponymous film.	No
Two Thousand Maniacs!	2000 Maniacs	3 issues	Limited series	Jack Herman	Aircel Comics	September – November 1991		No

== U ==
Based on	Title	Length	Format	Publication date	Authors	Publisher	Notes	Collected editions
The Under-Pup	Movie Comics #6	1 issue	Photo comics, comic story	September–October 1939	?	DC Comics	Condensed adaptation of the eponymous film presented in photographic stills adapted to comics format; ten pages total. The panels were airbrushed and inked over the stills.	No
Undersea Super Train: Marine Express	Osamu Tezuka's Marine Express (手塚治虫のマリンエクスプレス)	3 volumes	Manga	September 2016 – January 2018	Shigeto Ikehara	Homesha Books	Reimagining adaptation of the eponymous 1979 anime television film; published directly to tankōbon in three complete volumes.	List: Volume 1 (978-4-8342-8460-7); Volume 2 (978-4-8342-8464-5); Volume 3 (978-4-8342-8476-8)
The Underwater City	Four Color (series 2) #1328	1 issue	One-shot	March–May 1962	Alex Gordon	Dell Comics	Adaptation of the eponymous film.	No
Underworld	Underworld	1 volume	Graphic novel	September 2003	Kris Oprisko	IDW Publishing	Adaptation of the eponymous first film.	
Underworld	Underworld: Red in Tooth and Claw	4 issues	Limited series	March – May 2004	Kris Oprisko, Danny McBride	IDW Publishing	Prequel to the first film.	
Underworld	Underworld: Evolution	1 issue	Graphic novel	February 2006	Kris Oprisko	IDW Publishing	Adaptation of the eponymous second film.	
Underworld	Underworld: Rise of the Lycans	2 issues	Limited series	November 2008	Kevin Grevioux	IDW Publishing	Adaptation of the eponymous third film.	
Underworld	Underworld: Blood Wars	1 issue	One-shot	January 2017	Kevin Grevioux	Darkstorm Comics	Adaptation of the eponymous fifth film.	
The Underworld Story	The Underworld Story	1 issue	One-shot	1950	?	Avon Comics	Adaptation of the eponymous film.	No
The Unknown Man	The Unknown Man	1 issue	One-shot	1951	?	Avon Comics	Adaptation of the eponymous film.	No
Unidentified Flying Oddball	Walt Disney Showcase #52	1 issue	One-shot	September 1979	Mary Virginia Carey	Gold Key Comics	Adaptation of the eponymous film.	No
Universal Soldier	Universal Soldier	3 issues	Limited series	September – November 1992	Clint McElroy	NOW Comics	Adaptation of the eponymous first film.	No

== V ==
Based on	Title	Length	Format	Publication date	Authors	Publisher	Notes	Collected editions
The Valley of Gwangi	Dell Movie Classics #01-880-912	1 issue	One-shot	December 1969	?	Dell Comics	Adaptation of the eponymous film.	No
Vampire Circus	The House of Hammer #17	1 issue		February 1978	Steve Parkhouse	Top Sellers Ltd.	Adaptation of the eponymous film.	No
The Vanishing Westerner	Motion Picture Comics #101	1 issue	One-shot	1950	Joe Millard	Fawcett Comics	Adaptation of the eponymous film.	No
The Vanquished	Movie Love #22	1 issue		August 1953	?	Eastern Color Printing	Adaptation of the eponymous film.	No
View Askewniverse	Oni Double Feature #1: "Walt Flanagan's Dog"	1 issue		January 1998	Kevin Smith	Oni Press		Chasing Dogma TP (1-58240-206-X); Clerks: The Comic Books TPB; Tales from the Clerks TPB
View Askewniverse	Clerks: The Comic Book	1 issue	One-shot	February 1998	Kevin Smith	Oni Press	Based on Clerks (1994).	Chasing Dogma TP (1-58240-206-X); Clerks: The Comic Books TPB; Tales from the Clerks TPB
View Askewniverse	Chasing Dogma	1 issue	Graphic novel	July 1998 – October 1999	Kevin Smith	Oni Press	Story takes place in between the films Chasing Amy (1997) and Dogma (1999).	Chasing Dogma TP (1-58240-206-X); Clerks: The Comic Books TPB; Tales from the Clerks TPB
View Askewniverse	Clerks Holiday Special	1 issue	One-shot	December 1998	Kevin Smith	Oni Press	Based on Clerks (1994).	Chasing Dogma TP (1-58240-206-X); Clerks: The Comic Books TPB; Tales from the Clerks TPB
View Askewniverse	Clerks: The Lost Scene	1 issue	One-shot	December 1999	Kevin Smith	Oni Press	Based on Clerks (1994).	Chasing Dogma TP (1-58240-206-X); Clerks: The Comic Books TPB; Tales from the Clerks TPB
View Askewniverse	Bluntman and Chronic	1 issue	Graphic novel	December 2001	Kevin Smith	Image Comics	Adaptation of the story within a story from Jay and Silent Bob Strike Back (2001).	Chasing Dogma TP (1-58240-206-X); Clerks: The Comic Books TPB; Tales from the Clerks TPB
View Askewniverse	Tales from Clerks II	1 issue	One-shot	July 2006	Kevin Smith	Graphitti Designs	Prequel to the film Clerks II (2006).	Chasing Dogma TP (1-58240-206-X); Clerks: The Comic Books TPB; Tales from the Clerks TPB
The Vikings	Four Color (series 2) #910	1 issue	One-shot	June 1958	Leo Dorfman	Dell Comics	Adaptation of the eponymous film.	No
The Virgin Queen (1955)	Four Color (series 2) #644: "Sir Walter Raleigh"	1 issue	One-shot	August 1955	?	Dell Comics	Adaptation of the eponymous film, marketed under an alternative title.	No
Voyage to the Bottom of the Sea	Four Color (series 2) #1230	1 issue	One-shot	August–October 1961	?	Dell Comics	Adaptation of the eponymous film.	No

== W ==
Based on	Title	Length	Format	Publication date	Authors	Publisher	Notes	Collected editions
Walk East on Beacon	Motion Picture Comics #113	1 issue	One-shot	November 1952	Leo Dorfman	Fawcett Comics	Adaptation of the eponymous film.	No
WALL-E	WALL-E	8 issues	Limited series	November 2009 – June 2010	J. Torres	Boom! Studios	The first four issues, including #0, are set before the events of the film.	Recharge TP (1-60886-512-6 / 978-1-60886-512-3); Out There TP (1-60886-568-1 / 978-1-60886-568-0)
The War Wagon	Dell Movie Classics #12-533-709	1 issue	One-shot	September 1967	?	Dell Comics	Adaptation of the eponymous film.	No
Warlock	Warlock	4 issues	Limited series	March – June 2009	Nick Lyons	TidalWave Productions	Continuation of the eponymous film series.	No
Warpath	Fawcett Movie Comic #13	1 issue	One-shot	August 1951	Leo Dorfman	Fawcett Comics	Adaptation of the eponymous film.	No
The Warriors	The Warriors	5 issues	Limited series	February 2009 – February 2011	David Atchison	Dabel Brothers Productions, Dynamite Entertainment	Adaptation of the eponymous film.	
The Warriors	The Warriors: Jailbreak	4 issues	Limited series	2012	Erik Henriksen	Dynamite Entertainment	Sequel comic to the film.	
Waterworld	Waterworld: Children of Leviathan	4 issues	Limited series	August – November 1997	Christopher Golden, Tom Sniegoski	Acclaim Comics	Sequel comic to the film.	No
Waxwork	Waxwork	1 issue	One-shot	November 1988	John Stephenson	Blackthorne Publishing	Adaptation of the eponymous film.	No
Westward Ho the Wagons!	Four Color (series 2) #738: "Westward Ho the Wagons!"	2 issues	One-shots	October 1956	Elizabeth Beecher	Dell Comics	Adaptation of the eponymous film.	No
Westward Ho the Wagons!	Four Color (series 2) #821: "Wringle Wrangle"	2 issues	One-shots	?	July 1957	Dell Comics	Continuation of the eponymous film.	No
Wheels on Meals	Jackie Chan's Spartan X: The Armour of Heaven	3 issues	Limited series	May – August 1997	Michael Golden	Topps Comics	Planned six-issue limited series cancelled after the first three issues published.	No
Wheels on Meals	Jackie Chan's Spartan X: Hell Bent Hero for Hire	4 issues	Limited series	March – August 1998	Michael Golden	Image Comics		No
When Worlds Collide	Motion Picture Comics #110	1 issue	One-shot	May 1951	Leo Dorfman	Fawcett Comics	Adaptation of the eponymous film.	No
White Fang (1991)	White Fang	1 volume	Graphic novel	1990	Bobbi J. G. Weiss	W. D. Publications Inc.	Adaptation of the 1991 film version based on the eponymous 1906 novel by Jack London.	
White Tie and Tails	Movie Comics #2	1 issue	One-shot	February 1947	Claude Lapham	Fiction House	Adaptation of the eponymous film.	No
Who Framed Roger Rabbit	Marvel Graphic Novel #41: "Who Framed Roger Rabbit: The Official Comics Adaptation"	1 volume	Graphic novel	May 1988	Daan Jippes, Don Ferguson	Marvel Comics	Adaptation of the eponymous film.	
Who Framed Roger Rabbit	Marvel Graphic Novel #54: "Roger Rabbit: The Resurrection of Doom"	1 volume	Graphic novel	1989	Bob Foster	Marvel Comics	Sequel story, followed by an adaptation of the short film Tummy Trouble (1989).	
Who Framed Roger Rabbit	Roger Rabbit	18 issues	Ongoing series	June 1990 – November 1991	Kate Worley, Doug Rice, Martin Pasko, Peter David, Jim Bricker, John Blair Moore, Doug Murray, Marc Hansen	Disney Comics		
Who Framed Roger Rabbit	Roger Rabbit's Toontown	5 issues	Ongoing series	May – August 1991	Tom Yakutis, John Blair Moore, Jack Enyart, Scott Saavedra, Dan Mishkin, Marc Hansen, Chuck Fiala, Doug Rice, Doug Murray	Disney Comics		Disney's Cartoon Tales – Roger Rabbit: Who Framed Rick Flint? TPB
Who Framed Roger Rabbit	Roger Rabbit in 3-D	1 issue	One-shot	1992	Doug Rice, Jim Bricker	Disney Comics	Reprint of four stories from Roger Rabbit #2, #4, #6 and #11; originally published in Anaglyph 3D.	
Who's Minding the Mint?	Dell Movie Classics #12-924-708	1 issue	One-shot	August 1967	?	Dell Comics	Adaptation of the eponymous film.	No
Willow	Willow	3 issues	Limited series	August – October 1988	Jo Duffy	Marvel Comics	Adaptation of the eponymous film, also published in its entirety as Marvel Graphic Novel #35.	No
Winchester '73	Cowboy Western Comics #29	1 issue	One-shot	October 1950	?	Charlton Comics	Adaptation of the eponymous film.	No
The Wings of Eagles	Four Color (series 2) #790	1 issue	One-shot	April 1957	?	Dell Comics	Adaptation of the eponymous film.	No
Winnie the Pooh	Walt Disney's Treasury of Classic Tales: Winnie the Pooh and the Honey Tree	13 installments	Newspaper strip	January 2 – March 27, 1966	Frank Reilly	King Features Syndicate	Adaptation of the first film; the artwork was done by John Ushler.	No
Winnie the Pooh	Walt Disney's Treasury of Classic Tales: Winnie the Pooh and the Blustery Day	9 installments	Newspaper strip	August 4 – September 29, 1968	Frank Reilly	King Features Syndicate	Adaptation of the second film; the artwork was once again done by John Ushler.	No
Winnie the Pooh	Walt Disney's Treasury of Classic Tales: Winnie the Pooh and Tigger Too	9 installments	Newspaper strip	October 5 – November 30, 1975	Frank Reilly	King Features Syndicate	Adaptation of the third film; the artwork was done by Mike Arens.	No
Winnie the Pooh	Winnie the Pooh	33 issues	Ongoing series	January 1977 – July 1984	Vic Lockman	Gold Key Comics		No
Witch Mountain	Walt Disney Showcase #29: "Escape to Witch Mountain"	1 issue	One-shot	Mary Virginia Carey	June 1975	Gold Key Comics	Adaptation of the first film.	No
Witch Mountain	Walt Disney Showcase #44: "Return from Witch Mountain"	1 issue	One-shot	Mary Virginia Carey	June 1978	Gold Key Comics	Adaptation of the second film.	No
Witchfinder General	Vincent Price Presents #20: "Witchfinder"	1 issue	Comic story	?	July 2010	TidalWave Productions		
The Wizard of Oz (1939)	MGM's Marvelous Wizard of Oz	1 issue	One-shot	Roy Thomas	1975	DC Comics, Marvel Comics	Adaptation overall of the 1939 film version based on the 1900 novel by L. Frank Baum; first co-publication between Marvel and DC.	No
The Wizard of Oz (1939)	Marvel Treasury of Oz: The Marvelous Land of Oz	1 issue	One-shot	Roy Thomas	1975	Marvel Comics	Adaptation of the 1904 novel by L. Frank Baum; continuation of the 1939 film adaptation reusing the likenesses of the actors portraying the characters from the film.	No
Wolf Call	Movie Comics #5	1 issue	Photo comics	?	August 1939	DC Comics	Condensed adaptation of the eponymous film.	No
The Wolf Man (1941)	Dell Movie Classics #12-922-308	1 issue	One-shot	Robert Bernstein	June–August 1963	Dell Comics	Original story based on the eponymous 1941 film, reprinted as #12-922-410 (August–October 1964).	No
WolfCop	WolfCop	3 issues	Limited series	Max Marks	2016	Dynamite Entertainment	Continuation of the eponymous film.	Paperback: 1-5241-1375-1/978-1-5241-1375-9
The Wonderful World of the Brothers Grimm	The Wonderful World of the Brothers Grimm	1 issue	One-shot	October 1962	?	Gold Key Comics	Adaptation of the eponymous film.	No
The Wonders of Aladdin	Four Color (series 2) #1255	1 issue	One-shot	1961	Paul S. Newman	Dell Comics	Adaptation of the eponymous film.	No
The World's Greatest Athlete	Walt Disney Showcase #14: "The World's Greatest Athlete"	1 issue	One-shot	Mary Virginia Carey	Gold Key Comics	April 1973	Adaptation of the eponymous film.	No

== X ==
Based on	Title	Length	Format	Publication date	Authors	Publisher	Notes	Collected editions
X: The Man with the X-ray Eyes	X: The Man with the X-ray Eyes	1 issue	One-shot	September 1963	Paul S. Newman	Gold Key Comics	Adaptation of the eponymous film.	No
Xanadu	Marvel Comics Super Special #17	1 issue	Magazine	Summer 1980	J. M. DeMatteis	Marvel Comics	Adaptation of the eponymous film.	No
The X-Files	The X-Files: Fight the Future	1 issue	One-shot	July 1998	John Rozum, John Van Fleet	Topps Comics	Adaptation of the eponymous film, itself based on the TV series.	No
X-Men	X-Men: The Movie Prequel: Wolverine	1 issue	One-shot	July 2000	Jay Faerber	Marvel Comics	Prequels to the first film.	X-Men: The Movie: Beginnings TP (0-7851-0750-9/978-0-7851-0750-7)
X-Men	X-Men: The Movie Prequel: Magneto	1 issue	One-shot	Joe Pruett	August 2000	Marvel Comics	Prequels to the first film.	X-Men: The Movie: Beginnings TP (0-7851-0750-9/978-0-7851-0750-7)
X-Men	X-Men: The Movie Prequel: Rogue	1 issue	One-shot	Dan Abnett, Andy Lanning	August 2000	Marvel Comics	Prequels to the first film.	X-Men: The Movie: Beginnings TP (0-7851-0750-9/978-0-7851-0750-7)
X-Men	X-Men: The Movie – The Official Comic Book Adaptation	1 issue	One-shot	Ralph Macchio	September 2000	Marvel Comics	Adaptation of the first film.	X-Men: The Movie TP (0-7851-0749-5/978-0-7851-0749-1)
X-Men	X-Men: The Movie: Wizards of the Coast Special Edition	1 issue	One-shot	Jay Faerber	2000	Marvel Comics	Wizards of the Coast tie-in; based on the first film.	No
X-Men	X-Men: The Movie iConnect Special	1 issue	One-shot	Scott Lobdell	January 2001	Marvel Comics	Promotional tie-in to iConnect; the main feature story, "A Rogue by Any Other Name", is set during the closing minutes of the film.	No
X-Men	X-Men 2 Movie Prequel: Nightcrawler	1 issue	One-shot	Chuck Austen	May 2003	Marvel Comics	Prequels to the second film.	X-Men 2: Official Movie Comic Book Adaptation TP (0-7851-1162-X/978-0-7851-1162-7)
X-Men	X-Men 2 Movie Prequel: Wolverine	1 issue	One-shot	Brian Vaughan	May 2003	Marvel Comics	Prequels to the second film.	X-Men 2: Official Movie Comic Book Adaptation TP (0-7851-1162-X/978-0-7851-1162-7)
X-Men	X-Men 2: Official Movie Comic Book Adaptation	1 issue	One-shot	Chuck Austen	June 2003	Marvel Comics	Adaptation of the second film.	X-Men 2: Official Movie Comic Book Adaptation TP (0-7851-1162-X/978-0-7851-1162-7)

== Y ==
Based on	Title	Length	Format	Publication date	Authors	Publisher	Notes	Collected editions
Yellow Submarine	Beatles – Yellow Submarine	1 issue	One-shot	February 1969	Paul S. Newman	Gold Key Comics	Adaptation of the eponymous film.	No
Yellowstone Kelly	Four Color (series 2) #1056	1 issue	One-shot	October–December 1959	Eric Freiwald, Robert Schaefer	Dell Comics	Adaptation of the eponymous film.	No
Your Highness	Your Highness: Knight and Dazed	1 issue	Graphic novel	March 2011	Danny McBride, Jeff Fradley	Dark Horse Comics	Prequel to the eponymous film.	Paperback: 978-1-59582-620-6

== Z ==
Based on	Title	Length	Format	Publication date	Authors	Publisher	Notes	Collected editions
Zulu	Dell Movie Classics #12-950-410	1 issue	One-shot	August–October 1964	Paul S. Newman	Dell Comics	Adaptation of the eponymous film.	No

== See also ==
- Lists of comics based on media
  - List of comics based on fiction
  - List of comics based on television programs
  - List of comics based on unproduced film projects
  - List of comics based on video games
- Lists of media based on comics
  - List of films based on comics
  - List of novels based on comics
  - List of video games based on comics
  - List of television programs based on comics
- Lists of films based on media
  - Lists of works of fiction made into feature films
  - List of short fiction made into feature films
  - List of films based on poems
  - List of films based on comic strips
  - List of films based on manga
  - List of films based on magazine articles
  - List of films based on toys
  - List of films based on video games
  - List of films based on television programs
  - List of films based on film books
  - List of live-action films based on cartoons and comics
- Lists of media based on films
  - List of films adapted into novels
  - List of video games based on films
  - List of television programs based on films
