= List of comics based on video games =

The following is a list of various comics, graphic novels, webcomics, comic strips and manga based on video games.

== A ==
Based on	Title	Length	Format	Publication date	Authors	Publisher	Notes	Collected editions
The Adventures of Bayou Billy	The Adventures of Bayou Billy	5 issues	Miniseries	1989–1990	Rich Margopoulos, Amanda Conner	Archie Comics	First video game comic published by Archie Comics.	
Alice in the Country of Hearts	Alice in the Country of Hearts (ハートの国のアリス～Wonderful Wonder World～)	36 chapters	Serialized manga	2008–2010	QuinRose, Soumei Hoshino	Mag Garden	Serialized in Monthly Comic Avarus.	Collected in 6 tankōbon volumes.
Alice in the Country of Hearts	Alice in the Country of Hearts: My Fanatic Rabbit (ハートの国のアリス - My Fanatic Rabbit -)	12 chapters	Serialized manga	2009–2011	QuinRose, Psyche Delico	Mag Garden	Serialized in Monthly Comic Avarus.	Collected in 2 tankōbon volumes.
Alice in the Country of Hearts	Alice in the Country of Joker: Circus and Liar's Game (ジョーカーの国のアリス ～サーカスと嘘つきゲーム～)	39 chapters	Serialized manga	2011–2013	QuinRose, Mamenosuke Fujimaru	Ichijinsha	Serialized in Monthly Comic Zero Sum.	Collected in 7 tankōbon volumes.
America's Army	America's Army	16 chapters	Digital comics	2013–2015		IDW Publishing	Digital comics, originally available to read on the series' website.	
Among Us	Among Us (アモングアス)	1 chapter	One-shot manga	2022	Berabou	Shogakukan	Published in Bessatsu CoroCoro Comic.	
ArchLord	ArchLord	46 chapters	Manhwa	2005–2008	Park Jin-hwan	Daewon C.I.		Collected in 6 volumes.
Army of Two	Army of Two: Dirty Money	1 volume	Graphic novel	2008	John Ney Rieber	Prima Games	Bundled with the strategy guide for the 2008 video game Army of Two.	Paperback: 978-0761557449
Army of Two	Army of Two	6 issues	Miniseries	2010	Peter Milligan, Dexter Soy	IDW Publishing		Paperback: 978-1600107399
Assassin's Creed	Assassin's Creed	1 issue	Minicomic	2007	Corey May, David Levy, Thierry Doizon	Ubisoft	Included in the Limited Edition of the 2007 video game Assassin's Creed.	
Assassin's Creed	Assassin's Creed	1 chapter	Webcomic	2007	Jerry Holkins, Mike Krahulik	Penny Arcade	Included as a pre-order bonus of the Limited Edition steelbox of the 2007 video game Assassin's Creed.	
Assassin's Creed	Assassin's Creed	6 volumes	Bande dessinée	2009–2014	Éric Corbeyran, Djilalli Defali	Les Deux Royaumes		The Ankh of Isis Trilogy (Vol. 1–3) TP: 978-1781163436; The Hawk Trilogy (Vol. 4–6) TP: 978-1785653889
Assassin's Creed	Assassin's Creed: The Fall	3 issues	Miniseries	2010–2011	Karl Kerschl, Cameron Stewart	DC Comics		The Fall & The Chain: 978-1787731509
Assassin's Creed	Assassin's Creed: The Chain	1 volume	Graphic novel	2012	Karl Kerschl, Cameron Stewart	UbiWorkshop		The Fall & The Chain: 978-1787731509
Assassin's Creed	Assassin's Creed: Awakening	12 chapters	Serialized manga	2013–2014	Yano Takashi, Ooiwa Kenji	Shueisha	Serialized in Jump X magazine. Later reprinted in English by Titan Comics in 6 issues.	Complete Collection: 978-1787730939
Assassin's Creed	Assassin's Creed: Brahman	1 volume	Graphic novel	2013	Karl Kerschl, Cameron Stewart	UbiWorkshop		Paperback: 978-2924006085
Assassin's Creed	Assassin's Creed	14 issues	Ongoing series	2015–2016	Anthony Del Col, Conor McCreery, Neil Edwards	Titan Comics	Also known as Assassin's Creed: Assassins.	Vol. 1: 978-1782763055; Vol. 2: 978-1782763062; Vol. 3: 978-1782763109
Assassin's Creed	Assassin's Creed: Templars	9 issues	Ongoing series	2016–2017	Fred Van Lente, Dennis Calero	Titan Comics		Vol. 1: 978-1782763116; Vol. 2: 978-1782763123
Assassin's Creed	Assassin's Creed: Last Descendants – Locus	4 issues	Miniseries	2016	Ian Edginton, Caspar Wijngaard	Titan Comics		Paperback: 978-1782763130
Assassin's Creed	Assassin's Creed: Conspiracies	2 volumes	Graphic novel	2016–2017	Guillaume Dorison	Les Deux Royaumes		The Complete Collection: 978-1785867194
Assassin's Creed	Assassin's Creed: Uprising	12 issues	Ongoing series	2017–2018	Dan Watters, Alex Paknadel, José Holder	Titan Comics		Vol. 1: 978-1782763079; Vol. 2: 978-1782763093; Vol. 3: 978-1785867941
Assassin's Creed	Assassin's Creed: Reflections	4 issues	Miniseries	2017	Ian Edginton, Valeria Favoccia	Titan Comics		Paperback: 978-1782763147
Assassin's Creed	Assassin's Creed: Origins	4 issues	Miniseries	2018	Anne Toole, Anthony Del Col, PJ Kaiowá	Titan Comics		Paperback: 978-1782763086
Assassin's Creed	Assassin's Creed: Bloodstone	2 volumes	Graphic novel	2019	Guillaume Dorison	Les Deux Royaumes		Hardcover: 978-1787734609
Assassin's Creed	Assassin's Creed: Blade of Shao Jun (アサシン クリード チャイナ)	18 chapters	Serialized manga	2019–2021	Kurata Minoji	Shogakukan	Serialized in Monthly Sunday Gene-X magazine. Known in Japan as Assassin's Creed: China (アサシン クリード チャイナ, Asashin Kurīdo Chaina).	List of trade paperbacks: * Vol. 1: 978-1974721238; Vol. 2: 978-1974721245; Vol. 3: 978-1974726516; Vol. 4: 978-1974732227
Assassin's Creed	Assassin's Creed: Dynasty	43 chapters	Serialized manhua	2020–2022	Xu Xianzhe, Zhang Xiao	Tencent	Serialized on AC.QQ website.	List of trade paperbacks: * Vol. 1: 978-1427868824; Vol. 2: 978-1427868862; Vol. 3: 978-1427869043; Vol. 4: 978-1427869203; Vol. 5: 978-1427871510
Assassin's Creed	Assassin's Creed Valhalla × Vinland Saga (『アサシンクリード ヴァルハラ』×『ヴィンランド・サガ)	1 chapter	One-shot manga	2020	Makoto Yukimura	Kodansha	Published in Monthly Afternoon magazine. Crossover story with the manga Vinland Saga.	
Assassin's Creed	Assassin's Creed: Valhalla – Song of Glory	3 issues	Miniseries	2020	Cavan Scott, Martín Túnica	Dark Horse Comics		Hardcover: 978-1506719290
Assassin's Creed	Assassin's Creed: Valhalla – Blood Brothers	5 chapters	Serialized manhua	2020–2021	Feng Zisu	Tencent	Serialized on AC.QQ website.	Paperback: 978-1427869036
Assassin's Creed	Assassin's Creed: Valhalla	8 pages	Digital comic	2020	Mathieu Gabella, Paolo Traisci, Fabien Alquier	Glénat Editions; Ubisoft	French digital comic published on Ubisoft's website.	
Assassin's Creed	Assassin's Creed: Valhalla – Forgotten Myths	3 issues	Miniseries	2022	Alex Freed, Martín Túnica	Dark Horse Comics		Hardcover: 978-1506729756
Assassin's Creed	Assassin's Creed: Valhalla – The Hidden Codex	1 volume	Bande dessinée	2023	Mathieu Gabella, Paolo Traisci, Fabien Alquier	Glénat Editions	French bande dessinée graphic novel. Published in English by Dark Horse Comics.	Hardcover: 978-1506739908
Assassin's Creed	Assassin's Creed: Forgotten Temple	151 chapters	Webtoon	2023–2026	ARC, Tabii	Webtoon Entertainment	Serialized on the Webtoon platform.	
Assassin's Creed	Assassin's Creed: Mirage – A Soar of Eagles	3 issues	Miniseries	2025	Michael Avon Oeming, Mirko Colak	Dark Horse Comics		
Assassin's Creed	Assassin's Creed: Shadows – Tales of Iga (アサシン クリード シャドウズ 伊賀の物語)	30 chapters	Serialized manga	2025–2026	Legge	Kodansha	Serialized in YanMaga Web.	
Avengers Alliance	Avengers Alliance	4 issues	Miniseries	2016	Fabian Nicieza	Marvel Comics		
Atari	Atari Force	5 issues	Minicomics	1982–1983	Gerry Conway, Roy Thomas	DC Comics	Packaged with select Atari 2600 video games.	A trade paperback was solicited by Dynamite Entertainment but was never published.
Atari	Atari Force	21 issues	Ongoing series	1983–1986		DC Comics	One issue is a Special.	A trade paperback was solicited by Dynamite Entertainment but was never published.

== B ==
Based on	Title	Length	Format	Publication date	Authors	Publisher	Notes	Collected editions
Baldur's Gate	Baldur's Gate	1 issue	One-shot comic	1998	Lukas Kristjanson, James Ohlen, John Gallagher	Interplay	Promotional comic.	
Batman: Arkham	Batman: Arkham Asylum: The Road to Arkham	1 issue	One-shot comic	2009	Alan Burnett, Carlos D'Anda	DC Comics	Available as an Amazon pre-order incentive for the Collector's Edition of the 2009 video game Batman: Arkham Asylum.	The Arkham Saga Omnibus: 978-1779529503
Batman: Arkham	Batman: Arkham City	7 chapters	Miniseries	2011	Derek Fridolfs	DC Comics	Later published in print in the miniseries of the same name.	The Arkham Saga Omnibus: 978-1779529503
Batman: Arkham	Batman: Arkham City	5 issues	Miniseries	2011	Paul Dini, Carlos D'Anda	DC Comics	Originally announced as a six-issue series.	The Arkham Saga Omnibus: 978-1779529503
Batman: Arkham	Batman: Arkham Unhinged	58 chapters	Ongoing series	2011–2013	Derek Fridolds, Karen Traviss	DC Comics	Digital-first comics. Later published in print in 20 issues.	The Arkham Saga Omnibus: 978-1779529503
Batman: Arkham	Batman: Arkham City: End Game	6 chapters	Miniseries	2012	Derek Fridolfs, Jason Shawn Alexander	DC Comics	Digital-first comics. Later published in print as a one-shot.	The Arkham Saga Omnibus: 978-1779529503
Batman: Arkham	Batman: Arkham Origins	14 chapters	Miniseries	2013–2014		DC Comics	Digital-first comics.	The Arkham Saga Omnibus: 978-1779529503
Batman: Arkham	Batman: Arkham Knight	39 chapters	Ongoing series	2015	Peter J. Tomasi, Viktor Bogdanovic	DC Comics	Digital-first comics. Later published in print in 12 issues, an Annual and a Robin Special. A #0 issue was included in the Limited Edition and Batmobile Edition of the PlayStation 4 version of the 2015 video game Batman: Arkham Knight.	The Arkham Saga Omnibus: 978-1779529503
Batman: Arkham	Batman: Arkham Knight: Batgirl Begins	1 issue	One-shot	2015	Tim Seeley, Matthew Clark	DC Comics	Comic given away at the 2015 San Diego Comic-Con.	The Arkham Saga Omnibus: 978-1779529503
Batman: Arkham	Batman: Arkham Knight: Batgirl & Harley Quinn	2 chapters	Miniseries	2016	Tim Seeley, Matthew Clawk	DC Comics	Digital-first comics. Later published in print as a one-shot.	The Arkham Saga Omnibus: 978-1779529503
Batman: Arkham	Batman: Arkham Knight: Genesis	6 issues	Miniseries	2015–2016	Peter J. Tomasi	DC Comics		The Arkham Saga Omnibus: 978-1779529503
Bionic Commando	Bionic Commando: Chain of Command	1 chapter	Webcomic	2008	Andy Diggle, Colin Wilson	Capcom	A print edition was given as a pre-order incentive for the 2009 video game Bionic Commando.	
Bloodborne	Bloodborne	16 issues	Ongoing series	2018–2019	Ales Kot, Piotr Kowalski, Brad Simpson	Titan Comics	The comic was solicited as a limited series but became an ongoing series after the first 4 issues were published.	List of volumes: * Vol. 1: 978-1785863448; Vol. 2: 978-1785866029; Vol. 3: 978-1787730144; Vol. 4: 978-1787730151
Bloodborne	Bloodborne: The Lady of the Lanterns	4 issues	Miniseries	2022–2023	Cullen Bunn, Piotr Kowalski, Brad Simpson	Titan Comics	A Free Comic Book Day 2022 issue was published recapping the previous series.	Paperback: 978-1787735996
Bloodborne	Bloodborne: The Bleak Dominion	4 issues	Miniseries	2023–2024	Cullen Bunn, Piotr Kowalski, Brad Simpson	Titan Comics		
BloodRayne	BloodRayne: Skies Afire	1 issue	One-shot comic	2004	Jeffery Stevenson, Steven O'Connell, Romano Molenaar	Digital Webbing		
BloodRayne	BloodRayne: Seeds of Sin	1 issue	One-shot comic	2005	Christina Z, Cedric Nocon	Digital Webbing		
BloodRayne	BloodRayne: Lycan Rex	1 issue	One-shot comic	2005	Troy Wall, Mark Robinson	Digital Webbing		
BloodRayne	BloodRayne: Dark Soul	1 issue	One-shot comic	2005	Steven O'Connell, Rob Delatorre	Digital Webbing		
BloodRayne	BloodRayne: Twin Blades	1 issue	One-shot comic	2006	Steven O'Connell, Steve Scott	Digital Webbing		
BloodRayne	BloodRayne: Plague of Dreams	3 issues	Miniseries	2006–2007	Troy Wall, Mark Robinson	Digital Webbing		
BloodRayne	BloodRayne: Tibetan Heights	1 issue	One-shot comic	2007	Troy Wall, Chad Hardin	Digital Webbing		
BloodRayne	BloodRayne: Red Blood Run	3 issues	Miniseries	2007	Troy Wall, Mario Guevara	Digital Webbing		
BloodRayne	BloodRayne: Automaton	1 issue	One-shot comic	2008	Kevin Melrose, Troy Wall, Andre Coelho	Digital Webbing		
BloodRayne	BloodRayne: Prime Cuts	4 issues	Minisereis	2008–2009	Chad Lambert	Digital Webbing		
BloodRayne	BloodRayne: Tokyo Rogue	3 issues	Miniseries	2008	Troy Wall, Jake Bilbao	Digital Webbing		
BloodRayne	BloodRayne: Revenge of the Butcheress	1 issue	One-shot comic	2009	Chad Lambert, David Miller	Digital Webbing		
Borderlands	Borderlands: Origins	4 issues	Miniseries	2012–2013	Mike Neumann, Agustín Padilla, Esther Sanz	IDW Publishing		Paperback: 978-1613776018
Borderlands	Borderlands: The Fall of Fyrestone	4 issues	Miniseries	2014	Mike Neumann, Agustín Padilla, Esther Sanz	IDW Publishing		Paperback: 978-1631401954
Borderlands	Borderlands: Tannis and the Vault	4 issues	Miniseries	2014–2015	Mike Neumann, Agustín Padilla, Esther Sanz	IDW Publishing		Paperback: 978-1631402715
Borderlands	Borderlands: Moxxi's Mysterious Memento	4 issues	Miniseries	2024–2025	Amy Chu, Mike Norton	Dark Horse Comics		Paperback: 978-1506745350
Bully	Bully	1 issue	Minicomic	2006		Rockstar Comics	Included in the Collector's Edition of the PlayStation 2 version of the 2006 video game Bully.	

== C ==
Based on	Title	Length	Format	Publication date	Authors	Publisher	Notes	Collected editions
Call of Duty	Modern Warfare 2: Ghost	6 issues	Miniseries	2009–2010	David Lapham, Kevin West	WildStorm		Paperback: 978-1401228149
Call of Duty	Call of Duty: Black Ops III	6 issues	Miniseries	2015–2016	Larry Hama, Marcelo Ferreira, Dan Jackson	Dark Horse Comics		Paperback: 978-1616559663
Call of Duty	Call of Duty: Zombies	6 issues	Miniseries	2016–2017	Jason Blundell, Craig Houston, Justin Jordan, Jonathan Wayshak	Dark Horse Comics		Paperback: 978-1506703053
Call of Duty	Call of Duty: Zombies 2	4 issues	Miniseries	2018–2019	Jason Blundell, Craig Houston, Justin Jordan, Andres Ponce	Dark Horse Comics		Paperback: 978-1506710051
Call of Duty	Call of Duty: Black Ops 4	10 chapters	Miniseries	2018		Treyarch	Digital comics.	
Call of Duty	Call of Duty: Vanguard	6 chapters	Miniseries	2021–2022	Sam Maggs, Piotr Kowalski, Brad Simpson	Sledgehammer Games	Digital comics. A print version of issue #1 was given to attendees of the 2021 New York Comic Con.	
Capcom	Capcom Summer Special 2004	1 issue	One-shot	2004		Udon Comics	Given away at the 2004 San Diego Comic-Con.	
Captain Commando	Captain Commando: The Greatest Hero of All Time (キャプテンコマンドー)	23 chapters	Serialized manga	1994–1995	Kenkou Tabuchi, Kotomi Tobashi			Vol. 1: 978-1926778402; Vol. 2: 978-1926778419
Castlevania	Dracula X ~Nocturne in the Moonlight~	1 chapter		1997	Ayami Kojima	Konami	Included in an artbook released in Japan with the 1997 video game Castlevania: Symphony of the Night.	
Castlevania	Castlevania: The Belmont Legacy	5 issues	Miniseries	2005	Marc Andreyko, E. J. Su	IDW Publishing		Paperback: 978-1933239194
Castlevania	Castlevania: Curse of Darkness (悪魔城ドラキュラ 闇の呪印)	2 volumes	Manga	2005–2006	Kou Sasakura	Media Factory		Vol. 1: 978-1427800534; Vol. 2: 978-1427802149
Castlevania	Akumajō Dracula: Yami no Juin - Fukushū no Jokyoku (悪魔城ドラキュラ 闇の呪印 -復讐の序曲-)	1 chapter	Minicomic	2005	Ayami Kojima	Konami	Pre-order bonus for the Japanese PlayStation 2 version of the 2005 video game Castlevania: Curse of Darkness.	
Castlevania	Akumajō Dracula: Lament of Innocence (悪魔城ドラキュラ ラメント オブ イノセンス)	42 chapters	Webmanga	2007–2008	Yumi Akitsuki	Oedipus-Complex		
Centipede	Centipede	1 issue	Minicomic	1983	Howard Post, Andrew Gutelle	DC Comics	Included in the Atari 2600 release of the 1981 video game Centipede.	
Centipede	Centipede	5 issues	Miniseries	2017	Max Bemis, Eoin Marron	Dynamite Entertainment		Paperback: 978-1524105860
The Cheetahmen	The Cheetahmen	1 issue	Minicomic	1991	Joe Martinez	Active Enterprises	Included in the NES release of the 1991 video game Action 52.	
Contra	Contra: The Comic	1 issue	One-shot	2002	Nobuya Nakazato, Atsushi Tsujimoto	Konami	Promotional comic distributed alongside the release of the 2002 video game Contra: Shattered Soldier.	
Crash Bandicoot	Crash Bandicoot (クラッシュバンディクー)	2 chapters	Serialized manga	1996–1997	Takahiro Yamashita	Shogakukan	Published in Bessatsu CoroCoro Comic magazine.	
Crash Bandicoot	Crash Bandicoot: Dansu! de Jump! na Daibouken (クラッシュバンデダンス!でジャンプ!な大冒険)	14 chapters	Serialized manga	1997–1999	Ari Kawashima	Shogakukan	Published in CoroCoro Comic magazine.	Collected in 2 tankōbon volumes.
Crash Bandicoot	Crash Bandicoot: Kattobi! Spin World (クラッシュバンディクー かっとび!スピンワールド)		Serialized manga	1999–2004	Hideki Goto	Shogakukan	First published in CoroCoro Comic, then moved to Bessatsu CoroCoro Comic.	
Custom Robo	Custom Robo	3 issues	Miniseries	2004		Dreamwave Productions	Serialized in Nintendo Power.	
Crysis	Crysis	6 issues	Miniseries	2011	Richard K. Morgan, Peter Bergting	IDW Publishing		Paperback: 978-1613771198
Cyberpunk 2077	Cyberpunk 2077: Trauma Team	4 issues	Miniseries	2020	Cullen Bunn, Miguel Valderrama	Dark Horse Comics		Paperback: 978-1506716015
Cyberpunk 2077	Cyberpunk 2077: You Have My Word	4 issues	Miniseries	2021–2022	Bartosz Sztybor, Jesús Hervas	Dark Horse Comics		Paperback: 978-1506725666
Cyberpunk 2077	Cyberpunk 2077: Your Voice	1 volume	Graphic novel	2021	Aleksandra Motyka, Marcin Blancha, Danijel Zezelj	Dark Horse Comics		Paperback: 978-1506726236
Cyberpunk 2077	Cyberpunk 2077: Where's Johnny	1 volume	Graphic novel	2021	Bartosz Sztybor, Giannis Milonogiannis	Dark Horse Comics		Hardcover: 978-1506726250
Cyberpunk 2077	Cyberpunk 2077: Big City Dreams	1 volume	Graphic novel	2022	Bartosz Sztybor, Filipe Andrade, Alessio Fioriniello	Dark Horse Comics		Hardcover: 978-1506726861
Cyberpunk 2077	Cyberpunk 2077: Blackout	4 issues	Miniseries	2022	Bartosz Sztybor, Roberto Ricci	Dark Horse Comics		Paperback: 978-1506726274
Cyberpunk 2077	Cyberpunk 2077: XOXO	4 issues	Miniseries	2023–2024	Bartosz Sztybor, Jakub Rebelka	Dark Horse Comics		Paperback: 978-1506726830
Cyberpunk 2077	Cyberpunk 2077: Kickdown	4 issues	Miniseries	2024	Tomasz Marchewka, Jake Elphick, Tommaso Bennato	Dark Horse Comics		Paperback: 978-1506726847
Cyberpunk 2077	Cyberpunk 2077: Psycho Squad	4 issues	Miniseries	2025	Dan Watters, Kieran McKeown	Dark Horse Comics		Paperback: 978-1506726854

== D ==
Based on	Title	Length	Format	Publication date	Authors	Publisher	Notes	Collected editions
Dante's Inferno	Dante's Inferno	6 issues	mini-series	2010	Christos Gage, Diego Latorre	DC Comics		
Dark Souls	Dark Souls II: Into the Light	1 chapter	Digital comic	2014	Rob Williams, Andi Ewington, Simon Coleby	Bandai Namco Games	Digital promotional comic. According to Bandai Namco, a print version was created "for certain editions of the game in certain countries".	
Dark Souls	Dark Souls: The Breath of Andolus	4 issues	Miniseries	2016	George Mann, Alan Quah	Titan Comics		Complete Collection: 978-1787737273
Dark Souls	Dark Souls: Legends of the Flame	2 issues	Miniseries	2016		Titan Comics		Complete Collection: 978-1787737273
Dark Souls	Dark Souls: Winter's Spite	4 issues	Miniseries	2016–2017	George Mann, Alan Quah	Titan Comics		Complete Collection: 978-1787737273
Dark Souls	Dark Souls: Tales of Ember	2 issues	Miniseries	2017		Titan Comics		Complete Collection: 978-1787737273
Dark Souls	Dark Souls: The Age of Fire	4 issues	Miniseries	2018	Ryan O'Sullivan, Anton Kokarev	Titan Comics		Complete Collection: 978-1787737273
Dark Souls	Dark Souls: The Willow King	4 issues	Miniseries	2024	George Mann	Titan Comics		Paperback: 978-1787731622
Darksiders	Darksiders II: Death's Door	5 issues	Miniseries	2012	Andrew Kreisberg, David Slagle, Roger Robinson	Dark Horse Books	Digital comics. An issue #0 was included in the Best Buy Limited Edition of Darksiders II.	Hardcover: 978-1616550264
Darkstalkers	Vampire Hunter: Darkstalkers' Revenge (ヴァンパイアハンター DARKSTALKERS' REVENGE)	6 chapters	Serialized manga	1995–1996	Run Ishida	Enterbrain	Published in Comic Beam magazine.	
Darkstalkers	Vampire Savior: Tamashii no Mayoigo (ヴァンパイアセイヴァー - 魂の迷い子)	24 chapters	Serialized manga	1997–2001	Mayumi Azura	Enix	Published in Gangan Wing magazine.	
Darkstalkers	Darkstalkers	7 issues	Miniseries	2004–2005	Ken Siu-Chong, Alvin Lee	UDON	A Free Comic Book Day 2005 issue was also published.	Hardcover: 978-1772941142
Darkstalkers	Darkstalkers: The Night Warriors	3 issues	Miniseries	2010	Ken Siu-Chong, Joe Vriens, Eric Vedder	UDON		Hardcover: 978-1772941142
Darkstalkers	Darkstalkers: Morrigan	1 issue	One-shot comic	2022	Ken Siu-Chong, Panzer	UDON		
Darkstalkers	Darkstalkers: Felicia	1 issue	One-shot comic	2023	Tim Seeley, Tovio Rogers	UDON		
Darkstalkers	Darkstalkers: Hsien-Ko	1 issue	One-shot comic	2023	Ken Siu-Chong, Tovio Rogers	UDON		
Darkstalkers	Darkstalkers: Jedah	1 issue	One-shot comic	2024	Tim Seeley, Alberto Albuquerque	UDON		
Darkstalkers	Team Darkstalkers	1 issue	One-shot comic	2024	Tim Seeley, Alberto Albuquerque	UDON		
DC Universe Online	DC Universe Online	1 issue	One-shot comic	2010	Tony Bedard, Adriana Melo, Daniel HDR	DC Comics	Included in the Collector's Edition of the 2011 video game DC Universe Online.	
DC Universe Online	DC Universe Online: Legends	27 issues	Ongoing series	2011–2012	Marv Wolfman, Howard Porter, John Livesay	DC Comics		Vol. 1: 978-1401232184; Vol. 2: 978-1401233860; Vol. 3: 978-1401234737
Dead Space	Dead Space	7 issue	Miniseries	2008	Antony Johnston, Ben Templesmith	Image Comics		Paperback: 978-1787745384
Dead Space	Dead Space: Extraction	1 issue	One-shot comic	2009	Antony Johnston, Ben Templesmith	Image Comics		Paperback: 978-1787745384
Dead Space	Dead Space: Salvage	1 volume	Graphic novel	2010	Antony Johnston, Christopher Shy	IDW Publishing		
Dead Space	Dead Space: Liberation	1 volume	Graphic novel	2013	Ian Edginton, Christopher Shy	Titan Comics		
Defenders of Dynatron City	Defenders of Dynatron City	6 issues	Miniseries	1992	Steve Purcell, Frank Cirocco	Marvel Comics		
Deus Ex	Deus Ex: Human Revolution	6 issues	Miniseries	2011	Robbie Morrison, Trevor Hairsine	DC Comics		
Deus Ex	Deus Ex Universe: Children's Crusade	5 issues	Miniseries	2016	Alex Irvine, John Aggs	Titan Comics		Paperback: 978-1785851810
Deus Ex	Deus Ex: The Dawning Darkness	1 issue	One-shot comic	2016	Alex Irvine, John Aggs	Titan Comics	Included as a pre-order bonus for the 2016 video game Deus Ex: Mankind Divided.	
Detroit: Become Human	Detroit: Become Human Tokyo Stories	Ongoing	Serialized manga	2024	Kazami Sawatari, Moto Sumida	Kadokawa		
Devil May Cry	Devil May Cry	3 issues	Miniseries	2004	James McDonough, Adam Patyk, Pat Lee	Dreamwave Productions	Company went bankrupt before final issue and TPB were released.	
Devil May Cry	Devil May Cry 3 (デビル メイ クライ 3)	9 chapters	Manga	2005	Suguro Chayamachi			Vol. 1: 978-1598160314; Vol. 2: 978-1598165586
Devil May Cry	DmC Devil May Cry: The Chronicles of Vergil	2 issues	Miniseries	2013	Guillaume Dorison, Robin Recht, Patrick Pion	Titan Comics	Digital-first comics.	
Devil May Cry	Devil May Cry 5: Visions of V	38 chapters	Webtoon	2019–2022	Tomio Ogata	LINE		List of volumes: * Vol. 1: 978-4909767967; Vol. 2: 978-4866970714; Vol. 3: 978-4866971520; Vol. 4: 978-4866972589; Vol. 5: 978-4866972718
Dino Crisis	Dino Crisis (恐龍危機)	6 issues	Manhua	2000	Tony Wong	Jade Dynasty Group Ltd		
Dishonored	Dishonored	4 issues	Miniseries	2016	Gordon Rennie, Andrea Olimpieri	Titan Comics		Paperback: 978-1785852336
Dishonored	Dishonored: The Peeress and the Price	2 issues	Miniseries	2017	Michael Moreci, Andrea Olimpieri	Titan Comics		Paperback: 978-1785852343
DOOM	Doom	1 issue	One-shot comic	1996	Steve Behling, Michael Stewart, Tom Grindberg	GT Interactive Software		
Double Dragon	Double Dragon	6 issues	Miniseries	1991	Dwayne McDuffie	Marvel Comics		
Dragon Age	Dragon Age: Origins	1 chapter	Webcomic	2009	Penny Arcade	Penny Arcade		
Dragon Age	Dragon Age: Origins – Awakening	1 chapter	Webcomic	2010	Penny Arcade	Penny Arcade		
Dragon Age	Dragon Age: The Revelation	1 chapter	Webcomic	2010	David Gaider, Irma Ahmed	BioWare	Published on BioWare's blog.	
Dragon Age	Dragon Age	6 issues	Miniseries	2010	Orson Scott Card, Aaron Johnston, Mark Robinson, Anthony J. Tan	IDW Publishing		
Dragon Age	Dragon Age II	1 chapter	Webcomic	2011	Penny Arcade	BioWare	Published on the Dragon Age II official website.	
Dragon Age	Hindsight	1 chapter	Motion comic	2011	Penny Arcade	BioWare	Published on the Dragon Age II official website.	
Dragon Age	Dragon Age: The Silent Grove	6 issues	Miniseries	2012	David Gaider, Alex Freed, Chad Hardin	Dark Horse Comics	Digital comics.	The First Five Graphic Novels: 978-1506719177
Dragon Age	Dragon Age: Those Who Speak	3 issues	Miniseries	2012	David Gaider, Alex Freed, Chad Hardin	Dark Horse Comics		The First Five Graphic Novels: 978-1506719177
Dragon Age	Dragon Age: Until We Sleep	3 issues	Miniseries	2013	David Gaider, Alex Freed, Chad Hardin	Dark Horse Comics		The First Five Graphic Novels: 978-1506719177
Dragon Age	Dragon Age: Magekiller	5 issues	Miniseries	2015–2016	Greg Rucka, Carmen Carnero, Sachin Teng	Dark Horse Comics		The First Five Graphic Novels: 978-1506719177
Dragon Age	Dragon Age: Knight Errant	5 issues	Miniseries	2017	Nunzio DeFilippis, Christina Weir, Fernando Heinz Furukawa, Saching Teng	Dark Horse Comics		The First Five Graphic Novels: 978-1506719177
Dragon Age	Dragon Age: Deception	3 issues	Miniseries	2016	Nunzio DeFilippis, Christina Weir, Fernando Heinz Furukawa, Saching Teng	Dark Horse Comics		Wraiths of Tevinter: 978-1506708294
Dragon Age	Dragon Age: Blue Wraith	3 issues	Miniseries	2020	Nunzio DeFilippis, Christina Weir, Fernando Heinz Furukawa, Saching Teng	Dark Horse Comics		Wraiths of Tevinter: 978-1506708294
Dragon Age	Dragon Age: Dark Fortress	3 issues	Miniseries	2021	Nunzio DeFilippis, Christina Weir, Fernando Heinz Furukawa, Saching Teng	Dark Horse Comics		Wraiths of Tevinter: 978-1506708294
Dragon Age	Dragon Age: The Missing	4 issues	Miniseries	2023	George Mann	Dark Horse Comics		Paperback: 978-1506732800
Dragon Quest	Dragon Quest: The Adventure of Dai (DRAGON QUEST -ダイの大冒険-)	349 chapters	Serialized manga	1989–1996	Riku Sanjō, Koji Inada	Shueisha	Published in Weekly Shōnen Jump magazine.	Collected in 37 tankōbon volumes.
Dragon's Lair	Dragon's Lair	3 issues	Miniseries	2003	Andy Mangels, Fabio Laguna	CrossGen	Originally intended to be a six-issue series.	
Duel Masters	Duel Masters	8 issues	Ongoing series	2003-2004	Brian Augustyn	Dreamwave Productions		
Duke Nukem	Duke Nukem Forever	1 issue	One-shot comic	2011	Tom Waltz, Xermanico	IDW Publishing	Included in the Balls of Steel Edition of the 2011 video game Duke Nukem Forever.	
Duke Nukem	Duke Nukem: Glorious Bastard	4 issues	Miniseries	2011	Tom Waltz, Xermanico	IDW Publishing		

== E ==
Based on	Title	Length	Format	Publication date	Authors	Publisher	Notes	Collected editions
EverQuest	EverQuest: The Ruins of Kunark	1 issue	One-shot comic	2002	Brad McQuaid, Jim Lee	DC Comics		
EverQuest	EverQuest: Transformation	1 issue	One-shot comic	2002	Devin Grayson, Philip Tan	DC Comics		
Earthworm Jim	Earthworm Jim	3 issues	Ongoing series	1995–1996	Dan Slott	Marvel Comics		
Epic Mickey	Epic Mickey: The Graphic Novel	1 issue	One-shot comic	2012	Peter David, Fabio Celoni, Paolo Mottura	Disney		
Epic Mickey	Epic Mickey 2: The Power of Two Graphic Novel	1 issue	One-shot comic	2012	Peter David	Disney		

== F ==
Based on	Title	Length	Format	Publication date	Authors	Publisher	Notes	Collected editions
Fallout	Fallout: New Vegas – All Roads	1 volume	Graphic novel	2010	Chris Avellone	Dark Horse Books	Included in the Collector's Edition of the 2010 video game Fallout: New Vegas.	
Far Cry	Far Cry: Rite of Passage	3 issues	Miniseries	2021	Bryan Edward Hill	Dark Horse Books		
Final Fantasy	Final Fantasy	6 chapters	Manga	1989	Yuu Kaimeiji			
Final Fight	Final Fight Streetwise	1 issue	One-shot comic	2006	Dave Ralston, Gerado Sprigg, Trent Kaniuga	Capcom	Available as a pre-order incentive for the 2006 video game Final Fight: Streetwise.	
Fire Emblem	Fire Emblem: The Sacred Stones	five-page	Comic	2005	Ken Siu-Chong, Long Vo & Jeanie Lee	Gamepro.com	A joint effort of Nintendo, Udon, and Gamepro for the English release of The Sacred Stones.	
Five Nights at Freddy's	Main article: List of Five Nights at Freddy's media § Graphic novel adaptations							
Flashback	Flashback: The Quest for Identity	1 issue	Minicomic	1993	Jim Moore, Mike Harris, Frank Percy	Marvel Comics	Included in the manual of the Sega Genesis version of the 1992 video game Flashback.	
Fortnite	Batman/Fortnite: Foundation	1 issue	One-shot comic	2021	Scott Snyder, Christos Gage, Joshua Hixson	DC Comics		
Fortnite	Batman/Fortnite: Zero Point	6 issues	Limited series	2021	Christos Gage, Reilly Brown	DC Comics		
Fortnite	Fortnite x Marvel: Zero War	5 issues	Limited series	2022	Christos Gage, Donald Mustard	Marvel Comics		
Fortnite	Fortnite X Sonic the Hedgehog	1 issue	One-shot comic	2026	Evan Stanley, Miles Arq, Min Ho Kim, Tyler McGrath	Sega	Physical copies were distributed to attendees at the New York City stop of the Sonic Chaos Hunt before the comic was made available online.	

== G ==
Based on	Title	Length	Format	Publication date	Authors	Publisher	Notes	Collected editions
Gauntlet	Gauntlet: Darkness Calls	1 issue	One-shot comic	2014	Ron Marz, Stjepan Šejić	DC Comics	Available as a digital pre-order bonus for the 2014 video game Gauntlet. Printed copies were available to attendees of the Arrowhead Game Studios booth at various conventions.	
Gears of War	Gears of War	24 issues	Ongoing series	2008–2012	Joshua Ortega	WildStorm	A Sourcebook issue was also released.	Omnibus Vol. 1: 978-1684053520; Omnibus Vol. 2: 978-1684055753
Gears of War	Gears of War: The Rise of RAAM	4 issues	Miniseries	2018	Kurtis J. Wiebe, Max Dunbar	IDW Publishing		Paperback: 978-1684052387
Gears of War	Gears of War: Hivebusters	5 issues	Miniseries	2019–2020	Kurtis J. Wiebe, Alan Quah, Wagner Reis	IDW Publishing		Paperback: 978-1684054176
Ghosts 'n Goblins	Main article: Ghosts 'n Goblins § Comics and manga							
God of War	God of War	6 issues	Miniseries	2010–2011	Marv Wolfman, Andrea Sorrentino	WildStorm		Paperback: 978-1401229726
God of War	God of War	4 issues	Miniseries	2018–2019	Chris Roberson, Tony Parker	Dark Horse Comics	An issue #0 was included in the Collector's Edition of the 2018 video game God of War and collected in the trade paperback.	Paperback: 978-1506707464
God of War	God of War: Fallen God	4 issues	Miniseries	2021	Chris Roberson, Tony Parker	Dark Horse Comics		Paperback: 978-1506718729

== H ==
Based on	Title	Length	Format	Publication date	Authors	Publisher	Notes	Collected editions
Halo	The Halo Graphic Novel	1 volume	Graphic novel	2006		Marvel Comics		Hardcover: 978-0785123729; Paperback: 978-0785123781
Halo	Halo: Uprising	4 issues	Miniseries	2007–2009	Brian Michael Bendis, Alex Maleev	Marvel Comics		Paperback: 978-1506725895
Halo	Halo: Helljumper	5 issues	Miniseries	2009	Peter David, Eric Nguyen	Marvel Comics		Paperback: 978-1506725895
Halo	Halo: Blood Line	5 issues	Miniseries	2009–2010	Fred Van Lente	Marvel Comics		Paperback: 978-1506725895
Halo	Halo Wars: Genesis	1 volume	Graphic novel	2009	Phil Noto, Graeme Devine, Eric Nylund		Included in the Limited Edition of the 2009 video game Halo Wars.	
Halo	Halo: The Fall of Reach	12 issues	Miniseries	2010–2012	Felix Ruiz, Brian Reed	Marvel Comics	Comic book adaptation of the novel of the same name.	
Halo	Halo: Initiation	3 issues	Miniseries	2013	Brian Reed, Marco Castiello	Dark Horse Comics		Paperback: 978-1506729183
Halo	Halo: Escalation	24 issues	Miniseries	2013–2015	Christopher Schlerf, Brian Reed, Duffy Boudreau	Dark Horse Comics		Paperback: 978-1506729183
Halo	Halo: Tales from Slipspace	1 volume	Graphic novel	2016		Dark Horse Comics		Hardcover: 978-1506700724
Halo	Halo: Rise of Atriox	5 issues	Miniseries	2017–2018	Eric Nguyen, Jeremy Colwell, Aleksi Briclot	Dark Horse Comics		
Halo	Halo: Collateral Damage	3 issues	Miniseries	2018	Dave Crosland, Alex Irvine	Dark Horse Comics		
Halo	Halo: Lone Wolf	4 issues	Miniseries	2019	Anne Toole, Kieren McKewon	Dark Horse Comics		
Hellgate: London	Hellgate: London	4 issues	Miniseries	2007	Ian Edginton, Steve Pugh	Dark Horse Comics		Paperback: 978-1593076818
Hero Wars	Hero Wars: Keira – Raging Blades	4 chapters	Webtoon	2023–2024	Nexters	Nexters	Published on Webtoon.	
Hero Wars	Hero Wars: Lian – A Doll To Remember	1 chapter	Webtoon	2024	Nexters	Nexters	Japanese version available in the manga format, while the English version is adapted to the webtoon format.	
Hero Wars	Hero Wars: Celeste – Sporting Spirit	1 chapter	Webtoon	2024	Nexters	Nexters		
Hero Wars	Hero Wars: Tempus	1 chapter	Webtoon	2024	Nexters	Nexters		
Hotline Miami	Hotline Miami: Wildlife	8 issues	Miniseries	2016–2017	Maurizio Furini, Federico Chemello, Alberto Massaggia	Devolver Digital; Dayjob Studio	Digital comics.	Vol. 1: 978-1953414960; Vol. 2: 978-1953414953
Horizon Zero Dawn	Horizon Zero Dawn	9 issues	Miniseries	2020-2021	Anne Toole, Ben McCaw	Titan Comics		

== I ==
Based on	Title	Length	Format	Publication date	Authors	Publisher	Notes	Collected editions
Infamous	Infamous	6 issues	Miniseries	2011	William Harms, Eric Nguyen	DC Comics		Paperback: 978-1401233082
Indiana Jones and the Fate of Atlantis	Indiana Jones and the Fate of Atlantis	4 issues	Miniseries	1991	William Messner-Loebs	Dark Horse Comics		
Injustice: Gods Among Us	Injustice: Gods Among Us	37 chapters	Miniseries	2013–2014	Tom Taylor, Jheremy Rapack	DC Comics	Digital-first comics. Later printed in 13 issues.	Omnibus Vol. 1: 978-1401294984; Omnibus Vol. 2: 978-1779504685
Injustice: Gods Among Us	Injustice: Gods Among Us: Year Two	25 chapters	Miniseries	2014	Tom Taylor, Bruno Redondo	DC Comics	Digital-first comics. Later printed in 13 issues.	Omnibus Vol. 1: 978-1401294984; Omnibus Vol. 2: 978-1779504685
Injustice: Gods Among Us	Injustice: Gods Among Us: Year Three	25 chapters	Miniseries	2014–2015	Tom Taylor, Brian Buccellato, Bruno Redondo	DC Comics	Digital-first comics. Later printed as 13 issues.	Omnibus Vol. 1: 978-1401294984; Omnibus Vol. 2: 978-1779504685
Injustice: Gods Among Us	Injustice: Gods Among Us: Year Four	24 chapters	Miniseries	2015	Brian Buccellato, Bruno Redondo	DC Comics	Digital-first comics. Later printed in 13 issues.	Omnibus Vol. 1: 978-1401294984; Omnibus Vol. 2: 978-1779504685
Injustice: Gods Among Us	Injustice: Gods Among Us: Year Five	40 chapters	Miniseries	2015–2016	Brian Buccellato, Mike S. Miller	DC Comics	Digital-first comics. Later printed in 21 issues.	Omnibus Vol. 1: 978-1401294984; Omnibus Vol. 2: 978-1779504685
Injustice: Gods Among Us	Injustice: Ground Zero	24 chapters	Miniseries	2016–2017	Brian Buccellato, Chris Sebela	DC Comics	Digital-first comics. Later printed in 12 issues.	Omnibus Vol. 1: 978-1401294984; Omnibus Vol. 2: 978-1779504685
Injustice: Gods Among Us	Injustice 2	72 chapters	Miniseries	2017–2018	Tom Taylor, Bruno Redondo	DC Comics	Digital-first comics. Later printed in 38 issues.	Omnibus Vol. 1: 978-1401294984; Omnibus Vol. 2: 978-1779504685
Isle of the Dead	Isle of the Dead	1 issue	Minicomic	1993	Michael Steven Friedman	Rainmaker Software	Included with the 1993 MS-DOS video game Isle of the Dead.	

== J ==
Based on	Title	Length	Format	Publication date	Authors	Publisher	Notes	Collected editions
Justice League Heroes	Justice League Heroes: Falling Star	1 issue	One-shot comic	2006	Jim Krueger, Joe Ng	DC Comics		

== K ==
Based on	Title	Length	Format	Publication date	Authors	Publisher	Notes	Collected editions
Kane & Lynch	Kane & Lynch	6 issues	Miniseries	2010–2011	Ian Edginton, Chris Mitten	WildStorm		Paperback: 978-1401231583
Killer Instinct	Killer Instinct	3 issues	Miniseries	1996	Art Holcomb	Armada		
Killer Instinct	Killer Instinct Special	3 issues	Miniseries	1996	Art Holcomb	Acclaim Comics		
Killer Instinct	Killer Instinct	3 issues	Miniseries	2017–2018	Ian Edginton, Cam Adams	Dynamite Entertainment		Paperback: 978-1524106560
Kingdom Come: Deliverance	Kingdom Come: Deliverance	4 issues	Miniseries	2022	Brett Murphy, Wilson Gandolpho	Behemoth Comics; Sumerian Comics		Paperback: 978-1953414465
Kingdom Hearts	Kingdom Hearts (キングダムハーツ)	43 chapters	Serialized manga	2003–2005	Shiro Amano	Square Enix	Serialized in Monthly Shōnen Gangan.	Vol. 1: 978-0316254205; Vol. 2: 978-0316254212
Kingdom Hearts	Kingdom Hearts: Chain of Memories (キングダムハーツ チェインオブメモリーズ)	13 chapters	Serialized manga	2005–2006	Shiro Amano	Square Enix	Serialized in Monthly Shōnen Gangan.	Paperback: 978-0316255622
Kingdom Hearts	Kingdom Hearts II (キングダムハーツII)	69 chapters	Serialized manga	2006–2015	Shiro Amano	Square Enix	Serialized in Monthly Shōnen Gangan.	List of volumes: * Vol. 1: 978-0316401142; Vol. 2: 978-0316401159; Vol. 3: 978-0316288798; Vol. 4: 978-0316382724
Kingdom Hearts	Kingdom Hearts: Another Report (キングダムハーツ アナザーレポート)	1 chapter	One-shot manga	2007	Shiro Amano	Square Enix	Available as a pre-order bonus for the 2007 video game Kingdom Hearts II: Final Mix+.	
Kingdom Hearts	Kingdom Hearts: 358/2 Days (キングダム ハーツ 358/2 Days)	35 chapters	Serialized manga	2009–2012	Shiro Amano	Square Enix	Serialized in Monthly Shōnen Gangan.	List of volumes: * Vol. 1: 978-0316401180; Vol. 2: 978-0316401197; Vol. 3: 978-0316401203; Vol. 4: 978-0316286763; Vol. 5: 978-0316336260
Kingdom Hearts	Kingdom Hearts III (キングダムハーツIII)	Ongoing	Serialized manga	2019 –	Shiro Amano	Square Enix	Serialized in Monthly Shōnen Gangan.	
Kirby	Kirby of the Stars: The Story of Dedede Who Lives in Pupupu (星のカービィ デデデでプププなものがたり)	Ongoing	Serialized manga	1994–2006; 2017–	Hirokazu Hikawa	Shogakukan	First serialized in CoroCoro Comic magazine until November 2006; it restarted publishing in December 2017 in CoroCoro Aniki magazine.	

== L ==
Based on	Title	Length	Format	Publication date	Authors	Publisher	Notes	Collected editions
The Last of Us	The Last of Us: American Dreams	4 issues	Miniseries	2013	Neil Druckmann, Faith Erin Hicks	Dark Horse Comics		Paperback: 978-1616552121
Left 4 Dead	Left 4 Dead: The Sacrifice	1 chapter	Digital comic	2010	Chet Faliszek, Jay Pinkerton, Michael Avon Oeming	Valve	Published in four parts.	Valve Presents: The Sacrifice and Other Steam-Powered Stories: 978-1595828699
Legacy of Kain	Legacy of Kain: Soul Reaver	1 issue	Minicomic	1999	Matt Hawkins, David Boller, Matt Nelson	Top Cow Productions	Promotional comic.	
Legacy of Kain	Legacy of Kain: Defiance	1 issue	One-shot	2004	Scott Tucker, Tyler Kirkham, Tyson Wengler	Top Cow Productions		
The Legend of Zelda (list)	The Legend of Zelda (ゼルダの伝説, Zeruda no Densetsu)	1 volume	Manga	1986	Maru Ran	Wanpaku Comics		
The Legend of Zelda (list)	The Adventure of Link (リンクの冒険, Rinku no Bōken)	20 chapters	Manga	1987–1988	Maru Ran	Wanpaku Comics		Collected in 3 tankōbon volumes.
The Legend of Zelda (list)	The Legend of Zelda (ゼルダの伝説, Zeruda no Densetsu)	1 volume	Manga	1989	Yuu Mishouzaki	Wanpaku Comics		
The Legend of Zelda (list)	The Legend of Zelda	5 issues	Ongoing series	1990	George Caragonne	Valiant Comics		
The Legend of Zelda (list)	The Adventure of Link (リンクの冒険, Rinku no Bōken)	7 chapters	Manga	1991	Yuu Mishouzaki			
Life Is Strange	Life Is Strange/Life Is Strange: Partners in Time	22 issues	Ongoing series	2018-2022	Emma Vieceli, Claudia Leonardi, Andrea Izzo	Titan Comics	This series follows the "Sacrifice Arcadia Bay" ending.	List of volumes: Vol. 1: 9781785866456; Vol. 2: 978-1787730885; Vol. 3: 978-1787732070; Vol. 4: 978-1787734739; Vol. 5: 978-1787734746; Vol. 6: 978-1787734753

== M ==
Based on	Title	Length	Format	Publication date	Authors	Publisher	Notes	Collected editions
Mana	Seiken Densetsu: Legend of Mana (聖剣伝説レジェンドオブマナ)	33 chapters	Serialized manga	2000–2002	Shiro Amano	Enterbrain	Serialized in Famitsu Bros.	Collected in 5 tankōbon volumes.
Mana	Seiken Densetsu: Princess of Mana (聖剣伝説 PRINCESS of MANA)		Serialized manga	2006–2007	Satsuki Yoshino	Square Enix	Serialized in Gangan Powered.	Collected in 5 tankōbon volumes.
Mario	Super Mario-kun (スーパーマリオくん)	Ongoing	Serialized manga	1991–	Yukio Sawada	Shogakukan	Serialized in CoroCoro Comic.	
Marvel's Avengers	Marvel's Avengers: Black Widow	1 issue	One-shot	2020	Christos Gage	Marvel Comics		Marvel's Avengers: Road to A-Day: 978-0-7851-9465-1
Marvel's Avengers	Marvel's Avengers: Captain America	1 issue	One-shot	2019	Paul Allor	Marvel Comics		Marvel's Avengers: Road to A-Day: 978-0-7851-9465-1
Marvel's Avengers	Marvel's Avengers: Hulk	1 issue	One-shot	2020	Jim Zub	Marvel Comics		Marvel's Avengers: Road to A-Day: 978-0-7851-9465-1
Marvel's Avengers	Marvel's Avengers: Iron Man	1 issue	One-shot	2020	Jim Zub	Marvel Comics		Marvel's Avengers: Road to A-Day: 978-0-7851-9465-1
Marvel's Avengers	Marvel's Avengers: Thor	1 issue	One-shot	2020	Jim Zub	Marvel Comics		Marvel's Avengers: Road to A-Day: 978-0-7851-9465-1
Marvel: Future Fight	Marvel Future Fight	1 issue	One-shot	2015	Peter David, Todd Nauck	Marvel Comics		
Marvel Rivals	Marvel Rivals	1 issue	One-shot	2024-present	Paul Allor, Luca Claretti	Marvel Comics	Digital-first comic. Collects Marvel Rivals Infinity Comic #1-6.	
Marvel Rivals	Marvel Rivals: Hellfire Gala	1 issue	One-shot	2025	Paul Allor, Luca Claretti	Marvel Comics	Digital-first comic. Collects Marvel Rivals Infinity Comic #7-12.	
Marvel Rivals	Marvel Rivals: King in Black	1 issue	One-shot	2025	Paul Allor, Nico Leon	Marvel Comics	Digital-first comic. Collects Marvel Rivals Infinity Comic #13-18.	
Marvel Rivals	Marvel Rivals: The Cities of Heaven	1 issue	One-shot	2026	Paul Allor, Michael Shelfer, Eric Gapstur	Marvel Comics	Digital-first comic. Collects Marvel Rivals Infinity Comic #19-24.	
Marvel Rivals	Marvel Rivals: Duel of Kings	1 issue	One-shot	2026	Paul Allor, Salvador Espin, Jethro Morales, Dee Cunniffe, Rachelle Rosenberg	Marvel Comics	Digital-first comic. Collects Marvel Rivals Infinity Comic #25-30.	
Marvel Rivals	Marvel Rivals: Origins of the Hood	1 issue	One-shot	2026	Paul Allor, Francesco Archidiacono	Marvel Comics	Digital-first comic. Collects Marvel Rivals Infinity Comic #43-48.	
Marvel Rivals	Marvel Rivals: Ignite	1 issue	One-shot	2025	Peach Momoko, Yuji Kaku, Mitsuyasu Sakai	Marvel Comics	Although an anthology based on the game, the first story is set on Momoko's Demon Days series.	
Marvel Tokon: Fighting Souls	Marvel Tōkon: First Strike	1 issue	One-shot	2026	Steve Orlando, Josh Trujillo, Tom Waltz, Bruno Büll, Athila Fabbio, Ryusei Yamada	Marvel Comics		
Mass Effect	Mass Effect: Redemption	4 issues	Miniseries	2010	Mac Walters, John Jackson Miller	Dark Horse Comics		The Complete Comics: 978-1506719191
Mass Effect	Mass Effect: Blasto: Eternity Is Forever	1 issue	One-shot	2012	Mac Walters	Dark Horse Comics		The Complete Comics: 978-1506719191
Mass Effect	Mass Effect: Conviction	1 issue	One-shot	2011	Mac Walters	Dark Horse Comics		The Complete Comics: 978-1506719191
Mass Effect	Mass Effect: Discovery	4 issues	Miniseries	2017	Jeremy Barlow, John Dombrow	Dark Horse Comics		The Complete Comics: 978-1506719191
Mass Effect	Mass Effect: Evolution	4 issues	Miniseries	2011	Mac Walters, John Jackson Miller	Dark Horse Comics		The Complete Comics: 978-1506719191
Mass Effect	Mass Effect: Foundation	13 issues	Ongoing series	2013–2014	Mac Walters, Jeremy Barlow	Dark Horse Comics		The Complete Comics: 978-1506719191
Mass Effect	Mass Effect: Homeworlds	4 issues	Miniseries	2012	Mac Walters, Patrick Weekes, Jeremy Barlow, John Dombrow, Sylvia Feketekuty	Dark Horse Comics		The Complete Comics: 978-1506719191
Mass Effect	Mass Effect: Incursion	1 issue	One-shot	2010	Mac Walters	Dark Horse Comics	Originally released through IGN.	The Complete Comics: 978-1506719191
Mass Effect	Mass Effect: Invasion	4 issues	Miniseries	2011–2012	Mac Walters, John Jackson Miller	Dark Horse Comics		The Complete Comics: 978-1506719191
Mass Effect	Mass Effect: Inquisition	online comic	One-shot	2010	Mac Walters	Dark Horse Comics	Originally released through USA Today.	The Complete Comics: 978-1506719191
Mega Man	Novas Aventuras de Megaman	16 issues	Ongoing series	1996–1998	José Roberto Pereira (#1–5), Sérgio Peixoto Silva (#6), Orlando Tosetto Jr. (#7–16)	Estúdio PPA, Editora Magnum		
Mega Man	MegaMan	4 issues	Ongoing series	2003	Brian Augustyn	Dreamwave Productions		
Mega Man	Mega Man	55 issues	Ongoing series	2011–2016	Ian Flynn	Archie Comics		
Mega Man	Mega Man: Fully Charged	4 issues	Miniseries	2020–2021	A. J. Marchisello, Marcus Rineheart	Boom! Studios		
Mega Man	Mega Man Timelines	5 issues	Miniseries	June-October 2025	Tavis Maiden, Kenny Ruiz, Daniel Arsenault, Edwin Huang, Ian Flynn, Hanzo Steinbach, Matt Moylan, Dax Gordine, David Oxford, Mic Fong	Udon Entertainment	A series of one-shots set across different eras of the series.	
Metal Gear	Metal Gear Solid	12 issues	Miniseries	2004–2005	Kris Oprisko, Ashley Wood	IDW Publishing		
Metal Gear	Metal Gear Solid: Sons of Liberty	13 issues	Miniseries	2005–2007	Alex Garner, Ashley Wood	IDW Publishing		
Metroid	Metroid (メトロイド)	1 volume	Manga	1986		Wanpaku Comics	Manga story included in a strategy guide for the 1986 video game Metroid.	
Metroid	Metroid (メトロイド)	3 chapters	Manga	1994			Short four-panel comics published in Shonen Ou! Game Comic.	
Metroid	Metroid: Samus & Joey (メトロイド サムス&ジョイ)	17 chapters	Serialized manga	2002–2004	Kouji Izuki	Kodansha	Serialized in Comic BomBom.	Collected in 3 tankōbon volumes.
Metroid	Metroid (メトロイド)	16 chapters	Serialized manga	2002–2004	Kouji Tazawa, Kenji Ishikawa	Kodansha	Serialized in Monthly Magazine Z.	Collected in 2 tankōbon volumes.
Metroid	Metroid Prime: Episode of Aether (メトロイド プライム EPISODE OF AETHER)	7 chapters	Serialized manga	2005–2006	Hisashi Matsumoto	Kodansha	Serialized in Comic BomBom.	
Metroid	Metroid Prime	3 chapters	Miniseries	2002	Kato Li, Pat Lee, Sigmund Torre	Dreamwave Productions	Serialized in Nintendo Power.	
Minecraft	Minecraft: Sekai no Hate e no Tabi (MINECRAFT～世界の果てへの旅～)	Ongoing	Serialized manga	2020–	Kazuyoshi Seto	Shogakukan		
Mirror's Edge	Mirror's Edge	6 issues	Miniseries	2008–2009	Rhianna Pratchett, Matthew Dow Smith	WildStorm		Paperback: 978-1401225223
Mirror's Edge	Mirror's Edge: Exordium	6 issues	Miniseries	2015–2016	Christofer Emgard, Mattias Haggstrom, Robert Sammelin	Dark Horse Comics		
Mortal Kombat	Mortal Kombat: Collector's Edition Comic Book	1 issue		1992	John Tobias	Midway Games	Promotional comics originally made exclusively available by mail order, with the address appearing in-game.	
Mortal Kombat	Mortal Kombat II: Collector's Edition Comic Book	1 issue		1994	John Tobias	Midway Games	Promotional comics originally made exclusively available by mail order, with the address appearing in-game.	
Mortal Kombat	Mortal Kombat: Blood and Thunder	7 issues	Miniseries	1994	Charles Marshall	Malibu Comics	Issue #0 was presented without the Blood and Thunder subtitle.	Paperback: 978-1852866129
Mortal Kombat	Mortal Kombat: Tournament Edition	1 issue	One-shot	1994	Charles Marshall	Malibu Comics		
Mortal Kombat	Mortal Kombat: Goro, Prince of Pain	3 issues	Miniseries	1994	Charles Marshall	Malibu Comics		
Mortal Kombat	Mortal Kombat: U.S. Special Forces	2 issues	Miniseries	1995	Mark Paniccia	Malibu Comics		
Mortal Kombat	Mortal Kombat: Battlewave	6 issues	Miniseries	1995	Charles Marshall	Malibu Comics		
Mortal Kombat	Mortal Kombat: Rayden and Kano	3 issues	Miniseries	1995	Charles Marshall	Malibu Comics		
Mortal Kombat	Mortal Kombat: Baraka	1 issue	One-shot	1995	Charles Marshall	Malibu Comics		
Mortal Kombat	Mortal Kombat: Kung Lao	1 issue	One-shot	1995	Charles Marshall	Malibu Comics		
Mortal Kombat	Mortal Kombat: Kitana and Mileena	1 issue	One-shot	1995	Charles Marshall	Malibu Comics		
Mortal Kombat	Mortal Kombat: Tournament Edition II	1 issue	One-shot	1995	Charles Marshall	Malibu Comics		
Mortal Kombat	Mortal Kombat 4: Limited Edition	1 issue	Promotional comic	1998		WildStorm		
Mortal Kombat	Mortal Kombat vs. DC Universe: Beginnings	1 issue	Minicomic	2008		DC Comics		
Mortal Kombat	Mortal Kombat X	12 issues	Miniseries	2015–2016	Shawn Kittelsen	DC Comics		Vol. 1: 978-1401257088; Vol. 2: 978-1401258535; Vol. 3: 978-1401260842
Mortal Kombat	Mortal Kombat - Onslaught	1 issue	One-shot	2023	Tim Seeley, Dominic Cianciolo, Dexter Soy, Pop Mhan, Leonardo Rodrigues, Joe Prado & Fico Ossio	DC Comics		

== N ==
Based on	Title	Length	Format	Publication date	Authors	Publisher	Notes	Collected editions
Nintendo	Nintendo Comics System	9 issues	Ongoing series	1991		Valiant Comics		
Ninja Gaiden	Yaiba: Ninja Gaiden Z	3 issues	Miniseries	2014	Tim Seeley, Josh Emmons	Dark Horse Comics		
Ninja Gaiden	Ninja Gaiden '88		Miniseries	2024		Dark Horse Comics		

== O ==
Based on	Title	Length	Format	Publication date	Authors	Publisher	Notes	Collected editions
Overwatch	Overwatch	16 chapters	Digital comics	2016–2018		Blizzard Entertainment		Hardcover: 978-1506726694
Overwatch	Overwatch: Tracer – London Calling	5 chapters	Digital comics	2020	Mariko Tamaki, Babs Tarr	Dark Horse Comics	Digital-first comics.	Hardcover: 978-1506717098
Overwatch	Overwatch: New Blood	5 chapters	Digital comics	2021–2022	Ray Fawkes, Irene Koh	Dark Horse Comics	Digital-first comics.	Hardcover: 978-1506730677
Omori	Omori	Ongoing	Serialized manga	2024–	Nui Konoito, Omocat	Kodansha	Serialized in Monthly Afternoon magazine.	

== P ==
Based on	Title	Length	Format	Publication date	Authors	Publisher	Notes	Collected editions
Paprium	Paprium	1 volume	Manga	2020	Zebastian Brax, Luis Martin, Rebecca Gunter Ryan	WaterMelon Games	Included in the Limited Edition of the 2020 video game Paprium.	
Perfect Dark	Perfect Dark	6 issues	Miniseries	2006–2007	Eric Trautmann, Jason Carl	Prima Games		
Persona (list)	Megami Ibunroku: Persona (女神異聞録 ～ペルソナ～)	45 chapters	Serialized manga	1996–2000	Shinshu Ueda	Enix	Serialized in Monthly GFantasy.	Collected in 8 tankōbon volumes.
Persona (list)	Persona: Tsumi to Batsu (ペルソナ 罪と罰)	18 chapters	Serialized manga	2000–2001	Naotsugu Matsueda	Shueisha	Serialized in Monthly Shōnen Jump.	Collected in 3 tankōbon volumes.
Persona (list)	Persona 3 (ペルソナ3)	50 chapters	Serialized manga	2007–2017	Shuji Sogabe	ASCII Media Works	Serialized in Dengeki Maoh.	Collected in 11 tankōbon volumes.
Persona (list)	Persona 4 (ペルソナ4)	68 chapters	Serialized manga	2008–2019	Shuji Sogabe	ASCII Media Works	Serialized in Dengeki Maoh.	Collected in 13 tankōbon volumes.
Persona (list)	Persona 5 (ペルソナ5)	Ongoing	Serialized manga	2016–	Hisato Murasaki	Shogakukan	Serialized in Ura Sunday.	
Persona (list)	Persona 5: Mementos Mission (ペルソナ5 メメントスミッション)	19 chapters	Serialized manga	2018–2020	Rokuro Saitou	ASCII Media Works	Serialized in Dengeki Maoh.	Collected in 3 tankōbon volumes.
Pokémon	Main article: List of Pokémon manga							
Portal	Portal 2: Lab Rat	1 chapter	Digital comic	2011	Erik Wolpaw, Chet Faliszek, Jay Pinkerton, Ted Kosmatka, Michael Avon Oeming, Andrea Wicklund	Valve	Originally published in two parts.	Valve Presents: The Sacrifice and Other Steam-Powered Stories: 978-1595828699
Primal	Primal	1 issue	One-shot	2006–2007	Russell Uttley, Ben Oliver, Joshua Sorrell	Com.X; Sony Computer Entertainment	Promotional comic.	
Primal Rage	Primal Rage	4 issues	Miniseries	1996–1997	Chris Knowles, Kevin Rasel	Sirius Entertainment		
Prototype	Prototype	6 issues	Miniseries	2009	Justin Gray, Jimmy Palmiotti, Darick Robertson	WildStorm		Paperback: 978-1401226718
Prototype	Prototype 2	6 issues	Miniseries	2012	Dan Jolley, Paco Díaz, Chris Staggs, Victor Drujiniu	Dark Horse Comics	Digital comics.	Hardcover: 978-1595829184

== Q ==
Based on	Title	Length	Format	Publication date	Authors	Publisher	Notes	Collected editions
Quake	Quake Champions	4 issues	Miniseries	2017–2018	Ram V	Titan Comics		

== R ==
Based on	Title	Length	Format	Publication date	Authors	Publisher	Notes	Collected editions
Rage	Rage	3 issues	Miniseries	2011	Arvid Nelson, Andrea Mutti	Dark Horse Comics		Paperback: 978-1595827586
Ratchet & Clank	Ratchet & Clank	6 issues	Miniseries	2010–2011	T. J. Fixman, Adam Archer	WildStorm		Paperback: 978-1401231637
Resident Evil	Resident Evil	1 issue	One-shot comic	1996	Desmond Church, Chris Kramer, Dan Shaheen, Simone Seydoux, Dave Johnson	Marvel Comics	Promotional comic.	
Resident Evil	BIO HAZARD 2	60 issues	Manhua	1998–1999		King's Fountain		
Resident Evil	Resident Evil	5 issues	Magazine	1998–1999		Image Comics; WildStorm		Selected stories: Collection One: 978-1563895722
Resident Evil	Resident Evil: Fire and Ice	4 issues	Miniseries	2000–2001	Ted Adams, Kris Oprisko, Shawn Crystal	WildStorm		Paperback: 978-1401223816
Resident Evil	Resident Evil: Infinite Darkness - The Beginning	5 issues	Miniseries	2022-2024	Keith R. A. DeCandido	TokyoPop		Paperback: 978-1427868428
Resident Evil	BIOHAZARD CODE:Veronica	18 issues	Manhua		Lee Chung Hing, Hui King Sum	Tianhangse Publishing		List of volumes: * Vol. 1: 978-1563898990; Vol. 2: 978-1563899195; Vol. 3: 978-1563899201; Vol. 4: 978-1563899218
Resident Evil	biohazard 0	6 issues	Manhua	2003		Yulang Group		
Resident Evil	BIOHAZARD UMBRELLA CHRONICLES: Prelude to the Fall (バイオハザード アンブレラ・クロニクルズ -崩壊への序曲)	2 chapters	Serialized manga	2007	Masaru Miyazaki, Naotsugu Matsueda	Akita Shoten		
Resident Evil	Resident Evil	6 issues	Miniseries	2009–2011	Ricardo Sanchez	WildStorm		Paperback: 978-1401226022
Resident Evil	Resident Evil: The Marhawa Desire (バイオハザード～マルハワデザイア～)	41 chapters	Serialized manga	2012–2013	Naoki Serizawa	Akita Shoten		List of volumes: * Vol. 1: 978-4253132916; Vol. 2: 978-4253132923; Vol. 3: 978-4253132930; Vol. 4: 978-4253132947; Vol. 5: 978-4253132954
Resident Evil	Biohazard: Heavenly Island (バイオハザード ～ヘヴンリーアイランド～)	50 chapters	Serialized manga	2015–2017	Naoki Serizawa	Akita Shoten		
Resident Evil	BIOHAZARD the TOON	53 chapters	Webtoon	2016–2018				
Resistance	Resistance	6 issues	Miniseries	2009	Mike Costa, Ramon Pérez, C. P. Smith, Kody Chamberlain	Wildstorm		Paperback: 978-1401226725

== S ==
Based on	Title	Length	Format	Publication date	Authors	Publisher	Notes	Collected editions
Samurai Shodown	Main article: Samurai Shodown § Adaptations							
Silent Hill	Silent Hill: Dying Inside	5 issues	Miniseries	2004	Scott Ciencin	IDW Publishing		
Silent Hill	Silent Hill: Among the Damned	1 issue	One-shot	2004	Scott Ciencin	IDW Publishing		
Silent Hill	Silent Hill: Paint It Black	1 issue	One-shot	2005	Scott Ciencin	IDW Publishing		
Silent Hill	Silent Hill: The Grinning Man	1 issue	One-shot	2005	Scott Ciencin	IDW Publishing		
Silent Hill	Silent Hill: Dead/Alive	5 issues	Miniseries	2005–2006	Scott Ciencin	IDW Publishing		
Silent Hill	Silent Hill: Sinner's Reward	4 issues	Miniseries	2008	Tom Waltz	IDW Publishing		
Silent Hill	Silent Hill: Past Life	4 issues	Miniseries	2010–2011	Tom Waltz	IDW Publishing		
Silent Hill	Silent Hill: Downpour: Anne's Story	4 issues	Miniseries	2014	Tom Waltz	IDW Publishing		
Skullgirls	Skullgirls	Ongoing	Webcomic	2022–	Mike Exner III, Suzi Blake, Wiirdo	Webtoon		
Skylanders	Skylanders	13 issues	Ongoing series	2014–2015	Ron Marz, David A. Rodriguez	IDW Publishing		
Skylanders	Skylanders: Unexpected Allies	1 issue	One-shot	2015	David A. Rodriguez	IDW Publishing		
Skylanders	Skylanders: SuperChargers	6 issues	Miniseries	2015–2016	Ron Marz, David A. Rodriguez	IDW Publishing		
Skylanders	Skylanders: Spyro & Friends: Full Blast!	3 issues	Miniseries	2017–2018	Ron Marz, David A. Rodriguez	IDW Publishing		
Sly Cooper	The Adventures of Sly Cooper	2 issues		2004		GamePro Magazine	Giveaway comics.	
Sonic the Hedgehog (list)	Sonic the Hedgehog	1 issue	Minicomic	1991	Francis Mao	Sega	Promotional comic.	
Sonic the Hedgehog (list)	Sonic Forces	4 issues	Digital comic	2017	Ian Flynn	Sega	Promotional comic.	
Sonic the Hedgehog (list)	Sonic Frontiers Prologue: Convergence	1 issue	One-shot comic	2022	Ian Flynn	Sega	Prologue to the game.	
Sonic the Hedgehog (list)	Sonic Superstars: Fang's Big Break	1 issue	One-shot comic	2023	Ian Flynn	Sega	Prologue to the game.	
Sonic the Hedgehog (list)	Sonic X Shadow Generations X Chao	1 issue	One-shot manga	2024	Ian Flynn	Sega	Tie-in manga to Sonic X Shadow Generations.	
Sonic the Hedgehog (list)	Sonic the Hedgehog: Blue Racer (ソニック・ザ・ヘッジホッグ ブルーレーサー)	1 issue	One-shot manga	2025	Ian Flynn	Sega	Promotional comic as part of the "Racing Around the World" campaign with McLaren.	
Sonic the Hedgehog (list)	Sonic the Hedgehog (ソニック・ザ・ヘッジホッグ)	115 issues	Serialized manga	1992-1994		Shogakukan		
Sonic the Hedgehog (list)	The Jet Black Hedgehog: Shadow the Hedgehog (漆黒のハリネズミ シャドウ・ザ・ヘッジホッグ)	6 issues	Serialized manga	2024-2025	Yuki Imada	Shogakukan	Adaptation of Shadow Generations.	
Sonic the Hedgehog (list)	Sonic X Shadow: Tokyo Mission Episode 0 (ソニック × シャドウ TOKYO MISSION -Episode 0-)	1 issue	One-shot manga	2024	Yuki Imada	Shogakukan	Prequel to Sonic the Hedgehog 3.	
Sonic the Hedgehog (list)	Sonic and the Blade of Courage (ソニックと勇気のつるぎ)	1-	Serialized manga	2025-	Yuki Imada	Shogakukan		
Sonic the Hedgehog (list)	Sonic the Comic	223 issues	Ongoing series	1993-2002		Fleetway Publications		
Sonic the Hedgehog (list)	Sonic the Hedgehog	4 issues	Miniseries	1993	Michael Gallagher	Archie Comics	An issue # 1/4 was distributed with the Sega Mega Drive game as a preview of the first issue of this series.	
Sonic the Hedgehog (list)	Sonic the Hedgehog	290 issues	Ongoing series	1993–2017		Archie Comics	Longest-running comic series based on a video game, and any franchise.	
Sonic the Hedgehog (list)	Sonic the Hedgehog: In Your Face!	1 issue	One-shot comic	1995		Archie Comics		
Sonic the Hedgehog (list)	Sonic & Knuckles	1 issue	One-shot comic	1995		Archie Comics		
Sonic the Hedgehog (list)	Sonic the Hedgehog's Buddy – Tails	3 issues	Miniseries	1995–1996		Archie Comics		
Sonic the Hedgehog (list)	Sonic the Hedgehog Presents: Knuckles' Chaotix	1 issue	One-shot comic	1996		Archie Comics		
Sonic the Hedgehog (list)	Sonic & Knuckles: Mecha Madness Special	1 issue	One-shot comic	1996		Archie Comics		
Sonic the Hedgehog (list)	Super Sonic vs. Hyper Knuckles	1 issue	One-shot comic	1996		Archie Comics		
Sonic the Hedgehog (list)	Sonic's Friendly Nemesis – Knuckles	3 issues	Miniseries	1996		Archie Comics		
Sonic the Hedgehog (list)	Sonic Blast	1 issue	One-shot comic	1996		Archie Comics		
Sonic the Hedgehog (list)	Sonic the Hedgehog: Triple Trouble	1 issue	One-shot comic	1996		Archie Comics		
Sonic the Hedgehog (list)	Sonic Quest: The Death Egg Saga	3 issues	Miniseries	1996–1997		Archie Comics		
Sonic the Hedgehog (list)	Sonic Super Special	15 issues	Ongoing series	1997–2001	Ken Penders	Archie Comics		
Sonic the Hedgehog (list)	Knuckles the Echidna	32 issues	Ongoing series	1997–2000	Ken Penders	Archie Comics		
Sonic the Hedgehog (list)	Sonic Live!	1 issue	One-shot comic	1997	Ken Penders, Rich Koslowski, Kent Taylor	Archie Comics		
Sonic the Hedgehog (list)	Sonic X	40 issues	Ongoing series	2005–2009		Archie Comics	Based on the eponymous TV series.	
Sonic the Hedgehog (list)	Sonic Universe	94 issues	Ongoing series	2009–2017	Ian Flynn, Aleah Baker	Archie Comics		
Sonic the Hedgehog (list)	Sonic Super Digest	12 issues	Ongoing series	2012–2017		Archie Comics		
Sonic the Hedgehog (list)	Sonic Super Special	13 issues	Ongoing series	2011–2015	Ian Flynn	Archie Comics		
Sonic the Hedgehog (list)	Sonic Lost World	1 issue	One-shot comic	2013	Ian Flynn	Archie Comics	Halloween ComicFest 2013 giveaway.	
Sonic the Hedgehog (list)	Sonic Boom	11 issues	Ongoing series	2014–2015	Ian Flynn, Bill Freiberger, Sam Sandak Freilberger	Archie Comics	Based on the eponymous TV series.	
Sonic the Hedgehog (list)	Sonic Mega Drive	1 issue	One-shot comic	2016	Ian Flynn	Archie Comics		
Sonic the Hedgehog (list)	Sonic Mega Drive: The Next Level	1 issue	One-shot comic	2016	Ian Flynn	Archie Comics		
Sonic the Hedgehog (list)	Sonic the Hedgehog	1–	Ongoing series	2018–	Ian Flynn, Evan Stanley	IDW Publishing	Also has 4 Annuals	
Sonic the Hedgehog (list)	Team Sonic Racing	1 issue	One-shot comic	2018	Caleb Goellner	IDW Publishing		
Sonic the Hedgehog (list)	Sonic the Hedgehog: Tangle & Whisper	5 issues	Miniseries	2019	Ian Flynn	IDW Publishing		
Sonic the Hedgehog (list)	Sonic the Hedgehog: Bad Guys	4 issues	Miniseries	2020	Ian Flynn	IDW Publishing		
Sonic the Hedgehog (list)	Sonic the Hedgehog 30th Anniversary Special	1 issue	One-shot comic	2021		IDW Publishing		
Sonic the Hedgehog (list)	Sonic the Hedgehog 35th Anniversary Special	1 issue	One-shot comic	2026	Iasmin Omar Ata	IDW Publishing		
Sonic the Hedgehog (list)	Sonic the Hedgehog Free Comic Book Day 2021	1 issue	One-shot comic	2021	Gale Gilligan, David Mariotte	IDW Publishing		
Sonic the Hedgehog (list)	Sonic the Hedgehog: Imposter Syndrome	4 issues	Miniseries	2021–2022	Ian Flynn	IDW Publishing		
Sonic the Hedgehog (list)	Sonic the Hedgehog 2: The Official Movie Pre-quill	1 issue	One-shot comic	2022	Kiel Phegley	IDW Publishing	Prequel to the film.	
Sonic the Hedgehog (list)	Sonic the Hedgehog Free Comic Book Day 2022	1 issue	One-shot comic	2022	Ian Flynn, David Mariotte	IDW Publishing		
Sonic the Hedgehog (list)	Sonic the Hedgehog: Tails' 30th Anniversary Special	1 issue	One-shot comic	2022	Ian Flynn	IDW Publishing		
Sonic the Hedgehog (list)	Sonic the Hedgehog: Scrapnik Island	4 issues	Miniseries	2022-2023	Daniel Barnes	IDW Publishing		
Sonic the Hedgehog (list)	Sonic the Hedgehog: Endless Summer	1 issue	One-shot comic	2023	Gale Gilligan	IDW Publishing		
Sonic the Hedgehog (list)	Sonic the Hedgehog's 900th Adventure	1 issue	One-shot comic	2023		IDW Publishing		
Sonic the Hedgehog (list)	Sonic the Hedgehog: Amy's 30th Anniversary Special	1 issue	One-shot comic	2023	Ian Flynn	IDW Publishing		
Sonic the Hedgehog (list)	Sonic the Hedgehog: Halloween Special	1 issue	One-shot comic	2023	Mark Bouchard	IDW Publishing		
Sonic the Hedgehog (list)	Sonic the Hedgehog: Winter Jam	1 issue	One-shot comic	2023	Iasmin Omar Ata	IDW Publishing		
Sonic the Hedgehog (list)	Sonic the Hedgehog: Fang the Hunter	4 issues	Miniseries	2024	Ian Flynn	IDW Publishing		
Sonic the Hedgehog (list)	Sonic the Hedgehog: Spring Broken	1 issue	One-shot comic	2024	Josh Trujillo	IDW Publishing		
Sonic the Hedgehog (list)	Sonic the Hedgehog: Knuckles' 30th Anniversary Special	1 issue	One-shot comic	2024	Ian Flynn			
Sonic the Hedgehog (list)	DC x Sonic the Hedgehog	5 issues	Miniseries	2025	Ian Flynn, Adam Bryce Thomas	DC Comics	Crossover with DC Comics.	
Sonic the Hedgehog (list)	DC x Sonic the Hedgehog: Metal Legion	5 issues	Miniseries	2026	Ian Flynn, Adam Bryce Thomas	DC Comics	Second crossover with DC Comics.	
Space Ace	Space Ace	6 issues	Miniseries	2003	Robert Kirkman	CrossGen		
Space Quest	The Adventures of Roger Wilco	3 issues		1992	John Shaw	Adventure Comics		
Star Fox	Main article: Star Fox § Other media							
Star Ocean	Main article: Star Ocean: The Second Story (manga)							
Star Raiders	DC Graphic Novel #1	1 volume	Graphic Novel	1983	Elliot S. Maggin, José Luis García-López	DC Comics		
StarCraft	Main article: List of StarCraft media § Printed media							
Street Fighter	Street Fighter	3 issues	Miniseries	1993	Len Strazewski	Malibu Comics		Paperback: 978-1563980497
Street Fighter	Street Fighter: The Battle for Shadaloo	1 issue	One-shot	1994	Mike McAvennie	DC Comics		
Street Fighter	Street Fighter	15 issues	Ongoing series	2003–2005	Ken Siu-Chong	Image Comics, Udon Entertainment		
Street Fighter	Street Fighter II	7 issues	Miniseries	2005–2006	Ken Siu-Chong	Udon Entertainment		
Street Fighter	Street Fighter II Turbo	12 issues	Ongoing series	2008–2010	Ken Siu-Chong	Udon Entertainment		
Street Fighter	Street Fighter IV	4 issues	Miniseries	2009	Ken Siu-Chong	Udon Entertainment		
Street Fighter	Street Fighter Unlimited	12 issues	Ongoing series	2015–2016	Ken Siu-Chong, Jim Zub, Adam Warren, Chris Sarracini, Matt Moylan	Udon Entertainment		
Street Fighter	Street Fighter × G.I. Joe	6 issues	Miniseries	2016	Aubrey Sitterson	IDW Publishing		Paperback: 978-1631407444
Street Fighter	Street Fighter vs. Darkstalkers	9 issues	Miniseries	2017–2018	Matt Moylan, Ken Siu-Chong, David Lumsdon, Rob Armstrong	Udon Entertainment		Hardcover: 978-1772941159
Street Fighter	Street Fighter Reloaded	6 issues	Miniseries	2017–2018	Ken Siu-Chong, Andre Greenidge	Udon Entertainment		
Street Fighter	Teenage Mutant Ninja Turtles vs. Street Fighter	5 issues	Miniseries	2023	Paul Allor	IDW Publishing		
Super Robot Wars	Main article: Super Robot Wars § Manga							
Swordquest	Swordquest	3 issues	Minicomic	1982–1983	Roy Thomas, Gerry Conway, George Pérez, Dick Giordano	DC Comics	Comics released with the Atari 2600 video games Swordquest: Earthworld, Fireworld and Waterworld. A fourth issue was planned with the fourth entry, Airworld, but never published.	

== T ==
Based on	Title	Length	Format	Publication date	Authors	Publisher	Notes	Collected editions
Team Fortress 2	Team Fortress Comics	25 chapters	Digital comics	2009–2024		Valve	The series has 7 main chapters and several extra chapters.	Valve Presents: The Sacrifice and Other Steam-Powered Stories: 978-1595828699
Tekken	Main articles: Tekken § Other media, and Tekken Comic							
Toki	Toki: Memories of Ammalerina	1 issue	Minicomic	2018	Jacquet, Porcel	Microids	Included in the physical release of the 2018 Nintendo Switch video game Toki. Later included in digital ports.	
Tomb Raider	Main article: Tomb Raider (comics)							
Touhou Project	Touhou Bougetsushou: Silent Sinner in Blue. (東方儚月抄 Silent Sinner in Blue.)	21 chapters	Serialized manga	2007–2009	ZUN, Aki Eda	Ichijinsha		
Touhou Project	Touhou Ibara Kasen: Wild and Horned Hermit. (東方茨歌仙 ～Wild and Horned Hermit.)	51 chapters	Serialized manga	2010–2019	ZUN, Aya Azuma	Ichijinsha		
Touhou Project	Touhou Suzunaan: Forbidden Scrollery. (東方鈴奈庵 ～ Forbidden Scrollery.)	54 chapters	Serialized manga	2012–2017	ZUN, Moe Harukawa	Kadokawa Shoten		
Touhou Project	Touhou Chireikiden: Hansoku Tantei Satori (東方智霊奇伝 反則探偵さとり)	Ongoing	Serialized manga	2019–	ZUN, Ginmokusei, Yuu Akimaki	Kadokawa Shoten	Digital manga.	
Touhou Project	The Lotus Eaters, Drunk and Sober (東方酔蝶華 ～ ロータスイーター達の酔醒)	Ongoing	Serialized manga	2019–	ZUN, Mizutaki	Kadokawa Shoten		
Tornado Outbreak	Tornado Outbreak #0	10 pages	Digital comic	2009		Konami	Released as marketing material to promote the release of the video game.	
Turok	Turok 2: Seeds of Evil	1 issue	Magazine	1998		Acclaim		
TwinBee	Main article: TwinBee (series) § Manga							
Twisted Metal 2	Twisted Metal 2	1 issue	Magazine	1996	Jamie Delano, Phil Hester	DC Comics	It was given out as a prize for a contest held by Sony's Tips & Tricks department around the time of Twisted Metal 2's release. Only 50 contestants won, and the remaining 50 copies were either given to fans who wrote in requesting a copy, or were presumably destroyed.	

== U ==
Based on	Title	Length	Format	Publication date	Authors	Publisher	Notes	Collected editions
Ultima	Main article: Ultima (series) § Other media							
Uncharted	Uncharted: Eye of Indra	4 chapters	Motion comic	2009	Marco Castiello	Sony		
Uncharted	Uncharted	6 issues	Miniseries	2011–2012	Joshua Williamson, Sergio Sandoval	DC Comics		Paperback: 978-1401232696

== V ==
Based on	Title	Length	Format	Publication date	Authors	Publisher	Notes	Collected editions
Virtua Fighter	Virtua Fighter	1 issue	One-shot comic	1995	Mark Paniccia, Patrick Rolo	Marvel Comics		
Virtua Fighter	Virtua Fighter	2 volumes	Manga	1995	Kyōichi Nanatsuki, Yoshihide Fujiwara	Shogakukan		

== W ==
Based on	Title	Length	Format	Publication date	Authors	Publisher	Notes	Collected editions
Warcraft	Main article: Warcraft § Comics							
Warlords	DC Graphic Novel #2	1 volume	Graphic novel	1983	Steve Skeates, David Wenzel	DC Comics		
Watch Dogs	Watch Dogs	2 issues	Miniseries	2019	Simon Kansara, Horne	Titan Comics		Paperback: 978-1785864049
Watch Dogs	Watch Dogs: Legion	4 issues	Miniseries	2021–2022	Gabriel Germain, Sylvain Runberg	Behemoth Comics; Ubisoft	Digital-first comics.	
Werewolf: The Last Warrior	Werewolf: The Last Warrior	1 issue	One-shot	1990		Data East Comics		

== Y ==
Based on	Title	Length	Format	Publication date	Authors	Publisher	Notes	Collected editions
Your Turn to Die -Death Game by Majority-	Your Turn to Die -Death Game by Majority- (キミガシネ ‐多数決デスゲーム‐)	36 chapters	Serialized manga	2019–2023	Tatsuya Ikegami	Kadokawa Shoten	Serialized in Monthly Shōnen Ace magazine.	Collected in 5 tankōbon volumes.
Your Turn to Die -Death Game by Majority-	Kimi yon ~dare mo shinanai kimigashine~ (きみよん～誰も死なないキミガシネ～)	1 volume	Manga	2021	Yusuke Higeoni, Nankidai	Kadokawa Shoten		
Yume Nikki	Yume Nikki (ゆめにっき)	9 chapters	Serialized manga	2013–2014	Hitoshi Tomizawa, Machigerita	Takeshobo	Serialized in Manga Life Win+ web magazine.	Collected in 1 tankōbon volume.

== See also ==
- Lists of comics based on media
  - List of comics based on fiction
  - List of comics based on Hasbro properties
  - List of comics based on television programs
  - List of comics based on unproduced film projects
- Lists of media based on video games
  - List of films based on video games
  - List of novels based on video games
  - List of television series based on video games
  - List of anime based on video games
- Lists of media based on comics
  - List of films based on comics
  - List of novels based on comics
  - List of video games based on comics
  - List of television programs based on comics
- Lists of films based on media
  - Lists of works of fiction made into feature films
  - List of short fiction made into feature films
  - List of plays adapted into feature films (disambiguation)
  - List of films based on poems
  - List of films based on comic strips
  - List of films based on manga
  - List of films based on magazine articles
  - List of films based on toys
  - List of films based on video games
  - List of films based on television programs
  - List of live-action films based on cartoons and comics
- Lists of media based on films
  - List of films adapted into novels
  - List of comics based on films
  - List of video games based on films
  - List of television programs based on films
- Lists of video games based on media
  - List of video games based on anime or manga
  - List of video games based on cartoons
  - List of video games based on comics
