= Assassin's Creed Chronicles =

Video game sub-series in the Assassin's Creed franchise

- Cover art featuring the three Assassins (from left to right): Arbaaz Mir, Shao Jun, and Nikolai Orelov
- Developer: Climax Studios
- Publisher: Ubisoft
- Designer: Matt Duff
- Programmer: Ben Potton
- Artist: Neale Williams
- Composers: Aaron Miller; Mark Rutherford
- Series: Assassin's Creed
- Engine: Unreal Engine 3
- Platforms: Microsoft Windows; PlayStation 4; Xbox One; PlayStation Vita
- Release: Microsoft Windows, PlayStation 4, Xbox One: WW: April 21, 2015 (China); WW: January 12, 2016 (India); WW: February 9, 2016 (Russia & Trilogy Pack); PlayStation Vita: WW: April 5, 2016
- Genres: Action-adventure, stealth
- Mode: Single-player

Assassin's Creed Chronicles is a sub-series of video games in the Assassin's Creed franchise. The series consists of three games developed by Climax Studios and published by Ubisoft. The games feature new protagonists and settings and a design that is new to the series: 2.5D environments inspired by traditional brush paintings. The first entry, Assassin's Creed Chronicles: China, was released on April 21, 2015, for Microsoft Windows, PlayStation 4 and Xbox One. It was followed by Assassin's Creed Chronicles: India and Assassin's Creed Chronicles: Russia on January 12, 2016, and February 9, 2016, respectively. A collection comprising all three games was released on February 9, 2016, for the same platforms, and on April 5, 2016, for the PlayStation Vita.

== Gameplay ==
All three Chronicles games are 2.5D side scrolling platformers. Players control the protagonist from a third-person perspective and must make their way past enemy guards and other obstacles to reach the end of each level. The levels are all linear and feature little in terms of exploration, although some include hidden areas and collectibles, such as Animus shards, chests, and Sync points (which reveal the locations of other collectibles on the in-game map).

The core gameplay of each title revolves around stealth and combat. Stealth consists of the player using various tactics, such as hiding in the shadows or creating distractions, to stray away from the enemies' cones of vision. If the player is detected, then an alarm is raised, prompting all nearby enemies to actively search for the player until they either find them or give up. The games' combat system revolves around weakening the enemy's defense until they can be executed; players can use light and heavy attacks, block incoming strikes, and perform some more advanced moves, like dodging gunfire and rolling over enemies. Parkour is also featured in the games, although players are restricted to only being able to climb areas highlighted with more color.

Players are scored at the end of each level based on their performance, which takes into account various factors, such as the number of times they have been detected and whether or not they have completed that level's optional objective. The total score is calculated by adding up the 'ranks' received for each section of the level. There are three possible ranks that can be obtained in Chronicles: China: Shadow, the highest-scoring rank, earned for passing a section without being detected and without killing any enemy; Assassin, earned for passing a section undetected and assassinating at least one enemy; and Brawler, obtained when the player is detected and forced into combat. In India and Russia, the Brawler rank has been replaced with Silencer, which is earned for remaining undetected and using only non-lethal takedowns (which are absent in China). Some levels do not feature these ranks, and instead score the player based on the time taken to complete the level. Depending on their score, players can unlock new upgrades for their character, such as an increased health bar.

Each protagonist has a unique arsenal of weapons and gadgets that can be used in both combat and stealth situations. In China, Shao Jun wields a standard jian sword, throwing knives, firecrackers and noise-creating darts, which can be used to temporarily incapacitate or distract enemies. In India, Arbaaz Mir has a typical Mughal and Dravidian Hindu sword resembling an Aruval of Tamil Nadu, Urumi from Kerala, a concealed Katar with Bagh nakh, and Chakram, as well as smoke bombs and a slingshot with rock pellets. In Russia, Nikolai Orelov possesses a custom Berdan rifle fitted with a bayonet which can be used for melee combat with sniping capabilities, and a grapnel gun that can also produce electricity in order to short out electricity boxes, spotlights, lamp posts or kill unsuspecting enemies standing on water puddles.

== Plot ==
=== Assassin's Creed Chronicles: China ===
Chronicles: China is set in 16th-century Imperial China, during the Ming dynasty, and follows Shao Jun, the Assassin introduced in the short film Assassin's Creed: Embers. In 1526, Shao Jun returns to China after a long journey to Europe, where she visited the retired Assassin Mentor Ezio Auditore da Firenze and learned the key to liberating her people. Her mission is to eliminate the Eight Tigers, a group of influential Templars who rule China from the shadows, with the Emperor as their puppet, and who oversaw the extermination of most of the Chinese Assassin Brotherhood.

Shao Jun's first target is Gao Feng, the warden of a prison in the Maijishan Grottoes, and in order to get close to him, she allows herself to be captured, along with a box given to her by Ezio, which is a Precursor artifact. After escaping and killing Gao Feng, Shao Jun travels to the port city of Macau with fellow Assassin Wang Yangming, who already killed another Tiger, Ma Yongcheng ("The Butcher"), in order to assassinate Yu Dayong ("The Slaver") and recover the Precursor box. Shao Jun succeeds, and escapes after the Templars set the port on fire in retaliation.

In 1529, Shao Jun goes after Wei Bin ("The Snake"), the second-in-command of the Tigers, in Nan'an. After killing him, however, she learns that the Tigers' leader, Zhang Yong, knows that Wang Yangming has the Precursor box and is hunting him down. Shao Jun tries to save Yangming, but arrives too late. In 1530, Shao Jun infiltrates the Forbidden City to seek the help of Empress Zhang, an old friend from during her years as a concubine, only to discover that the Templars have forced the Empress to lure Shao Jun into a trap. Shao Jun forgives her, and escapes after killing the Tiger Qiu Ju ("The Demon").

In 1532, Shao Jun learns that Zhang Yong is plotting to maintain his grip on power by allowing the Mongols, led by Altan Khan, to invade China. Shao Jun travels to the Great Wall and prevents the Mongol invasion before facing Zhang Yong. He reveals that the Precursor box is no longer in China, as it has been given to his fellow Templars, and attempts to flee, but Shao Jun kills him. With the last Tiger eliminated, Shao Jun claims that her destiny is not to search for the box, but to stay in China and rebuild the Brotherhood. Years later, an elderly Shao Jun, now the Mentor of the Chinese Assassins, plots the assassination of the Jiajing Emperor by sending him lethal mercury disguised as an elixir of life.

=== Assassin's Creed Chronicles: India ===
Chronicles: India is set in 19th-century India, during the final years of the Sikh Empire, and follows Arbaaz Mir, the protagonist of the graphic novel Assassin's Creed: Brahman and father of Henry Green, a supporting character in Assassin's Creed Syndicate. In 1841, following the assassination of Maharaja Ranjit Singh two years prior and the recent passing of his son and successor Kharak Singh, Templar agents within the East India Company attempt to strengthen their control over the country during this period of political instability, as well as find more Precursor sites. Arbaaz managed to delay the Templars' plans by retrieving the Koh-i-Noor diamond, a powerful Precursor artifact, but while Arbaaz is away visiting his lover, Princess Pyara Kaur, the Templars attack the Assassin headquarters in Amritsar, stealing the Koh-i-Noor and capturing the Brotherhood's Mentor, Hamid.

After interrogating a British officer for Hamid's whereabouts, Arbaaz infiltrates the Templars' headquarters and rescues his Mentor. Hamid reveals that the Templars' new leader, William Sleeman, hopes to use the Precursor box to unravel the Koh-i-Noor's secrets, prompting Arbaaz to follow Sleeman and his men into an underground Precursor temple. After making his way past ancient death traps, Arbaaz confronts Sleeman, just as the latter unlocks a map showing the locations of other Precursor sites around the globe. Sleeman fires his gun at Arbaaz, who dodges the shot and lets it a Precursor structure, causing a chain reaction that results in the entire temple collapsing. Escaping back to the surface, Arbaaz reunites with Hamid and learns that the Templars are organizing an expedition to Afghanistan, one of the locations shown on the map.

Arbaaz travels to Herat, where British forces have occupied the city's citadel and are being besieged by the Afghans. Arbaaz opens the gates of the citadel to let the Afghans in and create a distraction, allowing him to explore the Precursor site underneath the citadel. He finds a pedestal, but before he can touch it, he is held at gunpoint and captured by Sleeman and the Templars. Arbaaz is taken to the Katasraj Temple in Punjab, Pakistan, where he escapes and discovers that Sleeman left the Koh-i-Noor and the Precursor box behind, to be guarded by his right-hand man, Alexander Burnes. Arbaaz bests Burnes in combat, but chooses to spare his life; this earns him Burnes' respect, who orders his men to allow Arbaaz to leave with the diamond and the box.

Arbaaz returns to Amritsar, only to learn from Hamid that the Templars have taken over the Maharaja's Summer Palace and are holding Pyara hostage. Arbaaz infiltrates the palace and confronts Sleeman, who orders him to hand over the Koh-i-Noor and the Precursor box while holding Pyara at knifepoint. Arbaaz tosses the artifacts into the air just as Pyara stabs Sleeman with her own knife, forcing him to let her go. After Arbaaz and Pyara escape to safety, the former reveals that he managed to grab the Koh-i-Noor in the confusion, but the box has been lost to the Templars. Some time later, Arbaaz gives the Koh-i-Noor to Ethan Frye, a British Assassin and the father of Jacob and Evie Frye, for safekeeping.

=== Assassin's Creed Chronicles: Russia ===
Chronicles: Russia is set in early 20th-century Soviet Russia, in the aftermath of the October Revolution of 1917, and follows Nikolai Orelov, the protagonist of the comic book Assassin's Creed: The Fall and its graphic novel sequel, The Chain. In 1918, Nikolai contemplates retiring from the Assassin Brotherhood and leaving the country with his family, but agrees to perform one final mission: to recover the Precursor box, which is believed to be in possession of the Romanov family. On the night of 16–17 July, he travels to Yekaterinburg and infiltrates the house where former Tsar Nicholas II and his family are being held, only to witness their execution at the hands of Templar agents within the Red Army, who also seek the box. Nikolai discovers that the Tsar's youngest daughter, Anastasia, survived the massacre and has the box, which somehow links her to Shao Jun, giving her the latter's memories and abilities, which she is unable to control.

Taking pity on Anastasia, Nikolai decides to take her back to the Brotherhood in the hope that they could help her. Pursued by both the Templars and the Bolsheviks, the two escape Yekaterinburg on a train headed to Kazan, arriving there in September, in the midst of the Red Army's attempt to retake the city. Nikolai leaves to find his old friend, Leon Trotsky, only to discover that the latter, believing Anastasia to be too dangerous as a symbol to be left alive, has allied with the Templars. Trotsky betrays Nikolai to the Templars, who torture him for the location of Anastasia and the Precursor box. Anastasia manages to rescue Nikolai, and together they escape Kazan by stealing a boat.

Nikolai and Anastasia arrive in Moscow, where the two are separated upon meeting the other Assassins, who take Anastasia away to experiment on her and find a possible cure for her condition. Nikolai is instructed to return to the Assassins' bureau to make a report about his mission, but overhears two Assassins talking about how Anastasia is now a living Precursor artifact and that they must extract Shao Jun's memories from her, likely killing her in the process. Caring for Anastasia and enraged by the Assassins' lies, Nikolai decides to betray the Brotherhood to save the girl. After interrogating an Assassin, he learns that Anastasia was taken to the Kremlin, and proceeds to make his away across the city while avoiding his former Assassin brothers, who now have orders to kill him.

After infiltrating the facility where Anastasia is being kept, Nikolai rescues her and the two work together to escape back to the city. Once there, the Assassins try to kill them using a tank, but Nikolai is able to destroy it. Afterwards, Nikolai gives Anastasia false documents originally intended for his wife, providing her with a new identity, Anna Anderson, and a means to leave the country unnoticed. The two part ways, with Anastasia planning to start a new life in Germany and believing that she will be able to keep Shao Jun's memories under control.

=== Secret ending ===
A secret ending can be unlocked in Chronicles: Russia by inputting hidden codes found throughout all three games. The ending takes place in the modern day, where Templar agent Juhani Otso Berg meets up with the Head of Operations at Abstergo Industries, Laetitia England. Berg, who has recently studied the memories of the Templar Shay Cormac to learn more about the Precursor box, presents it to England, who instructs him to take it to Dr. Álvaro Gramática in secret. Gramática claims the box to be instrumental to the success of Abstergo's Phoenix Project.

== Development and release ==
Assassin's Creed Chronicles: China was announced in September 2014 as part of the season pass for Assassin's Creed Unity. On March 31, 2015, it was announced that Chronicles: China was part of a trilogy, with Chronicles: India and Chronicles: Russia to be released at a later time. The trilogy was developed by Climax Studios in association with Ubisoft Montreal. Chronicles: China was released on April 21, 2015, for Microsoft Windows, PlayStation 4 and Xbox One, and is the first title in the franchise to utilize Epic Games' Unreal Engine 3.

On December 8, 2015, Ubisoft announced that Chronicles: India would be released on January 12, 2016, and Chronicles: Russia would be released on February 9, 2016, alongside a collection of the three games titled the Trilogy Pack. A PlayStation Vita version of the Trilogy Pack was released on April 5, 2016.

== Reception ==
Assassin's Creed Chronicles: China

Aggregate score
Aggregator	Score
Metacritic	(PC) 67/100 (PS4) 69/100 (XONE) 67/100

Assassin's Creed Chronicles: India

Aggregate score
Aggregator	Score
Metacritic	(PC) 63/100 (PS4) 63/100 (XONE) 64/100

Assassin's Creed Chronicles: Russia

Aggregate score
Aggregator	Score
Metacritic	(PC) 53/100 (PS4) 60/100 (XONE) 62/100

Assassin's Creed Chronicles: China received "mixed or average" reviews from critics upon release, according to review aggregator website Metacritic.

Assassin's Creed Chronicles: India received "mixed or average" reviews from critics upon release, according to review aggregator Metacritic.

Assassin's Creed Chronicles: Russia received "mixed or average" reviews from critics upon release, according to review aggregator Metacritic.
