= Assassin's Creed: Brahman =

Graphic novel

- Date: 30 October 2013 (digital); 29 January 2014 (paperback)
- Main characters: Arbaaz Mir, Jot Soora
- Series: Assassin's Creed
- Page count: 96 pages
- Publisher: UbiWorkshop

Creative team
- Writers: Cameron Stewart; Karl Kerschl
- Artists: Axel Buckley Stewart; Karl Kerschl; Nicolas Siner (cover artist)
- Pencillers: Karl Kerschl; Brenden Fletcher
- Colourists: John Rauch
- ISBN: 9782924006085

Chronology
- Preceded by: Assassin's Creed: The Chain

Assassin's Creed: Brahman is a graphic novel published by UbiWorkshop in October 2013. Set in the Assassin's Creed universe, it tells the story of Arbaaz Mir, a member of the Indian Brotherhood of Assassins during the 19th century, who fights the increasing influence and occupation of the East India Company while also clashing with the Assassins' longtime enemies, the Templar Order. The framing story, set in 2013, follows programmer Jot Soora, who becomes caught in the Assassin-Templar conflict when his fiancée, Monima Das, is revealed to be a descendant of Arbaaz possessing genetic memories that can help both the Assassins and Templars locate a powerful artifact.

The book is written and illustrated by Cameron Stewart and Karl Kerschl, who previously worked on the comic book miniseries, Assassin's Creed: The Fall, and its graphic novel sequel, Assassin's Creed: The Chain. A video game sequel to Brahman, Assassin's Creed Chronicles: India, was released in January 2016.

== Plot ==
In 1839 India, during the rule of the Sikh Empire, the Assassin Arbaaz Mir recovers a document detailing various Pieces of Eden, most importantly the Koh-i-Noor diamond, which is said to hold the power to bind all of the other Pieces' fates and can only be wielded by gods or women. With the Koh-i-Noor being protected by Maharaja Ranjit Singh, Arbaaz is tasked by his mentor Hamid with retrieving it, as Singh's heirs are not as interested in the diamond and would allow it to fall into the hands of the Templars. Together with Raza Soora, a mute slave boy he purchased from Hamid, Arbaaz infiltrates Singh's palace in Amritsar by posing as an emissary from Kashmir and meets British Empire representatives William Hay Macnaghten and Francis Cotton, the latter of whom is a Templar also seeking the Koh-i-Noor. While searching for the diamond, Arbaaz meets Princess Pyara Kaur, Singh's granddaughter, and shares an intimate moment with her.

After Raza locates the Koh-i-Noor, Arbaaz follows him into a series of secret chambers underneath the palace, where they find the diamond inside a hidden First Civilization temple. Arbaaz gives Raza the Koh-i-Noor for safekeeping before his identity is exposed by Macnaghten and Cotton and he is arrested by Singh's guards. Raza gives the Koh-i-Noor to Pyara and convinces her to free Arbaaz so that he can ensure her grandfather's safety, but the Assassin is too late to prevent Singh from being poisoned by the British. While Arbaaz is framed by Cotton for Singh's murder and forced to flee from the palace guards, Pyara tends to her dying grandfather, who asks her to take the Koh-i-Noor far away from India to keep it safe from the Templars. Cotton catches Pyara in the courtyard, where Arbaaz is fighting the guards, and tries to kill her and take the Koh-i-Noor. Raza attacks Cotton, allowing Pyara to unleash the artifact's power and kill everyone in the courtyard except Arbaaz and Raza.

In 2013, Jot Soora is a programmer for the Bangalore-based company MysoreTech, which has partnered with Abstergo Industries to distribute the Animus as an entertainment product dubbed the "Brahman V.R." across India. While working on the Brahman V.R., Jot discovers it allows users to relive their ancestors' genetic memories, which are unknowingly uploaded to Abstergo's servers. After bringing the device home to investigate it further, Jot discovers that he is a descendant of Raza, while his fiancée, famous actress Monima Das, also uses it to relive the memories of her ancestors, Arbaaz and Pyara. One night, after being caught by his co-worker Siobhan Dhami while working on the Brahman V.R., Jot, ashamed of his heritage, decides to lie that he is descended from Arbaaz and Pyara.

Later, while preparing to visit Monima at her film studio in Mumbai, Jot is abducted by Siobhan and her brother Jasdip, who reveal themselves to be Assassins trying to locate the Koh-i-Noor. They connect Jot to the Brahman V.R., hoping to use Arbaaz's memories to find the artifact, only to discover that Jot lied about his heritage. The Assassins' hideout is then attacked by Abstergo agents who kill Siobhan while Jasdip helps Jot escape to safety. After reuniting with Monima, the couple are kidnapped by Abstergo, who also hope to locate the Koh-i-Noor using the genetic memories of a living descendant of Arbaaz. While being transported in a van, Jasdip returns to rescue Jot, but inadvertently causes the van's driver to lose control and drive into the Mithi River. Jasdip is able to save Jot from drowning, but Monima remains trapped in the van and dies.

Jot is taken to another Assassin hideout where, overcome by grief over Monima's death, he uses the Brahman V.R. to relive her memories, leading the Assassins to realize that Monima is Pyara's descendant and her memories contain the key to finding the Koh-i-Noor. After downloading Monima's memories onto Jot's phone, the Assassins delete them from Abstergo's servers to lead the Templars to believe the trail is a dead end. Just then, more Abstergo agents storm the hideout, as its location was compromised by the Brahman V.R, but Jasdip is able to fight them off while Jot escapes with the phone. Later, Jot returns to the scene of Monima's death and watches a video of his marriage proposal to her, reminiscing of better times together.
