= Gotham Academy (comic book) =

2014–2017 American comic book

Publication information
- Publisher: DC Comics
- Schedule: Monthly
- Format: Ongoing series
- Genre: Superhero
- Publication date: October 2014 – August 2017
- No. of issues: 30 plus 1 Annual

Creative team
- Written by: Becky Cloonan, Brenden Fletcher
- Artist(s): Karl Kerschl, Babs Tarr, Becky Cloonan
- Penciller: Karl Kerschl
- Colorist(s): Michele Assarasakron, Dave McCaig, John Rauch

Gotham Academy was an American comic book series published by DC Comics from October 2014 to August 2017. Created by writers Becky Cloonan and Brenden Fletcher and artist Karl Kerschl, it ran for 18 issues and an annual under The New 52, then continued for 12 issues as Gotham Academy: Second Semester under DC Rebirth. Set in the DC Universe's Batman mythos, the series follows Olive Silverlock, a teenage girl, and her friends as they investigate the mysteries and threats of Gotham City's most prestigious prep school, Gotham Academy, which sits across the road from Arkham Asylum.

In 2016, the series had a crossover with Boom! Studios' Lumberjanes a prequel limited series titled Gotham Academy: First Year was published in 2025-2026. Aspects of the series were used in the Gotham Knights television series.

== Publication history ==
Gotham Academy was launched on October 1, 2014 as a part of the ninth and final wave of comics under DC Comics' The New 52 imprint and the short lived DC You initiative. It was created by writers Becky Cloonan and Brenden Fletcher and artist Karl Kerschl. The team began conceiving the series in 2014 as they all lived in Montreal. At the time, it was one of only very few young adult books in the main DC Universe. Cloonan identified Batman mysteries, Harry Potter, and Nancy Drew stories as the influential touchstones the team wanted to hit. Gotham Academy ran for eighteen issues and one annual until May 11, 2016. The final three issues were subtitled as Gotham Academy: Yearbook. A one-shot comic titled Gotham Academy: Endgame #1 was also published on April 1, 2015 as a tie-in to the "Batman: Endgame" story arc and is presented as an anthology of stories about the Joker told by the students.

A six issue crossover miniseries between Gotham Academy and Boom! Studios's Lumberjanes, written by Chynna Clugston Flores with art by Rosemary Valero-O'Connell and titled Lumberjanes/Gotham Academy, was published between June 8 and November 6, 2016. A second volume of the main series by the same main creative team, titled Gotham Academy: Second Semester, debuted in September 14, 2016, as part of the DC Rebirth initiative, with the final twelve issue released on August 9, 2017. The series had originally been announced in February 2016 as Gotham Academy: Next Semester. The creators said that they had always intended the series to end, with the final story arc wrapping up all plot points from the previous issues.

Some of the characters from Gotham Academy have appeared in other Gotham related comics throughout the years. Mia 'Maps' Mizoguchi appeared in a story in the anthology Batman Black and White (2021) #4 in March 2021 and a back up story in Batman (vol. 3) #119-#121 in early 2022, both by Karl Kersch, in which she briefly teamed up with Batman as a Robin to find a missing class mate. A Gotham Academy story by the original creative team was also included in the anthology one-shot DC's Saved by the Belle Reve #1 on August 30, 2022. The stories from 2021-2022 were later collected in the Gotham Academy: Maps Of Mystery one-shot on May 9, 2023 in preparation for the Gotham Knights television series. A third comic series, again by the same creators and titled Gotham Academy: First Year, was published as a six issue limited series between October 1, 2025, and August 5, 2026. A prequel to the original series, First Year takes place during Olive Silverlock's arrival at the Academy and introduces a new classic Batman villain to the series.

== Plot ==
=== Issues #1-18 ===
After distancing herself from her friends and boyfriend over summer, Olive begins a new school year after her mother was instated at Arkham Asylum. At the behest of her friend Mia "Maps" Mizoguchi, the two begin exploring the academy. After seeing masked figures, Olive finds that her classmates Pomeline Fritch and her boyfriend Heathcliff are part of a secret society, and are attempting to capture the ghost of Millie Jane Cobblepot, who is haunting the grounds. Olive interrupts their ritual, causing Millie Jane to run amok. Olive promises that she will help catch the ghost who is connected to a diary she owns. While searching, Olive and Maps spot a blonde boy who Olive recognizes, but she cannot recall why.

Realizing that Millie Jane's ghost is connected to the North Hall (which was destroyed by a fire), Olive, Maps, and Pom ask Colton Rivera for help, a student who can sneak them into the off-limits hall. Inside, the four find strange symbols on the ground. They accidentally alert campus security, and the hall is put on lockdown. The group decides to investigate the symbols they found. That night, Olive discovers that Heathcliff has been faking the ghost's existence to convince Pomeline that her rituals were working. Olive promises to keep it secret. When she returns to her room, she discovers tunnels that connect the campus to the underground and finds that Killer Croc has been living there, who broke out of Arkham when it collapsed.

The group figures that Croc is hiding in the North Hall. They sneak into the headmaster's office for Colton's fireworks to get through the blocked entrance. On their way, Olive spots a Batman-like figure following them, and shoots it with a crossbow from the headmaster's office. Olive finds it is the blonde boy, Tristan, who has been affected by the Langstrom Virus, causing him to sometimes become a mutated half-bat creature. He explains that he rescued Olive from the night the North Hall burned down while she was sleepwalking.

Finally breaking into the North Hall, the group confronts Croc. Croc explains that he knew Olive's mother, Sybil from Arkham and she asked him to look out for Olive. In the midst of talking, Batman descends and begins to fight Croc. The cops show up amidst the battle, as the group runs, all but Olive, who lights the bag of fireworks and burns the North Hall once more to kill Batman. Croc rescues Olive from the falling roof then retreats into the tunnels where the two bid goodbye. Later, on the roof, it is revealed that she despises Batman because he put her mother in Arkham. Batman explains that Arkham protected Gotham from Olive's mother. Olive lies and tells Batman The Diary of Millie Jane Cobblepot burned up in the fire.

The following Friday, Kyle Mizoguchi, confronts Olive, and the two realize they are still in love. Later, Maps realizes that the mysterious symbol stands for Arkham Asylum, explaining that the tunnels connected to the asylum. The group decides to call themselves the Detective Club. Later, Damian Wayne breaks into a room and takes Millie Jane's diary. He then gives it to Bruce Wayne, the headmaster welcoming Damian to the academy.

Maps and Damian Wayne encounter an adventure led by a "magical" quill pen Maps took from the headmaster's office. In the end, Damian takes the blame for the stolen quill and is expelled.

Olive's mother dies and she, Tristan, Kyle, and Maps attend her funeral. After hearing Olive talk about Tristan and discovering he is a Man-Bat, Kyle and Maps search Tristan's dorm room. Tristan finds them, transforms into a Man-Bat, and flies out the window. They find him wounded and take him to a professor. Kyle finds Olive, tells her about Tristan, and they kiss. After Kyle leaves, Olive finds a letter from her mother under the dock.

=== Second Semester: Issues #1-12 ===
Olive stays at Gotham Academy for in-between semester break while all other attendees, including the detective club, return home. Olive's new roommate, Amy, arrives and Olive begrudgingly gives her a tour. Amy convinces Olive to let out her anger by vandalizing the chapel. They then run into Eric who has the key to the chapel. When he has an asthma attack, Amy takes Eric's backpack with his inhaler and traps Olive and Eric. Eric and Olive eventually escape the chapel and regain Eric's inhaler.

After the break, students start disappearing, including one of Kyle's tennis teammates. Later, Maps is putting up advertisements for club services and discovers the missing students are part of the "Witch Club". Maps and Kyle are hypnotized by the leader of the club. The Detective Club discovers Maps is gone and suspect the witch club has taken her. The Detective Club witnesses the Witch Club perform a ritual that involves collecting books from campus. They discover members have been hypnotized by small circuit boards in their hats. Colton and Pomeline travel to the shop room to find tools to reverse engineer the circuit boards. While there, they discuss Colton's crush on Kyle. When a teacher enters the room, Colton distracts him and is caught. The Detective Club stops the ritual and un-hypnotizes members of the Witch Club. During the ritual, they see symbols from the lost Book of Old Gotham. The leader of the Witch Club, who calls herself Haxan, turns out to be Prof. Pio, a teacher at the academy. As a result of his trouble making, Colton is expelled.

As a flashback to the previous issue, Colton is shown to have uncovered numerous secret passageways when attempting to avoid being caught in the shop room. He discovers Mr. Scarlet, also known as The Bookworm, a villain in the 1960s Batman TV show, drawing on a map. When Mr. Scarlet is not looking, he takes the map and on his way out, he runs into the headmaster. The headmaster claims it is his map and Colton is expelled from the academy. Pomeline calls her mom, who is a lawyer, and delays Colton's expulsion to schedule a trial that will determine Colton's fate. Eric is shown to have acquired a cape etched with symbols. During the trial, Pomeline leaves with Tristan along with the map from the trial and they discover etchings from the lost Book of Old Gotham in the Wedgewood Museum. Maps, Olive, and Amy go looking for Pomeline while Kyle decides to look for Colton, who has gone missing during a break in the trial. Eric is shown to be eavesdropping on Pomeline and Tristan when they are discussing the location of the lost Book of Gotham.

Back inside the Wedgewood Museum, Pomeline and Tristan use the map and follow symbols to find the Book of Old Gotham. Kyle follows Colton to his hidden trailer in the woods to persuade him to return to the trial. Colton reveals that he is abused by his parents and cannot return home. He also tells Kyle that he has a crush on him. A secret passage within a tomb leads Pomeline and Tristan to a large area with many tunnels which lead to various places in the academy. They find a keyhole in an Arkham Asylum symbol in the floor and Pomeline is revealed to have the key. Eric jumps forward from the shadows, where he has been following Pomeline and Tristan and declares he is a sort-of villain named "The Symbolist". He attacks them just as Pomeline turns the key and the ground falls. As the rest of The Detective Club suddenly appears, Eric pushes Tristan off the ledge.

Amy persuades Olive to push Eric off in response to his attack on Tristan, supposedly killing him. When Olive tries to tell The Detective Club about Amy's persuasion, she realizes that Amy is a figment of her imagination and she flees. Tristan flies up from the base, holding onto Eric. While Kyle, Maps, Tristan, and Eric return to the academy, Colton and Pomeline stumble across a cavern filled with riches where Pomeline finds the Book of Old Gotham and discovers that Olive is an Arkham. The Bookworm, who has been following Pom and Colton curses them and steals the Book of Old Gotham. Back in Olive's dorm, Amy transforms into the spirit of Amity Arkham. After hearing Batman discuss her mother's experiences with the same spirit, she becomes enraged with the secrecy and begins to transform into Calamity, like her mother.

Possessed with the spirit of Amity Arkham, Olive begins to attack Batman. Back inside the tunnels, Bookworm explains to Colton and Pom that Amity Arkham was burned as a witch and cursed a number of families responsible for her death. Pomeline's ancestor, Alienor Frych, had noted the names of everyone involved in The Book of Old Gotham. Bookworm recites a spell that summons Amity's spirit to kill Pomeline and Colton but friendship between Amity and Alienor causes the spell to backfire, which enables Pom and Colton to escape. When the two return to the surface, Olive reads the names of the cursed families from The Book of Old Gotham and disappears.

As students evacuate the academy, The Detective Club plans to save Olive from Amity Arkham. Kyle decides to not get involved because he has been offered an opportunity to play tennis at another school. Olive tracks down Two-Face, as his family name is inscribed in The Book of Old Gotham and attacks him with fire. As Colton, Pom, and Maps look for the Bones of Amity Arkham, they are attacked by three students in a shark, fox, and raven masks and trapped in a well quickly filling with water. Luckily, they escape thanks to Colton. Back at the academy, they discover that the students with masks are part of a secret society named "The Terrible Trio" who conceal an important secret of the academy. When Olive discovers that Two-Face has been hurt by Gotham as well, they both plot to attack The Penguin, whose surname is also in The Book of Old Gotham.

As Olive and Two-Face fight The Penguin, Kyle arrives to save Olive and is injured. In order to discover the secrets of the academy, Maps attempts to join "The Terrible Trio" but is attacked by them instead. The fox in the trio is revealed to be related to Ambroos Lydecker who vowed to protect the spirit of Amity.

Maps blames Olive for Kyle's injuries, ruining their friendship. Kyle awakens from his injured state and warns Maps that secrets about Calamity are contained in the Wayne Manor Vault can save Olive. Maps, Colton, and Pom decide to venture to the Manor but Colton and Pom are captured by Two-Face and his goons, who are looking for the Cobblepot Family Treasure. Maps stumbles across Damian Wayne and they knock out Two-Face. Maps, Colton, and Pom are forced to leave without information from the vault, as they are trespassing. However, as they are leaving, Damian Wayne, disguised as Robin, gives them a box of papers concerning Millie Jane Cobblepot. The gang sees Gotham, set on fire by Olive, and Robin convinces Maps to go after Olive.

== Characters ==
=== Main characters ===
- Olive Silverlock: A second year student at Gotham Academy and the series' main protagonist whose mother was once a Gotham super-villain named Calamity before being put in Arkham Asylum by Batman. Olive harbors resentment towards the Dark Knight due to this experience. Following a period of absence, she reentered Gotham Academy, grappling with a newfound sense of depression. She found herself distanced from many of her former friends, except for her loyal best friend and underclassman, Maps, as well as her ex-boyfriend, Kyle. Like her mother, Sybil Silverlock, Olive appears to have white hair and reddish eyes. Olive is part of the detective club formed at Gotham Academy. Over the course of the series she slowly develops pyrokinesis similar to her mom.
- Mia "Maps" Mizoguchi: Kyle's younger sister, Maps, is not only Olive's closest companion but also an inquisitive underclassman. Possessing a bright outlook, Maps holds a deep admiration for Gotham City's superheroes. Her fascination with urban exploration and cartography, which earned her the nickname, is quite pronounced. She is also a known friend of Damian Wayne, who attends Gotham Academy in issue #7. She is part of a detective club, formed at Gotham Academy that includes Olive, Kyle, and other students.
- Pomeline Fritch: An occultist and Olive's on-again, off-again friend, Pomeline, also known as "Pom", is directly involved with some of Gotham Academy's mysterious ghost sightings, and teams up with Olive to put the spirits to rest in issues #1–6 of Gotham Academy. She formerly dated Heathcliff until he dropped out. Pomeline is also a member of the detective club, a club formed at the academy by Maps Mizoguchi and other students.
- Colton Rivera: Dubbed the "school liar" by Olive, Colton Rivera is not only a prankster but also the primary supplier of illicit fireworks at Gotham Academy. Colton's skill set extends to lock-picking and various other practical talents. He is an integral member of the detective club, a group established within the academy. Colton's constant accessory, his signature black sunglasses, serves as a distinctive feature that sets him apart. It has been heavily implied throughout the series that Colton has a crush on Kyle Mizoguchi, Olive's ex-boyfriend and Maps' older brother. Colton was expelled from Gotham Academy in Gotham Academy: Second Semester #3.
- Kyle Mizoguchi: Olive's ex-boyfriend and Maps' older brother, Kyle is a tennis prodigy. Although he and Olive have broken up, he is still concerned for her well-being, especially as her outings and emotional state affect his little sister. Kyle is a member of the detective club, a club at the academy founded by his sister, Maps and other students.
- Tristan Grey: Gotham Academy's mysterious new student, he is infected with a virus that causes him to turn occasionally into a half-bat creature. He and Olive are romantically interested in each other.
- Sybil Silverlock: Olive's mother and fire-based super-villain, Calamity who was put in Arkham Asylum by Batman. She is one of Batman's most mysterious adversaries, who was put into a coma after the collapse of Arkham Asylum.
- Eric Jørgensen / The Symbolist: A paranoid student at Gotham Academy who is mostly seen drawing in his notebook or sometimes even helping the detective club with their investigations.
- Heathcliff Ray: A dropout student who was the road manager for Black Canary. Heathcliff formerly dated Pomeline.
- Amy: Olive's new roommate who appeared in Gotham Academy: Second Semester #1. Amy is described as a stereotypical "tough girl" and has a lack of empathy for other characters in the series.
- Katherine Karlo: A student at Gotham Academy and Maps's friend who appears frequently throughout the series. In Gotham Academy #10, it was discovered that Katherine is Clayface's daughter.

=== Other characters ===
- Isla MacPherson: A history teacher at Gotham Academy.

== Reception ==
Gotham Academy received positive reviews since its beginning. IGN called the first issue "Great", saying that "Gotham Academy offers a fresh take on the Bat mythos, driven by Karl Kerschl's fantastic art". Newsarama gave it a 9 out of 10: "If this is a mark of where the 'new' New 52 is going, then the Bat-Signal is shining a little brighter this week". The series and it's successors have also been praised by Davey Nieves and Diego Higurera of Comics Beat.

== Collected editions ==
Title	Material collected	Publication date	ISBN
Gotham Academy, Vol. 1: Welcome To Gotham Academy	Gotham Academy #1-6	17 June 2015	978-1401254728
Gotham Academy, Vol. 2: Calamity	Gotham Academy #7-12	16 March 2016	978-1401256814
Gotham Academy, Vol. 3: Yearbook	Gotham Academy #13-18, Gotham Academy Annual #1	2 November 2016	978-1401264789
Gotham Academy: Second Semester, Vol. 1: Welcome Back	Gotham Academy: Second Semester #1-3, #5-8	19 July 2017	978-1401271190
Gotham Academy: Second Semester, Vol. 2: The Ballad of Olive Silverlock	Gotham Academy: Second Semester #4, #9-12	29 November 2017	978-1401274740
Gotham Academy	Gotham Academy #1-18, Gotham Academy Annual #1	9 May 2023	978-1779521712
