= List of films based on magazine articles =

This is a list of films based on non-fiction articles published in periodicals such as magazines or newspapers. See also List of films based on short fiction.

- Adaptation – "Orchid Fever", The New Yorker, January 23, 1995 – Susan Orlean
- All the President's Men – "GOP Security Aide Among Five Arrested in Bugging Affair", The Washington Post, 1972 – Bob Woodward & Carl Bernstein
- Almost Famous – "The Allman Brothers Story", Rolling Stone, December 6, 1973 – Cameron Crowe
- American Gangster – "The Return of Superfly", New York, August 14, 2000 – Mark Jacobson
- Argo – "How the CIA Used a Fake Sci-Fi Flick to Rescue Americans From Tehran", Wired, April 2007 – Joshuah Bearman
- Bad Education – “The Bad Superintendent”, New York, September 17, 2004 – Robert Kolker
- Beautiful Boy – "My Addicted Son", New York Times, February 6, 2005 – David Sheff
- A Beautiful Day in the Neighborhood – "Can You Say Hero", Esquire, November 1998 – Tom Junod
- Bernie – “Midnight in the Garden of East Texas”, Texas Monthly, January 1998 – Skip Hollandsworth
- Bigger Than Life – "Ten Feet Tall", The New Yorker, September 10, 1955 – Berton Roueche
- Biker Boyz – "Biker Boyz", New Times Los Angeles, April 2000 – Michael Gougis
- The Bling Ring – "The Suspects Wore Louboutins", Vanity Fair, March 2010 – Nancy Jo Sales
- Blue Crush – "Life's Swell", Women Outside, September 1998 – Susan Orlean
- Boogie Nights – "The Devil and John Holmes", Rolling Stone, May 1989 – Mike Sager
- The Butler – "A Butler Well Served by this Election", The Washington Post, November 7, 2008 – Wil Haygood
- City by the Sea – "Mark of a Murderer", Esquire, September 1997 – Michael McAlary
- Coyote Ugly – "The Muse of the Coyote Ugly Saloon", GQ, March 1997 – Elizabeth Gilbert
- Coyote Vs. Acme — "Coyote V. Acme", The New Yorker, February 26, 1990 — Ian Frazier
- Dallas Buyers Club – "Buying time: World traveler Ron Woodroof smuggles drugs — and hope — for people with AIDS", Dallas Morning News, August 9, 1992 – Bill Minutaglio
- Dark Waters – "The Lawyer Who Became DuPont's Worst Nightmare", New York Times, January 6, 2016 – Nathaniel Rich
- Deepwater Horizon – “Deepwater Horizon’s Final Hours”, New York Times, December 25, 2010 – David Barstow, David Rohde, and Stephanie Saul
- Dog Day Afternoon – "The Boys in the Bank", Life, September 22, 1972 – P. F. Kluge & Thomas Moore
- The Fast and the Furious – "Racer X", Vibe, May 1998 – Kenneth Li
- Fear and Loathing in Las Vegas – "Fear and Loathing in Las Vegas", Rolling Stone, November 11 & November 25, 1971 – Hunter S. Thompson
- Four Good Days – "How's Amanda? A Story of Truth, Lies and an American Addiction", Washington Post, July 23, 2016, – Eli Saslow
- Hustlers – "The Hustlers at Scores" New York Magazine, December 28, 2015 – Jessica Pressler
- In Cold Blood – "In Cold Blood: The Last to See Them Alive"' The New Yorker, September 25, 1965 – Truman Capote
- The Insider – "The Man Who Knew Too Much", Vanity Fair, May 1996 – Marie Brenner
- Into the Wild – "Death of an Innocent", Outside, January 1993 – Jon Krakauer
- Kill the Messenger – Dark Alliance, San Jose Mercury News, 1996 – Gary Webb
- The Killing Fields – "The Death and Life of Dith Pran", The New York Times Magazine, January 20, 1980 – Sydney Schanberg
- Ladybug Ladybug – "They Thought the War Was On!", McCall's, April 1963 – Lois Dickert
- Live Free or Die Hard – "A Farewell to Arms", Wired, May 1997 – John Carlin
- A Nightmare on Elm Street – "Medical Experts Seek Clues to ‘Nightmare Deaths’ That Strike Male Asian Refugees", Los Angeles Times, January 11, 1987 – Larry Doyle
- Only the Brave – "No Exit", GQ, September 27, 2013 – Sean Flynn
- Our Friend – "The Friend: Love Is Not a Big Enough Word", Esquire, May 10, 2015 – Matthew Teague
- Pain and Gain – Series of articles in Miami New Times – Pete Collins
- Perfect – Series of articles in Rolling Stone – Aaron Latham
- The Perfect Storm – "The Storm", Outside Magazine, October 1994 – Sebastian Junger
- Primetime – "Tonight on Dateline This Man Will Die", Esquire, September 2007 – Luke Dittrich
- A Private War – "Marie Colvin's Private War" Vanity Fair, August 2012 – Marie Brenner
- Proof of Life – "Adventures in the Ransom Trade" Vanity Fair, May 1998 – William Prochnau
- Pushing Tin – "Something's Got to Give", The New York Times Magazine, March 24, 1996 – Darcy Frey
- Radio – "Someone to Lean On", Sports Illustrated, December 16, 1996 – Gary Smith
- Rio — "A Rare Bird Flies Home For Good", The Washington Post December 25, 2002 — Shankar Vedantam
- Saturday Night Fever – "Tribal Rites of the New Saturday Night", New York, June 7, 1976 – Nik Cohn
- Searching For Bobby Fischer – "Fathering a Chess Prodigy", The New York Times Magazine, July 21, 1985 – Fred Waitzkin
- The Sessions – "On Seeing a Sex Surrogate " The Sun Magazine, May 1990– Mark O'Brien
- Shattered Glass – "Shattered Glass ", Vanity Fair, September 1998 – Buzz Bissinger
- Spare Parts – "La Vida Robot", Wired, April 2005 – Joshua Davis
- Spotlight – "Church Allowed Abuse by Priest for Years", Boston Globe, January 6, 2002– Boston Globe Spotlight Team
- Top Gun – "Top Guns", California, May 1983 – Ehud Yonay
- Tower – "96 Minutes", Texas Monthly, 2006 – Pamela Colloff
- Urban Cowboy – "The Ballad of the Urban Cowboy: America's Search for True Grit", Esquire, September 12, 1978 – Aaron Latham
- War Dogs – "The Stoner Arms Dealers: How Two American Kids Became Big-Time Weapons Traders", Rolling Stone, March 16, 2011 – Guy Lawson

== See also ==
- Lists of film source material
