= Karl Kerschl =

Canadian comic book artist

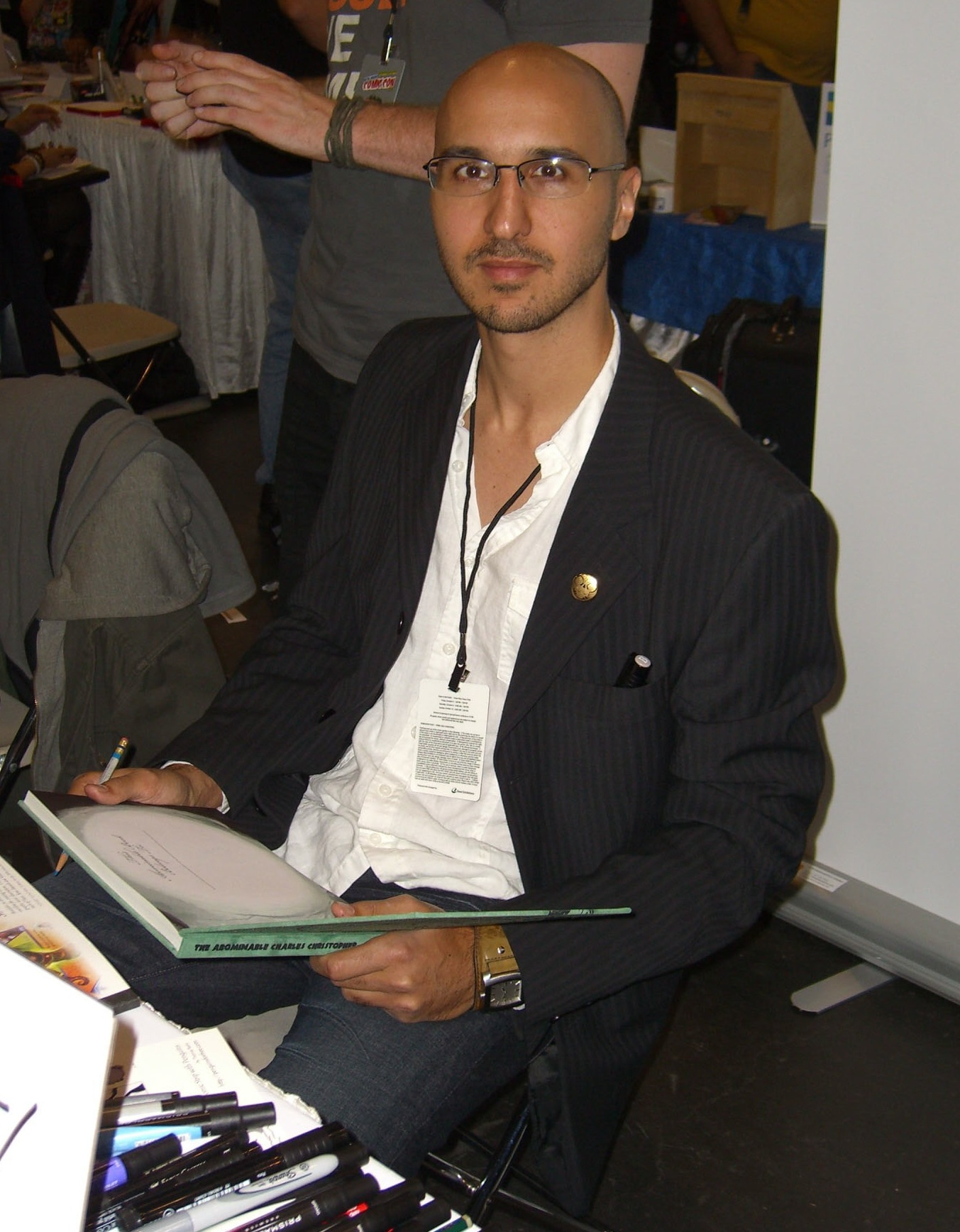
- Kerschl at the New York Comic Con in Manhattan, October 9, 2010
- Born: Toronto, Ontario, Canada
- Area: Artist
- Notable works: The Ambassadors; Majestic; The Abominable Charles Christopher; All-Flash; Adventures of Superman; Teen Titans: Year One; Gotham Academy

Karl Kerschl is a Canadian comic book artist. He is best known for his work on DC Comics books, including Adventures of Superman, Majestic, All-Flash, Teen Titans: Year One and Gotham Academy.

== Early life ==
Kerschl was born in Toronto and raised in Niagara Falls. He attended the Ontario College of Art for a year before deciding to practice on his own, discovering and improving his own storytelling and drawing styles in the process.

== Career ==
Kerschl has worked on various series for DC Comics, including Adventures of Superman, Majestic, All-Flash #1 and Teen Titans: Year One.

On June 20, 2007, Kerschl began the weekly webcomic The Abominable Charles Christopher, which follows the adventures of a dim but gentle sasquatch-like creature and his forest friends who must defend their woods from threats by humans. It has been praised by critics, and has won a Joe Shuster Award in 2010, a nomination for an Eisner Award in 2010, and won an Eisner in 2011. It has been collected in two deluxe limited hardcover volumes.

== Awards ==
- 2010 Joe Shuster Award for Outstanding WebComic Creator/Creative Team
- 2010 Eisner Award for Best Digital Comic (nominated)
- 2011 Eisner Award for Best Digital Comic (won)

== Personal life ==
Kerschl currently lives in Montreal, Quebec.

== Bibliography ==
=== DC Comics ===
- 52 #47
- Action Comics #806, 811
- Action Comics #30
- Adventures of Superman #624, 640–646, 648–649
- All-Flash
- Assassin's Creed: The Fall #1–3
- Batman #119-121
- Batman: Black and White #4
- Batman/Superman #10-11
- Batman: The Brave and the Bold #10-12
- DC's Saved by the Belle Reve
- Gotham Academy #1–6, 8
- Gotham Academy: Second Semester #1–3, 5–12
- Majestic #1–3
- Robin #148
- Superman #201
- Superman Returns Prequel #2
- Superman: The Man of Steel #128
- Swamp Thing Annual #1
- Teen Titans #100
- Teen Titans: Year One #1–6
- The Flash: The Fastest Man Alive #3
- Wonder Woman #219
- Wonder Woman 75th Anniversary Special #1

=== IDW Publishing ===
- G.I. Joe: Snake Eyes – Deadgame #5

=== Image Comics ===
- The Ambassadors #2

=== Marvel Comics ===
- Daily Bugle #1–3
- Deadpool #56
- Generation X #56
- Iceman #1–2, 4
- Weapon X: The Draft – Sauron #1
- X-Men: Prelude to Perdition #1
  - X-Men 2: The Movie Adaptation (tpb, 144 pages, 2003, ISBN 0-7851-1162-X) includes:
    - X-Men 2 Movie Prequel: Nightcrawler (with Chuck Austen, one-shot, 2003)

=== Other publishers ===
- The Abominable Charles Christopher
- Assassin's Creed: The Chain (UbiWorkshop)
- Assassin's Creed: Brahman (UbiWorkshop)
