= Assassin's Creed: The Chain =

2012 graphic novel

- Date: 9 August 2012
- Main characters: Nikolai Orelov, Innokenti Orelov, Daniel Cross
- Series: Assassin's Creed
- Page count: 96 pages
- Publisher: UbiWorkshop

Creative team
- Writers: Cameron Stewart; Karl Kerschl
- Artists: Cameron Stewart; Karl Kerschl
- Pencillers: Cameron Stewart; Karl Kerschl
- Letterers: Serge LaPointe
- Colourists: Tyson Hesse
- ISBN: 978-2-924006-05-4

Chronology
- Preceded by: Assassin's Creed: The Fall
- Followed by: Assassin's Creed: Brahman

Assassin's Creed: The Chain is a graphic novel published by UbiWorkshop in August 2012. Set in the Assassin's Creed universe, it is a sequel to the comic book miniseries, Assassin's Creed: The Fall, and concludes the story of Russian Assassin Nikolai Orelov following his retirement from the Brotherhood and emigration to the United States in the early 20th century. The framing story, set in 2002, follows Nikolai's descendant Daniel Cross, a Templar who unwittingly experiences his ancestors' memories.

The book is written and illustrated by Cameron Stewart and Karl Kerschl, who also worked on The Fall and would later return for the graphic novel Assassin's Creed: Brahman, which features a new setting and protagonist. A video game set in-between the events of The Fall and The Chain, Assassin's Creed Chronicles: Russia, was released in February 2016.

== Plot synopsis ==
Following his betrayal of the Assassin Brotherhood, Nikolai Orelov, fearing for his family's safety, decided to emigrate to the United States, but only managed to keep his son Innokenti with him, as his wife and daughter were deported back to Russia during the Palmer Raids. One day, an Assassin named Sergei visits Nikolai at his secluded cabin to demand that he return to the Brotherhood to tell them of his experiences with the Pieces of Eden. Nikolai flatly refuses and, when Sergei threatens Innokenti's safety, Nikolai murders him. Knowing that the Assassins will send more men after them, Nikolai begins to train Innokenti so that he could defend himself, teaching him that he "shouldn't flinch in the face of death". When the Assassins eventually come after Nikolai, many of them are killed by a trap set in the Orelovs' cabin, with Nikolai and Innokenti hunting down the rest. However, Nikolai is shot in the legs and captured by the last surviving Assassin. Remembering his training, Innokenti reluctantly fires a bullet through his father's back, killing both him and the Assassin. He then retrieves Nikolai's hidden blade from his body.

In the modern-day, in 2002, these memories are being involuntarily relived by Innokenti's grandson Daniel Cross, who is suffering from the "Bleeding Effect" due to his use of the Animus. Daniel, who has become somewhat of a hero among the Templars for his role in the purge of the Assassins Brotherhood two years prior, is now a fully-fledged member of the Templar Order, which he has come to see as his family. Eventually, Daniel is inducted into the Templars' Inner Sanctum, and is sent to investigate a hidden library built by Ivan the Terrible, which has been used as a vault by the Assassins for centuries. Daniel infiltrates the library and finds Ezio Auditore da Firenze's codex, which contains a written recording of a message intended for someone named Desmond. (Note: This is Minerva's message to Desmond, transmitted through Ezio at the end of Assassin's Creed II, in which she warns him about the end of the world in 2012.) He informs the other Templars of his findings before going to a church in Moscow, where he meets with Nadya Orelov, Innokenti's sister and Daniel's great-aunt. Nadya, unaware of Daniel's identity, remarks his resemblance to her own son and deduces that he is not from Russia due to the Latin cross he is wearing. Daniel claims that he has come to Moscow to "visit family", to which Nadya tells him that there are no stronger ties than those of blood.

== Collected editions ==
Both The Fall and The Chain were collected in Assassin's Creed: Subject Four, a 208-page trade paperback that was include in Assassin's Creed 3: The Ubiworkshop Edition , along with Assassin's Creed: Encyclopedia.
