= Assassin's Creed: The Fall =

Comic book mini-series based on Ubisoft's Assassin's Creed

Publication information
- Publisher: Wildstorm
- Schedule: Monthly
- Format: Limited series
- Genre: Action/adventure
- Publication date: November 2010 – January 2011
- No. of issues: 3
- Main character(s): Nikolai Orelov, Daniel Cross

Creative team
- Written by: Cameron Stewart; Karl Kerschl
- Artist(s): Cameron Stewart; Karl Kerschl
- Penciller(s): Cameron Stewart; Karl Kerschl
- Letterer(s): Studio Lounak; Serge LaPointe
- Colorist: Nadine Thomascov

Collected editions
- Assassin's Creed: The Fall: ISBN 0857684930

Assassin's Creed: The Fall is an American comic book three-issue mini-series published by WildStorm. Set in the Assassin's Creed universe, it tells the story of Nikolai Orelov, a member of the Russian Brotherhood of Assassins, who battles Templar influence in Russia in the late 19th and early 20th centuries. The miniseries also features a framing story, taking place from 1998 to 2000, which follows Nikolai's descendant Daniel Cross as he explores his ancestor's genetic memories while trying to learn more about his own past and the history of the Assassins.

Written and illustrated by Cameron Stewart and Karl Kerschl, the series was initially going to be an expansion of the travels of Ezio Auditore da Firenze, but was moved to an entirely new setting to provide greater freedom to the writers. However, the story still follows the millennia-old conflict between the Assassins and the Templars, which is central to the Assassin's Creed franchise. It also incorporates several events from Russian history like the Borki train disaster, the Tunguska explosion, and the Russian Revolution.

The first issue of the comic was released on November 10, 2010, a few days before the retail debut of Assassin's Creed: Brotherhood. It was followed by the second issue on December 1, 2010, and the third on January 12, 2011. Stewart and Kerschl later worked on a graphic novel sequel to the comic, titled Assassin's Creed: The Chain, which was published by UbiWorkshop in August 2012. A video game set in-between the events of The Fall and The Chain, Assassin's Creed Chronicles: Russia, was released in February 2016.

== Plot synopsis ==
The comic intercuts between events in Nikolai Orelov's life from 1888 to 1917, and his great-grandson Daniel Cross, who struggles with Nikolai's memories that he can inexplicably relive.

=== Nikolai ===
In 1888, Nikolai Orelov is having reservations about the Assassin life as he recalls the death of his friend and fellow Assassin Aleksandr Ulyanov, who was executed one year prior after a failed attempt to kill Tsar Alexander III. He voices his doubts to his pregnant wife Anna, remarking that his father chose this life for him and he never had a say in the matter, but Anna encourages him to carry on for the sake of their unborn child. On October 29, the Brotherhood sends Nikolai to assassinate the Tsar as the latter is traveling from Crimea to Saint Petersburg on the imperial train. Nikolai boards the train and is shocked to find the entire Royal family aboard, having been told the Tsar was traveling alone. He is then ambushed by Alexander and, in the ensuing fight, the train is derailed, injuring both Nikolai and the Tsar. After getting his family to safety, Alexander retrieves the Imperial Sceptre and defeats Nikolai with it, although he spares the Assassin's life so that his children would not have to witness a violent murder.

In 1908, Nikolai, now bitter and more brutal in his methods after having lost his child, tortures a captured Templar for the whereabouts of the Imperial Sceptre, which the Brotherhood has discovered to be a powerful Piece of Eden. After the Templar reveals that the Sceptre is kept at a research facility in Siberia, the Brotherhood devises a plan to retrieve it and destroy the facility with the help of their ally, Nikola Tesla. On June 30, Nikolai and two other Assassins storm the facility to retrieve the Sceptre, which is being experimented on by the Templars, while Tesla prepares to release a powerful burst of electricity from Wardenclyffe Tower to destroy the facility. However, the Assassins are unable to get to the Sceptre in time and the artifact is hit by the electricity, destroying it and causing a massive explosion that leaves Nikolai as the sole survivor.

In 1917, during the Russian Revolution, Nikolai's friend Vladimir Lenin writes to him, asking him to assassinate Tsar Nicholas II, the last symbol of imperialism in Russia. Nikolai infiltrates Nicholas' residence, but rather than kill the Tsar, he demands that he hand over the Imperial Sceptre in his possession. Upon seeing the Sceptre, Nikolai quickly deduces it to be a replica and destroys it. Nicholas, remembering Nikolai from their brief encounter on the imperial train three decades ago, asks him to spare his family, but Nikolai reveals he has no intention to kill the Tsar or his family and prepares to leave. Before he does, Nicholas informs him that the late Grigori Rasputin wore a necklace which was seemingly made of the same material as the real Sceptre. Deciding to investigate this lead, Nikolai digs up Rasputin's body and retrieves his necklace, discovering it to be a shard of the destroyed Sceptre. He then returns to Anna and their young daughter Nadya as the family prepares to start a new life abroad, far from the Revolution and the Assassins.

=== Daniel ===
In 1998, petty criminal Daniel Cross, struggling with his addiction to drugs and alcohol and violent outbursts, is forced to attend court-ordered therapy sessions and take prescription medication for his hallucinations. After he stops taking his medication, his psychiatrist calls him out for it during one of their sessions, but Daniel chooses to ignore him and heads to a local bar. When one of Nikolai's memories kicks in, Daniel becomes deranged and attacks a man who tried to help him, mistaking him for a Templar, but is stopped by the Assassin Hannah Mueller. Mistaking Daniel for an Assassin, Hannah reprimands him for breaking the Creed and takes him away to her camp near Philadelphia, Pennsylvania.

At the Assassin camp, Daniel meets its director, Paul Bellamy, who reveals there are no records of Daniel being a member of the Brotherhood despite him having the Assassins' logo tattooed on his arm. At that moment, another one of Nikolai's memories kicks in, causing Daniel to speak Russian and bring up Tunguska. The Assassins demand an explanation, but an annoyed and confused Daniel starts a fight, causing him to be subdued and returned to his cabin. Later that night, Daniel, unable to keep his hallucinations under control, convinces Hannah to help him leave the camp so that he can go to his apartment and retrieve his medication. Upon finding that Daniel has thrown away all his medication, Hannah comforts him and tells him that the Assassins might help him unlock whatever is locked away in his mind, just as Bellamy arrives, having discovered Daniel is Nikolai's descendant. As Daniel begins involuntarily reliving Nikolai's mission in Tunguska, he attacks Bellamy and attempts to flee but is eventually cornered by Hannah and Bellamy. Daniel collapses, claiming that he has finally learned his purpose: to find the Assassins' Mentor.

Over the following two years, Daniel, now an official member of the Brotherhood, travels across the globe to search for clues to the Mentor's whereabouts, finally managing to secure a meeting with him in November 2000. Daniel is sedated by two Assassins in his room and awakens in the Mentor's office in Dubai. After the Mentor reveals that he has been observing Daniel's progress and tells him about his own role in the Brotherhood, he presents Daniel with a Hidden Blade. This triggers something in Daniel's brain and he impulsively stabs the Mentor with the blade, killing him. Confused and horrified by his own actions, Daniel escapes by leaping out of the office window into the water below. It is then revealed that Daniel is, in fact, a sleeper agent who was brainswashed at age 7 to kill the Mentor when the opportunity presents itself, as well as Subject 4, a former test subject for Abstergo Industries' Animus, where he was forced to relive Nikolai's memories to benefit the Templars, giving him his hallucinations.

As the Assassins discover the aftermath of the Mentor's assassination and Hannah is informed of Daniel's betrayal, the Templars take advantage of the Brotherhood's weakened state to launch a worldwide purge against the Assassins, crippling them. Meanwhile, Daniel returns to Abstergo, the only place he feels would welcome him, and demands to be put back in the Animus to freely explore Nikolai's memories.

== Collected editions ==
The comic has been collected into a trade paperback:

- Assassin's Creed: The Fall (128 pages, Panini Comics, Italian language edition, January 2011, ISBN 8865894024, Titan Books, November 2013, ISBN 0857684930)
- The Fall Deluxe Edition was a softcover special edition that brought all three issues of The Fall, plus an exclusive 10-page epilogue, which would also act as transition towards the next comic saga, Assassin's Creed: The Chain. This edition had a total of 128 pages, including the exclusive epilogue and a making-of section.

Both The Fall and The Chain were later collected in Assassin's Creed: Subject Four, a 208-page trade paperback that was include in Assassin's Creed 3: The Ubiworkshop Edition, along with Assassin's Creed: Encyclopedia.
