= List of novels based on video games =

The following is a list of novels based on video games.

== A ==
Based on	Title	Author(s)	Pub. date	Publisher	Original language	ISBN	Notes
Alan Wake	Alan Wake	Rick Burroughs	May 25, 2010	Tor Books	English	978-0765366474	Novelization of Alan Wake.
Alien: Isolation	Alien: Isolation	Keith R. A. DeCandido	July 30, 2019	Titan Books	English	978-1789093070	Novelization of Alien: Isolation.
Anarchy Online	Prophet Without Honour: Anarchy Online Book One	Ragnar Tørnquist	2001	Funcom	English	978-8299596107	Published digitally for free on the game's official website.
Assassin's Creed	Assassin's Creed: Renaissance	Oliver Bowden	November 26, 2009	Penguin Books	English	978-0141046303	Novelization of Assassin's Creed II centering on Ezio Auditore da Firenze.
Assassin's Creed	Assassin's Creed: Brotherhood	Oliver Bowden	November 25, 2010	Penguin Books	English	978-0241951712	Novelization of Assassin's Creed: Brotherhood centering on Ezio Auditore da Firenze.
Assassin's Creed	Assassin's Creed: The Secret Crusade	Oliver Bowden	June 23, 2011	Penguin Books	English	978-0241951729	Novelization and expansion of the events of Assassin's Creed, Bloodlines and Revelations centering on Altaïr Ibn-La'Ahad.
Assassin's Creed	Assassin's Creed: Revelations	Oliver Bowden	November 24, 2011	Penguin Books	English	978-0241951736	Novelization of Assassin's Creed: Revelations centering on Ezio Auditore da Firenze.
Assassin's Creed	Assassin's Creed: Forsaken	Oliver Bowden	December 4, 2012	Penguin Books	English	978-0718159498	Tie-in to Assassin's Creed III centering on the game's main antagonist, Haytham Kenway.
Assassin's Creed	Assassin's Creed: Black Flag	Oliver Bowden	November 7, 2013	Penguin Books	English	978-0425262962	Novelization and expansion of the events of Assassin's Creed IV: Black Flag centering on Edward Kenway.
Assassin's Creed	Assassin's Creed: Unity	Oliver Bowden	November 20, 2014	Penguin Books	English	978-0425279731	Tie-in to Assassin's Creed Unity centering on Élise de la Serre.
Assassin's Creed	Assassin's Creed: Underworld	Oliver Bowden	November 5, 2015	Penguin Books	English	978-1405918862	Prequel to and novelization of Assassin's Creed Syndicate centering on Jayadeep Mir.
Assassin's Creed	Assassin's Creed: Last Descendants	Matthew J. Kirby	August 30, 2016	Scholastic	English	978-0545855518	First in a trilogy of young adult novels with an original narrative unconnected to the video games.
Assassin's Creed	Assassin's Creed: Last Descendants – Tomb of the Khan	Matthew J. Kirby	December 27, 2016	Scholastic	English	978-0545855532	
Assassin's Creed	Assassin's Creed: Last Descendants – Fate of the Gods	Matthew J. Kirby	December 26, 2017	Scholastic	English	978-1338163957	
Assassin's Creed	Assassin's Creed: Heresy	Christie Golden	November 15, 2016	Ubisoft Publishing	English	978-1945210020	
Assassin's Creed	Assassin's Creed: Origins – Desert Oath	Oliver Bowden	October 10, 2017	Ubisoft Publishing	English	978-1945210280	Prequel to Assassin's Creed Origins.
Assassin's Creed	Assassin's Creed: Odyssey	Gordon Doherty	October 5, 2018	Ace Books	English	978-1405939737	Novelization of Assassin's Creed Odyssey, depicting the game's intended canon story path.
Assassin's Creed	Assassin's Creed: The Ming Storm	Yan Leisheng	March 31, 2019	New Star Press (CHN); Aconyte Books (US)	Chinese	978-1839080883	First in a planned trilogy of Chinese-language non-canon novels focusing on Shao Jun.
Assassin's Creed	Assassin's Creed: The Desert Threat	Yan Leisheng	October 4, 2021	New Star Press (CHN); Aconyte Books (US)	Chinese	978-1839081729	Sequel to The Ming Storm.
Assassin's Creed	Assassin's Creed: Valhalla – Geirmund's Saga	Matthew J. Kirby	November 10, 2020	Aconyte Books	English	978-1839080609	Tie-in to Assassin's Creed Valhalla.
Assassin's Creed	Assassin's Creed: Fragments – The Blade of Aizu	Olivier Gay	April 15, 2021	404 Éditions (FR); Titan Books (US)	French	979-1032404164	First in a trilogy of French-language young adult novels.
Assassin's Creed	Assassin's Creed: Fragments – The Highlands Children	Alain T. Puysségur	September 16, 2021	404 Éditions (FR); Titan Books (US)	French	979-1032404188	
Assassin's Creed	Assassin's Creed: Fragments – The Witches of the Moors	Adrien Tomas	January 20, 2022	404 Éditions (FR); Titan Books (US)	French	979-1032404171	No English translation has been published.
Assassin's Creed	刺客信条: 长安望 (Cìkè Xìntiáo: Cháng'ān Wàng)	Sui Shi	March 25, 2022	Starfish (CHN)	Chinese	978-7521733303	First in The Imperial Jade Seal planned series of ten Chinese-language novels. No English translation has been published.
Assassin's Creed	Assassin's Creed: Valhalla – Sword of the White Horse	Elsa Sjunneson	April 5, 2022	Aconyte Books	English	978-1839081408	Tie-in and sequel to Assassin's Creed Valhalla.
Assassin's Creed	Assassin's Creed: The Engine of History – The Magus Conspiracy	Kate Heartfield	August 16, 2022	Aconyte Books	English	978-1839081675	
Assassin's Creed	Assassin's Creed: The Engine of History – The Resurrection Plot	Kate Heartfield	July 4, 2023	Aconyte Books	English	1839082356	Sequel to The Engine of History – The Magus Conspiracy.
Assassin's Creed	Assassin's Creed: The Golden City	Jaleigh Johnson	May 2, 2023	Aconyte Books	English	978-1839082221	Set between Assassin's Creed Mirage and Valhalla.
Assassin's Creed	Assassin's Creed: Mirage – Daughter of No One	Maria Lewis	November 21, 2023	Aconyte Books	English	978-1839082801	Prequel to Assassin's Creed Mirage.

== B ==
Based on	Title	Author(s)	Pub. date	Publisher	Original language	ISBN	Notes
Baldur's Gate	Baldur's Gate: A Novelization	Philip Athans	July 1999	Wizards of the Coast	English	978-0786915255	
Baldur's Gate	Baldur's Gate II: Shadows of Amn	Philip Athans	September 2000	Wizards of the Coast	English	978-0786915699	
Baldur's Gate	Baldur's Gate II: Throne of Bhaal	Drew Karpyshyn	September 2001	Wizards of the Coast	English	978-0786919857	
Baldur's Gate	Baldur's Gate III: Astarion	T. Kingfisher	September 29, 2026	Random House Worlds	English	979-8217298594	
The Bard's Tale	The Bard's Tale: Castle of Deception	Mercedes Lackey, Josepha Sherman	July 1992	Baen Books	English	978-0671721251	
The Bard's Tale	The Bard's Tale: Fortress of Frost and Fire	Mercedes Lackey, Ru Emerson	April 1993	Baen Books	English	0671721623	
The Bard's Tale	The Bard's Tale: The Chaos Gate	Josepha Sherman	April 1994	Baen Books	English	978-0671875978	
The Bard's Tale	The Bard's Tale: Prison of Souls	Mercedes Lackey, Mark Shepherd	November 1994	Baen Books	English	978-0671721930	
The Bard's Tale	A Bard's Tale: Thunder of the Captains	Holly Lisle, Aaron Allston	July 1996	Baen Books	English	978-0671877316	
The Bard's Tale	A Bard's Tale: Wrath of the Princes	Holly Lisle, Aaron Allston	March 1997	Baen Books	English	978-0671877712	
The Bard's Tale	A Bard's Tale: Escape from Roksamur	Mark Shepherd	August 1997	Baen Books	English	978-0671877972	
The Bard's Tale	The Bard's Tale: Curse of the Black Heron	Holly Lisle	March 1998	Baen Books	English	978-0671878689	
The Bard's Tale	The Bard's Tale	Nathan Long	2018		English		Novelization of the first three games.
The Bard's Tale	The Destiny Knight	Nathan Long	2018		English		Novelization of the first three games.
The Bard's Tale	The Thief of Fate	Nathan Long	2018		English		Novelization of the first three games.
The Bard's Tale	Paladin	Elizabeth Watasin	2018		English		Tie-in to The Bard's Tale IV.
The Bard's Tale	Promises Made by Moonlight	Mike Lee	2018		English		Tie-in to The Bard's Tale IV.
The Bard's Tale	The Song Thief	Jason Denzel	2018		English		Tie-in to The Bard's Tale IV.
Bases Loaded	Worlds of Power: Bases Loaded II: Second Season	A. L. Singer	1991	Scholastic	English	978-0590443128	
Batman: Arkham	Batman: Arkham Knight – The Riddler's Gambit	Alex Irvine	June 23, 2015	Titan Books	English	978-1783292516	Prequel to Batman: Arkham Knight.
Batman: Arkham	Batman: Arkham Knight – The Official Novelization	Marv Wolfman	July 21, 2015	Titan Books	English	978-1783292523	
Batman: Rise of Sin Tzu	Batman: Rise of Sin Tzu	Devin Grayson, Flint Dille	2003	Aspect	English	978-0446613927	Novelization of the game.
Battlefield	Battlefield 3: The Russian	Andy McNab, Peter Grimsdale	October 25, 2011	Swordfish	English	978-1455508921	
Battlefield	Battlefield 4: Countdown to War	Peter Grimsdale	October 24, 2013	Orion Publishing	English	978-1409151289	
Berlin Connection	Berlin Connection: Gefährliches Spiel (EN: My Dangerous Game – The Diary of Roger Penrose)	Hartmut Mechtel	1999	eku interactive	German	N/A	Sequel to Berlin Connection (part 1) in combination with online diaries.
Bionic Commando	Worlds of Power: Bionic Commando	Judith Bauer Stamper	1991	Scholastic	English	0590443151	
BioShock	BioShock: Rapture	John Shirley	July 19, 2011	Tor Books	English	978-0765367358	Prequel to BioShock.
BioShock	BioShock Infinite: Mind in Revolt	Joe Fielder, Ken Levine	February 13, 2013	Amazon Services	English	ASIN B00B2SO7NU	Prequel to BioShock Infinite; hardcover version released as The Psychology of Dissent: Interviews with the Anarchist Daisy Fitzroy.
Blaster Master	Worlds of Power: Blaster Master	A. L. Singer	1990	Scholastic	English	059043778X	
Borderlands	Borderlands: The Fallen	John Shirley	November 22, 2011	Pocket Books	English	978-1439198476	
Borderlands	Borderlands: Unconquered	John Shirley	September 25, 2012	Pocket Books	English	978-1439198483	
Borderlands	Borderlands: Gunsight	John Shirley	October 1, 2013	Pocket Books	English	978-1439198490	
Borderlands	Borderlands: Debt or Alive	Anthony Burch	June 25, 2024	Titan Books	English		
Bot Colony	Bot Colony	Eugene Joseph	2010	North Side	English	978-0986580406	
Brothers in Arms	Brothers in Arms: Hell's Highway	John Antal	2008	Presidio Press	English	9780345503374	
Brute Force	Brute Force: Betrayals	Dean Wesley Smith	2002	Del Rey Books	English	978-0345458506	Prequel to the game.

== C ==
Based on	Title	Author(s)	Pub. date	Publisher	Original language	ISBN	Notes
Castlevania	Worlds of Power: Castlevania II: Simon's Quest	Christopher Howell	1990	Scholastic	English	0590437755	
Command & Conquer	Command & Conquer: Tiberium Wars	Keith R. A. DeCandido	2005	Random House	English	978-0345498144	
Crimson Skies	Crimson Skies	Eric Nylund, Michael B. Lee, Nancy Berman, Eric S. Trautmann	2002	Del Rey Books	English	978-0345458742	
Crusader Kings	Crusader Kings II: Tales of Treachery	Tomas Härenstam, Lee Battersby, Luke Bean, Jordan Ellinger, James Erwin, Axel Kylander, Cory Lachance, James Mackie, M. Harold Page, Aaron Rosenberg, Steven Savile, Anderson Scott, Joseph Sharp	2014	Paradox Interactive	English	978-9187687587	Short story anthology collection.
Crysis	Crysis: Legion	Peter Watts	2011	Del Rey Books	English	978-0345526786	Novelization of Crysis 2.
Crysis	Crysis: Escalation	Gavin Smith	2013	Gollancz	English	978-0575115705	Collection of short stories set between Crysis 2 and 3.

== D ==
Based on	Title	Author(s)	Pub. date	Publisher	Original language	ISBN	Notes
Darksiders	Darksiders: The Abomination Vault	Ari Marmell	2012	Del Rey Books	English	978-0345534026	
Dead Island	Dead Island	Mark Morris	2011	Transworld Digital	English	978-0857501035	
Dead Space	Dead Space: Martyr	B. K. Evenson	2010	Tor Books	English	978-0765325037	
Dead Space	Dead Space: Catalyst	B. K. Evenson	2012	Tor Books	English	978-0857681768	
Death Stranding	Death Stranding: The Official Novelization – Volume 1	Hitori Nojima	2021	Titan Books	English	978-1789095760	
Death Stranding	Death Stranding: The Official Novelization – Volume 2	Hitori Nojima	2021	Titan Books	English	978-1789095784	
Defender	Defender: Hyperswarm	Tim Waggoner	2004	iBooks	English	978-0743493109	Sequel to the 2002 video game.
Descent	Descent	Peter Telep	1999	Avon	English	0-380-79306-7	
Descent	Descent: Stealing Thunder	Peter Telep	1999	Avon	English	0-380-79307-5	
Descent	Descent: Equinox	Peter Telep	1999	Avon	English	0-380-79308-3	
Desert Strike	Desert Strike	Andy Smith	1992	Future	English	1872666272	Part of Sega's Sega Power novel series.
Deus Ex	Deus Ex: Icarus Effect	James Swallow	2011	Del Rey Books	English	978-0345523594	Side-story to Deus Ex: Human Revolution.
Deus Ex	Deus Ex: Fallen Angel	James Swallow	2013		English		Included with some editions of Deus Ex: Human Revolution – Director's Cut.
Deus Ex	Deus Ex: Black Light	James Swallow	2016	Del Rey Books	English	978-1785651205	Prequel to Deus Ex: Mankind Divided.
Deus Ex	Deus Ex: Hard Line	James Swallow	2016		English	978-1785654831	Included with some editions of Deus Ex: Mankind Divided.
Diablo	Diablo: Demonsbane	Robert B. Marks	2000		English	978-0743418997	Digital novella, later reprinted in the Diablo Archive.
Diablo	Diablo: Legacy of Blood	Richard A. Knaak	2001	Pocket Books	English	978-0671041557	
Diablo	Diablo: The Black Road	Mel Odom	2002	Pocket Books	English	978-0743426916	Reprinted in the Diablo Archive.
Diablo	Diablo: The Kingdom of Shadow	Richard A. Knaak	2002	Pocket Books	English	978-0743426923	Reprinted in the Diablo Archive.
Diablo	Diablo: Moon of the Spider	Richard A. Knaak	2006	Pocket Books	English	978-0743471329	Reprinted in the Diablo Archive.
Diablo	Diablo: The Sin War Book 1: Birthright	Richard A. Knaak	2006	Pocket Books	English	978-0743471220	
Diablo	Diablo: The Sin War Book 2: Scales of the Serpent	Richard A. Knaak	2007	Pocket Books	English	978-0743471237	
Diablo	Diablo: The Sin War Book 3: The Veiled Prophet	Richard A. Knaak	2007	Pocket Books	English	978-0743471244	
Diablo	Diablo III: The Order	Nate Kenyon	2012	Gallery Books	English	978-1416550785	
Diablo	Diablo III: Heroes Rise, Darkness Falls	Various	2012	Pocket Star	English	978-1416550907	Short story anthology collection.
Diablo	Diablo III: Storm of Light	Nate Kenyon	2014	Gallery Books	English	978-1416550808	
Diablo	Diablo III: Morbed	Micky Neilson	2014	Pocket Star	English	978-1476789460	Digital novella.
Diablo	Diablo: Tales from the Horadric Library	Various	2022	Titan Books	English	978-1950366798	Anthology book.
Diablo	Diablo III: Book of Cain			Insight Editions	English	978-1608870455	Labelled as being authored by Deckard Cain, a fictional character.
Diablo	Diablo III: Book of Tyrael			Insight Editions	English	978-1608872794	Labelled as being authored by Tyrael, a fictional character.
The Dig	The Dig	Alan Dean Foster		Aspect	English	978-4073073598	
Dishonored	Dishonored: The Corroded Man	Adam Christopher	2016	Titan Books	English	978-1783293049	
Dishonored	Dishonored: The Return of Daud	Adam Christopher	2018	Titan Books	English	978-1783293056	
Dishonored	Dishonored: The Veiled Terror	Adam Christopher	2018	Titan Books	English	978-1789090376	
Tom Clancy's The Division	Recruited	Thomas Parrott		Aconyte	English	978-1839081163	
Tom Clancy's The Division	Compromised	Thomas Parrott		Aconyte	English	978-1839081163	
Donkey Kong	Donkey Kong Country	Michael Teitelbaum	1995	Troll Communications	English	0816737312	
Donkey Kong	Donkey Kong Country: Rescue on Crocodile Isle	Michael Teitelbaum	1996	Troll Communications	English	0816742707	
Donkey Kong	Donkey Kong Country: Rumble in the Jungle	Michael Teitelbaum	1996	Troll Communications	English	0816738726	
Doom	Doom: Knee Deep In The Dead	Dafydd ab Hugh, Brad Linaweaver		Pocket Star	English	978-0671525552	
Doom	Doom: Hell on Earth	Dafydd ab Hugh, Brad Linaweaver		Pocket Star	English	978-0671525620	
Doom	Doom: Infernal Sky	Dafydd ab Hugh, Brad Linaweaver		Pocket Star	English	978-0671525637	
Doom	Doom: Endgame	Dafydd ab Hugh, Brad Linaweaver		Pocket Star	English	978-0671525668	
Doom	Doom 3: Worlds on Fire	Matthew Costello	2008	Pocket Books	English	978-1416549802	
Doom	Doom 3: Maelstrom	Matthew Costello	2009	Pocket Books	English	978-1416553854	
Dragon Age	Dragon Age: The Stolen Throne	David Gaider	2009	Tor Books	English	978-0765363718	Prequel to Dragon Age: Origins.
Dragon Age	Dragon Age: The Calling	David Gaider		Tor Books	English	978-0765324092	Prequel to Dragon Age: Origins.
Dragon Age	Dragon Age: Asunder	David Gaider		Tor Books	English	978-0765331175	
Dragon Age	Dragon Age: The Masked Empire	Patrick Weekes	2014	Tor Books	English	978-0765331182	
Dragon Age	Dragon Age: Last Flight	Liane Merciel	2014	Tor Books	English	978-0765337214	
Dragon Age	Dragon Age: Hard in Hightown	Mary Kirby	2018	Dark Horse Books	English	978-1506704043	
Dragon Age	Dragon Age: Tevinter Nights	Patrick Weekes, John Epler, Brianne Battye, Courtney Woods, Ryan Cormier, Sylvia Feketekuty		Tor Books	English	9780765337221	Short story anthology collection.
Dragon Quest	Dragon Quest III: The Unknown Legend		1988	Enix	Japanese	978-4900527003	Short story collection.
Dragon Quest	Dragon Quest Story	Hideo Takayashiki	1989	Enix	Japanese	978-4900527072	
Dragon Quest	Dragon Quest Story II: Gods of Evil Vol. 1	Hideo Takayashiki	1989	Enix	Japanese	978-4900527171	
Dragon Quest	Dragon Quest Story II: Gods of Evil Vol. 1	Hideo Takayashiki	1989	Enix	Japanese	978-4900527188	
Dragon Quest	Dragon Quest Monster Story		1989	Enix	Japanese	978-4900527089	Short story collection.
Dragon Quest	Dragon Quest IV: The Unknown Legend		1990	Enix	Japanese	978-4900527485	Short story collection.
Driver	Driver: Nemesis	Alex Sharp		Transworld Publishers	English	978-0552163965	Based on Driver: San Francisco.

== E ==
Based on	Title	Author(s)	Pub. date	Publisher	Original language	ISBN	Notes
The Elder Scrolls	The Infernal City: An Elder Scrolls Novel	Greg Keyes	2009	Del Rey	English	978-0345508010	
The Elder Scrolls	Lord of Souls: An Elder Scrolls Novel	Greg Keyes	2011	Del Rey	English	978-0345508027	
Elemental: War of Magic	Elemental: Destiny's Embers	Bradley Wardell		Del Rey Books	English	978-0345517869	Set after the events of the game.
Elite	Elite: The Dark Wheel	Robert Holdstock	1984	Acornsoft	English		Novella packaged with the original game.
Elite	Elite: Mostly Harmless	Kate Russell, Heather Murphy		CreateSpace Independent Publishing Platform	English	ASIN B00KUXT3DC	
Elite	Elite: Reclamation	Drew Wagar, Heather Murphy		CreateSpace Independent Publishing Platform	English	9781909163324	
Elite	Elite: Lave Revolution	Allen Stroud, Heather Murphy		CreateSpace Independent Publishing Platform	English	ASIN B00KVER5IA	
Elite	Elite: And Here The Wheel	John Harper, Heather Murphy		CreateSpace Independent Publishing Platform	English	9781909163355	
Elite	Elite: Tales from the Frontier	Various		CreateSpace Independent Publishing Platform	English	ASIN B00KZ2DLPO	
Elite	Elite: Out of the Darkness	T. James		CreateSpace Independent Publishing Platform	English	ASIN B00MZD32JQ	
Elite	Elite: Wanted	Gavin Deas		CreateSpace Independent Publishing Platform	English	978-1473201286	
Elite	Elite: Docking Is Difficult	Gideon Defoe		CreateSpace Independent Publishing Platform	English	978-1473201309	
Elite	Elite: Nemorensis	Simon Spurrier		CreateSpace Independent Publishing Platform	English	978-1473201262	
Enchanter	Enchanter	Robin W. Bailey	1989	Avon Books	English	978-0380753864	
Tom Clancy's EndWar	Tom Clancy's: EndWar	David Michaels		Berkley	English	978-0425222140	
Tom Clancy's EndWar	Tom Clancy's EndWar: The Hunted	David Michaels		Berkley	English	978-0425237717	
Tom Clancy's EndWar	Tom Clancy's EndWar: The Missing	Peter Telep		Berkley	English	978-0425266298	
Eternal Champions	Eternal Champions 1: The Cyber Warriors	Jamie Thompson		Puffin	English	978-0140904086	
Eternal Champions	Eternal Champions 2: Citadel of Chaos	Jamie Thompson		Fantail	English	978-0140904093	
Eve Online	EVE: The Empyrean Age	Tony Gonzales		Tor Books	English	978-0765363909	
Eve Online	EVE: The Burning Life	Hjalti Danielsson		Tor Books	English	978-0765325297	
Eve Online	EVE: Templar One	Tony Gonzales		Tor Books	English	978-0765326195	
EverQuest	Rogue's Hour	Scott Ciencin		CDS Books	English	9781593150204	
EverQuest	Ocean of Tears	Stewart Wieck		CDS Books	English	9781593150297	
EverQuest	Truth and Steel	Thomas M. Reid		CDS Books	English	9781593152239	
EverQuest	Blood Red Harp	Elain Cunningham		CDS Books	English	9781593152246	

== F ==
Based on	Title	Author(s)	Pub. date	Publisher	Original language	ISBN	Notes
Fable	Fable: The Balverine Order	Peter David		Ace	English	978-0441020065	
Fable	Fable: Blood Ties	Peter David		Ace	English	978-1937007409	
Fable	Fable: Edge of the World	Christie Golden		Del Rey	English	978-0345539373	Based on Fable: The Journey.
Fable	Fable: Blood of Heroes	Jim C. Hines		Del Rey	English	978-0345542342	Based on Fable Legends.
Far Cry	Far Cry: Absolution	Urban Waite		Titan Books	English	978-1945210297	Prequel to Far Cry 5.
Far Cry	Götterdämmerung (English: Twilight of the Gods)	Michael T. Bhatty		Panini Verlags	German	978-3833215681	Based on Far Cry.
Far Cry	Blutige Diamanten (English: Blood Diamonds)	Michael T. Bhatty		Panini Verlags	German	978-3833217425	Based on Far Cry 2.
Final Fantasy	Final Fantasy I * II * III: Memory of Heroes	Takashi Umemura		Yen On	Japanese	9781975382391	Novelization of the first three Final Fantasy games.
Final Fantasy	Final Fantasy VII: On the Way to a Smile	Kazushige Nojima		Yen On	Japanese	9781975382353	
Final Fantasy	Final Fantasy VII: The Kids are Alright – A Turks Side Story	Kazushige Nojima		Yen On	Japanese	9781975382360	
Final Fantasy	Final Fantasy XIII: Episode Zero – Promise	Jun Eishima		Yen On	Japanese	9781975382407	
Final Fantasy	Final Fantasy XIII-2: Fragments Before	Jun Eishima		Yen On	Japanese	9781975382377	
Final Fantasy	Final Fantasy XIII-2: Fragments After	Jun Eishima		Yen On	Japanese	9781975382384	
Final Fantasy	Final Fantasy XV: The Dawn of the Future	Jun Eishima		Square Enix Books	Japanese	9781646090006	
Final Fantasy	Final Fantasy VII Remake: Traces of Two Pasts	Kazushige Nojima		Square Enix Books	Japanese	978-1646091775	
Five Nights at Freddy's	Five Nights at Freddy's: The Silver Eyes	Scott Cawthon, Kira Breed-Wrisley		Scholastic	English	978-1338134377	
Five Nights at Freddy's	Five Nights at Freddy's: The Twisted Ones	Scott Cawthon, Kira Breed-Wrisley		Scholastic	English	978-1338139303	Sequel to The Silver Eyes.
Five Nights at Freddy's	Five Nights at Freddy's: The Fourth Closet	Scott Cawthon, Kira Breed-Wrisley		Scholastic	English	978-1338139327	Sequel to The Twisted Ones.
Five Nights at Freddy's	Five Nights at Freddy's: Fazbear Frights #1: Into the Pit	Scott Cawthon, Elley Cooper		Scholastic	English	978-1338576016	First in the Fazbear Frights anthology series.
Five Nights at Freddy's	Five Nights at Freddy's: Fazbear Frights #2: Fetch	Scott Cawthon, Andrea Waggener, Carly Anne West		Scholastic	English	978-1338576023	
Five Nights at Freddy's	Five Nights at Freddy's: Fazbear Frights #3: 1:35 AM	Scott Cawthon, Elley Cooper, Andrea Waggener		Scholastic	English	978-1338576030	
Five Nights at Freddy's	Five Nights at Freddy's: Fazbear Frights #4: Step Closer	Scott Cawthon, Elley Cooper, Kelly Parra, Andrea Waggener		Scholastic	English	978-1338576054	
Five Nights at Freddy's	Five Nights at Freddy's: Fazbear Frights #5: Bunny Call	Scott Cawthon, Elley Cooper, Andrea Waggener		Scholastic	English	978-1338576047	
Five Nights at Freddy's	Five Nights at Freddy's: Fazbear Frights #6: Blackbird	Scott Cawthon, Kelly Parra, Andrea Waggener		Scholastic	English	978-1338703894	
Five Nights at Freddy's	Five Nights at Freddy's: Fazbear Frights #7: The Cliffs	Scott Cawthon, Elley Cooper, Andrea Waggener		Scholastic	English	978-1338703917	
Five Nights at Freddy's	Five Nights at Freddy's: Fazbear Frights #8: Gumdrop Angel	Scott Cawthon, Andrea Waggener		Scholastic	English	978-1338739985	
Five Nights at Freddy's	Five Nights at Freddy's: Fazbear Frights #9: The Puppet Carver	Scott Cawthon, Elley Cooper		Scholastic	English	978-1338739992	
Five Nights at Freddy's	Five Nights at Freddy's: Fazbear Frights #10: Friendly Face	Scott Cawthon, Andrea Waggener		Scholastic	English	978-1338741193	
Five Nights at Freddy's	Five Nights at Freddy's: Fazbear Frights #11: Prankster	Scott Cawthon, Elley Cooper, Andrea Waggener		Scholastic	English	978-1338741209	
Five Nights at Freddy's	Five Nights at Freddy's: Fazbear Frights #12: Felix the Shark	Scott Cawthon, Elley Cooper, Kelly Parra, Andrea Waggener		Scholastic	English	978-1338804553	
Five Nights at Freddy's	Five Nights at Freddy's: Tales from the Pizzaplex #1: Lally's Game	Scott Cawthon, Kelly Parra, Andrea Waggener		Scholastic	English	978-1338827309	First in the Tales from the Pizzaplex anthology series.
Five Nights at Freddy's	Five Nights at Freddy's: Tales from the Pizzaplex #2: Happs	Scott Cawthon, Elley Cooper, Andrea Waggener		Scholastic	English	978-1338831696	
Five Nights at Freddy's	Five Nights at Freddy's: Tales from the Pizzaplex #3: Somniphobia	Scott Cawthon, Kelly Parra, Andrea Waggener		Scholastic	English	978-1338831672	
Five Nights at Freddy's	Five Nights at Freddy's: Tales from the Pizzaplex #4: Submechanophobia	Scott Cawthon, Kelly Parra, Andrea Waggener		Scholastic	English	978-1338851410	
Five Nights at Freddy's	Five Nights at Freddy's: Tales from the Pizzaplex #5: The Bobbiedots Conclusion	Scott Cawthon, Andrea Waggener		Scholastic	English	978-1338851434	
Five Nights at Freddy's	Five Nights at Freddy's: Tales from the Pizzaplex #6: Nexie	Scott Cawthon, Kelly Parra, Andrea Waggener		Scholastic	English	978-1338871340	
Five Nights at Freddy's	Five Nights at Freddy's: Tales from the Pizzaplex #7: Tiger Rock	Scott Cawthon, Andrea Waggener		Scholastic	English	978-1338871364	
Five Nights at Freddy's	Five Nights at Freddy's: Tales from the Pizzaplex #8: B-7 2	Scott Cawthon, Kelly Parra, Andrea Waggener		Scholastic	English	978-1338873986	
Five Nights at Freddy's	Five Nights at Freddy's: VIP	Scott Cawthon, E.C. Myers		Scholastic	English		
Five Nights at Freddy's	Five Nights at Freddy's: The Week Before	Scott Cawthon, E.C. Myers		Scholastic	English		Prequel to Five Nights at Freddy's.
Five Nights at Freddy's	Five Nights at Freddy's: Return to the Pit	Scott Cawthon, Adrienne Kress		Scholastic	English		

== G ==
Based on	Title	Author(s)	Pub. date	Publisher	Original language	ISBN	Notes
Gabriel Knight	Gabriel Knight: Sins of the Fathers	Jane Jensen		Roc	English	978-0451456076	
Gabriel Knight	The Beast Within: A Gabriel Knight Mystery	Jane Jensen		Roc	English	978-0451456212	
Game Trivia Catechism	Game Trivia Catechism	Thuyen Nguyen		Createspace Independent Publishing Platform	English	978-1543101768	Based on the homebrew Nintendo DS game.
Gauntlet	Gauntlet: Dark Legacy – Paths of Evil	Richard C. White		iBooks	English	9780743493055	
Gears of War	Aspho Fields	Karen Traviss		Orbit	English	978-0345499431	Set between Gears of War and Gears of War 2.
Gears of War	Jacinto's Remnant	Karen Traviss		Orbit	English	978-1841497389	Sequel to Gears of War 2.
Gears of War	Anvil Gate	Karen Traviss		Orbit	English	978-0345499455	Follow-up to Gears of War: Jacinto's Remnant.
Gears of War	Coalition's End	Karen Traviss		Orbit	English	978-1439184042	Set between Gears of War: Anvil Gate and Gears of War 3.
Gears of War	The Slab	Karen Traviss		Orbit	English	978-0356501055	Prequel to Gears of War.
Gex	Gex	Michael Teitelbaum		Troll Communications	English	0816731993	
Tom Clancy's Ghost Recon	Tom Clancy's: Ghost Recon	David Michaels		Berkley		978-0425220146	
Tom Clancy's Ghost Recon	Tom Clancy's Ghost Recon: Combat Ops	David Michaels		Berkley		978-0425240069	
Tom Clancy's Ghost Recon	Tom Clancy's Ghost Recon: Choke Point	Peter Telep		Berkley		978-0425264751	
Tom Clancy's Ghost Recon	Tom Clancy's Ghost Recon Wildlands: Dark Waters	Richard Dansky		Ubisoft Publishing		9781945210037	
God of War	God of War	Matthew Stover, Robert E. Vardeman		Del Rey	English	978-0345508676	
God of War	God of War II	Robert E. Vardeman		Del Rey	English	978-0345508683	
God of War	God of War: The Official Novelization	J.M. Barlog, Cory Barlog		Titan Books	English	1789090148, 9781789090154	Novelization of the 2018 video game.
Golden Axe	Golden Axe	Andy Smith		Future	English	1872666108	Part of Sega's Sega Power novel series.
Guild Wars	Guild Wars: Ghosts of Ascalon	Matt Forbeck, Jeff Grubb		Pocket Star	English	978-1416589471	
Guild Wars	Guild Wars: Edge of Destiny	J. Robert King		Pocket Star	English	978-1416589600	
Guild Wars	Guild Wars: Sea of Sorrow	Ree Soesbee		Pocket Star	English	978-1416589624	

== H ==
Based on	Title	Author(s)	Pub. date	Publisher	Original language	ISBN	Notes
Tom Clancy's H.A.W.X	Tom Clancy's: HAWX	David Michaels		Berkley	English	978-0425233191	Prequel to Tom Clancy's H.A.W.X.
Halo	The Fall of Reach	Eric S. Nylund		Gallery Books	English	978-0765367297	
Halo	The Flood	William C. Dietz		Gallery Books	English	978-0765367303	
Halo	First Strike	Eric S. Nylund		Gallery Books	English	1841494224	
Halo	Ghosts of Onyx	Eric S. Nylund		Gallery Books	English	0765315688	
Halo	Contact Harvest	Joseph Staten		Gallery Books	English	0765315696	
Halo	The Cole Protocol	Tobias S. Buckell		Gallery Books	English	978-0765315700	
Halo	Cryptum	Greg Bear		Gallery Books	English	978-0765323965	Known together as the Forerunner Saga.
Halo	Primordium	Greg Bear		Gallery Books	English	978-0765323972	Known together as the Forerunner Saga.
Halo	Silentium	Greg Bear		Gallery Books	English	978-0230758322	Known together as the Forerunner Saga.
Halo	Glasslands	Karen Traviss		Gallery Books	English	978-0765330406	Known together as the Kilo-Five Trilogy.
Halo	The Thursday War	Karen Traviss		Gallery Books	English	978-0765323941	Known together as the Kilo-Five Trilogy.
Halo	Mortal Dictata	Karen Traviss		Gallery Books	English	978-0765323958	Known together as the Kilo-Five Trilogy.
Halo	Broken Circle	John Shirley		Gallery Books	English	978-1476783598	
Hell: A Cyberpunk Thriller	Hell: A Cyberpunk Thriller	Chet Williamson		Prima Lifestyles	English	9780761500698	
Hellgate: London	Hellgate: Exodus (Book 1)	Mel Odom		Pocket Star	English	1416525793	
Hellgate: London	Hellgate: Goetia (Book 2)	Mel Odom		Pocket Star	English	1416525807	
Hellgate: London	Hellgate: Covenant (Book 3)	Mel Odom		Pocket Star	English	1416525815	
Hitman	Hitman: Enemy Within	William C. Dietz		Del Rey	English	978-0345471321	Set between Hitman 2: Silent Assassin and Hitman: Contracts.
Hitman	Hitman: Damnation	Raymond Benson		Del Rey	English	978-0345471345	Prequel to Hitman: Absolution.
Höhlenwelt-Saga (EN: Cave World Saga)	Die Bruderschaft von Yoor (English: The Brotherhood of Yoor)	Harald Evers		Heyne	German	9783453178977	First plotline.
Höhlenwelt-Saga (EN: Cave World Saga)	Leandras Schwur (English: Leandra's Oath)	Harald Evers		Heyne	German	9783453179028	First plotline.
Höhlenwelt-Saga (EN: Cave World Saga)	Der dunkle Pakt (English: The Dark Pact)	Harald Evers		Heyne	German	9783453188174	First plotline.
Höhlenwelt-Saga (EN: Cave World Saga)	Das magische Siegel (English: The Magic Seal)	Harald Evers		Heyne	German	9783453213784	First plotline.
Höhlenwelt-Saga (EN: Cave World Saga)	Die Schwestern des Windes (English: The Sister of the Winds)	Harald Evers		Heyne	German	9783453869615	Second plotline.
Höhlenwelt-Saga (EN: Cave World Saga)	Die Mauer des Schweigens (English: The Wall of Silence)	Harald Evers		Heyne	German	9783453877801	Second plotline.
Höhlenwelt-Saga (EN: Cave World Saga)	Die Monde von Jonissar (English: The Moons of Jonissar)	Harald Evers		Heyne	German	9783453530119	Second plotline.
Höhlenwelt-Saga (EN: Cave World Saga)	Die Magie der Höhlenwelt (English: The Magic of the Cave World)	Harald Evers		Heyne	German	9783453530577	Second plotline.
Homefront	Homefront: The Voice of Freedom	Raymond Benson, John Milius		Del Rey	English	978-0345527158	

== I ==
Based on	Title	Author(s)	Pub. date	Publisher	Original language	ISBN	Notes
Ico	Ico: Castle in the Mist	Miyuki Miyabe		Haikasoru	Japanese	978-1421540634	
Infiltrator	Worlds of Power: Infiltrator	A. L. Singer	1991	Scholastic	English	0590443143	
Infinity Blade	Infinity Blade: Awakening	Brandon Sanderson		Amazon	English	ASIN B005SFRJ6K	Available only in E-book format.
Infinity Blade	Infinity Blade: Redemption	Brandon Sanderson		Amazon	English	9780983943020	Available only in E-book format.

== J ==
Based on	Title	Author(s)	Pub. date	Publisher	Original language	ISBN	Notes
Judge Dredd: Dredd vs. Death	Dredd Vs. Death	Gordon Rennie		Rebellion Publishing Limited	English	978-1844160617	

== K ==
Based on	Title	Author(s)	Pub. date	Publisher	Original language	ISBN	Notes
Die Kathedrale	Die Kathedrale: Das Geheimnis einer Rache (English: The Cathedral: The Secret of Revenge)	Harald Evers		F. A. Herbig Verlagsbuchhandlung	German	978-3776617955	
Killzone	Killzone: Ascendancy	Sam Bradbury		Penguin	English	978-0241954317	
King's Quest	The Floating Castle	Craig Mills		Berkley	English	978-1572970090	
King's Quest	Kingdom of Sorrow	Kenyon Morr		Berkley	English	978-1572970335	Kenyon Morr is a pseudonym of Mark Sumner and Marella Sands.
King's Quest	King's Quest 3: See No Weevil	Kenyon Morr		Berkley	English	978-1572971745	Kenyon Morr is a pseudonym of Mark Sumner and Marella Sands.

== L ==
Based on	Title	Author(s)	Pub. date	Publisher	Original language	ISBN	Notes
League of Legends	Ruination: A League of Legends Novel	Anthony Reynolds		Riot Games, Inc.	English	978-0316469050	
The Legend of Zelda	Legend of Zelda: Oracle of Ages	Craig Wessel		Scholastic	English	0439367107	
The Legend of Zelda	Legend of Zelda: Oracle of Seasons	Craig Wessel		Scholastic	English	0439367093	
The Legend of Zelda	Link and the Portal of Doom	Tracey West		Scholastic	English	0439843642	Part of Nintendo's Nintendo Heroes series.
The Lords of Midnight	The Lords of Midnight	Drew Wagar		Fantastic Books	English	978-1-912053-92-6 978-1-912053-91-9	

== M ==
Based on	Title	Author(s)	Pub. date	Publisher	Original language	ISBN	Notes
Magicka	Magicka: The Ninth Element	Dan McGirt, Mattias Johnsson		Paradox Interactive	English	978-9187687181	Prequel to the game.
Mass Effect	Revelation	Drew Karpyshyn		Del Rey	English	978-0345498168	
Mass Effect	Ascension	Drew Karpyshyn		Del Rey	English	978-0345498526	
Mass Effect	Retribution	Drew Karpyshyn		Del Rey	English	978-0345520722	
Mass Effect	Deception	William C. Dietz		Del Rey	English	978-0345520739	
Mass Effect	Andromeda: Nexus Uprising	Jason Hough and K.C. Alexander		Titan Books	English	9781785651564	
Mass Effect	Andromeda: Initiation	N. K. Jemisin and Mac Walters		Titan Books	English	9781785651601	
Mass Effect	Andromeda: Annihilation	Catherynne M. Valente		Titan Books	English	9781785651588	
Mega Man	Worlds of Power: Mega Man 2	Ellen Miles	1990	Scholastic	English	0590437720	
Metal Gear	Worlds of Power: Metal Gear	Alexander Frost	1990	Scholastic	English	0590437771	
Metal Gear	Metal Gear Solid	Raymond Benson		Del Rey	English	0345503287	Novelization of the 1998 video game.
Metal Gear	Metal Gear Solid 2: Sons of Liberty	Raymond Benson		Del Rey	English	0345503430	Novelization of Metal Gear Solid 2: Sons of Liberty.
Metal Gear	Metal Gear Solid: Guns of the Patriots	Project Itoh		Haikasoru	Japanese	978-1421540016	Novelization of Metal Gear Solid 4: Guns of the Patriots.
Metal Gear	Metal Gear Solid: Snake Eater	Satoshi Hase		Kadokawa Shoten (Kadokawa Bunko)	Japanese	978-4041009918	Novelization of Metal Gear Solid 3: Snake Eater.
Metal Gear	Metal Gear Solid: Peace Walker	Hitori Nojima		Kadokawa Shoten (Kadokawa Bunko)	Japanese	978-4041012901	Novelization of Metal Gear Solid: Peace Walker; Hitori Nojima is a pseudonym for Kenji Yano.
Metal Gear	Metal Gear Solid Substance I: Shadow Moses	Hitori Nojima		Kadokawa Shoten (Kadokawa Bunko)	Japanese	978-4041032282	Novelization of Metal Gear Solid.
Metal Gear	Metal Gear Solid Substance II: Manhattan	Hitori Nojima		Kadokawa Shoten (Kadokawa Bunko)	Japanese	978-4041032299	Novelization of Metal Gear Solid 2: Sons of Liberty.
Metal Gear	Metal Gear Solid: The Phantom Pain	Hitori Nojima		Kadokawa Shoten (Kadokawa Bunko)	Japanese	978-4041032305	Novelization of Metal Gear Solid V: The Phantom Pain.
Might and Magic	Might and Magic: The Dreamwright	Geary Gravel		Del Rey	English	0345382927	
Might and Magic	Might and Magic: The Shadowsmith	Bill Fawcett, Various		Del Rey	English	0345382935	
Might and Magic	Might and Magic: The Sea of Mist	Mel Odom		Harper Entertainment	English	0061031631	
Minecraft	The Island	Max Brooks		Del Rey	English	9780399181771	
Minecraft	The Crash	Tracey Baptiste		Del Rey	English	9781473544383	
Minecraft	The Lost Journals	Mur Lafferty		Del Rey	English	9781473544390	
Minecraft	The End	Catherynne M. Valente		Del Rey	English	9780399180729	
Minecraft	The Voyage	Jason Fry		Del Rey	English	9780399180750	
Minecraft	The Mountain	Max Brooks		Del Rey	English		
Minecraft	The Dragon	Nicky Drayden		Del Rey	English		
Minecraft	Mob Squad	Delilah S. Dawson		Del Rey	English		
Minecraft	The Haven Trials	Suyi Davies		Del Rey	English		
Minecraft	Mob Squad: Never Say Nether	Delilah S. Dawson		Del Rey	English		
Minecraft	Zombies!	Nick Eliopulos		Del Rey	English		
Minecraft	Mob Squad: Don't Fear the Creeper	Delilah S. Dawson		Del Rey	English		
Minecraft	Castle Redstone	Sarwat Chadda		Del Rey	English		
Minecraft	Zombies Return!	Nick Eliopulos		Del Rey	English		
Minecraft	The Village	Max Brooks		Del Rey	English		
Minecraft	The Outsider	Danica Davidson		Del Rey	English		
Minecraft	The Tournament	DaVaun Sanders		Del Rey	English		
Minecraft	Zombies Unleashed!	Nick Eliopulos		Del Rey	English		
Minecraft	Journey to the Ancient City	Danny Lore		Del Rey	English		
Minecraft	House of Horrors	Angel Luis Colón		Del Rey	English		
Minecraft	Minecraft Dungenons: Rise of the Arch-Illager	Matt Forbeck		Del Rey	English	9780399180811	
Minecraft	Minecraft Legends: Return of the Piglins	Matt Forbeck		Del Rey	English	978-0-593-355718	
Mortal Kombat	Mortal Kombat	Jeff Rovin		Berkeley	English	978-1572970595	
Myst	Myst: The Book of Atrus	Rand Miller, Robyn Miller, David Wingrove		Hyperion	English	978-0786861590	
Myst	Myst: The Book of Ti'ana	Rand Miller, David Wingrove		Hyperion	English	978-0786861606	
Myst	Myst: The Book of D'ni	Rand Miller, David Wingrove		Hyperion	English	978-0786861613	

== N ==
Based on	Title	Author(s)	Pub. date	Publisher	Original language	ISBN	Notes
NieR	NieR Replicant ver.1.22474487139…: Project Gestalt Recollections--File 01	Jun Eishima, Yoko Taro		Square Enix Books	Japanese	9781646091836	
NieR	NieR:Automata: Long Story Short	Jun Eishima, Yoko Taro		VIZ Media	Japanese	9781974701629	Novelization of the game.
NieR	NieR:Automata: Short Story Long	Jun Eishima, Yoko Taro		VIZ Media	Japanese	9781974701841	Short story collection.
NieR	NieR:Automata: YoRHa Boys	Jun Eishima, Yoko Taro		Square Enix Books	Japanese	9781646090754	
Ninja Gaiden	Worlds of Power: Ninja Gaiden	A. L. Singer	1990	Scholastic	English	0590437763	

== O ==
Based on	Title	Author(s)	Pub. date	Publisher	Original language	ISBN	Notes
Overwatch	Overwatch: Deadlock Rebels	Lyndsay Ely	2021	Scholastic	English	1338740369	
Overwatch	Overwatch: The Hero of Numbani	Nicky Drayden	2020	Scholastic	English	1338633597	
Overwatch	Overwatch 2: Sojourn	Temi Oh	2022	Blizzard Entertainment	English	1956916334	

== P ==
Based on	Title	Author(s)	Pub. date	Publisher	Original language	ISBN	Notes
Perfect Dark	Initial Vector	Greg Rucka		TOR	English	0765315718	
Perfect Dark	Second Front	Greg Rucka		TOR	English	978-0-7653-1572-4	
Planetfall	Planetfall	Arthur Byron Cover	1988	Avon Books	English	978-0380753840	
Planescape: Torment	Planescape: Torment	Ray Vallese, Valerie Vallese		Wizards of the Coast	English	9780786915279	Novelization of the game.
Portal: A Computer Novel	Portal: A Dataspace Retrieval	Rob Swigart	1988	St. Martin's Press	English	978-0595344130 (2005 ed.)	Novelization of the game.
Primal Rage	Primal Rage: The Avatars	John Vornholt		Berkley	English	9781572972308	Novelization of the cancelled sequel to Primal Rage II.
Project Starfighter	Project Starfighter	Stephen J. Sweeny			English	ASIN B00KOSACGU	

== Q ==
Based on	Title	Author(s)	Pub. date	Publisher	Original language	ISBN	Notes
Quantum Break	Quantum Break: Zero State	Cam Rogers	April 5, 2016	Tor Books	English	978-0765391605	Non-canon alternate retelling of the game's story.

== R ==
Based on	Title	Author(s)	Pub. date	Publisher	Original language	ISBN	Notes
Rage	Rage	Matthew J. Costello		Del Rey	English	978-0345529367	
Remember Me	The Pandora Archive	Scott Harrison		Orb Entertainment Limited	English	9780957677715	Prequel to the game.
Resident Evil	The Umbrella Conspiracy (Book 1)	S.D. Perry		Pocket Books	English	0671024396	Based on the 1996 video game.
Resident Evil	Caliban Cove (Book 2)	S.D. Perry		Pocket Books	English	978-0-671-02440-6	
Resident Evil	City Of The Dead (Book 3)	S.D. Perry		Pocket Books	English	0671024418	Based on Resident Evil 2.
Resident Evil	Underworld (Book 4)	S.D. Perry		Pocket Books	English	0671024426	
Resident Evil	Nemesis (Book 5)	S.D. Perry		Pocket Books	English	978-0-671-78496-6	Based on Resident Evil 3: Nemesis.
Resident Evil	Code: Veronica (Book 6)	S.D. Perry		Pocket Books	English	0671784986	Based on Resident Evil – Code: Veronica.
Resident Evil	Zero Hour (Book 0)	S.D. Perry		Pocket Books	English	0671785117	Based on Resident Evil Zero.
Resident Evil	Biohazard: The Beginning	Hiroyuki Ariga		Capcom	Japanese	N/A	Prequel to Resident Evil. Included in the book The True Story Behind BIO HAZARD.
Resident Evil	Biohazard: Hokkai no Yojū	Kyu Asakura		Shueisha (Jump J-Novels)	Japanese	978-4-08-703067-9	
Resident Evil	Biohazard: To the Liberty	Suiren Kimura		Mediaworks (Dengeki Bunko)	Japanese	978-4840220934	Works chosen from among 467 entries in a fan-fiction publishing contest held by Capcom.
Resident Evil	Biohazard: Rose Blank	Tadashi Aizawa		Mediaworks (Dengeki Bunko)	Japanese	978-4840220804	Works chosen from among 467 entries in a fan-fiction publishing contest held by Capcom.
Resistance	Resistance: The Gathering Storm	William C. Dietz		Del Rey	English	0345508424	
Resistance	Resistance: A Hole in the Sky	William C. Dietz		Del Rey	English	978-0345508430	Prequel to Resistance 3.
Return to Krondor	Krondor: The Betrayal (Book 1)	Raymond E. Feist		Harper Voyager	English	0380795272	Known together as The Riftwar Legacy.
Return to Krondor	Krondor: The Assassins (Book 2)	Raymond E. Feist		Harper Voyager	English	0380803232	Known together as The Riftwar Legacy.
Return to Krondor	Krondor: Tear of the Gods (Book 3)	Raymond E. Feist		Harper Voyager	English	0380795280	Known together as The Riftwar Legacy.
Rise of the Robots	Rise of the Robots: The Novel	Jim Murdoch		Roc	English	0451185668	
Road Rash	Road Rash	Neil West		Future	English	1872666124	Part of Sega's Sega Power novel series.
Robot Odyssey	Robot Odyssey I: Escape from Robotropolis	Fred D'Ignazio		TOR	English	031293081X	
Rogue Trooper	The Quartz Massacre	Rebecca Levene		Rebellion Publishing	English	1844161102	
RuneScape	RuneScape: Betrayal at Falador	T.S. Church		Titan Books	English	978-0955907807	
RuneScape	RuneScape: Return to Canifis	T.S. Church		Titan Books	English	978-1848567276	
RuneScape	RuneScape: Legacy of Blood	T.S. Church		Titan Books	English	978-0857687579	

== S ==
Based on	Title	Author(s)	Pub. date	Publisher	Original language	ISBN	Notes
S.T.A.L.K.E.R.	S.T.A.L.K.E.R.: Southern Comfort	John Mason		CreateSpace	English	978-1466220720	
S.T.A.L.K.E.R.	S.T.A.L.K.E.R.: Northern Passage	Balázs Pataki		CreateSpace	English	978-1466473393	
Shadow Keep	Shadowkeep	Alan Dean Foster		Warner Books	English	978-0446325530	
Shadow Warrior	Shadow Warrior: For Dead Eyes Only	Dean Wesley Smith		Pocket Books	English	0671018795	
Shadow Warrior	Shadow Warrior: You Only Die Twice	Ryan Hughes		Pocket Books	English	0671018809	
Shadowgate	Worlds of Power: Before Shadowgate	Ellen Miles	1991	Scholastic	English	978-0590443135	
Shadowkeep	Shadowkeep	Alan Dean Foster	1984	Warner Books	English	978-0446325530	Novelization of the game.
Sid Meier's Alpha Centauri	Centauri Dawn (Book 1)	Michael Ely		Pocket Books	English	978-0671040772	
Sid Meier's Alpha Centauri	Dragon Sun (Book 2)	Michael Ely		Pocket Books	English	978-0671040789	
Sid Meier's Alpha Centauri	Twilight of the Mind (Book 3)	Michael Ely		Pocket Books	English	978-0671040796	
Silent Hill	Silent Hill: Betrayal	Shaun M Jooste		Celenic Earth Publications	English	978-0620731331	
Silent Hill	Silent Hill	Sadamu Yamashita		Konami Digital Entertainment (Konami Novels)	Japanese	978-4861558153	Novelization of Silent Hill.
Silent Hill	Silent Hill 2	Sadamu Yamashita		Konami Digital Entertainment (Konami Novels)	Japanese	978-4861558320	Novelization of Silent Hill 2.
Silent Hill	Silent Hill 3	Sadamu Yamashita		Konami Digital Entertainment (Konami Novels)	Japanese	978-4861558429	Novelization of Silent Hill 3.
Sniper Elite	Spear of Destiny	Jaspre Bark		Abaddon	English	1905437048	
Sniper Elite	Target Hitler	Scott K. Andrews		Abaddon	English	9781781081006	Short story set in the games' universe. Available only in E-book format.
Sonic the Hedgehog	Metal City Mayhem (Book 1, Gamebook)	James Wallis		Penguin Books	English	0140903917	
Sonic the Hedgehog	Zone Rangers (Book 2, Gamebook)	James Wallis		Penguin Books	English	0140903925	
Sonic the Hedgehog	Sonic v Zonik (Book 3, Gamebook)	Nigel Gross, Jon Sutherland		Penguin Books	English	0140904069	
Sonic the Hedgehog	The Zone Zapper (Book 4, Gamebook)	Nigel Gross, Jon Sutherland		Penguin Books	English	0140904077	
Sonic the Hedgehog	Theme Park Panic (Book 5, Gamebook)	Marc Gascoigne, Jonathan Green		Penguin Books	English	0140378472	
Sonic the Hedgehog	Stormin' Sonic (Book 6, Gamebook)	Marc Gascoigne, Jonathan Green		Penguin Books	English	0140378480	
Sonic the Hedgehog	Stay Sonic	Mike Pattenden		Penguin Books	English	9780140903904	
Sonic the Hedgehog	Sonic the Hedgehog in Robotnik's Laboratory (Book 1)	James Wallis, Marc Gascoigne and Carl Sargent		Virgin Publishing	English	0426204018	Written under the collective pseudonym of Martin Adams. Based on the origin established in Stay Sonic.
Sonic the Hedgehog	Sonic the Hedgehog in the Fourth Dimension (Book 2)	James Wallis, Marc Gascoigne and Carl Sargent		Virgin Publishing	English	0426204026	Written under the collective pseudonym of Martin Adams. Based on the origin established in Stay Sonic.
Sonic the Hedgehog	Sonic the Hedgehog and the Silicon Warriors (Book 3)	James Wallis, Marc Gascoigne and Carl Sargent		Virgin Publishing	English	0426204034	Written under the collective pseudonym of Martin Adams. Based on the origin established in Stay Sonic.
Sonic the Hedgehog	Sonic the Hedgehog in Castle Robotnik (Book 4)	James Wallis, Marc Gascoigne and Carl Sargent		Virgin Publishing	English	0426204050	Written under the collective pseudonym of Martin Adams. Based on the origin established in Stay Sonic.
Sonic the Hedgehog	Sonic the Hedgehog	Michael Teitelbaum		Troll Communications	English	0816731993	
Sonic the Hedgehog	Robotnik's Revenge	Michael Teitelbaum		Troll Communications	English	0816734380	
Sonic the Hedgehog	Fortress of Fear	Michael Teitelbaum		Troll Communications	English	0816735824	
Sonic the Hedgehog	Friend or Foe?	Michael Teitelbaum		Troll Communications	English	0816736723	
Sonic the Hedgehog	Sonic & Knuckles	Michael Teitelbaum		Troll Communications	English	0816737819	
Sonic the Hedgehog	Sonic X-Treme	Michael Teitelbaum		Troll Communications	English	0816743304	
Sonic the Hedgehog	Meteor Shower Messenger	Paul Ruditis		Grosset & Dunlap	English	0448439964	Based on Sonic X.
Sonic the Hedgehog	Spaceship Blue Typhoon	Diana Gallagher		Grosset & Dunlap	English	0448439972	Based on Sonic X.
Marvel's Spider-Man	Spider-Man: Hostile Takeover	David Liss		Titan Books	English	9781785659751	Prequel to Marvel's Spider-Man.
Marvel's Spider-Man	Spider-Man: Miles Morales – Wings of Fury	Brittney Morris		Titan Books	English	9781789094862	Prequel to Marvel's Spider-Man: Miles Morales.
Tom Clancy's Splinter Cell	Tom Clancy's: Splinter Cell	David Michaels		Berkley	English	978-0425201688	
Tom Clancy's Splinter Cell	Tom Clancy's Splinter Cell: Operation Barracuda	David Michaels		Berkley	English	978-0425204221	
Tom Clancy's Splinter Cell	Tom Clancy's Splinter Cell: Checkmate	David Michaels		Berkley	English	978-0425212783	
Tom Clancy's Splinter Cell	Tom Clancy's Splinter Cell: Fallout	David Michaels		Berkley	English	978-0425218242	
Tom Clancy's Splinter Cell	Tom Clancy's Splinter Cell: Conviction	David Michaels		Berkley	English	978-0425231043	
Tom Clancy's Splinter Cell	Tom Clancy's Splinter Cell: Endgame	David Michaels		Berkley	English	978-0425231449	
Tom Clancy's Splinter Cell	Tom Clancy's Splinter Cell: Blacklist Aftermath	Peter Telep		Berkley	English	978-0425266304	
Tom Clancy's Splinter Cell	Tom Clancy's Splinter Cell: Firewall	James Swallow		Aconyte	English	978-1839081149	
Tom Clancy's Splinter Cell	Tom Clancy's Splinter Cell: Dragonfire	James Swallow		Aconyte	English	978-1839082009	
Star Trek: Starfleet Academy – Starship Bridge Simulator	Starfleet Academy	Diane Carey		Pocket Books	English	9780671015503	
Star Trek Online	The Needs of the Many	Michael A. Martin		Pocket Books	English	9781439186572	
Star Wars: Jedi Knight	Dark Forces: Soldier for the Empire	William Dietz		Dark Horse Comics	English	0-399-14198-7	Adapts the prologue mission of the game.
Star Wars: Jedi Knight	Dark Forces: Rebel Agent	William Dietz		Dark Horse Comics	English	0-399-14396-3	Adapts roughly the first half of the game.
Star Wars: Jedi Knight	Dark Forces: Jedi Knight	William Dietz		Dark Horse Comics	English	0-399-14452-8	Adapts the second half of the game.
Star Wars: Galaxies	Star Wars Galaxies: Ruins of Dantooine	Voronica Whitney-Robinson, Haden Blackman		Del Rey	English	0345470664	
Star Wars: Republic Commando	Republic Commando: Hard Contact	Karen Traviss		Del Rey	English	0345478274	
Star Wars: Republic Commando	Republic Commando: Triple Zero	Karen Traviss		Del Rey	English	0345490096	
Star Wars: Republic Commando	Republic Commando: True Colors	Karen Traviss		Del Rey	English	0345498003	
Star Wars: Republic Commando	Republic Commando: Order 66	Karen Traviss		Del Rey	English	0345506189	
Star Wars: Republic Commando	Imperial Commando: 501st	Karen Traviss		Del Rey	English	9780345511133	
Star Wars: The Force Unleashed	Star Wars: The Force Unleashed	Sean Williams		Del Rey	English	978-0345502858	
Star Wars: The Force Unleashed	Star Wars: The Force Unleashed II	Sean Williams		Del Rey	English	978-0345511553	
Star Wars: The Old Republic	The Old Republic: Fatal Alliance	Sean Williams		Del Rey	English	0345511328	
Star Wars: The Old Republic	The Old Republic: Deceived	Paul Kemp		Del Rey	English	978-0-345-51138-6	
Star Wars: The Old Republic	The Old Republic: Revan	Drew Karpyshyn		Del Rey	English	978-0-345-51134-8	
Star Wars: The Old Republic	The Old Republic: Annihilation	Drew Karpyshyn		Del Rey	English	0345529413	
StarCraft	StarCraft: Liberty's Crusade (Book 1)	Jeff Grubb		Simon & Schuster	English	978-0671041489	Based on the original StarCraft game.
StarCraft	StarCraft: Shadow of the Xel'Naga (Book 2)	Gabriel Mesta		Simon & Schuster	English	978-0671041496	Based on the original StarCraft game.
StarCraft	StarCraft: Speed Of Darkness (Book 3)	Tracy Hickman		Simon & Schuster	English	978-0671041502	Based on the original StarCraft game.
StarCraft	StarCraft: Queen Of Blades	Aaron S. Rosenberg		Simon & Schuster	English	978-0743471336	Based on the original StarCraft game.
StarCraft	StarCraft: I, Mengsk	Graham McNeill		Simon & Schuster	English	978-1416550839	Based on the original StarCraft game.
StarCraft	StarCraft: Archive	Jeff Grubb, Gabriel Mesta, Tracy Hickman, Micky Neilson		Simon & Schuster	English	978-1416549291	Gabriel Mesta is a pseudonym of Kevin J. Anderson.
StarCraft	StarCraft: Uprising	Micky Neilson		Simon & Schuster	English	978-0743-41898-0	Prequel to StarCraft.
StarCraft	The Dark Templar: Firstborn (Book 1)	Christie Golden		Simon & Schuster	English	978-0743471251	
StarCraft	The Dark Templar: Shadow Hunters (Book 2)	Christie Golden		Simon & Schuster	English	978-0743471268	
StarCraft	The Dark Templar: Twilight (Book 3)	Christie Golden		Simon & Schuster	English	978-0743471299	
StarCraft	StarCraft: Ghost – Nova	Keith R. A. DeCandido		Simon & Schuster	English	978-0743471343	Based on the cancelled game StarCraft: Ghost.
StarCraft	StarCraft: Ghost – Spectres	Nate Kenyon		Simon & Schuster	English	978-1439109380	Based on the cancelled game StarCraft: Ghost.
StarCraft	StarCraft II: Heaven's Devils	William C. Dietz		Simon & Schuster	English	978-1416550846	Based on StarCraft II: Wings of Liberty.
StarCraft	StarCraft II: Devils' Due	Christie Golden		Simon & Schuster	English	978-1416550853	Based on StarCraft II: Wings of Liberty.
StarCraft	StarCraft II: Flashpoint	Christie Golden		Simon & Schuster	English	978-0743471312	Based on StarCraft II: Wings of Liberty.
StarCraft	StarCraft Evolution	Timothy Zahn		Del Rey	English	978-0425284735	
Starship Titanic	Douglas Adams's Starship Titanic: A Novel	Terry Jones		Ballantine Books	English	978-0-609601037	Novelization of the game.
Stationfall	Stationfall	Arthur Byron Cover	1989	Avon Books	English	978-0380753871	
Street Fighter	Street Fighter: Dream Never Ends	Talyn Rahman-Figueroa		Smashwords	English	9781301816958	Available online. Plans for the book to be published in partnership with Capcom.
Street Fighter	Street Fighter II / Streets of Rage II: The Novels	Chris Rice		Impact Magazines (UK) Ltd	English	1874660069	Combined novelizations of Street Fighter II and Streets of Rage II. Part of Sega's Sega Force novel series.
Streets of Rage	Street Fighter II / Streets of Rage II: The Novels	Mat Yeo		Impact Magazines (UK) Ltd	English	1874660069	Combined novelizations of Street Fighter II and Streets of Rage II. Part of Sega's Sega Force novel series.
Super Mario Bros.	Mario and the Incredible Rescue	Tracey West		Scholastic	English	0439843669	Part of Nintendo's Nintendo Heroes series.
Super Monaco GP	Super Monaco GP	Neil West		Future	English	1872666167	Part of Sega's Sega Power novel series.
Super Smash TV	Super Smash TV	Mat Yeo		Impact	English	1874660034	Part of Sega's Sega Force novel series.

== T ==
Based on	Title	Author(s)	Pub. date	Publisher	Original language	ISBN	Notes
Tekken	The Dark History of Mishima	Takashi Yano		Shueisha	Japanese	978-4087754025	
Temple Run	Jungle Trek	Chase Wilder		Egmont USA	English	9781606845714	Choose Your Own Adventure-style books based on the game.
Temple Run	Doom Lagoon	Chase Wilder		Egmont USA	English	9781606845721	Choose Your Own Adventure-style books based on the game.
Temple Run	Arctic Rescue	Chase Wilder		Egmont USA	English	9781606845905	Choose Your Own Adventure-style books based on the game.
Temple Run	Pyramid Peril	Chase Wilder		Egmont USA	English	9781606845943	Choose Your Own Adventure-style books based on the game.
Temple Run	Castle Chase	Chase Wilder		Egmont USA	English	9781405276337	Choose Your Own Adventure-style books based on the game.
Temple Run	Volcanic Island	Chase Wilder		Egmont USA	English	9781405276344	Choose Your Own Adventure-style books based on the game.
Tex Murphy	Tex Murphy: Under a Killing Moon	Aaron Conners		Independently published	English	978-1500340650	Novelization of the game of the same name.
Tex Murphy	Tex Murphy: The Pandora Directive	Aaron Conners		Independently published	English	978-1499706420	Novelization of the game of the same name.
Tex Murphy	Tex Murphy: The Tesla Effect	Aaron Conners		Independently published	English	978-1499614886	Novelization of the game of the same name.
Tex Murphy	Tex Murphy: The Poisoned Pawn	Aaron Conners		Independently published	English	979-8598878071	Novelization of the cancelled game of the same name; incorporates elements of the game Tex Murphy: Overseer, itself largely a retelling of the first game, Mean Streets.
Thunderscape	The Sentinel	Dixie Lee McKeone		Harpercollins	English	9780061054600	
Thunderscape	Darkfall	Shane Lacy Hensley		Harpercollins	English	9780061054594	
Thunderscape	Indominatable Thunder	Mark Aces		Harpercollins	English	9780061054587	
Tomb Raider	Tomb Raider: The Amulet of Power	Mike Resnick		Del Rey	English	978-0345461711	
Tomb Raider	Tomb Raider: The Lost Cult	E. E. Knight		Del Rey	English	978-0345461728	
Tomb Raider	Tomb Raider: The Man of Bronze	James Alan Gardner		Del Rey	English	978-0345461735	
Tomb Raider	Tomb Raider: The Ten Thousand Immortals	Dan Abnett, Nik Vincent		DK	English	978-1465415479	Set after the 2013 reboot but before the Dark Horse comic series.
Tomb Raider	Lara Croft and the Blade of Gwynnever	Dan Abnett, Nik Vincent		BradyGames	English	978-1465441416	
Tomb Raider	Shadow of the Tomb Raider: Path to Apocalypse	S. D. Perry		Titan Books	English	978-1785659911	Set during Shadow of the Tomb Raider, between the Mexico and Peru sections.
Total War	Total War Rome: Destroy Carthage	David Gibbins		Thomas Dunne Books	English	978-1250038647	
Total War	The Sword of Attila	David Gibbins		Thomas Dunne Books	English	978-1466834255	
Turok: Dinosaur Hunter	Turok: Way of the Warrior	Michael Teitelbaum		Golden Books	English	030716280X	Prequel to the game series.
Turok: Dinosaur Hunter	Turok: Seeds of Evil / Seeds of Doom	Michael Teitelbaum		Golden Books	English	0307162818	Rough novelization of Turok 2: Seeds of Evil.
Turok: Dinosaur Hunter	Turok: Arena of Doom	Michael Teitelbaum		Golden Books	English	0307162826	Rough novelization of Turok: Dinosaur Hunter.
Turok: Dinosaur Hunter	Turok: Path of Destruction	Michael Teitelbaum		Golden Books	English	0307162834	

== U ==
Based on	Title	Author(s)	Pub. date	Publisher	Original language	ISBN	Notes
Ultima	Ultima: Monstrous Metamorphosis Vol. 1: Book of the Water Dragon	Aya Nishitani	January 25, 1988	Kadokawa	Japanese	978-4044104160	
Ultima	Ultima: Monstrous Metamorphosis Vol. 2: Book of Magic	Aya Nishitani	June 1, 1989	Kadokawa	Japanese	978-4044104177	
Ultima	Ultima: Monstrous Metamorphosis Vol. 3: Book of the Crimson Fog	Aya Nishitani	August 1, 1990	Kadokawa	Japanese	978-4044104184	
Ultima	Ultima Novel: Quest of the Avatar	Naomi Inoue	October 30, 1989	JICC	Japanese	978-4880636054	
Ultima	Ultima Gaiden: Lovers of Cyber Tower	Various	January 25, 1991	Kadokawa	Japanese	978-4047824010	Short story collection.
Ultima	Ultima Saga: The Forge of Virtue	Lynn Abbey	1991	Questar Fantasy	English	978-0445210653	
Ultima	Ultima Saga: The Temper of Wisdom	Lynn Abbey	1992	Questar Fantasy	English	978-0446362269	
Ultima	Ultima VI: Survive and Fight!	Tetsuo Kanai	March 15, 1993	Locus	Japanese	978-4795276284	
Ultima	Ultima Underworld	Ippei Noma, Kenji Fushimi	July 22, 1994	Aspect	Japanese	978-4893661784	
Ultima	Ultima Underworld 1.5: Bride of Another Dimension	Tetsuo Kanai	August 10, 1994	Locus	Japanese	978-4795276338	
Ultima	Ultima: The Technocrat War Book I of III: Machinations	Austen Andrews	2001	Electronic Arts	English	0743403797	
Ultima	Ultima: The Technocrat War Book II of III: Masquerade	Austen Andrews	2002	Electronic Arts	English	978-0743403801	
Ultima	Ultima: The Technocrat War Book III of III: Maelstrom	Austen Andrews	2002	Electronic Arts	English	978-0743423229	
Uncharted	Uncharted: The Fourth Labyrinth	Christopher Golden		DelRey	English	978-0345522177	
Unreal	Hard Crash (Book 1)	Ryan Hughes		Pocket Books	English	978-0671018818	Ryan Hughes is a pseudonym of Jerry Oltion.
Unreal	Prophet's Power (Book 2)	Dean Wesley Smith		Pocket Books	English	978-0671018825	

== V ==
Based on	Title	Author(s)	Pub. date	Publisher	Original language	ISBN	Notes

== W ==
Based on	Title	Author(s)	Pub. date	Publisher	Original language	ISBN	Notes
WarCraft	Warcraft: Day of the Dragon (Book 1)	Richard A. Knaak		Pocket Books	English	978-0671041526	
WarCraft	Warcraft: Lord of the Clans (Book 2)	Christie Golden		Pocket Books	English	978-0743426909	
WarCraft	Warcraft: The Last Guardian (Book 3)	Jeff Grubb		Pocket Books	English	978-0671041519	
WarCraft	Warcraft: Of Blood and Honor	Chris Metzen		Pocket Books	English	0743418972	
WarCraft	Warcraft: War of the Ancients: The Well of Eternity (Book 1)	Richard A. Knaak		Pocket Star	English	978-0743471190	
WarCraft	Warcraft: War of the Ancients: The Demon Soul (Book 2)	Richard A. Knaak		Pocket Star	English	978-0743471206	
WarCraft	Warcraft: War of the Ancients: The Sundering (Book 3)	Richard A. Knaak		Pocket Star	English	978-0743471213	
WarCraft	Warcraft: War of the Ancients Archive	Richard A. Knaak		Gallery Books	English	9781416552031	War of the Ancients trilogy compilation.
WarCraft	Warcraft Archive	Richard A. Knaak, Christie Golden, Jeff Grubb, Chris Metzen		Gallery Books	English	9781416525820	Compilation of the first four Warcraft books.
WarCraft	Warcraft: Durotan	Christie Golden		Titan Books	English	9781783299607	Prequel to the Warcraft film.
Warhammer 40,000: Dawn of War	Dawn of War	C. S. Goto		Games Workshop	English	978-1844165445	
Warhammer 40,000: Dawn of War	Dawn of War: Ascension	C. S. Goto		Games Workshop	English	978-1844162857	
Warhammer 40,000: Dawn of War	Dawn of War: Tempest	C. S. Goto		Games Workshop	English	9781844163991	
Warhammer 40,000: Dawn of War	Blood Ravens: The Dawn of War Omnibus	C. S. Goto		Games Workshop	English	978-1844165353	
Warhammer 40,000: Fire Warrior	Fire Warrior	Simon Spurrier		Games Workshop	English	978-1844160105	
Watch Dogs	Watch Dogs //n/Dark Clouds	John Shirley	May 27, 2014	Ubisoft	English	ASIN B00JS59ZK4	Sequel to Watch Dogs. Available only in E-Book format.
Watch Dogs	Watch Dogs: Legion – Day Zero	James Swallow, Josh Reynolds	October 13, 2020	Aconyte	English	978-1839080487	Prequel to Watch Dogs: Legion.
Watch Dogs	Watch Dogs: Legion – Stars & Stripes	Stewart Hotston	March 1, 2022	Aconyte	English	978-1839081262	Prequel to Watch Dogs: Legion – Bloodline.
Watch Dogs	Watch Dogs: Legion – Daybreak Legacy	Stewart Hotston	June 7, 2022	Aconyte	English	978-1839081385	Sequel to Watch Dogs: Legion.
Watch Dogs	Watch Dogs: Legion – Cold Reboot	Robbie MacNiven	August 16, 2023	Aconyte	English	978-1839082238	
Wing Commander	Freedom Flight	Mercedes Lackey, Ellen Guon		Baen Books	English	9780671721459	
Wing Commander	End Run	Christopher Stasheff, William R. Forstchen		Baen Books	English	9780671722005	
Wing Commander	Fleet Action	William R. Forstchen		Baen Books	English	9780671722111	
Wing Commander	Heart of the Tiger	William R. Forstchen, Andrew Keith		Baen Books	English	9780671876531	Novelization of Wing Commander III: Heart of the Tiger.
Wing Commander	The Price of Freedom	William R. Forstchen, Ben Ohlander		Baen Books	English	9780671877514	Novelization of Wing Commander IV: The Price of Freedom.
Wing Commander	Action Stations	William R. Forstchen		Baen Books	English	9780671878597	Prequel to the Wing Commander series.
Wing Commander	False Colors	William R. Forstchen, Andrew Keith		Baen Books	English	9780671577841	
Wishbringer	Wishbringer	Craig Shaw Gardner	1988	Avon Books	English	978-0380753857	Novelization of the game.
Wizards & Warriors	Worlds of Power: Wizards & Warriors	Ellen Miles	1990	Scholastic	English	0590437690	
World of Warcraft	World of Warcraft: Cycle of Hatred	Keith R.A. DeCandido		Pocket Star	English	978-0743471367	
World of Warcraft	World of Warcraft: Night of the Dragon	Richard A. Knaak		Pocket Star	English	978-0743471374	
World of Warcraft	World of Warcraft: Arthas: Rise of the Lich King	Christie Golden		Pocket Star	English	978-1439157602	
World of Warcraft	World of Warcraft: Stormrage	Richard A. Knaak		Pocket Star	English	978-1439189467	
World of Warcraft	World of Warcraft: The Shattering: Prelude to Cataclysm	Christie Golden		Pocket Star	English	1416550747	
World of Warcraft	World of Warcraft: Thrall: Twilight of the Aspects	Christie Golden		Pocket Star	English	1416550887	
World of Warcraft	World of Warcraft: Vol'jin: Shadows of the Horde	Michael A. Stackpole		Pocket Star	English	9781416550679	
World of Warcraft	World of Warcraft: War Crimes	Christie Golden		Pocket Star	English	9781451684483	
World of Warcraft	World of Warcraft: Wolfheart	Richard A. Knaak		Pocket Star	English	978-1451605761	
World of Warcraft	World of Warcraft: Jaina Proudmoore: Tides of War	Christie Golden		Pocket Star	English	978-1451697919	
World of Warcraft	World of Warcraft: Rise of the Horde	Christie Golden		Pocket Star	English	978-0743471381	
World of Warcraft	World of Warcraft: Tides of Darkness	Aaron Rosenberg		Pocket Star	English	978-1416539902	
World of Warcraft	World of Warcraft: Beyond the Dark Portal	Aaron Rosenberg, Christie Golden		Pocket Star	English	978-1416550860	
World of Warcraft	World of Warcraft: Destination Pandaria	Elias Vandoren		Amazon	English	ASIN B00KUS75O6	
World of Warcraft	World of Warcraft: Illidan	William King		Titan Publishing	English	978-0399177569	
World of Warcraft	World of Warcraft: Before the Storm	Christie Golden		Titan Publishing	English	9780399594090	
World of Warcraft	World of Warcraft: Dawn of the Aspects: Part I	Richard A. Knaak		Gallery Books	English	9781416550693	
World of Warcraft	World of Warcraft: Dawn of the Aspects: Part II	Richard A. Knaak		Gallery Books	English	9781476708614	
World of Warcraft	World of Warcraft: Dawn of the Aspects: Part III	Richard A. Knaak		Gallery Books	English	9781476708621	
World of Warcraft	World of Warcraft: Dawn of the Aspects: Part IV	Richard A. Knaak		Gallery Books	English	9781476708638	
World of Warcraft	World of Warcraft: Dawn of the Aspects: Part V	Richard A. Knaak		Gallery Books	English	9781476708645	
World of Warcraft	World of Warcraft: Dawn of the Aspects	Richard A. Knaak		Gallery Books	English	9781476761374	Dawn of the Aspects series compilation.
World of Warcraft	World of Warcraft: Paragons	Micky Neilson, Sarah Pine, James Waugh, Gavin Jurgens-Fyhrie, Matt Burns, Brian Kindregan, Cameron Dayton, Steven Nix, Valerie Watrous, Dave Kosak, E. Daniel Arey, Marc Hutcheson, Evelyn Fredericksen		Pocket Star	English	ASIN B00H5SDPJS	Short story compilation.
World of Warcraft	World of Warcraft: Traveler	Greg Weisman		Scholastic	English	978-0545906678	The Traveller series is a spin-off of the World of Warcraft novels, aimed at a pre-teen audience.
World of Warcraft	Traveler: The Spiral Path	Greg Weisman		Scholastic	English	978-1338029376	The Traveller series is a spin-off of the World of Warcraft novels, aimed at a pre-teen audience.
World of Warcraft	Traveler: The Shining Blade	Madeleine Roux		Scholastic	English	978-1338538946	The Traveller series is a spin-off of the World of Warcraft novels, aimed at a pre-teen audience.

== X ==
Based on	Title	Author(s)	Pub. date	Publisher	Original language	ISBN	Notes
X	Farnham's Legend	Helge T. Kautz		EGOSOFT GmbH	German	ASIN B01C4G8702	
X	Nopileos	Helge T. Kautz		EGOSOFT GmbH	German	ASIN B07N7RRJG8	
X	X3: Yoshiko	Helge T. Kautz		EGOSOFT GmbH	German	ASIN B07YTVG3WZ	
X-COM	X-COM: UFO Defense	Diane Duane		Prima Lifestyles	English	0761502351	
Xevious	Xevious: Fardraut	Masanobu Endō	1991	Futabasha	Japanese	978-4835441856	

== Y ==
Based on	Title	Author(s)	Pub. date	Publisher	Original language	ISBN	Notes

== Z ==
Based on	Title	Author(s)	Pub. date	Publisher	Original language	ISBN	Notes
