= The Born Queen =

Novel by J. Gregory Keyes

- Author: Greg Keyes
- Cover artist: Stephen Youll
- Language: English
- Series: The Kingdoms of Thorn and Bone
- Genre: Fantasy novel
- Publisher: Del Rey Books
- Publication date: April 2008
- Publication place: United States
- Media type: Print (hardback)
- Pages: 448 pp
- ISBN: 978-0-345-44069-3
- OCLC: 154759780
- Dewey Decimal: 813/.54 22
- LC Class: PS3561.E79 B67 2008
- Preceded by: The Blood Knight

The Born Queen is a fantasy novel by Greg Keyes. It is the fourth and final novel in the series The Kingdoms of Thorn and Bone.

== Plot summary ==
In this final novel of the series, Anne Dare, finally on the throne of Crotheny, goes to war with both the Church and the powerful northern nation of Hansa. Her eldritch powers continue to grow and threaten to overwhelm her. The monk Stephen Darige, now aligned with the Blood Knight, attempts to fulfill his role in an ancient prophecy, while the Holter Aspar White continues to battle abominations and save his forest, while trying to understand the mysteries surrounding him. Meanwhile the dessrator Cazio is rescued by and reunited with his mentor, the swordmaster z'Accato. Queen Muriele and the now badly injured Sir Neil MeqVren are sent by Anne to Hansa on a mission of peace, while they covertly look for a way to defeat them.
