= Lord of Souls =

2011 novel by Gregory Keyes

- Author: Greg Keyes
- Illustrator: Paul Youll
- Language: English
- Series: The Elder Scrolls
- Genre: Fantasy
- Publisher: Del Rey (US); Titan Books (UK)
- Publication date: September 27, 2011
- Media type: Print (Paperback), Ebook
- Pages: 346 pp
- ISBN: 978-0-345-50802-7
- Preceded by: The Infernal City

Lord of Souls is a fantasy novel by Greg Keyes. It is the second of two books based on The Elder Scrolls series of video games. It was published on September 27, 2011, by Titan Books in the UK, and by Del Rey Books in the US.

== Plot ==
Like its predecessor The Infernal City, the novel Lord of Souls takes places about 40 years after the events of The Elder Scrolls IV: Oblivion and The Elder Scrolls IV: Shivering Isles, and some 160 years prior to the events of The Elder Scrolls V: Skyrim.

Prince Attrebus carries on with his quest to obtain a magical sword Umbra, which will be able to destroy the invaders from Umbriel. In the Imperial City however, the Penitus Oculatus Agent Colin finds evidence of betrayal in the heart of the Mede Empire. Sul and Attrebus, captured by Malacath, escape and resume the search for Umbra, and are led to a fort where the current wielder of Umbra has been buried alive after the sword drove him immediately insane.

Annaig is again promoted after introducing new ideas and dishes into Umbriel's court, and eventually tricks a rival kitchen into confirmation that she had recreated their secret ingredient, also condemning Slyr, her assistant, to death after Slyr repeatedly tries to poison and murder her. Her mood further darkens after Mere-Glim is caught and killed while attempting to lead the skraws in another raid. Annaig is then forced to become a slave of dark lord of Umbriel, who has an insatiable hunger for souls.

== Reception ==
Starburst wrote: "Fans of the first book will probably enjoy it, and fans of the game will enjoy the references, but for anyone else I’d advise that you leave this book well alone, or at least try the first in the series before splashing out on this one." Joker said that although the book is better than The Infernal City, the characters and plot still remain too superficial.

== See also ==
- List of novels based on video games

== Sources ==
- Lord of Souls at Amazon.com
- Lord of Souls at Random House
