= Game Design Expo =

Recurring event in Vancouver

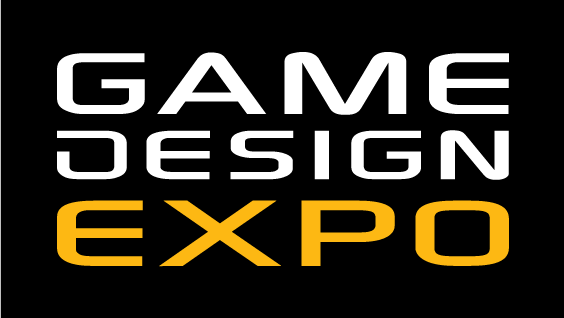
- The Game Design Expo logo
- Status: Active
- Location: Vancouver
- Country: Canada
- Inaugurated: 2007
- Organizer: Vancouver Film School
- Website: http://www.gamedesignexpo.com

Game Design Expo is an annual event in Vancouver, British Columbia, Canada, for video game industry professionals and enthusiasts, hosted by Vancouver Film School's Game Design program. The inaugural event in 2007 was the first of its kind in Vancouver. Game Design Expo has presented such industry speakers as Ron Gilbert and Eric Zimmerman, and designers and producers from companies like Bungie, Activision, Electronic Arts, BioWare, and Mythic Entertainment.

== History ==
Tickets to Game Design Expo 2007 sold out, and the event has occurred annually since then. It takes place at Vancity Theatre at the Vancouver International Film Centre and at Vancouver Film School's Game Design campus.

== Notable speakers ==
- Don Daglow
- Ellen Beeman
- Ron Gilbert
- Eric Zimmerman

Jay Weinland and CJ Cowan, two of the team leads behind Bungie Studios' blockbuster Halo 3.

Clint Hocking, creative director at Ubisoft Montreal, was the keynote speaker and a draw for Game Design Expo 2009.

In 2010, William Ho of ModNation Racers spoke to Game Design Expo audience members about video games and user-generated content. Level Director Josh Bridge and Creative Director Jason Leigh also walked the audience through their process in bringing Dead Rising 2 from concept to console.

The 2011 Game Design Expo included speakers from the makers of Angry Birds and Cory Stockton from Blizzard Entertainment speaking about World of Warcraft

== Highlights ==
At the 2009 event, Vancouver Film School offered a new scholarship to encourage women to consider a career in the video game industry. The $30,000 Women in Games scholarship was awarded to a female student entering Vancouver Film School's one-year Game Design program.

In 2010 Vancouver Film School announced that they would be presenting a $30,000 Women in Games Scholarship for the second straight year.

In 2011 Vancouver Film School announced a Women in Games Scholarship for a third time. The 2011 scholarship was increased to a value of $50,000.
