= The Kingdoms of Thorn and Bone =

Novel series

- The Briar King; The Charnel Prince; The Blood Knight; The Born Queen
- Author: Greg Keyes
- Country: United States
- Language: English
- Genre: Fantasy, thriller.
- Publisher: Del Rey Books
- Published: January 2003-April 2008
- Media type: Print (hardcover and paperback); Audiobook

The Kingdoms of Thorn and Bone is the name of a fantasy novel series by Gregory Keyes, written between 2003 and 2008. They follow the story of Anne Dare, descendant of Virginia Dare, a famed ruler who used her magic to aid the kingdom of Crotheny. Her descendants rule the kingdom until a traitorous plot to overthrow them leads to tragedy.

The books generally follow the overall fate of its several protagonists and the lands from which they hail. The events recounted deal mainly with the destiny of the kingdom of Crotheny. However, several strands of plotlines sometimes lead to one another while also expanding the history, characters and events of the series. The series leans more on its character development to develop the plot from several different perspectives, but is also peppered with legends, myths, detailed world backstory, kingdoms, wars and monsters that characterize the genre.

The Kingdoms of Thorn and Bone is a series of four novels written by Gregory Keyes:

- The Briar King (2003), ISBN 1-4050-3351-7
- The Charnel Prince (2004), ISBN 0-345-44067-6
- The Blood Knight (2006), ISBN 1-4050-3355-X
- The Born Queen (2008), ISBN 978-0-345-44069-3
