= World of Warcraft: Tides of Darkness =

2007 novel by Aaron S. Rosenberg

Tides of Darkness
- First edition cover
- Author: Aaron S. Rosenberg
- Cover artist: Glenn Rane
- Language: English
- Series: Warcraft
- Genre: Fantasy
- Published: 2007 (Pocket Books)
- Publication place: United States
- Media type: Print (paperback)
- Pages: 384 pp
- ISBN: 1-4165-3990-5
- OCLC: 148741082
- LC Class: CPB Box no. 2691 vol. 9

World of Warcraft: Tides of Darkness is a fantasy novel written by Aaron S. Rosenberg and published by Simon & Schuster's Pocket Star Books, a division of Viacom. The novel is based on Blizzard Entertainment's Warcraft universe, and is a novelization of the RTS PC game: Warcraft II: Tides of Darkness (1995). It was made available on August 28, 2007 .

== Plot ==
The novel explores the events of the Second War (which took place during Warcraft II) when the Orcish Horde, led by Warchief Orgrim Doomhammer, returns to Azeroth to destroy the Human nations. The book writer Aaron S. Rosenberg commented at a public Q&A that among the main characters are Khadgar, Turalyon, Lothar, the sisters Windrunner (Alleria, Sylvanas and Vereesa), Orgrim Doomhammer, Zul'jin and Gul'dan.

Places featured are Hillsbrad, Stromgarde, Blackrock Spire, Caer Darrow, Stratholme and Quel'Thalas among others.

== Association ==
Warcraft II: Tides of Darkness is the sequel to the popular real-time strategy game Warcraft: Orcs & Humans, developed by Blizzard Entertainment and released in December 1995.

== Reception ==
A 2008 review of the novel in New Straits Times said: "It is not in the league of Tolkien, lacking the same breadth, depth or poetic quality, but is competently written and an entertaining read for lovers of fantasy tales."

== See also ==
- Warcraft II: Beyond the Dark Portal
- Warcraft: Orcs & Humans
- Warcraft III: Reign of Chaos
- World of Warcraft
- List of novels based on video games
