= The Age of Unreason =

Novel series

The Age of Unreason is a series of four novels in the historical fantasy genre written by Gregory Keyes:

- Newton's Cannon (1998), ISBN 1-56865-829-X
- A Calculus of Angels (1999), ISBN 0-7394-0260-9
- Empire of Unreason (2000), ISBN 0-345-40609-5
- The Shadows of God (2001), ISBN 0-345-43904-X

Its title is a reference to Thomas Paine's treatise The Age of Reason (1794-1807). The story spans the late 17th and early 18th centuries, with the action moving between England and France, later involving Russia, Austria, the Republic of Venice, and North America. The author makes use of pseudosciences (scientific alchemy instead of our physics) that were popular at the time: using affinity and aether, for example. Some historical characters appear in important roles: Isaac Newton, Voltaire, Benjamin Franklin, Cotton Mather, King Louis XIV of France, Emperor Peter the Great of Russia, King Charles XII of Sweden, and Edward "Blackbeard" Teach.
