= Newton's Cannon =

1998 novel by Gregory Keyes

- First edition cover.
- Author: Gregory Keyes
- Language: English
- Series: The Age of Unreason
- Genre: Alternate history, fantasy
- Publisher: Del Rey/Ballantine
- Publication date: May 1998
- Publication place: United States
- Media type: Print (Paperback)
- Pages: 355
- Followed by: A Calculus of Angels

Newton's Cannon (1998) is a science fantasy novel by American writer Gregory Keyes, the first book in his The Age of Unreason series. The protagonist for the novel is Benjamin Franklin; other key characters to the novel are James Franklin – Ben's brother, John Collins – Ben's friend, as well as Adrienne and King Louis XIV – the Sun King.

== The Age of Unreason Series ==
The other three novels of the series are:

- A Calculus of Angels
- Empire of Unreason
- The Shadow of Gods

== See also ==
- Space gun
