= A Calculus of Angels =

1999 novel by Gregory Keyes

- Author: Gregory Keyes
- Cover artist: Therese Nielsen
- Language: English
- Series: The Age of Unreason
- Genre: Alternate history, fantasy
- Publisher: Del Rey
- Publication date: March 30, 1999
- Publication place: United States
- Media type: Print (Paperback)
- Pages: 406
- ISBN: 978-0-345-40607-1
- OCLC: 39695456
- Dewey Decimal: 813/.54 21
- LC Class: PS3561.E79 C35 1999
- Preceded by: Newton's Cannon
- Followed by: Empire of Unreason

A Calculus of Angels is an alternate history and fantasy novel by American writer Gregory Keyes, the second book in The Age of Unreason series. It was initially published by Del Rey on March 30, 1999. A follow-up to Newton's Cannon, the book is set in 1722 and continues the alternate history where Isaac Newton discovers that alchemy works, and a powerful science is built upon it.

== Sources ==
- "A Calculus of Angels (Book)." Publishers Weekly 246.12 (22 March 1999): 74.
- Green, Roland. "Adult books: Fiction." Booklist 95.16 (15 April 1999): 1518.
- Cassada, Jackie, and Barbara Hoffert. "Book Reviews: Fiction." Library Journal 124.7 (15 April 1999): 148.
- Vretos, Linda A., and Trevelyn E. Jones. "Adult/Young Adult: Fiction." School Library Journal 46.1 (January 2000): 156.
