= The Infernal City =

2009 fantasy novel by Greg Keyes

- Author: Greg Keyes
- Illustrator: Paul Youll
- Language: English
- Series: The Elder Scrolls
- Genre: Fantasy
- Publisher: Del Rey (US); Titan Books (UK)
- Publication date: November 24, 2009
- Media type: Print (Paperback), Ebook
- Pages: 288 pp
- ISBN: 978-0-345-50801-0
- Followed by: Lord of Souls

The Infernal City is a fantasy novel by Greg Keyes. It is the first of two published books based on The Elder Scrolls series of video games. It was published on November 24, 2009, by Titan Books in the UK, and Del Rey Books in the US.

== Plot ==
Set 40 years after the events of The Elder Scrolls IV: Oblivion, the story begins as an unknown mass appears on the coast of Black Marsh during a powerful storm, an event witnessed in a nightmare by a Dunmer assassin named Sul.

Annaïg Hoïnart and Mere-Glim are living in Black Marsh when the mass arrives, now identified as the flying city of Umbriel. Once the city arrives, the two fly up to it, through the effects of a magic potion. While at the city, they witness everyone on the land below them dying due to Umbriel. The two are quickly captured, separated, and forced to work by the native of Umbriel, but before that Annaïg is able to send Coo, an enchanted bird that allows her to communicate over long distances, to Attrebus Mede, prince of the Tamrielic Empire.

Attrebus receives Annaïg's bird, and asks his father, the Emperor Titus Mede I, to send an expedition to stop the flying city. When his request is refused, Attrebus gathers his personal guard and attacks the city himself. Soon after embarking on his mission, he is betrayed by one of the newest members of his guard. His entire guard is slain, and Attrebus himself is captured.

Meanwhile, Annaïg has been forced to become a cook on Umbriel, creating food for the lords of the flying island. The work is hard, but due to her experience of the outside world, as well as her knowledge of alchemy, she is able to become quite successful.

Following Attrebus's betrayal, Colin, a young inspector for the Penitus Oculatus, inspects the area where Attrebus was attacked. He discovers a decapitated and charred body with Attrebus' Imperial signet ring, but believes it is too convenient to be authentic. Meanwhile, Attrebus is rescued by the mysterious Sul. The two decide to work together to try to stop Umbriel's advance.

Due to Annaïg's growing prestige, a rival kitchen raids her kitchen in an attempt to capture her. Everyone but Annaïg and her assistant Slyr are killed. During the attack, Annaïg loses the locket that connects her to Coo, but accidentally acquires her kitchen master's invisible blade, which wraps itself around her forearm. She later discovers that it only opens when she truly desires to kill someone. Meanwhile, Glim finds a section of Umbriel with exposed sky and begins plotting an escape. He also enlists the aid of a woman he meets to allow him to pass information between himself and Annaïg.

Sul and Attrebus, accompanied by a group of Khajiit, travel to Water's Edge for supplies, and while there Attrebus tries to garner support from an old friend, Captain Florius Larsus. Florius agrees to join Attrebus, but while waiting for him in a tavern Attrebus is attacked yet again. He finds that one of the men that attacked him worked for Florius, but when Attrebus returns to Florius he finds him with a knife wound in the base of his skull.

Sul, Attrebus, and the Khajiit press on. Unable to catch up to Umbriel by traveling on foot, they travel through the Planes of Oblivion using a shortcut that Sul had discovered previously. They are mostly successful, but are intercepted in the realm of the Daedric prince Hircine. The Khajiit sacrifice themselves so Sul and Attrebus can escape.

Meanwhile, Annaïg and Glim plot their escape. The two finally regroup and drink potions of flight. However, when floating away from Umbriel, the two begin to fade, losing their corporeality. They are forced to return to Umbriel, realizing they are stuck on Umbriel like the rest of its inhabitants.

Colin has traced the source of the betrayal to an agent in the Imperial Palace, and follows her to a meeting with a crime lord. The agent says she is disappointed the job was not completed, and transforms into a monstrous beast, killing the crime lord and all his bodyguards. Colin is unable to discover who the agent is working for, but is able to escape with his life.

Sul and Attrebus are abducted by the Lord of Umbriel, Vuhon, who is also revealed to be the one who had orchestrated Attrebus's earlier betrayal. Trapped in his personal chambers, Vuhon offers Attrebus a choice to save his people by giving Vuhon what he wants, but in so doing reveals that they are actually in a Plane of Oblivion. Before any bargain is struck, Sul uses his connection to Oblivion to summon a Daedra, which allows Sul and Attrebus to escape.

The book ends on a cliffhanger, with Glim and Annaïg back on Umbriel, defeated. They spend a few hours together before saying their goodbyes, and Annaïg promises Glim that, while all they can do is continue to move forward, eventually they will be free.

== Characters ==
Main characters:

Titus Mede I - Emperor of Tamriel. Upon ascending to the throne in 4E17, he established a spy order called the 'Penitus Oculatus' to replace the Blades.

Prince Attrebus Mede - Prince of the Empire and son of Titus Mede. After being contacted by Annaïg via her magical talisman Coo, Attrebus sets out to rescue her from Umbriel, until being captured by mercenaries. Attrebus has been coddled his whole life, and has inflated opinions of his abilities and standings, learning his "friends" loathe him, and his combat training was carefully orchestrated babysitting.

Annaïg Hoïnart - A young Breton girl who accidentally arrives on Umbriel with her friend Mere-Glim, and the two of them are captured.

Colin Vineben - An Anvil-born Inspector in the Penitus Oculatus who investigates the disappearance of Attrebus and later Umbriel's appearance in Tamriel.

Mere-Glim - An Argonian and the best friend of Annaïg Hoïnart. They accidentally arrive on Umbriel and are captured.

Sul - A Dunmer man who travels with Attrebus to Umbriel. He was thrown into Oblivion along with Vuhon when Red Mountain erupted.

Mazgar gra Yagash - An Orc and one of a group of Imperial Legion scouts sent to investigate the stories about Umbriel, assigned as bodyguard to the mage Brennus.

== Reception ==
Game Industry News wrote that Keyes "[...] manages to capture the grandeur and complexity of The Elder Scrolls universe while weaving a new and fascinating story." Joker said the book lacks passion for the source material.

== See also ==
- List of novels based on video games
