= North Side Inc =

North Side is a software company based in Montreal. It was founded in 2000, and over the years, the company has been developing natural language understanding and natural language generation (together, dialogue) software since 2001.

== History ==
The company was founded by Eugene Joseph in 2000, after his first company, Virtual Prototypes Inc., went public on the Toronto Stock Exchange in July 1999; that company currently operates as Presagis, a subsidiary of CAE. In the early 2000s, North Side did R&D work funded in part by the Canadian Department of National Defence and National Research Council and Telefilm Canada. In 2007, North Side embarked on the development of Bot Colony, the first video game making coherent English dialogue with the characters an integral part of gameplay. At its peak, in 2014, this team had 45 members. The game development was financed in part by the Canada Media Fund and the first two episodes of Bot Colony were launched on Steam on June 17, 2014. The company claimed to have spent approximately $23 million on the project by its shutdown in 2015, of which around $20 million went towards R&D in natural language understanding.

== Current activities ==
The company launched VerbalAccess at Finovate in New York City on September 16, 2015. VerbalAccess provides an English interface to financial services in English. VerbalAccess is intended to allow people to send transactions through speech, or via text-messages. The knowledge base of VerbalAccess spans financial services encompassing banking, credit cards, creditworthiness and loans, savings, and to a more limited extent, insurance and investments.

== Technology ==
For Bot Colony, North Side added a semantic reasoner to the natural language understanding pipeline, which is able to reason on logical axioms expressed in English (the equivalent of Prolog with predicates in English) and on formalized procedural knowledge expressed in English. A key feature distinguishing North Side's technology from an intelligent personal assistant based on machine learning, such as Apple's Siri or Google's Now, is its ability to clarify ambiguous or incomplete input and handle paraphrases, using a deterministic, rule-based approach. North Side relies on advances in parsing and disambiguation to understand language more precisely, making financial transactions through voice or text-messaging feasible. The underlying database technology supporting North Side's NLU technology is the Versant Object Database from Actian.
