= The Blood Knight =

2006 novel by Greg Keyes

- Author: Greg Keyes
- Cover artist: Stephen Youll
- Language: English
- Series: The Kingdoms of Thorn and Bone
- Genre: Fantasy
- Publisher: Del Rey Books
- Publication date: 2006
- Publication place: United States
- Media type: Print (hardback & paperback)
- Pages: 495 pp
- ISBN: 0-345-44068-4
- OCLC: 64065957
- Dewey Decimal: 813/.54 22
- LC Class: PS3561.E79 B58 2006
- Preceded by: The Charnel Prince
- Followed by: The Born Queen

The Blood Knight is a fantasy novel by Greg Keyes. It's a sequel to The Charnel Prince and the third book of The Kingdoms of Thorn and Bone.

== Plot summary ==
In this third novel of the series, Anne Dare continues her flight from her Uncle's minions, with the help of the dessrator Cazio and the knight Sir Neil MeqVren. The Holter Aspar White and the monk Stephen Darige continue on their own path, attempting to unravel the mysteries of the Briar King. Anne's mother, Queen Muriele, remains imprisoned by the usurper, Robert, while the musician Leoff engages in a dangerous game of deceit with Robert, attempting to recreate a lost dark art.
