= The Charnel Prince =

Novel by Gregory Keyes

- First edition
- Author: Greg Keyes
- Cover artist: Stephen Youll
- Language: English
- Series: The Kingdoms of Thorn and Bone
- Genre: Fantasy
- Publisher: Del Rey Books
- Publication date: 17 August 2004
- Publication place: United States
- Media type: Print (hardback & paperback)
- Pages: 528 pp
- ISBN: 0-345-44067-6
- OCLC: 54881801
- Dewey Decimal: 813/.54 22
- LC Class: PS3561.E79 C48 2004
- Preceded by: The Briar King
- Followed by: The Blood Knight

The Charnel Prince is a fantasy novel by Greg Keyes. It is a sequel to The Briar King and the second book of The Kingdoms of Thorn and Bone.

== Plot summary ==
In this sequel to The Briar King, Anne, her maid Austra, and her protectors Cazio and z'Acatto are working to earn passage by sea to her home in Eslen, while trying to keep a low profile. Anne and Austra experience further trials with their friendship and Anne learns more about her destiny and undergoes a transformation into a mature and powerful adult. Sir Neil, against his wishes, and still haunted by the death of his love, Fastia, travels south to find Anne and meets with treachery and unexpected kindness. Meanwhile, Aspar, Winna, and Stephen Darige are tasked by Praifec Hespero to hunt down and kill the awakened Briar King. However, they discover that his presence might not be as harmful as the Church fears and discover more evidence that makes them question the Church's motives. Queen Muriele governs Eslen with a much wiser hand than her husband ever did, but she is faced with many challenges and finds unexpected allies. The book ends with her in prison after a palace coup by her brother-in-law Sir Robert, who has literally returned from the dead, but she has managed to keep her son safe and out of harm's way.

In addition to the familiar characters from The Briar King, The Charnel Prince introduced a new main character, a composer and a musical genius Leovigild "Leoff" Ackenzal. Heading to the royal castle to meet the late king William. Leoff accidentally stumbles on an evil plot to drown the Lowlands under waters. He helps to thwart the attempt and becomes a small hero. This helps him to get a position as the court composer and to start his masterwork, an opera-styled musical composition that brings together singers and an orchestra of 30 players for the first time in the history of the world. However, to finish his work, he has to find his way through the complex political situation of the court and the censorship of Praifec Hespero.

== Characters in "The Charnel Prince" ==
- Anne Dare, daughter and potential heir to the Empire of Crotheny
- Murielle Dare, of the House of Liery, Queen Mother who is ruling the empire as regent for her "saint-touched" son.
- Sir Robert Dare, brother of the late King William, he is truly twisted. Through Muriele's curse, which brought him back to life and broke the law of death, he is alive, but not alive, but still wants the throne of Crotheny
- Charles Dare, "saint-touched" son of the late King William and now king himself
- Sir Neil MeqVren, of Skern, sworn protector of Queen Muriele, is steadfast and honorable.
- Stephen Darige, of Virgenya, scholar and monk
- Aspar White, the King's forester, gruff, grumpy, but honorable
- Winna, Aspar's significant other
- Cazio Pachiomadio da Chiovattio, practicer of the art of desserata, in love with Anne though unaware of who she is
- z'Acatto, Cazio's instructor and friend
- Austra, Anne's maid. Has a romantic interest towards Cazio, encouraged by his attention towards her to make Anne jealous.
- Lady Gramme, the late King's mistress, still aspiring for the throne
- Mery Gramme, (new character) young daughter of Lady Gramme and the late King William, who befriends Leoff and has a musical gift.
- Alis Berrye, former mistress of the late king, who ends up surprising everyone
- Countess Orchaevia, A lively countess, a friend to Cazio and z'Acatto. She also has a connection to the coven of St. Cer.
- Praifec Marché Hespero, the leader of the local church that claims to follow Saints, but is proving to be more and more corrupted.
- Fend, the one-eyed Sefry and Aspar's nemesis
- Leshya, Sefry-female who joins Aspar and his companions on their quest.
- Leovigild "Leoff" Ackenzal, (new character), Crotheny's new court composer, is a musical genius, an innocent in the ways of the court who quickly learns and has to take sides. Noble and generous-hearted.
- Gilmer Oercsun (new character), windsmith, helped Leoff to thwart the plot at Broogh.
- Sir Artwair (new character), a loyal knight to the throne, helped Leoff to thwart the plot at Broogh.
- Ehawk (new character), a young boy whose family lives in the King's Forest. Serves as a guide first to the knights of the Church and then to Aspar White and his companions.

== Major themes ==
The struggle between good and evil is not as simple as it can seem. Characters are challenged to question "truths".

== Allusions/references to actual history, geography and current science ==
Greg Keyes weaves in his background in history, anthropology and folklore. The ancestress of the Dares who rule Crotheny is Virgenya Dare, who came over two thousand years before with settlers who thought they were going to a land called Virginia. They settled on a stretch of land and called it Virginia presumably, though by the time of the novel it has been corrupted to Virgenya. Clearly a reference to the first child born in the New World, Virginia Dare, and Virginia Colony.

A more obscure reference is that of Marcomir of Hansa, who has an heir, presumably his son, named Beremund. Their race is modeled upon the ancient Germanic tribes, quite possibly the Franks. The use of the name Marcomer, a Frankish chieftain of antiquity, and his son Pharamond, serves to reinforce the cultural reference.

== Release details ==
- 2004, USA, Del Rey Books ISBN 0-345-44067-6, Pub date 17 August 2004, Hardback
- 2005, USA, Del Rey Books ISBN 0-345-44071-4, Pub date 25 October 2005, Paperback

== Sources, references, external links, quotations ==
- sfsite.com
- http://www.sffworld.com/brevoff/83.html
