= Dragon Age: Last Flight =

2014 fantasy novel

- Cover of the original edition of Dragon Age: Last Flight
- Author: Liane Merciel
- Illustrator: Stefano Martino, Andres Ponce, German Ponce, Alvaro Sarraseca (deluxe edition)
- Language: English
- Series: Dragon Age
- Genre: Fantasy
- Publisher: Tor Books (NA); Titan Books (UK); Dark Horse Books (deluxe edition)
- Publication date: September 16, 2014; September 17, 2019 (deluxe edition)
- Publication place: United States
- Media type: Original - Print (Paperback); Deluxe Edition - Print (Hardcover)
- Pages: 304; 272 (deluxe edition)
- ISBN: 978-1-466-83134-6
- OCLC: 1466831340

Dragon Age: Last Flight is a fantasy novel released on September 16, 2014, and written by Liane Merciel. The novel is set in Thedas, the setting for the role-playing video game franchise Dragon Age. The novel is centered on two characters: a young elven mage named Valya who is recently recruited into the Grey Wardens and rediscovers the last of the griffons, once serving as steeds for the Wardens and was thought to be extinct after their kind died off at the end of the Fourth Blight; and her predecessor who lived during the Fourth Flight, an elven mage named Isseya who practiced blood magic and was the sister of the hero Garahel who slew the Archdemon Andoral to end the Fourth Blight.

Movies Games and Tech ran a promotion in November 2014, to celebrate the release of Last Flight by giving away three copies of the book. A deluxe edition was released by Dark Horse Books in September 2019, featuring new illustrations by Stefano Martino, Andres Ponce, German Ponce and Alvaro Sarraseca.

== Plot ==
In the year 9:41 Dragon Age, the elven mage Valya and a group of mages from the Circle of Magi in Hossberg join the Grey Wardens at Weisshaupt for safety from the ongoing Mage-Templar War. With rebel templars rampaging through Thedas and rebel mages assembling a terrifying army at Andoral's Reach, the Wardens are the only safe harbor for both neutral mages and templars seeking to flee the conflict. Upon reaching Weisshaupt, Valya is tasked to search the fortress' library for accounts of Wardens abandoning their posts and behaving unusually, as well as records of talking Darkspawn, beginning with the Fourth Blight. From these instructions, Valya locates a lyrium-laced war map inscribed with Elvish, which leads her to a hidden journal detailing the last days of the elven blood mage Warden Isseya and her brother, the legendary hero Garahel who ended the Fourth Blight.

As she reads Isseya's first-hand account of the battles during the Exalted Age, the journal reveals that during the Wardens' struggle to defend and evacuate Antiva City, as well as secure the assistance of the Free Marches in ending the Fourth Blight, Isseya was tasked by the First Warden to put the Wardens' griffons through a Joining ritual. This ritual ultimately led to the creatures' corruption. As Garahel and the Wardens attempt, along with the dwarven Warden-Commander of Antiva, Turab, to secure Antiva City and also make diplomatic ties with Starkhaven's ruling family, the Vaels, Isseya also begins to regret condemning the griffons to madness and death. In secret she contrives a way to remove the taint from griffon hatchlings and contain it within herself, sacrificing herself by accelerating the taint within her body. This effort becomes particularly poignant after her brother falls slaying the archdemon Andoral during the Battle of Ayesleigh, along with the deaths of many of the mature griffons and their Warden riders in the final battle of the Fourth Blight.

Isseya manages to purge the taint from a clutch of eggs obtained from Amadis Vael's griffon. Amadis was Garahel's lover and the eggs of her griffon, Smoke, were sired by Garahel's griffon, Crookytail. Convinced the Wardens of her era are not fit stewards of the griffons and hoping those of the future will be, Isseya uses magic to hide the eggs in suspended animation in a remote location that would later become home to a statue of Andraste, the "Red Bride." Isseya hid her journal away somewhere in Weisshaupt and left with her griffon, Revas on one last flight.

Driven by her research to find this treasure in the present day, Valya then travels with a small group of companions to the site and is able to reanimate the eggs. They hatch, one chick in particular looking identical to Garahel's Crookytail. The hatchlings appear to be free of the taint, bringing Valya hope that they will rise again.

== Reception ==
Nate Hohl from GameCrate claimed that Last Flight is essential for fans of the Dragon Age series, but noted that it is "not a perfect story" and the mileage the reader get out of the novel is contingent on their interest and/or familiarity with Dragon Age lore. He scored Last Flight 7.8 out of 10, commenting that the novel covers an important point in the Grey Warden's backstory and also tells a coming of age story for two different protagonists, calling it a must-buy for enthusiasts of the Dragon Age franchise, or book collectors who might want to add an engaging new fantasy novel to add to their collection. Dominika "Mara" Bieńkowska from the Polish website Nerdheim scored Last Flight 7 out of 10. In her "Sleeps With Monsters" column on Tor.com, reviewer Liz Bourke commented that Last Flight is a solid tragic adventure story with "compelling characters, plenty of desperate last stands, and a fair amount of hack-and-slash". She praised Last Flight for being "much better written, and much better put together, than any of the previous tie-ins", and that its narrative did not rely on prior knowledge of the Dragon Age setting, "while successfully managing to avoid the worst flaws of RPG tie-in novels".

Keri Honea from Playstation Lifestyle noted that Last Flight answered a very important question about the fate of the griffons; she noted that the creatures feature very prominently in the heraldry and lore of the Grey Wardens throughout the Dragon Age series, and that Last Flight indicated that there appears to be a future for these creatures. Honea recommended Last Flight, commenting that fans of the series should read Liane Merciel's novel.

Dennard Dayle from AIPT reviewed the deluxe edition of Last Flight and rated it 4.5 out of 10, questioning "Who is this book for?" He noted that the Dragon Age setting is inspired and has resonant environmental themes, and that the novel itself had quality art inserts, but claimed that the reader "wouldn't know it thumbing through Last Flight". He criticized the novel's "arid prose", stale plotting and lack of wit, and expressed concerns that a "quick, thinly thought-through cash-in" like Last Flight might hurt the brand just like Mass Effect: Andromeda did to the Mass Effect franchise.
