= Ellen Beeman =

American fantasy and science fiction author, television

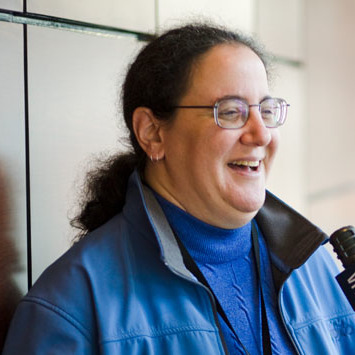
- Ellen Beeman at Game Design Expo 2009
- Occupations: Independent Game Developer, Instructor at DigiPen Institute of Technology
- Website: https://www.ellenbeeman.com/

Ellen Guon Beeman is an American fantasy and science fiction author, television screenwriter and computer game designer/producer. She has published four novels and has worked on over 40 video games.

== Career in the game industry ==
Ellen Beeman describes herself as "mom, videogame designer and producer, author, gadget geekette, Celtic fiddler, former TV writer and city commissioner, etc."

In 1989, Beeman left a career in television writing, and was hired by Sierra Online as a project manager. She worked as a writer and project manager at Origin Systems for several Wing Commander titles.

Beeman worked on five games in the Wing Commander series before deciding to move away from sci-fi aerial combat games. She described her experience working on the games as intense, recalling how the images of spaceship afterburners became so ingrained in her mind that she felt she needed to take a break from the genre. This led her to leave Origin Systems, where she had worked on the Wing Commander series.

Despite her departure from the franchise, Beeman has expressed that Wing Commander II remains one of the projects she is most proud of in her career. She noted that, while she moved on from the genre, the impact of the game and the work she did on it, holds a special place in her professional achievements.

In 2006, she was ranked in the top 100 most influential women in the game industry by Edge Online (formerly next-gen.biz). At the time, she was Lead Program Manager at Microsoft Casual Games, a producer role.

Beeman has also been credited at Monolith Productions, Electronic Arts and Disney. She has lectured at many video game industry conferences, including Game Developers Conference, LOGIN, SXSW Interactive, Microsoft Gamefest, PAX and PAX Dev, and Game Design Expo. She is one of the founders, as well as, formerly, the Program Chair for Women in Games International.

As of 2019, she is an independent video game developer and consultant in Kirkland, Washington, and an associate professor at DigiPen Institute of Technology.

== Television ==
- MoonDreamers (1986)
- Jem (1986–1987)
- Dinosaucers (1987)

== Books ==
- Knight of Ghosts and Shadows (1990) with Mercedes Lackey
- Summoned to Tourney (1992) with Mercedes Lackey
- Freedom Flight (1992) with Mercedes Lackey
- Bedlam Boyz (1993)
- Shahrezad and other stories (2011)
- The New Professional Programmer's Guide: Code Samples (2020)
- The HOTLOGIC Mini Cookbook: Recipes for Everyone (2023)

=== Short fiction ===
- Shahrezad (1996)
- From Your Mouth to God’s Ear (1996)
- Disney on Ice (1997)
- Six-Shooter (2005)

== Video games ==
- Hoyle's Official Book of Games: Volume 1 (1989) (writer)
- Conquests of Camelot: The Search for the Grail (1990) (special thanks)
- King's Quest I: Quest for the Crown (1990) (special thanks)
- Wing Commander: The Secret Missions (1990) (writer)
- Wing Commander: The Secret Missions 2 - Crusade (1991) (writer, director)
- Wing Commander II: Vengeance of the Kilrathi (1991) (writer, assistant director)
- Wing Commander II: Vengeance of the Kilrathi - Special Operations 1 (1991) (writer)
- Wing Commander II: Vengeance of the Kilrathi - Special Operations 2 (1992) (writer, consulting director)
- Pickle Wars (1994) (writer)
- Rescue the Scientists (1994) (producer)
- Might and Magic: Swords of Xeen (1995) (writer)
- This Means War! (1995) (project manager)
- Contract J.A.C.K. (2003) (producer)
- The Matrix Online (2005) (producer)
- Hexic 2 (2007) (executive producer)
- Dash of Destruction (2008) (executive producer)
- South Park Let's Go Tower Defense Play! (2009) (lead producer)
- Toy Soldiers (2010) (producer)
- Marvel Super Hero Squad Online (2011) (producer)
- Enchant U (2012) (producer)

== See also ==
- List of women in the video game industry
- Women and video games
