= Bot Colony =

- Developer: North Side Inc.
- Designer: Eugene Joseph
- Engine: Vision Engine
- Platform: Microsoft Windows
- Genre: Graphic adventure
- Mode: Single-player

Bot Colony is an episodic adventure game by Montreal developer North Side Inc. In the game, the player uses a natural language parser to converse with robot characters. The game is played through a PC client, whose major functions are running the 3D world, speech-to-text, and communication with the server, the game's language processing and reasoning running on a server farm. The developer has written a novel of the same name, published in December 2010.

After early prototypes in 2009 and a failed Kickstarter campaign in October 2013, the game was featured on Steam Greenlight in November 2013. It was cancelled in January 2015 because of low sales, but became available again in spring 2017 with an added introductory mission.

== Plot ==
Bot Colony is set on Agrihan, an island in the Marianas in the Pacific, in 2021. Agrihan has become the private island of Nakagawa Corp, a large Japanese robot company, which relocated its R&D and manufacturing facilities there both to accommodate its rapid growth and to escape relentless industrial espionage by its fierce competitor, the North Korean KHT Corp. A 900-metre (3,000 ft) tall volcano covered with lush jungle rises from the centre of the island, surrounded by pristine beaches and coves. The traditional Japanese village on the island's western shore contrasts with the skyscrapers housing Nakagawa's R&D and living quarters on the northern side. People intermix naturally with robots on the island. As Nakagawa's robots will play a major role in the colonization of Mars, they need to achieve a high degree of autonomy.

The player takes on the role of a specialist in robot cognition, who occasionally accepts challenging assignments involving white-collar crime. Nakagawa Corp calls the player and asks them to investigate the disappearance of three new-generation sensors. The player is warned that KHT may have infiltrated the island and will stop at nothing to get its hands on the sensors. The game starts with the player landing in an area of the island mostly staffed by robots and hence known as "Bot Colony". The player can fly through the island in a futuristic hovercraft, sail around it, or use rickshaw robots to move on its roads. Robots travel between facilities on the island using a specially designed monorail.

The game explores the circumstances of "artificially intelligent" robots reprogrammed by a devious spy to "do as people do", and to learn about human motivation and emulate human behaviour. While engaged in the adventure, the player probes the boundaries of knowledge and understanding of robots, and trades knowledge about humanity for robot information that will enable him to move on in the game.

The player's mission evolves from finding the sensors to chasing the North Korean spy who has indeed infiltrated the island. The first part of the Bot Colony novel relates how KHT managed to infiltrate Bot Colony. Towards the game's conclusion, the player is instrumental in preventing the outbreak of global war.

== Gameplay ==
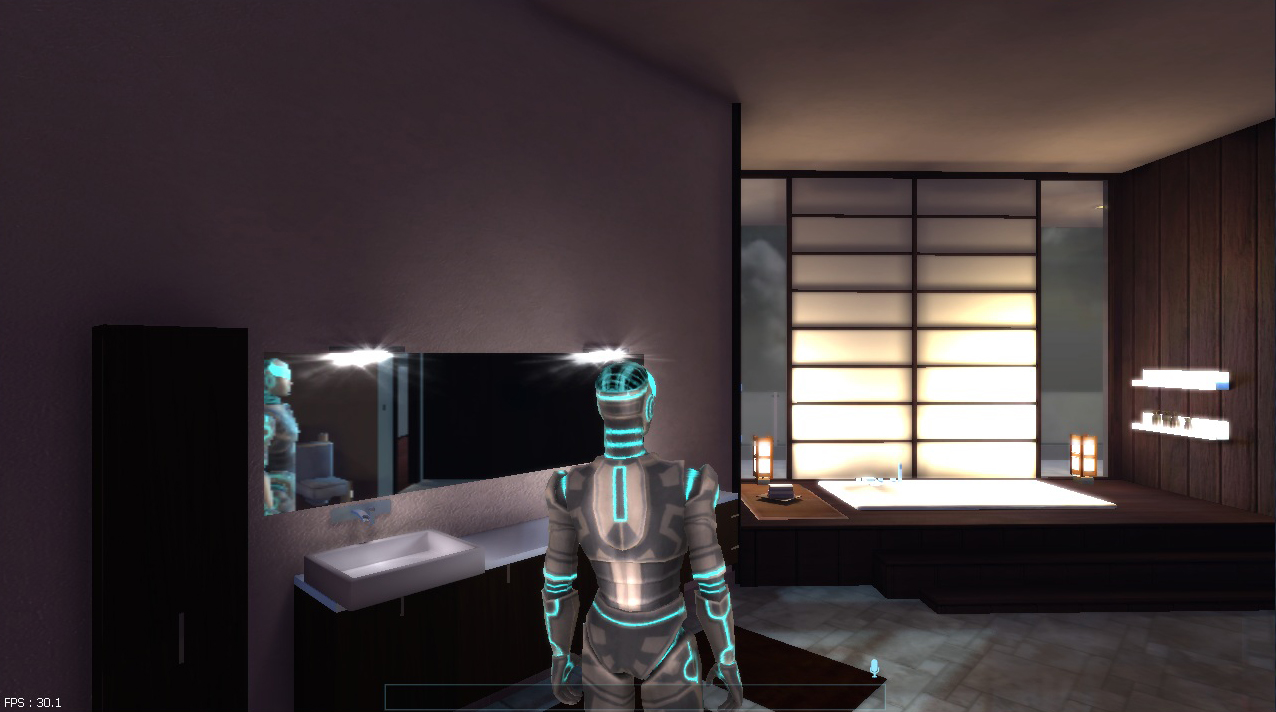
In-game render of robot Jimmy, Intruder, interior

The player communicates with the game by speaking into a microphone, and the game uses speech-to-text software to interpret and react to the spoken words. Before beginning the game, a player is usually required to build an acoustic profile and train speech-to-text, unless typing is preferred.

The player will need to control robots, vehicles, or cranes to complete missions, and may advance the story by playing cards or trading in the Bazaar, discussing food with a robotic waiter in the restaurant, training robotic animals to do tricks on the kabuki stage, or investigating a crime against a robot in Old Nakagawa. To compensate for the freedom nature of the game, intelligent help is provided in the form of Miki-05 (the player's PDA) through a conversational interface.

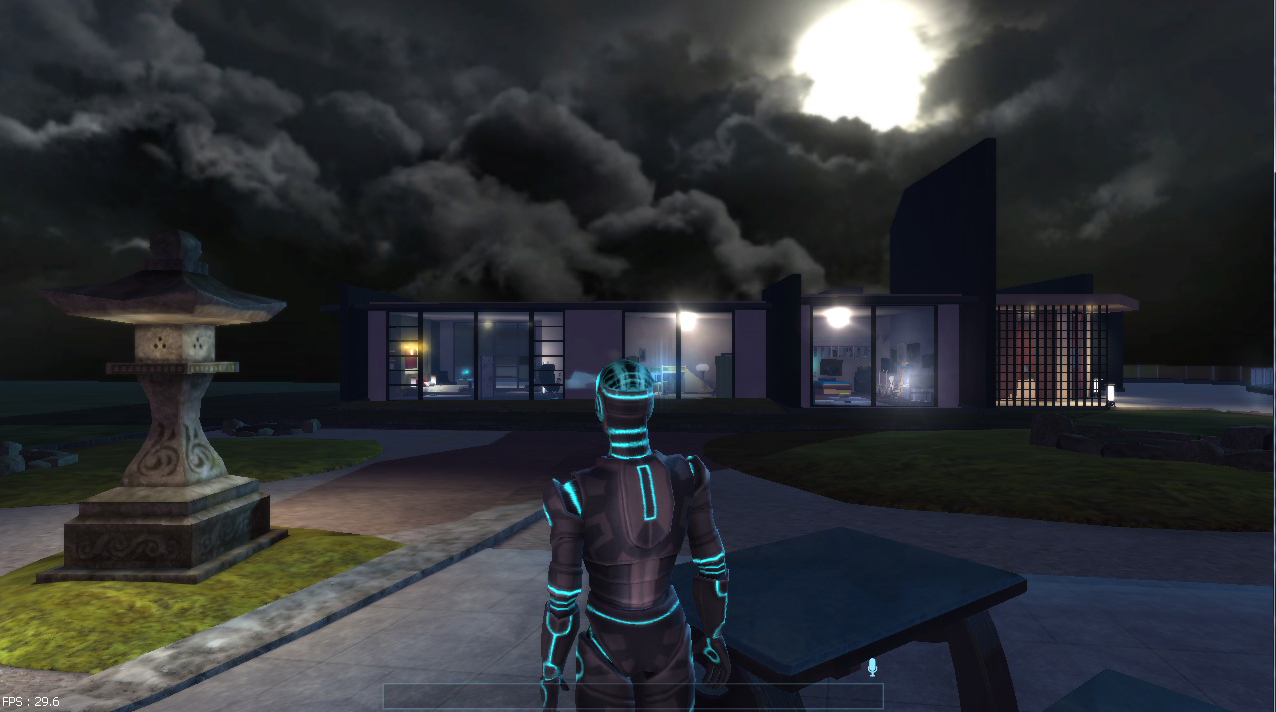
In-game render of robot Jimmy, Intruder, exterior

The player is forced to converse in order to advance in the game. North Side see this as an advance over some current state-of-the-art video games, in which the player chooses a pre-written selection from a dialogue tree. In Bot Colony the player can discover the story organically by querying characters about their environment and events they witnessed, guiding robots through complex tasks, negotiating transactions with robots and teaching them new concepts and new animations. These conversation-based interactions are mediated by speech-to-text and text-to-speech solutions integrated into the North Side dialogue pipeline as client and server side components.

== Development ==
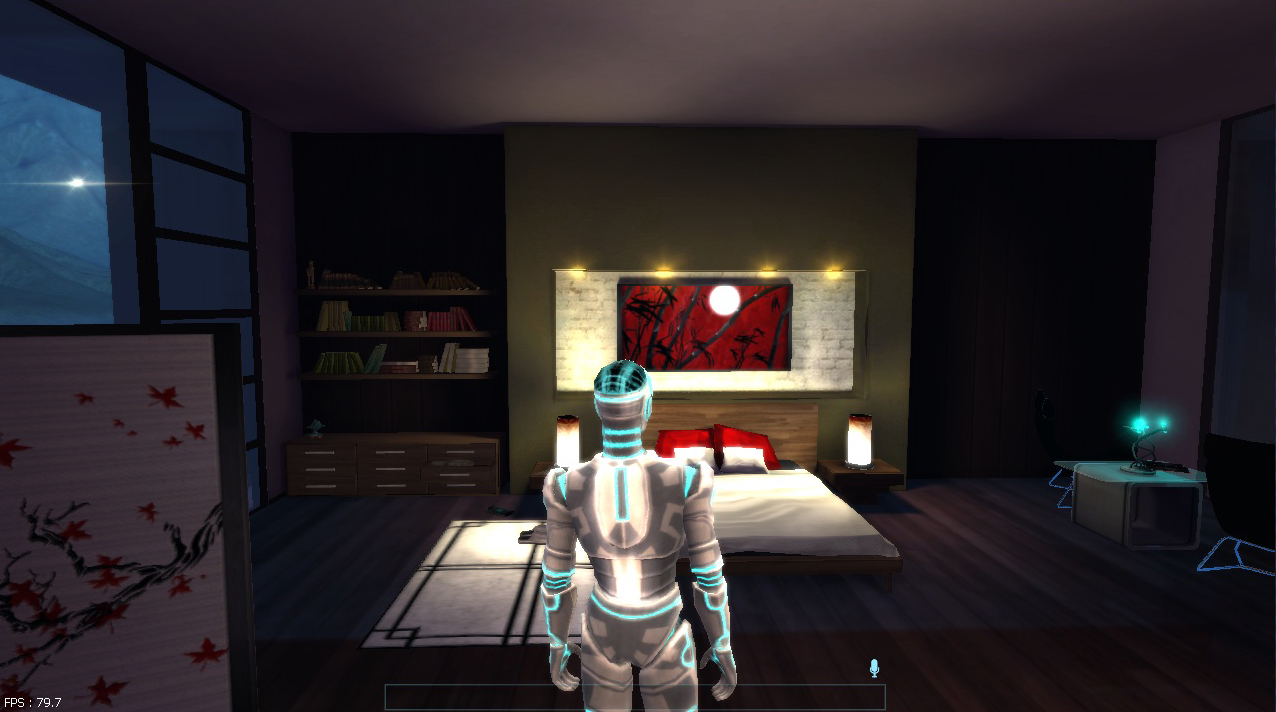
Bot Colony uses Havok Vision for rendering

North Side Inc. started research on its natural language processing technology when it was founded in 2001, and at least initially, the business plan was to apply English to rapid scripting of simulations and scenarios. Bot Colony was first storyboarded in October 2007, when North Side decided that producing a video game was the best initial application of the company's natural language understanding and natural language generation technologies. The company invested in its own game engine, Anitron, as a test-bed for researching the integration of 3D graphics with language. As Anitron lacked rendering, the game was reworked with Havok Vision.

The game's logic, animations and interactions are written in an English-based scripting language. A script describes in simple English how a game entity should react, when its context and probable goals are taken into account. North Side see their English-based scripting technology as having additional applications, such as rapid visualization of movie scripts, workflow visualization, evidence presentation, and exploring alternative courses of action. The developers also hope that the scripting language will enable players to extend the game world with their own content in a MMO environment in which players compete in some area (as in a Jeopardy!-style game for robots) or cooperate in a task. North Side plan for users to be able to design their own 3D content and deploy their own intelligent characters, inviting other users to experience their creations in the form of 3D animated shorts or games.

The NLP technology cost $20 million and the game itself $2 to $3 million to the developer.

Early technology prototypes were shown at GDC in San Francisco in March 2009 and at E3 in June 2010. A closed beta was announced on 13 November 2012 at the Montreal International Game Summit and featured the training level of the game, "Intruder". In "Intruder", the player remote-controls a robot to erase the traces of an intrusion, and discovers part of the background story through conversation with Jimmy, a domestic robot. A closed alpha of Bot Colony was started in March 2013 and was extended in June of the same year. An unsuccessful Kickstarter funding campaign ran for the game in October 2013, after which the game was added to the Steam Greenlight system in November 2013.

Bot Colony was cancelled on 29 January 2015 because of low sales; it had sold 814 units and made $10,000 of revenue. However, after fan protests it was made available again in spring 2017, with an added introductory mission.

== Reception ==
A 2014 Rock Paper Shotgun review concluded, "When [Bot Colony] works, it's oddly satisfying. When it doesn't work, it's generally amusing." A review on the same site in April 2017 was more negative, finding the game even more "janky" than expected, the story thin, and the tasks uninteresting.
