= Gregory Keyes =

American novelist

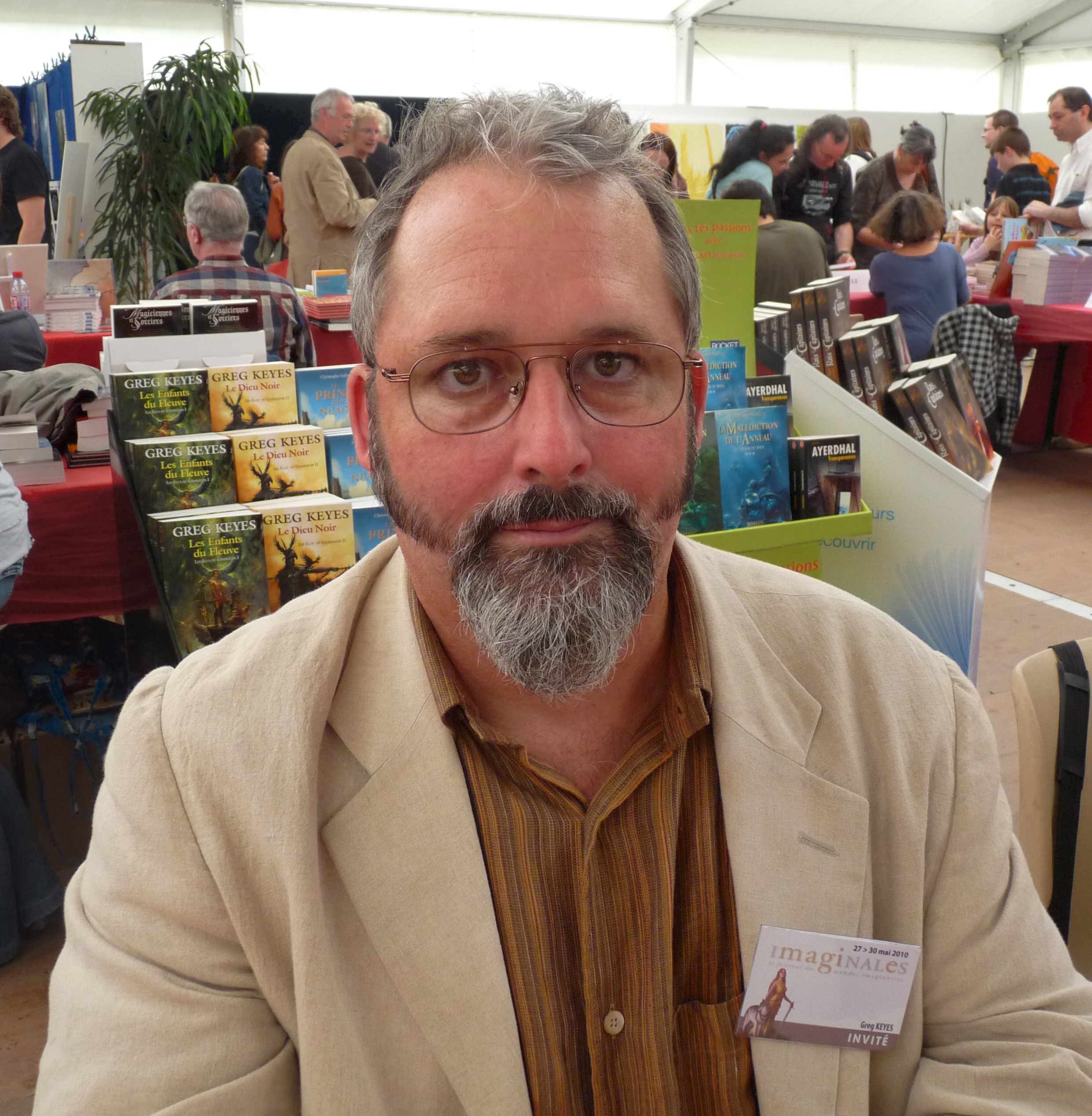
- Keyes in 2010
- Born: John Gregory Keyes; April 11, 1963 (age 63); Meridian, Mississippi, U.S.
- Education: Mississippi State University; University of Georgia
- Occupation: Novelist
- Writing career
- Genres: Fantasy, science fiction

Gregory Keyes (born April 11, 1963) is an American writer of science fiction and fantasy who has written both original and media-related novels under both the names J. Gregory Keyes and Greg Keyes.

== Early life ==
Keyes was born in Meridian, Mississippi, as John Gregory Keyes. He received degrees in anthropology from Mississippi State University and the University of Georgia before becoming a full-time writer.

== Writing career ==
He is famous for his tetralogy The Age of Unreason, a steampunk/alchemical story featuring Benjamin Franklin and Isaac Newton. He wrote the Babylon 5 Psi Corps trilogy, a history of the Psi Corps and a biography of Psi Corps member Alfred Bester.

In 2003 he began a fantasy series titled The Kingdoms of Thorn and Bone, the first volume of which was The Briar King. The second book in the series The Charnel Prince was published in 2004 and the third, The Blood Knight, was published in July 2006. His fourth and final book of the quartet, The Born Queen, was released in March 2008.

In 2009 it was announced that Keyes would be writing two novels based on the successful computer game The Elder Scrolls IV: Oblivion. The first of these, The Infernal City, was published by Random House in November 2009. The second, Lord of Souls, went on sale on September 27, 2011.

== Style ==
Greg Keyes builds his stories around multiple point of view characters who meet only rarely, but allow the reader to follow different threads of the same events. Most of the chapters in his books focus on only one of the POV characters, but sometimes multiple. His chapters often end in a surprise or a cliffhanger as the story moves to follow another character.

Keyes's knowledge of fencing and linguistics also figures heavily in his books. For example, Stephen Darige, one of the main characters in The Kingdoms of Thorn and Bone, is an adept linguist, and his knowledge and skills play an important role in the development of the story.

== Works ==
=== Chosen of the Changeling ===
- The Waterborn (1996), ISBN 0-345-40393-2
- The Blackgod (1997), ISBN 0-345-40394-0

=== The Age of Unreason ===
- Newton's Cannon (1998), ISBN 1-56865-829-X
- A Calculus of Angels (1999), ISBN 0-7394-0260-9
- Empire of Unreason (2000), ISBN 0-345-40609-5
- The Shadows of God (2001), ISBN 0-345-43904-X

=== Babylon 5: The Psi Corps Trilogy ===
- Dark Genesis: The Birth of the Psi Corps (1998), ISBN 0-345-42715-7
- Deadly Relations: Bester Ascendant (1999), ISBN 0-345-42716-5
- Final Reckoning: The Fate of Bester (1999), ISBN 0-345-42717-3

=== Star Wars: The New Jedi Order ===
- Edge of Victory I: Conquest (2001), ISBN 0-345-42864-1
- Edge of Victory II: Rebirth (2001), ISBN 0-345-44610-0
- "Emissary of the Void" (2002), short story published in Star Wars Gamer, issues 8–10, and Star Wars Insider, issues 62–64
- The Final Prophecy (2003), ISBN 0-345-42875-7

=== The Kingdoms of Thorn and Bone ===
- The Briar King (2003), ISBN 0-345-44066-8
- The Charnel Prince (2004), ISBN 0-345-44067-6
- The Blood Knight (2006), ISBN 0-345-44068-4
- The Born Queen (2008), ISBN 0-345-44069-2

=== The Elder Scrolls ===
- The Infernal City (2009), ISBN 978-0-345-50801-0 - based on The Elder Scrolls video game series
- Lord of Souls (2011), ISBN 978-0-345-50802-7 - based on The Elder Scrolls video game series

=== The High and Faraway Series ===
- The Reign of the Departed (2018), ISBN 1-543680-30-5
- Kingdoms of the Cursed (2019), ISBN 1-597809-95-0
- The Realm of the Deathless (2022)

=== Other ===
- The Hounds of Ash: and Other Tales of Fool Wolf (2008), ISBN 1-894063-09-0
- Dawn of the Planet of the Apes: Firestorm (2014), ISBN 978-1783292257
- XCOM 2: Resurrection (2015), ISBN 978-1608877126
- Interstellar: The Movie Novelization (2014), ISBN 978-1783293698
- Independence Day: Crucible (2016), ISBN 978-1785651304
- War for the Planet of the Apes: Revelations (2016), ISBN 978-1785654725
- Planet of the Apes: Caesar's Story (2018), ISBN 978-0316485395
- Godzilla: King Of The Monsters - The Movie Novelization (2019)
- Marvel's Avengers: The Extinction Key (2020)
- Godzilla: Dominion (2021)
- Godzilla vs. Kong: The Movie Novelization (2021)
- Godzilla x Kong: The New Empire - The Movie Novelization (2024)
