= Liane Merciel =

American novelist

- Occupations: Author, lawyer
- Writing career
- Pen name: Liane Merciel
- Language: English
- Period: 2010–present
- Genre: Fantasy
- Notable work: Ithelas series.
- Website: lianemerciel.com

Liane Merciel is the pseudonym of an American fantasy author.

Merciel is of Korean and European ancestry. She grew up in Germany, South Korea, and other locations in a military family. A graduate of Yale University and the College of William & Mary Law School, she is a practicing attorney in Pennsylvania.

Liane Merciel is the author of the ongoing Ithelas series of fantasy novels. She has also written one novel for the Dragon Age fantasy franchise, and three novels (Nightglass, Nightblade and Hellknight) for Paizo Publishing's Pathfinder Tales series, set in the Pathfinder roleplaying game world of Golarion. As part of the 'Pathfinder War of Immortals Meta-Event', Paizo revealed Pathfinder: Godsrain a novel written by Merciel, which set to be released in November 2024.

== Bibliography ==
- The River King's Road (2010)
- Heaven's Needle (2011)
- Nightglass (2012)
- Dragon Age: Last Flight (2014)
- Blacktalon (2023)
- Nightblade (2014)
- Pathfinder Tales: Hellknight (2016)
- Pathfinder: Godsrain (2024)
