= Gavin Smith (author) =

Scottish writer (born 1973)

Gavin G. Smith
- Occupation: Novelist
- Writing career
- Genre: Science Fiction
- Website: gavingsmith.com

Gavin Grant Smith is a Scottish science fiction writer who was born in Dundee, Scotland in 1968. He is the author of the Veteran series. He has a degree in writing for film and a Masters in medieval history.

== Works ==
=== Standalone works ===
1. Crysis: Escalation (February 2013) Crysis 3 video-game tie-in
2. Special Purposes: First Strike Weapon (April 2017) re-issued as Spec Ops Z (February 2021)
3. Bloodshot (February 2020) novelisation of Bloodshot (film)
4. Original Sin (October 2022) novelisation of Marvel's Original Sin (comics)

=== Veteran series ===
1. Veteran (June 2010) nominated for 2011 John W. Campbell Memorial Award for Best Science Fiction Novel
2. War in Heaven (September 2011)
3. The Veteran Omnibus (February 2018) collection of Veteran, War in Heaven and five short stories

=== Bastard Legion series ===
1. The Bastard Legion (January 2017) (originally The Hangman's Daughter)
2. The Bastard Legion: Friendly Fire (October 2017)
3. The Bastard Legion: War Criminals (July 2018)

=== Age of Scorpio trilogy ===
1. The Age of Scorpio (November 2012)
2. A Quantum Mythology (March 2015)
3. The Beauty of Destruction (January 2016)

=== Collaborative works ===
These were all co-written with Stephen Deas under the combined name "Gavin Deas".

1. Elite: Wanted (May 2014) Elite Dangerous video-game tie-in
2. Empires: Extraction (November 2014)
3. Empires: Infiltration (November 2014)
4. Empires: The First Battle (November 2014) omnibus of Empires: Extraction and Empires: Infiltration
