= Wing Commander (novel series) =

Novels based on Wing Commander games

Several novels based on the Wing Commander games have been released by Baen Books.

== Freedom Flight ==
The novel describes the Firekka campaign of the Tiger's Claw, featuring also the defection of Lord Ralgha (known as Hobbes in Wing Commander II and III). Published by Baen Books in 1992

Freedom Flight was written by Mercedes Lackey and Ellen Guon.

== End Run ==
The novel tells the story of a daring Confederation plan to weaken the Kilrathi Imperial family by attacking the planet of Vukar Tag. A strike force led by the TCS Tarawa must head to the heart of the Kilrathi Empire to divert part of the Kilrathi fleet. Set after Special Operations II and before Wing Commander III. Published by Baen Books in 1994

End Run was written by Christopher Stasheff and William R. Forstchen.

== Fleet Action ==
Published in 1994 and written by William R. Forstchen, Fleet Action concerns a false armistice offered by the Kilrathi Empire, and the efforts of a few Terran Confederation soldiers to circumvent it.

The Kilrathi have been severely weakened by the most recent Confederation attacks and their new fleet of secretly built carriers will not be finished for another year and so they try to lure the Confederation into a trap and sue for a false peace. However, some daring Confed personnel try to prove the existence of the secret Kilrathi fleet and in the end, the fate of humanity is decided in a gigantic battle for Earth. The novel is set after End Run and before Wing Commander III.

Because of the novel's popularity, a fan-made project, Wing Commander: Standoff, has brought the novel into gameplay using Wing Commander Prophecy's "Vision" engine. As of April 10, 2009, the project has been completed.

== Heart of the Tiger ==
A novelization of Wing Commander III, it is written by Andrew Keith and William R. Forstchen and published by Baen Books in 1995. Though it ignores a number of the game's more trivial missions, it adds a great deal more personality to the crew of TCS Victory, and includes a scene that was cut from the actual game: an explanation from a traitor, explaining their otherwise-incomprehensible behavior (the game itself was criticized for excluding this vital scene, although the later 3DO and PlayStation versions of the game did include it along with other scenes that were originally shot but not included in the PC version).

== The Price of Freedom ==
A novelization of Wing Commander IV, it is written by Ben Ohlander and William R. Forstchen and published by Baen Books in 1995. It departs significantly from the plot of the video game: it trivializes several significant characters and plot developments, and totally rewrites game-established Border Worlds technology.

== Action Stations ==
The novel tells the story of the beginnings of the war, twenty years before the first game.

An interesting detail about this story is that it is presented as a historical drama, from the point of view of an author writing about the beginning of the war many years after the fact.

Several events in the novel bear more than a passing resemblance to the events before and during the 1941 attack on Pearl Harbor.

Action Stations was written by William R. Forstchen.

== False Colors ==
Published in 1998, the book was written by J. Andrew Keith and William R. Forstchen. Although William H. Keith, Andrew's brother, was incorrectly credited on the front cover, Andrew Keith's name appears as co-author throughout the text.

After the end of the Kilrathi war, powerful Kilrathi warlords are not satisfied with the peace and remain aggressive towards the Confederation and other organizations like the Landreich. Operatives of the Landreich try to salvage a Kilrathi supercarrier left over from the war to prevent a warlord from starting a second human-Kilrathi war.

Set after Wing Commander III and before Wing Commander IV, False Colors was intended as the first part of a trilogy. Co-author Andrew Keith died on August 7, 1999, before he could begin on the other books.

== Wing Commander ==
A novelization of the original movie script, which includes a traitor subplot filmed but cut from the final release. Wing Commander was written by Peter Telep.

== Pilgrim Stars ==
The second part of the movie novelization trilogy, Pilgrim Stars deals with a Pilgrim rebellion against the ruling Confederation. Pilgrim Stars was written by Peter Telep.

== Pilgrim Truth ==
The conclusion to the movie novel trilogy, Pilgrim Truth was never published. Pilgrim Truth was written by Peter Telep. It was finally released in 2011 with blessings by Electronic Arts and distributed through WCNews.com in online, mobi and epub versions.
