= Stephen Deas =

English fantasy author (born 1968)

- Born: 1968 (age 57–58)
- Occupation: Novelist
- Writing career
- Genre: Epic fantasy
- Notable work: Memory of Flames

Stephen Deas, born in 1968 in Southeast England, is an English fantasy author. He is most famous for his fantasy opus, the Memory of Flames sequence, set in a fantasy world inhabited by dragons.

== Biography ==
Deas was raised in a town full of army veterans. He has a bachelor's degree in theoretical physics at Cambridge University and had a job at BAE Systems, doing "mathsy stuff". He now lives in Essex, writes full-time, and is married and has two children, Christopher Raphael Deas and Evan Alexander Deas.

== Works ==
=== Memory of Flames ===
1. The Adamantine Palace (2009)
2. The King of the Crags (2010)
3. The Order of the Scales (2011)

=== Thief-Taker's Apprentice ===
1. The Thief-Taker's Apprentice (2010)
2. The Warlock's Shadow (2011)
3. The King's Assassin (2012)

=== Silver Kings ===
1. Dragon Queen (2013)
2. The Splintered Gods (2014)
3. The Black Mausoleum (2012)
4. The Silver Kings (2015)

=== Dominion ===
1. The Moonsteel Crown (2021)
2. The House of Cats and Gulls (2022)
3. Herald of the Black Moon (coming in 2023)

=== (As SK Sharp) ===
1. I Know What I Saw (2020)

=== (As Sam Peters) ===
1. From Darkest Skies (2017)
2. From Distant Stars (2018)
3. From Divergent Suns (2019)

=== (As Nathan Hawke) ===
1. The Crimson Shield (2013)
2. Cold Redemption (2013)
3. The Last Bastion (2013)

=== (As Gavin Deas, SF collaborations with SF author Gavin Smith) ===
1. Elite: Wanted (2014)
2. Empires: Infiltration (2014)
3. Empires: Extraction (2014)

=== (As Sapper) ===
1. Bulldog Drummond, Dead Man's Gate (2014)
2. Bulldog Drummond and the Faceless Men
3. Bulldog Drummond and the Jaguar Mask

=== (As S. J. Deas) ===
1. The Royalist (2014)
2. The Protector (2015)
