= Watch Dogs: Legion – Bloodline =

- Developer: Ubisoft Toronto
- Publisher: Ubisoft
- Director: Kent Hudson
- Writer: Kyle Francis
- Composer: Stephen Barton
- Series: Watch Dogs
- Platforms: Windows, PlayStation 4, PlayStation 5, Xbox One, Xbox Series X/S, Stadia, Amazon Luna
- Release: July 6, 2021
- Genre: Action-adventure
- Mode: Single-player

Watch Dogs: Legion – Bloodline is a 2021 downloadable content expansion for the action-adventure game Watch Dogs: Legion, developed by Ubisoft Toronto and published by Ubisoft. Released on July 6, 2021, the expansion is a prequel to the main campaign of Legion and follows two returning characters from earlier games in the series: Aiden Pearce, the protagonist of Watch Dogs, and Wrench, a major character from Watch Dogs 2.

Unlike Legion, where its central "play as anyone" mechanic allows players to recruit and control numerous procedurally generated London residents, Bloodline centres its campaign on Aiden and Wrench as authored protagonists with distinct abilities and fixed character arcs. The story concerns Aiden's attempt to reconnect with his estranged nephew Jackson while becoming embroiled in a conflict between Wrench and robotics executive Thomas Rempart. The expansion was subsequently extended through Watch Dogs: Stars & Stripes, which depicts Aiden shortly before the London storyline.

Bloodline received generally favorable review. Critics regarded its use of established protagonists and more personal storyline as an improvement over the narrative structure of Legion, although its reuse of the base game's London, missions and underlying mechanics attracted criticism. Commentary also focused on the expansion's reconsideration of Aiden's violent characterization in the original Watch Dogs and his attempts to repair his relationship with his family.

== Gameplay ==
Bloodline retains the third-person action-adventure gameplay and open-world London of Watch Dogs: Legion, including shooting, stealth, driving, drones and the ability to hack electronic devices. However, it removes the base game's recruitment system and instead divides the campaign between Aiden Pearce and Wrench. Each protagonist has a fixed selection of abilities, weapons and equipment tailored to his characterization.

Aiden's abilities emphasize firearms and direct disruption. His System Crash ability temporarily disables nearby electronics, while he can enter slow motion after performing a takedown and receive a temporary damage increase by correctly timing a reload. His hacking abilities include variants of mechanics from the original Watch Dogs, allowing him to interfere with communications and electronic equipment during infiltration or combat. Reviewers observed that his mechanics encourage a more aggressive style of play than many of the randomly generated operatives in Legion.

Wrench uses equipment reflecting the more anarchic tone associated with Watch Dogs 2. He can deploy a custom drone named Sergei, throw "Ninja Ball" flashbangs, wield a large hammer called Lady Smash, and use customized firearms including an MPX submachine gun and non-lethal grenade launcher. Some of his weapons can produce hacking effects on nearby enemies or electronic devices. Game Informer contrasted Aiden's comparatively controlled abilities with Wrench's more chaotic equipment, regarding their different play styles as an extension of their personalities.

The campaign includes additional optional activities for both characters. Aiden receives Resistance Missions, while Wrench can undertake Fixer Contracts; completing side missions unlocks additional upgrades for each character. Game Informer estimated that completing the main and side content required approximately six to eight hours, while Push Square estimated that players engaging with the broader package could spend around ten hours with it.

Season Pass owners can additionally use Aiden and Wrench as operatives in Legion's main campaign and online mode, retaining their distinctive abilities outside the Bloodline storyline.

== Plot ==
Some time after the Zero Day bombings, but before DedSec's resurgence in London, former vigilante Aiden Pearce accepts a contract from his fixer partner Jordi Chin in the city, partly because it gives him an opportunity to reconnect with his estranged nephew Jackson, who is attending college there. Aiden is tasked with infiltrating Broca Tech to photograph a robotics project headed by Thomas Rempart and steal a neural-interface device called the "BrocaBridge". During the infiltration he encounters Reginald "Wrench" Blechman, a former member of DedSec's San Francisco branch, who is also attempting to steal the device. The two fight, allowing Wrench to escape with the BrocaBridge while Aiden is captured by Rempart's security forces. After escaping, Aiden contacts Jackson, who reluctantly helps him establish contact with DedSec operative Connie Robinson. Rempart subsequently orders Aiden to retrieve the BrocaBridge and threatens Jackson if he refuses.

With Jackson's assistance, Aiden locates Wrench's hideout and confronts him. Wrench explains that Rempart had hired him to design a line of combat robots but later betrayed him and appropriated his work, prompting Wrench to steal the BrocaBridge in retaliation. Material found at Wrench's hideout also reveals that he had recently divorced his husband Zane, while messages from his former DedSec colleague Marcus Holloway concern Wrench's difficulty coping with the breakup. Rempart meanwhile abducts Jackson and offers to exchange him for the BrocaBridge. Wrench gives Aiden what appears to be the device, but has secretly replaced it with an explosive replica. When Aiden delivers it, the resulting explosion severely injures and disfigures Rempart and allows Aiden and Jackson to escape. Aiden is shot during the rescue and subsequently falls into a coma.

Wrench shelters Aiden and Jackson at his hideout while acquiring medical supplies for Aiden. Feeling partly responsible for his condition, he also takes over Aiden's fixer work and begins completing contracts for Jordi. Wrench is eventually contacted by Broca Tech founder Skye Larsen, who offers a possible means of reviving Aiden if Wrench first helps her regain control of facilities seized by Rempart. After Wrench does so, Larsen proposes using the BrocaBridge to establish a neural connection between Jackson and his unconscious uncle.

Jackson enters Aiden's mind and experiences distorted memories centred on Aiden's guilt over the death of Jackson's sister Lena seventeen years earlier. Aiden has continued to blame himself for initiating the events that led to her death and for subsequently allowing his identity as a vigilante to consume his life. Jackson helps him confront these memories and accept that continuing to punish himself will not undo the past. Aiden awakens from the coma, reconciles with Jackson and resolves to leave behind the obsessive vigilantism that had alienated him from his family.

With Aiden recovered, he, Jackson and Wrench turn their attention to Rempart, who attempts to flee London aboard his private barge with his remaining combat robots. Wrench boards the vessel while Aiden and Jackson assist him remotely, destroys Rempart's robotic forces and defeats him. Rather than killing Rempart, Wrench leaves him to be arrested by Albion authorities.

In the aftermath, Aiden and Wrench decide to continue working together. Connie later contacts them after discovering a survivor of DedSec's London branch and asks them to help rebuild the organization, leading into the events of the main campaign of Watch Dogs: Legion.

== Development and release ==
Ubisoft first disclosed its plans for Aiden and Wrench as part of Watch Dogs: Legion's post-launch content in October 2020. In an interview with Game Informer, live producer Lathieeshe Thillainathan said that fans had repeatedly asked what had happened to Aiden following the original game. The development team therefore wanted Bloodline to explore how he had changed in the intervening years and why he would return to active conflict. Thillainathan said the expansion would be focused specifically on Aiden and Wrench, with each receiving dedicated story content.

Although Clint Hocking directed Watch Dogs: Legion, Ubisoft told Gene Park of The Washington Post that Hocking was not involved in Bloodline. The expansion was instead directed by Kent Hudson, with Kyle Francis serving as lead writer. Park described their storyline as functioning as a sequel to both earlier Watch Dogs games, contrasting Aiden's increasingly self-conscious treatment with Wrench's intentionally exaggerated humor and gadgets.

Bloodline establishes that Wrench had previously formed a romantic relationship and marriage with another man. Although Wrench had attracted queer readings in the past, his sexuality had previously been left ambiguous prior to the release of Bloodline. In a 2016 interview following the release of Watch Dogs 2, the character's actor Shawn Baichoo was asked whether he viewed the character as entirely heterosexual. Baichoo said that he had performed Wrench as a "fairly straightforward hetero cis-male", but deliberately portrayed him as comfortable expressing behaviour outside conventional masculine expectations. He also noted Wrench's affection for Marcus Holloway and welcomed queer interpretations of the character by fans, while emphasizing that he did not regard their relationship as necessarily romantic.

Ubisoft formally revealed the expansion's storyline during Ubisoft Forward in June 2021, announcing that it would be set before the main campaign and centre on Aiden's attempt to steal the BrocaBridge before Wrench intervenes. The company also detailed the protagonists' separate abilities and announced Resistance Missions for Aiden and Fixer Contracts for Wrench.

Bloodline was released on July 6, 2021, for Windows, PlayStation 4, PlayStation 5, Xbox One, Xbox Series X/S, Stadia and Amazon Luna. It was included with the Legion Season Pass and sold separately for US$14.99; ownership of the Season Pass was required to use Aiden and Wrench as operatives throughout the main campaign and online mode.

Stephen Barton composed a separate score for the expansion. Ubisoft Music released the sixteen-track Watch Dogs: Legion – Bloodline (Original Game Soundtrack) on July 6, 2021; the album runs approximately 43 minutes.

A tie-in novel, Watch Dogs: Stars & Stripes, written by Sean Grigsby and Stewart Hotston, was published in 2022. Set shortly before Aiden's journey to London, it follows Aiden and Jordi during an investigation in the United States and serves as a narrative prequel to Bloodline.

== Reception ==
Reception

Aggregate scores
Aggregator	Score
Metacritic	PC: 73/100; PS4: 73/100; PS5: 70/100; XSX: 81/100
OpenCritic	54%

Review scores
Publication	Score
Game Informer	8.25/10
Push Square	7/10

According to Metacritic, Bloodline received "generally favorable" reviews, with aggregate scores ranging from 70 on PlayStation 5 to 81 on Xbox Series X. OpenCritic reported a "Top Critic Average" of 73 out of 100, with 54% of critics recommending the expansion. Much of the critical discussion centred on Ubisoft's decision to abandon Legion's procedurally generated protagonists in favour of Aiden and Wrench.

Liana Ruppert of Game Informer argued that Bloodline supplied the emotional connection she had found lacking in the base game. She praised the relationship between Aiden and Wrench, their contrasting abilities, Aiden's reconciliation with Jackson and what she considered satisfying closure for both protagonists. Ruppert concluded that its character growth made it more enjoyable to her than the main campaign of Legion. James Berich of Press Start similarly regarded the expansion as a corrective to the impersonal quality he had perceived in Legion. He considered Aiden substantially more sympathetic than in the original game and praised the narrative's willingness to have Jackson challenge his uncle over the consequences of his earlier actions. Berich also enjoyed the contrast between Aiden's darker combat style and Wrench's more colorful equipment, describing their opposing personalities as complementary.

Sammy Barker of Push Square considered Bloodline's protagonists responsible for a more focused and compelling story than the base game, praising their individualized abilities and the expansion's connections to the previous games. He nevertheless emphasized that the underlying mission structure remained largely unchanged and criticized the reuse of London's existing locations. Carli Velocci of Windows Central likewise described Bloodline as Ubisoft returning the series to its roots. She found Aiden's attempt to reconnect with Jackson a basic but effective redemption narrative and considered the expansion most successful when Wrench's eccentricity was placed against Aiden's stoicism. However, Velocci argued that eliminating the recruitment system and many of Legion's open-world activities made London feel smaller and the gameplay overly simplified, and she reported numerous technical problems.

Park also contrasted Bloodline with Legion's experimental protagonist system. He argued that scripted missions built around characters with established motivations allowed him to develop a stronger sense of London's individual neighborhoods and gave the player clearer reasons for participating in otherwise familiar open-world activities. He considered the approximately eight-hour length advantageous because its authored character interactions prevented the mission structure from becoming as repetitive as he found the base campaign. Other critics reached similar conclusions from different perspectives. Ruppert viewed the expansion primarily as an examination of how Aiden and Wrench had changed since their earlier appearances, arguing that Aiden's relationship with Jackson supplied a redemptive arc and emotional closure. Berich and Velocci both characterized the return to fixed protagonists as a form of course correction after Legion, while noting the irony that achieving a stronger character-driven story required Ubisoft to remove the mechanic that had most distinguished the base game.

Critics also commented positively on the production values. Berich praised Barton's electronic score for heightening combat and dramatic sequences, and regarded the scripted voice performances as an improvement over Legion's procedurally assembled cast, although he found Aiden's deliberately gravelly delivery occasionally tiresome. Gene Park of The Washington Post also reported graphical bugs and crashes on both Xbox Series X and Windows, observing that the expansion did not resolve all of the technical and pacing problems inherited from the base game.

Reviewing the expansion for WorthPlaying, Adam Pavlacka praised Wrench as an LGBTQ protagonist whose sexuality and failed relationship were treated as ordinary components of a broader characterization rather than made the defining focus of his story.

Reviewing the novel, Michael Blaker of Gameindustry.com described it as a direct narrative prequel to Bloodline and as a reintroduction to Aiden immediately before his return in the expansion.
