= List of fictional hackers =

This is a list of fictional hackers in comics, films, video games, and other media.

Hollywood films of the 1980s and 1990s portrayed hackers as technology wunderkinds who became "unintentional criminals." They were depicted as unconventional heroes fighting for justice, even though they were hunted by law enforcement for breaking IT laws.

== Comics and sequential art ==
=== Batman-related comics ===
- Lonnie Machin (Moneyspider): an anarchist vigilante, featured in Anarky and various Batman-related comics, published by DC Comics
- Tim Drake (Robin): the third Robin of the Batman Family, published by DC Comics
- Barbara Gordon (Oracle): a major character in various Batman-related comics and Birds of Prey
- Noah Kuttler (The Calculator): brilliant hacker villain in DC Comics
- Wendy Harris (Proxy)

=== The Hacker Files ===
- Jack Marshall (Hacker) – protagonist of The Hacker Files series
- Barbara Gordon (Oracle)
- Master Blaster
- Cowboy
- Sue Denim
- Phreaky Phreddy
- Spider

=== Ghost Rider 2099 ===
- Artificial Kidz:
  - Kenshiro "Zero" Cochrane (Ghost Rider)
  - Warewolf
  - Phrack
  - 2600
- Jimmy Alhazared (Doctor Neon)

== Literature ==
=== Anonymous by Jhala vs. Jhali ===
- Jhala (Strength)
- Jhali (Weekness)
- Anonymous

=== The Blue Nowhere (Jeffery Deaver novel) ===
- Wyatt Gillette (Valleyman)
- Phate (Jon Patrick Holloway)

=== The Chronicles of Amber by Roger Zelazny ===
- Merlin of Amber aka Merle Corey, the protagonist of the second series
- Rinaldo aka Lucas "Luke" Reynard, his best friend

=== Cryptonomicon ===
- Randy Waterhouse

=== Discworld ===
- The Smoking GNU (Mad Al, Sane Alex and Undecided Adrian) – (clacks hackers)
- Ponder Stibbons (clacks hacker, through Hex)

=== Drawing Blood ===
- Zach Bosch

=== Genius series (Catherine Jinks novels) ===
- Cadel English

=== The Girl with the Dragon Tattoo/Millennium series ===
- Lisbeth Salander (Wasp) – protagonist
- Other hackers appearing occasionally, known by nickname only:
  - Plague (Swedish)
  - Trinity (British)
  - Bob the Dog (British)
  - Bilbo (American in Texas)

=== Hex ===
- Raven – Hex, Hex: Shadows, Hex: Ghosts

=== Holo.Wars: The Black Hats ===
- Steve Cylander
- F8th
- Hauk
- Dark0

=== Jurassic Park ===
- Lex Murphy
- Dennis Nedry

=== Kidd series (John Sandford novels) ===
- Kidd
- Bobby

=== Little Brother (Cory Doctorow novel) ===
- W1n5t0n
- M1K3Y

=== Neuromancer ===
- Henry Dorsett Case

=== Oryx and Crake ===
- Crake

=== The Shockwave Rider ===
- Nick Haflinger

=== Snow Crash ===
- Da5id Meier
- Hiro Protagonist
- In the context of the plot, Enki is considered to be "the original hacker", capable of modifying the behavior of society
- Jaunita gains some of the skills attributed to Enki

=== Splinter Cell series ===
- Anna Grimsdóttír (Grim)
- Marcus Greenhorn

=== Tori Swyft thriller series (John M. Green novels) ===
- FIGJAM Thatcher in The Trusted and The Tao Deception
- Red Scorpion in The Tao Deception

== Film ==
=== Ace Ventura: Pet Detective ===
- Woodstock

=== Antitrust ===
- Milo Hoffman

=== Assassins ===
- Elektra

=== Bait ===
- Bristol

=== Blackhat ===
- Nicholas Hathaway
- Sadak

=== The Core ===
- Taz Finch ("Ratt")

=== Cowboy Bebop: The Movie ===
- Lee Sampson

=== Cube 2: Hypercube ===
- Alex Trusk

=== Die Hard ===
- Theo

=== Enemy of the State ===
- Edward Lyle (Brill)

=== Furious 7 ===
- Ramsey

=== Ghost in the Machine ===
- Karl Hochman

=== Ghost in the Shell: Stand Alone Complex ===
- The Laughing Man

=== GoldenEye ===
- Boris Grishenko

=== Gone in 60 Seconds ===
- Toby

=== Hackers ===
- Kate Libby ("Acid Burn")
- Ramόn Sánchez ("Phantom Phreak")
- Paul Cook ("Lord Nikon")
- Eugene Belford ("The Plague")
- Dade Murphy ("Zero Cool" a.k.a. "Crash Override")
- Joey Pardella
- Emmanuel Goldstein ("Cereal Killer")

=== Independence Day ===
- David Levinson (Alien OS hacker)

=== The Italian Job ===
- Lyle ("The Real Napster")

=== Johnny Mnemonic ===
- Jones (The Dolphin)
- Strike

=== Jumpin' Jack Flash ===
- Jack
- Terry Doolittle

=== The Lawnmower Man ===
- Jobe Smith

=== Live Free or Die Hard ===
- Matthew Farrell
- Thomas Gabriel
- Freddie ("Warlock")

=== The Losers ===
- Jake Jensen

=== The Matrix ===
- Apoc
- Cypher (Mr. Reagan)
- Dozer
- Ghost
- Morpheus
- Mouse
- Neo (Thomas A. Anderson)
- Switch
- Tank
- Trinity

=== Mission: Impossible ===
- Luther Stickell

=== National Treasure ===
- Riley Poole

=== The Net ===
- Angela Bennett ("Angel")
- Jack Devlin

=== Ocean's 8 ===
- Nine Ball

=== Ocean's Eleven ===
- Livingston Dell

=== Ocean's Thirteen ===
- Virgil Malloy

=== Office Space ===
- Michael Bolton
- Samir Nagheenanajad
- Peter Gibbons

=== Serenity ===
- Mr. Universe

=== Sneakers ===
- Martin Bishop
- Erwin Emery (Whistler)
- Darryl Roskow (Mother)

=== Superman III ===
- Gus Gorman

=== Swordfish ===
- Stanley Jobson
- Axel Torvalds

=== Terminator 2: Judgment Day ===
- John Connor

=== Trackers (Patrick Carman novel) ===
- Shantorian

=== Tron ===
- Kevin Flynn

=== WarGames ===
- David Lightman

=== Wreck-It Ralph ===
- King Candy (Turbo)

=== XXX: State of the Union ===
- Agent Toby Lee Shavers

== Television ==
=== 24 ===
- Chloe O'Brian

=== Agents of S.H.I.E.L.D. ===
- Daisy "Skye" Johnson

=== Alias ===
- Marshall Flinkman
- Rachel Gibson

=== Arrow ===
- Felicity Smoak

=== Batman Beyond ===
- Maxine Gibson

=== Battle Programmer Shirase ===
- Akira Shirase

=== Birds of Prey ===
- Barbara Gordon/Oracle

=== Blake's 7 ===
- Kerr Avon

=== Bloody Monday ===
- Takagi Fujimaru (Falcon)

=== Bones ===
- Christopher Pelant
- Angela Montenegro

=== Breaking In ===
- Bret Harrison

=== Buffy the Vampire Slayer ===
- Willow Rosenberg

=== Chuck ===
- Chuck Bartowski
- Stephen J. Bartowski

=== Code Lyoko ===
- Jeremie Belpois
- Aelita Schaeffer

=== Continuum ===
- Alec Sadler

=== Covert Affairs ===
- Auggie Anderson

=== Cowboy Bebop ===
- Ed (Radical Edward) – short for Edward Wong Hau Pepelu Tivrusky IV

=== Criminal Minds ===
- Penelope Garcia – Hacker handle: The Black Queen

=== Mistletoe Murders ===
- Chimera - Founded by Grace (Sarah Drew) and Aaron (Aaron Ashmore)

=== CSI: Cyber ===
- Brody Nelson
- Raven Ramirez
- Daniel Krumitz ("Krummy")

=== Dark Angel ===
- Logan Cale (Eyes Only)

=== Doctor Who ===
- The Doctor
- Adam Mitchell
- Clara Oswald / Oswin Oswald
- Mickey Smith
- Bob Salmon – Doctor Who Past Doctor Adventures novel Blue Box by Kate Orman
- Sarah Swan ("Fionnula") – Doctor Who Past Doctor Adventures novel Blue Box by Kate Orman

=== Earth: Final Conflict ===
- Marcus "Augur" Deveraux

=== Eden of the East ===
- Yutaka ("Pantsu") Itazu
- Juiz

=== Eureka (American TV series) ===
- Zane Donovan

=== The Flash (2014) ===
- Cisco Ramon

=== General Hospital ===
- Stan Johnson
- Damian Spinelli

=== Ghost in the Shell: Stand Alone Complex ===
- Aoi (Laughing Man)

=== Inspector Gadget ===
- Penny

=== Johnny Chase (T-Mobile commercials) ===
- Johnny Chase

=== Kim Possible ===
- Wade Load

=== Level 9 ===
- Roland Travis
- Margaret "Sosh" Perkins
- Jargon

=== Leverage ===
- Alec Hardison
- Colin Mason ('Chaos')

=== Lone Wolf McQuade ===
- Kayo Ramos

=== MacGyver ===
- Kate – (Episode: "Ugly Duckling")

=== Max Headroom ===
- Theora Jones
- Bryce Lynch

=== Mr. Robot ===
- Elliot Alderson ("Sam Sepiol")
- Darlene Alderson ("Dolores Haze")
- Shama Biswas ("Trenton")
- Sunil Markesh ("Mobley")
- Leslie Romero
- Cisco

=== NCIS ===
- Abby Sciuto
- Timothy McGee

=== Nikita ===
- Seymour Birkoff

=== Person of Interest ===
- Samantha Groves (Root)

=== The Raccoons ===
- Bentley Raccoon

=== ReBoot ===
- Mouse

=== Scandal ===
- Charlie
- Huck
- Jake Ballard
- Quinn Perkins

=== seaQuest DSV ===
- Lucas Wolenczak ("Frankenstein")
- Mark ("Wolfman")
- Martin Clemens ("Mycroft")

=== Simon & Simon ===
- Terry McDaniels (S1:E3 Trapdoors)

=== Serial Experiments Lain ===
- Lain Iwakura

=== Smallville ===
- Chloe Sullivan

=== Spider-Man: The Animated Series ===
- Hobgoblin

=== Team Knight Rider ===
- Kevin ("Trek") Sanders

=== Torchwood ===
- Esther Drummond
- Ianto Jones
- Jack Harkness
- Toshiko Sato

=== Undergrads ===
- Justin Taylor ("Gimpy")

=== Veronica Mars ===
- Cindy "Mac" Mackenzie

=== Warehouse 13 ===
- Claudia Donovan

=== Witch Hunter Robin ===
- Michael Lee

=== The X-Files ===
- Invisigoth ("Ester Nairn")
- The Lone Gunmen (also featured in The Lone Gunmen)
  - John Fitzgerald Byers
  - Melvin Frohike
  - Richard Langly

=== Z Nation ===
- Citizen Z
- Kaya in da Skya

== Video games ==
=== Apex Legends ===
- Crypto

=== Assassin's Creed II ===
- Rebecca Crane

=== Assassin's Creed: Unity ===
- Bishop

=== Command & Conquer: Generals ===
- Black Lotus

=== Cyberpunk 2077 ===
- Altiera "Alt" Cunningham
- Spider Murphy
- T-Bug
- Song So Mi ("Songbird")
- Wilky LaGuerre ("Slider")

=== Danganronpa: Trigger Happy Havoc ===
- Chihiro Fujisaki

=== Deus Ex: Human Revolution ===
- Frank Pritchard

=== Life is Strange ===
- Chloe Price

=== The Longest Journey ===
- Burns Flipper

=== Mega Man X ===
- Middy

=== Metal Gear Solid ===
- Dr. Hal Emmerich ("Otacon")

=== Metal Slug ===
- Marco Rossi

=== Mystic Messenger ===
- 707
- Vanderwood
- Unknown/Saeran/Ray

=== Hacker Evolution ===
- Brian Spencer

=== Hacknet ===
- Bitwise (Bit)
- Kaguya (From the DLC Labyrinths)
- Coel (From the DLC Labyrinths)
- D3F4ULT (From the DLC Labyrinths)
- CSEC (Hacking Group inside game.)
- The Kaguya Trials (DLC Hacker Group in the game)
- Striker (Rival on the DLC Labyrinths)
- Naix (Main Game Rival)

=== Honkai Impact 3rd and Honkai: Star Rail ===
- Bronya Zaychik

=== Hitman 3 ===
- Hush

=== Overwatch ===
- Sombra

=== Persona 5 ===
- Futaba Sakura

=== Saints Row: The Third ===
- Kinzie Kensington

=== Sly Cooper ===
- Bentley

=== System Shock ===
- The Hacker
- Dexter Witer

=== Team Fortress 2 ===
- Spy

=== Vampire: The Masquerade ===
- Mitnick – Vampire: The Masquerade - Bloodlines, based on real-life hacker Kevin Mitnick
- Dev/Null – Vampire: The Masquerade - Redemption

=== Watch Dogs and Watch Dogs 2 ===
- Aiden Pearce (The Vigilante/The Fox)
- JB Markowicz ("Defalt")
- Raymond Kenney ("T-Bone")
- Damien Brenks
- Clara Lille ("BadBoy17")
- Delford Wade ("Iraq")
- Marcus Holloway ("Retr0")
- Josh Sauchak ("Hawt Sauce")
- Reginald ("Wr3nch")
- Horatio Carlin
- Lenora Kastner
- Ducky Epstein ("G1gg1L3s")
- Prime_Eight - Antagonist hacker group within the second game
- DedSec – Primary hacker group within the series

== Role-playing games ==
=== Cyberpunk 2020 ===
- Altiera 'Alt' Cunningham
- Rache Bartmoss
- Spider Murphy

=== Shadowrun ===
- Fastjack
- Netcat

== Multi-media franchises ==
=== A Certain Magical Index ===
- Kazari Uiharu, aka The Goalkeeper

=== Cult of the Dead Cow ===
- Demonseed Elite – Cult of the Dead Cow's ezine (and many others) / Mage: The Ascension

=== Ghost in the Shell ===
- Project 2501, aka The Puppet Master
