= Noam Jenkins =

Canadian actor

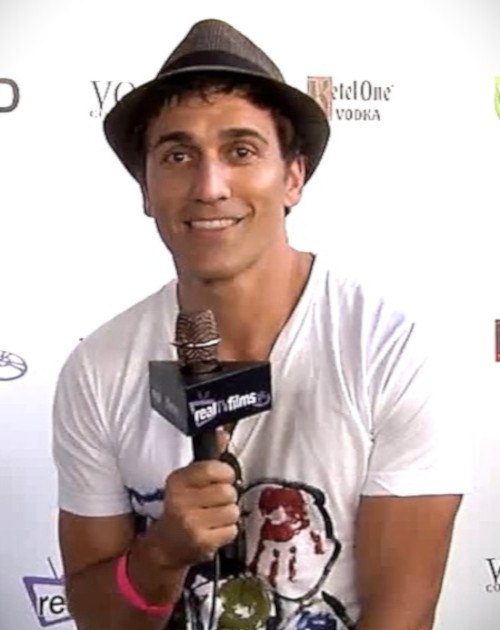
- Jenkins in 2011
- Born: Paris, France
- Occupation: Actor
- Years active: 1993–present

Noam Jenkins is a Canadian actor. He is best known for his portrayals as Jerry Barber on Global's Rookie Blue and Aiden Pearce in the 2014 video game Watch Dogs.

== Early life ==
Jenkins was born in Paris, France, to Canadian parents. He moved to Toronto with his parents when he was an infant.

== Career ==
Jenkins made his big break when he appeared as a minor character in the film Extreme Measures, starring Hugh Grant and Gene Hackman.

He then appeared as Evan in the 2005 television movie Category 7: The End of the World, starring Randy Quaid, Gina Gershon, Cameron Daddo, Robert Wagner, James Brolin and Swoosie Kurtz.

From 2010 to 2012, Jenkins portrayed the role of Detective Jerry Barber in the police drama series Rookie Blue, starring Missy Peregrym. From 2010 to 2013, he played the recurring character Vincent Rossabi in the crime drama television series Covert Affairs, starring Piper Perabo.

Jenkins voiced Aiden Pearce in the 2014 video game Watch Dogs. He reprised the role for Watch Dogs: Legion in 2021.

== Filmography ==
=== Film ===
Year	Production	Role	Notes
1993	Just for Fun	Carlos	Short film
1996	Extreme Measures	Criminal	
1997	Moving Target	Danny	
1998	54	Romeo	
1998	Jack and Jill		
1999	Two or Three Words	Flick	
2000	Washed Up	Jimmy	
2000	Gossip	Bartender	
2001	The Safety of Objects	Patrick Green	
2001	Century Hotel	Young Salvatore	
2002	WiseGirls	Garcia	
2002	John Q	Medicaid Official	
2002	Between Strangers	Rogelio	
2003	Luck	Robbie	
2003	The Statement	Michael Levy	
2004	Highwaymen	Kelt	
2004	Trouser Accidents	Gordon	Short film
2004	Childstar	Sydney Mehta	
2005	Saw II	Michael	
2007	Charlie Bartlett	Dean West	
2007	All Hat	Sonny Stanton	
2007	This Beautiful City	Harry	
2007	Saw IV	Michael	
2008	Transit Lounge	Dylan	Short film
2009	Walled In	Peter	
2009	Ruthie No. 1	Simon	Short film
2017	Bon Cop, Bad Cop 2	Sylvio DiPietro	

=== Television ===
Year	Title	Role	Notes
1993	Ghost Mom	Academic	Television film
1995	Forever Knight	Damir Petrashenko / Juri Karimov	Episode: "Beyond the Law"
1995	TekWar	Temple Austin	Episode: "Alter Ego"
1995	Nancy Drew	Storm Wilson	Episode: "Double Suspicion"
1995	Family of Cops	Gym Attendant	Television film
1996	Devil's Food	Waiter	Television film
1998	Highlander: The Raven	Joey Poletti	Episode: "Cloak & Dagger"
1999	Total Recall: The Series	Shelley	Episode: "Baby Lottery"
1999	The City	Lance	10 Episodes
1999–2001	Twice in a Lifetime	Hector Soto/Tony Rosetti	Episodes: "Quality of Mercy" & "Mama Mia"
2000	Thin Air	Woody Pontevecchio	Television film
2000	Relic Hunter	Adrian	Episode: "Gypsy Jigsaw"
2001	Queer as Folk	Guillaume	Episodes: "French Fried" & "Solution (How TLFKAM Got Her Name Back)"
2001	Walter and Henry	Museum Guard	Television film
2001	Earth: Final Conflict	Ryan Patrichio	7 episodes
2002	Adventure Inc.	Carlos Carmona	"Magic of the Rain Forest"
2002	Bury the Lead	Sam Lasky	1 Episode
2003	War Stories	Rainy Tamarov	Television film
2005	Kojak	Tommy Bale	Episode: "East Sixties" & "Fathers and Sons"
2005	Trump Unauthorized	Rod Robson	Television film
2005	Martha Behind Bars	Michael	Television film
2005	Category 7: The End of the World	Evan, White House Press Secretary	Television film
2006	The Path to 9/11	Marwan Al-Shehhi	Television film
2006	The House Next Door	Norman Greene	Television film
2006	The State Within	Christopher Styles	6 Episodes
2007	ReGenesis	Titus Muyerbridge	3 episodes
2007	Matters of Life & Dating		Television film
2008	Sold	Hal	Television film
2009	Flashpoint	Josh Scott	Episode: "Backwards Day"
2009	Being Erica	Adult Leo	Episode: "Leo"
2010	Who Is Clark Rockefeller?	Attorney	Television film
2010	Abroad	Samir Rahim	Television film
2010–2012	Rookie Blue	Detective Jerry Barber	35 episodes
2010–2013	Covert Affairs	Vincent Rossabi	6 Episodes
2011	Wandering Eye	Graham Ball	Television film
2011	Against the Wall	Tony Alexander	Episode: "Obsessed and Unwanted"
2013–2016	Longmire	Agent Towson	Episodes: "Unquiet Mind" & "Objection"
2013	An Amish Murder	John Tomasetti	Television Film
2014	The Listener	Curtis Raynard	Episode: "In Our Midst"
2014	Lost Girl	Heratio: an Ancient (a.k.a. Hera)	Recurring; season 5
2014	Reign	Gifford	Episode: "Three Queens"
2015	Mistresses	Luca Raines	7 episodes
2015	Full of Grace	Peter	Television film
2016	Designated Survivor	FBI Agent	Episode: "Pilot"
2017	Killjoys	Radek	Episode: "Attack the Rack"
2018	Good Witch	Wil Fuller	Episode: "Good Witch Spellbound"
2019	Hudson & Rex	Rick "Manny" Mannox	Episode: "Man of Consequence"
2019	Frankie Drake Mysteries	Kardec	Episode: "Things Left Better Dead"
2020	Sugar Daddy	Edward	Television film
2020	I Do, or Die: A Killer Arrangement	Ian Raeesi	Television film
2020–2021	Wynonna Earp	Amon	5 episodes
2021	The Republic of Sarah	William Whitmore	7 episodes
2022	The Hardy Boys	Steve Shaw	Episode: "The Missing Camera"
2023	Alert: Missing Persons Unit	Roger Garber	Episode: "Chloe"
2023	Rabbit Hole		3 episodes
2023	Reacher	Senator Lavoy	3 episodes
2024	Law & Order Toronto: Criminal Intent	Councillor John Graham	Episode: "Crack Reporter"

=== Video games ===
Year	Title	Role	Notes
2014	Watch Dogs	Aiden Pearce	Voice
2016	Watch Dogs 2	Aiden Pearce	Uncredited Cameo
2021	Watch Dogs: Legion	Aiden Pearce	Voice, DLC
2021	Far Cry 6	General Raul 'Old Dog' Sanchez	Voice
