= Watch Dogs =

Series of action-adventure games by Ubisoft

- Genre: Action-adventure
- Developers: Ubisoft Montreal; Ubisoft Toronto
- Publisher: Ubisoft
- Platforms: Microsoft Windows; PlayStation 3; PlayStation 4; PlayStation 5; Stadia; Xbox 360; Xbox One; Xbox Series X/S; Wii U
- First release: Watch Dogs; 27 May 2014
- Latest release: Watch Dogs: Legion; 29 October 2020

Watch Dogs (stylized as WATCH_DOGS) is an action-adventure video game franchise published by Ubisoft, and developed primarily by its Montreal and Toronto studios using the Disrupt game engine. The series' eponymous first title was released in 2014, which was followed by two sequels: Watch Dogs 2 (2016) and Watch Dogs: Legion (2020). The franchise also includes several tie-in novels, comic book miniseries, and an upcoming live-action film set in the games' fictional universe.

Gameplay in the Watch Dogs games focuses on an open world where the player can complete missions to progress an overall story, as well as engage in various side activities. The core gameplay consists of driving, shooting, and stealth segments, with occasional role-playing and puzzle elements. The Watch Dogs games are set in fictionalized versions of real-life cities, at various points in time, and follow different hacker protagonists who, while having different goals to achieve, find themselves involved with the criminal underworlds of their respective cities. The antagonists are usually corrupt companies, crime bosses, and rival hackers who take advantage of ctOS (central Operating System), a fictional computing network that connects every electronic device in a city together into a single system and stores personal information on most citizens. The player also has access to ctOS, which can be used to control various devices to assist them in combat, stealth, or solving puzzles.

The games have received generally positive reviews for their gameplay elements, mission structure, and world design, with criticism for frequent technical issues, while the narratives and characters have garnered mixed reactions. The series has been financially successful, with lifetime sales for the first two games exceeding 20 million units in total.

== Video games ==
Release timeline
2014	Watch Dogs
2014	Watch Dogs: Bad Blood
2015
2016	Watch Dogs 2
2017
2018
2019
2020	Watch Dogs: Legion
2021	Watch Dogs: Legion – Bloodline

=== Watch Dogs (2014) ===
Set within a fictionalized version of the Chicago metropolitan area in 2013, the first installment in the series follows gray hat hacker and vigilante Aiden Pearce's quest for revenge after the killing of his niece. The game's development began in 2009, with a budget of $68 million. Watch Dogs was derived from a potential sequel from the Driver series which had been in development at Ubisoft Montreal coincident to Driver: San Francisco at Ubisoft Reflections and was released in 2011. Driver: San Francisco did not have a strong commercial performance, leading to the Driver game at Montreal being reworked into one that focused on hacking but still incorporated driving elements. Ubisoft Montreal was Watch Dogs' lead developer, with additional support provided by Ubisoft Reflections, Ubisoft Paris, Ubisoft Quebec, and Ubisoft Bucharest. The game was heavily anticipated following its gameplay reveal at E3 2012, though the final game, which was accused of graphical downgrading, triggered controversy. The game was released for Windows, PlayStation 3, PlayStation 4, Xbox 360 and Xbox One in May 2014, and a Wii U version was released in November 2014.

Downloadable content (DLC) for the game, titled Watch Dogs: Bad Blood, was released in September 2014. Starring Raymond "T-Bone" Kenney, a major supporting character from the base game, as the playable protagonist, the DLC adds ten story missions, new "Street Sweep" contracts, as wells as new weapons, outfits, side missions, and an RC car.

=== Watch Dogs 2 (2016) ===
Set within a fictionalized version of the San Francisco Bay Area in 2016, Watch Dogs 2 follows the story of hacker Marcus Holloway, who is punished for a crime he did not commit through ctOS 2.0, and joins the hacking group DedSec in their efforts to raise social awareness about the dangers posed by ctOS 2.0. and expose the corruption of its creators, the Blume Corporation. This installment expanded upon the multiplayer options from the first game and introduced new weapons and gadgets. Unlike Watch Dogs, the game features a much more vibrant and optimistic tone. Ubisoft Montreal was the game's lead developer, with Ubisoft's studios in Toronto, Paris, Bucharest, Kyiv and Newcastle assisting the development. Watch Dogs 2 was released in November 2016 for Windows, PlayStation 4 and Xbox One.

Five downloadable content packs for the game have been released: the "T-Bone Content Bundle", "Human Conditions", "No Compromise", "Root Access Bundle", and "Psychedelic Pack". As per an exclusivity agreement with Sony Interactive Entertainment, all DLCs were timed exclusives for PlayStation 4, but in 2017 were made available for other platforms as well.

- Root Access Bundle (available in December 2016) and Psychedelic Pack (available on launch day) feature a Zodiac Killer mission as well as new outfits, cars, skins, and weapons.
- The T-Bone Content Bundle was released for PlayStation 4 on December 22, 2016, and includes a new co-op difficulty setting, "Mayhem", plus the clothes and truck of Raymond "T-Bone" Kenney.
- Human Conditions was released on February 21, 2017, for the PlayStation 4 and on March 23 for the Xbox One and PC, and includes three new stories set in San Francisco's science and medicine industries. The pack also includes new co-op missions featuring a new enemy class called "the Jammer", a technologically savvy enemy capable of jamming all of a player's hacker equipment, making them vulnerable to head-on attacks.
- No Compromise was released on April 18, 2017, for PlayStation 4 and was launched on May 18 for Xbox One and PC, featuring a new story mission, outfits and weapons.

=== Watch Dogs: Legion (2020) ===
Set within a fictionalised representation of a futuristic, dystopian London, Watch Dogs: Legion follows the local branch of DedSec as they seek to clear their names after being framed for a series of terrorist bombings. DedSec also attempt to liberate London's citizens from the control of Albion, an oppressive private military company which turned the city into a surveillance state following the bombings. The game introduces a multiple playable characters system, allowing players to recruit virtually any NPC found in the game's open world. Each playable character has their own unique skills and backgrounds, and can be lost permanently if players enable the option of permadeath before starting a new game. There are multiple ways to complete missions depending on which playable character is selected. Ubisoft Toronto led the game's development, with Clint Hocking serving as its creative director. Legion was released for Windows, PlayStation 4, Xbox One, and Stadia on October 29, 2020; PlayStation 5 and Xbox Series X/S versions were also made available once the consoles released.

The game's online multiplayer component, which was delayed from its planned December 3 release to March 2021, allows up to four players to complete exclusive cooperative missions, participate in various competitive game modes, or simply explore London together. Following its release, Legion was supported with several free updates that added new missions, game modes, and characters, including a number of special operatives, such as Mina Sidhu, a former test subject who has gained mind-control powers; Aiden Pearce, returning from the original Watch Dogs; Wrench, a major supporting character from Watch Dogs 2; and Darcy Clarkson, a member of the Assassin Brotherhood, as part of a non-canonical crossover with Ubisoft's Assassin's Creed franchise. A paid story expansion titled Watch Dogs: Legion – Bloodline, featuring Aiden and Wrench in a new storyline set after their respective games but before the events of Legion's main campaign, was released on July 6, 2021.

== Common elements ==
=== Gameplay ===
The Watch Dogs series is part of a genre known as sandbox games. The series combines elements of action, adventure, stealth and vehicular gameplay. The player can freely roam the virtual world on foot or by use of vehicles and make use of an array of weapon and melee-based combat. Illegal activities such as assaulting non-player characters (NPCs) will instigate a proactive and usually lethal response from authoritative figures. In the instance of death, the player will respawn near the area where they were killed.

In each game, the player assumes control of a hacker, who can hack into various electronic devices connected to the fictional ctOS system with their in-game smartphone. While most of the abilities granted by ctOS are useful for solving puzzles or in stealth sections, the player can make use of them at almost any given time during gameplay to create different scenarios, such as hacking into the traffic lights to create a traffic jam or calling the police on unsuspecting NPCs. In each game, the player can level up and unlock new hacker abilities and gadgets. In Watch Dogs 2, more weapons and hacker gadgets were introduced, such as a taser and a quadcopter.

=== Setting ===
The Watch Dogs games take place in fictionalized versions of real-life cities that have implemented ctOS. Watch Dogs is set in the Chicago area, Watch Dogs 2 in the San Francisco Bay Area, and Watch Dogs: Legion in Greater London. While the first two games take place during modern times, Legion is set in the "near future" (circa 2030), depicting significant advancements in technology.

== Reception ==
Aggregate review scores
Game	Metacritic
Watch Dogs	(PC) 77/100 (PS4) 80/100 (XONE) 78/100 (WIIU) 62/100
Watch Dogs 2	(PC) 75/100 (PS4) 82/100 (XONE) 81/100
Watch Dogs: Legion	(PC) 72/100 (PS4) 70/100 (PS5) 66/100 (XONE) 76/100 (XSX) 74/100

Watch Dogs received generally positive reviews despite criticism aimed at certain technical issues, the discrepancy in graphical quality between marketing and the real game, narrative, and protagonist. It sold more than 10 million copies by the end of 2014.

Watch Dogs 2 received generally positive reviews upon release, with critics generally regarding it as an improvement over the original game. While the game struggled at launch commercially, more than 10 million units were sold by 2020.

Watch Dogs: Legion received overall mixed reviews. Critics were polarized over the multiple playable characters aspect, with some appreciating its diversity and the inclusion of permadeath for allowing emotional attachment from players, while others criticized the characters' lack of personality and the imbalance between their abilities. Criticism was further aimed at the game's world, driving mechanics, inconsistent difficulty, repetitive missions, online features and technical problems.

== Other media ==
=== Literature ===
An eBook, Watch Dogs //n/Dark Clouds by John Shirley, which serves as a direct continuation of the first game, was released alongside it in 2014. A two-part comic book miniseries, Watch Dogs: Return to Rocinha, was published by Titan Comics in 2019 and follows Sauda, a young hacker from Brazil's slums who joins DedSec to fight against the local criminal underworld. A Watch Dogs: Legion prequel novel, titled Day Zero, and a companion book, titled Resistance Report, were published by Aconyte Book and Insight Editions, respectively, prior to the game's release. A spin-off comic book series was released monthly beginning in November 2021 by Behemoth in the United States and in two collected editions in France by Glénat. A prequel novel to the Watch Dogs: Legion – Bloodline expansion, titled Stars and Stripes, which follows Aiden Pearce and bridges the gap between the events of Watch Dogs and Legion, was published by Aconyte Books in April 2022.

=== Film adaptation ===
In 2013, it was rumored that a film adaptation of the first Watch Dogs game was in development by Ubisoft Film & Television, Sony Pictures Entertainment, and New Regency. In 2014, Paul Wernick and Rhett Reese were commissioned to write the film. In 2016, Engadget published an article stating that the film was still in development and that Ubisoft planned to make film renditions for all of its franchises. The film remained in development hell for over seven years, until 2024, when it was reported that Sophie Wilde was set to star in the film, with Mathieu Turi directing and Christie LeBlanc writing an original screenplay. In June, Tom Blyth joined Wilde. In July, Ubisoft announced that filming had officially begun.

=== Animated series ===
In 2019, it was reported that a Watch Dogs-inspired "cybermystery" animated television series was in development. Unlike the video games, which are rated M, the series would be aimed at tweens and would follow a teenage “super hacker” protagonist who solves crimes in her high school.

=== Audio drama ===
An interactive audio drama, Watch Dogs: Truth, was released in November 2024. It is set after the events of Watch Dogs: Legion.
