= Marcus Holloway =

Protagonist of Watch Dogs 2

- Watch Dogs character
- Marcus Holloway from Watch Dogs 2
- First game: Watch Dogs 2 (2016)
- Created by: Ubisoft
- Voiced by: Ruffin Prentiss (games); Marcus Ebulue (Captain Laserhawk: A Blood Dragon Remix)

In-universe information
- Origin: Oakland, California, United States
- Nationality: American

Marcus Holloway is a fictional character from Ubisoft's Watch Dogs video game franchise, first appearing as the player character of the 2016 title, Watch Dogs 2. Marcus is introduced as a young hacker (known online by the alias "Retr0") based in the San Francisco Bay Area who is wrongfully flagged with a criminal profile by ctOS 2.0, the electronic mechanism employed to manage the region's infrastructure and surveillance network. Marcus succeeds in wiping his profile from the system, and joins the hacktivist collective DedSec to raise social awareness about the risks posed by ctOS 2.0 and expose the corruption of its creators, the Blume Corporation. An older Marcus makes a voice-only cameo appearance in Bloodline, a 2021 downloadable content (DLC) expansion for Watch Dogs: Legion, which stars his best friend and fellow DedSec member Reginald "Wrench" Blechman, and in which Marcus is voiced by Ruffin Prentiss. The character returns in the animated series Captain Laserhawk: A Blood Dragon Remix, voiced by Mark Ebulue.

Marcus was first revealed along with Watch Dogs 2 in June 2016 by Ubisoft. He was intentionally designed to be very different in terms of personality and gameplay utility when compared to Aiden Pearce, the player character of the first Watch Dogs. The developers of Watch Dogs 2 encouraged collaboration with African American professionals within the entertainment industry to avoid turning characters like Marcus into caricatures. In keeping with the general shift in tone of Watch Dogs and expansion of its protagonist's abilities, the developers suggested that Marcus' intended playstyle mostly involve stunning enemies using nonlethal weaponry or using hacking skills to create distractions. Marcus has been the subject of generally positive reception following the release of Watch Dogs 2, with many critics recognizing the character's importance as an unusual representation of African Americans in popular media as well as black people in the video game medium as a whole.

== Concept and design ==
Marcus Holloway was first revealed during the Watch Dogs 2 world premiere video uploaded on Ubisoft's official YouTube channel in June 2016. He is designed to be an athletic player character. His approach to navigate the game world of Watch Dogs 2 emphasizes fast-paced parkour maneuvers similar to other video games like Mirror's Edge. Marcus' gadgets, which help extend his ability to hack electronics, include a tiny remote control car which can conduct physical hacks and divert enemies with high-pitched insults, and a drone which scout from an elevated position and help plan his moves. Marcus could also using his hacking skills to create proximity triggers on electronics and place traps for his enemies.

Although Marcus is presented as an antihero hacker like the protagonist of the first Watch Dogs, Aiden Pearce, he is designed to be more expressive and charismatic by contrast. According to Watch Dogs 2 producer Dominic Guay, Marcus is "an optimistic man. He needs people. He sees good things in people, he's young, he's funny, he's charming". Marcus goes by the handle Retr0 due to his appreciation for the nostalgic aspects of popular culture, such as old-school hacker culture and "classic" songs from the R&B, hip hop, and electronic music genres. Marcus' background is conceptualized as an individual who is raised in Oakland, California. This became crucial to the story as the character is likely to have experienced social injustice early in his life as a member of a marginalized community, which informs the character's motivations throughout the story.

Unlike the first Watch Dogs, it is possible to play the entirety of Watch Dogs 2 as Marcus without killing any enemies, which Guay explained is informed by the game's setting and lighthearted tone. Most of Marcus' abilities result in his enemies being rendered unconscious on the floor with little "z"s floating from their bodies for a time in the aftermath. Marcus takes down enemies within melee range in a brutal but non-lethal manner using the "Thunder Ball", a makeshift weapon made from a billiard ball strung on a chain. The developers' desire to balance player agency with the coherence of the narrative meant that there are certain decisions the character would and would not make, and that there are no cinematics or predetermined moments in the game where Marcus shoots or kills a non-player character as it would be inconsistent with his personality. Although players may equip Marcus with conventional firearm weapons, electroshock weaponry could be acquired through 3D printers in DedSec hideouts or "hackerspaces" However, the game only featured two non-lethal weapons at launch until a major content update released in April 2017 offered more nonlethal options for players.

=== Portrayal ===
Marcus Holloway is portrayed by Ruffin Prentiss through performance capture in Watch Dogs 2. The developers noted that they had a responsibility to ensure Marcus resonates with players as an authentic character as opposed to being a caricature. To accomplish this, Ubisoft actively sought out African-American script consultants and actors for their involvement with finding the characters' voices and encouraged improvised dialogue to make them feel real. Watch Dogs 2 Creative Director Jonathan Morin said the team encouraged the actors to embrace the natural synergy that spontaneously happens during their interactions with each other, noting in particular that the actors who played Marcus and another African American character named Horatio Carlin had a natural way of saying things to each other due to their similar cultural backgrounds.

Prentiss said his work experience on the game was positive: in an interview with IGN in October 2020, he praised the game's developers for the opportunity to "play a character in a video game that was brave enough to tackle such tough topics" as well as their willingness to not only explore issues of racism, but also give him creative freedom to interpret certain scenes from his perspective as a black man. Prentiss also acknowledged the positive fan reception to the close friendship between Marcus and a fellow DedSec team member named Wrench, which had been likened to a "bromance". According to Prentiss, the writing team for Watch Dogs 2 had considered the idea of implementing crossover storylines featuring characters from other titles like Marcus in an Avengers-like coalition for future work in the Watch Dogs series. Prentiss did not hear from Ubisoft before or shortly after the announcement of the then-upcoming Bloodline DLC for Watch Dogs: Legion even though Wrench was confirmed to appear, although he did express an interest about reprising the role as it is one of his favorite roles. Prentiss was eventually contacted by Ubisoft late in the development of Bloodline to provide several voiced lines, which he was happy to oblige.

== Appearances ==
=== Watch Dogs 2 ===
The story of Watch Dogs 2 begins with Marcus infiltrating a ctOS 2.0 server facility owned by Blume, a security company that operates a surveillance network spying on the populace of the San Francisco Bay Area and stores their personal information on a cluster of servers. His actions are remotely observed by the hacktivist collective DedSec, which Marcus intends to join due to their common dislike of ctOS 2.0 and Blume. Marcus hacks into the relevant server and removes incriminating information which is wrongfully placed on his data profile, then flees the facility with the help of DedSec members, who accept him into the collective. Together with his newfound team members, they celebrate his successful infiltration on a beach near the Golden Gate Bridge, where they unknowingly cross paths with Blume chief technology officer (CTO) Dušan Nemec by chance.

Over the course of the game, Marcus helps DedSec neutralize various threats around San Francisco, as part of their larger goal to bring down Blume by exposing its corruption and other crimes. In retaliation, Dušan executes automated social media accounts or bots to artificially inflate the popularity of DedSec's presence on social media, and exploits paranoia over the perceived security threat posed by DedSec as leverage to promote the widespread adoption of ctOS 2.0 to deter hacking attacks. Marcus is soon lured to the Blume CEO's office, where he is confronted by Dušan and narrowly escapes an ambush set up by him in collaboration with the police. Marcus regroups with the core group members of DedSec, gains an ally in the notorious hacker Raymond "T-Bone" Kenney, and soon rises to a leadership position within the collective as they attempt to fight the undue influence of Blume and its allies throughout the Bay Area. Dušan eventually succeeds in having Marcus placed on the FBI's most wanted list, but DedSec retaliates by publicly exposing Dušan's illegal dealings retrieved from the ctOS 2.0 network, leading to the latter's arrest and Blume being placed under investigation by the authorities.

=== Watch Dogs: Legion ===
Marcus plays a supporting role in Wrench's story arc in Bloodline, a downloadable content expansion for the 2020 title, Watch Dogs: Legion, released in July 2021. He makes several cameo voice appearances throughout the expansion. As both Legion and Bloodline are set well over a decade after the events of Watch Dogs 2, Marcus and Wrench are significantly older, and the latter has moved away from San Francisco, but maintained his friendship with Marcus and other DedSec members.

=== In other media ===
An alternate version of Marcus appears as a central character in the 2023 adult animated series Captain Laserhawk: A Blood Dragon Remix. In the series, DedSec, led by Marcus, work to undermine the megacorporation Eden, which has taken control of the United States. While helping Sam Fisher and his daughter Sarah flee the country, Sarah reports DedSec's location to the authorities, and they are captured and imprisoned in a virtual reality reconditioning facility. Decades later, Sam frees Marcus, and he becomes a prominent anti-Eden revolutionary, operating from a stronghold in the New Wasteland district.

== Critical reception ==
Marcus has received a generally positive reception from video game critics. In a preview article about Watch Dogs 2 written for PCGamesN, Kirk McKeand liked that Marcus has more imaginative and varied tastes in music and fashion, exhibits a wider range of emotions, and better gadgets compared to Aiden Pearce. Both IGN's Dan Stapleton and Joe Skrebels liked Marcus as a video game protagonist; Skrebels in particular thought Marcus "felt notably like a person, not just a collection of voice lines designed to string missions together". Paste staff and Alex Perry from Mic ranked Marcus Holloway among the best new video game characters of 2016; Perry praised his fun personality, sense of style, and thoughtfulness in his conversations with others, whereas Cameron Kunzelman from Paste complimented the development team of Watch Dogs 2 for their understanding that "a character needs to have character and not just be a cipher for whatever shooting and hollering the mechanics dictate". Polygon ranked Marcus Holloway among the best video game characters of the 2010s, with Jeff Ramos praising Marcus as a "more engaging and relatable protagonist" whose leadership role serves as a "rallying point who inspires and enables others to fight back" against systematic oppression. George Foster claimed that he is the Watch Dogs franchise's best character, and expressed displeasure in an editorial published by TheGamer that Marcus was seemingly left out of the then-upcoming Bloodline DLC for Legion. Foster further criticized the procedurally generated player character approach adopted by Legion in lieu of a clearly defined character like Marcus and that it ended up being an inferior game in his opinion.

Several critics have positively assessed Marcus within the context of how black representation is handled by developers in the history of the video game medium. In an article published by Paste, Jeremy Winslow was pleased that Marcus is portrayed as a compelling character with a multifaceted, rounded personality. Winslow argued that Marcus' overall depiction in Watch Dogs 2 disrupts the typical norms and stereotypes surrounding the vast majority of black video game characters with disadvantaged socio-economic backgrounds, particularly with his atypical visual design and reliance on intellect as opposed to physical brawn. Skrebels agreed that Marcus' story is groundbreaking in how it presents a narrative about a black man's experiences without relying on cliches. Writing for Polygon, Tanya DePass said she was impressed by a scene where Marcus interacts with Horatio Carlin, another core DedSec group member who is also African American, while on a visit to the latter's workplace, a prestigious company in the information technology industry located within Silicon Valley. She believed that their conversations are an authentic depiction of code-switching between standard American English and African-American Vernacular English among members of the African American community. Citing DePass' opinion on the scene, David J. Leonard agreed that the scene's boldness in challenging existing stereotypes of African Americans and vocalizing the daily realities of racism is not only disruptive but a source of pleasure. Leonard further argued that its importance extends beyond its edifying and truth-telling conversation about racism and the lack of diversity within workplaces in Silicon Valley, and that it also connects the racial injustice perpetuated by Silicon Valley throughout society to the hegemony of white masculinity. Perry agree that the scene stood out amidst the generally good standard of writing for Watch Dogs 2.

Not all reception towards Marcus' depiction in Watch Dogs 2 have been positive. Vice Waypoint staff commended the game's early attempts to engage with questions of identity and marginalization through Marcus and Horatio's interactions, but were left disappointed when Horatio is found murdered by a local street gang midway through the game's narrative. They felt that Marcus' drive for revenge in response to Horatio's murder compromised the character's integrity, and that Horatio is treated as an expendable afterthought since the game made no further attempts to commemorate his significance to Marcus and the rest of the team once the specific questline has concluded. Some reviewers also questioned the ludonarrative dissonance surrounding the potential in-game use of lethal firearms by Marcus. Wesley Yin-Poole from Eurogamer said it felt "off" to him that he could make the "likeable Marcus Holloway shoot to kill", a sentiment also shared by Stapleton who described the "weird disconnect" as feeling different than roleplaying as a violent criminal like the player characters of Grand Theft Auto V. Stapleton observed that Marcus' personality is the only motivating factor that pushes players toward a non-lethal playstyle of stealth and silent takedowns, as it may become impractical during intense combat situations. Phillip Kollar from Polygon criticized the ease of access to firearms in the first place as "a complete failure of imagination" on the part of the game's developers.
