= Clint Hocking =

Canadian video game designer and director (born 1972)

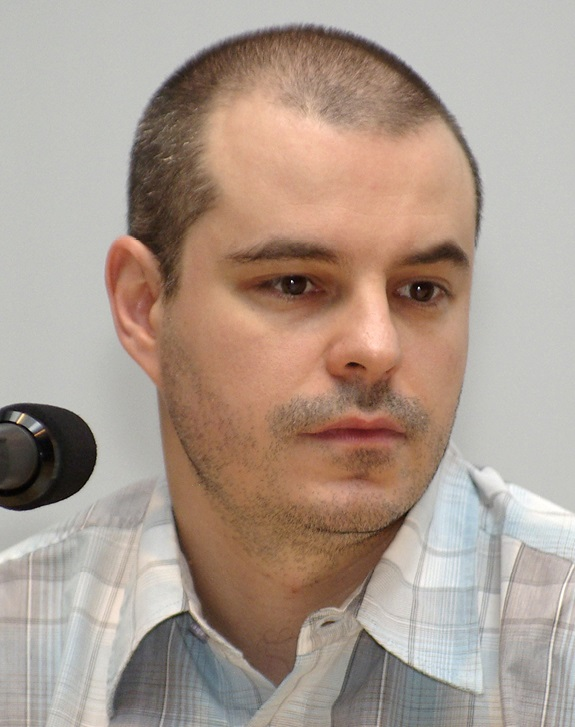
- Hocking in 2007
- Born: 18 September 1972 (age 54)
- Education: University of British Columbia (MFA)
- Occupations: Video game designer; Video game director
- Years active: 2001–present
- Employers: Ubisoft Montreal (2001–2010; 2021–2026); LucasArts (2010–2012); Valve (2012–2014); Amazon Game Studios (2014–2015); Ubisoft Toronto (2015–2020/2021)
- Known for: Coined ludonarrative dissonance
- Works: Tom Clancy's Splinter Cell (2002); Tom Clancy's Splinter Cell: Chaos Theory (2005); Far Cry 2 (2008); Watch Dogs: Legion (2020)
- Children: 1
- Website: clicknothing.com

Clint Hocking (born 18 September 1972) is a Canadian video game designer and director. He has primarily worked at the Canadian divisions of Ubisoft, where he developed three titles, and briefly worked at LucasArts, Valve, and Amazon Game Studios.

Hocking started his career at Ubisoft, where he first designed and wrote scripts for 2002's Tom Clancy's Splinter Cell. He rose to prominence when he moved up to direct 2005's Tom Clancy's Splinter Cell: Chaos Theory, which was both a critical and commercial success. He went on direct 2008's Far Cry 2, which was positively received by critics. In 2010, he left Ubisoft Montreal due to him being "too comfortable" at the studio. Between 2010 and 2015, Hocking joined LucasArts, Valve, and Amazon Game Studios in various senior roles. Throughout this period, he did not release any new games and in August 2015 returned to Ubisoft, this time at their Toronto studio. At this studio, he directed Watch Dogs: Legion (2020) which received mixed reception from critics. By July 2021, he returned to Montreal studio and is due to direct Assassin's Creed: Codename Hexe and co-direct the Assassin's Creed Infinity game platform with Jonathan Dumont, but left in 2026. Across his career, Hocking has written monthly columns for the video game magazine Edge. He coined the term ludonarrative dissonance in 2007.

== Early life ==
Hocking was born on 18 September 1972 and is from Montreal, Canada.

== Career ==
Hocking started his career as a writer for website companies whilst completing his Master of Fine Arts in creative writing at the University of British Columbia in Vancouver. During this time, he was experimenting with the level editor UnreadlEd, which he used to make a mod and complete a game level. With this experience, he sent his résumé in as "a lark" to Ubisoft Montreal and was subsequently hired as a level designer on 2002's Tom Clancy's Splinter Cell. During development, both the scriptwriter and game designer left the project and Hocking took on both roles, in addition to being a level designer. Upon release, Tom Clancy's Splinter Cell was well-received by critics, receiving "universal acclaim" according to review aggregator Metacritic.

After the release of Tom Clancy's Splinter Cell, Ubisoft Montreal began development for 2005's Tom Clancy's Splinter Cell: Chaos Theory and Hocking continued as the scriptwriter as well as the lead level designer. In the alpha stage of development, Hocking initially declined the creative director role due to having two positions already, but he changed his mind a week later. During the game's two-year development, Hocking was working 80 hours a week. This large workload caused him to have gaps in his recent memory, such as completely forgetting a week he spent socialising with a former colleague due to brain damage. Upon release, Tom Clancy's Splinter Cell: Chaos Theory was universally acclaimed by critics and was a commercial success. Soon after, development of 2008's Far Cry 2, a first-person shooter featuring an open world environment set in a fictional African country, started with Hocking as the creative director and scriptwriter. Upon release, Far Cry 2 was positively received by critics. Hocking and critics noted some of its reception was polarizing, which he attributed to the game breaking many conventions of the shooter and open world genre. Some gameplay elements, which immersed the player, critics found polarizing. This included features such as firearm jamming and degradation, a map being a crumpled piece of paper in the player character's hands as opposed to one found within a menu, and malaria which the player character contracts and must be managed throughout the game.

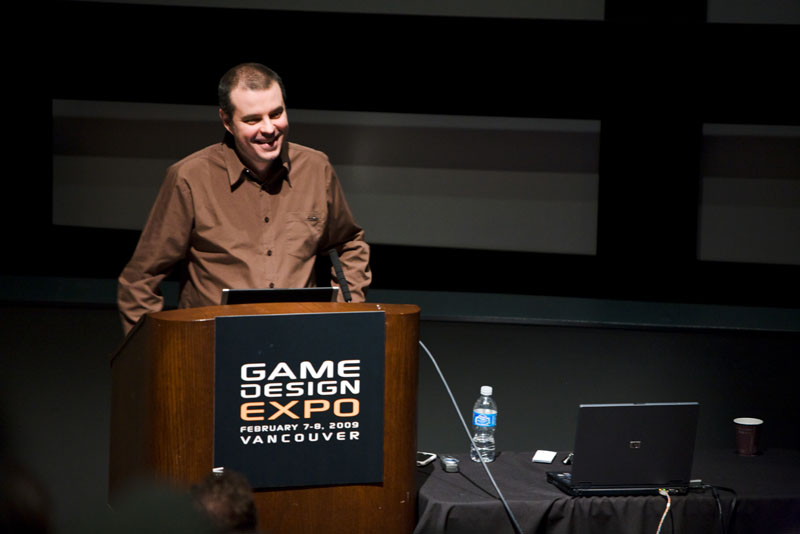
Hocking delivering a keynote at Game Design Expo 2009

In May 2010, after almost nine years at Ubisoft Montreal, Hocking left because he felt he had become "too comfortable" at the studio and wanted a new challenge.

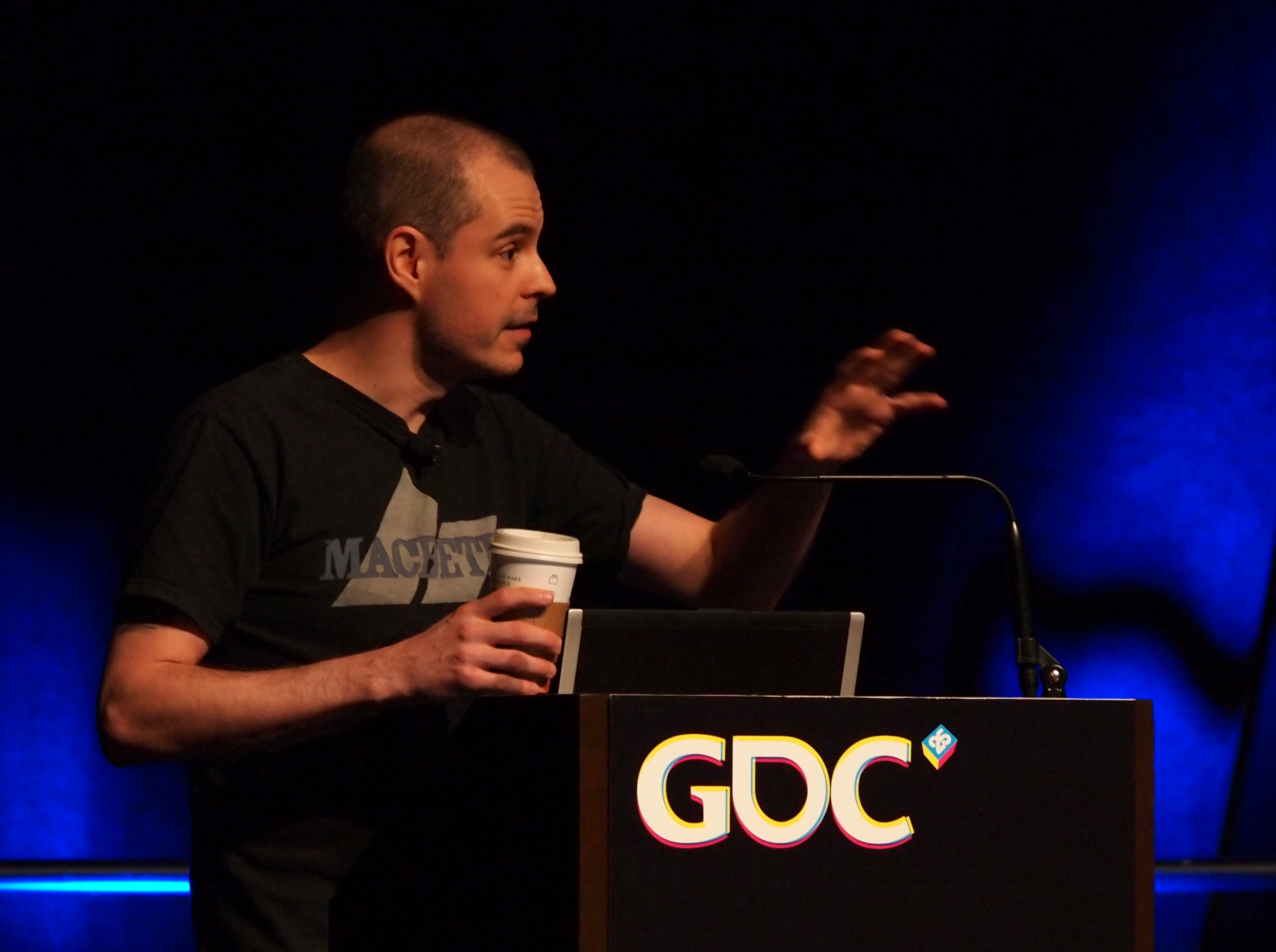
Hocking at Game Developers Conference 2011

Three months later, Hocking joined LucasArts, based in San Francisco, as the creative director on an unannounced project. In June 2012, Hocking left LucasArts without releasing a new game. He stated he wanted to move "on to something new"; It is not known what projects he was working whilst at LucasArts. Two weeks later, Hocking joined Valve in Seattle, Washington in an unspecified role. In January 2014, Hocking left Valve without releasing a game.

In April of the same year, joined Amazon Game Studios, also based in Seattle. Hocking worked as a senior game designer an unspecified project for Amazon's Fire devices. In August 2015, he left Amazon Game Studios. Hocking said he enjoyed working with new people but wanted to work on something that people will get to play, having realized that he has not shipped a game in seven years. Hocking also expressed difficulties in obtaining a green card and being on his third visa whilst in the United States, which was another reason he wanted to return to Canada. A few days later, he returned to Ubisoft, this time at their Toronto studio, saying it felt like a reunion. He was excited to return to Ubisoft, and he stated: "I know most of the people who were involved in founding the studio personally, and almost all of them are still here". Hocking's first project at the studio was as creative director for Watch Dogs: Legion, a game that was announced at E3 2019. Hocking noted that most of the developers who worked on Watch Dogs (2014) and Watch Dogs 2 (2016) were part of his team when he directed Far Cry 2. Legion was released in October 2020 and received mixed reviews from critics.

By July 2021, he returned to Ubisoft Montreal. Hocking, alongside Jonathan Dumont, will serve as Assassin's Creed Infinity's (Codename Hexe) creative directors with Dumont and Hocking leading the Ubisoft Quebec and Montreal divisions, respectively. Hocking left the studio in February 2026 as a result of company restructuring; the game's development will continue under Jean Guesdon, the new creative director.

In May, he founded Build Machine Games, a new independent video game developer, to create games that are "emotionally resonant [and] socially relevant" in Canada.

Across his career, Hocking has written monthly columns for the video game magazine Edge. Additionally, he was a part of an Advisory Committee with industry veterans Raph Koster, Ray Muzyka, Ryan Lesser, and Brian Reynolds to pick Special Award winners at Game Developers Choice Awards 2008.

=== Ludonarrative dissonance ===
In a 2007 blog post, Hocking coined the term ludonarrative dissonance, which he defined as the perceived conflict between a video game's narrative told through the story and the narrative told through the gameplay. Ludonarrative, a portmanteau of ludology and narrative, refers to the intersection in a video game of ludic elements (gameplay) and narrative elements. In the post, he critiqued BioShock (2007), feeling that while the narrative wants the protagonist to be selfless, the actual mechanics of BioShock rely on selfishness and the pursuit of power.

== Personal life ==
Hocking has a wife and one son. He identifies as a socialist.

== Works ==
=== Video games ===
Year	Game title	Role(s)	Notes	Ref(s).
2002	Tom Clancy's Splinter Cell	Game designer, scriptwriter, level designer	—N/a	
2005	Tom Clancy's Splinter Cell: Chaos Theory	Creative director, scriptwriter, lead level designer	—N/a	
2008	Far Cry 2	Creative director, scriptwriter	—N/a	
2020	Watch Dogs: Legion	Creative director	—N/a	

=== Films and television ===
Year	Title	Role	Notes	Ref.
2011	Gamers Heart Japan	Himself	Documentary	
