= Aiden Pearce =

- Watch Dogs character
- Aiden Pearce from Watch Dogs
- First appearance: Watch Dogs (2014)
- Last appearance: Watch Dogs: Stars and Stripes (2022)
- Created by: Ubisoft Montreal
- Voiced by: Noam Jenkins

In-universe information
- Aliases: The Fox; The Vigilante; Joe Smith; Nicholas Crispin
- Origin: Belfast, Northern Ireland, United Kingdom
- Nationality: Irish-American

Aiden Pearce (also known as The Vigilante and The Fox) is a fictional character in the Watch Dogs video game series developed by Ubisoft. He first appeared as the main protagonist of the original Watch Dogs (2014), in which he was portrayed by Noam Jenkins via performance capture. He also made a minor, non-speaking appearance in Watch Dogs 2 (2016), and returned as a playable character in Watch Dogs: Legion (2020), with Jenkins reprising his role. In Legion, Aiden serves as one of the two protagonists of the Bloodline expansion, alongside Wrench from Watch Dogs 2. The character has also appeared in media outside the games, such as the novels Watch Dogs //n/Dark Clouds (2014) by John Shirley, and Watch Dogs: Stars and Stripes (2022) by Sean Grigsby and Stewart Hotston.

In the franchise, Aiden is portrayed as a highly skilled grey hat hacker and vigilante based in Chicago, who utilizes the fictional ctOS system to manipulate the city's infrastructure and security features. After an attempt on his life results in the death of his young niece, Aiden embarks on a quest for revenge against those responsible, while slowly attempting to move on from his trauma. In Legion, which takes place nearly two decades after the events of Watch Dogs, Aiden relocates to London, where he tries to reconnect with his estranged nephew and becomes involved with the local hacking syndicate DedSec, which seeks to liberate the city from the control of an oppressive private military company.

Aiden was first revealed by Ubisoft at the E3 2012 conference in a demo trailer. According to director Jonathan Morin, Breaking Bad's main protagonist Walter White was a direct source of inspiration for Aiden, as they were both intentionally designed to be flawed antiheroes. Aiden's character has received a generally mixed reception, with many reviewers criticizing his perceived unlikability and lack of growth, although his appearance in the Bloodline expansion for Legion was met with more positive responses.

== Appearances ==
=== Watch Dogs ===
Aiden Pearce first appears as the protagonist of the original Watch Dogs game. His backstory establishes that he was born on 2 May 1974 in Belfast, Northern Ireland. At an unspecified point in time, he, along with his mother and younger sister Nicole Pearce, emigrated from Belfast to Chicago, where it is implied that his father was a criminal and an abusive parent. According to Aiden, he grew up in a rough neighborhood, where he was often engaged in violence and joined a gang, learning how to fight and use weapons. He later became proficient with computers and a skilled grey hat hacker, utilising Chicago's ctOS network to manipulate the city's infrastructure and security features. Operating as a fixer and thief, Aiden at some point met and befriended fellow hacker Damien Brenks, and the two formed a partnership.

In 2012, Aiden and Damien conduct a heist on the Merlaut Hotel, owned by Irish mob boss Dermont Quinn, in which they hack in and siphon money from people's bank accounts. However, Aiden abruptly ends the heist when he inadvertently triggers a silent alarm set by another hacker, giving himself and Damien away. On 26 October 2012, while Aiden is driving with his nephew Jackson and niece Lena to Pawnee, Illinois, Maurice Vega, a hitman hired by Quinn, shoots their car's tires, causing them to crash. While Aiden and Jackson survive, Lena dies in the crash, leading Aiden to vow revenge on those responsible.

A year later, Aiden tracks down and interrogates Vega, but is unsuccessful in learning the identity of his contractor. Leaving Vega in the hands of his partner, hired fixer Jordi Chin, Aiden goes to visit Nicole and Jackson for the latter's birthday. Having grown apart from his relatives due to the tragedy of Lena's death and his obsession with tracking down the perpetrators, Aiden makes an attempt to reconnect with Nicole and Jackson, only to learn that someone has been harassing them. With the help of Clara Lille, a member of the hacking syndicate DedSec, Aiden discovers the harasser was hired by Damien, who sought to gain his attention so that Aiden would help him find the other hacker from the failed Merlaut job. When Aiden refuses, Damien kidnaps Nicole to force him to comply.

After setting up a new hideout, Aiden works with Clara to track down the hacker, leading them to gang leader and Army veteran Delford "Iraq" Wade. Following a failed first attempt to breach Iraq's servers by blackmailing his cousin Tyrone "Bedbug" Hayes, Aiden nonetheless manages to obtain a data sample revealing that Iraq has information on almost every citizen of Chicago, which allows him to protect his gang from the authorities. As the recovered data is encrypted beyond Aiden and Clara's abilities, the pair decide to track down legendary hacker and former Blume whistleblower Raymond "T-Bone" Kenney. Aiden finds Kenney and erases his identity from ctOS to allow him to return to Chicago, before protecting him from Blume's private security forces, who were tipped off to Kenney's location by Damien in exchange for full access to ctOS. Upon returning to Chicago, Aiden assaults Iraq's compound to finish downloading its server data, and kills Iraq when the latter confronts him.

Aiden, Kenney, and Clara are unable to decrypt Iraq's data because another hacker, JB "Defalt" Markowicz, infiltrates their system and steals it. Defalt also reveals that Clara was hired to track down Aiden after the Merlaut job, therefore being indirectly responsible for Lena's death. Aiden angrily dimsisses Clara, and sets up a meeting with Damien, who demands the data he recovered from Iraq. When Aiden lies about being in possession of the data, Damien calls his bluff and exposes his identity to the authorities. After retrieving the stolen data from Defalt, Aiden track down Nicole with Kenney's help and rescues her, then bids her and Jackson farewell as the two leave Chicago for their safety.

After Kenney finishes decrypting the data, he informs Aiden of Quinn ordering the hit on him. Aiden confronts Quinn, who reveals he ordered the hit because he believed Aiden was searching for secret video footage that Quinn had been using to blackmail Mayor Donovan Rushmore. After killing Quinn, Aiden learns that he sent hitmen to eliminate Clara for being a liability. Unable to save Clara, Aiden decides to make the blackmail material public, leading an enraged Damien, who hoped to use it for his own gain, to wreak havoc in Chicago with ctOS. Aiden shuts down the system using a virus created by Kenney, after rejecting an offer from DedSec to grant them access to ctOS and allow them to watch over Chicago. He then confronts and kills Damien, and incapacitates Jordi, who was hired to eliminate both Aiden and Damien. In the epilogue, Aiden reflects on his role as Chicago's protector and confronts Vega one final time, deciding his fate.

Aiden makes a minor, voice-only appearance in the Bad Blood expansion, set after the events of the base game. In a side-mission, Kenney discovers that Blume has placed a $100,000 bounty on Aiden. Upon investigation, he learns that a whistleblower revealed to Blume that Aiden was using the Bunker as his hideout. Shortly afterwards, Blume hires bounty hunters to track down and kill Aiden. Kenney eliminates them and calls Aiden to warn him about the bounty on his head, preventing Blume from tracking him down.

=== Watch Dogs 2 ===
Aiden makes a non-speaking cameo appearance in Watch Dogs 2. In a side mission, the protagonist Marcus Holloway discovers that Aiden, who has since relocated to San Francisco, was investigating a human trafficking ring run by the Auntie Shu Boys and the Bratva, only to be captured by the latter. After locating the bunker where Aiden is being held, Marcus distracts the guard who seized Aiden's equipment, allowing him to retrieve it and escape from his cell.

=== Watch Dogs: Legion ===
Aiden returns as a playable character in Watch Dogs: Legion for owners of the game's season pass. He is additionally one of the two protagonists of the game's Bloodline expansion, alongside Wrench, a character introduced in Watch Dogs 2.

Set before the events of the base game, the expansion follows Aiden as he travels to London to reunite with Jackson, whom he has not seen in fifteen years, and complete a fixer contract given to him by Jordi. Aiden's assignment is to infiltrate Broca Tech and acquire photographic evidence of a new robot design project headed by Thomas Rempart, as well as retrieve a device called the "BrocaBridge". However, his attempt is foiled by Wrench, who also seeks the BrocaBridge. A struggle ensues between the two, which results in Wrench escaping with the BrocaBridge and Aiden being captured by Rempart's men, though the latter soon escapes and makes contact with Jackson. Despite not wanting to get involved, Jackson guides Aiden toward a DedSec contact, Connie Robinson, who helps him get set up in exchange for helping out with several tasks.

With Jackson's help, Aiden finds Wrench at his hideout and confronts him. Wrench reveals that he was hired by Rempart to design the robots for his project, but was ultimately betrayed, so he took revenge by stealing the BrocaBridge, which Rempart needs for the next phase of his project. Meanwhile, Rempart finds and captures Jackson to ransom him for the BrocaBridge. After obtaining the device from Wrench, Aiden delivers it to Rempart, unaware that it is an explosive fake created by Wrench. The explosion disfigures Rempart's face and allows Aiden and Jackson to escape, though Aiden is shot in the process and falls into a coma. Wrench allows Aiden and Jackson to stay at his hideout and obtains medical supplies to help Aiden recover.

Later, Wrench is contacted by Broca Tech's CEO Skye Larsen, who offers to help with Aiden's recovery in exchange for retaking control of her facilities from Rempart. Upon doing so, Larsen proposes an experimental trial on Jackson, using the BrocaBridge to link his mind with Aiden's. Jackson enters Aiden's mind and, after revisiting several memories from his past, helps him overcome his guilt for his role in Lena's death. Deciding to leave his vigilante persona behind, Aiden awakens from the coma and makes amends with Jackson. Aiden and Jackson then remotely help Wrench deal with Rempart, who is attempting to flee London. Following Rempart's defeat by Wrench, the former is arrested while Aiden and Wrench decide to continue working together for the time being. Sometime later, the two are called by Connie, who invites them to join DedSec as operatives, leading into the events of Legion.

=== Other media ===
Besides the games, Aiden appears as the protagonist of the novel Watch Dogs //n/Dark Clouds, written by John Shirley and released in conjunction with the first Watch Dogs game, to which it serves as a sequel. He also appears in the 2022 novel Watch Dogs: Stars and Stripes, written by Sean Grigsby and Stewart Hotston, which serves as a prequel to the Bloodline expansion for Watch Dogs: Legion.

Outside of the Watch Dogs franchise, Aiden makes a cameo appearance in the modern-day sections of Assassin's Creed Origins (2017), another video game developed by Ubisoft. He is shown in CCTV footage assassinating Olivier Garneau, a character introduced in Assassin's Creed IV: Black Flag (2013), who went missing during a trip to Chicago. However, since Ubisoft regards the Watch Dogs and Assassin's Creed series as separate continuities, this appearance is considered an Easter egg and thus non-canon. Despite this, a character implied to be Aiden would later appear in the webtoon Assassin's Creed: Forgotten Temple (2023–26) as an unidentified member of DedSec. While the character is never seen in person, only communicating remotely, he does make mention of a "Chicago incident" and working with the Assassin Brotherhood in the past, hinting at a possible connection between the Watch Dogs and Assassin's Creed universes.

== Reception ==
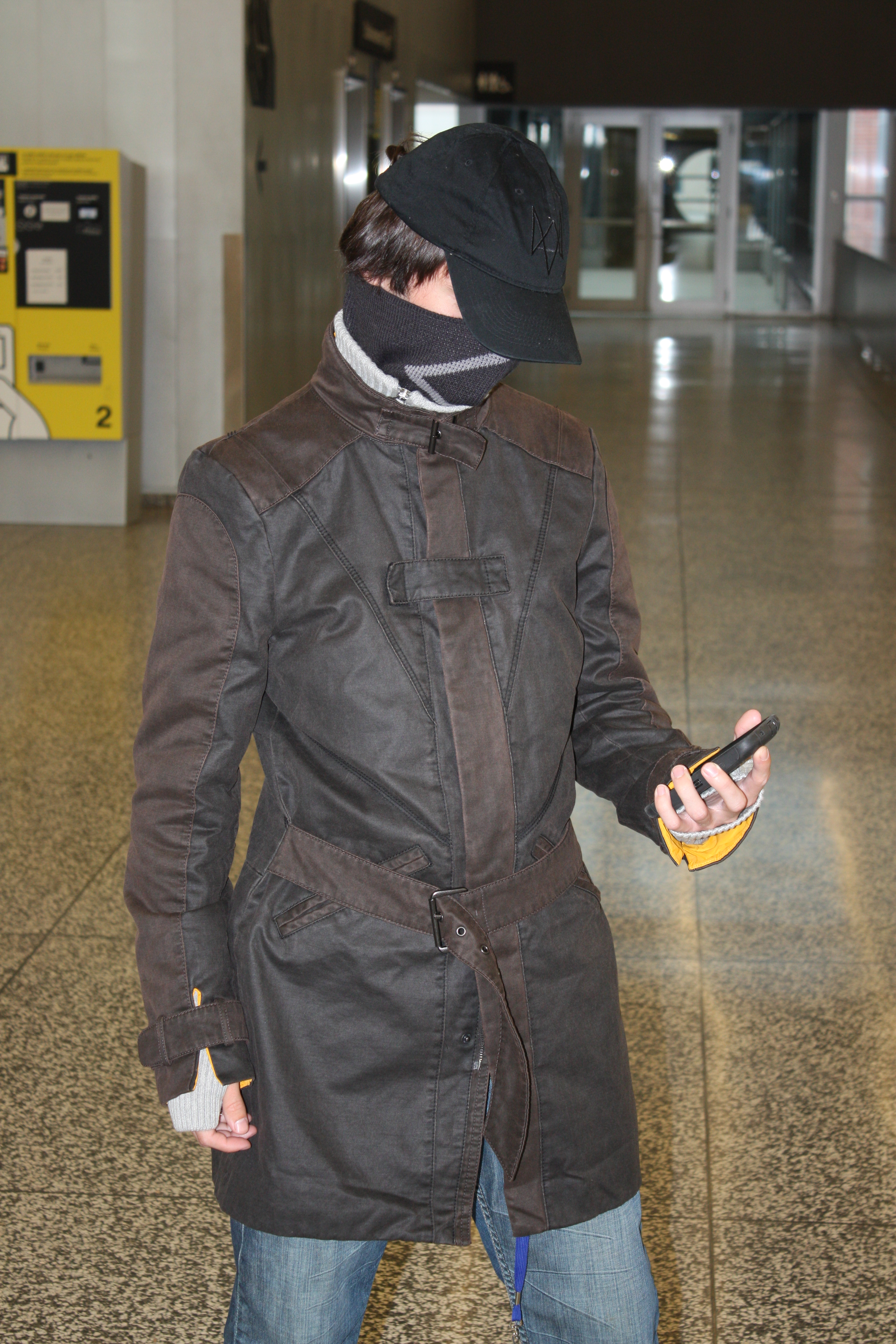
Aiden Pearce cosplay at Otakuthon 2014

In Watch Dogs, Aiden's character was the subject to criticism from critics. Dan Whitehead of Eurogamer criticized Aiden's character by stating "He steals, assaults, extorts and murders in order to exact justice for identical indignities inflicted on himself. The hypocrisy goes unchallenged.", in addition to claiming that he lacked any meaningful character development, and that he had an "insufferable" nature. Andy Hartup of GamesRadar also criticized Aiden's character, calling him "a bit of a dullard".

Kevin VanOrd of GameSpot said that the story only flourished when it left behind the "revenge-story cliches", and he felt more attached to supporting characters than to Aiden. Similarly, Dan Stapleton at IGN disliked the Aiden's lack of personality, and found the supporting cast more interesting. Christopher Livingston of PC Gamer also preferred another character to Aiden.

Aiden's character received generally positive reception from critics in the Bloodline expansion. Mike Williams of PCMag said that "Ubisoft has finally made Aiden Pearce an interesting character." James Berich of Press Start Australia stated that he found Aiden's character more likeable in Bloodline.

On the other hand, Gene Park of The Washington Post interpreted Bloodline as unusually conscious of long-running criticism of Aiden Pearce. Park argued that the original Watch Dogs suffered from ludonarrative dissonance because its revenge narrative framed Aiden as a vigilante with moral purpose while its open-world systems allowed him to behave as a prolific killer. According to Park, this contradiction becomes part of Aiden's characterization in Bloodline: his own family regards him as dangerous and unpredictable, and the narrative forces him to confront the personal consequences of his violent life. Park concluded that the expansion did not do much to improve Aiden's character from the first game and stated that "the critics who read Aiden as an unlikeable homicidal maniac were correct.".
