= Watch Dogs: Legion =

2020 video game

- Developer: Ubisoft Toronto (Note: Additional work by Ubisoft Montreal, Ubisoft Paris, Ubisoft Bucharest, Ubisoft Kyiv, Ubisoft Reflections, Ubisoft Leamington, and Ubisoft Mumbai)
- Publisher: Ubisoft
- Directors: Clint Hocking; Kent Hudson
- Producer: Sean Crooks
- Designers: Wesley Pincombe; Liz England
- Programmers: Gavin Whitlock; Matt Delbosc; Guillaume Plourde
- Artists: Joshua Cook; Patrick Ingoldsby; Po Yuen Kenny Lam
- Writers: Nitai Bessette; Cameron Labine
- Composer: Stephen Barton
- Series: Watch Dogs
- Platforms: PlayStation 4; Stadia; Windows; Xbox One; Xbox Series X/S; PlayStation 5
- Release: PS4, Stadia, Win, Xbox One; 29 October 2020; Xbox Series X/S; 10 November 2020; PlayStation 5; NA/OC: 12 November 2020 (Note: The digital version was released on 12 November, while the physical version was released on 24 November.); WW: 19 November 2020
- Genre: Action-adventure
- Modes: Single-player, multiplayer

Watch Dogs: Legion is a 2020 action-adventure game developed by Ubisoft Toronto and published by Ubisoft. It is the sequel to 2016's Watch Dogs 2 and the third installment in the Watch Dogs series. Set within a fictionalised representation of a futuristic, dystopian London, the game's story follows the hacker syndicate DedSec as they seek to clear their names after being framed for a series of terrorist bombings. While searching for the true culprits, DedSec also attempt to liberate London's citizens from the control of Albion, an oppressive private military company that has turned the city into a surveillance state following the bombings.

While the core gameplay is similar to its predecessors, consisting of a combination of shooting, driving, stealth, and hacking puzzles, Legion introduces a multiple playable characters system, allowing players to recruit virtually any non-player character found in the game's open world. Each playable character has their own unique skills and backgrounds, and can be lost permanently if players enable the option of permadeath before starting a new game. There are multiple ways to complete missions depending on which playable character is selected. In March 2021, a cooperative multiplayer mode was added to the game, allowing up to four players to complete missions or explore London together.

Watch Dogs: Legion was released for PlayStation 4, Windows, Xbox One, and Stadia on 29 October 2020 and as a launch title for Xbox Series X/S and PlayStation 5 in November. Upon release, the game received mixed reviews from critics. They were polarized over the multiple playable characters aspect, with some appreciating its diversity and the inclusion of permadeath for allowing emotional attachment from players, while others criticised the characters' lack of personality and the imbalance between their abilities. Criticism was further aimed at the game's world, driving mechanics, inconsistent difficulty, repetitive missions, online features and technical problems.

Ubisoft supported Legion after its launch, releasing a number of updates for both the single-player and multiplayer modes that added new missions, game modes, and playable characters; a crossover event with the Assassin's Creed franchise; and a paid story expansion, Bloodline, which continues the storylines of Aiden Pearce, the protagonist of the first Watch Dogs game, and Wrench, a major supporting character from Watch Dogs 2.

== Gameplay ==
In Legion, players can recruit non-playable characters to join the hacker group DedSec. Following the completion of their recruitment missions, players would be able to control them directly.

Watch Dogs: Legion is an action-adventure game played from a third-person perspective, and taking place within an open world setting based upon London, which can be explored either on foot─utilizing parkour moves─vehicles, or fast-travelling via the city's Underground stations. Eight of London's Boroughs are represented in game: Westminster, Wandsworth (specifically the Nine Elms area), Lambeth, Southwark, Camden, Islington, Hackney and Tower Hamlets, in addition to the City of London. The game is composed of several missions, including those that progress the main story, liberation missions aimed at freeing the city's boroughs featured in the setting, recruitment missions for new playable characters, and various side-activities, with players able to freely pursue a mission or activity, or explore the city for secrets and collectibles. Each mission's objectives can be handled via one or several different approaches: an open-combat approach utilizing a variety of weapons; a stealth approach utilizing the environment to avoid detection and monitoring enemy patterns; or a hacking approach using any hackable object to subdue enemies with traps or distractions, while seeking out objectives via cameras and remotely accessing them. Combat includes a mixture of gun fights─involving lethal and non-lethal firearms─and hand-to-hand combat moves, with enemies making use of different methods depending on how the player acts against them in combat (e.g., a guard hit with a punch will use melee attacks, but will begin shooting if the player draws their firearm). Players can be pursued by enemies when escaping, including hostile drones, but can lose them by utilizing hack-able environmental objects (e.g., vents) and avoiding line of sight with pursuers.

Unlike previous games in the series, Legion features the ability to use multiple characters during a playthrough, each of whom can be recruited from around the game's setting. While the player must choose a character to begin with after the story's prologue chapter, others may be recruited upon completing the initial story missions of the game from anywhere around the game's setting, which can include those working for hostile factions. Those recruited become operatives that the player can freely switch to at any time, as well as customize with different clothing options, with each recruit-able character maintaining their own lifestyle and occupation when not active (e.g., spending time drinking at a pub). Each character that can be recruited has different traits and skills, based upon their background─a spy operative has access to a silenced pistol and can summon a special spy vehicle to travel around with, armed with rockets; a hooligan operative can summon friends to help in a fist-fight; a builder operative can make use of large drones for heavy-lifting and a nail-gun for combat; while an "adrenaline junkie" operative can deal more damage, but risk the possibility of being knocked out/dying at random moments. Operatives can gain experience when used by the player, which allows them to gain additional skills and abilities to improve them, with the player able to provide additional upgrades for all characters by spending "tech points"─a collectible scattered around the city, which can be spent on weapon and gadget upgrades. In addition to standard recruitable NPCs, the player can also acquire special NPCs to their roster, known as "Prestige Operatives"; these unique characters possess exceptional weapons and gain access to stronger perks as they improve in level than standard operatives.

All potential recruits have an additional statistic, which details whether they can be recruited when approached─their thoughts on DedSec. Some recruits may not join if either they favour those that oppose them (such as a hostile faction), if the player has a character in their roster whom they hate, or if DedSec did something to harm another NPC they have good relations with. If a recruit can be brought in, players will be required to complete a mission from them related to a problem they need resolving. Examples of such a mission include sneaking into a government building to find a missing person, recovering confiscated or stolen equipment or simply helping the potential recruit determine why they are experiencing invasive surveillance. Any character that can be recruited can be killed during a playthrough, whether in combat, accidental death, or from their own traits, and permanently removed from the player's roster of playable characters if the player has the permadeath option enabled. If in permadeath mode the player loses all their characters from death or arrest, the game ends. In games with permadeath disabled, operatives will be incarcerated or hospitalised after being arrested or 'critically injured'; the time these characters spend being unable to be used can be reduced if the player recruits certain characters, such as medical or legal staff. In addition, some operatives may still die permanently, but only if they have certain traits that lead to a random and unexpected death.

=== Multiplayer ===
The online component of the game, introduced in March 2021, allows for four-player cooperative gameplay, which aimed to share progression between the single-player and multiplayer modes. The multiplayer experience offers several different activities for players to engage in, including city events, co-operative missions (including the more complex "Tactical Ops"), and the "Spiderbot Arena" competitive mode, where players controlling miniature spiderbot gadgets fight in free for all matches. The asymmetrical multiplayer mode "Invasion" from the previous two Watch Dogs games made a return several months after release, with several changes.

Like the single-player mode, players can freely explore London and recruit new operatives to their team; however, rather than completing short missions for each character, this is done by spending "Influence" (an in-game form of currency). Influence is also used to unlock gadgets and character upgrades, and can be earned from completing missions and daily/weekly objectives, bought with real-life money from the in-game store, or found across the map, along with masks and experience points (the locations of collectibles change weekly).

Watch Dogs: Legion Online uses a seasonal approach to introduce new content to the game. During each season, a different roadmap with various rewards (Influence, weapon skins, character clothing etc.) is featured. As players complete missions and other activities, they gain experience points and rank up, unlocking the next reward in the roadmap. When a season ends, the next one automatically starts and the player's rank is reset to 0.

== Synopsis ==
=== Setting ===
Watch Dogs: Legion takes place within a fictionalised representation of London in the "near future" (suggested to be the year 2029 or 2030). The setting encompasses notable landmarks, boroughs, and cultural styles of the city, such as the Palace of Westminster, Big Ben, the London Eye, Buckingham Palace, The Shard and more. Since the events of Watch Dogs 2, technology has undergone a rapid acceleration as a result of the proliferation of automation and artificial intelligence (AI), which has effectively improved Britain's economy at the cost of many blue and white collar jobs. The use of cryptocurrency has also become abundant, with an unofficial currency by the name of ETO (Electronic Transferable Object) having almost replaced the pound sterling entirely within London. AR and VR systems are commonplace across the city, accompanied by an increase in drones and electric cars, an established 6G mobile network, and the introduction of self-driving cars much of which is enhanced through the use of ctOS (central Operating System)─the centralized computer network developed by technology company Blume, featured in Watch Dogs and Watch Dogs 2.

The game focuses on the London branch of DedSec, a hacker group consisting of various branches across the world, who fight against authority regimes and groups that utilise ctOS for their own selfish goals at the expense of ordinary citizens. Their main enemies include Zero Day, a rogue hacker group that frames DedSec for a series of terrorist bombings; Albion, a private military company that takes over as law enforcement across London and supersedes the British government's control over the city; Clan Kelley, an East End criminal syndicate that has monopolised the use of the dark web, conducting human and organ trafficking operations; Broca Tech, a corrupt biotechnology corporation; and Signals Intelligence Response (SIRS), an intelligence agency formed from the consolidation of Britain's intelligence network.

=== Plot ===
The London branch of DedSec, led by Sabine Brandt and her hacked and upgraded AI, Bagley, detect armed intruders planting explosives in the Houses of Parliament. DedSec operative Dalton Wolfe goes to defuse the bombs and discovers the intruders are members of a rogue hacker group called "Zero Day". Although Dalton manages to prevent Parliament's destruction, he is gunned down by drones commanded by Zero Day's leader, who detonates additional explosives around London and orders an attack on DedSec's main hideout, forcing Sabine to shut down Bagley and go into hiding. In the wake of the bombings, the British government contract Albion with restoring order to London and hunting down DedSec, who are held responsible for the chaos, effectively causing social and political unrest.

Months later, Albion enforces the law without political oversight, transforming London into a surveillance state with the aid of its ctOS network and SIRS, a conglomerate of Britain's intelligence agencies. As a result, citizens have their personal liberties severely restricted and their lives constantly monitored, while those who question Albion's methods are either convicted or deported to Continental Europe. Organised crime, specifically London's biggest crime syndicate Clan Kelley, is also on the rise, despite Albion's presence. Although most DedSec members have been arrested or killed by Albion, Sabine resurfaces when she finds a new recruit through ctOS, who is sent to reactivate the group's safehouse and Bagley. DedSec slowly rebuild their strength as they find more recruits who, under Sabine's co-ordination and with Bagley's help, liberate London's boroughs by encouraging citizens to rise up in defiance of their oppressors.

During this time, DedSec investigate the bombings and discover that both Albion's CEO Nigel Cass and Clan Kelley's leader Mary Kelley were involved, and are taking advantage of London's current situation for their own ends: Clan Kelley is using people from Albion's deportation centers for their trafficking operations, while Cass plans to enforce peace across London with 'Project THEMIS', an oppressive army of combat drones that can identify and neutralize threats before they occur. After their investigation reaches a dead end, DedSec decide to follow other leads, such as technology company Broca Tech (the creators of Bagley), whose CEO Skye Larsen has been conducting inhumane experiments to convert human minds into AI programs; and Richard Malik, a SIRS whistleblower who enlists DedSec's help in proving SIRS leader Emma Child was behind the Zero Day bombings, only to later be revealed that he was trying to take over SIRS, which he accomplishes after killing Child in an explosion that DedSec are framed for.

DedSec eventually deal with both Larsen and Malik, before infiltrating a slave auction hosted by Mary Kelley, where they discover Kelley helped Zero Day smuggle their explosives into the country. After gathering enough evidence to get Kelley convicted, DedSec and Metropolitan Police Service (MPS) Detective Kaitlyn Lau attempt to capture her, but after realizing that Kelley will walk free regardless, they leave her to be killed by her former slaves. DedSec next sabotage Cass's drone project and expose his crimes to the public, including providing aid and planning in the Zero Day bombings, prompting him to take refuge at Albion's headquarters in the Tower of London. Fearing Cass will attempt to retaliate against his enemies, DedSec storm the Tower and kill Cass.

As DedSec celebrate their successes, Zero Day hacks the group, stealing the tech they had acquired from their enemies. Tracing the hack, they discover that Sabine was behind the bombings and Zero Day, and that Cass helped her until double-crossing her for control of data gathering technology. In response, Sabine restarted DedSec simply to get revenge on Cass, recover what he had stolen, and seek out other components. DedSec discover Sabine intends to use the stolen technology to create a patch for Bagley and take control of Britain's ctOS infrastructure, plunging the country into chaos in hopes it will force society to forgo technology and restart. To prevent this, Bagley agrees to be shut down. Avoiding the chaos caused by Sabine, a DedSec operative goes to hack Blume's radio tower, to prevent the patch from being spread. Sabine confronts them, but the operative lowers the tower's fins and sends her falling to her apparent death. Meanwhile, another operative shuts down Bagley's primary server at Broca Tech, ending the crisis.

While the British government reviews its contract with Albion and the MPS begins work to resume operations, DedSec finally clear their names and are praised for exposing considerable crimes and corruption across London. In an epilogue scene, they manage to restore Bagley to his original state, and continue to rely on him to help them finish off loose ends around London.

=== Assassin's Creed expansion ===
This non-canonical crossover with the Assassin's Creed franchise focuses on DedSec helping Darcy Clarkson, a member of the Assassin Brotherhood and a descendant of renowned 19th-century Assassins Jacob and Evie Frye. After intercepting a conversation between Darcy and a Templar, Graham Westerly, DedSec learn about the secret war between the Assassins and Templars, and that the former have been forced to leave London after being hunted to near-extinction. They also discover that Darcy returned to London to rescue her brother Lucas, who was captured while trying to free the city from the Templars' control like their ancestors had done nearly two centuries prior. After tracking down Darcy, DedSec agree to help her rescue Lucas, who is being tortured by Graham to learn the location of a hidden Assassin Tomb in London. However, Westerly murders Lucas after obtaining the information he wanted.

After finding the Tomb on the grounds of the Buckingham Palace, DedSec help Darcy get inside to investigate. She discovers statues of several Assassins, including Jacob, Evie and Edward Kenway, and a vault containing advanced technology and an Assassin outfit, which she dons. Westerly arrives moments later, accompanied by a platoon of Albion soldiers, but Darcy manages to kill them. Before dying, Westerly claims that the Templars will remain in control of London for as long as the Assassins are too afraid to fight back. After leaving the tomb, Darcy decides to stay in London to continue fighting the Templars, and accepts DedSec's invite to join them.

== Development ==
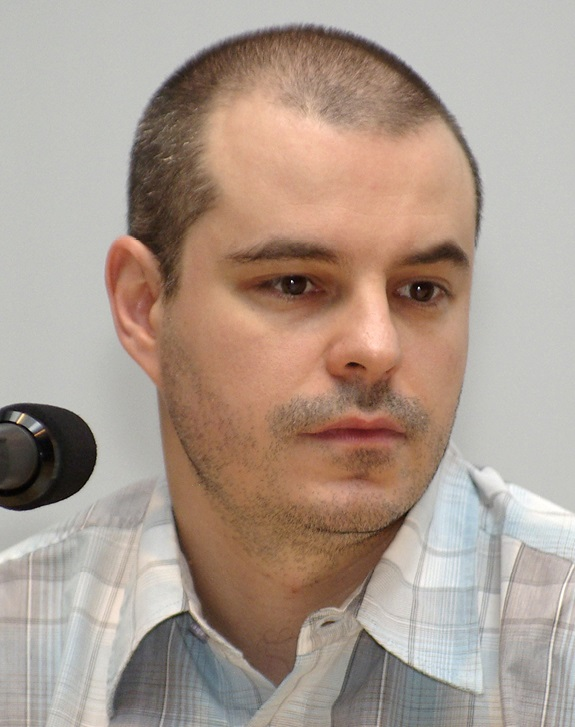
Clint Hocking is the creative director for Legion.

Watch Dogs: Legion was developed by Ubisoft Toronto, with additional work provided by sister studios Ubisoft Montreal, Ubisoft Paris, Ubisoft Bucharest, Ubisoft Kyiv and Ubisoft Reflections. The development team was headed by creative director Clint Hocking, who was recruited to assist on the game's creation due to Ubisoft moving development from their studio in Montreal to Toronto, and recruiting developers who had previously worked with him on Far Cry and Far Cry 2.

Upon its reveal at E3 2019, many outlets described the futuristic London setting as post-Brexit, what could potentially happen following the expected departure of the United Kingdom from the European Union. This choice of setting became a point of debate in the media, as there are several political questions related to post-Brexit. Hocking stated that they had come onto the idea of this setting around a year and a half before the actual Brexit vote in 2016, and that while the game does involve Brexit, the intent was not to try to debate the nature of Brexit, but to show and debate elements already existing in the world today that lead to events such as Brexit. On 25 January 2020, Hocking pointed out that, as a "creator of culture", the aim of including real-world elements such as Brexit is to provide a means of engagement for players about the world around them, though with the development team taking considerable thought on how to implement these and other events occurring in the real-world within Legion's setting.

Ubisoft partnered with British rapper Stormzy for a special in-game mission named "Fall on My Enemies" that would be available at the game's launch. Stormzy also recorded a music video for "Rainfall", from his album Heavy Is the Head, using motion capture for the game.

The game supports Deep learning super sampling DLSS (Nvidia GPU) and ray tracing technology.

=== Source leak ===
In 2020, 560 GB of Legion's development tools and assets were reportedly leaked by hackers on the Dark Web.

== Release ==
Watch Dogs: Legion was teased by Ubisoft via Twitter on 5 June 2019, before its announcement at E3 2019. The game was initially scheduled for release on 6 March 2020, with the Windows versions being exclusive titles for the Epic Games Store over a year-long period, but Ubisoft delayed the launch in October 2019. By July 2020, they announced during their "Ubisoft Forward" event, that the game would be released on 29 October 2020, for Microsoft Windows, PlayStation 4, Stadia, Windows, and Xbox One. Release dates for versions of the game for PlayStation 5 and Xbox Series X/S, unveiled during this same announcement, were made over the course of September and October: the Series X/S version was announced as a launch title for the platform after Microsoft confirmed the console's launch date for 10 November 2020; while the PlayStation 5 version was confirmed to release as a digital launch title on 12 November, with a physical copy on 24 November. A version for Amazon Luna was officially announced on 29 October, and was made available on 23 November.

In January 2020, BBC reporter Marc Cieslak conducted an interview with Hocking about the game for Click, which, in a world's first, involved using the studio's motion capture software to allow it to take place within the virtual setting of the game.

=== Additional content ===
The game's multiplayer component was initially scheduled for a 3 December release, but was pushed back to early 2021 due to numerous game-breaking glitches and bugs that needed to be fixed. The multiplayer mode was added on 9 March 2021 for most platforms, and 18 March for Microsoft Windows. However, the Tactical Ops missions weren't added until 23 March due to technical issues.

On 4 May 2021, the first major content update for the game was released, adding two new types of playable characters (DJs & First Responders), five special abilities, two gadgets, character customization options, and missions for the multiplayer mode. Season Pass exclusive content included a new mission for the single-player mode, "Swipe Right", and a new playable character, Mina Sidhu, a former test subject who has gained mind control powers. On 1 June, a new series of Tactical Ops and a free character were released. Additionally, a zombie survival horror game mode titled Legion of the Dead was made available in alpha on the Windows version of the game.

A story expansion titled Bloodline was released on 6 July 2021, both individually and as part of the Season Pass. It is a prequel to Legion, set several months before the events of the main game, and features the return of Aiden Pearce, the protagonist of the first Watch Dogs, and Wrench, a main character from Watch Dogs 2, who also become playable in the normal campaign and the online mode. The expansion adds ten story missions, and side content in the form of "Resistance Missions" for Aiden and "Fixer Contracts" for Wrench.

An update released on 24 August 2021 added Assassin's Creed-themed missions, weapons, abilities, and gadgets, as well as a new playable character, Darcy Clarkson, a member of the Assassin Brotherhood, who is available through the Season Pass. The update also introduced two new online game modes, "Invasion" and "Extraction", and a New Game Plus mode titled "Resistance Mode", which allows players to replay the single-player campaign on a higher difficulty while retaining all their previous upgrades. Furthermore, the Legion of the Dead mode was made available on consoles as well. On 30 August, as part of a crossover with the television series Money Heist, Ubisoft added a multiplayer heist mission and outfits based on the disguises worn by the show's protagonists. In January 2022, Ubisoft announced that following the release of update 5.6, the team will cease developing major content updates.

=== Tie-in media ===
A Watch Dogs: Legion prequel novel, titled Day Zero, and a companion book, titled Resistance Report, were published by Aconyte Book and Insight Editions, respectively, prior to the game's release. A spin-off comic book series was released monthly beginning in November 2021 by Behemoth in the United States and in two collected editions in France by Glénat. A prequel novel to the Bloodline expansion, titled Stars and Stripes, which follows Aiden Pearce and bridges the gap between the events of Watch Dogs and Legion, was published by Aconyte Books in April 2022.

== Reception ==
=== Critical response ===
Reception

Aggregate score
Aggregator	Score
Metacritic	PC: 72/100; PS4: 70/100; PS5: 66/100; XONE: 76/100; XSX: 74/100

Review scores
Publication	Score
Electronic Gaming Monthly	4/5
Game Informer	9/10
GameRevolution	4/5
GameSpot	8/10
GamesRadar+	3.5/5
GameStar	4/5
IGN	8/10
PC Gamer (US)	80/100
Shacknews	8/10
VG247	3/5
VideoGamer.com	5/10

Watch Dogs: Legion received "mixed or average" reviews from critics, while the Xbox One version received "generally favorable" reviews, according to review aggregator website Metacritic.

Electronic Gaming Monthly's Michael Goroff remarked that the game "offers a novel way to experience an open world, with its interconnected NPCs and the introduction of permadeath to the genre", noting that this aspect provided a real relationship between players and the characters they recruited, particularly in ensuring their survival during a playthrough. However, Goroff criticised that the recruited NPCs would not react like allies when the current operative runs into them while dealing with hostiles, and that players would need to search through considerable numbers of NPCs to find those with skills they wanted.

VG247's Lauren Aitken was critical of the background of the game's story and the repetitive nature of missions, noting how their structure remains the same even when the "difficulty suddenly ramps up after the 404 and Skye Larsen storylines", while pointing out that each mission strand's storyline was relatively short. The lack of uniqueness in the NPCs' accents was also criticised, with Aitken adding that players would mostly find it useful to go primarily for those with hacking skills, due to how much of the game requires these. Overall, they found that the game would be of interest mostly to "Watch Dogs fans and more die-hard anarchists".

On the other hand, IGN's Dan Stapleton praised the diversity of NPCs in the game, remarking that which NPCs the player decides to recruit can have a significant effect on the overall gameplay, and that this diversity enables numerous possibilities and encourages the player to use their creativity. Nevertheless, Stapleton argued that more could have been made of this diversity, and that the game did not do enough to encourage the player to recruit weaker characters. Similarly, Keza MacDonald of The Guardian declared that the game includes "the most diverse cast in gaming history" and praised the ability to recruit any non-player character but criticised that the characters do not meaningfully interact with one another. Furthermore, she noted that the game's willingness to be political was "refreshing" and commended the "impressively well-written speeches about the forces of populism and the sinister influence of the world's data giants" but noted the disparity between the writing "pantomime evil" of the game's villains, noting that the storyline "doesn't gel with the script or voice acting, which are wacky, stuffed with puns and British slang and of wildly variable quality". She concluded that "unlike the glossy, beautiful, but samey open-worlds that have dominated the genre in the past few years, [Legion] is ambitious, imperfect and unashamedly weird" and gave it 4/5 stars.

VideoGamer's Josh Wise criticised the game’s driving mechanics as "chunky".

=== Awards ===
Watch Dogs: Legion was nominated for Innovation in Accessibility at The Game Awards 2020.

=== Sales ===
During its first week on sale, Watch Dogs: Legion was the best-selling game in the UK when counting physical and digital sales, the second best-selling retail game in Switzerland at the all-format charts, and the fourth best-selling retail game in Japan at the individual-format charts. 40,962 physical copies of the PlayStation 4 version were sold that week in Japan.
