= Downgrade =

Reverting software/hardware back to an older version: opposite of upgrade

In computing, downgrading refers to reverting software (or hardware) back to an older version; downgrade is the opposite of upgrade. Programs may need to be downgraded to remove introduced bugs, restore useful removed features, and to increase speed and/or ease of use. The same can occur with machinery.

An example of a downgraded program is Gmax, a downgraded version of 3ds max used by professional computer graphics artists, free to download and simplified for ease of use.

The term "downgrade" became especially popularized during the days of Windows Vista, with users wanting to return to, or downgrade to (with some even calling it an "upgrade") Windows XP due to Vista's performance and familiarity issues.

Another reason could be that the user's applications do not support their new OS and they want to revert to an older version.

== See also ==
- Backporting
