= Watch Dogs (video game) =

2014 video game

- Developer: Ubisoft Montreal (Note: Additional work by Ubisoft Reflections, Ubisoft Paris, Ubisoft Quebec, and Ubisoft Bucharest; Ubisoft Reflections contributed nearly ninety staff members.)
- Publisher: Ubisoft
- Director: Jonathan Morin
- Producer: Dominic Guay
- Designer: Danny Bélanger
- Programmer: Patrice Zink
- Writer: Kevin Shortt
- Composer: Brian Reitzell
- Series: Watch Dogs
- Platforms: Microsoft Windows; PlayStation 3; PlayStation 4; Xbox 360; Xbox One; Wii U; Stadia
- Release: May 27, 2014: Windows, PlayStation 3, PlayStation 4, Xbox 360, Xbox One; WW: May 27, 2014 Wii U; NA: November 18, 2014; AU: November 20, 2014; EU: November 21, 2014 Stadia; WW: December 9, 2020
- Genre: Action-adventure
- Modes: Single-player, multiplayer

Watch Dogs is a 2014 action-adventure game developed by Ubisoft Montreal and published by Ubisoft. It is the first installment in the Watch Dogs series. The game is played from a third-person perspective, and its world is navigated on foot or by vehicle. Set within a fictionalized version of the Chicago metropolitan area in 2013, the single-player story follows grey hat hacker and vigilante Aiden Pearce's quest for revenge after the killing of his niece in a botched assassination attempt. An online multiplayer mode allows up to eight players to engage in cooperative and competitive gameplay.

Development of the game began in 2009, and continued for over five years. Duties were shared by many of Ubisoft's studios worldwide, with more than a thousand people involved. The developers visited Chicago to conduct field research on the setting, and used regional language for authenticity. Hacking features were created in consultation with the cyber-security company Kaspersky Lab, and the in-game control system was based on SCADA. The score was composed by Brian Reitzell, who infused it with krautrock.

Following its announcement in June 2012, Watch Dogs was widely anticipated. It was released for Microsoft Windows, PlayStation 3, PlayStation 4, Xbox 360, Xbox One, and Wii U in 2014. The game received generally favorable reviews; praise was directed at the gameplay, mission and open world design, combat system, hacking elements and mission variety, while criticism was expressed concerning technical issues, the discrepancy in graphical quality between marketing and the real game, plot, and protagonist. Watch Dogs was a commercial success, breaking the record for the biggest first-day sales of a Ubisoft game and becoming the biggest launch of a new intellectual property in the United Kingdom at the time. The game has shipped over 10 million copies. A sequel, Watch Dogs 2, was released in November 2016, and a third game, Watch Dogs: Legion, was released in October 2020.

== Gameplay ==
Players can view descriptive backgrounds of pedestrians with the in-game smartphone.

Watch Dogs is an action-adventure game, played from a third-person view. The player controls hacker Aiden Pearce, who uses his smartphone to control trains and traffic lights, infiltrate security systems, jam cellphones, access pedestrians' private information, and empty their bank accounts. System hacking involves the solving of puzzles. The game is set in a fictionalized version of Chicago ("Windy City"), an open world environment which permits free-roaming. It has a day-night cycle and dynamic weather system, which changes the behavior of non-player characters (NPCs). For melee combat, Aiden has an extensible truncheon; other combat uses handguns, shotguns, sniper rifles, machine guns, and grenade launchers. There is a slow motion option for gunplay, and the player can use proximity IEDs, grenades, and electronic lures. Lethal and non-lethal mission approaches can be enacted.

Aiden can scale vertical surfaces, hack forklifts and aerial work platforms to reach places otherwise unreachable, and can crouch behind walls to hide from enemies. The player has an array of vehicles with which to navigate the setting, including motorcycles, muscle cars, off-road vehicles, SUVs, luxury vehicles, sports cars, and speedboats. The car radio is customizable, with about fifty songs. If the player steals a car, its driver can summon the police; if the player has a good reputation, the driver may acquiesce. A good reputation may be gained by detecting (and stopping) crimes, and a bad reputation results from committing crimes. The skill tree is upgraded with points earned from hacking, combat, driving, and crafted items. Money can be used to purchase guns, outfits, and vehicles. There are several minigames, ranging from killing aliens to controlling a large, robotic spider. QR codes and audio logs are included as collectibles; ctOS towers unlock map icons and side missions. Multiplayer mode can host up to seven other free-roaming players, with whom the player may complete hacking contracts and engage in races. The player can also be hacked by others, who will perceive the target as an NPC (leaving the target to find the perpetrator). In-game invasions can be disabled, but this will reset the multiplayer skill rank to zero. Free-roaming with multiple players and decryption mode, where two teams of four are tasked with acquiring and holding data, were excluded from the Xbox 360 and PlayStation 3 versions.

The game's recreation of the Chicago metropolitan area is anchored by six regions on the map: Parker Square, which resembles the city's northern and western areas; the Loop, based on the Chicago Loop; Brandon Docks, a loose recreation of the south side's industrial district; the Wards, based on Englewood; Mad Mile, based on the Magnificent Mile; and Pawnee, a faux rural town resembling some of the city's suburbs.

== Plot ==
A fictionalized version of Chicago serves as the game's primary setting.

In 2012, Chicago becomes the first city in the world to implement ctOS (Central Operating System) – a computing network connecting every device together into a single system, developed by technology company Blume. While conducting an electronic heist at the Merlaut Hotel, hacker Aiden Pearce and his mentor and partner, Damien Brenks, trigger a silent alarm set by another hacker. Damien tries to find the hacker, giving himself and Aiden away. Fearing for his family, Aiden drives them to safety in the guise of a surprise trip to the country. On the way, hitman Maurice Vega attacks them, resulting in a car crash that kills Aiden's six-year-old niece Lena.

A year later, Aiden tracks down Vega at a baseball stadium, but is unsuccessful in learning the identity of his contractor. Leaving Vega in the hands of his partner, hired fixer Jordi Chin, Aiden visits his sister Nicole and nephew Jackson for the latter's birthday, but learns someone is harassing them. With the help of Clara Lille, a member of the hacking syndicate DedSec, Aiden tracks down the harasser, revealed to be Damien, who wanted to get Aiden's attention so that he will help him find the other hacker from the Merlaut job. Aiden refuses but, after dealing with a witness from the stadium, he learns that Damien kidnapped Nicole to force him to comply.

Setting up a hideout in the Bunker—an undetectable former Blume base with access to ctOS—Aiden and Clara track down the hacker: gang leader and Army veteran Delford 'Iraq' Wade. To reach Iraq's servers, Aiden infiltrates a human auction he is attending to copy his access key, and blackmails his cousin Tyrone "Bedbug" Hayes into acting as his inside man. Bedbug manages to obtain a data sample revealing that Iraq has information on almost every citizen of Chicago, which allows him to protect his gang from the authorities.

As the data recovered by Bedbug is encrypted beyond Aiden and Clara's abilities, they decide to track down legendary hacker and former Blume whistleblower Raymond "T-Bone" Kenney, who caused the Northeast blackout of 2003 while trying to expose the dangers of ctOS, which he had helped to create. Aiden finds Kenney and agrees to erase his identity from ctOS to allow him to return to Chicago. While infiltrating the Blume headquarters, however, he discovers that Damien gave up Kenney's location in exchange for full access to ctOS. After Aiden protects Kenney from Blume's private security forces, the pair return to Chicago. To finish downloading Iraq's server data, Aiden assaults his gang's compound, and kills Iraq when the latter confronts him.

Aiden, Kenney, and Clara are unable to decrypt Iraq's data because another hacker, JB "Defalt" Markowicz, infiltrates their system, steals the data, and deletes it from their servers. Defalt also reveals that Clara was hired to track down Aiden after the Merlaut job, therefore being indirectly responsible for Lena's death, which causes Aiden to angrily dismiss her. Meanwhile, Damien demands to know Aiden's progress, so the latter sets up a meeting where he lies that he has the data Damien wants, and demands Nicole's release. However, Damien calls Aiden's bluff and, in retaliation, exposes his identity to the authorities. After dealing with Defalt and retrieving the stolen data, Aiden tracks down Nicole with Kenney's help and rescues her, allowing her and Jackson to leave Chicago.

As Kenney finishes decrypting the data, he informs Aiden of who ordered the hit on him: Irish Mob boss and Merlaut owner Dermot "Lucky" Quinn. Aiden confronts Quinn, who reveals he ordered the hit because he believed Aiden was searching for secret video footage of Mayor Donovan Rushmore killing Rose Washington, a former Blume engineer who was used by the company and Quinn in a plot to blackmail the mayor. Aiden kills Quinn by hacking his pacemaker, but learns that the latter sent hitmen after Clara for being a liability. Unable to save Clara, Aiden makes the video of Washington's murder public, enraging Damien, who hoped to use the blackmail material for his own gain. As Damien wreaks havoc in Chicago using ctOS, Aiden shuts down the system using a virus created by Kenney, leading to a massive blackout in Chicago and other cities. He then tracks down Damien and confronts him at a lighthouse, where Jordi also arrives, having been hired to kill both men. Aiden incapacitates Jordi and kills Damien before reflecting on his role as Chicago's protector. Later, Jordi calls Aiden one last time to tell him where Vega is kept; Aiden heads there and decides his fate. Whether Maurice is killed or spared will not affect the rest of the game.

=== Bad Blood ===
In 2014, one year after the main events of Watch Dogs, Kenney decides to leave Chicago after performing what he thinks is his last hacking job: removing more data about him from the Blume servers and planting a fake trail to lead Blume away from him. However, after rescuing his former colleague Tobias Frewer from several fixers who had kidnapped him, Kenney elects to stay in the city until he learns who is out to get him and Frewer. The pair investigate the fixers trying to capture them and eventually discover that they were hired by Defalt, who is working with Blume to exact revenge on Kenney.

Kenney manages to track down Defalt, but while searching one of his hideouts, he finds mannequins representing the people who died during the blackout Kenney had caused eleven years ago. Among them is a mannequin wearing a replica of Defalt's mask, leading Kenney to realize the true reason for Defalt's vendetta against him: his brother was among the blackout victims. This angers Kenney, who had no intention of harming anyone during the blackout and has been living with the guilt ever since. After fending off fixers sent by Defalt to kill them, Kenney and Frewer infiltrate his hideout, where they are separated when Kenney is trapped in a room by Defalt, who holds a vote to decide his fate.

Forced to confront the families of the blackout victims, Kenney apologizes for his actions and admits that he may be deserving of death, but warns the audience that, if they vote to kill him, they too will have to live with the guilt of taking someone's life. Kenney's speech ultimately fails to make the majority of the audience change their minds, and they vote in favor of his execution. As Defalt releases gas into the room, Kenney begins to asphyxiate but manages to hack the building's ventilation system through Frewer's phone, rerouting the gas to Defalt's room and seemingly killing him. Frewer rescues Kenney and the two decide to stay in Chicago for the time being, hoping to recruit Aiden to help them fight against Blume.

== Development ==
Beginning in 2009 with ten people and expanding to over a thousand, Watch Dogs was developed over five years (from prototype to finished game) on a budget of about $68 million. Before its announcement in 2012, the game had the working title of Nexus. The initial sales pitch was the notion that one could control an entire city with the push of a button.

Watch Dogs runs on the game engine Disrupt, which developer Ubisoft Montreal created for it (although it was originally intended for another game in the Driver franchise and it's based on Dunia engine from Far Cry series). According to producer Dominic Guay, Disrupt has three pillars: simulation of the environment and its contents, how the environment can be affected, and the connectivity of a seamless online experience. Director Jonathan Morin said that the PlayStation 4 technology allowed for better wind and water simulations and artificial intelligence.

Regional colloquialisms specific to Chicago were added to give the game authenticity. The developer traveled to the city several times for field research, photos, recording audio, meeting people, and interviewing the Chicago Police Department to gain insight. Landmarks were designed to only resemble their real-life counterparts, because their artistic rights would have tripled the budget. Fictionalizing Chicago allowed them to fit several district themes on one map. The city was chosen as the setting for its contradictory nature, with great wealth and abject poverty. Morin said that after it was chosen, Chicago became the most-surveilled city in America.

The developers noted that character movements in games like Assassin's Creed were the same in every situation, and attempted to rectify this in Watch Dogs to contextualize protagonist Aiden Pearce. The in-game control system ctOS was based on the SCADA system, and the story was inspired by the cyber-attack by the computer worm Stuxnet on SCADA. The developers consulted the cyber-security company Kaspersky Lab (which discovered the Stuxnet worm) about the hacking features to increase their authenticity. To create hacking factions in the game (like DedSec), the developer was influenced by the hacktivist group Anonymous, state-sponsored hackers, and tales of corporate espionage.

Grand Theft Auto and Saints Row were studied to develop complex controls, so the core hacking mechanic was reduced to a single button. When the game was delayed, ideas long set aside (like the hacking of a headset) could be implemented. The score, by Brian Reitzell, was released on vinyl and CD by Invada Records in partnership with Ubisoft Music on July 28, 2014. Reitzell began composing by reading the script, concluding that krautrock would suit Watch Dogs. The game was released to manufacturing in May 2014.

== Release ==
Ubisoft announced Watch Dogs at its June 4, 2012 E3 press conference, confirming it for Microsoft Windows, PlayStation 3, and Xbox 360. A QR code that appeared in the first gameplay demonstration as viral marketing led to a website called DotConnexion, which contained information about the in-game world. PlayStation 4, Xbox One, and Wii U were announced in early 2013 as additional platforms for Watch Dogs, which was scheduled for release later that year. Originally set to be released that November, the developer delayed it until early 2014 to "not compromise on quality". The final release date was set for May 27, 2014, before its release for the Wii U on November 18 in North America, November 20 in Australia and New Zealand, and November 21 in Europe. A free mobile app was released for iOS and Android devices, with Watch Dogs players connecting with console or PC users for two racing modes.

Four collector's editions were available, and the GameStop pre-order version contained a poster by Alex Ross. Some journalists questioned the necessity for the amount of special editions, none of which included every piece of additional content or merchandise. An eBook, //n/Dark Clouds by John Shirley as a continuation of Watch Dogs, was released in conjunction with the game. Watch Dogs was marketed with a live-action sequence directed by Devin Graham and a three-part documentary series by Motherboard, Phreaked Out. After promotional material was sent to Australian media as a safe containing the game and a voicemail explaining the delivery, the Sydney offices of Nine.com.au (unaware of the voicemail) called a bomb disposal unit when the safe beeped; Ubisoft apologized to the staff.

A story expansion titled Bad Blood was released in September 2014. It is set one year after the events of Watch Dogs and follows the exploits of Raymond Kenney after Aiden Pearce left Chicago. The expansion is separate from the main game and features ten story missions, as well as new side content and gameplay mechanics, such as an RC car.

== Reception ==
Reception

Aggregate score
Aggregator	Score
Metacritic	(PC) 77/100 (PS4) 80/100 (XONE) 78/100 (WIIU) 62/100

Review scores
Publication	Score
Destructoid	8/10
Eurogamer	7/10
Game Informer	8.5/10
GameSpot	8/10
GamesRadar+	4/5
Giant Bomb	3/5
IGN	8.4/10
PC Gamer (US)	8.7/10
Polygon	8/10
VideoGamer.com	7/10

Watch Dogs' reveal at E3 2012 generated favorable reception from critics. According to leaked marketing material, it received over eighty E3 awards and nominations and G4tv called it a "truly next-gen adventure". At E3 2013, the game received over fifty awards and nominations. The following year, Ubisoft was accused of graphical downgrading after a NeoGAF forum post compared its 2012 visuals to 2014 video footage.

According to Ubisoft researcher Thomas Geffroyd, studies and quantitative analysis indicated that about sixty percent of gamers changed their view of technology after playing Watch Dogs. Chris Carter of Destructoid liked the virtual rendition of Chicago and the detail of non-player characters, concluding that the gameplay was fun. His favorite feature was the extra content, like collectibles and minigames. Eurogamer's Dan Whitehead found the car-handling "slick and intuitive" and called the visuals "dazzling". In Game Informer, Jeff Marchiafava wrote that the hacking added meaning to the combat, the shooting mechanic "make[s] full-scale firefights enjoyable", and praised the stealth approach. He found that the variety of gameplay and environments in the campaign missions provided an "entertaining" experience. Kevin VanOrd of GameSpot thought the game's primary strength was in combat and was grateful for the hacking component's contribution. VanOrd said that the story only flourished when it left behind the "revenge-story cliches", and he felt more attached to supporting characters than to Aiden Pearce. He praised the game's open world, particularly its extra content.

At GamesRadar, Andy Hartup said he enjoyed the set pieces and individual missions: "You'll enjoy Watch Dogs' narrative in piecemeal, rather than as a whole". He praised the setting's details (which he thought revealed "the city's true beauty"), and called the combat and hacking "satisfying". Dan Stapleton of IGN praised the game's visuals and the open world's "intricately detailed" map. He also enjoyed the combat: "The cover-based gunplay feels good". PC Gamer's Christopher Livingston called the hacking the game's most positive feature; although he liked the stealth, his favorite approach to battle was gunplay. For Polygon, Arthur Gies praised the combat's gunplay feature and wrote that it was "aided by a good, functional third-person cover system, which helps with more than just shooting — it also allows for effective stealth". Steven Burns of VideoGamer.com called the game "undoubtedly enjoyable, but it won't linger long in the memory".

Carter was dissatisfied with the story, citing "lifeless" characters and calling the plot's events "fairly predictable and clichéd"; the graphics were thought inferior to the game's marketing footage. Whitehead criticized the hacking for resorting to "tired old PipeMania-style" puzzles and saw the story and main character as the game's weakest aspects, saying that the script avoided the moral dilemmas offered by its setup. Marchiafava agreed with Carter that the graphics were less impressive than they were in early videos, criticizing poor character design and the story for not living up to its gameplay. Like Whitehead, VanOrd said that the predicament surrounding technology "rarely reaches any conclusions or digs very deeply". Hartup criticized the main character, calling him "a bit of a dullard", and faulted the story for its reliance on "unimaginative stereotypes". Jeff Gerstmann of Giant Bomb criticized the story and characters for a lack of organization, which he said made it difficult to care about the game. Stapleton disliked the main character's lack of personality, and found the supporting cast more interesting. Livingston saw little to like in the story, and also preferred another character to Aiden. Gies wrote, "After a promising (albeit well-trod) start, Watch Dogs' plot struggles to remain coherent", and likened the characters to caricatures. Tom Watson wrote in New Statesman that the game "has so many complex side missions and obligatory tasks that it becomes dull; it's humourlessly derivative of the open world of Grand Theft Auto V".

=== Sales ===
Watch Dogs was Ubisoft's most pre-ordered new intellectual property (IP), their second-highest pre-ordered title, the most pre-ordered game of the year (more than 800,000 copies), and the most pre-ordered game for the eighth generation of video game consoles. The company's executives predicted over 6.3 million copies in overall sales.

The day it was released, Watch Dogs sold the most copies of any Ubisoft title in a 24-hour period. It was the bestselling new IP ever in the United Kingdom in its first week (beating Assassin's Creed III's record by more than 17 percent), and was the seventeenth-largest game launch of all time in the UK. Most sales were for PlayStation 4, whose hardware sales increased by 94 percent because of Watch Dogs. After the first week, four million copies of the game had been sold. Watch Dogs sold 63,000 copies of the PlayStation 4 version and 31,000 for PlayStation 3 in its Japanese debut. By July 2014, the game had sold over eight million copies. It was the biggest video-game launch of the year in Britain until Destiny was released in September, and the third-bestselling game during the second week of that month. Nine million copies had been shipped worldwide in October, two-thirds of which were for Microsoft Windows, PlayStation 4, and Xbox One. According to Ubisoft's sales figures, Watch Dogs had sold ten million copies by the fiscal quarter ending December 31, 2014.

=== Awards ===
Year	Award	Category	Result	Ref.
2012	30th Golden Joystick Awards	One to Watch	Nominated	
2013	31st Golden Joystick Awards	Most Wanted	Nominated	
2013	VGX 2013	Most Anticipated Game	Nominated	
2014	32nd Golden Joystick Awards	Best Original Game	Nominated	
2014	32nd Golden Joystick Awards	Best Multiplayer	Nominated	
2014	32nd Golden Joystick Awards	Best Gaming Moment (being invaded)	Nominated	
2014	32nd Golden Joystick Awards	Game of the Year	Nominated	
2014	32nd Golden Joystick Awards	Studio of the Year (Ubisoft Montreal)	Won	
2014	NAVGTR Awards	Lighting/Texturing (Jean-Philippe Leroux)	Nominated	
2014	NAVGTR Awards	Performance in a Drama, Supporting (Aaron Douglas as Jordi Chin)	Nominated	
2014	NAVGTR Awards	Game, Original Adventure (Jonathan Morin)	Nominated	
2014	NAVGTR Awards	Control Design, 3D	Nominated	

== Adaptations and sequels ==
In June 2013, Variety reported that Ubisoft Motion Pictures was planning a film adaptation. That August, Sony Pictures Entertainment and New Regency were announced to be partnering with Ubisoft Motion Pictures on the project. Paul Wernick and Rhett Reese were later commissioned to write the film. An animated series is also in development.

A sequel, Watch Dogs 2, was released in November 2016. It received praise for its gameplay and setting, although its story and technical issues were criticized. A third game, Watch Dogs: Legion, was released in October 2020 to lukewarm reception.
