= Watch Dogs 2 =

2016 video game

- Developer: Ubisoft Montreal (Note: Additional work by Ubisoft Toronto, Ubisoft Reflections, Ubisoft Paris, Ubisoft Romania and Ubisoft Kyiv)
- Publisher: Ubisoft
- Directors: Jonathan Morin; Patrick Plourde; Danny Bélanger
- Producer: Dominic Guay
- Designer: Alexandre Pedneault
- Writer: Lucien Soulban
- Composer: Hudson Mohawke
- Series: Watch Dogs
- Platforms: PlayStation 4; Xbox One; Windows; Stadia
- Release: PlayStation 4, Xbox One; November 15, 2016; Windows; November 29, 2016; Stadia; December 9, 2020
- Genre: Action-adventure
- Modes: Single-player, multiplayer

Watch Dogs 2 is a 2016 action-adventure game developed by Ubisoft Montreal and published by Ubisoft. It is the sequel to 2014's Watch Dogs and the second installment in the Watch Dogs series. It was released for the PlayStation 4, Xbox One and Windows in November 2016, and for Stadia in December 2020. Set within San Francisco Bay Area, the game is played from a third-person perspective and its open world is navigated on-foot or by vehicle. Players control Marcus Holloway, a hacker who works with the hacking group DedSec to take down the city's advanced surveillance system known as ctOS. There are multiple ways to complete missions, and each successful assignment increases the follower count of DedSec. Cooperative multiplayer allows for competitive one-on-one combat and connecting with other players to neutralize a player who is causing havoc.

Ubisoft Montreal studied player feedback from the first game to assess what could be improved in Watch Dogs 2 and the setting was researched by making frequent trips to California. Ubisoft Reflections was responsible for overhauling the driving mechanic. Real hackers were consulted to validate scripts and game mechanics for authenticity and references to real-life hacktivism were fictionalized, like the Project Chanology protest. The original soundtrack was composed by Hudson Mohawke. The game was released to overall positive reception from critics which praised the game for improving upon the original Watch Dogs in areas like the hacking, setting, characters, and driving controls. However, the characterization and frequent technical issues – later patched – were cited as imperfections. Watch Dogs 2 had sold more than 10 million copies by March 2020. A sequel, Watch Dogs: Legion, was released on October 29, 2020.

== Gameplay ==
Similar to its predecessor, Watch Dogs 2 is an action-adventure game with stealth elements and played from a third-person perspective as Marcus Holloway, a young hacker. The game features an open world set in the San Francisco Bay Area, an area more than twice as large as the Chicagoland setting from Watch Dogs. It consists of four different areas: San Francisco, Oakland, Marin County (including the city of Sausalito), and Silicon Valley. Players can navigate the game's world on-foot or by the various vehicles featured in the game, such as cars, trucks, buses, cable cars, motorcycles, quad bikes, and boats. The driving mechanic was overhauled and designed to be more accessible. The player can shoot their weapons while driving. Marcus also has improved acrobatic skills, and the ability to parkour around the city. The player can use different methods to approach the game's missions, choosing between the aggressive approach, in which they defeat enemies with guns which are made with a 3D printer; explosives, like mines; or Marcus's own melee weapon, a billiard ball attached to a bungee cord. Alternatively, the player can use the stealth approach, in which they can evade enemies or paralyze them temporarily with Marcus's taser. Watch Dogs 2_{,} like its predecessor, places a particular emphasis on using environmental apparatus and the terrain to Marcus' advantage. For example, a player may hack an A/C unit to produce an electric shock when an enemy nears it. Marcus may also employ his own modular taser devices and explosives to use tactically against enemies. When law enforcement witnesses the player committing a crime, or is alerted by a non-player character (NPC), police officers will attempt to arrest the player. The game upgrades system is a returning feature, with items being divided into three categories: Ghost, Aggressor, and Trickster. Upgrades can be customized according to playstyles.

Players can hack the environment around them to advance in the missions.

Marcus can hack into various electronic devices connected to the ctOS system with his in-game smartphone. For example, Marcus can modify the personal information of NPCs to have them arrested or attacked by one of the various gangs such as the 580s, the Tezcas, the Auntie Shu Boys, the Bratva or the Sons of Ragnarok, hack and manipulate every mobile phone featured in the game, disrupt traffic by hacking cars and traffic lights, hack into monitoring cameras, and carry out "mass hacking", which hacks the electrical equipment of a large group of people. The player can also gain multiple options while hacking the same object. For instance, if the player attempts to hack a car, they can gain direct control over them, or have the car lose control and crash in a random direction. Unlike Aiden, the protagonist of the first game, Marcus has an arsenal of advanced equipment, including a quadcopter and remote-controlled car, both of which can be used for remote hacking and scouting. Marcus' apparel can be customized with over 700 articles of clothing, available for purchase in stores that maintain fashion styles unique to what is worn by the denizens in each area. The game features several main story missions, and side-missions known as "operations". Once completed, Marcus' follower count will increase.

=== Multiplayer ===
Multiplayer returns in Watch Dogs 2. The game introduces a cooperative multiplayer mode, in which players can meet and interact with other random players. They can explore the open world and complete missions together, which will also help players to gain followers. The game features an emote system, which allows players' characters to communicate with each other through basic gestures. The game can be played completely online or offline. It also features six competitive multiplayer modes:

- Hacking Invasion: A one-versus-one competitive multiplayer mode, originally featured in the first game, in which a player covertly joins another player's single-player session and steals virtual data from them. The invading player must stay hidden while stealing the data, while the defending player must identify and kill the invading player.
- Bounty Hunter: A mode introduced in the game. If an online player creates too much chaos in the world, the mode will be initiated. Alternatively, a player can manually initialize this game mode. Police, alongside one to three other players, will join the player's game with the hope of killing the hunted and claiming the bounty, which gives them experience points. The hunted could either strike back at the hunters by killing them, which gives them greater rewards, or escape from them until the bounty expires. The hunted, meanwhile, also can be assisted by another player if that player chooses to join the hunted. Players can manually place a bounty on themselves using the in-game smartphone.
- Showd0wn: A mode added in an update. In this mode, 2 teams of 2 players battle each other in short missions. Missions vary from the first team to steal the hard drives to the offensive team having to hack the servers the defensive team is protecting in a limited amount of time.
- Racing: A mode added in an update. Up to four players compete in head-to-head races to reach the finish line with drones, ekarts, boats, and bikes.
- Man vs Machine: A mode added in an update. Up to four players work together to take down a machine in a narrow time frame.
- Loot Trucks: A mode added in an update. Up to four players compete in a head-to-head battle to steal a valuable box from a truck, and escape the police and other players. This event has a chance to randomly occur while a player is free-roaming, but can also be manually triggered.

== Plot ==
In 2016, three years after the events of Chicago, San Francisco becomes the first city to install the next generation of ctOS (central Operating System) – a computing network connecting every device together into a single system, developed by technology company Blume. Hacker Marcus Holloway, punished for a crime he did not commit through ctOS 2.0, decides to join the hacking group DedSec (composed of hackers Sitara Dhawan, Josh Sauchak, Horatio Carlin, and Reginald "Wrench" Blechman), and conducts an initiation test by hacking a Blume server farm to wipe his profile from the system. DedSec determines that the new ctOS can covertly harm innocent citizens across the city, and thus decides to bring about awareness of their goals through conducting a social media campaign to recruit, by exposing corruption and crimes being conducted through the system, before bringing down Blume.

After several successful exposures, Josh discovers a number of irregularities in their follower numbers. When Marcus investigates this, he learns that DedSec has been used by Blume's CTO Dušan Nemec, in order to sell ctOS 2.0 to those frightened at being hacked. Forced to leave the city for a while, DedSec partake in a hacking event in the desert, and encounter legendary hacker Raymond "T-Bone" Kenney. Interested in assisting them, Kenney joins DedSec as they work to continue their fight against Blume. After hacking the server farm of a major internet company, the group use the data they acquire to pursue and expose corruption amongst law enforcement officers, politicians, and numerous Silicon Valley corporations. During this time, Marcus also focuses on bringing down several criminal syndicates, after one gang murders Horatio for refusing to assist them with their operations, and thwarts Dušan's attempts to disrupt DedSec's operations through a rival hacking group and the FBI.

Eventually, DedSec comes across information about the data manipulation program called "Bellwether", designed by Kenney, and learn that with both this and a new satellite network, designed to bypass undersea data cables, Dušan plans to manipulate world finances and politics, thus creating a monopoly on the entire world's electronic data. To expose this and his corruption, DedSec co-ordinates a massive operation to allow Marcus to infiltrate Blume's San Francisco headquarters by installing a backdoor exploit on one of the company's satellites, hack their servers, and feed the information of Dušan's crimes to the police. While Dušan is arrested for fraud and Blume is put under investigation, DedSec resolves to continue their fight against the company.

In an extended ending scene added in a post-release patch, two unidentified individuals note that more DedSec cells and hacktivist groups have been emerging worldwide in response to the San Francisco Blume scandal, and that it is time to put their own plans into motion. The filename of the recording seen in the ending is a set of coordinates located in Brixton, London; foreshadowing future events.

== Development ==
At E3 2014, Ubisoft executive Tony Key claimed they were satisfied with the sales of the first game, and that the brand would be turned into a long-running franchise. According to creative director Jonathan Morin, the first game's main goal was to establish the Watch Dogs brand. It was intended that they take risks with the sequel, instead of creating a more polished version of the previous game. To improve the game, Morin and his team read the reviews of the first game, and visited NeoGAF and various forums to study player feedback. Their priorities included creating a "believable" environment, giving players more freedom, and introducing a new leading character, whose personality would be completely different from that of the protagonist of the first game, Aiden Pearce. The primary developer Ubisoft Montreal worked with other subsidiaries Ubisoft Toronto, Ubisoft Paris, Ubisoft Bucharest, Ubisoft Kyiv, and Ubisoft Reflections to aid in the production. The driving mechanic was completely overhauled to make it more accessible to players, and was developed by Ubisoft Reflections, the developer of Ubisoft's own Driver series. In light of complaints about a graphical downgrade in Watch Dogs from what was seen at E3 2012, Ubisoft assured that Watch Dogs 2 would not suffer the same outcome because, unlike the first installment, it was developed for PlayStation 4 and Xbox One from the start. Another improvement from the first game was a more prominent thematic connection to the narrative. Main operations are structured like story arcs that last up to ninety minutes each, advancing the plot with each completion.

The developer worked with consultant hackers who would validate their scripts, including the use of jargon, and gameplay mechanics in order to ensure the authenticity of the subject matter. The propaganda used by the game's hacker group DedSec was influenced by animated GIF culture, glitch art and comic books from the late 1940s. David Maynor served as a hacking advisor. Content director Thomas Geffroyd, who had twenty years of experience with the hacking community, was tasked to accumulate information from hacktivists – such as author Violet Blue – and then relay it to the team. The game also features references to real life; Project Chanology was fictionalized in the mission "False Profits".

Ubisoft Montreal made frequent scouting trips to California to research the setting, and attempted to put most of the local landmarks in that region in the game. For regions that they could not put in the game, the team redesigned these locations and put them back into the game. According to producer Dominic Guay, having realistic and accurate locations featured in the game was essential for the game as they encourage players to explore the open world. Unlike many of Ubisoft's previous open world games, players do not need to climb towers in order to discover locations and missions. Instead, the game is opened up from the start, allowing players to explore the city freely. The game's new progression system, which tasks players to gain followers instead of completing main missions, was another way Ubisoft Montreal hoped to encourage exploration and make the city feel more "free". Watch Dogs 2 had around sixty programmers devoted to its development.

A sequel to Watch Dogs was rumored since its release but first officialized by publisher Ubisoft through financial reports in February and May 2016, before it was confirmed as a part of the 2016 E3 lineup. A 20-minute online reveal was hosted a couple of days later. On October 27, 2016, Watch Dogs 2 was announced to have been released to manufacturing.

The game engine is an upgraded version of Disrupt.

=== Music ===
The soundtrack was composed by Hudson Mohawke. Ingrained with a combination of electronic music and hip hop, it was approached from the palette of cult science fiction music. Ubisoft teamed up with Dutch music producer Oliver Heldens to influence the video for his track "Good Life" in the vein of DedSec. For acquiring licensed songs, an agreement was made with Amoeba Music. Mohawke's soundtrack was released separately as DedSec – Watch Dogs 2 (Original Game Soundtrack) via Warp Records.

== Release ==
On June 8, 2016, Ubisoft revealed the game would be released on November 15 of that year for PlayStation 4, Windows, and Xbox One in six separate editions. In September 2016, it was announced that Watch Dogs 2 would have enhancements on PlayStation 4 Pro. In October 2016, Ubisoft announced that the Windows version was delayed to November 29, 2016, to ensure that the game was well-optimized. It was featured on the front cover of Edge in August. Two weeks from release, Ubisoft and Samsung partnered to bundle a free digital download of Watch Dogs 2 with the purchase of their solid-state disks or curved gaming monitors. Amazon Prime copies were subject to an early release, which revealed issues with the seamless multiplayer. Ubisoft vowed to repair the feature on schedule but on the day of release, the company said it was broken – citing persistent lagging and crashing. Cooperative multiplayer was enabled a week after the game's release. A free trial lasting three hours was released for PlayStation 4 on January 17, 2017; the Xbox One version was made available for download on January 24.

Pre-ordering "The Gold Edition Collector's Edition" included additional content such as weapon skins, vehicles and drones; the "Deluxe Collector's Edition" contains the same, but excluded the season pass. Each of these, as well as the generic "Collector's Edition", contained a physical robot called "Wrench Junior", controlled by a mobile app on a smartphone or tablet computer. The "Gold Edition" came with the same items and season pass, and while the "Deluxe Edition" omitted the inclusion of the season pass, it contained all other additions. The mission "Zodiac Killer" was also exclusive to pre-order purchases. It involves the protagonist Marcus Holloway pursuing a copycat killer emulating the same modus operandi as the infamous Zodiac Killer. Amazon and Twitch Prime members were privy to free content like XP boosts and skin packs. "ScoutXpedition", a PlayStation 4 pre-order bonus mission, became free to download in January 2017.

The game was made available on the cloud-based streaming services Amazon Luna and Google Stadia on November 23, 2020, and December 9, 2020, respectively.

=== Downloadable content ===
Five downloadable content (DLC) packs have been released: the "T-Bone Content Bundle", "Human Conditions", "No Compromise", "Root Access Bundle", and "Psychedelic Pack". As per an exclusivity agreement with Sony Interactive Entertainment, all DLCs for Watch Dogs 2 were timed exclusives for PlayStation 4.

- Root Access Bundle (available in December 2016) and Psychedelic Pack (available on launch day) feature a Zodiac Killer mission as well as new outfits, cars, skins, and weapons.
- The T-Bone Content Bundle was released for PlayStation 4 on December 22, 2016, and includes a new co-op difficulty setting, "Mayhem", plus the clothes and truck of the original Watch Dogs character Raymond "T-Bone" Kenney.
- Human Conditions was released on February 21, 2017, for the PlayStation 4 and on March 23 for the Xbox One and PC, and includes three new stories set in San Francisco's science and medicine industries. The pack also includes new co-op missions featuring a new enemy class called "the Jammer", a technologically savvy enemy capable of jamming all of a player's hacker equipment, making them vulnerable to head-on attacks.
- No Compromise was released on April 18, 2017, for PlayStation 4 and was launched on 18 May for Windows and Xbox One, featuring a new story mission, outfits and weapons.

== Reception ==
Reception

Aggregate score
Aggregator	Score
Metacritic	(PC) 75/100 (PS4) 82/100 (XONE) 81/100

Review scores
Publication	Score
Destructoid	8.5/10
Electronic Gaming Monthly	8/10
Game Informer	7.75/10
GameRevolution	4.5/5
IGN	8.5/10
Polygon	8/10
VideoGamer.com	8/10

Watch Dogs 2 received "generally favorable" reviews from critics, according to review aggregator Metacritic. Technical issues on consoles were fixed with the Update 1.04 patch. In his review, Destructoid's Zack Furniss praised the sequel's tonal shift to a lack of seriousness and stated that its protagonist Marcus Holloway boasted a similar charm and wit. He thought well of the hacking component as it was suggestible to multiple fields of use, and enjoyed its nature of compatibility with a non-lethal approach; in fact, Furniss felt that for this reason firearms could have been excluded entirely. The driving was lauded as an improvement from the first game, yet technical issues like glitches and low frame rates were cited as shortcomings. To Matt Buchholtz, writing for EGM, the game signified "less a hacktivist tale and more a beautiful immersion into the San Francisco Bay". The setting, characters and story were cited as considerable refinements from its predecessor. Buchholtz discerned that the tasks demanded to gain followers were successful in encouraging world exploration. He noted however that – in context of the main character – murder made little sense, which led to increased usage of stealth. Elise Favis at Game Informer both disparaged and praised elements in comparison to those of Watch Dogs. She enjoyed that hacking was prioritized in the gameplay and the new "smoother" driving mechanic, but saw inconsistencies in the protagonist's actions versus his personality and thought supporting characters "too obnoxious and petty to be meaningful companions". Favis also experienced low frame rate capabilities on PlayStation 4.

Aron Garst of Game Revolution stated that Watch Dogs 2 had redressed "nearly every negative aspect of the original", and as such, marked a favorable change in the franchise. IGN's Dan Stapleton liked Marcus Holloway more than Aiden Pearce of the first game, and similarly appreciated the supporting characters of DedSec. Marcus' penchant for moral integrity was a noticeable contradiction for Stapleton, though, in light of the prospect to have him kill innocent people if one so chooses. Therefore, the character's personality was observed as the only preclusion to violence and an axiomatic push toward the stealth approach, which Stapleton insisted was the most accommodating of available tools. Writing for Polygon, Philip Kollar saw that Watch Dogs 2 could appeal to those able to connect with "being young, angry at the system and certain that you know what's best for the world". Its tongue-in-cheek demeanor was said to naturally coincide with the hacker culture and open world genre. San Francisco – the spaces of which were described as "cleverly designed" – never felt overwhelming in size to Kollar but inspired joy as he took advantage of the immediate ability to explore it entirely. His complaints concerned firearms; their use was considered "a complete failure of imagination" and unbelievable from the members of DedSec – "an Anonymous-esque group of peaceful hacktivists". Alice Bell of VideoGamer.com wrote in her verdict, "Watch Dogs 2 is missing a bit of refinement, and has had issues with multiplayer, but joining DedSec is still a riot and a half. It's high energy fun with engaging characters, and you can make an entire city your playground".

=== Sales ===
In November 2016, Ubisoft revealed that the game's pre-orders were disappointing for the company. Due to this, Ubisoft took a more conservative approach and reduced the sales projection for the second half of its fiscal year 2017. However, CEO Yves Guillemot was confident that the game would not be a commercial failure, and compared the game to Far Cry 3, a commercially successful game with low pre-order sales. He believed that reviews would have a great impact to the game sales due to consumers' "wait-and-see" approach. Watch Dogs 2 was the second-best-selling retail video game in the United Kingdom in its week of release, according to Chart-Track, an eighty percent decrease from the sales of the original. In the United States, the game ranked number eight in sales in January 2017. The PlayStation 4 version sold 68,796 copies in Japan. In May 2020, Ubisoft announced in their earnings report that Watch Dogs 2 has sold more than 10 million copies by the end of the 2019–20 fiscal year, which ends in March 2020.

== Sequel ==
A sequel, Watch Dogs: Legion, was teased by Ubisoft via Twitter a week before the official announcement at E3 2019, where the release date was revealed to originally be March 6, 2020, but was pushed back to an October 29 release.
