= Eku Wand =

German Designer

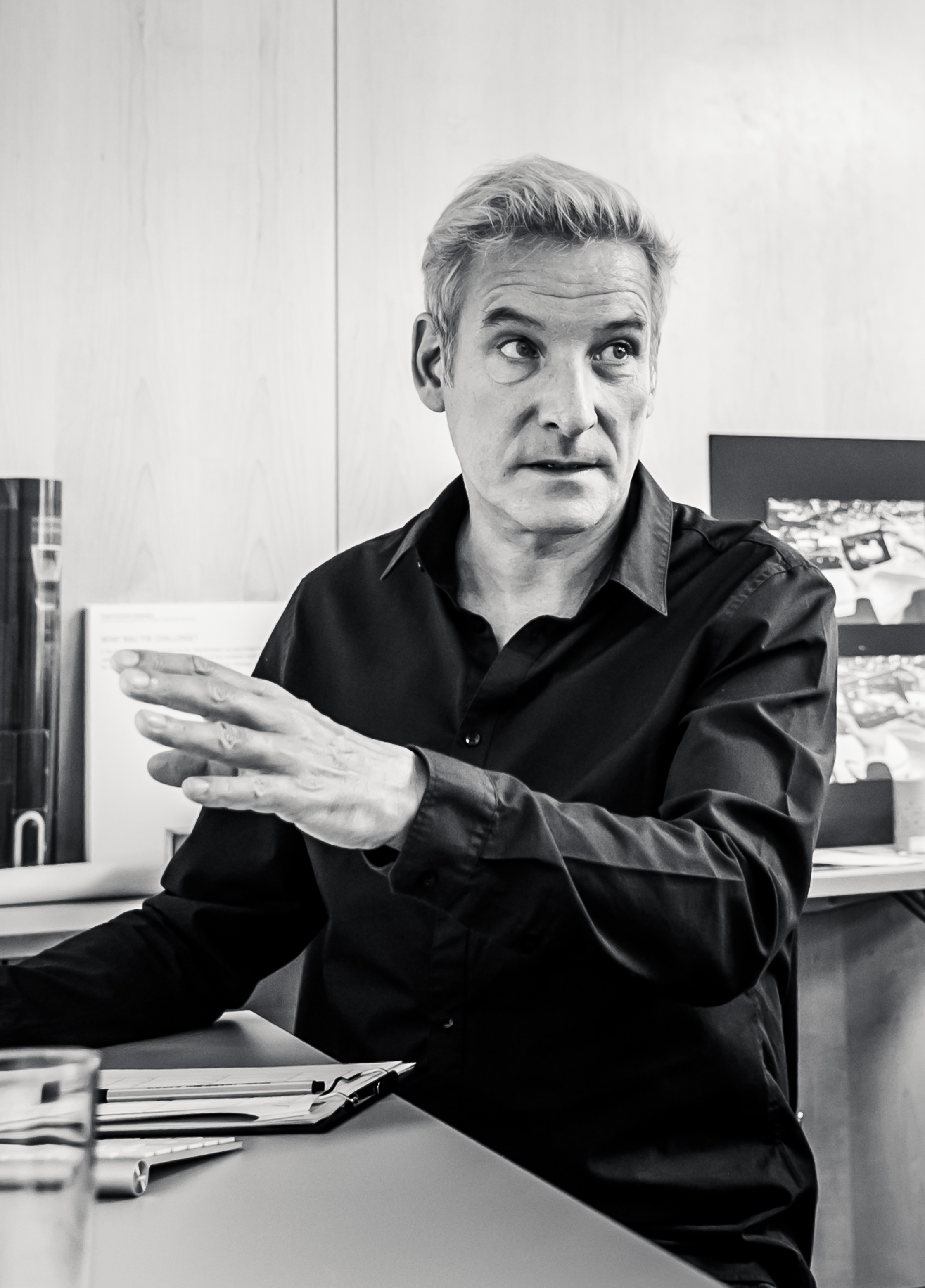
- Born: October 25, 1963 (age 62); Düsseldorf, Germany
- Occupations: Designer, Multimedia director
- Known for: Founder of Pixelpark
- Awards: Prix Pixel INA

Eku Wand (born 25 October 1963 in Düsseldorf as Uwe Wand) is a German Designer and Multimedia director. Wand is a professor of media design and multimedia at the Braunschweig University of Art with a research focus on Interactive Storytelling.

== Career ==
Eku Wand studied Visual Communication in the 1980s at the Hochschule der Künste, now the Berlin University of the Arts. After working as an art director for computer animation and video production at Cinepool in Berlin, he founded Pixelpark, now Digitas Pixelpark in Berlin, in 1991 together with Paulus Neef, where he was one of the managing directors and creative director. Pixelpark was one of the first multimedia agencies in Germany in the early 1990s and pioneered the New Economy. Neef and Wand were later classified as “Internet pioneers”.

With Pixelpark, Wand realized, for example, the interactive sales promotion terminal (kiosk system) MusicMaster for the department store chain Karstadt, which enabled customers to access more than 60,000 music and video titles via touch-sensitive screens. In 1995, the Bertelsmann Group took a stake in Pixelpark, the company transformed itself into an AG (public limited company) and went public in 1999, experiencing economic turbulence from 2001 onwards, and today belongs to the international agency group Publicis.

Wand left Pixelpark as early as 1993 because the development was moving too strongly in a purely commercial direction and the growth of the agency was too fast and he founded the multimedia studio eku interactive, which he still runs today. Here he conceived and produced interactive new media projects, designed graphical user interfaces and websites for companies in various industries.

As author, director, producer and publisher, he designed and realized edutainment CD-ROM titles and computer games as self-published productions. Among them the award-winning interactive documentary thriller “Berlin Connection”. The innovative project of a “digital scavenger hunt” combines documentary material with fiction and adventure game. Furthermore, Wand produced the interactive multimedia CD-ROM documentary “Berlin in the Underground – An Interactive Journey Through Time Under The Potsdamer Platz” together with Dietmar Arnold, First Chairman of the Berlin Underworlds Association.

Among his best-known works is the animated visualization of poems by Austrian poet and writer Ernst Jandl. Wand has received awards and prizes for his media design projects at IMAGINA, SIGGRAPH, Prix Ars Electronica and Europrix.

Eku Wand's artistic media design and multimedia works have been featured and permanently exhibited at media festivals and exhibitions, including the Centre Pompidou in Paris, the Vienna Technical Museum in Austria, and the German Hygiene Museum in Dresden.

After teaching and guest professorships in the 1990s at the Berlin University of the Arts, Zurich University of the Arts, Academy of Media Arts Cologne and Bauhaus University Weimar, Wand has been professor of media design/multimedia at the Braunschweig University of Art (HBK) since 2001.

Wand serves as a juror on expert panels and has served on the jury of the LeadAward, Webcuts Award, World Summit Awards, Serious Games Award, iF Design Awards, German Designer Club DDC and the German Design Award.

From 2009 to 2014, the German Universities Excellence Initiative for the German Games Industry is being created under the leadership of Eku Wand. In this nationwide unique cooperation, the Braunschweig University of Art and the Ostfalia University of Applied Sciences are jointly breaking new ground in the training of computer and video game developers with the Games Academy in Berlin and Frankfurt.

Between 2011 and 2017, Wand established the Indonesian citizens’ initiative “Save Bangka Island”, which aimed to prevent iron ore mining on Bangka Island (North Sulawesi) and preserve it as a habitat and nature reserve. Wand designed motifs, organized media appearances and orchestrated a long-term campaign in social media platforms and online media.

== Awards and honors ==
- 1991: Prix Pixel INA Award, Best Student Work, IMAGINA, Monte-Carlo, Monaco
- 1991: Electronic Theatre, SIGGRAPH, Las Vegas, USA
- 1992: Silver BIMA Award for Business Presentations, British Interactive Multimedia Association, London, England
- 1992: German Special Award, The 15th Tokyo Video Festival (by JVC), Tokyo, Japan
- 1993: Honorary Mention, Prix Ars Electronica, Linz, Austria
- 1998: Multimedia Award of the City of Stuttgart, 11th Stuttgarter Filmwinter, Stuttgart, Germany
- 2008: Best Children's Film, Zebra Poetry Film Festival, Berlin, Germany

== Works ==
- “Poems of Ernst Jandl” (direction und production). Computer animation. Berlin 1989.
- “Berlin Connection” – An Interactive Documentary Thriller. 2 Interactive CD-ROMs. eku interactive, Berlin 1998, ISBN 978-3-935709-00-2.
- “Smell and Memory” – Results from Neurobiology. Interactive media installation for 7 Hügel / 7 Hills Exhibition, Martin-Gropius-Bau, Berlin 2000 and permanent at German Hygiene Museum.
- “Berlin in the Underground” – An Interactive Journey Through Time Under the Potsdamer Platz. Interactive CD-ROM. eku interactive, Berlin 2001, ISBN 978-3-935709-02-6.

== Publications ==
- Wand, Eku (February 1, 2002). "Interactive Storytelling: The Renaissance of Narration". In Rieser, Martin; Zapp, Andrea (eds.). New Screen Media: Cinema/Art/Narrative. Vol. (text) and “Berlin Connection” – Structure & Design: Behind The Scenes Of An Interactive Documentary Thriller (DVD-ROM contribution). London: British Film Institute/ZKM Center for Art and Media Karlsruhe. pp. 163–178. doi:10.5040/9781838710910.0022. ISBN 978-0-85170-864-5.
- Wand, Eku (December 2, 2004). "Stories, Storylines, Events. Model: Interactive Storytelling". In Fleischmann, Monika; Reinhard, Ulrike (eds.). Digital Transformations. Vol. Media Art as an Interface of Art, Science, Economy and Society. Heidelberg. pp. 19, 242–247, 368. ISBN 978-3-934013-38-4. ISSN 1614-6662.
- Wand, Eku (March 1, 2007). "The Documentary Game "Berlin In The Underground"". In Glück, Alexander (ed.). Underground Perspectives. Vol. The Historical Use of Hidden Spaces and their Possibilities for the Future. Innsbruck: StudienVerlag. pp. 179–196. ISBN 978-3-7065-4327-9.
- Großmann, Kristina; Wand, Eku (February 6, 2018). "Social Media and the Successful Anti-Mining Campaign in Bangka, Indonesia". In Taylor & Francis Group (ed.). Journal of Contemporary Asia. Vol. 48. Issue 5: Party-State Governance and Rule in Laos. London. pp. 835–854. doi:10.1080/00472336.2018.1432675. ISSN 0047-2336. S2CID 158366552.

== Literature ==
- Anderer, Thomas (2001). Gabler Verlag (ed.). The Phoenix Phenomenon. Vol. The Development of the New Economy in Germany and What You Can Learn from It. Wiesbaden. doi:10.1007/978-3-322-82397-7. ISBN 978-3-322-82398-4.
- Waesche, Niko (2005). "Rational Exuberance. Economic Historical Comments on Financial Euphoria and Founder Optimism during the New Economy". In Ziegler, Dieter [in German] (ed.). Economic History Yearbook. Vol. 46 Trust. Issue 1. Berlin: Akademie Verlag. ISBN 3-05-004127-7.
