= Berlin Connection =

1998 German educational adventure game

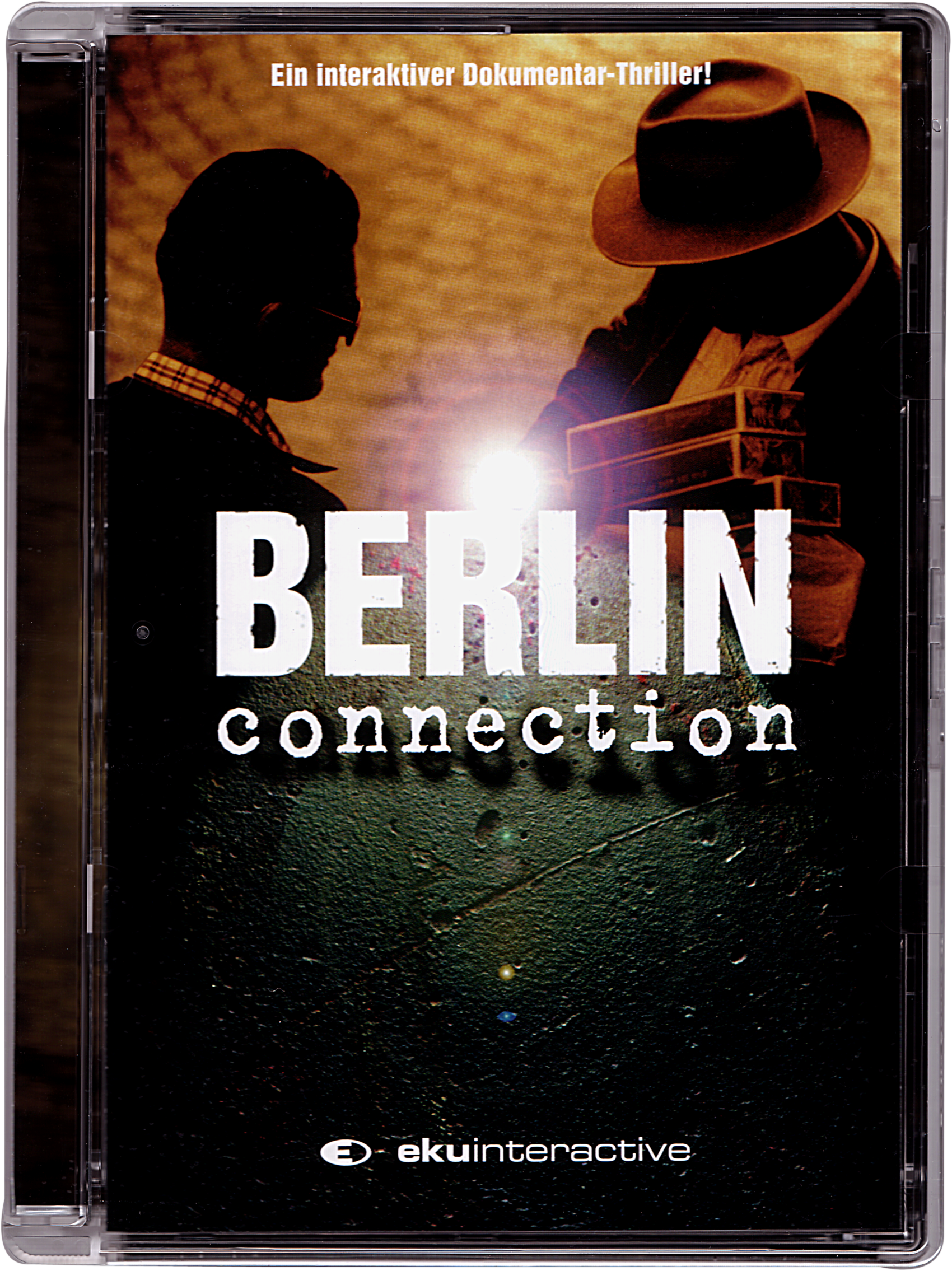
- Super jewel box cover art
- Developer: eku interactive
- Publisher: eku interactive
- Director: Eku Wand
- Producer: Eku Wand
- Designers: Andreas Kraft, Eku Wand, Bettina Westerheide
- Programmers: MacConsult, Eku Wand
- Writers: Peter Friedrich Stephan, Eku Wand
- Composer: Jens Kuphal
- Engine: In-house development
- Platforms: Mac OS 7 Microsoft Windows
- Release: DE: 29 October 1998 (1st); DE: 9 November 2001 (re-)
- Genres: Adventure; Educational; Thriller
- Mode: Single-player

Berlin Connection is a 1998 German educational adventure game by eku interactive that was released for Mac and Windows.

== Plot and game-play ==
The game sees the player take control of Roger Penrose, a journalist who researches the fall of the Berlin Wall in 1989. Throughout the game, he time travels to visit the wall at three points in its history. During this time, he falls in love with the East Berlin resident Katja. After they spend the night together, she is kidnapped and the kidnappers demand that he hand over incriminating photos that he took. Their demands lead to Roger beginning his own investigation.

The game is played in a first-person perspective. The player can navigate through photographs and click on hot-spots, as well as use their camera to take photos of key objects and use historical information provided in the game to locate items of interest. A sophisticated integrated, interactive newspaper provides the documentary background. It forms the interface to authentic reports and interviews, historical photos, original film clips and sound radio broadcasts.

The sequel to Berlin Connection (part 2) consists of 3 combined elements: a fictitious Berlin investigation committee to clarify the mysterious incidents and the existence of a Berlin Connection, a diary of Roger Penrose (both published on the Internet only), and a printed crime novel. In the tenth year after the fall of the Berlin Wall, Roger returns to Germany to find that the ghosts of the past are still very active. They prevent his testimony before a committee of inquiry, they spy on him and haunt him. He escapes several assassination attempts only through invisible helpers. Roger and his girlfriend go into hiding, but the pursuers have means of which he has no idea.

“Dangerous Game” takes characters and situations from the computer game and continues the plot in the present. The novel is self-contained and does not presuppose knowledge of the game. It is the first crime novel based on the motifs of a video game.

== Production ==
The game’s designer, Eku Wand, had previously made a name for himself in the interactive space with his multimedia production company Pixelpark, now Digitas Pixelpark, founded 1991 in Berlin. The original concept for the game was similar to a straightforward chess game of good and evil, but it was redesigned after inspiration was taken from the 1993 film The Innocent, which viewed secret agents as mysterious and enigmatic.

The developers described the game as an “interactive documentary thriller”. Eku Wand compared the challenges of Interactive storytelling that a multimedia writer and director must reckon with to the rules of the classic game of chess. The official game website contains further information to help players solve the case, such as biographies of characters and transcripts of intercepted phone calls. The game is highly detailed, with features such as recreations of street art that was present in 1989. Berlin Connection was designed so that players could complete puzzles while absorbing historical background information. The game includes 3000 photographs and numerous genuine documents from recent German history. The complete production period lasted 5 years.

The game was showcased among others at transmediale 1997, World Expo 2000, and at the ISEA2000 Village convention of ISEA International in Paris.

== Critical reception ==
transmediale comments in an early preview before the official release: “Berlin Connection is more than an interactive photo-documentary of Berlin and the history of the east-west conflict. It is a fascinating crime story in which the dimensions of fiction and documentary overlap.” Sputnik MittenDuRch felt the game served as both a multimedia Berlin travel guide and a Thriller. Literatur-Café noted the game didn't push technological boundaries, but that this was expected given its financial constraints. Faculty of Cultural Studies at Technical University of Dortmund felt the price-performance ratio was good compared to other titles. Education portal learn:line NRW wrote that the game demonstrated how interactive media could be used to make contemporary history come alive in the classroom. Reviewer Thomas Kozianka felt it was an interesting way to build historical events into an adventure game narrative. Thomas Feibel wrote it would be an effective piece of media for both gamers and teachers. Adventure Archiv thought the puzzles were varied and well-integrated into the story. The German media scientist Rolf F. Nohr wrote in his game review in 2003: “It is not only the set and screen design or the (excellent) sound design that make up the quality of Berlin Connection. It is the specificity of the narrative approach that drives the pull of this narration.”

Berlin Connection was awarded the Multimedia Award of the City of Stuttgart at the Stuttgarter Filmwinter festival in 1998. The production was awarded the title “CD-ROM of the Year 1999” by c’t – Magazine for Computer Technology as one of the most exciting concepts of recent years. It was the 6th best-selling game in Germany in October 2000.

== Publications ==
- Penrose, Roger (1999). Mechtel, Hartmut [in German]; eku interactive (eds.). "Berlin Connection: Gefährliches Spiel" [My Dangerous Game – The Diary of Roger Penrose]. Vol. Crime novel. 1st Limited edition. Berlin: eku interactive.
- Steinhau, Henry (1 January 2000). ""Berlin Connection" — ein interaktiver Dokumentar-Thriller oder: Wie vermarkte ich ein Computerspiel?". In Stephan, Peter Friedrich [in German] (ed.). Events und E-Commerce. X.media.interaktiv. Vol. Customer loyalty and brand management on the Internet. Berlin Heidelberg: Springer. pp. 325–337. doi:10.1007/978-3-642-45779-1_28. ISBN 978-3-540-66194-8.
- Wand, Eku (1 February 2002). "Interactive Storytelling: The Renaissance of Narration". In Rieser, Martin; Zapp, Andrea (eds.). New Screen Media: Cinema/Art/Narrative. Vol. (text) and “Berlin Connection” – Structure & Design: Behind The Scenes Of An Interactive Documentary Thriller (DVD-ROM contribution). London: British Film Institute/ZKM Center for Art and Media Karlsruhe. pp. 163–178. doi:10.5040/9781838710910.0022. ISBN 978-0-85170-864-5.
- Wand, Eku (2 December 2004). "Stories, Storylines, Events. Model: Interactive Storytelling". In Fleischmann, Monika; Reinhard, Ulrike (eds.). Digital Transformations. Vol. Media Art as an Interface of Art, Science, Economy and Society. Heidelberg. pp. 19, 242–247, 368. ISBN 978-3-934013-38-4. ISSN 1614-6662.
