= Games Academy =

Coordinates: 52.5124°N 13.4196°E

- Games Academy
- Type: Private / Consular
- Established: 2000
- Director: Christian Malterer
- Students: 200 (2010)
- Location: (Germany) Berlin (Germany) Frankfurt
- Website: http://www.games-academy.de/

The Games Academy is a privately held vocational school dedicated to the development of video games.

== History ==
It was founded in 2000 by Thomas Dlugaiczyk in Berlin, making it the oldest video game-focused school in Europe. In 2007, a second establishment was opened in Frankfurt am Main.

In autumn 2019, at the world's largest games fair, Gamescom, the Games Academy and the Mediadesign Hochschule (MD.H) announced their merger.

In this context, there was a change in the managing director; since 2020, Martin Adam has been in charge of the Games Academy.

Besides QANTM and Supinfogame, it is one of the few institutions in Europe that are entirely focused on video game development.

== Education ==
The Games Academy's aim is to offer students an education specialized in the video game business and/or development. Along with the Qantm Institute, the Games Academy is the only educational institution in Germany that is dedicated to such an education.

Most of the school's teachers work in the game industry. The Games Academy is often present at German video game conferences and exhibitions, such as the Gamescom or the Making Games-conference.

The Games Academy is cooperating with the FH Braunschweig/Wolfenbüttel and the Braunschweig University of Art in order to make it possible for students to obtain a recognized academic degree, a Bachelor's degree either in Media & computer science or graphic design.

In 2010, a third location was opened in Vancouver, British Columbia, Canada.

== Courses ==
- Game Design
- Game Art & Animation
- Game Programming
- Game Producing
- Film Art & Animation
- Interactive Audio Design
