= Morik =

Morik may refer to:

- Benjamin Morik (born 1968), German actor
- Katharina Morik (born 1956), German computer scientist
- Michelle Morik (born 1990), Austrian skier
- Morik the Rogue, fictional character in fantasy novels by R. A. Salvatore
- Morik, Yazidi settlement in Syria's Hama Governorate; see List of Yezidi settlements

== See also ==
- Jean-Paul Mauric (born 1933), French singer
