= Thomas Rentmeister =

German artist

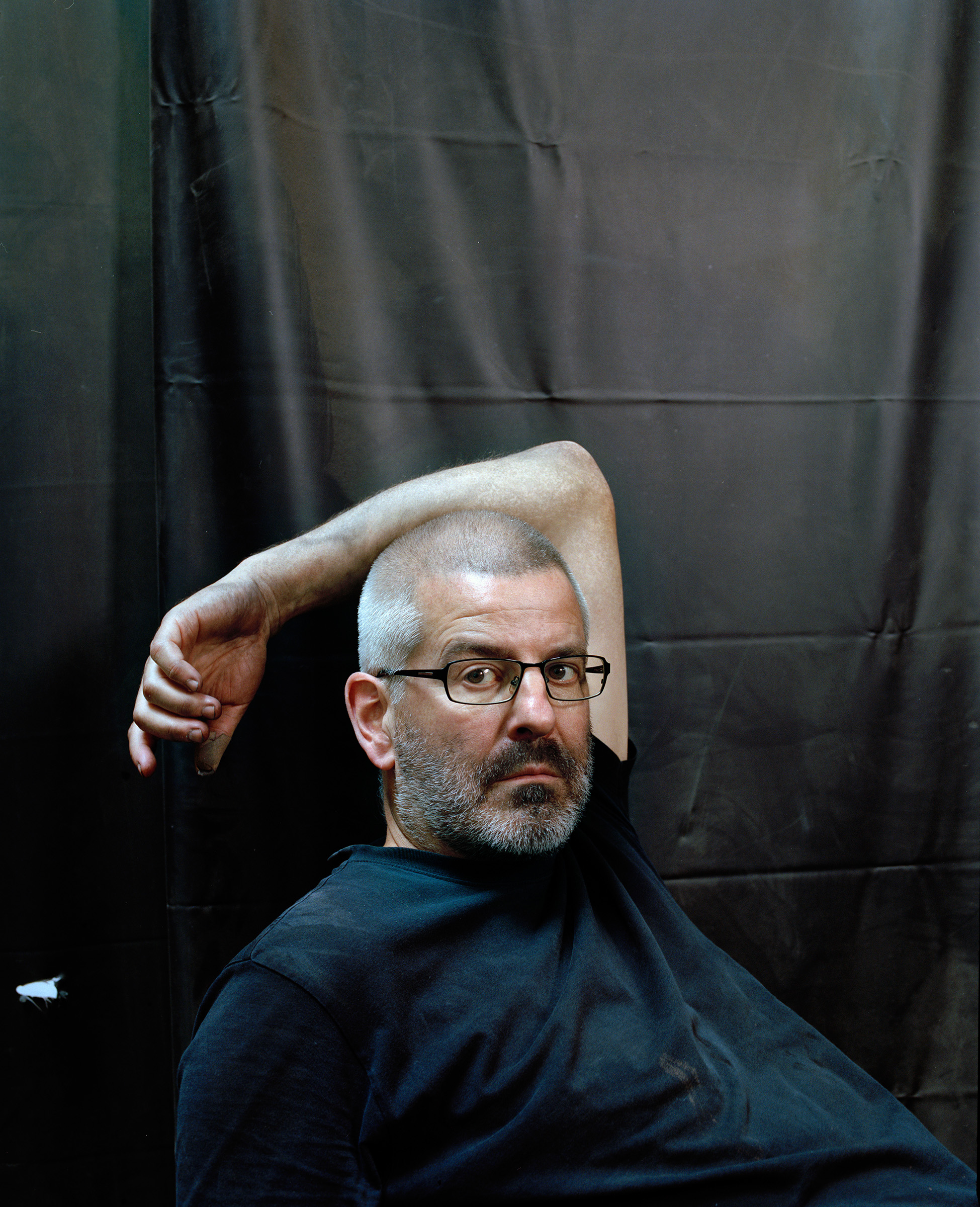
- Thomas Rentmeister photographed by Oliver Mark, Berlin 2014
- Born: 4 March 1964 (age 61); Reken, North Rhine-Westphalia, Germany
- Known for: Sculpture
- Website: www.thomasrentmeister.de/en/

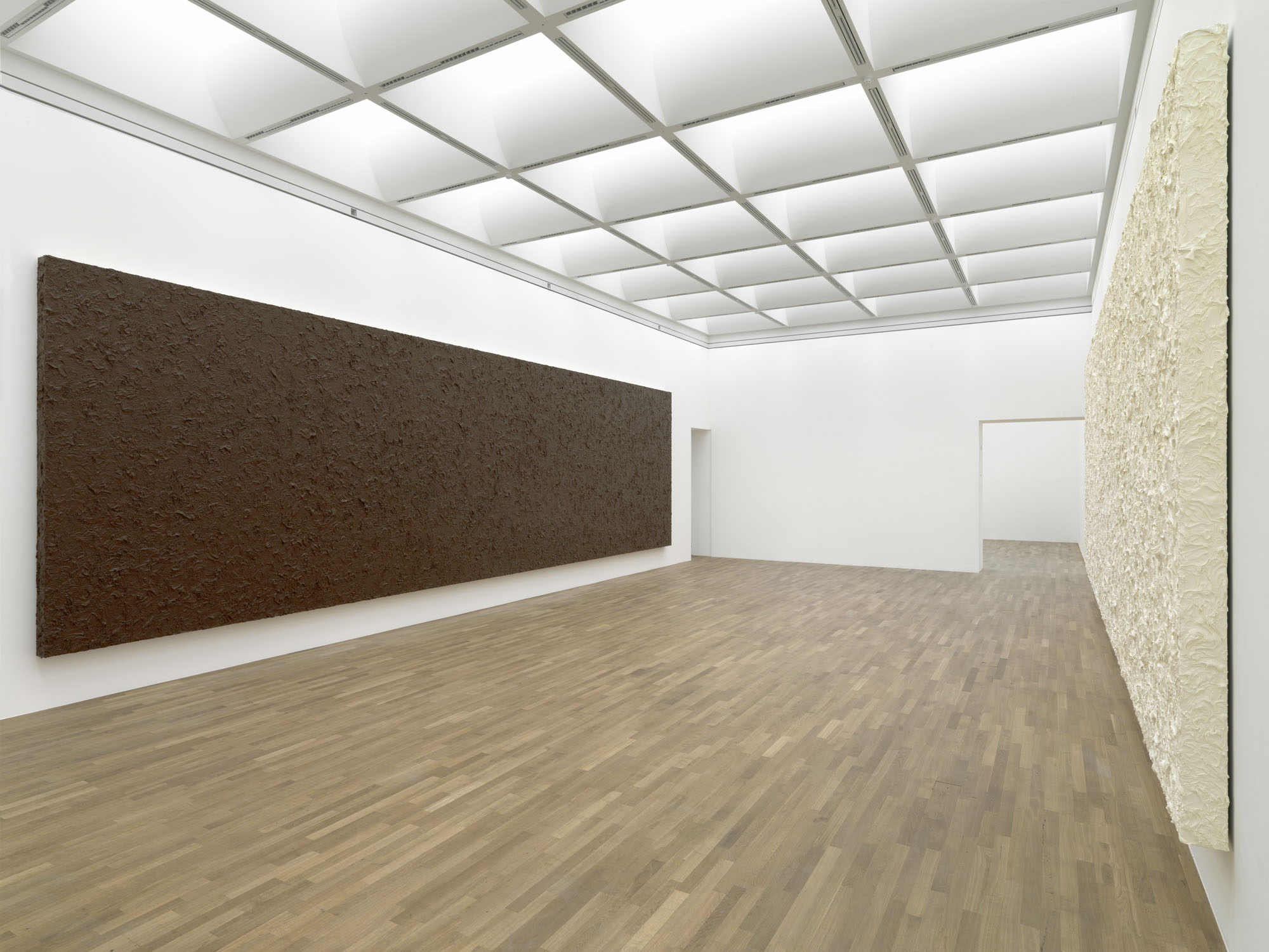
Thomas Rentmeister, on the left: untitled, 2011, Nutella on laminated chipboard, 350 × 1200 × 16 cm, exhibition view Kunstmuseum Bonn, Germany, 2011

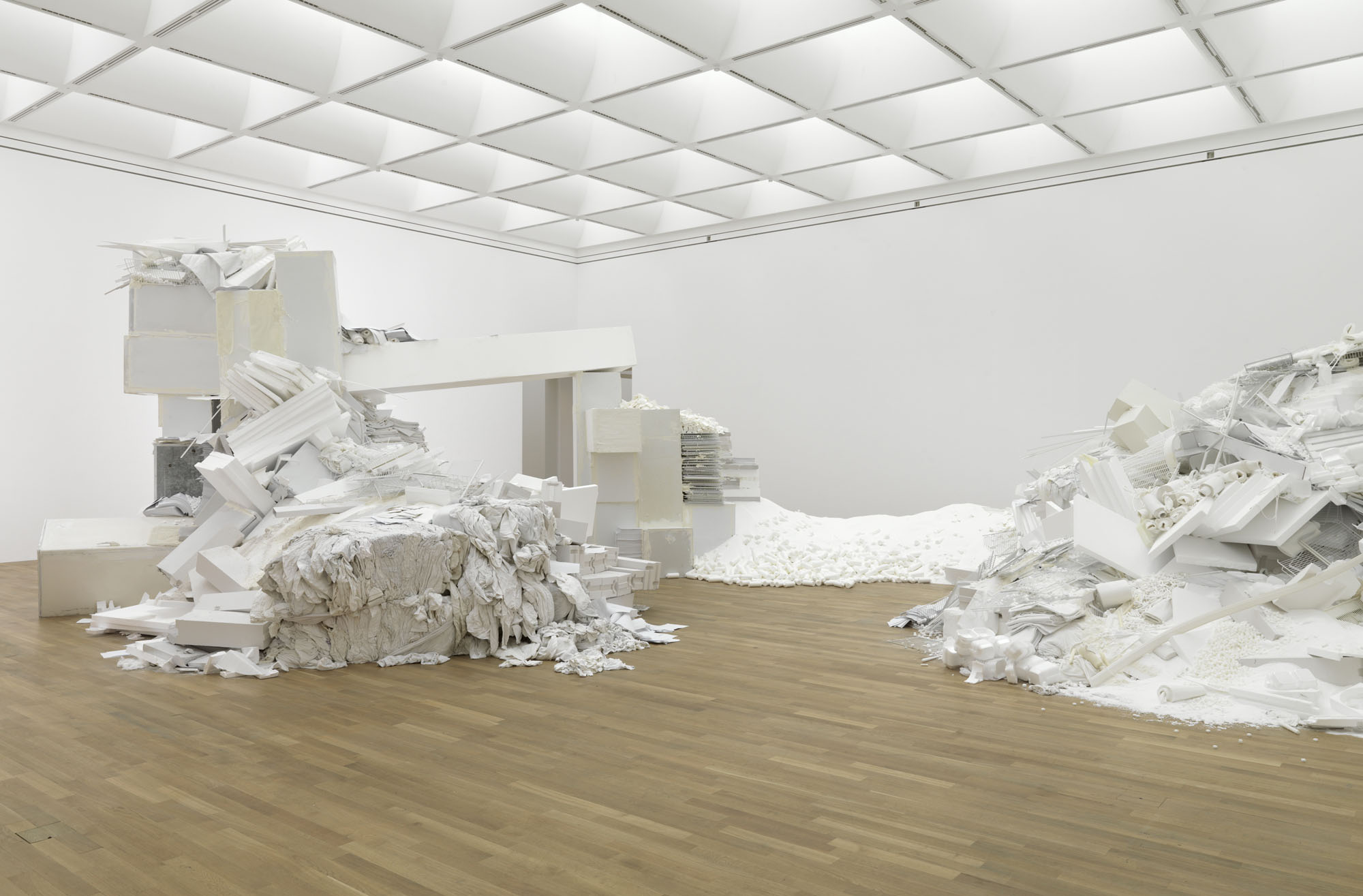
Thomas Rentmeister, Muda, 2011, various materials, approx. 385 × 1195 × 1145 cm, exhibition view Kunstmuseum Bonn, 2011

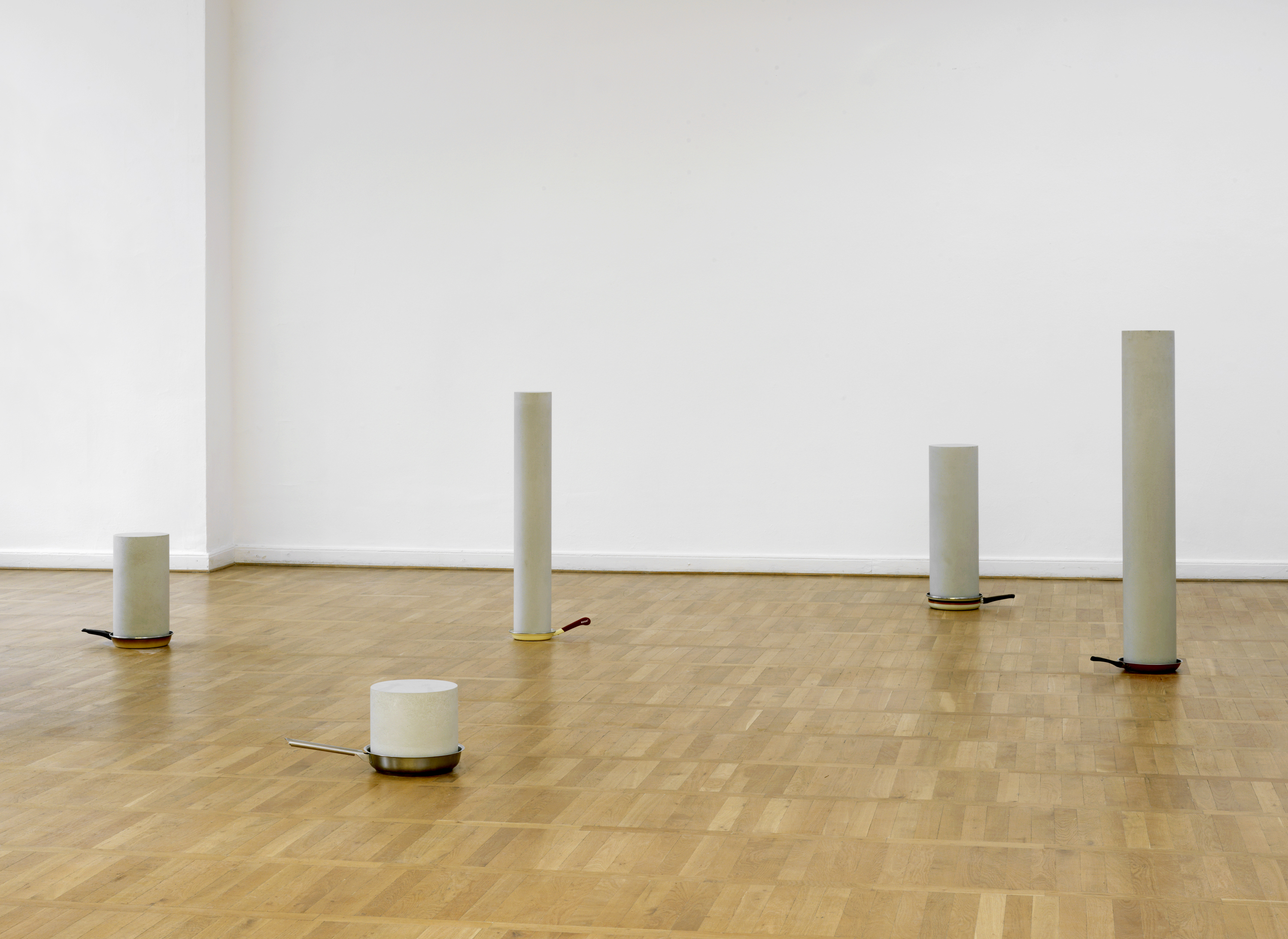
Thomas Rentmeister, untitled, 2007, frying pans, concrete, dimensions variable (25 – 131 cm), exhibition view Haus am Waldsee, Berlin 2007

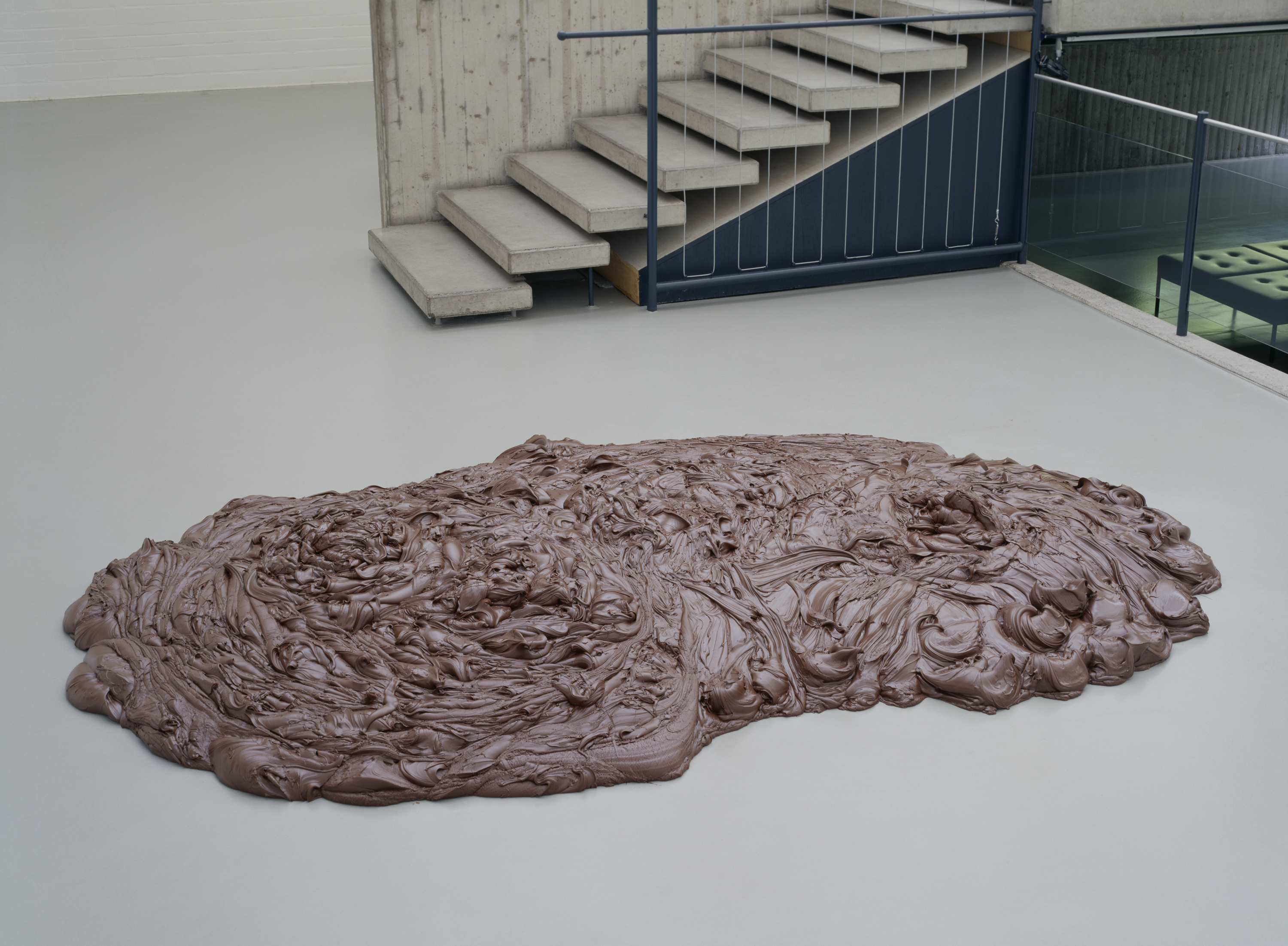
Thomas Rentmeister, untitled, 2000, Nutella, approx. 25 × 270 × 180 cm

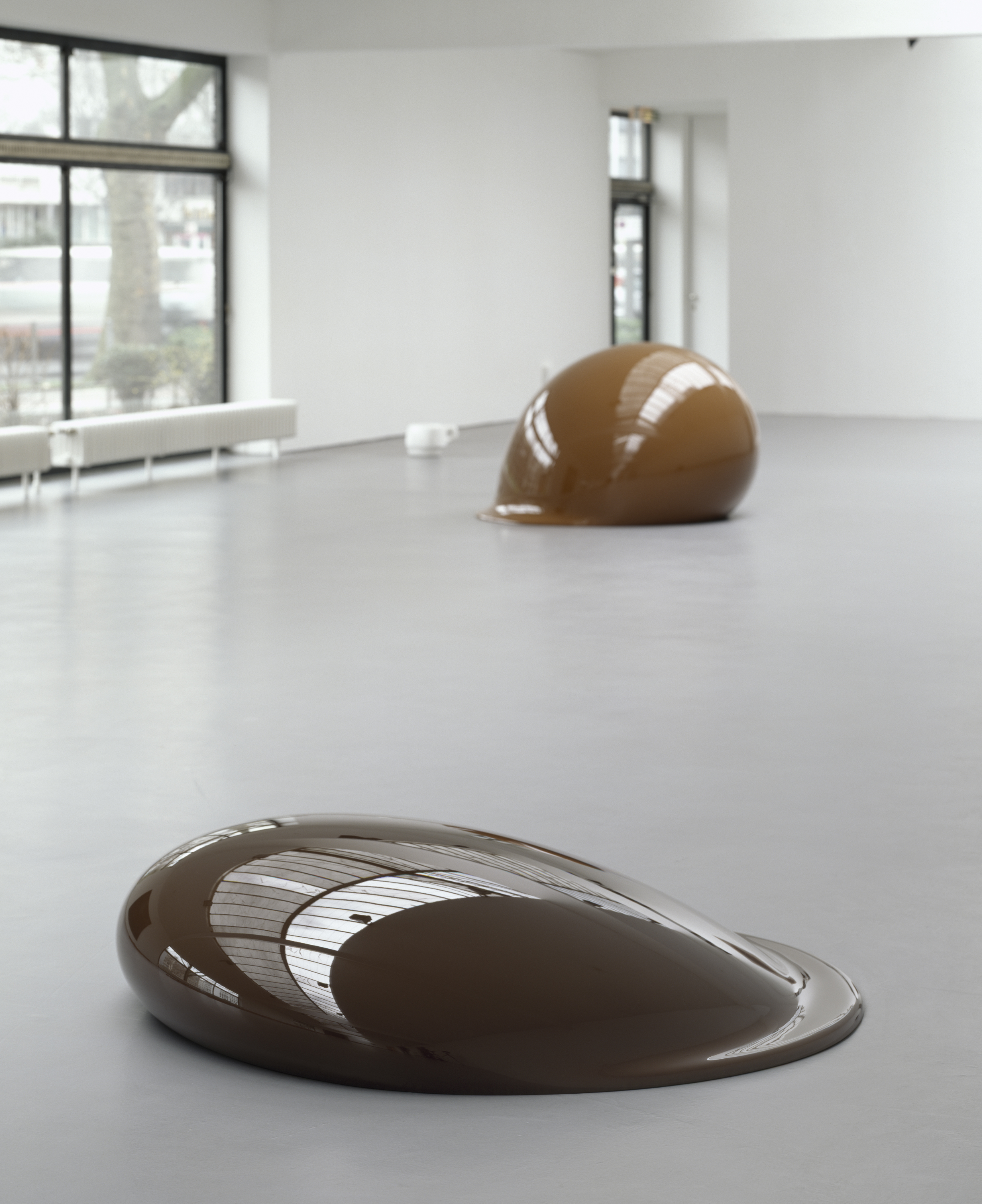
Thomas Rentmeister, in the foreground: untitled, 1994, polyester resin / in the background: untitled, 1993, polyester resin

Thomas Rentmeister (born 4 March 1964) is a German artist. He currently lives in Berlin and teaches at the Braunschweig University of Art (Hochschule für Bildende Künste Braunschweig).

== Biography ==
Rentmeister studied from 1987 to 1993 at the Kunstakademie Düsseldorf where he was taught by Günther Uecker and Alfonso Hüppi. In 1999 he became a lecturer at the Kunsthochschule Kassel. He taught at the Berlin University of the Arts from 2002 to 2004 and at the Kunsthochschule Berlin-Weißensee from 2005–2006. He became a lecturer at the Hochschule für Bildende Künste Braunschweig in 2007 and was promoted to professor in 2009.

== Work ==
Rentmeister has become known to a larger audience with his high-gloss polyester sculptures which look like oversized blobs or comic figures. Beginning in 1999, he has worked repeatedly with Nutella Spread and Penaten Baby Cream. He adopts “a set of industrially mass-produced domestic materials as units or building blocks, from sugar cubes and cotton tips to Tempo tissues, electrical sockets and whole refrigerators.” He then makes sculptures using these materials.

“His art is never a hermetic, self-contained work, an aesthetic monad; the identity of the non-artistic materials always remains recognizable.” The irreverence with which Rentmeister combines art and life is the most extraordinary aspect of his work.

Rentmeister references Minimalism but freshens up its “severe stylistic vocabulary with a healthy dash of Post Pop and Dadaist nonconformity.” Ursula Panhans-Bühler has called this “impure Minimalism.”

Exhibition catalogues and features emphasize Rentmeister’s humor. “His tools are humor and his approach is that of the parodist.” He knows how to align density in form and content with humor. But Rentmeister is more than a senior ironist. Thomas Rentmeister in an interview with Deutschlandfunk: “My work is saturated with irony; but this is not the only motivation that drives me. If you omitted the irony, my oeuvre would still work.”

Rentmeister and his work steers clear of one-dimensional definitions. “Rentmeister’s work oscillates between an emotional ‘will to art’ and a humorous art and institutional critique, between a reference to everyday life and the aspirations of art, whereby the artist carefully avoids taking a clear stand.”

The philosopher Hannes Böhringer writes in his essay “Fridge kaput”: The refrigerator installations draft “an image of an entropic end-stage in art.”

The “motor behind Rentmeister’s work” is the “balancing act between seduction and repulsion, between the aesthetic and the unpleasant. The artist wants to “find the point where the sweet, the beautiful suddenly turns into the disgusting, the repressed and the inappropriate”; according to this, Rentmeister’s whole oeuvre is characterized by a “fully developed paradoxical strategy of ambivalence.” The “theme of transience” also “discreetly but nevertheless unmistakably permeates broad sections of his oeuvre.”

== Exhibitions ==
Rentmeister has shown at numerous international galleries and museums. Rentmeister’s work was the subject of the mid-career retrospective Objects. Food. Rooms.

Selected solo exhibitions

- 2014 Considering the Matter, Meštrović Pavilion - Home of HDLU, Croatian Association of Artists, Zagreb, Croatia
- 2012 Objects. Food. Rooms., Perth Institute of Contemporary Arts, Perth, Australia
- 2011 Objects. Food. Rooms., Kunstmuseum Bonn, Germany
- 2008 Denken in Werken, Centraal Museum Utrecht, Netherlands
- 2007 Mehr, Haus am Waldsee, Berlin, Germany
- 2006 Die Löcher der Dinge, Museum Ostwall, Dortmund, Germany
- 2005 Minimal Pop, Museum Boijmans van Beuningen, Rotterdam, Netherlands
- 2004 Zwischenlandung, Kunsthalle Nürnberg, Germany
- 2002 WerkRaum.10, Hamburger Bahnhof (Berlin), Germany
- 2001 braun, Kölnischer Kunstverein, Cologne, Germany
- 1997 Centre d'Art Contemporain de Vassivière en Limousin (with Thomas Demand), France
- 1995 Abteiberg Museum, Mönchengladbach, Germany

Rentmeister's work is in numerous collections including the Arp Museum Bahnhof Rolandseck, Remagen, Germany; Kolumba, Cologne, Germany; MARTa Herford, Germany; Museum Boijmans van Beuningen, Rotterdam, Netherlands; Museum für Moderne Kunst, Frankfurt am Main, Germany; Museum Ludwig, Cologne, Germany; Museum Ostwall, Dortmund, Germany; Abteiberg Museum, Mönchengladbach, Germany; Lehmbruck-Museum, Duisburg, Germany

== Selected books ==
- Thomas Rentmeister and Christoph Schreier: Thomas Rentmeister. Objects. Food. Rooms. Kunstmuseum Bonn / Perth Institute of Contemporary Arts, 2011, ISBN 978-3-832193-96-6
- Thomas Rentmeister and Hannelore Kersting: Kunst der Gegenwart. 1960 bis 2007. Städtisches Museum Abteiberg Mönchengladbach, 2007, ISBN 978-3-924039-55-4
- Thomas Rentmeister and Ellen Seifermann: Thomas Rentmeister: Zwischenlandung, Kunsthalle Nürnberg, 2004, ISBN 978-3-7757-9196-0
- Thomas Rentmeister and Udo Kittelmann: Thomas Rentmeister: braun / brown, Kölnischer Kunstverein, 2002, ISBN 978-3-7757-9107-6
