= Alfonso Hüppi =

Swiss painter

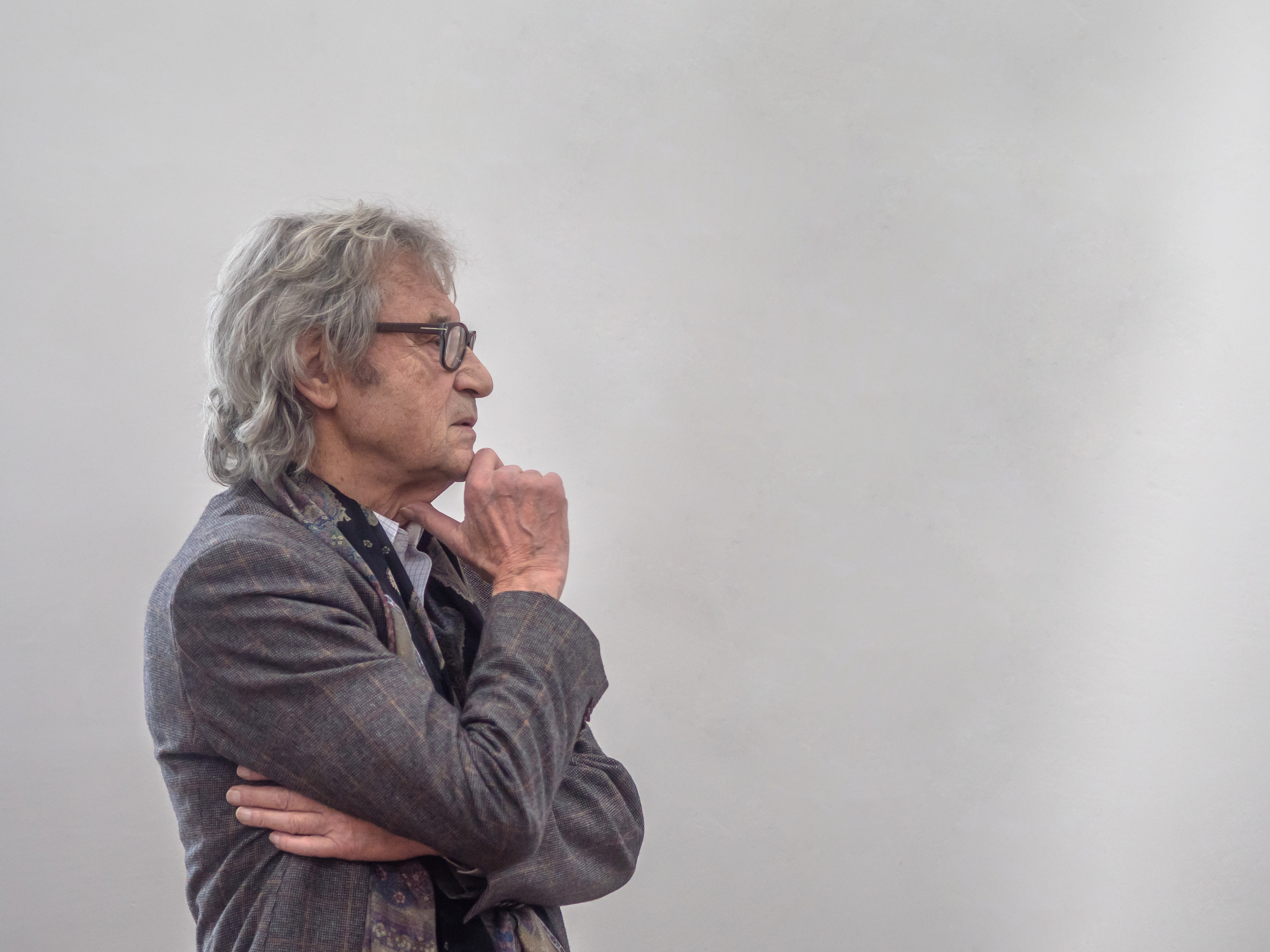
Alfonso Hüppi

Alfonso Hüppi (born 11 February 1935) is a Swiss painter.

== Biography ==
Hüppi was born 11 February 1935 in Switzerland. He was trained from 1950 to 1954 in Lucerne, Switzerland as a silversmith and worked as a journeyman until 1954.

During 1958 and 1959, he traveled in the Middle East. In 1960 he studied sculpture at the Art and School of Pforzheim and work at the College of Fine Arts in Hamburg. There he became a lecturer from 1961 to 1964 for calligraphy and design.

From 1964 to 1968 he was assistant at the Staatliche Kunsthalle Baden-Baden. From 1974 to 1999 he was a professor of painting at the Art Academy in Düsseldorf. With his class, he undertook study tours around the Mediterranean in the Middle East, Africa, Italy, Sicily, Tunisia, Egypt, Turkey, Kurdistan, Syria, Iran and Armenia. Among his students, inter alia Holger Bunk, Claus Föttinger, Bertram Jesdinsky, Silke Lever Kuehne, Horst Münch, Markus Oehlen, Thomas Rentmeister, Corinne Wasmuht.

In 1998, he co-founded with Erwin Gebert the "Museum in the Bush" in Etaneno, Namibia. Since then, he serves as the director of the museum and the artist programs.

== Exhibitions ==
A list of select exhibitions

- 2012: Kurt Tucholsky Literaturmuseum Schloss Rheinsberg
- 2013: Kunstverein Marburg
