= Braunschweig University of Art =

Art school in Braunschweig, Germany

Coordinates: 52°15′27″N 10°30′6″E

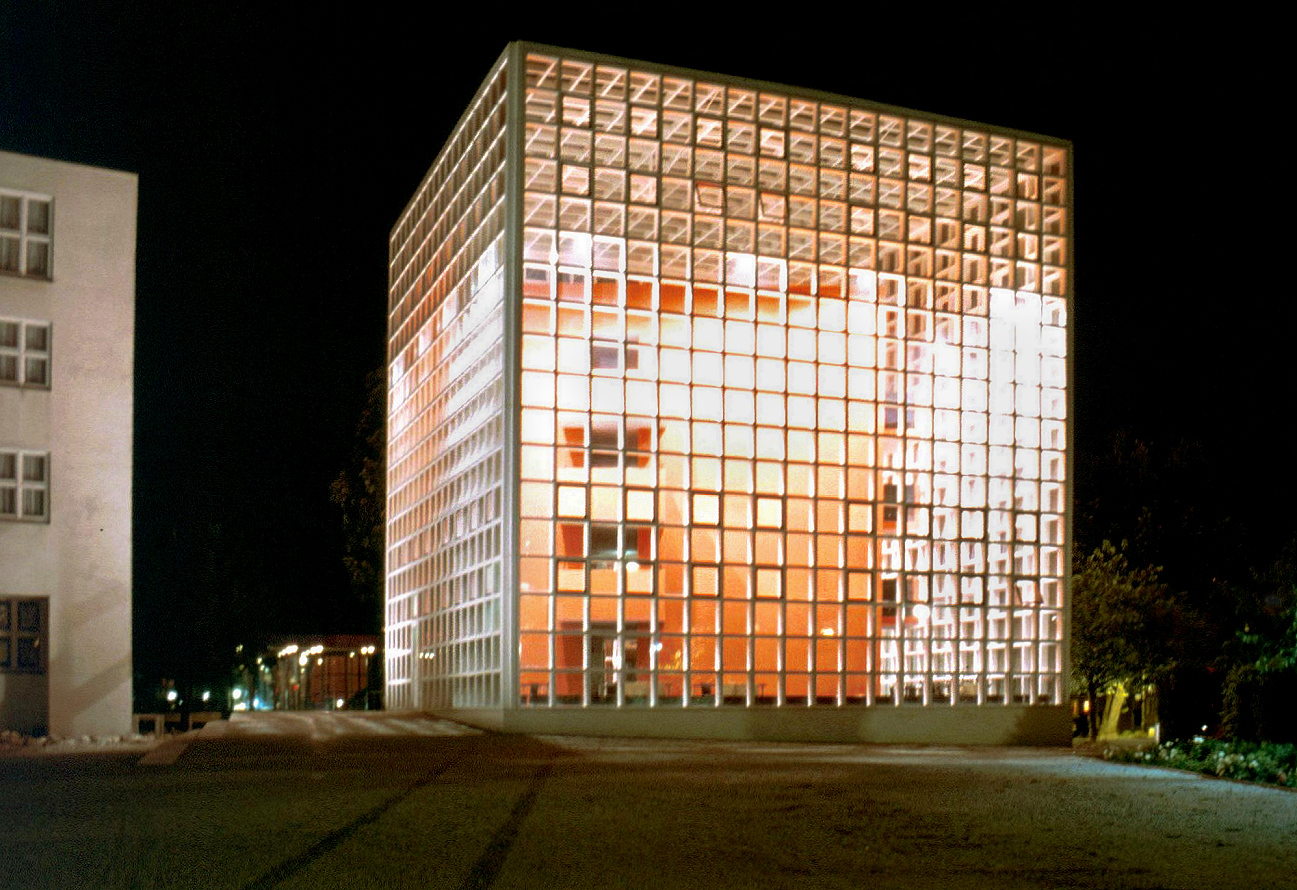
The library of the HBK, which was the Mexican Pavilion on the Expo 2000

The Braunschweig University of Art (Hochschule für Bildende Künste Braunschweig, HBK) is the second largest fine arts college in Germany.

== History ==
The history goes back to the “Zeichnen-Instithut” (Drawing Institute) founded by the Brunswick Business Association in 1841 and which was first led by Johannes Selenka. From that Drawing Institute, the state-approved urban “Handwerker-Kunstgewerbeschule” (Artisan Arts and Crafts School) developed via various stages, and shortly thereafter the “Meisterschule des Deutschen Handwerks” (Master School of German Craftsmanship) developed.

The real precursor of the HBK was founded in 1952: the urban Werkkunstschule Braunschweig (School of applied art). It became the Staatliche Hochschule für Bildende Künste (State College of Fine Arts) – abbreviated as SHFBK - and in 1978 it became the HBK. The SHFBK was already equated with the academic universities of Lower Saxony since 1972 and a few years later it was included in the Lower Saxony Higher Education Act as an artistic and scientific university. Since then the HBK has the right to award doctoral degrees as well as habilitation. Associated with this recognition was an extension in staff and space. In 1984, the award-winning new building of the Brunswick architects Kraemer, Sieverts & Partners was completed. A few years later, a multi-storied former factory building was rebuilt in which many of the artistic classes and workshops are housed. As a final addition, the library became an expansion which was built with parts of the dismantled Mexican pavilion from the EXPO 2000 by architect Ricardo Legorreta.

About 1,200 students are currently enrolled in the courses Media Studies (Bachelor and Master), Science of Art (Bachelor, Master and PhD), Fine Arts (Diploma), Visual Communication (Bachelor), Industrial Design (Bachelor, Master and phD), Art Education (Bachelor), as well as Performing Arts / Arts in Action (Bachelor, Master of Education) at HBK.

== Characteristics ==
The special profile of the HBK consists of relatively open studies. Individual projects, the discourse between students and professors and finally the discourse between the students (learning from and with each other) are supported. Students have the opportunity to link different subjects together and participate in all college courses and activities.

== Persons ==
Visual Arts

- Marina Abramović
- John Armleder
- Stephan Berg
- Candice Breitz
- Michael Brynntrup
- Jochen Gerz
- Asta Gröting
- Birgit Hein
- Thomas Huber
- Olav Christopher Jenssen
- Lothar Osterburg
- Thomas Rentmeister
- Rita Rohlfing
- Melati Suryodarmo

Visual Communication

- Eku Wand
