= Reza Asghari =

Iranian-German economist and politician (born 1964)

Member of the Bundestag
- Incumbent
- Assumed office 10 June 2025
- Preceded by: Henning Otte
- Constituency: Lower Saxony

Personal details
- Born: 1 April 1961 (age 65) Isfahan, Iran
- Party: Christian Democratic Union of Germany
- Education: Technical University of Braunschweig

Reza Asghari (Persian رضا اصغری; born 1 April 1961) is an Iranian-German economist and politician from the Christian Democratic Union (CDU). He has been a member of the German Bundestag since 2025.

== Life ==
Asghari grew up in Isfahan and in 1978 joined the youth organization of the communist Tudeh Party, which was opposed to the Shah's regime. In 1979 he began studying civil engineering. In June 1980, all universities in Iran were closed as part of the Cultural Revolution ordered by Ruhollah Khomeini after the Islamic Revolution. He was subsequently expelled for political reasons. From 1980 to 1982 he worked as a private tutor in Isfahan. In August 1983 he was arrested and initially held in custody for torture. In October 1983 he was transferred to a regular prison. He was released in March 1986. He then returned to his hometown of Isfahan to resume his studies, but was denied this. Instead he was drafted into military service, which at that time would have meant deployment in the First Gulf War . He then fled to West Berlin via Istanbul and East Berlin in August 1987. He applied for asylum, came to Braunschweig, and was recognized as a political refugee in June 1988.

From 1988 to 1989, Asghari attended a German course offered by the Otto Benecke Foundation in Hanover. In 1989, he began studying business informatics at the Technical University of Braunschweig, which he completed in 1994. This was followed by a doctorate in development and growth economics at the Technical University of Braunschweig, which he completed in 1997. He subsequently worked for Preussag and Oracle.

From 2000 to 2009, Asghari was Professor of Business Administration, Internet Economics, and E-Business at the Ostfalia University of Applied Sciences. Since 2009, he has been Professor of Entrepreneurship at the TU Braunschweig and Ostfalia University. In this role, he is also the director of the Entrepreneurship Hub located at both universities.

== Political career ==
Asghari is a member of the CDU, the CDU Economic Council Germany, and the Small and Medium-Sized Business and Economic Union. He has been a trusted lecturer at the Konrad Adenauer Foundation since 2017.

In the 2025 German federal election, Asghari ran for the federal constituency of Salzgitter-Wolfenbüttel and ranked 14th on the CDU state list, but initially failed to secure a seat in the Bundestag. On 10 June 2025, he succeeded Henning Otte in the Bundestag after Otte was elected Commissioner for the Armed Forces of the German Bundestag.

There, Asghari is a member of the Committee on the Environment and the Committee on Research, Technology, Space and Technology Assessment.
