= Olav Christopher Jenssen =

Norwegian artist

Olav Christopher Jenssen (born 2 April 1954 in Sortland Municipality, Norway) is a Norwegian artist. Jenssen is considered one of the most acclaimed contemporary Norwegian artists, with a significant international career. He has lived and worked in Berlin for years. From 1996 to 2003 he was professor of painting at the Hochschule Fine Arts in Hamburg, and since 2007, he is professor of painting at the Hochschule Fine Arts in Braunschweig. In 1992, he was selected to exhibit at the prestigious exhibition documenta in Kassel, Germany.

He was festival exhibitor in Bergen in 2000, perhaps considered to be the most prestigious solo show in Norway for a Norwegian artist. In 2015, Jenssen was appointed Knight 1st Class of the Order of St. Olav "for his contribution as an artist".

His series of paintings; "Lack of Memory" (1992) was named one the 12 most important Norwegian artworks, by Morgenbladet.
