= Michael Brynntrup =

German filmmaker

- Born: February 7, 1959 (age 67); Münster, West Germany
- Occupations: Filmmaker and artist
- Years active: 1977–present
- Website: http://www.brynntrup.de

Michael Brynntrup is a German experimental filmmaker and media artist living in Berlin. Besides experimental films and video installations, his better-known works also include electrography, digital art and internet art projects. Since 2006 he has been Professor for Film/Video at the Hochschule für Bildende Künste Braunschweig.

== Biography ==
On his website, Brynntrup summarizes his biography as: “Identical twin brother stillborn. Since then studies in Philosophy.” This mini-biography is characteristic of his artistic concerns: death, birth, doppelgängers and repetition are all motifs that can be found in almost every one of his films, and always with philosophical undertones. At the start of his film SUDDEN AND UNEXPECTED – A Déjà-Revue (1993), he highlights this with a quote from Michel de Montaigne: “To ponder death is to ponder freedom. Those who have learned to die no longer know to serve.” Freedom and its limits are a constant theme of Brynntrup’s works, in terms of both content and form. In his films, he deals with transgressions, extremes and taboos; as an experimental filmmaker, he explores (among other things) society’s media reality (such as in the film E.C.G. Expositus, 2003), and strives to develop a filmic language that goes far beyond technical limits, commonly accepted ways of seeing and cinematic conventions.

Michael Brynntrup (aka Brinntrup, Bryntrup) comes from a long-established Westphalian farming family near Münster, Germany, where he also studied law, before changing to philosophy. In 1981, he moved to Freiburg to study literature and art history. He formulated his theoretical analysis of contemporary art in a 1981 essay entitled Eine Vorstudie zum Schlusspkt. (A Preliminary Study on the End Pt.).

== Works and reception ==
During a months-long visit to Italy (1981/82), Brynntrup began working on his first film SEPTEMBER, RAGE, A Journey, which he then finished in Berlin in 1982. He has lived in Berlin ever since. Until the late 1980s, he worked with Super 8 almost exclusively. He created various multiple projection works, film performances and primarily short films, which found a wide audience in the boom years of Super 8. The best-known film from this period is Jesus – The Film (1986), a two-hour monumental film shot on Super 8 with contributions from more than twenty Super 8 filmmakers and artmaking groups, who each contributed an episode from the New Testament. “This film is the largest collective project in German film history. In the history of world cinema there are few works that can compare.”

The end of the 80s saw the start of The Ivory Elephant, a film cycle of eight death dances or danses macabres, featuring episodes with different performance artists each interacting with a skull. This film cycle concluded in 1993 with a 16 mm film entitled SUDDEN AND UNEXPECTED – A Déjà-Revue. This cycle of death dances, along with other early films, already reflected the impact of the AIDS crisis; in the 1990s, Brynntrup then began devoting more attention to the theme of homosexuality. Films such as Aide Mémoire and Loverfilm were screened around the world at gay and lesbian film festivals, as well as short film and experimental film festivals, winning numerous prizes (e.g. Special Jury Prize of German Film Critics at the 1996 Oberhausen Short Film Festival, and Award for Best Experimental Work at the 1998 Images Festival in Toronto).

Starting in the mid-90s, Brynntrup developed several projects for CD-ROM and other interactive media. His first film for the internet was KEIN FILM | NO FILM (1999), which exists in two versions. “One Film – Two Originals: the internet version in ‘online quality’ (www.brynntrup.de/nofilm) and the 35 mm version: coming soon to a film festival near you!” A forerunner of the blog can be seen in his project TABU2000 (1994). “Michael Brynntrup does not keep his diaries shut up. He provides access to the pages which he has written since 1979 on tabu2000.net. Brynntrup offers his chronicles there for sale. The artist levels the process of creating value by placing the acquired facsimile online thus making it accessible to everyone. In this way, the act of purchasing does not entail taking something away from the larger public but rather making it available to them.”

Starting in 2001, Brynntrup began undertaking annual trips to Far East Asia, during which he worked on the thematic series Gelbfieber ("Yellow Fever"). This resulted in numerous video installations and photographs, which were summarized in a 2011/12 site-specific installation entitled GELBFIEBER [Inkubation] ("YELLOW FEVER [Incubation]"). “He thus ingeniously challenges us to look slowly and carefully in his work for what is explicitly not there. Michael Brynntrup has fortunately not altered his signature touch, that is to say, his singular provocation of the viewer.”

Brynntrup’s works deliberately bypass the art market when they (e.g. in tabu2000.net) ironically comment on the art world’s “operating system”, subverting it by creating a direct channel to the audience, without gallery mediation. Many of his works present explicitly autobiographical, almost private details, turning the audience into confidants and collaborationists (e.g. in Loverfilm – An Uncontrolled Dispersion Of Information). In many cases, the audience is directly addressed by the screen: “Dear Audience. You will now see...” (e.g. in The Statics – Engineering Memory Bridges). In many of his works, the screening space and the public’s physical reactions are yet another topical focus (e.g. in ACHTUNG – die Achtung). This aspect becomes even more intensified with his walk-in video installations.

Copies of his films are released in numbered, but unlimited, editions. Only a few of his actual FilmVideo works are available online. Although most of his internet art projects are posted online, they are hidden within the labyrinthine construct of his website, which he describes as an independent artistic work ("Here ends the internet").

Since 1983, more than fifteen of his films were premiered at the Berlin International Film Festival in various sections (Panorama, Forum of New Cinema, Forum Expanded). New York’s Museum of Modern Art has devoted several film exhibitions to him, in 1987, 1992 and 1999. Retrospectives of his work have been featured at numerous experimental and short film festivals (e.g. 1988 Hamburg International Short Film Festival, 2004 Tampere Film Festival).

== Exhibitions (selection) ==
- 2012 GELBFIEBER [Inkubation], Exhibition at the Hochschulgalerie der HBK Braunschweig
- 2011 KLEX – Kuala Lumpur Experimental Film and Video Festival, Werkschau, Kuala Lumpur
- 2011 Internationales Filmfest Braunschweig, Werkschau, Braunschweig
- 2011 GELBFIEBER, Exhibition at the Galerie M, Berlin
- 2007 EXiS – Experimental Film and Video Festival, Werkschau, Seoul
- 2005 Festival Paris Cinéma, Werkschau Focus on Director, Paris
- 2004 Tampere Film Festival, Werkschau Up Close And Personal, Tampere
- 2003 São Paulo International Short Film Festival, Werkschau, São Paulo
- 2002 Achtung, Exhibition at the 'Rotes Foyer' at Kino Arsenal at the Arsenal Institute for Film and Video Art, Berlin
- 1999 Hier Endet Das Internet, Berlin
- 1996 Herzsofort.Setzung, Stuttgarter Filmwinter, Exhibition at the Künstlerhaus Stuttgart
- 1992 Lebende Bilder - still lives, Werkschau, The Museum of Modern Art, New York
- 1988 So Sieht Eine Prise Aus, Internationales Kurzfilm-Festival Hamburg, Werkschau, Hamburg
- 1987 Cineprobe, Werkschau, The Museum of Modern Art, New York
- 1986 Missionstournee, Jesusfilm-Tour of 40 cities in the FRG
- 1985 Viele Tiere Fressen Ihre Nachgeburt Auf, Interfilm 3, Kino Eiszeit Berlin

== Filmography (selection) ==
- Total Lunar Eclipse Over the Ocean, 2011
- IMAGEFILM_101010, 2010
- Face It! (Cast Your Self), 2007
- Tabu2000.net, 2006
- Das Ovo (Ovo – das Video), 2005 (mit Ovo Maltine)
- Blue Box Blues (die Inszenierung einer Fotografie), 2004
- E.K.G. Expositus (die öffentlichen und die künstlerischen Medien), 2003
- Stummfilm für Gehörlose (online), 2002
- Achtung – die Achtung (concentration chair), 2001 (mit Mario Brendel, Ron Athey)
- Kein Film | No Film, 2000
- NY 'NY 'n why not, 1999
- Tabu V (wovon man nicht sprechen kann), 1998
- Loverfilm – eine unkontrollierte Freisetzung von Information, 1996
- Aide Mémoire – ein schwules Gedächtnisprotokoll, 1995 (mit Jürgen Baldiga)
- Plötzlich und unerwartet – eine Déjà-Revue, 1993 (mit Mara Mattuschka, Udo Kier, Ichgola Androgyn)
- Homo Erectus, 1989–93
- Liebe, Eifersucht und Rache, 1991 (mit BeV StroganoV)
- Die Statik der Eselsbrücken, 1990
- Narziss und Echo, 1989 (mit Tima die Göttliche)
- Höllensimulation – frei nach Platos Höhlengleichnis, 1987
- Jesus – Der Film, 1986
- So sieht eine Prise aus, 1983–85
- Handfest – freiwillige Selbstkontrolle, 1984
- Der Rhein – ein deutsches Märchen, 1983
- September, Wut, eine Reise, 1982
