= Birgit Hein =

German film director (1942–2023)

- Born: 6 August 1942; Berlin, Germany
- Died: 23 February 2023 (aged 80)
- Occupations: Film director, producer and screenwriter
- Years active: 1967–2023
- Spouse: Wilhelm Hein
- Website: birgithein.de

Birgit Hein (6 August 1942 – 23 February 2023) was a German film director, producer, performance artist, university professor, and screenwriter who has made experimental films since 1960s, with her then husband Wilhelm Hein.

== Biography ==
Hein was born in Berlin in 1942. With her structural films (since 1966), performances, documentary film essays and film study publications, she is considered one of the decisive pioneers of German underground and experimental films. In 1964, she married Wilhelm Hein (Separated in 1988, divorced in 1995), with whom she collaborated on several experimental film projects. In 1968, she co-founded XSCREEN, an exhibition space in Cologne. In 1993, Hein won the German Film Critics Association Best Experimental Film Award for her film Die Unheimlichen Frauen.

Hein studied art history and theater studies at the University of Cologne in the early 1960s. From 1966 to 1988 she worked with Wilhelm Hein producing films and working on performances with him. She was represented with two film works, together with Wilhelm Hein within Documenta V in Kassel in 1972, a worldwide exhibition of influential art after World War II. Their combined work was presented in different retrospectives, e.g. in the Anthology Archives, New York (1974), in the Filmmuseum Frankfurt (1985) as well as in Cologne (1988) and in Copenhagen (1989). In the 1970s they organized and curated several exhibitions on experimental film, e.g. Art Remains Art (Cologne 1974), Film As Film (Cologne, Berlin, Essen, Stuttgart 1977) and Film As Film (London 1979). For the Goethe-Institut they toured in Pakistan, Bangladesh and India (1987) and took part in the International Experimental Film Congress Toronto (1989).

In Cologne she was art founder of XScreen for subculture performances and program work for diverse cinemas. In the 1970s, she taught film art assignments at various universities (including the Cologne factory schools). She undertook a number of important curatorial projects, including the groundbreaking film section at Documenta VI. From 1990 until her retirement in 2007, Hein was professor of film and video at the Braunschweig University of Art.

Many premieres of her films at the Forum des Junge Films, Berlin Film Festival (1986, 1992, 1995) as well as television broadcasts (e.g. Baby, I Will Make You Sweat, 1997) and acquisitions of film collections (e.g. Musée d'Art Moderne - Center Pompidou, 1999). She has had several exhibitions of her works, e.g. Montreal 2000, Rotterdam 2000, Madrid 2002 and the Arsenal Berlin 2003.

Since 2007 she has been a member of the Akademie der Künste Berlin, and since 2012 she has been deputy director of the visual arts section.

== Filmography ==
- 1967: S & W
- 1968: Rohfilm
- 1969: 625, 16 mm, 34 Min
- 1978–82: Superman und Wonderwoman, Filmperformance
- 1982: Love Stinks
- 1986: Verbotene Bilder, 16 mm, 87 Min
- 1986: Washing of The Feet (episode) in Jesus – Der Film
- 1987–88: Die Kali-Filme, 16 mm, 70 Min
- 1992: Die Unheimlichen Frauen
- 1995: Baby, I Will Make You Sweat
- 1997: Eintagsfliegen, Video, 24 Min
- 2000: La Moderna poesia
- 2006: Kriegsbilder, Video, 10 Min
- 2013: Abstrakter Film, Video, 10 Min
