= Monika Fleischmann =

German research artist, digital media scientist and curator

Monika Fleischmann (born 1950 in Karlsruhe, Germany) is a German research artist, digital media scientist, and curator of new media art working in art, science, and technology. Since the mid-1980s she has been working collaboratively with the architect Wolfgang Strauss. As part of their research in New Media Art, Architecture, Interface Design and Art Theory, they focus on the concept of Mixed Reality, which connects the physical with the virtual world.

== Education ==
In 1966–68, Monika studied fashion design at the Zürich Fashion School. From 1976 to 1982 she studied Visual Art/Aesthetic Education and Stage/Theater Pedagogy at the Hochschule der Künste (HdK) in Berlin and at the Pädagogische Hochschule and at the Institute for Stage and Theater Pedagogy, Berlin. In 1984/86 she received the diploma for Visual Arts Teachers (Staatsexamen) from today's UDK Berlin – Universität der Künste Berlin.

== Career ==
Monika Fleischman is an artist and professor in media art. In 1997, Fleischman co-founded the platform netzspannung.org alongside her partner Wolfgang Strauss. This platform, serves as a hub for media art and education. Their collaborative efforts span a duration encompassing works dating back to 1985. Fleischman and Strauss also played pivotal roles as founders of ART+COM Berlin, a prominent institution known for its notable project "The Billion Dollar Code." Additionally, they were integral in establishing the MARS-Exploratory Media Lab and the eCulture Factory at Fraunhofer Research, demonstrating their commitment to pushing the boundaries of media-related endeavors.

Fleischman held the position of Honorary Professor at Hochschule Bremen, specifically within the Faculty of Electrical Engineering and Computer Science. Her involvement in the Digitale Medien Bremen program, situated at the University of Bremen and the Hochschule für Künste Bremen, is within the convergence of technology, theory, and artistic design. From 2001-2014, Fleischman assumed the role of Head of Department at the Fraunhofer Institute Centre Schloss Birlinghoven, located in Sankt Augustin, Germany. During this time, she led the MARS Exploratory Media Lab, guiding pioneering initiatives in the realm of media exploration.

== Awards and honors ==
In 1992, together with her partner Wolfgang Strauss, she received the Golden Nica of the Prix Ars Electronica in Linz, Austria for Home of the Brain (1990/1992), the first artistic virtual reality installation. She is the recipient of the 2018 ACM SIGGRAPH Distinguished Artist Award for Lifetime Achievement in Digital Art and was elected to the SIGGRAPH Academy as a research artist that has contributed to the field of interactive media art since the 1980s to the present day.

1992 Golden Nica in the Interactive Art category for "Home of the Brain" of the Prix Ars Electronica, Linz, Austria;

1993 Nominated for the UNESCO prize '92, Paris, France;

1995 Sparky Award in the Interactive Media Festival, Los Angeles, California;

1996 Main prize in the Female Artists in North Rhine-Westphalia;

1997 Recommendatory Prize in the "ARTEC '97," the 5th International Biennale in Nagoya, Japan for "Liquid Views";

2000/01 TIME magazine ranks Monika Fleischmann among the People to Watch;

2002 the Fraunhofer IMK – MARS Exploratory Media Lab is internationally recognized as one of the leading 14 Art & Technology Labs;

2002–07 Member of the Supervisory Board of the Confederation of cultural events in Berlin GmbH [KBB];

2003–06 Member of the board of directors of the Fraunhofer Institute for Media Communication (IMK);

2007 US-Patent for PointScreen – Theremin inspired touchless technology, that takes in advance new cognitive models and bio-sensory interfaces;

2007 The Interactive Poster, the Semantic Map and the PointScreen are among the "ground-breaking ideas that" change our lives. Presented in 100 Products of the Future by Nobel Laureate TW Hänsch, Econ, Berlin;

== Major exhibitions ==
1987 "IFA – Internationale Funkausstellung," Deutsche Telekom, Berlin, Germany

1990 "Fleischmann – Strauss," Werkbund-Galerie, Berlin, Germany

1991 Architektur Forum, Zürich, Switzerland

1992 "Endo Nano – Ars Electronica," Linz

1993 "New Realities – Neue Wirklichkeiten II," Museum für Gestaltung, Zürich, Switzerland

1993 Liquid Waves in "Machine Culture – SIGGRAPH '93 Art Gallery," Anaheim, California

1994 "The Virtual Body – Revue Virtuelle," Centre National d'Art et de Culture Georges Pompidou, Paris, France

1995 "Interactive Media Festival," Los Angeles, California

1995 "La nuova Europa," Biennale Venice, Venice, Italy

1996 "Ich und Du," Museum für Gestaltung, Zürich, Switzerland

1997 "Deep Storage – Arsenale der Erinnerung," Haus der Kunst, Munich, Germany

1997 "ARTEC '97" – The 5th International Biennale, Nagoya City Art Museum, Nagoya, Japan

1998 Liquid Views – Rigid Waves in "SIGGRAPH '98 Art Gallery: Touchware," Orlando, Florida

== Publications ==
Strauss, Wolfgang, Fleischmann, Monika, Denzinger, Jochen, Groenegress, Christoph, Li, Yinlin (2003): Information Jukebox – A semi-public device for presenting multimedia information content. In Personal and Ubiquitous Computing, 7 (3) pp. 217–220.

Novak, Jasminko, Fleischmann, Monika, Strauss, Wolfgang, Wurst, Michael, Morik, Katharina, Kunz, Christoph, Ziegler, Jürgen (2003): Verbindung heterogener Experten-Communities durch die Entdeckung, Visualisierung und Nutzb. In: Szwillus, Gerd, Ziegler, Jürgen (eds.) Mensch and Computer 2003 September 7–10, 2003, Stuttgart, Germany.

Fleischmann, Monika, Strauss, Wolfgang (eds.) Proceedings of CAST01/Living in Mixed Realities, Conference on Artistic, Cultural and Scientific Aspects of Experimental Media Spaces 21-22. September 2001, Schloss Birlinghoven, Sankt Augustin, Germany.

Fleischmann, Monika, Strauss, Wolfgang (2001): Linking between real and virtual spaces: building the Mixed Reality stage environment. In: AUIC 2001 – 2nd Australasian User Interface Conference 29 January – 1 February 2001, Gold Coast, Queensland, Australia. pp. 29–33.
