= Walther von Hahn =

German linguist and computer scientist

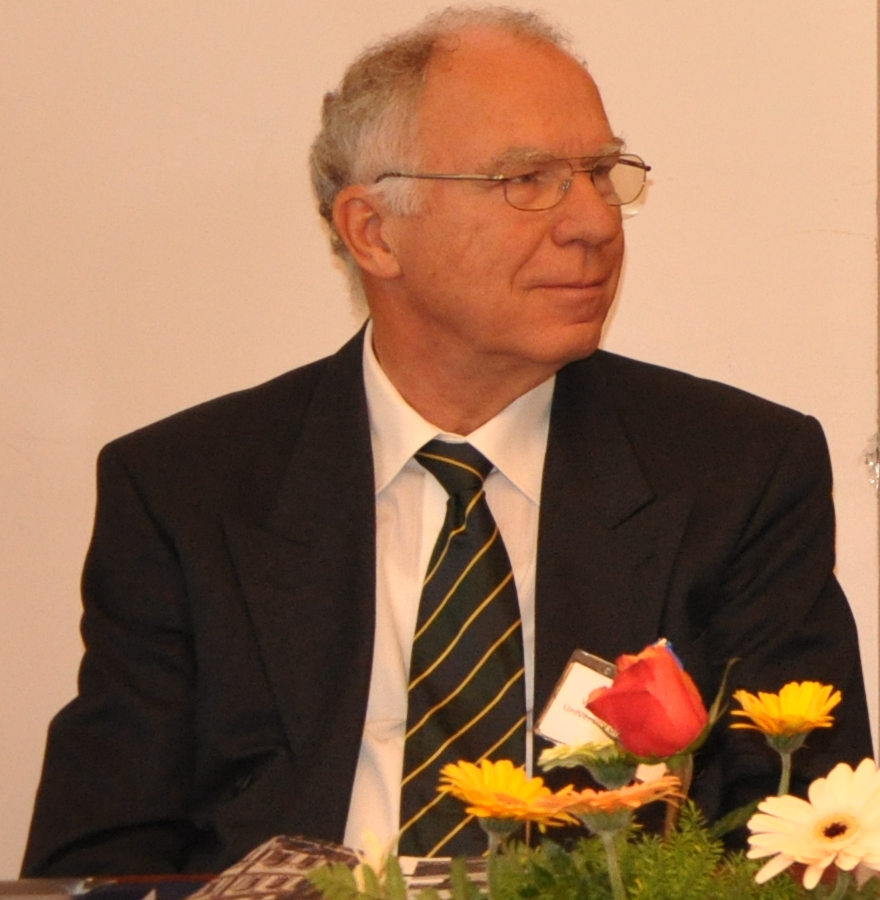
Walther v. Hahn

Walther von Hahn (born 26 April 1942 in Marburg/Lahn) is a German linguist and computer scientist. From 1977 to 2007, von Hahn taught Computer Science and Linguistics at Universität Hamburg.

== Education and career ==
Von Hahn studied German linguistics and literature, philosophy, and Latin and Protestant theology in Marburg/Lahn from 1962 to 1969. He received his PhD at the same university, with Prof. Dr. Ludwig Erich Schmitt. He moved to Hamburg University (Germany) where he gave seminars in German linguistics, becoming a faculty professor in 1977. At that time, research and teaching shifted to more formal fields in the German seminar thereat. In 1987 he was appointed a full professor in the computer science department. Since then, he has kept the right to teach in both departments. He was the founder of the Natural Language Systems Division (NatS).

== Research ==
=== Research fields ===
- Computational Linguistics: Morphology, Lexicography
- Artificial Intelligence: knowledge representation, machine (aided) translation
- Digital Humanities : data-modelling, vagueness and uncertainty representation in DH
- Specialized Language Communication

=== Major research projects ===
Following the lines of technical language research, von Hahn established (within German linguistics) the “HAM-RPM” project group (funding: German Science Foundation) and the Artificial Intelligence-centered group HAM-ANS (funding: Ministry of Research and Technology), which have been very influential in the German linguistic and AI communities. As member of the CS department, he initiated and managed a national preparatory project for speech-to-speech machine translation with broad industrial and academic cooperation and participated in the international follow-up research project VERBMOBIL.

From 1992 to 1998, von Hahn led the project DB(R)-MAT, the first major machine aided translation project involving languages in Central-Eastern Europe (Romanian and Bulgarian). The project is based on an innovative paradigm of linking multilingual lexical material onto a language independent ontology. In this way concepts were separated from their linguistic realization. This principle was applied in a European follow-up project "Language Technology foe eLearning" (LT4eL), in which he was involved (2005-2008)

From 2001 to 2003, he was the first director of the interdisciplinary group "Computerphioogie" at the University of Hamburg, one of the first initiatives in Digital Humanities in Germany, and initiated the first curriculum in this domain in Germany.

He is one of the main contributors to the development of computational linguistics and Digital Humanities at the University of Bucharest and constant promoter of the cooperation between the University of Hamburg and St-Kliment Ohrdiski University of Sofia, the University of Bucharest and Charles-University Prague

Since 2015, his research has been focused on computer modelling and the representation of vagueness in the digital humanities.

== Awards and honors ==
- 1984 the SEL research award “Technical Communication”
- 1998 the Jubilee Medal of the Charles University Prague, Prague Czech Republic
- 2002 Professor honors causa of the University "Alexandru Ioan Cuza" Iași, Romania
- 2012 Professor honors causa of the University of Bucharest, Bucharest, Romania

== Selected publications ==
- Walther v. Hahn and Cristina Vertan, "Vagueness-the neglected feature in big data", in Big Data in Social Sciences and Humanities, edited by CEFREEA -Bucharest
- Alptug Güney and Cristina Vertan and Walther v. Hahn, “Combining hermeneutic and computer based methods for investigating reliability of historical texts”, Proceedings of the “Twin Talks” workshop collocated with DHN 2019, Steven Krauver and Darja Fiser (Eds), University of Copenhagen 2018,
- Cristina Vertan and Walther v. Hahn, Making historical texts accessible to everybody, in Proceedings of Language Technology for Text Simplification, Workshop associated with Coling 2014, Orasan, Ct. and Osenova P and Vertan, C. (Eds.) Dublin 2014, pp. 64-70, ISBN 978-1-873769-42-3 6
- Cristina Vertan and Walther v. Hahn, Discovering and Explaining Knowledge in Historical Documents, in: Kristin Bjnadottir, Stewen Krauwer, Cristina Vertan and Martin Wyne (Eds.), Proceedings of the Workshop on “Language Technology for Historical Languages and Newspaper Archives” associated with LREC 2014, Reykjavik Mai 2014, pp. 76-80, ISBN 978-2-9517408-8-4
- Melania Duma and Mirela Duma and Walther v. Hahn and Cristina Vertan, Translation Technology for terminology in higher education, in Proceedings of the 19th European Symposium of Language for Special Purposes, Gerhard Budin and Vesna Lušicky (Eds.) Vienna, Austria, July 2014, pp. 220-227, ISBN 978-3-200-03674-1
- Walther v. Hahn, Cristina Vertan (Eds.): Specialised Languages in Global Commpunication. Frankfurt, (Proceedings der LSP 2008). Peter Lang 2010, ISBN 9783631584804
- Walther v. Hahn, Monica Gavrila, Cristina Vertan, Same Domain, Different Discourse Style. A Case Study on Language Resources for Data-driven Machine Translation, in: Proceedings of the Eighth International Conference on Language Resources and Evaluation (LREC'12). ,21-27.May 2012, Istanbul, Turkey.
- Walther v. Hahn, Monica Gavrila and Cristina Vertan, ProLiV – Learning Terminology with Animated Models for Visualizing Complex Linguistic Theories, in „Specialised Languages in Global Commpunication“, v. Hahn, W. and Vertan, C. (Eds.), Peter Lang 2010.
- Walther v. Hahn, Cristina Vertan, Challenges for the Multilingual Semantic Web, in Proceedings of the International MT Summit X 2005, Phuket, Thailand.
- Walther v. Hahn, Cristina Vertan, Specification and Evaluation of Machine Translation Toy Systems - Criteria for Laboratory Assignment,. in Proceedings of MT Summit IX Workshop on Teaching Translation Technologies and Tools, New Orleans, USA,
- Walther v. Hahn, Putting together the Parts: Complex Artificial Intelligence Systems, in: Proceedings of Eighth Ireland Conference on AI (AI-97) Volume 2. Londonderry 1997
- Walther v. Hahn, Galia Angelova, Combining Terminology, Lexical Semantics and Knowledge Representation in Machine Aided Translation,. in: Christian Galinski & Klaus-Dirk Schmitz (eds.) TKE'96, Terminology and Knowledge Engineering. Frankfurt1996.
- Walther v. Hahn, The Project Verbmobil. Mobile speech-to-speech translation, in Proceedings IJCAI Chambéry 1993
- Walther v. Hahn, Architectures as a Key Issue for Speech Understanding. in: E.Klein and F.Veltman (eds.): Natural Language and Speech. ESPRIT Symposium Procs Brussels November, 1991
- Walther v. Hahn, Hands-on Training and Language Engineering. In: Colloque "Problematique 1995" Salon International des Industries de la Langue. Actes des Conferences. Paris: OFIL 1991
- Walther v. Hahn, Three Ways of Cognitive Modelling in Knowledge Based Language Processing. In: Aplikace Umlé Intelligence AI´91. Prag 1991
- Walther v. Hahn, The Natural Language System Ham-ANS. In: Shapiro (Ed.) Encyclopedia of AI. 2. Edition 1991
- Walther v. Hahn, Artificial Intelligence and Natural Language Understanding, in: Proceedings Symposium "Les Etats Generaux des Langues" Paris 1990.
- Walther v. Hahn, The Paradigms of Natural Language Dialogue Research in AI, in: Proceedings of the ATR Conference Kyoto1989
- Walther v. Hahn, LSP and Computer Application: New Fields of Activity for LSP-Research and Development, in: Chr. Laurén und M. Nordmann, Special Language: From Human Thinking to Thinking Machines. Philadelphia 1989.
- Walther v. Hahn, Transparence and User-friendliness of Expert Systems, in: Th. Bernold and Hillenkamp (Eds.), Expert Systems in Production and Services. Amsterdam 1988.
- Walther v. Hahn, LOKI - A Logic Oriented Approach to Knowledge and Data Bases Supporting a Natural User Interaction, in: W. Brauer und W. Wahlster (Ed.), Wissensbasierte Systeme. Proceedings 2. Internationaler GI-Kongress. München 1987.
- Walther v. Hahn, Pragmatic Considerations in Man-Machine Discourse. Invited Lecture, in Proceedings 11th International Conference on Computational Linguistics. Bonn 1986
- Walther v. Hahn, Wolfgang Hoeppner and Wolfgng Wahlster, Das natürlich-sprachliche Dialog-Simulationssystem HAM-RPM. Dokumentation der Projektunterlagen. 2720 pages. Regensburg 1985. (Microfiche-Edition)
- Walther v. Hahn, Künstliche Intelligenz. Stuttgart 1985.
- Walther v. Hahn, Coerenza nel dialogo in sistemi di intelligenza artificiale per l´ analisi del linguaggio naturale, in: Ricerche di Psicologia 25 (1983) Milano.
- Walther v. Hahn, Fachkommunikation. Entwicklung, linguistische Konzepte, betriebliche Beispiele. Berlin 1983
- Walther v. Hahn, Computational Linguistics. AILA - Review. 1981.
- Walther v. Hahn, Wolfgang Hoeppner, Anthony Jameson and Wolfgang Wahlster, The Anatomy of the Natural Language Dialogue System HAM-RPM. in: Bolc, L. (Ed.): Natural Language Based Computer Systems. München 1979.
- Walther v. Hahn, Anthony Jameson and Wolfgang Hoeppner and Wolfgang Wahlster: HAM-RPM: Natural Dialogues with an Artificial Partner, in: Proceedings of the AISB/GI Conference Hamburg 1978.
- Walther v. Hahn, Report on the HAM-Group, in: ALLC-Bulletin 5 1977.
- Walther v. Hahn, Die Fachsprache der Textilindustrie im 17. und 18. Jahrhundert. Düsseldorf 1971.
