= Katharina Morik =

German computer scientist

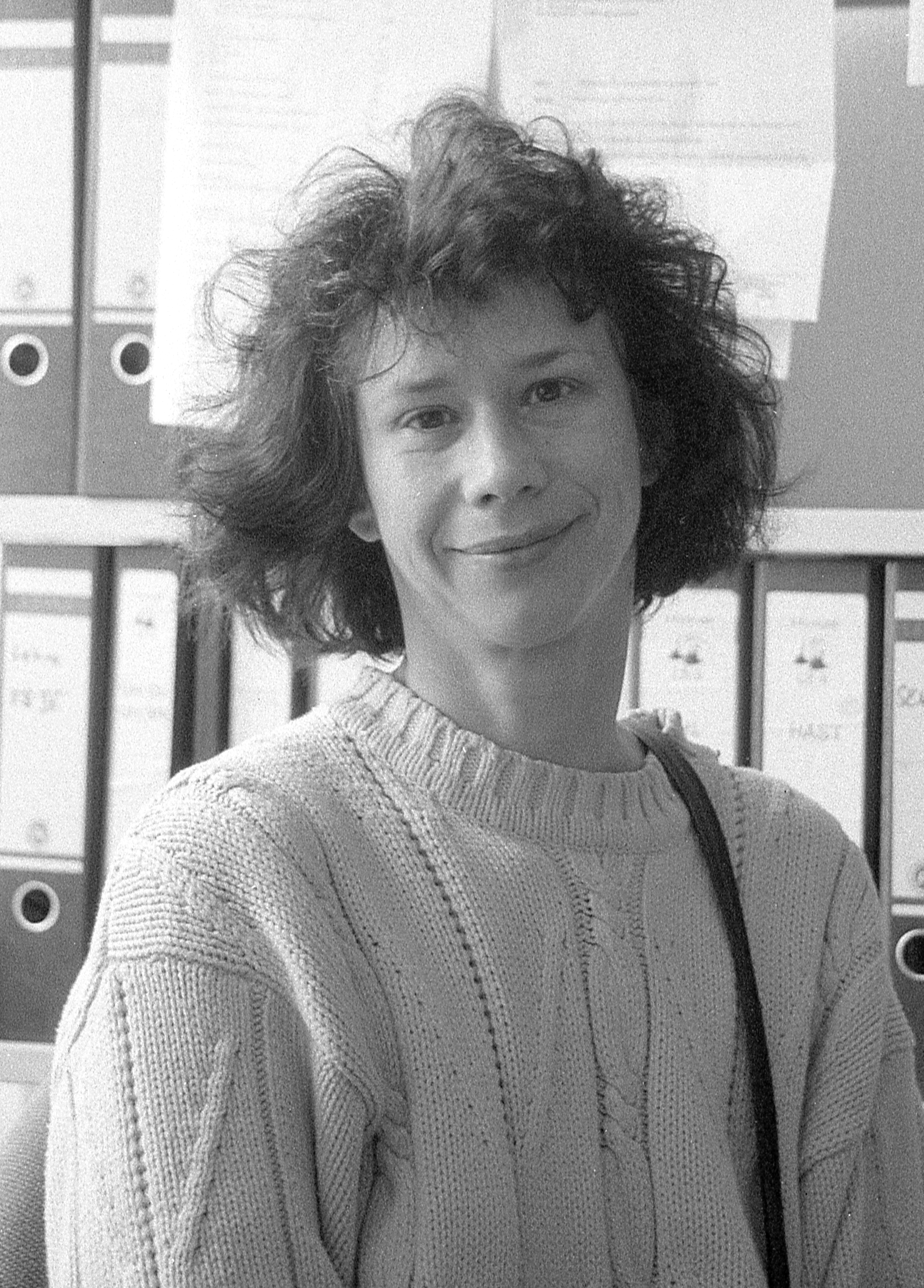
Morik in 1995

Katharina Morik (born 1956) is a retired German computer scientist specializing in machine learning and data mining, focusing on green computing in machine learning. She is the former chair for artificial intelligence at the TU Dortmund University.

== Education and career ==
Morik completed a doctorate (Dr. rer. nat.) in 1981 at the University of Hamburg, with the dissertation Validierung von Überzeugungssystemen der künstlichen Intelligenz vor dem Hintergrund linguistischer Theorien über implizite Äußerungen supervised by Walther von Hahn.

After habilitating at Technische Universität Berlin in 1988, she became the founding chair of artificial intelligence at the TU Dortmund University in 1991. She retired in 2023.

== Recognition ==
Morik was named to acatech, the German National Academy of Science and Engineering, in 2015. She has been a member of the North Rhine-Westphalian Academy of Sciences, Humanities and the Arts since 2016. In 2019 she was elected as a fellow of the German Informatics Society.
