= Martin Rieser =

Martin Rieser is Professor of Digital Creativity in the Institute of Creative Technologies, in De Montfort University, Leicester.

== Background ==
Joint research Professor between the Institute of Creative Technologies and the Faculty of Art and Design at De Montfort University, his track record as a researcher and practitioner in digital arts stretches back to the early 1980s. Originally a graduate of English literature and philosophy from Bristol University, he subsequently studied printmaking at Atelier 17 in Paris with Stanley William Hayter and then at Goldsmiths, where he also developed an abiding interest in photography. From such an already hybrid background, he moved into computer arts, establishing the first postgraduate course in the discipline in London in 1982.

== Curation ==
He has experience of curation and judging through a number of other international exhibitions in electronic art, including The Electronic Eye European Digital Art at Watershed 1986, the first International survey exhibition of Digital Printmaking: The Electronic Print, Arnolfini in Bristol 1989. Arcade 2- 1997, Arcade 3 2000, He helped to make a successful lottery bid to fund a national digital arts initiative Imag@nation subsequently transformed into DA2: an arts initiative promoting digital art practice nationally, and internationally.
