= Ostfalia University of Applied Sciences =

Coordinates: 52°10′36″N 10°32′55″E

Logo

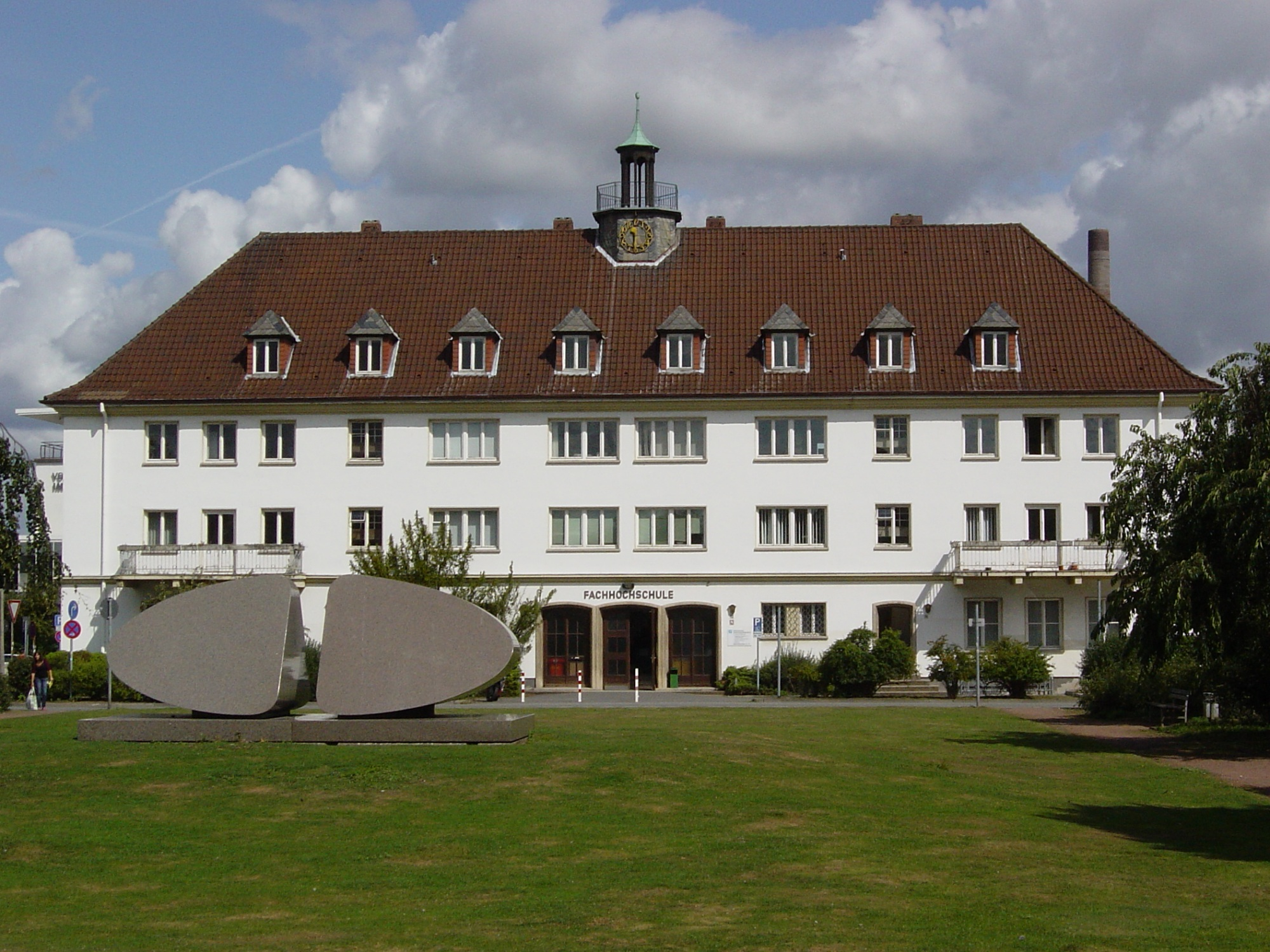
Campus Wolfsburg

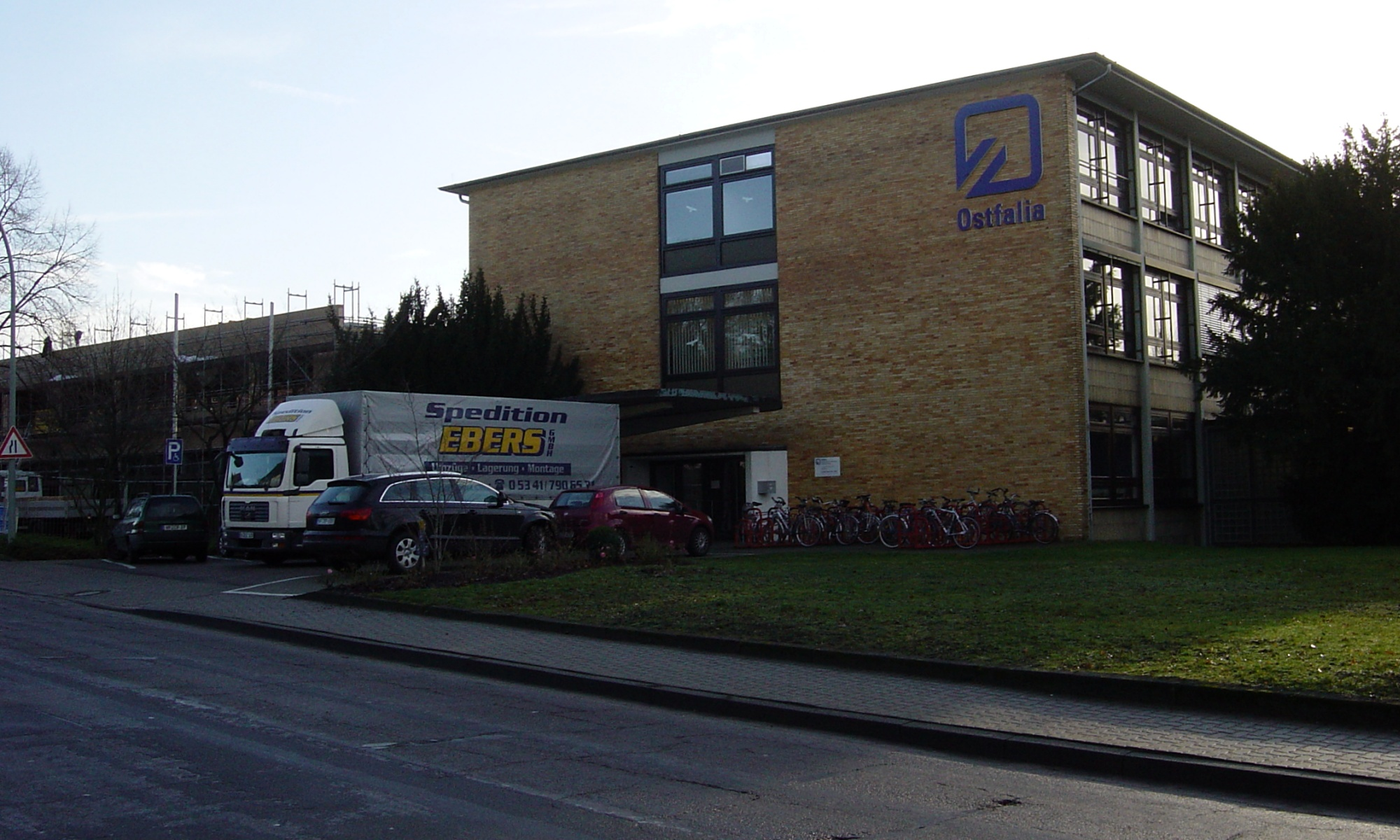
Campus Wolfenbüttel

Ostfalia Hochschule für angewandte Wissenschaften (German for "Eastphalia University of Applied Sciences", known as Fachhochschule Braunschweig/Wolfenbüttel until 2009), is a Fachhochschule in eastern Lower Saxony, Germany. The predecessor of the college, Staatliche Ingenieurschule Wolfenbüttel (State Engineering School Wolfenbuettel), was founded in 1928. It merged with two other independent institutions in August 1971.

It has campuses at:

- Salzgitter (SZ)
- Wolfenbüttel (WF)
- Wolfsburg (WOB)
- Suderburg (UE)

== History ==
The campus in Suderburg was transferred in 2009 from the University of Lüneburg to the Fachhochschule Braunschweig/Wolfenbüttel. The former campus in Braunschweig was relocated to Wolfenbüttel in 2010.

== Notable people ==
=== Faculty ===
- Martina Hasseler, professor of health and nursing sciences.
- Reza Asghari, professor of High-Tech Innovation and Entrepreneurship.
- Harald Rau, professor of communication management.
