= Cowboys & Aliens =

2011 film by Jon Favreau

- Theatrical release poster
- Directed by: Jon Favreau
- Screenplay by: Roberto Orci; Alex Kurtzman; Damon Lindelof; Mark Fergus Hawk Ostby
- Story by: Mark Fergus; Hawk Ostby; Steve Oedekerk
- Based on: Cowboys & Aliens by Scott Mitchell Rosenberg
- Produced by: Brian Grazer; Ron Howard; Alex Kurtzman; Roberto Orci; Scott Mitchell Rosenberg
- Starring: Daniel Craig; Harrison Ford; Olivia Wilde; Sam Rockwell; Adam Beach; Paul Dano; Noah Ringer
- Cinematography: Matthew Libatique
- Edited by: Dan Lebental
- Music by: Harry Gregson-Williams
- Production companies: Universal Pictures; DreamWorks Pictures; Reliance Entertainment; Relativity Media; Imagine Entertainment; Kurtzman/Orci Paper Products; Fairview Entertainment; Platinum Studios
- Distributed by: Universal Pictures (United States and Canada); Paramount Pictures (International)
- Release dates: July 23, 2011 (San Diego Comic-Con); July 29, 2011 (United States)
- Running time: 118 minutes
- Country: United States
- Language: English
- Budget: $163 million
- Box office: $175 million

Cowboys & Aliens is a 2011 American science fiction Western film directed by Jon Favreau and starring Daniel Craig, Harrison Ford, Olivia Wilde, Sam Rockwell, Adam Beach, Paul Dano, and Noah Ringer. The film is based on the 2006 Platinum Studios graphic novel of the same name created by Scott Mitchell Rosenberg. Set in the Southwestern United States in a retro-futuristic version of the 1870s, the film follows an amnesiac outlaw (Craig), a wealthy powerful cattleman (Ford) and a mysterious woman (Wilde) who must ally to save a group of townspeople who have been kidnapped by aliens.

The screenplay was written by Roberto Orci, Alex Kurtzman, Damon Lindelof, Mark Fergus and Hawk Ostby, based on a screen story by the latter two along with Steve Oedekerk. The film was produced by Brian Grazer, Ron Howard, Kurtzman, Orci, and Rosenberg, with Steven Spielberg and Favreau serving as executive producers.

The project began development in April 1997, when Universal Pictures and DreamWorks Pictures bought film rights to a concept pitched by Rosenberg which he described as a graphic novel in development. After the graphic novel was published in 2006, development on the film was begun again, and Favreau signed on as director in September 2009. On a budget of $163 million, filming for Cowboys & Aliens began in June 2010, in New Mexico and California. Despite studio pressure to release the film in 3-D, Favreau chose to film traditionally and in anamorphic format (widescreen picture on standard 35 mm film) to further a "classic movie feel". Measures were taken to maintain a serious Western element despite the film's "inherently comic" title and premise. The film's aliens were designed to be "cool and captivating", with some details, such as a fungus that grows on their wounds, created to depict the creatures as frontiersmen facing adversity in an unfamiliar place.

Cowboys & Aliens premiered at the 2011 San Diego Comic-Con and was released theatrically in the United States and Canada by Universal Pictures on July 29 and almost everywhere in the coming weeks by Paramount Pictures. The film underperformed at the box office, earning $175 million on a $163 million budget and resulted in a $75-80 million loss for both Universal and DreamWorks. Cowboys & Aliens received mixed reviews, with critics generally praising its acting and special effects, but criticizing the screenplay and tone. The film is also Ringer's second and final performance to date.

== Plot ==
In 1873 New Mexico Territory, a man awakens injured in the desert with a strange metal bracelet attached to his left wrist and no memory. He wanders into the town of Absolution, where preacher Meacham treats his wound. Sheriff John Taggart recognizes the stranger as an outlaw named Jake Lonergan; Jake resists arrest, but a mysterious woman named Ella Swenson interferes. Taggart and his men prepare to transport both Jake and petulant young drunkard Percy Dolarhyde to Santa Fe for trial. Percy's father, Colonel Woodrow Dolarhyde, a wealthy, powerful cattleman, arrives with armed men, demanding that Percy be released and that Jake, who has stolen gold from him, be handed over. During the standoff, alien ships begin attacking the town. Percy, Taggart, and other townsfolk are abducted by grappling cables fired from the ships. Jake's bracelet activates and transforms into a weapon, which he uses to shoot down a ship, ending the attack.

Dolarhyde, Ella, and other townsfolk form a posse to track an injured alien that escaped from the downed ship. Meanwhile, Jake travels to an abandoned cabin and, in a flashback, recalls returning there with stolen gold, only to be abducted, along with his lover Alice, by the aliens. As his memories return, Jake joins the posse. During the evening, they come upon a capsized paddle wheel steamboat that the aliens apparently dumped far from any large river. They camp inside it; during the night, the alien kills Meacham, who sacrifices himself to save Emmett, Taggart's grandson.

By morning, most of the posse have deserted, and Jake's former gang attacks the rest. Jake, who stole the gang's loot after their last heist, unsuccessfully attempts to retake control. The aliens attack again and abduct Ella. Jake jumps aboard the ship and attacks the alien pilot, causing the ship to crash into a river. The pilot survives the crash and attacks Ella, fatally wounding her, before Jake kills it with his wrist-blaster.

The remaining posse is captured by Chiricahua Apache Native Americans, who blame them for the alien attacks. After Ella's corpse is dumped on a fire by a Chiricahua warrior, she is resurrected and emerges from the fire. Ella reveals herself to be from another alien race, who had traveled to Earth for revenge after the invaders destroyed her home world. The aliens – who are nothing but lowly space pirates out to mine Earth's gold and abduct people to conduct experiments on them – have superior weaponry and are far stronger and more durable than humans; only Jake's wrist weapon or a well-aimed round from a rifle can kill them with a single shot. Ella tells them that the previous attackers were just scouts. She also claims Jake holds the secret to the aliens' whereabouts and argues that they must defeat the aliens before the invaders exterminate all life on Earth. After taking the medicine offered by the Apaches' medicine man, Jake's memory returns. He recalls watching Alice get vivisected and euthanized; he escaped by stealing the bracelet encasing his wrist. He also remembers the location of the aliens' base of operations: their landed mother ship.

With this knowledge, they plan to attack the alien base. Jake leaves to persuade his old gang to join the fight while Dolarhyde takes command of the original group and the Apaches. After the combined groups maneuver the aliens into a ground battle, Jake and Ella board the ship and free the captives, but Jake is captured. Dolarhyde rescues him, and both men escape from the ship after killing the alien responsible for Alice's death (identified by Jake, who left a distinctive scar on its eye in his original escape). The ship takes off as the remaining aliens flee Earth, but Ella stays on board to end the threat: she sacrifices herself by entering the ship's core and detonating Jake's wrist weapon, obliterating the ship.

With the aliens gone, the rescued townsfolk begin remembering their pasts. The citizens intend to rebuild their town with the gold mine discovered by the aliens. Although he is willing to turn himself in for being a wanted man, the sheriff and Dolarhyde decide to claim Jake was killed in the invasion. Jake leaves the town.

== Cast ==
- Daniel Craig as Jake Lonergan, an amnesiac outlaw
- Harrison Ford as Woodrow Dolarhyde, a powerful cattleman
- Olivia Wilde as Ella Swenson, an alien traveler who aids Lonergan
- Sam Rockwell as Doc, a doctor and owner of Absolution's saloon
- Adam Beach as Nat Colorado, Dolarhyde's Apache right-hand man
- Paul Dano as Percy Dolarhyde, Woodrow's son
- Noah Ringer as Emmett Taggart, Taggart's grandson
- Keith Carradine as Sheriff John Taggart
- Clancy Brown as Meacham, Absolution's preacher
- Walton Goggins as Hunt, a bandit friend of Lonergan
- Abigail Spencer as Alice Wills, Jake's lost love
- Ana de la Reguera as María, Doc's wife
- Raoul Trujillo as Black Knife, Chiricahua Apache chief
- David O'Hara as Pat Dolan, new leader of Lonergan's gang
- Wyatt Russell as Little Mickey

== Production ==
=== Development and casting ===
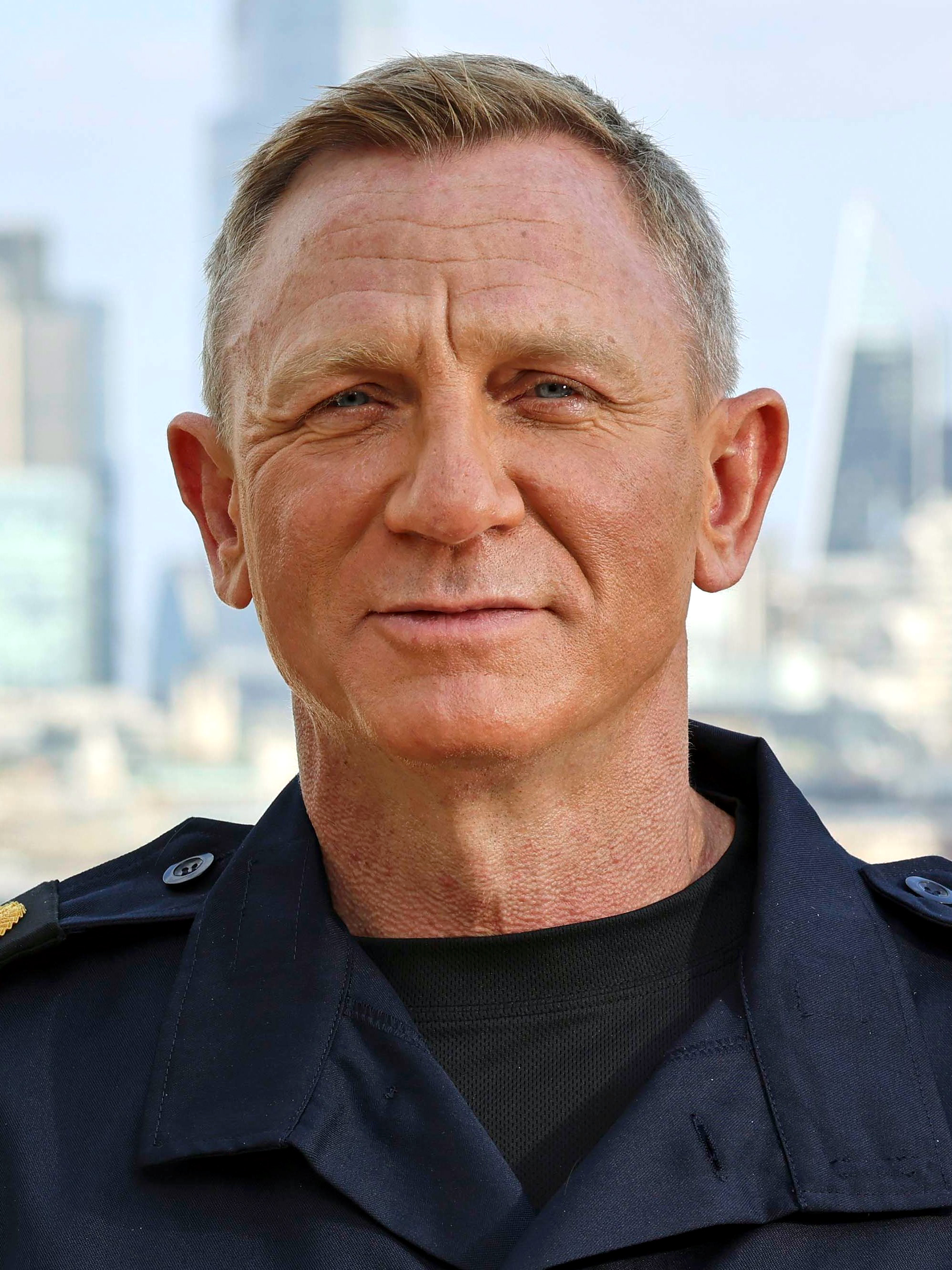
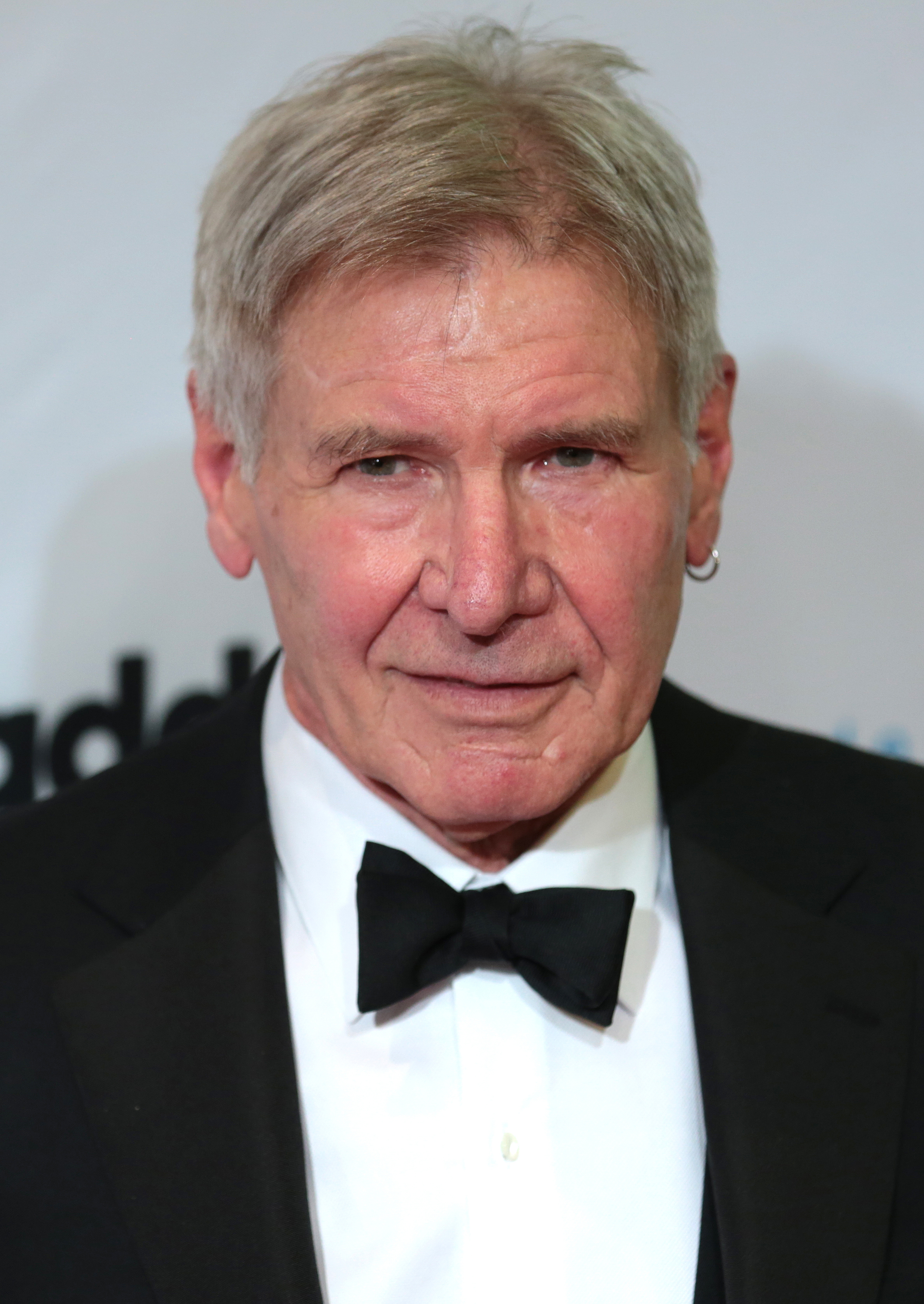
Daniel Craig and Harrison Ford portray two of the film's protagonists. Their casting has been described as a meeting between James Bond and Indiana Jones.

The project began development in 1997, when Universal Pictures and DreamWorks Pictures bought film rights to a concept pitched by Scott Mitchell Rosenberg, former president at Malibu Comics, which he described as a graphic novel in development. They hired Steve Oedekerk to write and direct the film, which Oedekerk planned to do after completing Nutty Professor II: The Klumps. Rosenberg, who formed Platinum Studios to pursue adapting Cowboys & Aliens and other Malibu Comics properties into film and television, joined as a producer. By 1998, Oedekerk left the project to pursue a remake of the 1964 film The Incredible Mr. Limpet with Jim Carrey. By 2004, the film rights were acquired by Columbia Pictures, who did not move the project beyond development.

In 2006, Rosenberg published Cowboys & Aliens as a graphic novel. In the following year, Universal and DreamWorks partnered again to adapt Cowboys & Aliens into a film. In June 2008, Robert Downey Jr. entered negotiations to star in the film as Zeke Jackson, a former Union Army gunslinger. While Downey was making Iron Man 2, he told director Jon Favreau about Cowboys & Aliens. Favreau investigated the project, and in September 2009, he joined as director. Downey left the project in January 2010, to star in Sherlock Holmes: A Game of Shadows, and later in the month, Daniel Craig was hired to replace him. Favreau said Craig's portrayal of James Bond "brings a certain virtuosity". He also described Craig, "On the one hand, he's like this Jason Bourne type, a leading man who's also a lethal character, but on the other hand, he's also got a lot of humanity and vulnerability to him."

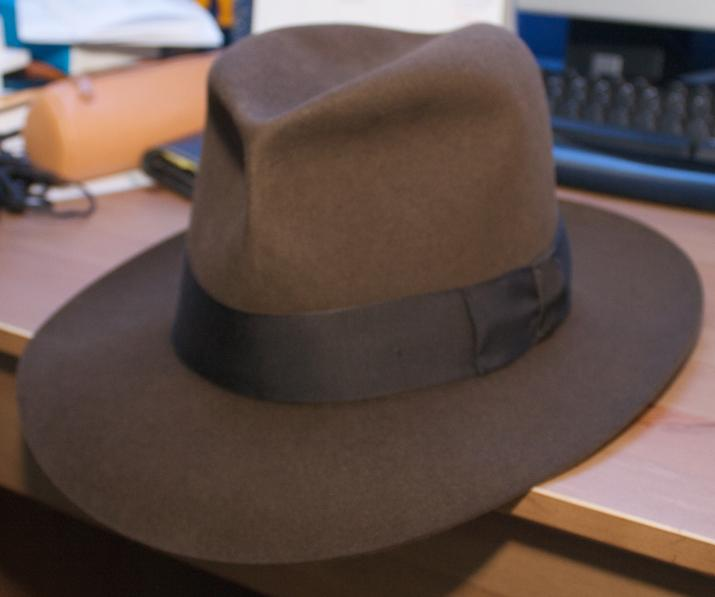
The type of fedora worn by Ford in the Indiana Jones films

In April 2010, Harrison Ford was cast alongside Craig. Favreau had cast Craig and Ford in the film because they were actors who suited the action-adventure roles so the characters would be less seen as comedic. The director compared Ford, in particular, with John Wayne in having "a sense of history" with the actor and the role. Before Cowboys & Aliens, Ford had previously acted in the Western films A Time for Killing (1967), Journey to Shiloh (1968) and The Frisco Kid (1979). As Ford is well known for playing Indiana Jones, the filmmakers wanted to avoid giving him a cowboy hat that would remind audiences too much of Jones. Writer Alex Kurtzman said, "We needed to make sure that—no pun intended—we tipped a hat to iconography of Harrison Ford and also presented the audience with a very different version."

Olivia Wilde was cast in one of the lead roles, and Favreau called Wilde's character the key to the film. Sam Rockwell was cast in a supporting role as Doc. The character was described as a large Mexican in the original script, but when Favreau and the writers learned of Rockwell's interest in the film, they reconceived and expanded the role. Glen Powell auditioned for the role of Percy, which eventually went to Paul Dano. Favreau himself is known for appearing in his films, but for Cowboys & Aliens, he chose not to make a cameo appearance because he thought it would affect the tone of the film. Favreau's face does appear on a wanted poster as "Todd Kravitz" in the scene establishing Craig as "Lonergan".

When asked about how the film was developing, Rosenberg stated, "It's incredible. Sometimes it's like seeing exactly what was going through my head when I first had that spark in my head as a kid. Jon Favreau's bringing his own talent and vision with the adaptation, but at the same time it remains true to what I was really trying to get at in the original story."

Steven Spielberg, one of the film's executive producers, visited Favreau and the writers during pre-production to look over the script and the artwork. He provided Favreau with a collection of classic Western films. Spielberg also invited the director and the writers to a private screening of several Western films and provided live commentary on how to make one properly. The films included Stagecoach, My Darling Clementine, and Destry Rides Again. Spielberg made several other suggestions: a main enemy alien, Jake's final use of the gauntlet being to decapitate an alien, and that Jake and Ella's first kiss should occur in the climax of the film.

=== Writing ===
In the film's period as a developing project under several studios, different versions of the screenplay were drafted by numerous screenwriters, beginning with Steve Oedekerk. Other screenwriters involved included David Hayter, Thomas Dean Donnelly, Joshua Oppenheimer, Jeffrey Boam, Thompson Evans and Chris Hauty. When Universal and DreamWorks re-partnered in 2007, they hired Mark Fergus and Hawk Ostby. In 2009, Ostby and Fergus were replaced by Alex Kurtzman, Roberto Orci and Damon Lindelof. Kurtzman and Orci analyzed American Western films including The Searchers. Orci said, "The first draft was very kind of jokey and broad and then it went very serious. You kind of swing back and forth between the two extremes and the tone until you find the exact right point where a Western and a sci-fi movie can really shake hands without it seeming unnatural." "Imagine you're watching Unforgiven and then Aliens land," Orci explained.

Orci also said, "The comic has the themes of enemies uniting to fight a common enemy and has the setting of that specific time period, so we kept the inspiration from all of that. In terms of the specifics of the story and who these characters are, we wanted the audience to be surprised and to not feel like they've already seen everything if they were fans of the comic. So, while the themes and the setting and many of the elements are a great inspiration, the story is completely adapted and translated for live action." The aliens were loosely based on the Anunnaki gods of Zecharia Sitchin's interpretation of the Babylonian religion, who have a distinct interest in gold.

=== Filming ===
Cowboys & Aliens was not originally planned to be shown in 3-D. When approached with the idea by DreamWorks, Favreau was not interested, stating that Westerns should be shot only on film (as opposed to being shot digitally, which is required for modern 3D technology), and didn't want it to be converted after filming. "That would be like filming in black and white and colorizing it," he reasoned. Director of photography Matthew Libatique shot Cowboys & Aliens in the anamorphic format on 35 mm film to further a "classic movie feel".

On a budget of $163 million, principal photography for Cowboys & Aliens began at Albuquerque Studios in New Mexico on June 30, 2010. One of the filming locations was Plaza Blanca, "The White Place", where Western films including The Missing, 3:10 to Yuma, City Slickers, Young Guns and The Legend of the Lone Ranger were filmed. Sound stage work took place in Los Angeles, with additional location shooting at Randsburg, California. Filming finished on September 30, 2010.

A scene in which Craig's character rides a horse alongside a ravine and jumps down it onto a spacecraft emulated many scenes in American Western films where cowboys rode along a moving train and jumped on it. Favreau said the scene referenced the one in the film Raiders of the Lost Ark (1981) where Indiana Jones chases a truck and noted that a similar scene existed in the film Stagecoach (1939), saying "We're constantly referencing back to our roots." Cowboys & Aliens also make multiple references to Close Encounters of the Third Kind, such as the introduction to the aliens through the bright lights on their aircraft and an upturned paddle steamer in the middle of the desert. The film also "tease[s]" monster movies, and the scenes in the paddle steamer were a deliberate homage to Alien.

During an appearance on the Armchair Expert in June 2026, Wilde stated that during filming of a riding sequence, she was thrown from her horse and was nearly trampled by the incoming riders. Walton Goggins prevented this by turning his horse sideways and having the riders hit into him instead.

=== Design and visual effects ===
Scott Chambliss was hired as the production designer based on his work on Star Trek, produced by Orci and Kurtzman. The visual effects and animation were created by Industrial Light & Magic (ILM), represented by Roger Guyett and Eddie Pasquarello as visual effects supervisors. Under the supervision of Shane Mahan, Legacy Effects created practical puppet aliens and full scale alien speeders. New Deal Studios constructed a miniature of the paddle steamer that is seen upturned in the film. Kerner Optical built a miniature of the alien ship and bluescreen stand-ins. The film also featured visual effects by Fuel VFX, The Embassy, Ghost, and Shade VFX, with previsualization from Halon Entertainment.

Favreau noted that Cowboys & Aliens focuses on a specific aspect of the alien genre which primarily revolves around the films of the 1980s: "And although we have quite a bit of CGI. I like the way they told stories before—before you could show everything with CGI. And it was a real unveiling of the creature, little by little, and using lighting and camera work and music to make it a very subjective experience. And so we tried to preserve that here." In designing the film's aliens, ILM was careful to make the creatures "cool and captivating". Guyett stated that they adopted a similar approach to that of District 9:

An alien with wounds covered in a yellow fungus. Details such as this were created to depict the creatures as frontiersmen facing adversity in an unfamiliar place.

The trick was to make [the aliens] interesting through their behavior and what happens to them, and that was something that District 9 did very well. You were drawn into their world a bit and their idiosyncrasies had an immediate impact: they ate cat food. But those details overwhelm certain design aspects, so I was striving to find some behavior that fit in well with the Western genre, where you have people in very arduous conditions fighting the elements. And I thought that the irony of all this was that the aliens turn up and it could be more exaggerated for them. They're frontiersmen in a way: traveling to another place and having to deal with all the adversities of the climate. And in our case, we played up the fact that they weren't comfortable in our world. There are flies all around them; they don't like the light; and when they were wounded and exposed, a strange fungus grows around them.

The use of anamorphic widescreen (rather than shooting full-frame "flat" and cropping later) gave ILM no extra room to re-frame shots; it was a challenge to show both nine-foot-tall aliens and smaller humans in the same space. Instead, Guyett said, they shot more areas in case portions of the shots were lost. In filming the gun battle between the cowboys and aliens, in which the aliens move at twice the speed of the humans, actors were required to ride through the scene on horseback and shoot at men in gray suits and three-foot-tall hats; they aimed at faces drawn by Jon Favreau on the top of the hats. A big challenge for ILM's texture artists was to show the aliens in both a dark cave environment and harsh sunlight. The creatures were rendered in high resolution for close-ups; dirt and wounds were added to the aliens to emphasize the injuries they sustained in battle. After Favreau requested that the aliens experience a very unpleasant biological reaction to being wounded on Earth, the texture team created a yellow fungus-like look on the scars of the aliens. To design the fungus, texture supervisor Martin Murphy searched the Internet for real pictures of mold and growth on trees and eventually designed a "fried egg pattern". The heads of the aliens were based on those of sea turtles, after Favreau encountered sea turtles during a trip to Hawaii.

At the suggestion of Steven Spielberg and Ron Howard, an "über-alien" was also designed. It was unclear if the red scar Jake gives the über-alien after escaping vivisection would be enough of an identifier to distinguish it from other aliens, so the creature was redesigned with translucent, pale skin due to the lack of time spent outside. Favreau described the über-alien as more fleshy and anthropomorphic than the other aliens and Murphy commented, "There are some parts of him like his arm that you can see into. It's almost like glass or ice or gelatiny surface that blends into a dryer area. The [sic] there's pieces of him that are more like a soft-shell crab or shiny and wet."

In addition to the aliens, other visual effects were required for the speeders, the alien spaceship, its interior, environment re-creations, and the head-up display for Jake's arm gauntlet. For the invasion of the town of Absolution, both practical laser lighting and fire effects were used, along with practical ships and effects enhancements. ILM artists had to enhance the initial look of the alien "bolos", the cables used to abduct people, with renderings such as extra lights, after viewers thought the studio had failed to "paint out" the cables in the film's first trailer. For a scene in which Jake and Ella ride on a speeder, the actors were filming on a practical mock-up against bluescreen; they were digitally replaced in wider shots.

=== Music ===
The score was composed and conducted by Harry Gregson-Williams and performed by the Hollywood Studio Symphony. The soundtrack was released under the Varèse Sarabande label on July 25, 2011.

== Themes ==
In Cowboys & Aliens, Director Jon Favreau sought a plausible approach to how humans from the late 19th century could confront extraterrestrial beings armed with advanced weaponry. He said, "It was very well laid out, well planned, and there were a lot of discussions with a lot of actors who called me to task on things that seemed too convenient, so we made sure we earned each step." The director also sought to maintain a Western tone as aliens appeared in the film, saying, "It's very easy to just cut the string and then all of a sudden the action starts and you're in Independence Day." Favreau cited the works of John Ford and Sergio Leone as sources of inspiration as well as Butch Cassidy and the Sundance Kid. Favreau also wanted the science-fiction element to stand on its own, referencing Alien, Predator, and Close Encounters of the Third Kind. He said of both genres, "It's about finding the intersection of those two genres . . . If you do it right, it honors both, and it becomes interesting and clever and a reinvention of two things that people understand the conventions of, instead of just a retread or remake or sequel or reboot of a film you've seen before."

In the Americas, Native American nations were severely damaged by European settlers, specifically because of the Europeans' more advanced military technology. Favreau compared the film to the historical confrontation "in the frustration of not having the technology to allow you to prevail. It's always the low-tech culture that feels powerless when faced with an enemy that has technology on their side." In the film, the cowboys are the low-tech culture, and the aliens with advanced technology possess the belief of Manifest Destiny. Favreau also said of the premise, "It allows the cowboys and Native Americans to come together, which would be impossible had there not been a greater common enemy. It sets the Western up in a very classic way and then turns it on its ear." When the aliens appear, the film becomes a road movie in which the main characters try to track the aliens, team up with different groups, and ultimately confront the aliens. Favreau compared the gathering to The Magnificent Seven in facing seemingly insurmountable odds in their confrontation.

The character of Meacham also presents an unconventional take on Christian principles to support the film's main theme of redemption. According to Favreau, Meacham's teaching Doc how to shoot not only references similar scenes in other Westerns but also "teach[es] him how to be a person". Meacham's dying words to Jake, "God don't care who you were, Son, only who you are", speaks of the central theme of redemption. The hummingbird that Jake sees at various points in the film is a "good spirit" that could represent either Alice or Ella; an alternate theory is that Ella was an angel that helped Jake "get over" Alice. Favreau also suggested a back-story to Cowboys & Aliens: the über-alien is the mastermind of the invasion; all other aliens are "worker bees", possibly genetically engineered by another species of aliens that remained on their home planet and sent the worker bees as conquistadors.

== Marketing ==
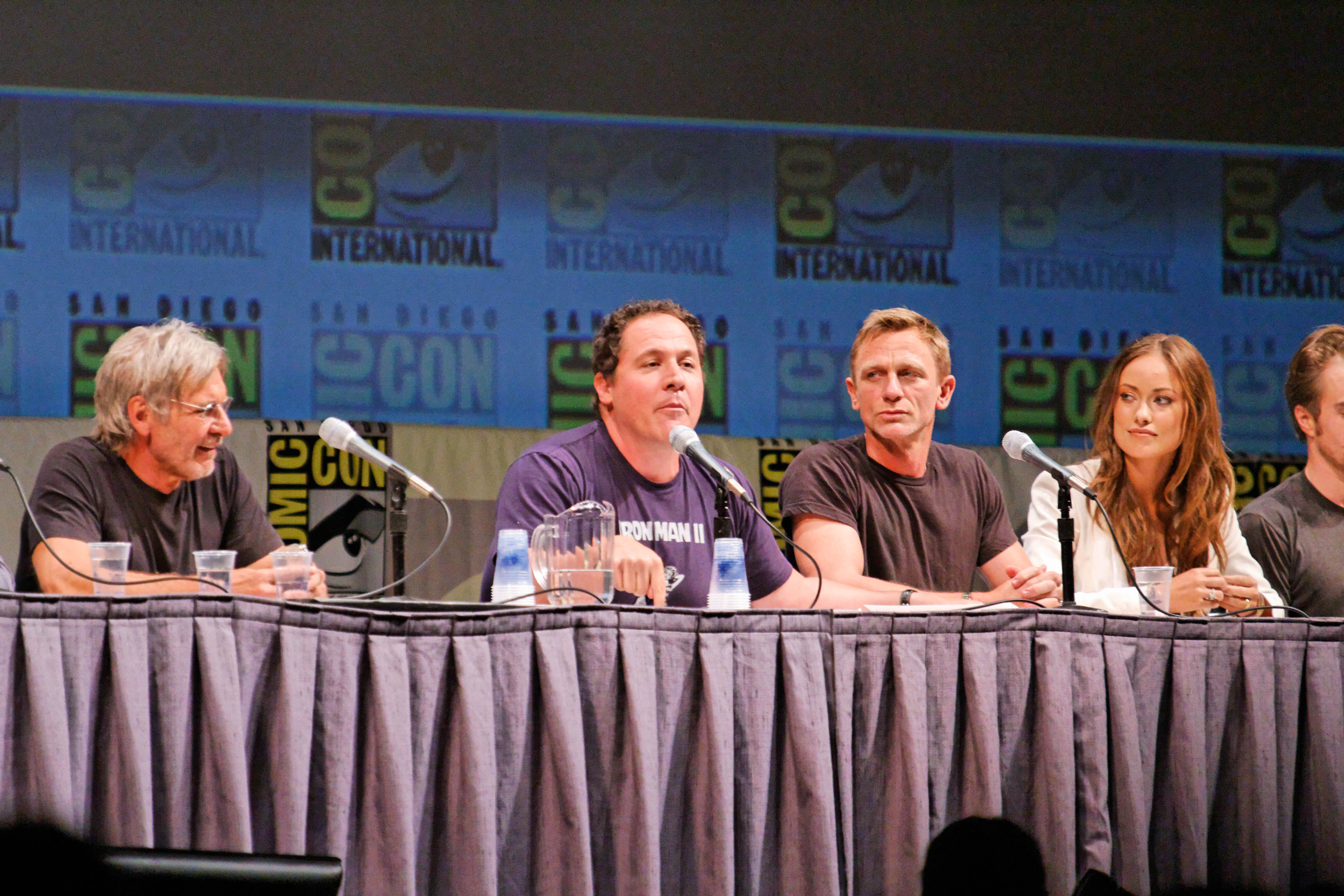
Harrison Ford, Jon Favreau, Daniel Craig and Olivia Wilde promoting the film at the 2010 San Diego Comic-Con

Cowboys & Aliens, which crosses genres with the American Western element of cowboys and the science-fiction element of extraterrestrials, has an "inherently comic" title and premise. At San Diego Comic-Con in July 2010, director Jon Favreau hosted a presentation and was accompanied by the film's primary cast members, including Harrison Ford in his first Comic-Con appearance. In the presentation, Favreau explained to audiences that he intended the film as a serious mix of the Western styles of Sergio Leone and John Ford and "really scary" science fiction like Alien and Predator. The first trailer for the film appeared in the following November, and The New York Times reported that film audiences found the premise comedic. Eddie Egan, the president of marketing at Universal Pictures, acknowledged the misconception and said, "The trailer is the first very public step in reconciling the tone of the movie with the more immediate effect of the title on its own." The studio anticipated a marketing campaign that would demonstrate that the film is "a tough-minded adventure" like Unforgiven by Clint Eastwood.

During Super Bowl XLV on February 6, 2011, the studio aired a TV spot for Cowboys & Aliens. Hours before the American football game, Favreau used Twitter to link followers to the spot online. Entertainment Weekly reported, "It . . . roused the geek-hive fan base and stirred new speculation about his hybrid of classic Westerns and extraterrestrial-invasion thrillers." After the spot aired, Favreau said the first trailer was intended as an introduction to pique people's curiosity and that the Super Bowl TV spot was "showing more of the sense of adventure as things unfold".

In April 2011, Favreau and Roberto Orci appeared at WonderCon in San Francisco, where they presented nine minutes of film footage and answered questions about the film. Favreau explained that marketing would show "only a brief glimpse of the aliens of the title" before the film is released. He explained the withholding of certain elements, "I think there are enough visionary people involved with this film that there is an understanding that there is a personality that the marketing campaign can take on as well as the film itself . . . I want to make sure that if the audience goes to see [the film], there is going to be a lot of surprises in it that they haven't seen in the marketing materials."

== Release ==
Cowboys & Aliens had its world premiere at San Diego Comic-Con on July 23, 2011. It was commercially released in the United States and Canada on July 29, 2011, and in other territories in ensuing weekends. Paramount Pictures also released the film in IMAX and 4DX theaters around the world, as it did for Favreau's previous film, Iron Man 2, while Reliance Entertainment released the movie in India.

Box Office Mojo forecast that Cowboys & Aliens would gross $95 million total in the United States and Canada. For the comparatively low figure, the website cited that the marketing had not contextualized the film effectively and that hybridized Western films like Jonah Hex and Wild Wild West were not successful at the box office. In territories outside the United States and Canada, the website forecast $140 million total, citing that American Western films are not historically popular, but that the premise of the alien invasion and the presence of international stars like Daniel Craig and Harrison Ford would generate interest. In contrast, box office tracker Paul Dergarabedian said the film's combination of cowboy and extraterrestrial themes in particular would attract audiences. Dergarabedian also believed that audiences' familiarity with Craig as character James Bond would help the film.

== Reception ==
=== Box office ===
On the opening day of Cowboys & Aliens, estimates showed that its opening day gross was $13.0 million and it came in second place to The Smurfs' opening day gross of $13.3 million. This was considered a surprise since Cowboys & Aliens was expected to be the clear winner for the weekend. Estimates then showed Cowboys & Aliens and The Smurfs tied at the #1 spot for the weekend with $36.2 million each. However, when the actual results for the weekend were announced, Cowboys & Aliens won the weekend with $36.4 million, just beating out The Smurfs, which grossed $35.6 million. The film grossed $100,240,551 in the U.S. and Canada (making it the 500th $100 million domestic movie) as well as $74,581,774 internationally, bringing its worldwide total to $174,822,325. With its high cost, the film was a financial disappointment, which not only resulted in both Universal and DreamWorks losing an estimated $75-80 million but also resulted in the film being added in the Los Angeles Times 2014 list of the most expensive box office flops of all time.

=== Critical response ===
On the review aggregator website Rotten Tomatoes, 44% of 256 critics' reviews are positive, with an average rating of 5.6/10. The website's consensus reads: "Daniel Craig and Harrison Ford are as dependably appealing as ever, but they're let down by director Jon Favreau's inability to smooth [the film's] jarring tonal shifts." Metacritic, which uses a weighted average, assigned the film a score of 50 out of 100, based on 41 critics, indicating "mixed or average" reviews. Audiences polled by CinemaScore gave the film an average grade of "B" on an A+ to F scale.

Kirk Honeycutt of The Hollywood Reporter praised the movie, saying, "It sounds kooky on paper but on the screen, Cowboys & Aliens make beautiful, fun music together." Honeycutt felt that the success of the film's blend of aliens and western themes was due to "the determination by everyone involved to play the damn thing straight. Even the slightest goofiness, the tiniest touch of camp, and the whole thing would blow sky high. But it doesn't." He criticized the aliens, which he said "don't rate as characters", existing as "moving blobs you shoot at in a video game." Variety's Peter Debruge echoed Honeycutt's sentiments that the "potential hamminess" of the premise is offset by the cast, particularly Craig, through a "mix of ruthlessness and sensitivity." He considered that Wilde had the opposite effect, stating that she "appears out of place among her grizzled co-stars". Debruge appreciated the attention paid to the roots of the two genres, saying "beneath all the state-of-the-art special effects beats an old-fashioned heart, one that prizes both of the genres in play" and concluded that "a canny blend of CG and practical effects serve the sci-fi elements well, while location shooting and Mary Zophres' form-fitting period duds make the West look its best." Nick Pinkerton of The Village Voice said the Western elements of the picture were "lovingly" handled but felt the science aspects were a "gimmick" and "much more standard fare" in comparison. He added that "Ford, enlivened by dude garb, seems to enjoy himself in front of a camera for the first time in decades".

Roger Ebert gave the film three stars out of four, writing that "as preposterous moneymakers go, it's ambitious and well-made. The acting from the large cast is of a high standard, Craig and Ford were more or less born into their roles, and director Jon Favreau actually develops his characters and gives them things to do, instead of posing them in front of special effects." He lamented that the film was not a pure Western, saying of the aliens, "[T]here is more genuine suspense when [Percy Dolarhyde] starts shooting up the town than when countless aliens appear". Salon's Andrew O'Hehir offered a mixed response, claiming the movie to be well made and clever, and singling out Craig and Ford for their performances. O'Hehir was critical of the combination of western and science-fiction elements, calling it "a mediocre western clumsily welded to a mediocre alien shoot-'em-up".

Slant's Nick Schager reacted negatively, stating "Cowboys & Aliens mashes up genres with a staunch dedication to getting everything wrong, making sure that each scene is more inane than the one that preceded it"; giving the film one star out of four. Schager continued, "Cowboys & Aliens's western accoutrements are [...] so false as to be stunning, with every steely-eyed glare from Craig's Man With No Memory, every confrontation between his Jake and Ford's grizzled Dolarhyde, and every silhouetted horseback ride across a sunset range seeming like a wan approximation of a familiar genre staple. [...] Favreau's visuals have an inauthentic and bland blockbuster sheen, and his actors are similarly afflicted with a case of poseur-itis (Craig's affected silent-type glowering, Ford's gruff racism, or Wilde's blank, wide-eyed stares), failing to deliver a single believable line-reading or gesture." John Patterson felt the film to be rushed, and lacking character development. Peter Bradshaw gave the film two out of five, criticising its rushed story and felt the aliens to be lacking development.

At the 2011 Savannah Film Festival, Ron Meyer (then-president of Universal Pictures), stated "Cowboys & Aliens wasn't good enough. Forget all the smart people involved in it, it wasn't good enough. All those little creatures bouncing around were crappy. I think it was a mediocre movie, and we all did a mediocre job with it."

=== Accolades ===
Cowboys & Aliens received five nominations. At the 39th Annie Awards, the film was nominated in Animated Effects in a Live Action Production for both Gary Wu and Lee Uren, but lost to Transformers: Dark of the Moon. The ceremony took place on February 4, 2011. The film received nominations from the Art Directors Guild for Fantasy Film, honoring production designer Scott Chambliss, and for Outstanding Performance by a Stunt Ensemble in a Motion Picture at the 18th Screen Actors Guild Awards, but lost to Harry Potter and the Deathly Hallows – Part 2 in both ceremonies. Ford received a Saturn Award nomination for Best Supporting Actor.

=== Home media ===
Cowboys & Aliens was released on DVD and Blu-ray Disc on December 6, 2011. The release includes an extended version of the film running 135 minutes, three behind-the-scenes featurettes, and feature commentary with director Jon Favreau.

In 2024, Kino Lorber released a 4K Blu-ray of the theatrical cut. The release includes Favreau's commentary, behind-the-scenes featurettes, TV spots, theatrical trailers and a HD Master of the Extended Cut.

=== Infringement lawsuit ===
On November 30, 2011, Steven John Busti filed a lawsuit against Universal, DreamWorks, Platinum Studios, and Scott Mitchell Rosenberg, claiming copyright infringement. Busti claimed he wrote a preview for his story Cowboys and Aliens in 1994, which was published in the April 1995 issue of Bizarre Fantasy #1. The story was also previewed in a 1995 issue of "Comic Shop News", which was on the same page that featured coverage of Scott Mitchell Rosenberg. Rosenberg and Platinum produced a one sheet depicting a cowboy being chased by an alien, which eventually led to Universal and DreamWorks buying film rights to their concept. The lawsuit was dismissed.

=== Historical legend ===
Although its name is not shown or mentioned, the capsized steamboat that appears in the film is presumed to be the Iron Mountain which, according to legend, steamed out of Vicksburg towing two barges. Two hours later, another boat found the barges adrift. The ship was not found until later, having apparently been refloated by flood waters and carried through a break in a levee, and grounded in a cotton field at Omega Landing, near Tallulah, Louisiana.

== See also ==
- Cowboys & Aliens (soundtrack)
- High Plains Invaders, a 2009 alien western film
