= Gunplay =

Gunplay may refer to:

== Arts and entertainment ==
- Gunplay (comics), a 2008 graphic novel by Jorge Vega and Dominic Vivona
- Gunplay (film), a 1951 American Western film
- Gunplay (rapper) (born 1979), American rapper
- "Gunplay", a song by Rick Ross from the 2009 album Deeper Than Rap
- Gun Play, a 1935 American Western film

== Firearms ==
- Gun fu, a style of sophisticated close-quarters gunfight resembling a martial arts combat that combines firearms with hand-to-hand combat and melee weapons
- Gunspinning, the act of a gunfighter twirling their handgun around their trigger finger
- Shooting, the act or process of discharging a projectile from a ranged weapon (such as a gun)
- Shootout, a confrontation in which parties armed with firearms exchange gunfire

== See also ==
- Gun (disambiguation)
