= Ro Salarian =

American cartoonist (born 1986)

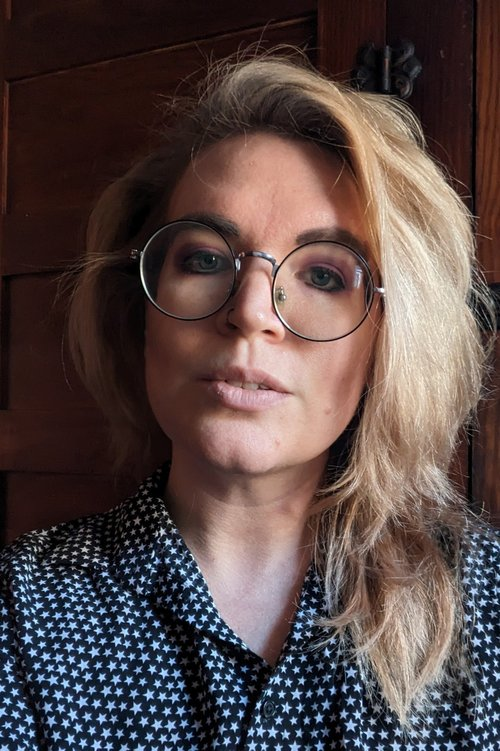
- Born: June 12, 1986 (age 40) Chicago, Illinois
- Areas: Artist, Writer, Publisher
- Pseudonyms: Anonymous Manga; Rosalarian
- Notable works: YU+ME:dream; I Was Kidnapped By Lesbian Pirates From Outer Space

Ro Salarian, formerly known as Megan Rose Gedris, (born June 12, 1986) is an American cartoonist, writer, and publisher whose comics include YU+ME:dream and I Was Kidnapped By Lesbian Pirates From Outer Space. They are commonly regarded for writing about the advancement of women, LGBTQIAP+, sex, and body-positivity within their work.

== Work ==
=== YU+ME:dream (2004–2010) ===
YU+ME:dream is a webcomic begun in 2004, using manga and other types of styles, about an 18-year-old girl named Fiona who spends all her time dreaming. At home, she lives with her father and stepmother, and while she is not at home, she frequently experiences bullying at the hands of her classmates at West Catholic High. Enter Lia: a new girl at school. Fiona is confused by Lia until she arrives at the realization that girls can be in love with girls. The two begin a secret relationship; however, while they are attending a school dance, Fiona discovers that the past few months have merely been a very long dream while she was in a coma. The remaining two-thirds of the story follow Fiona's attempts to return to Dreamworld, find Lia, and resume their relationship against the wishes of Sadako, Queen of Dreamworld. The Dreamworld sequences employ a number of different art styles, including collage and clay modeling, to portray different realms of the imaginary world. The webcomic won the second Queer Press Grant from Prism Comics which allowed Salarian to publish the first collected volume of the series.

Salarian writes, "So many stories (bad ones) end with '. . . and it was all a dream.' But I always wanted to know what would happen after that. How would this affect someone’s life." Therefore, the "it was all a dream" twist comes not at the end of the story, but one-third of the way through. According to Salarian, "I put my twists in the middle, rather than the end. . . . Instead of ending with it being a dream, we follow how things go after the dream ends."

=== Lesbian Pirates from Outer Space (2006– ) ===
Salarian' second webcomic, I Was Kidnapped By Lesbian Pirates from Outer Space (usually shortened to Lesbian Pirates from Outer Space or LPFOS), created in 2006, centers on Susan Bell, a secretary living in the 1950s who is kidnapped by a group of titular lesbian pirates. Lesbian Pirates from Outer Space follows the humorous and occasionally risqué situations that develop as Susan lives alongside them, and chronicles Susan's eventual realization that she too is homosexual. The lesbian pirates are a race of Amazonesque beings who come from a planet referred to as "Lesbos-1," named after the Greek island of Lesbos.

Salarian created the webcomic as an antidote to the portrayals of lesbians in the comics media. The webcomic is based on Cold War-era lesbian pulp novels. They entered the Platinum Comics Comic Book Challenge and were a finalist (first place going to D.J. Coffman for Hero by Night). As a result, Platinum Studios began publishing the webcomic via the Drunk Duck webcomics site; in May 2008, the first story arc was published in print. Prism Comics stated that the webcomic had "laugh out loud moments in every issue". The webcomic was one of the most popular titles on Drunk Duck since its debut.

In November 2013, Salarian took all 18 chapters of Lesbian Pirates From Outer Space down from the web, where it had been hosted by Platinum Studios since 2007. They said the company had not paid them since 2007, and had strung them along for years with false promises.

=== Darlin' It's Betta Down Where It's Wetta (2010– ) ===
Darlin' It's Betta Down Where It's Wetta chronicles the misadventures of Pearl the mermaid, who only understands human genitalia as it is told through legends. Until, a naked girl who has been shipwrecked appears and she quickly fills in the gaps of her anatomical knowledge-base. Then, she goes on an adventurous quest to find a vagina from the infamous Sea Witch.

This book is part of their Filthy Figments collection and it is widely considered to be their most erotic release of all time.

=== Meaty Yogurt (2010– ) ===
This book centers around teenage Jackie Monroe who is suffering from "small town boredom" in her city of Middleville, which is under a curse thanks to the fact it was built upon an Indian tribe's stolen land. She always strives to make her life as interesting as possible but is weighed down by other people's lack of ambition and death. Because she is so fickle with things such as choosing her college major or starting then stopping screenplays, she struggles to follow through with this. Her idol, Moira, is an out-of-town musician and Jackie's best friend, Saffron's girlfriend. Moira has been through a lot of positive and negative things, making Jackie constantly switch between idolizing and then hating her because of her own insecurities about being awkward and indecisive.

Meaty Yogurt's art style is much more realistic and subdued compared to Salarian's other works.

=== Spectacle (2018-) ===
In Spectacle, published 2018 by Oni Press, Salarian shares the story of Anna, a pragmatic engineer who despite working as a psychic at the Samson Brothers Circus, is completely skeptical of the supernatural. That is, until her twin sister, Kat, is stabbed suddenly and after she dies she gets reincarnated into a needy ghost. The two, who have consistently had problems sharing in their childhood, must now share a body together to find Kat's killer. With their troupe backing the pair upon numerous paranormal occurrences at the circus, the effort to identify them still seems hopeless. On their journey there, they discover that the killer wasn't the scariest thing there at all.

On Salarian's website, they offer a "Meet the Cast" bonus for fans who want to know more about the characters. Their character illustration in this book frequently resembles a doll and the appearance as a whole is very colorful. Anna's narration bubbles are said to be casting spells of its own as they are wrapped into the side pieces.

The Spectacle series continues into multiple volumes, with volume 5 coming out in January 2023.

== Accomplishments ==
Salarian was once mentioned in a list of influential female independent and underground comic creators by Liorah Golomb.

The webcomic won the second Queer Press Grant from Prism Comics which allowed Salarian to publish the first collected volume of the series, YU+Me:dream.

== Personal life ==
The name Rosalarian, and later Ro Salarian, comes from a nickname their dad gave them when they were growing up because he used to call them by their middle name Rose, and just started messing around with it.

One of their motivations for starting their comics career was their experience at a comics store as a young still-closeted queer woman where they noticed the abundance of sexualized women on the covers suggesting that they wanted "better" as these "stories were not even stories". They have also said they enjoyed reading yuri manga but at one point received the impression that the stories became predictable and so Salarian decided to create their own comic. Comic culture has permeated every aspect of their life and always has.

Salarian has indicated before that they enjoy keeping things like romance private, but been very open about their interest in Burlesque dancing, which has not allegedly impacted their work as a writer, but it has generally improved their work ethic. They have also been a traveling performer since 2012. Salarian is very active on social media and occasionally shows little tidbits from their life in between uploading art and informal comic strips on several of their profiles. This, along with their website and Patreon page, is the primary medium through which they connect with their fanbase.

Salarian has indicated that they identify as nonbinary or genderfluid, and uses they/them pronouns, describing their personality as "made up of several districts who all vote on what our overall identity will be on any given day. Usually the majority of the districts vote femme. But there are a lot of swing districts who will vote masc or independent."
