= List of shipwrecks in March 1882 =

The list of shipwrecks in March 1882 includes ships sunk, foundered, grounded, or otherwise lost during March 1882.

== 1 March ==
List of shipwrecks: 1 March 1882
Ship	State	Description
J. W. Stairs	United Kingdom	The barque was wrecked at Sandy Hook, New Jersey, United States with the loss of a crew member.

== 2 March ==
List of shipwrecks: 2 March 1882
Ship	State	Description
Aura	Russia	The barque was driven ashore at Villa Nueva with the loss of four of her crew.
Name unknown	Germany	The schooner foundered in the North Sea (52°00′N 2°50′E) with the loss of at least one life.

== 3 March ==
List of shipwrecks: 3 March 1882
Ship	State	Description
Concordia	Norway	The ship was abandoned in the North Sea. Her crew were rescued by the fishing smack Lisle (United Kingdom). Concordia was on a voyage from a Baltic port to London, United Kingdom.
Mount Lebanon	United Kingdom	The ship struck a rock whilst on a voyage from Calcutta, India to JeddanHejaz Vilayet. She put in to Galle, Ceylon.

== 4 March ==
List of shipwrecks: 4 March 1882
Ship	State	Description
Queen of Ceylon	United Kingdom	The ship collided with Kaffir Chief (United Kingdom) at Durban, Natal Colony and was wrecked. Her crew were rescued.

== 5 March ==
List of shipwrecks: 5 March 1882
Ship	State	Description
Edith	United Kingdom	The ship foundered in the North Sea 5 nautical miles (9.3 km) east of the Corton Lightship ( Trinity House).

== 6 March ==
List of shipwrecks: 6 March 1882
Ship	State	Description
Bonnie Maria	Portugal	The schooner collided with HMRC Rose ( Board of Customs) and sank at Portsea, Hampshire, United Kingdom. Her crew were rescued.

== 7 March ==
List of shipwrecks: 7 March 1882
Ship	State	Description
Alert	United Kingdom	The ship ran aground on the Newcombe Sands, in the North Sea off the coast of Suffolk. She was refloated with assistance from the Pakefield Lifeboat.
Canmore	United Kingdom	The barque ran aground on the Scroby Sands, Norfolk. She was on a voyage from Dunkerque, Nord to South Shields, County Durham. She was refloated with assistance from the Caister Lifeboats Covent Garden and Godsend (both Royal National Lifeboat Institution) and the tug Victoria (United Kingdom) and taken in to Great Yarmouth, Norfolk.
Doris	Germany	The brigantine foundered in the North Sea 8 nautical miles (15 km) off Hartlepool, County Durham. Her crew were rescued by the yawl Rose of England (United Kingdom). Doris was on a voyage from London to Leith, Lothian, United Kingdom.
Pride of Fleetwood	United Kingdom	The brigantine was driven ashore at Rame Head, Cornwall. She was on a voyage from Dartmouth, Devon to a Cornish port. She was abandoned as a total loss.

== 8 March ==
List of shipwrecks: 8 March 1882
Ship	State	Description
Mary Stevens	United Kingdom	The ship was abandoned off Bideford, Devon. All four people on board were rescued by the Appledore Lifeboat. She was on a voyage from Barnstaple, Devon to Newport, Monmouthshire.
Sandrino	Italy	The schooner was driven ashore at "Tarbaka", Tunisia.
Unnamed	Italy	The sloop was driven ashore at "Tarbaka".

== 9 March ==
List of shipwrecks: 9 March 1882
Ship	State	Description
Franz Bottcher	Flag unknown	The ship was driven ashore at "Manyl". She was on a voyage from Stockholm, Sweden to Newcastle upon Tyne, Northumberland, United Kingdom.
Valencia	United Kingdom	The steamship ran ashore in the River Avon under the Clifton Suspension Bridge whilst avoiding a collision with a barge. She was on a voyage from Bristol, Gloucestershire to Valencia, Spain.

== 12 March ==
List of shipwrecks: 12 March 1882
Ship	State	Description
Agnes	Norway	The brig was abandoned in the Atlantic Ocean (46°30′N 22°00′W). Her crew were rescued by the full-rigged ship Buckland (United Kingdom). Agnes was on a voyage from Manzanilla, Trinidad to Falmouth, Cornwall, United Kingdom.

== 13 March ==
List of shipwrecks: 13 March 1882
Ship	State	Description
Devonshire	United Kingdom	The brigantine collided with the brig Istria (Greece) and sank in the English Channel. Her crew were rescued by Istria.
Marie Theresa	France	The fishing smack collided with the steamship Long Ditton (United Kingdom) and sank in the English Channel 14 nautical miles (26 km) east south east of Start Point, Devon. Her crew were rescued by Long Ditton.

== 15 March ==
List of shipwrecks: 15 March 1882
Ship	State	Description
Ben Adler	United Kingdom	The steamship was driven ashore. She was on a voyage from the Clyde to Yloilo, Spanish East Indies. She was refloated and put in to Singapore, Straits Settlements in a leaky condition. She was placed under repair.
Esbjerg	Denmark	The schooner was driven ashore and wrecked on St Téodoro Island, 3 nautical miles (5.6 km) west of Canea, Greece.
Thor	Norway	The full-rigged ship ran aground at Greenock, Renfrewshire, United Kingdom. She was on a voyage from Jamaica to Greenock.

== 17 March ==
List of shipwrecks: 17 March 1882
Ship	State	Description
Northerner	United States	The schooner was lost on the Georges Bank with the loss of all 12 crew.
Oline	United Kingdom	The ship foundered in Cardigan Bay with the loss of all five crew.
Victor	United States	The schooner was lost on the Georges Bank with the loss of all twelve crew.

== 18 March ==
List of shipwrecks: 18 March 1882
Ship	State	Description
Volga	United Kingdom	The steamship ran aground at Bilbao, Spain. She subsequently broke in two and was wrecked. Her crew were rescued.

== 21 March ==
List of shipwrecks: 21 March 1882
Ship	State	Description
Gilbrow	United Kingdom	The schooner collided with the schooners Lindal Moor and Whitriggs (both United Kingdom) and sank at South End, Walney Island, Lancashire. She was refloated at taken in to Barrow-in-Furness, Lancashire.
Lessie B.	United States	The steamship was destroyed by fire near Jefferson, Texas. The cabin boy died.

== 22 March ==
List of shipwrecks: 22 March 1882
Ship	State	Description
Hawthorn	United Kingdom	The ship ran aground on the Split Rock, near Musquash, New Brunswick, Canada. She was refloated and resumed her voyage.
R. W. Boyd	United Kingdom	The steamship ran aground on the Black Middens, in the North Sea off the coast of County Durham. Her fourteen crew were rescued by the Tynemouth Lifeboat.
Two unnamed vessels	Flags unknown	Two ships were driven ashore at South Shields, County Durham, United Kingdom. One was expected to be a total wreck. There were no deaths.

== 23 March ==
List of shipwrecks: 23 March 1882
Ship	State	Description
Cairnsmuir	United Kingdom	The steamship ran aground in the Suez Canal. She was on a voyage from London to Singapore, Straits Settlements.
Mamelon	United Kingdom	The barque foundered off Mevagissey, Cornwall. Her crew survived. She was on a voyage from North Shields, Northumberland to Piombino, Italy.
Woodland	United Kingdom	The brigantine was run into by the steamship Prinses Marie (Netherlands) and sank in the Thames Estuary. Her crew were rescued by Prinses Marie. Woodland was on a voyage from Londonderry to London.

== 24 March ==
List of shipwrecks: 24 March 1882
Ship	State	Description
F. W. B.	United Kingdom	The brigantine sank in three minutes after being hit by the steamship Gertrude (United Kingdom) while at anchor off Southend, Essex. A pilot and her eight crew were landed at Gravesend, Kent, United Kingdom by Gertrude. F. W. B. was on a voyage from Berbice, British Guiana to London.
Khokand	United Kingdom	The barque was driven ashore at Bexhill-on-Sea, Sussex. She was on a voyage from Hull, Yorkshire to San Francisco, California, United States. She was refloated on 1 April.
Victor	United Kingdom	The ship was driven ashore on Inchcolm, Fife. She was on a voyage from "Boncas" to Stettin, Germany.
Trois Frères	France	The sloop departed from Havre de Grâce, Seine-Inférieure for Caen, Calvados. Subsequently foundered with the loss of all hands, a boat came ashore at Trouville-sur-Mer, Calvados.

== 25 March ==
List of shipwrecks: 25 March 1882
Ship	State	Description
Essay	United Kingdom	The ship deparrtted from Guernsey, Channel Islands for London. No further trace, reported missing.
Iron Mountain	United States	The sternwheel paddle steamer struck an obstruction and sank in the Mississippi River at Stumpy Point, near Island 102, after departing from Vicksburg, Mississippi. A stewardess was trapped below decks and killed, but the rest of the crew escaped safely onto barges.

== 26 March ==
List of shipwrecks: 26 March 1882
Ship	State	Description
Albert	United Kingdom	The sloop was run down and sunk in the English Channel by the barque Saleta (Spain). Her crew were rescued.
British Queen	United Kingdom	The schooner was driven ashore at "Pine Aun", near Port Isaac, Cornwall. Her crew were rescued by the Port Isaac RNLI lifeboat Richard and Sarah. She was on a voyage from Wexford to Port Talbot, Glamorgan.
Clara	United Kingdom	The ketch foundered off the Nash Sands, in the Bristol Channel off the coast of Glamorgan with the loss of a crew member. She was on a voyage from Swansea, Glamorgan to Fremington, Devon.
Durham	United Kingdom	The steamship ran aground on the Pan Sand, off the north Kent coast. She was on a voyage from Brisbane, Queensland to London.
Famenoth	United Kingdom	The barque sank on the Pan Sand. Her twenty passengers were taken off by the tug Venetia (United Kingdom) but a boat with a pilot and four of her crew drifted out to sea. She was later abandoned; her crew were rescued by Venetia and the tug Victoria (United Kingdom). The missing boat subsequently came ashore at Ramsgate, Kent in a waterlogged condition. Famenonth was refloated on 20 April and towed in to the River Thames.
Hannah Morris	Canada	The barque was driven ashore at Margate, Kent with the loss of a crew member. Survivors were rescued by the tug George Peabody (United Kingdom). Hannah Morris caught fire and was a total loss. She was on a voyage from New York, United States to London.
Heber	United Kingdom	The schooner was driven ashore and sank at Ryde, Isle of Wight. Her crew survived. She was later refloated and taken in to Cowes.
John and Alice	United Kingdom	The ketch ran aground off Ryde. Her crew survived. She was later refloated and put in to Portsmouth, Hampshire.
Louisa	United Kingdom	The brigantine was wrecked on the Longnose Rocks, Margate. Her crew survived. She was on a voyage from Guernsey, Channel Islands to London.
Pelton	United Kingdom	The steamship foundered off Ilfracombe, Devon with the loss of all but one of her crew. The survivor was rescued by the brigantine Uzziah (United Kingdom), which lost a crew member effecting the rescue. Pelton was on a voyage from Newport, Monmouthshire to Havre de Grâce, Seine-Inférieure, France.
Spy	United Kingdom	The Thames barge capsized off the Nore Lightship ( Trinity House). Her crew survived.
Havre Lifeboat, and an unnamed vessel	France; Flag unknown	The lifeboat capsized whilst going to the aid of a sloop at Havre de Grâce, Seine-Inférieure with the loss of all hands. The sloop was also lost with all hands - nineteen lives in total.
Unnamed	Flag unknown	The steamship foundered off the Bull Rock Lighthouse, County Cork.

== 27 March ==
List of shipwrecks: 27 March 1882
Ship	State	Description
Albert	United Kingdom	The sloop was discovered abandoned in the English Channel. She was towed in to Havre de Grâce, Seine-Inférieure, France.
Jacobine	Germany	The brig collided with Melanesia (United Kingdom) and sank in the Atlantic Ocean (25°00′N 27°30′W) and sank. Her crew were rescued by Melanesia. Jacobine was on a voyage from Rio de Janeiro, Brazil to Lisbon, Portugal.
Undaunted	United Kingdom	The ship was sighted off Cooly Point whilst on a voyage from Belfast, County Antrim to Dublin. No further trace, reported missing.

== 29 March ==
List of shipwrecks: 29 March 1882
Ship	State	Description
Liban	France	The steamship sank on the Tusker Sands, in the Bristol Channel with the loss of three of her eleven crew. Survivors were rescued by the Porthcawl Lifeboat.

== 30 March ==
List of shipwrecks: 30 March 1882
Ship	State	Description
Circassian	United Kingdom	The brig ran aground at Shoreham-by-Sea, Sussex. She was refloated with assistance the next day and taken in to Shoreham-by-Sea.
Golden City	United States	The steamer was destroyed by fire while making a landing at Memphis, Tennessee. Three crew and 22 passengers were lost.

== 31 March ==
List of shipwrecks: 31 March 1882
Ship	State	Description
Venus	United Kingdom	The smack was driven ashore and wrecked at Watermouth, Devon. Her crew were rescued by the Ilfracombe Lifeboat. She was on a voyage from Watermouth to Swansea, Glamorgan.

== Unknown date ==
List of shipwrecks: Unknown date in March 1882
Ship	State	Description
Adelaide	United Kingdom	The schooner was driven ashore in the Strangford Lough. She was on a voyage from Whitehaven, Cumberland to Malahide, County Dublin.
Apollo	United Kingdom	The steamship was run into by the steamship Précursor (France) and sank in the Atlantic Ocean 170 nautical miles (310 km) south west of Ouessant, Finistère, France with the loss of six of her crew. Apollo was on a voyage from Hull, Yorkshire to Trieste.
Aros Castle	United Kingdom	The ship was driven ashore in the Sound of Iona.
Colonel Adams	United Kingdom	The ship was driven ashore at Bordeaux, Gironde, France. She was later refloated.
Cydonia	United Kingdom	The steamship ran aground at Tisvilde, Denmark. She was on a voyage from Reval, Russia to Rotterdam, South Holland, Netherlands. She was refloated and towed in to Copenhagen, Denmark.
Eclipse	United Kingdom	The schooner was abandoned off Margate, Kent. Her crew were rescued. She was towed in to Ramsgate, Kent by the tug George Peabody (United Kingdom).
Else Marie	Denmark	The schooner foundered at sea.
Finsbury	United Kingdom	The steamship collided with the steamship Clan Maclean off Gibraltar and was severely damaged. She was beached. Finsbury was on a voyage from Messina, Sicily, Italy to New York, United States.
Feodore	Spain	The ship was driven ashore and wrecked at Cape Spear, Newfoundland Colony. She was on a voyage from Saint John's, Newfoundland Colony to a Spanish port.
Feronia	United Kingdom	The barque was abandoned in the North Sea. She was on a voyage from Brevig to a Cornish port. She was towed in to Arendal.
Ines	Spain	The ship was driven ashore at Palmas. She was on a voyage from Savannah, Georgia, United States to Palmas.
James W. Barber	Belgium	The steamship was driven ashore at Bonassola, Italy. She was on a voyage from Antwerp to Genoa Italy.
John Barfield	United Kingdom	The barque ran aground on the Shipwash Sand, in the North Sea off the coast of Suffolk. She was refloated with the assistance of two smacks.
J. W. T.	United Kingdom	The schooner ran aground on the Barnard Sand, in the North Sea off the coast of Suffolk. She was on a voyage from Runcorn, Cheshire to Newcastle upon Tyne, Northumberland. She was refloated with the assistance of a tug and the Kessingland Lifeboat St. Michael, Paddington ( Royal National Lifeboat Institution) and assisted in to Great Yarmouth, Norfolk.
Lee	United Kingdom	The ship was abandoned in the Atlantic Ocean. Her crew were rescued.
Legrid	United Kingdom	The ship ran aground in Sandy Bay. She was refloated.
Lois	Canada	The barque was wrecked on the Shipwash Sand.
Lucia	Germany	The barque was driven ashore on Læsø, Denmark. She was later refloated and taken in to Fredrikshavn, Denmark in a leaky condition. She was placed under repair.
Lucy	United Kingdom	The ship was wrecked on the Gunfleet Sand, in the North Sea off the coast of Essex. Her crew were rescued by the tug Harwich and the smack Volunteer (both United Kingdom.
Novo Luz do Dia	Portugal	The schooner foundered off Porto Santo Island, Madeira with the loss of a crew member. She was on a voyage from Bahia, Brazil to Porto.
Nuphar	United Kingdom	The steamship ran aground in the Suez Canal.
Pet	Western Australia	The schooner collided with a sperm whale and sank with the loss of her captain 50 nautical miles (93 km) south west of Cape Leeuwin with the loss of her captain. Six survivors were rescued by Agincourt (Flag unknown). Pet was on a voyage from Bunbury to Melbourne, Victoria.
Pioneer	United Kingdom	The ship was severely damaged by fire at Wick, Caithness on or about 24 March.
Richard Warbrick	United Kingdom	The schooner foundered in the Atlantic Ocean. Her crew were rescued by the barque Karlowitz (Austria-Hungary). Richard Warbrick was on a voyage from Liverpool, Lancashire to Plymouth, Devon.
Robert Jones	United Kingdom	The barque sprang a leak and sank in the Atlantic Ocean. Her crew were rescued by Holly Bough (United Kingdom). Robert Jones was on a voyage from Grimsby, Lincolnshire to Buenos Aires, Argentina.
Scotia	United Kingdom	The ship was driven ashore at Fairlie, Ayrshire. She was later refloated.
Sigred	Flag unknown	The ship sank off the Bahamas.
Syrene	United Kingdom	The derelict ship was driven ashore at Scool Ross, Isle of Mull, Inner Hebrides. .
Times	United Kingdom	The steamship was driven ashore in Loch Carnan.
William and Thomas	United Kingdom	The smack struck the wreck of Concordia (Norway) off Dover, Kent and became waterlogged.
Winschoten II	Netherlands	The brigantine struck a sunken wreck and developed a severe leak. She was on a voyage from Aracaju, Peru to a Channel port. She put in to Bahia for repairs.
