= Blood Nation =

2007 comic book miniseries

Publication information
- Publisher: Platinum Studios
- Format: Limited series
- Publication date: Feb. – May 2007
- No. of issues: 4
- Main character: Captain Ethan Cutter

Creative team
- Written by: Rob Moran
- Artist: James Devlin

Blood Nation was a four-issue comic book mini-series published by Platinum Studios. It was written by Rob Moran with art by James Devlin.

== Publication history ==
The series was started in January 2007, running until May 2007.

== Plot ==
In the future, the world is reeling from an outbreak of vampirism. The vampires have an uneasy truce with humanity, but recently there's been a new series of attacks from vampires in Russia in possession of nuclear weapons.

The protagonist, Captain Ethan Cutter, must lead his elite commando unit behind enemy lines to bring an end to the blood nation before the vampires bring an end to the world.

== Film adaptation ==
On 28 April 2010 Platinum Studios confirmed the film adaptation of Blood Nation. Alexandra Milchan and Scott Mitchell Rosenberg would produce for EMJAG Productions and Platinum Studios.
