= Andrew Foley (writer) =

Canadian comics creator

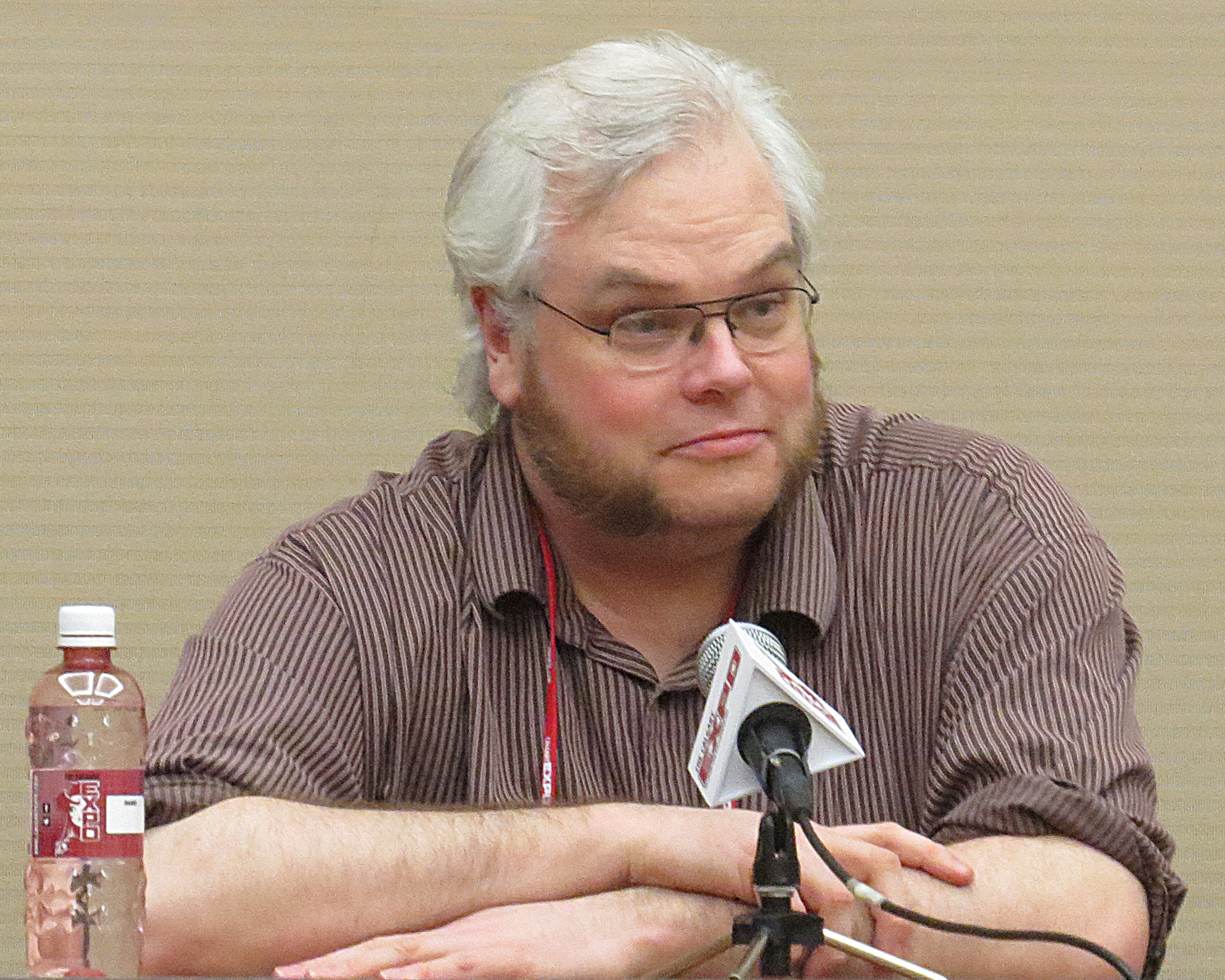
- Areas: Writer, Artist, Editor

Andrew Foley is a writer and occasional editor and artist of comic books and graphic novels. Andrew Foley lives in Edmonton, Alberta, Canada with his wife, graphic designer Tiina Andreakos.

== Biography ==
=== Early life ===
Foley graduated with distinction from the Alberta College of Art's Drawing Program in 1992 and maintained a painting studio for two years afterward, during which his work was displayed in galleries and museums across the province of Alberta, before deciding to move into writing.

=== Career ===
Andrew's first published comics work was the eight-page short story "Cal's Trick", which he wrote and drew for Cyberosia Publishing's Combustible Muse Anthology. "Cal's Trick" was later reprinted in Cyberosia's Revolving Hammer Anthology, along with another story written by Foley and drawn by Wendi Strang-Frost, called "To Whom It May Concern".

For a time Andrew worked with start-up online comics company where he acted as a submissions editor and compiled four issues of the anthology comic Remote Views.

=== Comics/books ===
- In 2004; it was announced that Foley would write The Last Empire, which was the official graphic novel sequel to Showtime Television series Jeremiah. Based on the graphic novel series by Hermann Huppen, the Jeremiah television show was created by J. Michael Straczynski. A first draft script of The Last Empire was written, and art for more than thirty comic pages was drawn and coloured, but the book remains unfinished and will likely never be released.
- In 2005, Foley wrote and drew "Two to the Skull", a twenty four-page comic completed in 24 hours as part of Happy Harbor's 24 Hour Comic Book Day event, which was staged as a fundraiser for the Alberta Literacy Foundation. The story was later published in The Happy Harbor 24 Hour Comic Anthology.
- Foley wrote and financed the 142-page graphic novel Parting ways, with art by Scott Mooney and Nick Craine. It was published in July, 2005 by the now-defunct company Speakeasy Comics.
- In 2005, he wrote Deception, the fourth volume of Harcourt Publishing's Steck-Vaughn imprint graphic novel series, Orion. Orion was created and co-edited by Marv Wolfman.
- With Jason Bardyla, Foley co-edited "Comic Talks", a book of comics, essays, prose, scripts, and pin-ups created by participants in a series of panel discussions he moderated in August, 2005. The book was published by Happy Harbor Comics, the comic shop that hosted the discussions.
- In 2006, Markosia Entertainment published Foley's five-issue satirical vampire comic Done to Death, with art by Fiona Staples.
- Foley also co-wrote a script for issue #2 of Volume Two of the Markosia multi-generational superhero series Smoke & Mirror with series creator Chuck Satterlee. Markosia halted publication of Smoke & Mirror v.2 after the first issue and Foley and Satterlee's collaborative effort remains unpublished.

In December, 2006, Foley received a co-writer credit along with Fred Van Lente on the Platinum Studios graphic novel Cowboys & Aliens. In addition to work on the Cowboys & Aliens main story, Foley wrote a five-page preamble that was illustrated by Dennis Calero.

Other comics Foley has written for Platinum Studios include Age of Kings (with art by Russell Hossain), Jest Cause, Crimson Rose, Threads (co-written with Scott O. Brown), and Twilight War Volume One: Incursion.

=== Videogames ===
In 2013, Foley started working on new content for Beamdog's enhanced edition of classic RPG Baldur's Gate II.

== Bibliography ==
- Cowboys & Aliens (with co-author Fred Van Lente and art by Luciano Lima and Dennis Calero, graphic novel, Platinum Studios, 2006)
- Six Shots, a supernatural western series with his Done to Death collaborator Fiona Staples,
- Master of The House an all-ages fantasy adventure, also with Staples,
- The Spooky Kids, an all-ages graphic novel with artist John Keane, and
- The Holiday Men, a satirical action series with artist Nick Johnson
