= The Weapon (comic book) =

Comic book limited series

Publication information
- Publisher: Platinum Studios
- Format: Limited series
- Genre: Martial arts
- Publication date: June – Sept. 2007
- No. of issues: 4
- Main character: Tommy Zhou

Creative team
- Written by: Fred Van Lente
- Artist: Scott Koblish
- Colorist: Paul Mounts

The Weapon was a martial arts/superhero comic book published by Platinum Studios in 2007. It was written by Fred Van Lente and illustrated by Scott Koblish.

== Publication history ==
The Weapon was released as a limited series from June–September 2007.

== Plot ==
Martial arts enthusiast Tommy Zhou invented a means to create solid objects from light—and invented a superhero persona to promote it: The Weapon. He even concocted an origin story for himself based on ancient Chinese legends that his grandfather told him as a child. What Tommy never suspected, though, were that his grandfather's legends were real—and now an all-too real millennia-old assassin cult, the Lin Kuie, (Forest Demons) is after him, convinced he's unlocked ancient mystical techniques of Order of Wu-Shi — "The Way of the Weapon" — and they're sending waves of killers after him to steal it back.

Tommy was born in Honolulu, in Hawaii's Chinatown, a third-generation Chinese American, raised by his grandfather. Tommy accuses his grandfather of clinging to the old ways of a country they could never return to, knowing they would never be accepted by the racist society they have entered. His family name of Zhou may be a reference to the Zhou dynasty.

== Film adaptation ==
Platinum Studios has partnered with Disney Channel star David Henrie (who is Italian American) to star as the Chinese-American character in a theatrical adaptation of The Weapon. The feature film adaptation will be produced by Platinum Studios chairman and CEO Scott Mitchell Rosenberg. Jim Henrie will also serve as producer, and former Universal Pictures senior executive Randy Greenberg of The Greenberg Group, who brought the parties together, will serve as an executive producer.
