= Platinum Studios =

US media company

Platinum Studios, Inc.
- Company type: Public
- Traded as: Expert Market: PDOS
- Industry: Comics, Movies, Television
- Founded: (U.S.) January 1997; 29 years ago (Note: The original Platinum Studios was founded in Europe by Ervin Rustemagić in 1971.)
- Founders: Ervin Rustemagić and Scott Mitchell Rosenberg
- Headquarters: Los Angeles, California, U.S.
- Key people: Scott Mitchell Rosenberg (CEO)
- Services: Licensing, Publishing
- Divisions: Platinum Studios Comics (2006–2011); Drunk Duck (2006–2010)
- Website: platinumstudios.com

Platinum Studios, Inc. is an American media company that has developed, published, and licensed comic book properties for adaptation into film, television, and other media.

Founded in 1997 by Ervin Rustemagić (Note: As explained elsewhere, the original Platinum Studios was founded in Europe by Ervin Rustemagić in 1971.) and Scott Mitchell Rosenberg, the company amassed a large library of comic book characters, which it has licensed for adaptation into film, television, and digital media. Platinum Studios produced television series such as Jeremiah (2002–2004) and films including Cowboys & Aliens (2011) and Dylan Dog: Dead of Night (2011). It has also operated print and digital publishing platforms, including Drunk Duck and WOWIO.

The company’s reputation later became controversial due to disputes with creators and business difficulties. In the early 2010s, shareholders and former executives raised allegations of financial mismanagement and self-dealing by Rosenberg, including the transfer of intellectual property to shell companies and failure to maintain required financial filings. These disputes coincided with the company being delisted from public trading and the eventual sale of its digital assets. Platinum Studios has been essentially dormant since 2011.

== Business model and operations ==
Rosenberg characterized Platinum Studios' model as "full-circle commercialization," treating intellectual property as a core asset to be spun off into films, television, webcomics, mobile content, games, toys, and merchandise. The company's philosophy is to allow creators or original publishers to continue comics publications while Platinum manages all other rights and media development.

The company focuses on two categories of properties:

- Macroverse Bible properties – a multi-thousand-page compendium of interrelated comic characters, many created by Scott Mitchell Rosenberg, including titles such as Cowboys & Aliens.
- Acquired properties – licensed from other companies or creators (such as Dylan Dog and Jeremiah), where Platinum holds all media rights while the original publishers retain comics publishing rights.

Platinum Studios Comics, launched in 2006 (and active mostly during the period 2007–2008) published material ultimately destined for adaptation into film, television, and other media (such as mobile games). Similarly, its annual contest, the "Comic Book Challenge" (2006–2008), promised contest winners prizes and publishing opportunities with Platinum Studios Comics, as well as the potential of screen adaptation. Platinum Studios' digital publishing activities (Drunk Duck and WOWIO, 2006–2010) included webcomics publishing, mobile content, and comics news and resources.

== Corporate history ==
=== Founding and partnership ===
Platinum Studios was formed in January 1997 when Scott Mitchell Rosenberg — former head of Malibu Comics — acquired a 50% stake in the European rights-agency Platinum Studios, originally founded in 1971 by Ervin Rustemagić. (The 1997 restructuring is commonly described as Rosenberg and Rustemagić "co-founding" the American Platinum Studios.) Rosenberg brought his Malibu character library (around 200 characters) and his expertise in developing comics for film and television, while Rustemagić contributed his extensive European rights portfolio (of more than 1,000 titles). Under their partnership, Platinum Studios positioned itself as a cross‑media content company, aiming to adapt its European catalog into film, television, and other media. The company established its headquarters in Beverly Hills, California.

=== Cowboys & Aliens, Jeremiah, and Dylan Dog ===
In May 1997, shortly after forming Platinum, Rosenberg licensed Cowboys & Aliens to DreamWorks/Universal Studios based on storylines, artwork, and an iconic one-sheet depicting a cowboy on horseback shooting at a spaceship.

As part of Rosenberg and Rustemagić's partnership arrangement, Platinum Studios acquired the film and television rights to Tiziano Sclavi's horror comics series Dylan Dog and Hermann Huppen's science fiction comic series Jeremiah, both of which had previously been licensed by Rustemagić. Jeremiah was eventually adapted into a science-fiction TV series on Showtime from 2002 to 2004 — the first European graphic novel series adapted into a live-action U.S. television series; Rustemagić was given the title of executive producer. Dylan Dog was the source material for the 2011 film Dylan Dog: Dead of Night.

Rustemagić left the Platinum Studios partnership in 2000.

=== Expansion and financial challenges ===
In 2005, the company hired former Time Warner executive Brian Altounian as chief operating officer, while posting net losses of $2.1 million.

From 2006 to 2008, Platinum expanded its operations — despite increasing financial losses. In 2006, it launched the Platinum Studios Comics imprint, initiated the Comic Book Challenge, and acquired the webcomics hosting platform Drunk Duck. Platinum Studios lost $4.3 million in 2006 and $5.1 million in 2007. Even when revenue increased in 2007, it still lost more than $5 million that year: operating expenses had risen sharply — from $1.6 million in 2005 to $6.6 million in 2007. At the end of 2007, the company had only about $4,000 in cash on hand. In February 2008, Platinum Studios became a publicly traded company, bringing its financial position and corporate governance under increased scrutiny.

=== 2008: A company on the brink ===
By mid-2008, Platinum Studios had accumulated a $14 million deficit and was running a negative balance of more than $1 million in just the first half of the year. The company received a formal "going-concern" warning, meaning auditors believed there was serious doubt about the company’s ability to continue operating. Three high-level insiders — including COO Brian Altounian, the general counsel, and a director — had sold more than 21 million shares collectively. The stock price had collapsed to $0.04 per share, down from $0.12 only a month earlier. In addition, Platinum had reportedly been late on payments to creators, reflecting its cash scarcity. Analysts viewed these signs the company was moving closer to insolvency.

Nevertheless, the company continued its strategy of acquiring large amounts of intellectual property and pursuing film and video-game — considered by analysts as high-risk and not a reliable revenue model. In June 2008, Platinum and John H. Williams' Vanguard Animation announced plans to launch a new comics imprint, Vanguard Comics (with Williams' company holding a 30% share in the venture). The imprint came about as a result of Williams serving on the jury for the Comic Book Challenge; Vanguard Comics, however, never released any publications.

Also in June 2008, Platinum began talks to acquire WOWIO, a Los Angeles–based digital media platform that allowed users to share and consume e-comics and E-books, while offering monetization opportunities for creators and publishers. Issues related to WOWIO's non-payment of quarterly earnings delayed the sale.

In June 2009, WOWIO was purchased outright by Brian Altounian, former Platinum COO and board member, leaving Platinum with no ownership stake. Third-quarter earnings were eventually paid under a revised formula more favorable to WOWIO. In June 2010, WOWIO acquired DrunkDuck.com from Platinum Studios. (WOWIO itself was effectively defunct by c. 2015; Drunk Duck restructured itself and continues to operate.)

=== Later developments ===
In 2011, following the underwhelming release of the Cowboys & Aliens feature film, Platinum Studios retained KKM Global Brand Strategies to oversee a licensing program for the underlying graphic novel, with the company announcing agreements for a range of related products. According to the company's SEC filings that year, Platinum reported approximately $500,000 in licensing revenue from the film Dylan Dog: Dead of Night. Platinum also claimed to have several additional properties in active development, including Unique at Walt Disney Pictures with producer David Heyman, V.I.C.E. with Andrew Lazar and Top Cow Productions, an animated feature project at Sony Pictures Animation, Blood Nation with producer Alexandra Milchan, and the television project MetaDocs with Syfy, FremantleMedia, and Landscape Entertainment. As with most properties "under development" at Platinum, however, as of 2025, none of those projects have been developed.

In 2012, Platinum Studios was delisted from public trading due to failure to file required reports and was later classified as OTC Pink No Information, indicating minimal disclosure to investors. Chris Beall was named interim president of the company in 2012.

By 2014, 27 million shares of Platinum were acquired by KCG Holdings.

== Projects and activities ==
=== Platinum Studios Comics ===
The company's publishing imprint Platinum Studios Comics operated from 2006 to 2011 (with most of its publishing activities taking place in 2007–2008). In December 2006, the Cowboys & Aliens one-sheet became the cover of the graphic novel of the same name, published by the newly minted Platinum Studios Comics. (Note: In order to make the Cowboys & Aliens comic appear to be a big seller, Platinum Studios priced the 105-page book at the low cost of $4.99 (when most graphic novels were $10 and up). Platinum attempted to game the system in various other ways, including using a business arrangement with the popular publisher Top Cow Productions to list Cowboys & Aliens in Top Cow's section of the Diamond Comic Distributors catalogue. The company also gave certain retailers huge bulk discounts on the book, all of which counted toward sales numbers. Based on these inflated numbers, Entertainment Weekly listed Cowboys & Aliens as a top seller for the month, which prompted Universal/DreamWorks to move the film project forward again.)

Like Cowboys & Aliens, many of Platinum Studios Comics' titles were developed for film, television, and other media (such as mobile games); critics contended that Platinum's publications felt more like film pitches than genuine comics, and that the company’s approach often resulted in thin or derivative work. Online releases often appeared before in-store print releases.

Notable creators published by Platinum Studios Comics included Art Baltazar, Scott O. Brown, Jay Busbee, Dennis Calero, D. J. Coffman, Chuck Dixon, Josh Elder, Andrew Foley, Megan Rose Gedris, Robert Greenberger, Scott Koblish, Andy Mangels, Dean Motter, Dave Roman, and Fred Van Lente. Industry veteran Robert Greenberger recalled a brief, chaotic editorial tenure at Platinum Studios in 2006, highlighting frequent project cancellations, frequent reshuffling of editors and artists, low pay, and creative interference from management. Despite ambitious plans for print and digital comics and adaptations, most projects never came to fruition.

In 2011, the Cowboys & Aliens graphic novel appeared on the New York Times best-seller list for both hardcover and softcover. The Cowboys & Aliens film was released theatrically in July 2011. Cowboys & Aliens received mixed reviews and underperformed at the box office, earning $174.8 million on a $163 million budget.

=== Comic Book Challenge ===
From 2006 to 2008, Platinum Studios produced the Comic Book Challenge, an annual televised competition for aspiring comic book creators. Over one million applicants submitted entries judged on the quality of their art and writing, with the final winner determined by online public voting. Winners received prizes and publishing opportunities with Platinum Studios. (Note: The Challenge's first winner, D. J. Coffman, however, wasn't given his prize money until two years after the 2006 event, and only after he publicized the fact that he had not been paid.)

The first Challenge was broadcast on KNSD in conjunction with San Diego Comic-Con; later competitions were hosted by AT&T. Notable winners included D. J. Coffman's Hero by Night (2006) and Jorge Vega's Gunplay (2007). The 2008 competition was won by Carlos Weiser's The Armageddon Chronicles, but Platinum Studios' precarious financial status at the time prevented its publication, and the Comic Book Challenge was discontinued thereafter.

=== Drunk Duck ===
In September 2006, Platinum Studios purchased the webcomics community site Drunk Duck. Rosenberg planned to use the site as Platinum's primary online platform, publishing its comics digitally before print as part of a broader "full-circle commercialization" strategy; Platinum’s public filings described "producer" agreements and other commercial arrangements for media exploitation.

The acquisition drew mixed reactions within the webcomics community. Several Drunk Duck-associated creators later raised disputes over contract terms and payments.

By mid-2010, the site hosted little Platinum Studios content but reported 95,000 subscribed users; it was acquired by WOWIO in June 2010.

== Controversies ==
In 2009, Platinum Studios founder Ervin Rustemagić — at that point no longer affiliated with the company — filed a lawsuit in the Superior Court of California (Case No. BC416936) against Platinum Studios and Rosenberg, alleging breach of an agreement under which Rustemagić was to receive 50 percent of producer fees from the exploitation of certain comics-based properties. The dispute was resolved through arbitration in April 2011, resulting in minimal liability to Platinum; under the settlement, the company guaranteed additional payments (approximately US $77,000) that Rosenberg was required to make to Rustemagić.

By the early 2010s, Platinum Studios faced significant financial, legal, and management challenges. Shareholders and former company executives raised concerns about Scott Mitchell Rosenberg’s management, including alleged diversion of company funds, misappropriation of intellectual property to shell companies, and promotion of projects that were never realized, such as Cowboys & Aliens 2 and an animated adaptation of Cowboys & Aliens.

The company and Rosenberg faced multiple lawsuits, including claims of:

- Wrongful termination, fraudulent inducement, and defamation from former employees.
- Contract disputes and unpaid invoices from vendors, such as Transcontinental Printing and DoubleClick
- Disputes related to film productions, including Dylan Dog: Dead of Night and agreements with Arclight Films.
- Alleged breaches of consulting agreements, such as with former WOWIO consultant Paul Franz.

Allegations also included the transfer of 51% of Platinum’s intellectual property to Rip Media, a company controlled by Rosenberg, reducing shareholder ownership. Some projects announced publicly were later revealed to be "motion comics" or otherwise unpublishable due to unpaid creators.

These controversies contributed to a decline in investor confidence, with stock trading at low levels and public filings indicating ongoing legal exposure and uncertainty regarding company assets and operations.

A corporate showdown occurred in January 2013, in which interim president Chris Beall attempted to oust Rosenberg over alleged financial mismanagement. Rosenberg countered, denying the claims, and shareholders voted to remove Beall instead. (Here "shareholders" effectively meant Rosenberg himself — he controlled enough shares to sway the vote in his own favor.) The duel left Rosenberg still in control of Platinum, filling the roles of "Chairman, CEO, President, Secretary, CFO, and Treasurer."

== Film and television production ==
=== Completed films and television projects ===
- Jeremiah (2002–2004) (Showtime)
- Cowboys & Aliens (2011), directed by Jon Favreau
- Dylan Dog: Dead of Night (2011), directed by Kevin Munroe

=== In development ===
Note: There have been no updates on these projects since at least 2012.

==== Films ====
- Atlantis Rising – with producer Mark Canton
- Blood Nation — with producer Alexandra Milchan
- Red Mantis (Mal Chance) – with producer Tony Krantz
- Unique – with producer David Heyman/Walt Disney Pictures
- The Weapon – with TV actor David Henrie attached

==== Television ====
- Gunplay – with Fox 21
- Indestructible Man – an unreleased title, with Fox 21

=== Unproduced ===
- Nightfall — with director James Wan

== Platinum Studios Comics titles published ==
=== Original graphic novels ===
- Alien at Large (2008), created by Bob Keenan and Rich Larson
- The Big Amoeba (2008), created, written and illustrated by Art Baltazar
- Cowboys & Aliens (2006), created by Scott Mitchell Rosenberg, written by Fred Van Lente and Andrew Foley, illustrated by Dennis Calero and Luciano Lima
- Gunplay (2008), created and written by Jorge Vega, illustrated by Dominic Vivona
- Hot Shot & Mighty Girl (2008), created by Scott Mitchell Rosenberg, written by Fred van Lente, illustrated by Billy Penn
- Love Bytes (2007), created by Scott Mitchell Rosenberg, written by Josh Elder, illustrated by Gigi
- Nightfall (2007), created and written by Scott O. Brown; illustrated by Ferran Xalabarder — originated on DrunkDuck.com; film rights acquired in 2007 by director James Wan; no film ever produced
- Red Mantis (2007), created, written and illustrated by Martin Pardo and David Morancho — translated from a Spanish comic called Mal Chance: Lola; film rights sold in 2009
- Super Larry (2008), created by Scott Mitchell Rosenberg, written by Andy Mangels, illustrated by Dan Thompson
- Watchdogs (Feb. 2007) ISBN 978-1-934220-05-4, created by Scott Mitchell Rosenberg, written by Fred Van Lente and illustrated by Brian Churilla

=== Limited series/ongoing series ===
- The Adventures of Tymm: Alien Circus (3 volumes, 2008–2011), created by Dave Roman and L. Frank Weber
- Atlantis Rising (5 issues, Oct. 2007-Apr. 2008), created by Scott O. Brown and Tim Irwin — film rights sold in 2012
- Big Badz (4 issues, 2008), created by Rob Moran, written by Chuck Dixon, illustrated by Enrique Villagrán
- Blood Nation (4 issues, Feb.–May 2007), created and written by Rob Moran, illustrated by James Devlin — film rights sold in 2010
- Consumed (4 issues, July–Oct. 2007)
- Ghosting (5 issues, Aug.-Dec. 2007) [co-published with Top Cow Productions], created by Scott Mitchell Rosenberg, written by Fred Van Lente, illustrated by Charles Carvalho and Carlos Ferreira
- Hero by Night, created, written and illustrated by D. J. Coffman, colored by Jason Embury
  - Limited series (4 issues, Mar.-June 2007)
  - Ongoing series (3 issues, Dec. 2007–2008)
  - Hero By Night Free Comic Book Day Edition (1 issue, 2008)
- I Was Kidnapped By Lesbian Pirates From Outer Space (6 issues, May 2008 – 2009), created, written and illustrated by Megan Rose Gedris
- Incursion (4 issues, Nov. 2007-Feb. 2008), created by Scott Mitchell Rosenberg, written by Jay Busbee, illustrated by Axel Medellin Machain
- Kiss 4K (6 issues, May 2007-Apr. 2008), written by Ricky Sprague, illustrated by Kevin Crossley and Thomas Ruppert
- Unique (3 issues, Mar.-May 2007), created by Scott Mitchell Rosenberg, written by Dean Motter, illustrated by Dennis Calero — film rights licensed in 2009
- The Weapon (4 issues, June–September 2007), created by Scott Mitchell Rosenberg, written by Fred Van Lente, illustrated by Scott Koblish — film rights sold in 2009
