= Scott Mitchell Rosenberg =

American film and television producer

- Born: United States
- Education: University of Denver
- Occupations: Producer, publisher
- Known for: Sunrise Distribution; Malibu Comics; Cowboys & Aliens; Platinum Studios

Scott Mitchell Rosenberg is an American film, television, and comic book producer. He is the chairman of Platinum Studios, an entertainment company that controls a library of comic-book characters and adapts them for film, television and other media. Through Platinum Studios he is affiliated with Moving Pictures Media Group. He is also the founder and former president of Malibu Comics, and is a former senior executive vice president for Marvel Comics.

As a producer with Platinum Studios, Rosenberg has released films and television programming with Universal Pictures, Paramount Pictures, DreamWorks, MGM, Showtime and Lionsgate. He has also developed film and television with several others including The Walt Disney Company, Warner Bros. Discovery's New Line Films, 20th Century Studios and Sony Pictures.

== Biography ==
=== Early career ===
Rosenberg began his career in the comic-book industry at age 13 when he started a mail order company called Direct Comics.

Rosenberg graduated from the University of Denver.

=== Sunrise Distribution and Malibu Comics ===
In the mid-1980s, Rosenberg was running the small Commerce, California-based comics distributor Sunrise Distribution. In 1986, income from his distribution business allowed Rosenberg to privately finance a number of independent comics publishers, including Eternity Comics and Malibu Comics. Rosenberg's strategy at the time relied in part on speculator demand for black-and-white comics, acquiring or launching many titles with the expectation that a few would become breakout hits. Eternity's first launch, Ex-Mutants, as Rosenberg once said in an interview, "turned out to be a hit" and "all on a $400 marketing budget."

Sunrise began to suffer cash-flow issues in the spring of 1987. At the same time, Rosenberg personally took over his various publishers, shutting most of them down and folding Eternity into Malibu as its primary imprint. In the summer of 1988, at the nadir of the "black-and-white implosion," Sunrise abruptly folded and went out of business. This left a number of small publishers without the cash flow to continue, and they, too, went out of business. Rosenberg turned his focus to Malibu Comics.

During his time at Malibu, Rosenberg led comic spin-offs into toys, television, and feature films, including the billion-dollar film and television franchise Men in Black, based on the Marvel/Malibu comic The Men in Black by Lowell Cunningham. He also acquired a number of other independent publishers, including Aircel Comics and Adventure Comics, also folding them into Malibu. Industry observers note that some of Malibu's output under Rosenberg prioritized marketable concepts over fully developed stories, reflecting his focus on generating intellectual property for cross-media exploitation.

In 1992, Rosenberg brokered a deal in which seven top-selling artists defected from Marvel Comics to form Image Comics. Rosenberg signed the artists to a label deal which made Malibu the publisher of record for the first comics from Image, giving the upstart creator-run publisher access to the distribution channels. This subsequently led to Rosenberg and his Malibu Comics breaking all sales records for independent comics; in 1992 Malibu grabbed almost 10% of the American comics market share, temporarily moving ahead of industry giant DC Comics. By the middle of 1993, Image's financial situation was secure enough to publish its titles independently, and per the agreed upon distribution agreement with Malibu, ventured out on its own.

During this period, Rosenberg also worked with Adobe Photoshop software to develop the then-leading standard for the computer coloring of comic books.

Rosenberg sold Malibu to Marvel Comics in 1994. Sources indicate that, as part of the deal, Rosenberg retained significant financial interests in Malibu properties, including intellectual property and production infrastructure. Also as part of the deal, Rosenberg was given the title senior executive vice president of Marvel.

=== Platinum Studios ===
After leaving Marvel in 1997, Rosenberg purchased half of Platinum Studios from European rights agent Ervin Rustemagić. The company was built around two types of material: properties from Rosenberg's own "Macroverse Bible," including Cowboys & Aliens, and comics acquired or licensed from other creators, such as the European properties Dylan Dog and Jeremiah. Rustemagić left the company in 2000.

Under Rosenberg, Platinum expanded into publishing and digital platforms. Between 2005 and 2008 the company pursued multiple initiatives — including the Platinum Studios Comics imprint, the Comic Book Challenge, and the acquisition of DrunkDuck.com — while reporting significant financial losses and receiving a 2008 "going-concern" warning from auditors. Platinum became a publicly traded company in February 2008.

Between 2006 and 2008 Platinum Studios Comics also published a line of original graphic novels and limited series based on concepts credited to Rosenberg, produced by professional writers and artists. Several of these works later had their film rights optioned and developed, most notably Cowboys & Aliens. The studio's most high-profile releases during Rosenberg's tenure were the feature films Cowboys & Aliens and Dylan Dog: Dead of Night (both 2011).

In 2014 KCG Holdings acquired 27 million shares of the company. The Platinum Studios website continues to operate, though public information about new projects has been limited in recent years.

== Comics bibliography ==
All characters/concepts created by Scott Mitchell Rosenberg and published by Platinum Studios Comics.

=== Original graphic novels ===
- Cowboys & Aliens (2006), written by Fred Van Lente and Andrew Foley, illustrated by Dennis Calero and Luciano Lima — film produced in 2011
- Hot Shot & Mighty Girl (2008), written by Fred van Lente, illustrated by Billy Penn
- Love Bytes (2007), written by Josh Elder, illustrated by Gigi
- Super Larry (2008), written by Andy Mangels, illustrated by Dan Thompson
- Watchdogs (Feb. 2007) ISBN 978-1-934220-05-4, written by Fred Van Lente and illustrated by Brian Churilla

=== Limited series/ongoing series ===
- Ghosting (5 issues, Aug.–Dec. 2007) [co-published with Top Cow Productions], written by Fred Van Lente, illustrated by Charles Carvalho and Carlos Ferreira
- Incursion (4 issues, Nov. 2007–Feb. 2008), written by Jay Busbee, illustrated by Axel Medellin Machain
- Unique (3 issues, Mar.–May 2007), written by Dean Motter, illustrated by Dennis Calero — film rights licensed in 2009
- The Weapon (4 issues, June–September 2007), written by Fred Van Lente, illustrated by Scott Koblish — film rights sold in 2009

== Filmography ==
=== Producer ===
- Ultraforce (comics) (1995)
- Men in Black (1997) (Special Thanks)
- Night Man (1997)
- Jeremiah (2002–2004)
- Dylan Dog: Dead of Night (2011)
- Cowboys & Aliens (2011)
