= Gunplay (comics) =

Graphic novel by Jorge Vega and Dominic Vivona

- Date: 2008
- Main characters: Abner Meeks
- Publisher: Platinum Studios

Creative team
- Writer: Jorge Vega
- Artist: Dominic Vivona
- Creators: Jorge Vega and Dominic Vivona

Original publication
- Language: English
- ISBN: 9781934220429 (trade paperback)

Gunplay is a graphic novel, written by Jorge Vega, with art by Dominic Vivona. It was published by Platinum Studios in 2008.

== Publication history ==
Vega, drawing on influences from early Western and war comics, as well as literary pairings such as Huckleberry Finn and Jim, conceived the concept from a combination of the "Rifleman's Creed" and imagery associated with Bob Marley'’s "Buffalo Soldier."

Vage was the winner of the 2007 Platinum Studios Comic Book Challenge, besting over one million other submissions.

An issue #0 preview comic book was released in March 2008, which was followed by a graphic novel. Christopher Priest provided prose backup stories in each issue, chronicling the "Legend of Abner."

== Plot ==
Buffalo Soldier Abner Meeks is condemned to roam the plains with a demonic gun that forces him to kill someone once a day or suffer soul-searing pain. After inadvertently killing a man, Abner forms an uneasy partnership with the victim’s 14-year-old son, who becomes a moral counterweight during their travels.

== Other media ==
=== Television series ===
In 2009, Platinum Studios and Fox 21 were developing a Gunplay series to be written by Final Destination and X-Files executive producer Glen Morgan. Platinum Studios' Scott Mitchell Rosenberg was intended to executive produce.

== See also ==
- Cowboys & Aliens
- Weird West
