= Scott O. Brown =

American writer (born 1975)

- Born: Scott Oliver Brown; 1975 (age 50–51) Mobile, Alabama, U.S.
- Area: Writer
- Pseudonym: S.O.B
- Notable works: Cyberosia Publishing; Nightfall

Scott O. Brown (born 1975) is an American writer, letterer, publisher, editor, and production manager. Under his publisher name Cyberosia Publishing, Brown has been responsible for publishing creators like Amin Amat, Malcolm Jones III, Drew Gilbert, Antony Johnston, Steven Grant, and Jamie Delano.

During Cyberosia's history, he oversaw the development of the supernatural pulp thriller Frightening Curves, the critically acclaimed short story collection Aporiatica, along with Overtime and Rosemary's Backpack.

Published by Platinum Studios, Brown's graphic novel Nightfall was inspired by Joss Whedon's Buffy and Angel television shows, and tells the story of industrious, right-wing survivalist David Paxton, who is sent to a tough Texas prison that is run by vampires. In 2007, it was also announced that an adaptation of Nightfall was to be James Wan's next film after Death Sentence. However, nothing materialized and Wan lost the rights to the film.

Brown is also the letterer behind the Zuda series High Moon, Box 13 at ComiXology.com, and many Platinum Studios comics, including Cowboys & Aliens, Red Mantis, and several others. He is also the writer and letterer of his self-published titles They Do Not Die, and Red Ice with artist Horacio Lalia.

== Titles published (Cyberosia) ==
- Aporiatica (2001)
- 2020 Visions (2004)
- Cathedral Child: Texas Steampunk (2002)
- Clockwork Angels (2002)
- Damned (2003)
- Dark Gate (2004)
- Death Valley (2005)
- Johnny Nemo (2002)
- Overtime (2002)
- Passenger (2004)
- Popimage Vol. 1: The Time Of Change (2002)
- Rosemary's Backpack (2002)
- Second Soul (2003)
- Spookshow (2003)
- They Do Not Die (2011)
- District Comics: An Unconventional History of Washington, DC (2012)
- Monstrology (2013)
