= Troll: The Tale of a Tail =

2018 Norwegian-Canadian animated film

- Poster
- Directed by: Kevin Munroe; Kristian Kamp (co-director)
- Screenplay by: Kevin Munroe; Suzanne Bolch; Johnny Carlsen; Peter Dodd; Kristian Kamp; Jørn Kolsrud; John May; Jonny Westernes; Daxing Zhang
- Produced by: Jean Aubert; Claudio Castravelli; Harel Goldstein; Kristian Kamp; Jørn Kolsrud; Daxing Zhang
- Music by: Daniel Scott
- Production companies: Sagatoon; Blue Bug Entertainment
- Distributed by: SF Studios Norge
- Release date: 25 December 2018
- Running time: 91 minutes
- Countries: Norway; Canada
- Languages: Norwegian; English
- Budget: 120 million NOK
- Box office: $1 million

Troll: The Tale of a Tail (Norwegian: Troll – Kongens hale) is a 2018 Norwegian-Canadian computer-animated high fantasy adventure film directed by Kevin Munroe and co-directed by Kristian Kamp. A co-production between the Norwegian Sagatoon and Canadian Blue Bug Entertainment, the film was released on 25 December 2018, for a worldwide gross of $1,080,895. With a budget of 120 million Norwegian krone, it is one of the most expensive Norwegian films ever made.

== Premise ==
Trym, the prince of the trolls, and a small group of friends have to embark on a journey to Draugen to save his father, King Grom, who has been turned into stone and had his tail stolen by an evil tyrant.

== Production ==
Production for the film lasted 15 years, beginning in 2003 and concluding in 2018. The budget of 120 million Norwegian krone was financed entirely by private investors. According to director Kamp, he wanted to do everything in Norway, however it did not work out financially. Kamp went to look elsewhere for funding for the film, and traveled to India, Germany and the United States, before ending up in Canada, where the studio Blue Bug Entertainment agreed to help finance the film.

== Release and reception ==
The film was released in Norwegian theatres on 25 December 2018, and grossed $199,547 in its opening week for a total of $725,387 during its entire theatrical run. It grossed $1,080,895 worldwide.

Einar Aarvig of Filmmagasinet gave the film four out of six stars, saying: "As soon as one accepts that Troll: The Tale of a Tail does not have much to do with either Norwegian folklore or Asbjørnsen and Moe's management of it, it turns out to be a pretty fun children's film."

Troll: The Tale of a Tail was nominated for "Best Children's Film" at the 2019 Amanda Awards, but lost to Psychobitch.
