= Dylan Dog: Dead of Night =

2011 American film by Kevin Munroe

- Theatrical release poster
- Directed by: Kevin Munroe
- Written by: Thomas Dean Donnelly; Joshua Oppenheimer
- Based on: Dylan Dog by Tiziano Sclavi
- Produced by: Ashok Amritraj; Scott Mitchell Rosenberg; Gilbert Adler
- Starring: Brandon Routh; Sam Huntington; Anita Briem; Peter Stormare; Taye Diggs
- Cinematography: Geoffrey Hall
- Edited by: Paul Hirsch
- Music by: Klaus Badelt; Andrew Reiher
- Production companies: Hyde Park Entertainment; Platinum Studios, Inc.; Omnilab Media Group
- Distributed by: Omni/Freestyle Releasing
- Release dates: March 16, 2011 (Italy); April 29, 2011 (United States)
- Running time: 108 minutes
- Country: United States
- Language: English
- Budget: $20 million
- Box office: $5.8 million

Dylan Dog: Dead of Night is a 2011 American comedy horror film based on Tiziano Sclavi's Italian comic book Dylan Dog. The film was directed by Kevin Munroe, and written by Thomas Dean Donnelly and Joshua Oppenheimer. Brandon Routh stars as the eponymous antagonistic and self-aware detective who investigates cases involving the vampires, zombies, and werewolves of New Orleans. Sam Huntington, Anita Briem, Peter Stormare, and Taye Diggs are among the supporting cast.

Dylan Dog: Dead of Night was released by Omni/Freestyle Releasing in the United States on April 29, 2011. The film received negative reviews from critics, and was a box-office bomb after grossing just $5.8 million on a $20 million budget.

== Plot ==
In New Orleans, Dylan Dog, a paranormal detective, recounts his past experiences helping people with supernatural cases until his wife was killed by vampires. He currently works on regular cases with his partner, Marcus Deckler.

When Elizabeth Ryan finds her father dead and is attacked by a strange creature, she seeks Dylan's help. Initially reluctant, Dylan changes his mind after Marcus is killed by the same creature. He begins investigating and identifies the killer as an eighteen-to nineteen-year-old werewolf from the Cysnos clan. Dylan suspects Mara, the daughter of his old friend Gabriel, who he then goes to visit. Gabriel's son, Wolfgang, attacks Dylan but is defeated.

Dylan discovers Mara's body in a warehouse and encounters a vampire. Elizabeth reveals her father's missing artifact, linking it to the vampire attacks. Dylan and Elizabeth are later attacked by vampires demanding "The Heart." They escape and continue their investigation.

At the morgue, Dylan finds Marcus turned into a zombie. Dylan takes Marcus and Elizabeth to a black market for body parts, where they learn that vampires, led by Vargas, seek "The Heart." Dylan confronts Vargas at a nightclub but gets no answers.

Dylan consults his vampire friend, Borelli, who reveals that "The Heart" is the "Heart of Belial," a relic containing the blood of an ancient monster. Dylan retrieves the relic from a vampire elder's tomb but is captured by Vargas. Vargas admits to killing Dylan's wife and takes the Heart before trapping Dylan and Marcus in a crypt.

After escaping, Dylan and Marcus pursue Vargas, who plans to turn Elizabeth into a vampire with Belial's blood. Dylan realizes Elizabeth is the true enemy and wants revenge for her father's death. He confronts her at the Corpus House and battles Belial, who possesses Vargas. Elizabeth is attacked by Wolfgang and his werewolf allies, ultimately killing her. Belial dies, leaving Vargas unconscious.

Dylan entrusts the Heart to Wolfgang and decides to revive his paranormal detective agency, partnering with Marcus once again.

== Cast ==
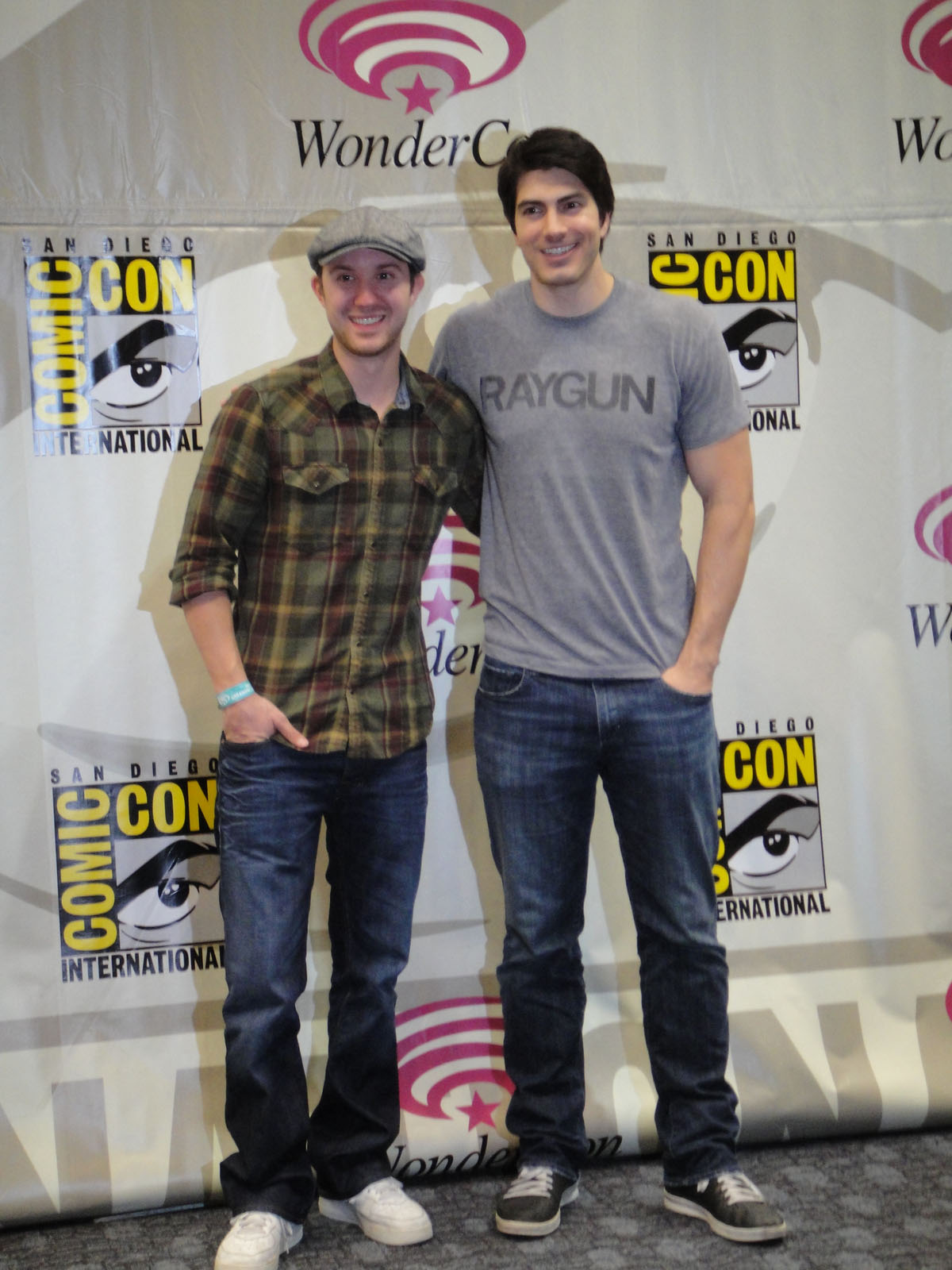
Sam Huntington and Brandon Routh at WonderCon 2011

- Brandon Routh as Dylan Dog, the eponymous detective
- Anita Briem as Elizabeth Ryan
- Sam Huntington as Marcus
- Taye Diggs as Vargas
- Kurt Angle as Wolfgang
- Peter Stormare as Gabriel
- Kent Jude Bernard as Pale Teen / Slake
- Mitchell Whitfield as Cecil
- Michael Cotter as Phil
- Laura Spencer as Zoe
- James Hébert as Lorca
- Dan Braverman as Big Al
- Marco St. John as Borelli
- Kyle Clements as Roddy
- Douglas M. Griffin as Harkin
- Devin Faraci as Cannibal Zombie

== Production ==
Screenwriters Thomas Dean Donnelly and Joshua Oppenheimer initially set the film up at Dimension Films in 1998. Oppenheimer lobbied for Breck Eisner to direct, having already produced his student short film Recon. The film was produced by independent film companies Platinum Studios and Hyde Park Entertainment, distributed by Freestyle Releasing, and directed by Kevin Munroe. It starred Brandon Routh, Sam Huntington, Anita Briem, Peter Stormare, and Taye Diggs. This was the second time Routh and Huntington co-starred in a film together, the previous film being Superman Returns (2006).

== Release ==
Dylan Dog: Dead of Night was released in the United States and Canada on April 29, 2011. The film was released in Italy on March 16, 2011. The world premiere took place on March 15.

== Reception ==
=== Box office ===
Dylan Dog: Dead of Night grossed $1.2 million in the United States and Canada, and $4.6 million in other territories, for a worldwide total of $5.8 million, against a $20 million production budget.

=== Critical response ===
On review aggregate website Rotten Tomatoes, the film holds an approval rating of 5% based on 44 reviews, with an average rating of 3.43/10. The website's critics consensus called the film "an uninspired, feebly-acted horror/comedy that produces little scares and laughs." On Metacritic, the film holds a weighted average score of 31 out of 100, based on 10 critics, indicating "generally unfavorable" reviews.

Luca Raffaelli of la Repubblica, said "it's a good B-movie inspired by a great top-league European comic", and pointed out that the character of Brandon Routh "is hollow" while the original comic character "uses the horror to talk about modern society's problems". Roberto Castrogiovanni (www.Movieplayer.it) tries not to compare the movie to the original comic, but states that "not everything is perfect", and the biggest problem is "the original plot and the development of the screenplay": the plot is predictable, dialogues contain the usual stereotypes, and the main character is just the usual American action-man. Federica Aliano (www.Film.it) heavily criticized the movie, saying "it's far worse than any bad expectation", and highlighted the big difference with the original comic: "the mature feeling of Tiziano Sclavi's masterpiece could never be achieved by using splatter and beautiful images, but by using psychological introspection and by projecting into reality the nightmares and fears of characters and readers". Federico Gironi (Coming Soon Television) refers to the film without comparing it to the original comic, and notes many similarities with Underworld, Buffy the Vampire Slayer, and True Blood, which make the film "like baby food, good for an extremely young target [audience] without a deep critical edge", although the director "avoids disappointing the audience and gets a couple of good gags [in]".

== See also ==
- Cemetery Man, another film based on a work by Tiziano Sclavi.
