= Iron Mountain (riverboat) =

Mississippi River stern-wheeler (mysteriously sank 1882)

Coordinates: 32°29′15″N 90°59′47″W

History

United States
- Name: SS Iron Mountain
- Owner: Mound City Ice Company
- Launched: 1872
- Fate: Sank, March 1882
- Notes: 1 life lost

General characteristics
- Type: Stern-wheel paddle steamer
- Length: 181 ft (55.2 m)
- Beam: 35 ft (10.7 m)
- Propulsion: Steam engine

The Iron Mountain was a stern-wheeler that plied the Mississippi River for ten years until sinking in 1882. Built in 1872 on the Ohio River at Pittsburgh, the boat was 181 feet (55 m) long and had a 35 feet (11 m) beam. The ship ran aground and sank in 1882. However, a common legend claims that it mysteriously disappeared.

== Sinking ==
The Iron Mountain sailed from Vicksburg, Mississippi on March 25, 1882, and hit an obstruction at Stumpy Point, near Island 102, which holed her hull and sank her. The crew scrambled onto one of the barges and escaped. Ellen Anderson, a chambermaid/ship stewardess, was caught below decks and killed. Her body was recovered the next day with some wreckage, but there was no sign of the ship. Further wreckage was found on June 30, several miles from where the boat was lost. The sinking of the ship was reported locally, with articles appearing in the March 27 edition of the Vicksburg Daily Commercial, and the March 28 issue of the Daily Memphis Avalanche. The ship was not found until later, having apparently been refloated by flood waters and carried through a break in a levee, and grounded in a cotton field at Omega Landing, near Tallulah, Louisiana.

== Legend ==
A common legend claims that Iron Mountain was travelling from New Orleans to Pittsburgh, loaded with cotton and sugar, when it disappeared. It sailed from Vicksburg, Mississippi and headed north, towing a string of barges and with 55 crew and passengers aboard. Another steamer, the Iroquois Chief, found the Iron Mountain's barges floating downriver, apparently having been cut loose, but the ship itself had vanished.

This legend is often repeated as fact, as in Frank Edward's 1956 book, Strangest of All, Paul Begg's Into Thin Air (1979), the Reader's Digest's Mysteries of the Unexplained (1982), Louis L'Amour's The Haunted Mesa (1987), Charles Berlitz's World of Strange Phenomena (1988) and Herbie Brennan's Seriously Weird True Stories (1997). Most versions of the story give the date of the "disappearance" as 1872, which was the year of the ship's launching. It is also rumored that the steamer SS Valencia was cursed due to Iron Mountain’s disappearance. She was under construction at the time of the incident, and after years of schemes, incidents, and complaints of her ability to handle heavy seas and the thickness of her bulkheads, she ran aground on the Washington coast, and sank with only 37 survivors, none of whom were women or children. For years afterward, there were multiple reports of Valencia sailing along the coast, and of ghostly lifeboats being seen floating with the bodies of the crew inside them. In 1933, one of her lifeboats was found adrift and recovered.

== In popular culture ==
The legend was indirectly shown in the 2011 science fiction Western film Cowboys and Aliens. In this film there is a scene where a posse discover an upturned Mississippi riverboat in the middle of the desert in New Mexico. Although the boat's name is not shown or mentioned, it is presumed that it is the Iron Mountain that was dropped there by the extraterrestrials.
