= Dennis Calero =

American artist and illustrator

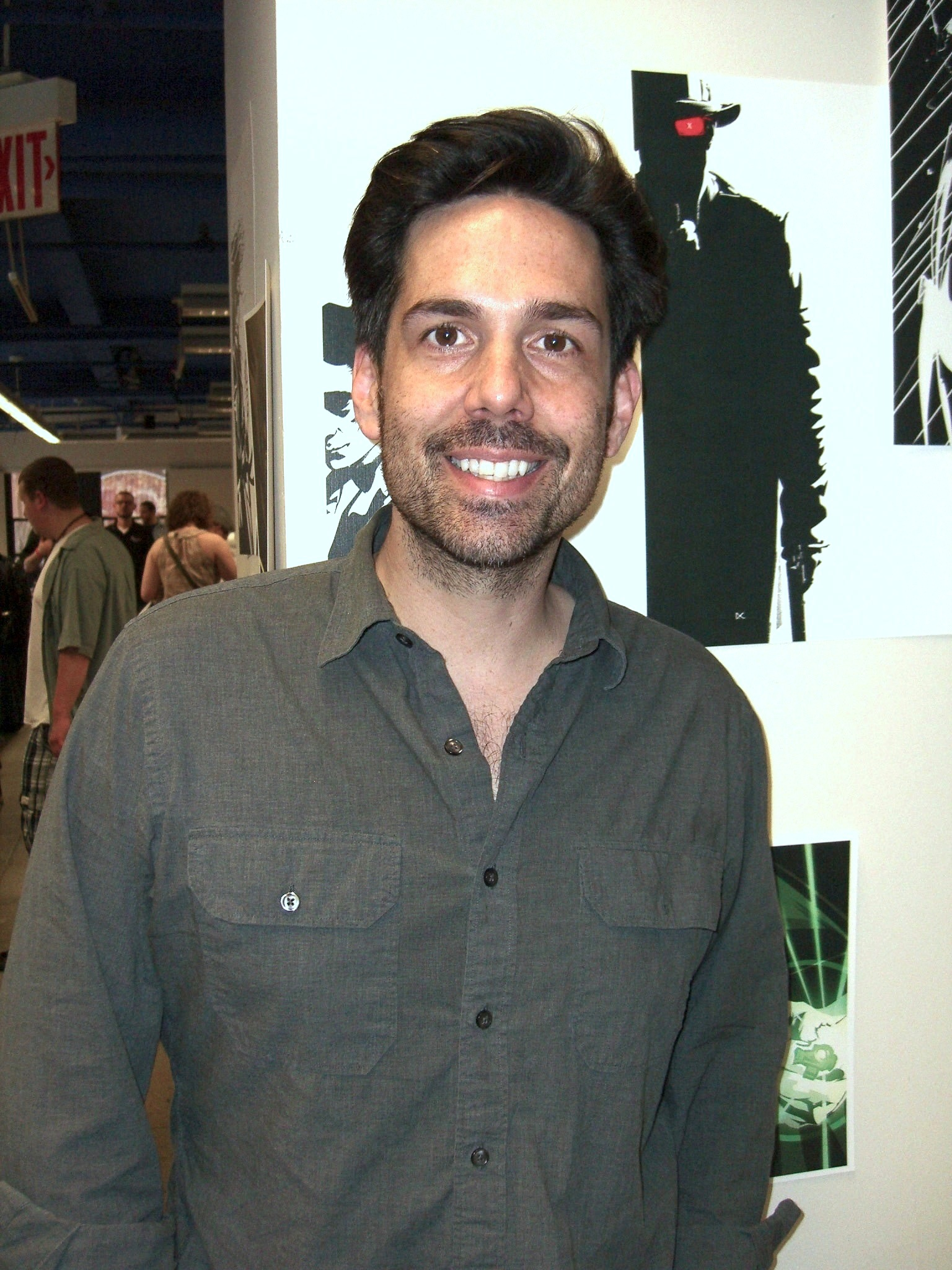
- Calero at the Big Apple Convention, May 21, 2011
- Born: Miami Beach, Florida
- Areas: Writer, Penciller, Inker, Colourist
- Notable works: X Factor; Legion of Superheroes; Kolchak; X-Men Noir
- Awards: Harvey Award Nomination, best new series, X Factor 2006

Dennis Calero is an American comic book artist and illustrator, known for his work on titles such as X-Men Noir, Spider-Man Noir, X Factor, Legion of Superheroes, and Kolchak.

== Career ==
Calero's work includes Acclaim Comics' licensed-product titles Sliders and Magic: The Gathering; Moonstone Books' TV tie-in titles Cisco Kid and Kolchak: The Night Stalker, Platinum Comics' Cowboys & Aliens; IDW Publishing's Masters of Horror: Dreams in the Witch House; and Marvel Comics' X-Factor, during his tenure on which the title was nominated for the Harvey Award for Best New Series (2006). In 2006, IDW announced that Calero would be one of the cover artists on its six-issue Star Trek: The Next Generation TV tie-in miniseries The Space Between, scheduled for 2007.

Calero was one of the principal artists for the graphic novel 28 Days Later: The Aftermath, published in 2007.

Calero drew an arc of Legion of Super-Heroes for DC Comics and his new Marvel Comics series, X-Men Noir, was released by Marvel in December 2008. X-Men Noir: Mark of Cain was released in 2010.

That same year, he drew the Dark Horse Comics relaunch of the former Gold Key and Valiant character, Doctor Solar, Man of the Atom, which was written by Jim Shooter.

In 2009 Dennis Calero received an honorable mention from the Society of Illustrators West for his work on X-Men Noir.

In 2012, Calero illustrated the Shadow Annual for Dynamite Entertainment and is illustrating issues 2-8 of MASKS, a mini-series developed by Dynamite, Alex Ross and Chris Roberson putting together many of the popular pulp heroes Dynamic Forces licenses, such as the Green Hornet & Kato, the Shadow, and Zorro.

In October 2012, Calero began illustrating a webcomic titled: The Little Green God of Agony for Stephen King, a short story that had been published in the 2011 anthology A Book of Horrors by King.

Calero illustrated The Tell-Tale Heart in 2013, part of the Edgar Allan Poe Graphic Novels series. In a positive review, Booklist expressed that Calero "shows off a virtuoso command of the format and impressive knowledge of his horror antecedents with the visuals."

=== Other work ===
Since 1996, Calero has provided illustrations for role-playing games, including works released by White Wolf Publishing. He has provided interior artwork for Dungeons & Dragons books for the Forgotten Realms including Silver Marches, Faiths and Pantheons, and Races of Faerûn.

Calero and illustrator Kristin Sorra co-founded Atomic Paintbrush, one of the first computer-coloring companies working in the comic-book field.

Devil Inside, based upon a webcomic co-created by Dennis Calero and actor Todd Stashwick, was optioned in 2011 for development. It was also announced on Deadline.com that Calero and Stashwick were writing an original pilot for the SyFy channel called Clandestine.

== Bibliography ==
- Cowboys & Aliens (with authors Fred Van Lente and Andrew Foley, graphic novel, Platinum Studios, 2006, ISBN 978-1-58240-724-1)
- Supergirl & Legion of Super-Heroes #32–36 (with Tony Bedard, DC Comics, 2007–2008)
- Ray Bradbury's The Martian Chronicles: The Authorized Adaptation (by Ray Bradbury, graphic novel, Farrar, Straus and Giroux, 2011, ISBN 978-0-80906-793-0)
- Assassin's Creed: Templars (with Fred Van Lente, Titan Comics, March 2016 – January 2017)
