= Thomas Dean Donnelly and Joshua Oppenheimer =

American screenwriters

Thomas Dean Donnelly Joshua Oppenheimer
- Occupation: screenwriter
- Years active: 2003-2011

Thomas Dean Donnelly and Joshua Oppenheimer are American screenwriters.

== Filmography ==
- Thoughtcrimes (2003)
- Sahara (2005)
- A Sound of Thunder (2005)
- Dylan Dog: Dead of Night (2011)
- Conan the Barbarian (2011)
