= D. J. Coffman =

American cartoonist (born 1976)

- Born: January 17, 1976 (age 50) Mount Pleasant, PA
- Areas: Cartoonist, Writer, Penciller, Inker, Letterer
- Notable works: VeeFriends; Hero by Night; Yirmumah; The God Child
- Awards: Comic Book Challenge winner 2006; Golden Quill Award, CityPaper 2017

Donald Jesse "D.J." Coffman (born January 17, 1976) is an American cartoonist. He is best known as the creator of the Hero by Night comic book series and the webcomic Yirmumah. Coffman also has done work on the Monkey Man comic series with writer Brian Lynch that included a webcomic on Kevin Smith's MoviePoopShoot.com.

== Early life ==
Coffman was born on January 17, 1976 in Mount Pleasant, Pennsylvania. His family moved to Southern California in 1987, where he spent his formative years in Palm Springs, California before later moving back to Scottdale, Pennsylvania in 1994.

== Career ==
=== Yirmumah ===
Yirmumah
- Author: D.J. Coffman
- Website: http://yirmumah.net
- Current status/schedule: Updating every Weekday
- Launch date: October 5, 2003
- Genre(s): Pop Culture, Comedy

Yirmumah is a daily webcomic written and drawn by Coffman, and sometimes written by collaborator Bob McDeavitt. Yirmumah is part of the webcomics collective Keenspot. It has been published as a minicomic and as a color comic book series. Yirmumah was also a regular feature in the 2005 relaunch of Cracked magazine and Cracked Magazine.com.

In 2006, Coffman switched Yirmumah back to an autobiographical comic called ORIGIN which features the story of how his father and mother met.

=== Hero by Night ===
In July 2006 Coffman and his project Hero by Night won the first annual Comic Book Challenge contest, held by comics publisher Platinum Studios and NBC.

Hero by Night
- Author: D. J. Coffman
- Website: http://herobynight.com
- Current status/schedule: updating daily
- Launch date: October 3, 2006
- Genre(s): Super Hero, Adventure

Hero by Night tells the adventures of a Jack King, who discovers an older superhero's hidden lair and his gear. After debating selling the hero's stuff on eBay and attracting the hero's enemies' attention, King decides to instead use the gear to become the modern incarnation of the hero.

In December 2007, Hero By Night launched as an ongoing comic book series. After publishing three issues, Platinum suspended its comic publishing line due to financial issues. All creators on the Hero By Night book were eventually paid in full.

The Hollywood Reporter announced in October 2008 that there were plans to adapt Hero By Night into a live-action television series.

In late December 2011, Coffman announced that he had regained the rights to Hero by Night from Platinum and that he would be reinitiating the series, which would then be published daily at Keenspot.com

=== Later career ===
In late 2007, Coffman was selected to be a judge for the 2007 Comic Book Challenge.

On June 9, 2008, Coffman teamed with the Denver-based hip-hop/rock band Flobots to produce an original webcomic that features stories based on real life accounts of their fans meant to inspire social change. The webcomic was published at Flobots.net

In April 2014, Coffman collaborated with writer Ally Monroe to develop The God Child, a dark, supernatural comic series. The first chapter premiered in July 2014 at San Diego Comic-Con, receiving attention for its unique premise. After its initial release, Caliber Comics signed the series for publication, planning to release collected editions once the first story arc was completed. The God Child follows a clandestine organization known as The Church, which has operated for centuries to prevent the prophesied second coming of Christ. This society recruits a team of assassins and mercenaries who relentlessly hunt down individuals believed to carry the potential Antichrist, aiming to eliminate any threat they perceive to humanity's future.

In 2017, Coffman won a Golden Quill award, first place in lifestyle reporting for Pittsburgh City Paper, which featured a citywide bar crawl. The illustrations were drawn live in each location by Coffman on cocktail napkins. The story, art and interactive map also won best digital lifestyle story, beating out all other media outlets in Western Pennsylvania. Later that year, Coffman illustrated the children's book, "Despite the Height" by WNBA All-Star Ivory Latta. In November 2022 Coffman illustrated "Go, Discover Westmoreland", a children's history of Westmoreland County, Pennsylvania.

Coffman founded the Draw or Die Co. in March 2022. Draw or Die Co. is motivating visual storytellers to live a more sustainable creative life. By motivating and encouraging each other the members combat creative depression and find the tools they need to continue their creative journeys.

In January 2024 Coffman joined VeeFriends, an intellectual property brand created by serial entrepreneur Gary Vaynerchuk, as a full-time daily comic strip artist. The comic runs Monday through Sunday at Veefriends.com.
