= Kevin Munroe =

Canadian filmmaker

- Occupations: Director; screenwriter; producer; animator
- Years active: 1995–present

Kevin Munroe is a Canadian filmmaker and animator. He is known for directing the animated films TMNT (2007) and Ratchet & Clank (2016).

== Career ==
Munroe has done extensive animation work during the last decade including video games, TV series, comic books and original. He has worked on the development of writing and design of animated projects for companies like Jim Henson Company, Stan Winston Studios, Shiny Entertainment, Disney, Warner Bros., Cartoon Network and Nickelodeon.

Munroe started his career as storyboard artist on Nickelodeon's Hey Arnold!. He also created, scripted and produced the international Christmas special Donner for ABC Family and TV-Loonland. He also made his directorial debut with the video game Freaky Flyers. He also wrote the critically acclaimed comic book series El Zombo Fantasma which he co-created with Dave Wilkins for Dark Horse Comics, and Olympus Heights for IDW Publishing.

In March 2005, Imagi International signed him on to direct TMNT for a 2007 release date. Kevin Munroe was scheduled to direct Science Ninja Team Gatchaman the movie but pulled out.

Munroe directed and co-produced the 2011 film Dylan Dog: Dead of Night, a live action adaptation of the Italian comic Dylan Dog.

In 2016, Munroe co-directed the animated film Ratchet & Clank, based on the popular video game franchise of the same name.

In 2026, he directed Treasure Trekkers, based on the popular series of the same name.

== Works ==
Year	Filmography	Credit
1999	Hey Arnold! (TV)	Storyboard artist
2001	Donner (TV)	Writer, producer, character designer, production designer
2003	Freaky Flyers (VG)	Director, writer, lead artist
2006	The Ant Bully	Concept artist
2007	TMNT	Director, writer, character designer
2011	Dylan Dog: Dead of Night	Director, co-producer
2014	Heavenly Sword	Executive producer
2015	Strange Magic	Co-producer
2016	Ratchet & Clank	Director, writer, executive producer
2017	My Little Pony: The Movie	Creative consultant, storyboard artist
2018	Troll: The Tale of a Tail	Director, writer, storyboard artist
2026	Treasure Trekkers	Director, writer
TBA	El Zombo Fantasma	Director, writer
