= Scott Koblish =

American comic book artist

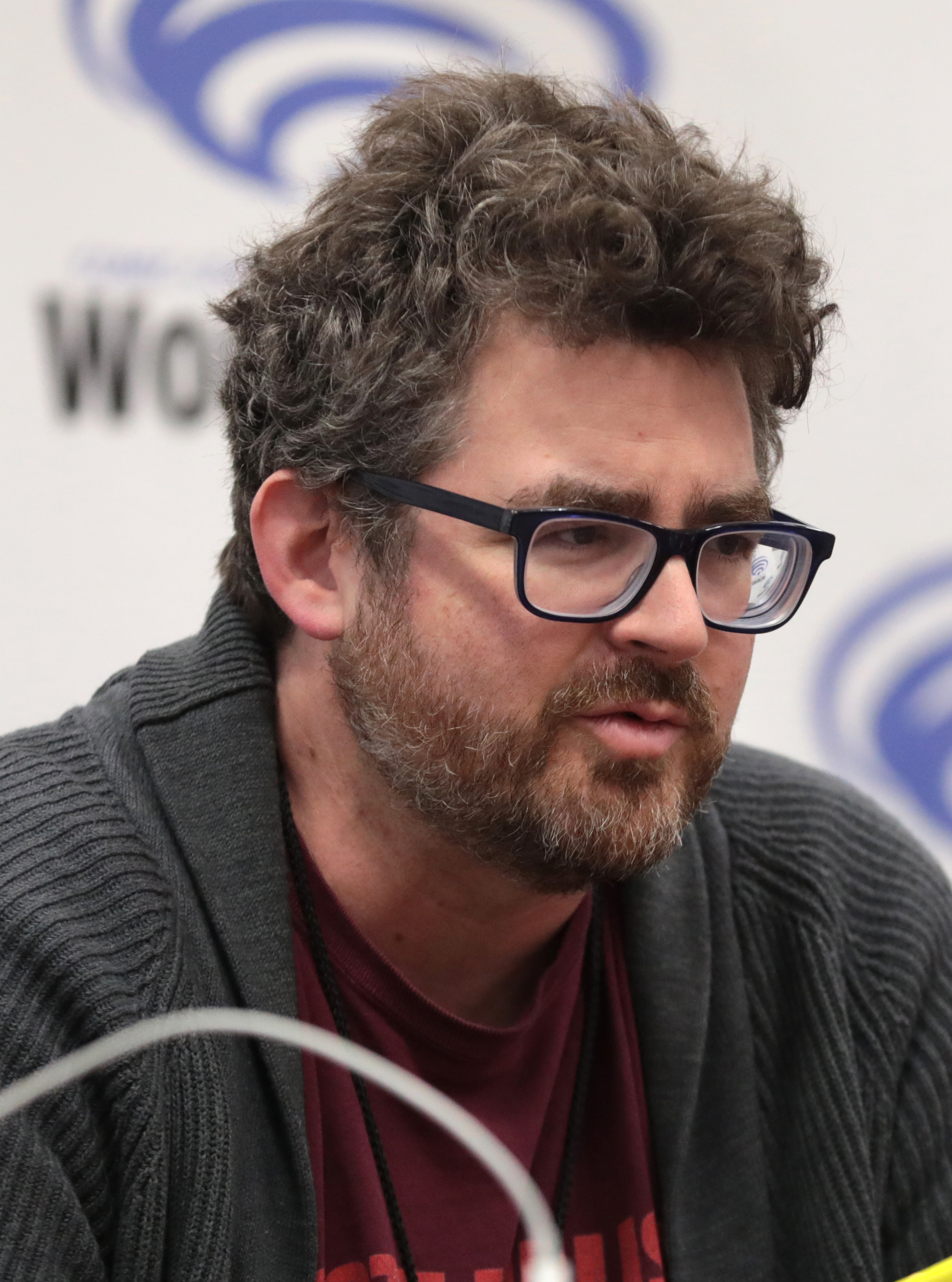
- Koblish at the 2023 WonderCon
- Born: May 1970 (age 56); New York, United States
- Occupations: Comic book artist; penciler; colourist; cover artist; inker
- Notable work: Deadpool; Captain America; The Many Deaths of Scott Koblish; The Jet Pack Pets; Dr. Strange; The Avengers; Spider-Man/Deadpool; Final Crisis: Legion of 3 Worlds; The Secret History of the War on Weed

Scott Koblish (/ˈkoʊblɪʃ/ KOH-blish; born May 28, 1970) is an American comic book artist. He has hundreds of comics credits at both Marvel Comics and DC Comics.

== Education ==
Scott Koblish attended The Kubert School of Cartooning and Graphic Art when he was nine years old. He graduated from the School of Visual Arts in Manhattan with a BFA in Cartooning and Illustration.

== Bibliography ==
Scott Koblish began working at Marvel Comics through an apprentice program called the Romita Raiders in 1993. By summer 1993, he was working freelance as an inker, and for the next 15 years he inked hundreds of comics such as G.I. Joe, Punisher, Elektra, Excalibur, Thor, Captain America, The Avengers, Fantastic Four, and Nomad. Freelancing for DC Comics, Koblish inked on multiple titles such as OMAC, The Brave and the Bold, Worlds' Finest, and Final Crisis: Legion of 3 Worlds. He inked the Star Trek/X-Men crossover "Second Contact".

Beginning in 2008, Koblish began pencilling projects with The Weapon, a mini-series from Platinum Comics. He pencilled and inked the character Deadpool for six years. Koblish pencilled various Disney Magazine Projects, notably the "Jet Pack Pets" for Disney and drew Stan Lee Media's the "7th Portal".

In 2018, Chronicle Books published The Many Deaths of Scott Koblish, cartoon strips by the artist in which he lampoons his own demise.

Koblish pencilled Deadpool for six years, drawing the art for the cover to Deadpool #27 which set the Guinness World Record for most characters to appear on a comic book cover.

Koblish, along with Gerry Duggan and Brian Posehn started work on a comic for Image Comics called The Secret History of the War on Weed, which debuted on April 20, 2022.

== Personal life ==
Scott Koblish has a child and is married to Jillian Koblish. He resides in Los Angeles, California.
