= Cowboys & Aliens (comics) =

2006 graphic novel

- Date: December 2006
- Page count: 105 pages
- Publisher: Platinum Studios Comics/HarperCollins

Creative team
- Writers: Fred Van Lente; Andrew Foley
- Artists: Dennis Calero and Luciano Lima
- Colorists: Andrew Elder
- Creator: Scott Mitchell Rosenberg

Original publication
- Language: English
- ISBN: 978-1582407241

Chronology
- Followed by: Cowboys and Aliens: Worlds at War

Cowboys & Aliens is a 2006 American science fiction Western graphic novel created by Scott Mitchell Rosenberg and written by Fred Van Lente and Andrew Foley, with art by Dennis Calero and Luciano Lima, and published by Platinum Studios.

== Publication history ==
Platinum Studios founder & chairman Rosenberg came up with the Cowboys & Aliens concept in 1997. Rosenberg and European rights agent Ervin Rustemagić had tried to sell the film rights to the Western comic Tex, but were not finding success. Instead, Rosenberg's employee Greg Noveck came up with a title: Cowboys and Aliens. Rosenberg had Noveck and another employee, Paul Benjamin, work up a film pitch, including character designs.

Using their one-sheet, Rosenberg and Rustemagić (represented by William Morris Agency) got film rights interest from such studios as Universal Pictures, DreamWorks Studios, Fox Family Films, Columbia Pictures, Walt Disney Entertainment, and Paramount Pictures. In May 1997, Universal Pictures and DreamWorks Studios acquired the rights to Cowboys & Aliens, which was described as a "graphic novel in development."

By the mid-2000s, with the project in turnaround, Rosenberg commissioned writers Fred Van Lente & Andrew Foley and artists Dennis Calero and Luciano Lima to create a Cowboys & Aliens original graphic novel, which was first published in December 2006 by Platinum Studios Comics (and offered for free on DrunkDuck.com). The company published other Cowboys & Aliens-related versions in various formats between mid-2006 through 2012:

- Regular edition to comic shops released through Top Cow Productions
- Special editions to large comics-retailers and mail-order houses, with their own logos along with sales incentives and promotions
- Special gold softback and Black hardback editions, many of which were Platinum Studios’ and Rosenberg's gifts to the cast and crew of the Cowboys & Aliens film
- New York Times Best Seller Hardback graphic album, released by HarperCollins
- New York Times Best Seller softback "movie cover" released by HarperCollins
- Barnes & Noble Nook Edition

=== Controversy ===
In order to make the Cowboys & Aliens comic appear to be a big seller, Platinum Studios priced the 105-page book at the low cost of $4.99 (when most graphic novels were $10 and up). Platinum attempted to game the system in various other ways, including using a business arrangement with the popular publisher Top Cow Productions to list Cowboys & Aliens in Top Cow's section of the Diamond Comic Distributors catalogue. They also gave certain retailers huge bulk discounts on the book, all of which counted toward sales numbers. Based on these inflated numbers, Entertainment Weekly listed Cowboys & Aliens as a top seller for the month, which prompted Universal/DreamWorks to move the film project forward again.

== Plot synopsis ==
In the Southwestern United States in a retro-futuristic version of the 1870s, gunslingers Zeke Jackson and Verity Jones are hired to protect a caravan that is heading to Silver City, Arizona, to work at a silver mine. They are ambushed by Apache Indians in the desert and the two groups witness the crash-landing of an alien spaceship. Its inhabitants, led by Commander Rado Dar, exterminate some of the Indians, allowing Zeke and Verity to escape, as the aliens set out to conquer the planet Earth. While the aliens regroup and destroy a nearby fort, Zeke and Verity arrive at Silver City with the settlers, only to discover that, aside from a handyman named Alan Cross (the original founder and mayor of the city), most of the town's inhabitants left after it was discovered that the silver mines were empty.

The cowboys are attacked by aliens riding in flying motorcycle-like vehicles and are chased to a cliff, where they are rescued by Apache Indians led by Chief Medicine Crow and the warrior Warhawk, who ambush the aliens. The two groups decide to join forces in order to defeat the aliens, and scavenge the fallen ones for weapons. Zeke steals a microwave-emitting pistol, Verity steals an energy whip, Warhawk steals X-Ray goggles and the other Indians steal explosives that they attach to their arrows. A blacksmith uses the scraps of the motorcycles to forge anti-gravity horseshoes that allow the Indians to ride on flying horses.

The humans also receive the assistance of Commander Dar's assistant, Ra Chak Kai, who has switched sides and falls in love with Zeke. She reveals that the aliens (who call themselves The Caste) have taken over Silver City and are building a communication device that will allow them to call in troops from their homeworld to enslave the entire Earth. Verity and Warhawk also fall in love. Cross offers to lead a decoy group on a frontal attack against the aliens, allowing a second group led by Zeke to infiltrate the city through the empty silver mines and attack. Cross betrays them, in hopes of being spared by the aliens. The humans are captured, including Cross, who, despite his treachery, is thrown in with the other human prisoners and is killed by Verity. The captured humans are set for execution at dawn, just as the beacon is about to send its transmission, but the rest of the Indians arrive on their flying horses and defeat most of the aliens. Zeke and Kai kill Commander Dar while Verity and Warhawk deal with his second-in-command and destroy the aliens' communications tower. As the humans celebrate their victory, Kai is secretly revealed to be part of a race of shapeshifting aliens that have organized a resistance against the Caste warlords. For their bravery, the humans are added to the list of races with the strength needed to stand against the Caste.

== Film adaptation ==
Jon Favreau directed the screen adaptation from Universal Pictures, Paramount Pictures, and DreamWorks Studios of the comic, starring Daniel Craig, Harrison Ford, Olivia Wilde, Sam Rockwell, Noah Ringer, Paul Dano, Ana de la Reguera, and Clancy Brown. The film was produced by Ron Howard, Brian Grazer, writers Alex Kurtzman and Roberto Orci, and Scott Mitchell Rosenberg. Steven Spielberg and director Favreau acted as the film's executive producers.

Zeke Johnson's name was changed to "Jake Lonergan" in the film.

The film was released on July 29, 2011 and grossed $174 million worldwide.

== Webcomic sequel ==
Cowboys and Aliens: Worlds at War (or Cowboys & Aliens II) is a 2007 online-only extension of the graphic novel. It is written by Alana Joli Abbott.

== See also ==
- Gunplay (2008)
- Space Western
- Weird West
- List of Native American superheroes
