= The Towers of Bois-Maury =

Belgian comic series by Hermann Huppen

- Cover of the final volume "L'Homme à la Hache", 2021
- Author(s): Hermann Huppen, Yves Huppen
- Illustrator: Hermann Huppen
- Current status/schedule: Discontinued
- Launch date: 1984
- End date: 2021
- Publisher: Glénat
- Genre(s): Adventure, Historical comics

The Towers of Bois-Maury (original French title: Les Tours de Bois-Maury) is a Belgian series of comic books begun in 1984 by Hermann.

== Plot ==
Set in 11th-century Europe, the series concerns the efforts of the wandering noble Sir Aymar de Bois-Maury, knight, to reclaim his ancestral home, Bois-Maury. Less focused on action than other series by Hermann (like Jeremiah), Les Tours de Bois-Maury deals more with human failings, thoughts and considerations.

== Albums ==
=== Original publications in French ===
In Europe, it had been customary for a series to first see a serialized comic magazine pre-publication, before the volume was released in its entirety as a comic book, or rather comic album in Europe's case. In France, six volumes of the original story cycle were serialized by parent publisher Glénat Éditions in their comic magazines Circus (volume 1, issues 73-78, 1984) and Vécu (volumes 2-6 and 10, issues 3, 1985-34, 1988 and 58, 1993), before the comic magazine pre-publication format became largely defunct in the 1990s because of the waning interest in the format. This resulted in that after "Sigurd", subsequent volumes were directly released by Glénat in the album format with volume ten, "Olivier", as the sole exception. Additionally, volume 11 saw a licensed serialized pre-publication in LZ Publications' BoDoï hybrid comics journal/magazine in 1997/98 (issues 4 & 5), whereas volume 16 was serialized in DBD's equally hybrid L'Immanquable magazine in 2021 (issues 125 & 127). By focusing more on the human condition, the series, like the other 1980s-90s Glénat publications (such as the BDs of François Bourgeon, a contemporary Glénat colleague of Hermann), was aimed at a more mature readership than the usual young adolescent target readership of the hitherto traditional bande dessinée.

With the 2021 Johnny-Come-Lately volume 16 as the stated conclusion of the series, the series comprises the following albums:

Les Tours de Bois-Maury (the original story cycle as published by Glénat)

1. Babette, 10/1984, ISBN 2-7234-0475-7
2. Eloise de Montgri, 11/1985, ISBN 2-7234-0533-8
3. Germain, 11/1986, ISBN 2-7234-0661-X
4. Reinhardt, 11/1987, ISBN 2-7234-0857-4
5. Alda, 01/1989, ISBN 2-7234-0984-8
6. Sigurd, 01/1990, ISBN 2-7234-1178-8
7. William, 12/1990, ISBN 2-7234-1345-4
8. Le seldjouki, 04/1992, ISBN 2-7234-1423-X
9. Khaled, 03/1993, ISBN 2-7234-1617-8
10. Olivier, 08/1995, ISBN 2-7234-1783-2

Bois-Maury (spin-off series dealing with Aymar's descendants – excepting volume 16 which was chronologically situated between volumes 9 and 10 of the original story cycle – initially published by Glénat under the abridged series title before reverting back to the full series title)

11. Assunta, 03/1998, ISBN 2-7234-2503-7
12. Rodrigo, 08/2001, ISBN 2-7234-3608-X
13. Dulle Griet, 08/2006, ISBN 2-7234-5579-3
14. Vassya, 08/2009, ISBN 978-2-7234-7051-3
15. Œil de ciel, 04/2012, ISBN 978-2-7234-8658-3
16. L'Homme à la hache, 09/2021, ISBN 978-2-344-04731-6

The first eleven volumes have been drawn and written by Hermann himself, whereas the last five volumes had been written by his son Yves H.

=== Foreign translations ===
In continental Europe, the series became a runaway success everywhere the series became published and albums have seen publications in Croatian, Danish, Dutch, Finnish, German, Italian, Polish, Portuguese, Serbian, Slovenian, and Spanish. Like in France, the majority of European countries saw the first few volumes serialized in local comic magazines, before their respective album publications. And like in France, they too switched over to the direct-in-album publication format as well for the same reasons.

=== English translations ===
In the UK (and US) the series did considerably less well, resulting in that only the first few albums and the "Rodrigo" title were published in English by different companies, all of them under the series title, The Towers of Bois-Maury.

1. "Babette"

- Titan Books UK, 52 pages, December 1985 paperback, ISBN 0-907610-47-1. Reprinted with different cover in 1989.
- Dark Horse Comics (Strip Art Features="SAF") USA, 52 pages, May 2002 hardback, ISBN 1-56971-768-0.

2. "Eloise de Montgri"

- Titan Books UK, 52 pages, March 1989 paperback, ISBN 1-85286-113-4.
- Dark Horse Comics (Strip Art Features) USA, 52 pages, November 2002 hardback, ISBN 1-56971-769-9.

3. "Germain"

- Catalan Communications USA, 52 pages, 1990 paperback, ISBN 0-87416-100-2, but which was almost certainly never released as its ISBN was reassigned to Catalan's unrelated "Dorm Girls" title that did see a Grand Comics Database confirmed publication a year later, contrary to the "Germain" title.
- SAF Comics announced its hardback publication for an October 2003 release, ISBN 1-59396-006-9, but ultimately never came around to release it either.

4. "Alda"

- Heavy Metal (magazine) USA, July 1990 (Vol. 14 No. 3) issue; features the graphic novel in its 44-page entirety.

12. "Rodrigo"

- Dark Horse Comics (Strip Art Features) USA, 56 pages, November 2001 hardback, ISBN 978-1569716328.
