= Celia Hawkesworth =

British translator

- Born: 1942 (age 83–84)
- Education: University of Cambridge
- Occupations: Academic, translator
- Writing career
- Language: English
- Notable work: Belladonna by Daša Drndić
- Notable awards: 2018 Warwick Prize for Women in Translation; 2019 Oxford-Weidenfeld Translation Prize

Celia Hawkesworth (born 1942) is an author, lecturer, and translator of Croatian and Serbian.

== Biography ==
Celia Hawkesworth graduated from Newnham College, Cambridge in 1964 and was awarded a British Council scholarship to study in Belgrade for 10 months, where she began her career as a translator. From 1971 to 2002, she was a senior lecturer of Serbian and Croatian in the School of Slavonic and East European Studies at the University of London. Based in Kirtlington and an active part of the environmentalist movement, she has translated over 40 books by Slavic authors into English, including The Culture of Lies by Dubravka Ugrešić, My Heart by Semezdin Mehmedinović, EEG by Daša Drndić, and Omer Pasha Latas by Nobel Prize winner Ivo Andrić. She has also written several textbooks of colloquial Croatian, Serbian, Serbo-Croatian, an anthology of Serbian and Bosnian women writers, a cultural history of Zagreb, and a literary biography of Ivo Andrić.

In 1975, she was appointed to as a trustee to the British Trust Scholarship and has served as both secretary and chairperson.

Her translation of Daša Drndić's Canzone di Guerra (Istros Books) and Senka Marić's Body Kintsugi (Peirene Press) were awarded a PEN Translates grant by English PEN.

== Selected bibliography ==
=== Translator ===
- Andrić, Ivo (1992), Conversation with Goya, translated by Celia Hawkesworth; Andrew Harvey, London, UK: Menard with the School of Slavonic and East European Studies, University of London, ISBN 0903400774
- Andrić, Ivo (2007), The Damned Yard and Other Stories, Belgrade: Dereta, ISBN 978-8673465975
- Andrić, Ivo (2010), The Days of the Consuls, translated by Celia Hawkesworth; Bogdan Rakić, Belgrade: Dereta, ISBN 978-8673467740
- Andrić, Ivo (2016), Bosnian Chronicle, London: Head of Zeus, ISBN 9781784971120
- Andrić, Ivo (2018), Omer Pasha Latas, New York: New York Review of Books, ISBN 978-1681372525
- Arsenijevic, Vladimir (1996), In The Hold, Oakland, CA: Fodor's Travel, ISBN 0679446575
- Čolić, Velibor (2018), The Uncannily Strange and Brief Life of Amedeo Modigliani, London: Pushkin Press, ISBN 978-1782274971
- Čolović, Ivan (2002), Politics Of Identity In Serbia, New York: New York University Press, ISBN 0814716253
- Drndić, Daša (2017), Leica Format, London: MacLehose Press, ISBN 978-1848665873
- Drndić, Daša (2017), Belladonna, London: MacLehose Press, ISBN 978-0857054319
- Drndić, Daša (2019), Doppelgänger, translated by Celia Hawkesworth; S.D. Curtis, New York: New Directions, ISBN 978-0811228916
- Drndić, Daša (2019), EEG, New York: New Directions, ISBN 978-0811228480
- Gotovac, Vlado (2002), Black Sails, Zagreb: Institut Vlado Gotovac, ISBN 9539904900
- Kurspahic, Nermina (2000), Hiatus: Under The Sign Of Sickness, In The Name Of Health, London: Society for the Furthrance of Critical Philosophy, ISBN 0953400921
- Lazarevska, Alma (2014), Death in the Museum of Modern Art: Six Stories, London: Istros Books, ISBN 978-1908236173
- Lengold, Jelena (2013), Fairground Magician, London: Istros Books, ISBN 978-1908236104
- Maksimović, Desanka (1988), I Seek Clemency, Belgrade: Association of Serbian Writers
- Marić, Senka (2022), Body Kintsugi, London: Peirene Press, ISBN 9781908670731
- Mehmedinović, Semezdin (2021), My Heart, New York: Catapult, ISBN 978-1646220076
- Novak, Slobodan (2007), Gold, Frankincense, and Myrrh, Iowa City: Autumn Hill Books, ISBN 978-0975444467
- Rudan, Vedrana (2004), Night, Normal, IL: Dalkey Archive Press, ISBN 1564783472
- Samokovlija, Isak (1997), Tales of Old Sarajevo, translated by Celia Hawkesworth; Christina Pribićević-Zorić, London: Vallentine Mitchell, ISBN 0853033323
- Savičević, Olja (2015), Farewell, Cowboy, London: Istros Books, ISBN 978-1908236487
- Savičević, Olja (2019), Singer in the Night, London: Istros Books, ISBN 978-1912545971
- Simić, Roman (2015), A Frame for the Family Lion: Stories, translated by Celia Hawkesworth; Tomislav Kuzmanović; Mima Simić, Zagreb: V.B.Z., ISBN 978-8679983596
- Sršen, Matko (2013), Odohohol and Cally Rascal, London: Istros Books, ISBN 978-1908236159
- Ugrešić, Dubravka (1992), In the Jaws of Life and Other Stories, translated by Celia Hawkesworth; Michael Henry Heim, London: Virago Press, ISBN 0810111004
- Ugrešić, Dubravka (1998), The Culture of Lies, Philadelphia: Penn State University Press, ISBN 027101847X
- Ugrešić, Dubravka (1999), The Museum of Unconditional Surrender, New York: New Directions, ISBN 0811214931
- Ugrešić, Dubravka (2003), Thank You For Not Reading: Essays on Literary Trivia, translated by Celia Hawkesworth; Damion Searls, Normal, IL: Dalkey Archive Press, ISBN 1564782980
- Ugrešić, Dubravka (2009), Baba Yaga Laid an Egg, translated by Celia Hawkesworth; Ellen Elias-Bursać, Edinburgh: Canongate, ISBN 978-1847670663
- Ugrešić, Dubravka (2014), Karaoke Culture, translated by Celia Hawkesworth; Ellen Elias-Bursać; David Williams, University of Rochester: Open Letter Books, ISBN 978-1934824573
- Ugrešić, Dubravka (2018), American Fictionary, translated by Celia Hawkesworth; Ellen Elias-Bursać, University of Rochester: Open Letter Books, ISBN 978-1940953908
- Veličković, Nenad (2005), Lodgers, Evanston, IL: Northwestern University Press, ISBN 0810122413
- Velmar-Janković, Svetlana (1996), Dungeon, Belgrade: Dereta, ISBN 8681283677
- Vrkljan, Irena (1999), The Silk, the Shears and Marina; or, About Biography, translated by Celia Hawkesworth; Sibelan Forrester, Evanston, IL: Northwestern University Press, ISBN 0810116030
- Zanic, Ivo (2007), Flag on the Mountain: a political anthropology of the war in Croatia and Bosnia-Herzegovina 1990-1995, translated by Celia Hawkesworth; Graham McMaster, London: The Bosnian Institute, ISBN 978-0863568152

== Accolades ==
- 1998: Weidenfeld Prize for Literary Translation shortlist for The Museum of Unconditional Surrender by Dubravka Ugrešić
- 1999: Heldt Prize for Culture of Lies by Dubravka Ugrešić
- 2018: EBRD Literature Prize finalist for Belladonna by Daša Drndić
- 2018: Warwick Prize for Women in Translation winner for Belladonna by Daša Drndić
- 2018: Oxford-Weidenfeld Translation Prize shortlist for Belladonna by Daša Drndić
- 2019: Republic of Consciousness Prize shortlist for Doppelgänger by Daša Drndić
- 2019: Oxford-Weidenfeld Translation Prize winner for Omer Pasha Latas by Ivo Andrić
- 2020: American Association of Teachers for Slavic and Eastern European Languages' Best Literary Translation into English for EEG by Daša Drndić
- 2020: Best Translated Book Award for EEG by Daša Drndić
