= Sarajevo Tango =

Comic book by Hermann Huppen

- Author: Hermann
- Illustrator: Hermann
- Language: French
- Subject: Siege of Sarajevo, Bosnian War
- Genre: Comics, Memoir
- Publisher: Dupuis
- Publication date: 1995
- Publication place: United States
- Media type: Print, Paperback
- Pages: 56
- ISBN: 2-8001-2269-2
- Preceded by: Missié Vandisandi
- Followed by: Le secret des hommes-chiens

Sarajevo Tango is an anti-war comic book by Hermann initially released in 1995. Sarajevo Tango is also the first of Hermann's big works done in direct color, and according to several critics, one of his finest.

On the surface the book follows a crime story that takes place in Sarajevo during the Siege of Sarajevo (1992–1996). However, in the background Hermann clearly shows his disgust with the international community‚ in particular with its lack of action and decisiveness in preventing killings that occurred in Bosnia and Herzegovina during the entire war. Key figures such as Boutros Boutros-Ghali, Yasushi Akashi, General Lewis MacKenzie, and British diplomat David Owen are portrayed in the book as active participants, though often under slightly modified names.

The book is dedicated to the innocent victims of the Sarajevo siege and Bosnian war. Copies of Sarajevo Tango were sent to various politicians, United Nations, and government officials, artists, journalists and global celebrities. The book is also dedicated to Karim Zaimović, a young journalist and publicist killed in Sarajevo during the siege by Serbian mortar shells; and in part to Ervin Rustemagić, Hermann's personal friend and survivor of the siege.

English language rights to the book were awarded to Rustemagić's Strip Art Features. The book was also translated into Bosnian, Swedish, and Danish,

In 1995 Herman received the Durbuy-Grand Prix for Sarajevo Tango.

== See also ==
- Fax from Sarajevo
