= Ervin Rustemagić =

Comic producer

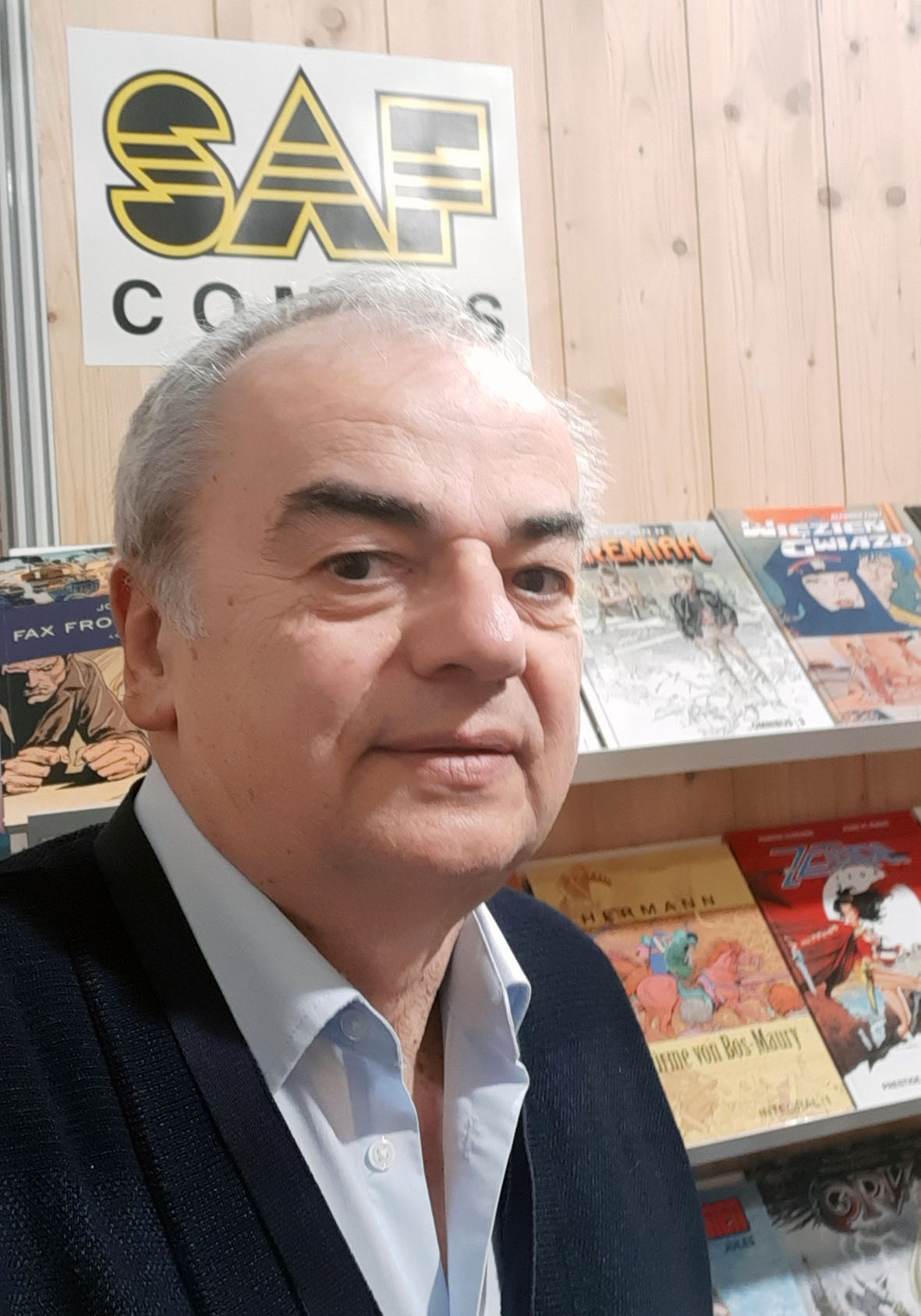
- Ervin Rustemagić at the SAF stand in 2022
- Born: 25 April 1952 Sarajevo, Bosnia and Herzegovina, SFR Yugoslavia
- Died: July 26, 2025 (aged 73) Slovenia
- Areas: Editor, Publisher
- Notable works: Strip Art; Strip Art Features; Platinum Studios
- Awards: Yellow Kid Award (1984)
- Spouse: Edina
- Children: Maja, Edvin

Ervin Rustemagić (1952–2025) was a Bosnian comic book publisher, distributor, and rights agent, born in Sarajevo, Bosnia and Herzegovina, and based in Slovenia. He was the founder of Strip Art Features (SAF) in Sarajevo, as well as the magazine Strip Art of the former Yugoslavia. Rustemagić (through Strip Art Features/Platinum Studios) represented artists such as Hermann Huppen, Bane Kerac, and Joe Kubert.

His personal plight, documented by telefax during the war in Bosnia and Herzegovina, was the theme of the award-winning nonfiction graphic novel Fax from Sarajevo by Joe Kubert.

== Biography ==
=== SAF/Strip Art ===
In 1971, at the age of 17, Rustemagić founded the publisher/rights agency Strip Art Features (SAF) and began publishing Strip Art magazine. The rights agency component of SAF, known as Platinum Studios, developed a large, internationally oriented library of non-superhero properties. From its inception, the company focused on representing a broad range of genres and maintaining relationships with prominent European creators and publishers.

From the mid-1970s, his network and reputation had expanded; in 1973 he was invited to be a member of the jury for the first Angoulême International Comics Festival. Strip Art had established itself in Yugoslavia as a central comics resource, publishing foreign authors and presenting an impressive panorama of world comics. In 1984 Strip Art won the Yellow Kid Prize of Lucca Comics & Games as Best Foreign Comics Publisher.

By the early 1990s, Platinum had grown into one of Europe's major comic-property rights holders, with a catalog of more than a thousand titles and exclusive affiliations with several high-profile artists.

=== 1992–1995 Bosnian War and Fax From Sarajevo ===
With the beginning of the Bosnian War in early 1992, Rustemagić's home and the SAF offices in the Sarajevo suburb of Ilidža were destroyed. More than 14,000 pieces of original art were lost in the flames, including pieces by Americans Hal Foster, Doug Wildey, Joe Kubert, Warren Tufts, Sergio Aragonés, George McManus, Alex Raymond, Charles M. Schulz, Mort Walker, John Prentice, Al Williamson, Gordon Bess, and Bud Sagendorf; works by Argentinian artists such as Alberto Breccia and Carlos Meglia; and pieces by European creators like André Franquin, Maurice Tillieux, Hermann, Martin Lodewijk, Philippe Bercovici, Giorgio Cavazzano, John Burns, and Ferdinando Tacconi.

Rustemagić was trapped in the war-torn city with his family, sheltering in an apartment building in Dobrinja. Some months later, in October 1992, the family moved locations to the Sarajevo Holiday Inn, at that point mostly occupied by foreign journalists and constantly under fire.

Thanks to help from European publishers and artists, in late 1993 Rustemagić gained journalist accreditation, enabling him to escape Bosnia and Herzegovina. After more than a month fruitlessly attempting to get his family out of the country, he was given Slovenian citizenship, which immediately transferred to his family. In September 1993 the family was reunited in Split, Croatia. At some point during the siege, Rustemagić's mother was killed when a hospital where she had been taken due to illness was captured by Serbian troops.

This was the story told in Fax from Sarajevo. During the development of the graphic novel, Rustemagić initially resisted its publication, but was persuaded to allow it by his daughter Maja, who encouraged him to let Kubert proceed with the project.

=== Later career ===
Rustemagić co-founded an American iteration of Platinum Studios in January 1997 with Scott Mitchell Rosenberg, previously the publisher of Malibu Comics. As part of the arrangement, Platinum Studios acquired the film and television rights to Dylan Dog and Jeremiah, both of which had previously been licensed by Rustemagić. Jeremiah was eventually adapted into a science-fiction TV series which ran on Showtime from 2002 to 2004; Rustemagić was given the title of executive producer of the series. Dylan Dog was the source material for the 2010 film Dylan Dog: Dead of Night. Rustemagić left Platinum Studios in 2000, returning to full-time work at Strip Art Features.

In 2009, Rustemagić filed a lawsuit in the Superior Court of California against Platinum Studios and Rosenberg, alleging breach of an agreement under which Rustemagić was to receive 50 percent of producer fees from the exploitation of certain comics-based properties. The dispute was resolved through arbitration in April 2011; under the settlement, Platinum Studios guaranteed additional payments (approximately US $77,000) that Rosenberg was required to make to Rustemagić.

Rustemagić continued to facilitate international comics projects, including commissioning major works such as Martin Lodewijk & John M. Burns' Zetari (1983) and bringing Italian comics like Martin Mystère, Dylan Dog, and Nathan Never to English-speaking audiences via Dark Horse Comics in the 1990s.

== Personal life and death ==
Rustemagić was an ethnic Bosniak of Jewish background, though his family was not religious. He and his wife Edina had two children, Maja (born July 20, 1982) and Edvin (born c. 1987). Rustemagić died in Slovenia in July 2025 after a long illness.
