= Karim Zaimović =

- Born: 6 May 1971; Sarajevo, SR Bosnia and Herzegovina, Yugoslavia
- Died: 13 August 1995 (aged 24); Sarajevo, Republic of Bosnia and Herzegovina
- Occupations: Writer, Journalist
- Writing career
- Notable work: The Secret Of Raspberry Jam

Karim Zaimović (6 May 1971 – 13 August 1995) was a Bosnian writer, journalist and publicist, best remembered for his short story collection The Secret of Raspberry Jam. He is considered one of the most talented writers from the wartime ex-Yugoslavian area.

Zaimović died during the Bosnian War as a result of injuries caused by Serbian mortar shells during the Siege of Sarajevo.

== Biography ==
Zaimović was born in Sarajevo in 1971, the son of painter Mehmed Zaimović (1938–2011) and his wife Ašida.

A lover of comic books, Zaimović began writing texts about them in his early teens. He started his journalism career at age 15, writing articles for Radio Sarajevo. Zaimović continued to be involved in the Bosnian-Herzegovinian journalism scene, contributing to daily newspapers and magazines like Naši dani, Lica, Vidici, Quorum, Kvadrat, Patak, Slobodna Dalmacija, Nedjeljna Dalmacija, Književna revija, Mladina, Start, Erasmus, Oslobođenje, Večernje novine, Avaz, Ven, Sineast, Fantom slobode, and Dani.

After graduating from high school at Sarajevo's Prva Gimnazija, Zaimović enrolled in the Academy of Fine Arts in Sarajevo. He later transferred to the University of Philosophy in Sarajevo to study comparative literature.

Before the war, Zaimović worked for the magazine Dani as editor of the paper's culture section. Later, he created the culture magazine Fantom Slobode with Semezdin Mehmedinović, serving as editor in-chief. He was a regular contributor to Zid, an independent radio network, and contributed to Sarajevo-based television programs like TV Sarajevo and TV Radio Sarajevo.

Zaimović wrote many short stories. During the war, he shared his stories on the air on his radio show. One of his notable works, The Secret of Raspberry Jam, was a critically acclaimed collection of 11 short stories, published posthumously in 1997.

The Belgian comics artist Hermann Huppen dedicated his 1995 book Sarajevo Tango to Zaimović's memory. The American graphic novel author Joe Kubert has also dedicated his Fax from Sarajevo to Karim Zaimović. Zaimović's "The Secret Of Raspberry Jam" has been adapted for theatre.

Zaimović left behind a manuscript with two unfinished novels.

== Works ==
- Tajna džema od malina (1995)
