= Ellen Elias-Bursać =

American scholar and translator

Ellen Elias-Bursać (born 1952) is an American scholar and literary translator. Specializing in South Slavic literature, she has translated numerous works from Bosnian, Croatian, and Serbian.

== Early life ==
Ellen Elias was born in Cambridge, Massachusetts. Her parents were Peter and Marjorie (née Forbes) Elias. She has two brothers. Her aunt was Barbara Elias, a poet.

She studied at the Commonwealth School in Boston, graduating in 1970. She attended Macalester College, receiving a Bachelor of Arts degree in Russian literature and language in 1974.

During her undergraduate studies, she attended a study abroad programme in Yugoslavia. She worked as a freelance translator, and studied towards a master's degree at the University of Zagreb.

In 1999, she received a PhD from University of Zagreb in philology; her dissertation was titled Augustina-Tina Ujevića prijevodi iz anglo-američke književnosti: komparativno/kontrastivna lingvo-stilistička analiza.

== Career ==
Elias-Bursać worked as a language preceptor in the Slavic department of Harvard University for 10 years. In 2005, she joined the English Translation Unit of the International Criminal Tribunal for the former Yugoslavia (ICTY), in The Hague. Since leaving the ICTY she has been working as a free-lance translator, an independent scholar, and a contributing editor to Asymptote. She is a past president of the American Literary Translators Association.

== Works ==
=== Translations ===
From Bosnian

- Imširević, Almir (2025). If this were a movie.... Laertes Press. ISBN 978-1-942281-37-5
- Larson, Emira [in Bosnian] (June 2014). "Scheherazade". In Translation.
- Zaimović, Karim. "The Invasion of the Cows". Asymptote.
- Zaimović, Karim (4 September 2008). "Episode #18 of "Joseph and His Brothers"". Words Without Borders.

From Croatian

- Drakulić, Slavenka (1993). Holograms of Fear. The Women's Press. ISBN 978-0704343351.
- Šoljan, Antun (2000). A Brief Excursion and Other Stories. Northwestern University. ISBN 978-0810116351.
- Ugrešić, Dubravka (2008). Nobody's Home. Open Letter. ISBN 978-1934824009.
- Ugrešić, Dubravka (2010). Baba Yaga Laid an Egg. Canongate. ISBN 978-0802119278.
- Otržan, Đurđa [in Croatian] (January 2012). "The Four Most Still". In Translation.
- Šćavina, Tomica [in Croatian] (2012). Kaleidoscope World.
- Drndić, Daša (2013). Trieste. MacLehose. ISBN 978-1780878355.
- Blažević-Kreitzman, Neda Miranda [in Croatian] (2014). "Marilyn Monroe, My Mother". Buenos Aires Review.
- Bodrožić, Ivana [in Croatian] (2017). The Hotel Tito. Seven Stories Press. ISBN 978-1609807955.
- Ugrešić, Dubravka [in Croatian] (2018). Fox. Open Letter. ISBN 978-1940953762. with David Williams

From Serbian

- Albahari, David (1996). Words Are Something Else. Northwestern University. ISBN 978-0810113060.
- Selenić, Slobodan [in Serbian] (2003). Fathers and Forefathers. Harvill. ISBN 978-1846554193.
- Albahari, David (2005). Götz and Meyer. Harcourt. ISBN 978-0151011414.
- Albahari, David (2005). Snow Man. Douglas & McIntyre. ISBN 978-1553650997.
- Albahari, David (2011). Leeches. Houghton Mifflin Harcourt. ISBN 978-0151015023.
- Albahari, David (2014). Learning Cyrillic: Stories. Dalkey Archive. ISBN 978-1628970906.
- Albahari, David (2014). Globetrotter. Yale University. ISBN 978-0300201321.

=== Other publications ===
- Good People in an Evil Time: Portraits of Complicity and Resistance in the Bosnian War. Other Press. 2005. ISBN 978-1590511961. (With Svetlana Broz and Laurie Kain Hart)
- Bosnian, Croatian, Serbian, a Textbook: With Exercises and Basic Grammar. University of Wisconsin. 2010. ISBN 978-0299236540. (With Ronelle Alexander)
- Translating Evidence and Interpreting Testimony at a War Crimes Tribunal: Working in a Tug-of-War. Palgrave. 2015. ISBN 978-1137332660.

== Awards ==
In 1998, Elias-Bursać received the AATSEEL Award for best translation from a Slavic or East European language for David Albahari's Words are Something Else. In 2006, she was given the National Translation Award for Albahari's Götz and Meyer. Her translation of Trieste by Daša Drndić won the Independent Foreign Fiction Readers' Prize in 2013.

The Association for Women in Slavic Studies recognized Translating Evidence and Interpreting Testimony at a War Crimes Tribunal: Working in a Tug-of-War with the Mary Zirin Prize in 2015.
