= Zaimović =

Zaimović is a surname. Notable people with the surname include:

- Dženan Zaimović (born 1973), Bosnian professional football manager and former player
- Karim Zaimović (1971–1995), Bosnian writer, journalist, and publicist
