= Another Story =

Another Story may refer to:

- Another Story (Courtney Pine album), released in 1998
- Another Story (Fiction Factory album), released in 1985
- Another Story (Stanley Turrentine album), released in 1969
- Another Story (Ernest Tubb album), released in 1967
- Official Another Story Clannad: On the Hillside Path that Light Watches Over, a Japanese visual novel
- Sailor Moon: Another Story, a video game released in 1995
- Another Story (Festival), annual literary event, taking place in Skopje, Republic of Macedonia
