= Strip Art Features =

Comics publisher

- Founded: 1971; 55 years ago in Bosnia and Herzegovina
- Founder: Ervin Rustemagić
- Headquarters: Krpanova 1, Celje, Slovenia
- Products: Comics; Intellectual property
- Subsidiaries: Platinum Studios
- Website: www.safcomics.com

Strip Art Features (SAF) is a comic-book publishing house and rights agent currently based in Celje, Slovenia. The company is known to the American public through its co-publishing arrangement with Dark Horse Comics.

== History ==
SAF was founded by 17-year-old Ervin Rustemagić in Sarajevo, Bosnia and Herzegovina in 1971. The rights agency component of SAF, known as Platinum Studios, developed a large, internationally oriented library of non-superhero properties. From its inception, the company focused on representing a broad range of genres and maintaining relationships with prominent European creators and publishers.

SAF's magazine Strip Art was the winner of the 1984 Lucca Comics & Games Yellow Kid Award for Best Foreign Comics Publisher.

In the early 1990s, SAF had offices in the Sarajevo suburb of Ilidža as well as in Doetinchem, the Netherlands.

With the beginning of the Bosnian war in early 1992, the SAF offices in Ilidža were destroyed by a Serbian bombardment. More than 14,000 pieces of original art were lost in the flames, including pieces by Americans Hal Foster, Doug Wildey, Joe Kubert, Warren Tufts, Sergio Aragonés, George McManus, Alex Raymond, Charles M. Schulz, Mort Walker, John Prentice, Al Williamson, Gordon Bess, and Bud Sagendorf; works by Argentinean artists such as Alberto Breccia and Carlos Meglia; and pieces by European creators like André Franquin, Maurice Tillieux, Hermann, Martin Lodewijk, Philippe Bercovici, Giorgio Cavazzano, John Burns, and Ferdinando Tacconi. After escaping Bosnia and Herzegovina, Rustemagić managed to reestablish SAF in Slovenia in late 1993.

SAF holds the English-language rights to Hermann Huppen's Jeremiah. After failing to reach American audiences in the 1980s and 1990s with such publishers as Fantagraphics, Catalan Communications, and Malibu Comics; Jeremiah (and SAF) found success with Dark Horse beginning in the 2000s. SAF and Dark Horse have released other titles together as well. In addition, via Rustemagić's partnership in 1997 with the former publisher of Malibu Comics, Scott Mitchell Rosenberg, Rustemagić co-founded an American iteration of Platinum Studios. As part of the arrangement, Platinum Studios acquired the film and television rights to Jeremiah, which was eventually adapted into a science-fiction TV series which ran on Showtime from 2002 to 2004. (Rustemagić left the Platinum Studios, Inc. partnership in 2000.)

In 2004, SAF signed a distribution deal with the American company Diamond Comic Distributors.

SAF founder Ervin Rustemagić died in Slovenia in 1995 at the age of 73.

== See also ==
- Fax from Sarajevo
