= Fathers and Forefathers =

Novel by Slobodan Selenić

- First edition cover
- Author: Slobodan Selenić
- Original title: Očevi i oci
- Translator: Ellen Elias-Bursać
- Publication date: January 1, 1985

Fathers and Forefathers is a novel written by the Serbian author Slobodan Selenić (Serb: Слободан Селенић). In the UK, it is published by Harvill Press, an imprint of Random House.

Although the novel is set many years ago, it deals with what many consider to be a very current theme---that of the clash, or at least the juxtaposition, of two cultures (in this case the culture clash between English culture and Serbian culture), and the subsequent alienation of the individuals involved. It has sold over 100,000 copies in Serbia.

== Summary ==
The novel is set in Belgrade, just before World War II, and it covers over fifty years of Serbian history. It tells the story of a young Englishwoman, Elizabeth, and Steven, a Serb who meet at University in England and fall in love. They leave England to begin a new life together in Serbia. Through Elizabeth's letters home it is revealed that she is having difficulties adapting to Serbian culture, although Steven's narrative provides a very different take on events. Their son, Mihajlo, is ashamed of his mixed parentage and rebels radically against his English roots. On the eve of the war, the family's loyalties are tested and tragedy ensues.
