= List of Jeremiah episodes =

The following is a list of episodes for the American-Canadian post-apocalyptic action-drama television series Jeremiah, starring Luke Perry and Malcolm-Jamal Warner that ran on the Showtime network from 2002 to 2004. The series takes place in a future wherein the adult population has been wiped out by a deadly virus.

The series ended production in 2003, after the management of Showtime decided they were not interested in producing science fiction programming anymore. Had the series continued, it would have run under a different showrunner than Straczynski, who decided to leave following the completion of the production of the second season due to creative differences between him and MGM Television.

Episodes for the final half of the second season did not begin airing in the United States until September 3, 2004.

== Series overview ==
Season	Episodes	Season premiere	Season finale
1	20	March 3, 2002	July 19, 2002
2	15	October 10, 2003	January 19, 2004 (Canada) September 24, 2004 (US)

== Episodes ==
=== Season 1 (2002) ===
No. overall	No. in season	Title	Directed by	Written by	Original release date
1	1	"The Long Road"	Russell Mulcahy	J. Michael Straczynski	March 3, 2002
2	2	"The Long Road"	Russell Mulcahy	J. Michael Straczynski	March 3, 2002
Jeremiah, a loner who lives on the road, meets up with Kurdy, another loner. The two make their way to Clairfield, a small market community run by the ruthless and beautiful Theo, in the hope that they can find out about a mysterious place called the Valhalla Sector. There they meet Simon, a man who claims to know the whereabouts of the "End of the World", a place where the old world is still intact. Simon gives them a map and an entry key and asks them to pass on an important message. Markus, the leader of the Thunder Mountain group, asks them to take up Simon's work.
3	3	"Man of Iron, Woman Under Glass"	Brett Dowler	J. Michael Straczynski	March 15, 2002
Jeremiah and Kurdy meet a man who believes himself to be a superhero. They help him save his sister from being raped, but he is killed in the process. Meanwhile, Markus, the leader of Thunder Mountain, has hidden an adult from before the Big Death in a glass room.
4	4	"...And the Ground, Sown with Salt"	Peter DeLuise	J. Michael Straczynski	March 22, 2002
Jeremiah and Kurdy find an Army base led by a man who believes that he replaces God, and wants to find out the location of Thunder Mountain.
5	5	"To Sail Beyond the Stars"	Neill Fearnley	J. Michael Straczynski	March 29, 2002
Jeremiah and Kurdy meet a woman who is saving up gasoline to try sailing her boat across the ocean while they are in a town trying to track down one of their predecessor's contacts. They also encounter mysterious people in biohazard suits who are burning down settlements.
6	6	"The Bag"	Michael Robison	Sam Egan	April 5, 2002
A travelling doctor visits a town where Jeremiah and Kurdy find a man who was used for testing a vaccine for the Big Death.
7	7	"City of Roses"	James Head	Sam Egan	April 12, 2002
Kurdy visits his old home, from prior to the Big Death. Jeremiah searches for a vaccine which could inoculate against the Big Death. Kurdy remembers some dark secrets from his childhood regarding his parents' deaths.
8	8	"Firewall"	Peter Deluise	J. Michael Straczynski	April 19, 2002
Jeremiah and Kurdy capture an old man, over 50 years of age after they hear of people in protective clothing abducting people. The man, Major Quantrell, who is identified by Markus, had originally worked at Thunder Mountain. Quantrell reveals he is with Valhalla Sector.
9	9	"The Red Kiss"	James Head	Sam Egan	April 26, 2002
Children are being abducted at an old fairground; the children believe it to be Vampires and that Jeremiah is their saviour.
10	10	"Journeys End in Lovers Meeting"	Martin Wood	J. Michael Straczynski	May 3, 2002
Jeremiah and Kurdy befriend a group of people on a pilgrimage to another life.
11	11	"Thieves' Honor"	Holly Dale	Sam Egan	May 10, 2002
Jeremiah and Kurdy return to Clairfield, but someone in Thunder Mountain has leaked their mission. They encounter Theo just as she faces revolt from her own people.
12	12	"The Touch"	Michael Robison	Sam Egan	May 17, 2002
Jeremiah and Kurdy visit a village where physical contact is outlawed.
13	13	"Mother of Invention"	Neill Fearnley	Sara Barnes & A. L. Katz	May 24, 2002
Jeremiah and Kurdy visit a self-sufficient community with the hope of setting up an alliance. Jeremiah finds an old friend, the person who first started him writing to his father.
14	14	"Tripwire"	Neill Fearnley	J. Michael Straczynski	May 31, 2002
The Thunder Mountain team help out a settlement, hoping to receive intelligence should Valhalla Sector come that way. Jeremiah encounters his 'brother' Ezekiel and learns more of the fate of his father.
15	15	"Ring of Truth"	Ken Girotti	Sam Egan	June 7, 2002
Jeremiah and Kurdy travel to meet again with Theo. They don't find her but they do find trouble in a brothel and end up helping out the circus.
16	16	"Moon in Gemini"	Brad Turner	Sam Egan	June 14, 2002
Jeremiah and Erin go to help Erin's twin sister after a message asking for help. Kurdy and Elizabeth travel to offer help to a Black Power group who have sought isolation.
17	17	"Out of the Ashes"	Brad Turner	Sam Egan	June 28, 2002
Jeremiah and Kurdy go to Denver in order to obtain new books. Kurdy saves the library from extremists and Jeremiah meets up with an old friend.
18	18	"A Means to an End"	Mike Vejar	Sara Barnes	July 5, 2002
Jeremiah and Kurdy are told to bring Theo to Thunder Mountain, as part of Markus' plans to unite the local community leaders. Not all of Thunder Mountain agrees, though, and some plot to discredit Markus and his plan.
19	19	"Things Left Unsaid: Part 1"	Mike Vejar	J. Michael Straczynski	July 12, 2002
Jeremiah and Kurdy learn that Lee Chen is a spy who's been keeping information about the Big Death from Markus. They soon learn of a group of adults who had natural immunity to the Big Death and have been collecting information about the disease's origin and imminent return... and the truth about Valhalla Sector.
20	20	"Things Left Unsaid: Part 2"	Mike Vejar	J. Michael Straczynski	July 19, 2002
Markus attempts to hold a huge meeting of community leaders in St. Louis, to form a government, but Valhalla Sector already knows about it. Kurdy tries to find help for Elizabeth, who is dying from gunshot wounds, and Jeremiah goes to the Valhalla Sector-controlled town of Milhaven in search of answers of his own.

=== Season 2 (2003–04) ===
No. overall	No. in season	Title	Directed by	Written by	Original release date
21	1	"Letters From the Other Side: Part 1"	Martin Wood	J. Michael Straczynski	October 10, 2003
Markus, Erin, and Jeremiah have been taken into captivity at Valhalla Sector. Jeremiah endures torture to keep VS from obtaining the vaccine for the Big Death. Meanwhile, Kurdy must decide whether to trust Lee Chen again. Chen admits he was a double agent, but claims to be on Thunder Mountain's side, and he has a plan to rescue their friends.
22	2	"Letters From the Other Side: Part 2"	Martin Wood	J. Michael Straczynski	October 17, 2003
Lee Chen plans to release the Big Death again, while Kurdy takes on the responsibility of command and leads men into battle, to make sure the virus is contained. The mysterious Mr. Smith is determined to help him.
23	3	"Strange Attractors"	Charles Winkler	J. Michael Straczynski	October 24, 2003
Jeremiah and Libby go to Milhaven to save the leaders, including Theo. Libby, with her previous knowledge of Milhaven helps Jeremiah save everybody by posing as members of Valhalla Sector. It is decided that Jeremiah will later oversee the rebuilding of Milhaven, once things calm down.
24	4	"Deus Ex Machina"	Mike Vejar	J. Michael Straczynski	October 31, 2003
Markus tried to bring order out of chaos but is meeting resistance from the new young leaders. Theo is his unlikely choice for a possible ally but she has a surprising reason for being preoccupied. One person everyone at the leaders' meeting seems to have heard of, but never seen, is the mysterious Daniel who controls an area on the East Coast. When his representative arrives, Theo makes an astonishing declaration that sets new wheels in motion.
25	5	"Rites of Passage"	Martin Wood	Sara Barnes	October 31, 2003
Devon arrives at Thunder Mountain and Jeremiah is looking forward to spending time with him, but Jeremiah wonders what happened to his mother. Libby knows and gives Jeremiah a letter Devon entrusted to her long ago.
26	6	"The Mysterious Mister Smith"	Mike Vejar	J. Michael Straczynski	November 7, 2003
Jeremiah begins his job of supervising Millhaven, but finds he is tired of being a hero and just wants to let things slide. A disturbing new activity involving Daniel's group, however, forces him to make a stand again. Back at Thunder Mountain, Kurdy finds Smith has been lying, spying, and telling stories of Kurdy's operations to strangers, but has a very good reason for all of it.
27	7	"Voices in the Dark"	Martin Wood	J. Michael Straczynski	November 7, 2003
Libby saves Jeremiah from an assassination attempt plotted by Daniel's forces. In the aftermath, he and Libby start a physical relationship, and Jeremiah covertly goes against Markus' orders by asking Kurdy and Smith go with him inside Daniel's territory to New York City. There they meet a resistance who ask their help in smuggling out a defector from Daniel's inner circle.
28	8	"Crossing Jordan"	Mario Azzopardi	J. Michael Straczynski	December 1, 2003 (Canada) / September 3, 2004 (US)
The Alliance recruits another town, Ridgeway, to its side, but when Sims, one of the leaders in Daniel's army hears about it, he decides to make an example out of them, enslaving the populace and burning the town. Smith struggles with information from God about Libby. When he's left alone with her during Sims' attack on another town considering the Alliance, he makes a startling discovery, and must take drastic action.
29	9	"Running on Empty"	Martin Wood	J. Michael Straczynski	December 8, 2003 (Canada) / September 3, 2004 (US)
Jeremiah sets off to find Sims to avenge Libby's death. He later joins Kurdy and Markus to try to find Daniel's raiders. Mister Smith gives Erin a message from God.
30	10	"The Question"	Mario Azzopardi	J. Michael Straczynski	December 15, 2003 (Canada) / September 10, 2004 (US)
Smith tells the group they will each be granted a miracle, but all the men doubt Smiths prediction. Marcus enlists the alliance towns leaders for recruits of soldiers and Kurdy begin to train an army against Daniel and his men.
31	11	"The Past Is Prologue"	Mike Vejar	J. Michael Straczynski	December 22, 2003 (Canada) / September 10, 2004 (US)
Jeremiah gets captured in a town that looks just like towns did before the Big Death, but he tricks his way free with the other captives.
32	12	"The Face in the Mirror"	Sean Astin	J. Michael Straczynski & Sara Barnes	December 29, 2003 (Canada) / September 17, 2004
A Big Death survivor named Frederick Monash (Matthew Walker) knows the truth about Daniel. Thunder Mountain wants to find Frederick before Daniel's forces can kill him. The truth is that Daniel isn't real. Monash and others created the figure of "Daniel" with the intention of being a charismatic force that would challenge Valhalla Sector's secretive tactics, but after its demise, some on the group intended on ruling, putting Monash aside. The Leaders of Daniel agree to start war against the Alliance.
33	13	"State of the Union"	Milan Cheylov	Sara Barnes	January 5, 2004 (Canada) / September 17, 2004 (US)
Jeremiah, Kurdy, and Mr. Smith bring radios to a town that, unknown to them, are part of the plans of Daniel's army to strike against Thunder Mountain's alliance by blocking all communications. In a fit of guilt Smith admits to Kurdy what happened to Libby. The Army of Daniel is prepared to strike at Thunder Mountain.
34	14	"Interregnum: Parts 1 & 2"	Mike Vejar	J. Michael Straczynski	January 12, 2004 (p1) January 19, 2004 (p2) (Canada) / September 24, 2004 (US)
35	15	"Interregnum: Parts 1 & 2"	Mike Vejar	J. Michael Straczynski	January 12, 2004 (p1) January 19, 2004 (p2) (Canada) / September 24, 2004 (US)
Someone on the inside has been sabotaging things at Thunder Mountain and Lee Chen is in charge of the investigation. Mister Smith leads Jeremiah and Kurdy to a small town full of smart children, who will need defending. Jeremiah learns the truth about Libby's death, and Daniel's army strikes at Thunder Mountain itself, both inside and out. Markus matches wits with Sims, and he and Erin take on those inside the mountain. Kurdy leads the defense of Millhaven against Daniel's Army. Jeremiah sets out to finally kill Sims. Smith reunites with his daughter, while Frank documents it all.
