= David Albahari =

Serbian writer and translator (1948–2023)

David Albahari Давид Албахари
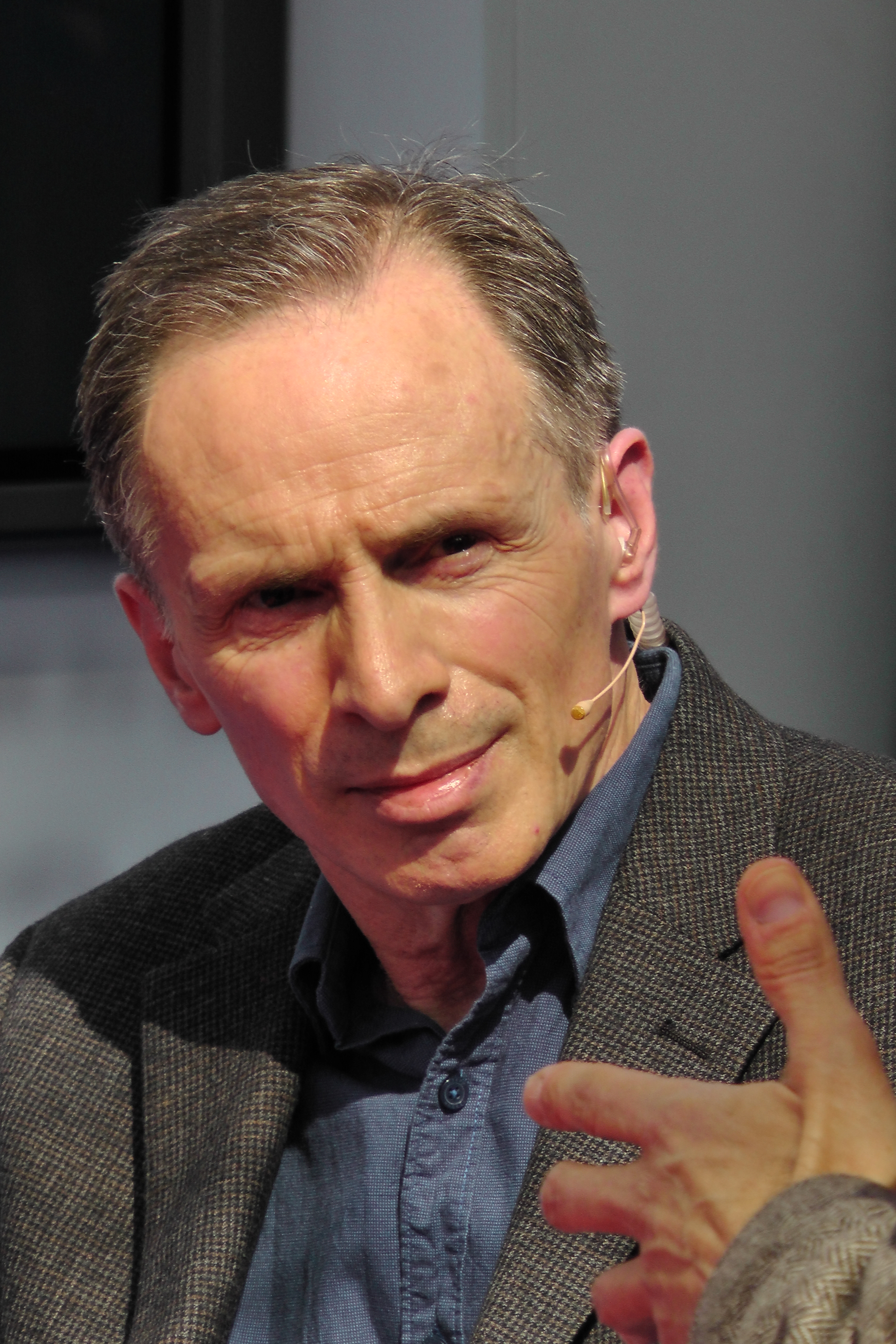
- Albahari in 2011
- Born: 15 March 1948; Peć, PR Serbia, FPR Yugoslavia
- Died: 30 July 2023 (aged 75); Belgrade, Serbia
- Education: University of Belgrade Faculty of Philology
- Occupations: Writer, novelist
- Children: Natan Albahari; Rebeka Albahari

David Albahari (Serbian Cyrillic: Давид Албахари, pronounced [dǎv̞id albaxǎːriː]; 15 March 1948 – 30 July 2023) was a Serbian novelist.

Albahari wrote mainly novels and short stories in the Serbian language. He was also an established translator from English into Serbian. He was a member of the Serbian Academy of Sciences and Arts and a University of Belgrade graduate. Albahari was awarded the prestigious NIN Award for the best novel of 1996 for Mamac (Bait). He was among the award's finalists on seven other occasions.

== Biography ==
David Albahari was born on 15 March 1948 in Peć, in the former Yugoslav region of Kosovo to a Sephardic Jewish father and a mother of Serbian origin (who had previously been married to an Ashkenazi Jewish man killed in the Holocaust, as were their children and as was the first family of his father, which Albahari himself defined as "Four children had to die so that I, and my sister, would be born.").

Albahari published the first collection of short stories Porodično vreme ("Family Time") in 1973. He became better known to wider audience in 1982 with a volume Opis smrti ("A Description of Death") for which he got the Andrić Prize. In 1991 he became the chair of the Federation of Jewish Communes of Yugoslavia, and worked on evacuation of the Jewish population from besieged Sarajevo. In 1994, he moved with his family to Calgary in the Canadian province of Alberta, where he lived until 2012 when he returned to live in Belgrade. He continued to write and publish in the Serbian language.

In the late 1980s, Albahari initiated the first formal petition to legalize marijuana in Yugoslavia.

Albahari died after a long illness in Belgrade on 30 July 2023, at the age of 75.

== Awards ==
In 2012 he was awarded the Vilenica Prize. He also received the following awards: the Andrić Prize (1982), Stanislav Vinaver Award (1993), NIN Prize (1996), National Library of Serbia Award for bestseller (1996), International Balkanika Award (1996), Bridge Berlin Award (1998), City of Belgrade Award (2005) and Isidora Sekulić Award (2014).

On 29 July 2016, Albahari won the first award at the "Druga prikazna" ("Another Story") literary festival in Skopje, Macedonia.

Albahari was a contributor to Geist magazine.

== Selected bibliography ==
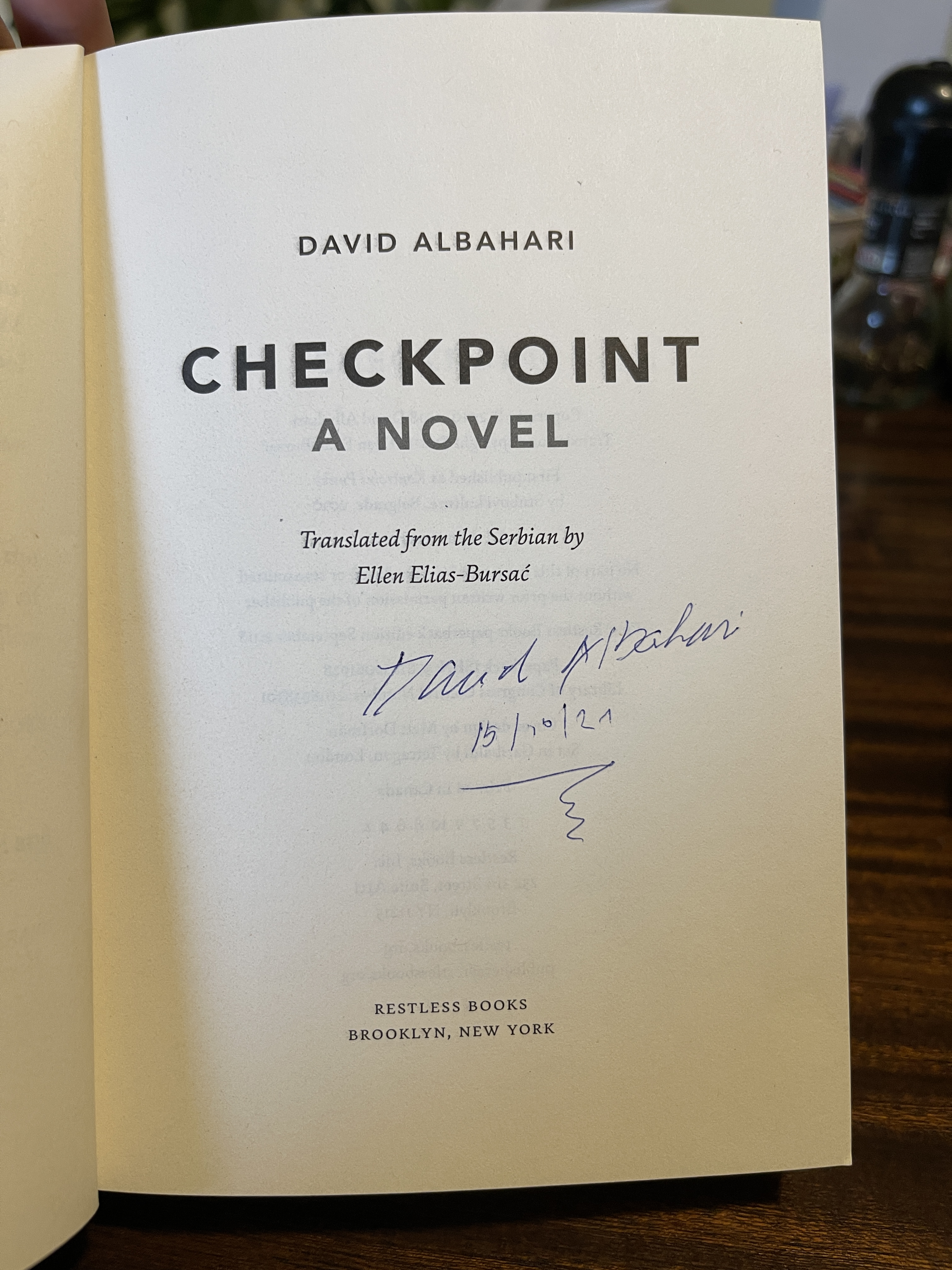
Signed book by the author - David Albahari - ″Checkpoint″; Source: Adligat

His books have been translated into several languages and several of them are available in English.

=== Novels ===
- "Cink" (1988). Tsing, trans. David Albahari (Northwestern University Press, 1997)
- "Snežni čovek" (1995). Snow Man, trans. Ellen Elias-Bursać (Douglas & McIntyre, 2005)
- "Mamac" (1996). Bait, trans. Peter Agnone (Northwestern University Press, 2001)
- "Gec i Majer" (1998). Götz and Meyer, trans. Ellen Elias-Bursać (Harvill, 2004; Harcourt, 2005; Dalkey Archive, 2015)
- "Svetski putnik" (2001). Globetrotter, trans. Ellen Elias-Bursać (Yale University Press, 2014)
- "Pijavice" (2005). Leeches, trans. Ellen Elias-Bursać (Mariner Books, 2011)
- "Kontrolni punkt" (2011). Checkpoint, trans. Ellen Elias-Bursać (Restless Books, 2018)
- "Životinjsko carstvo" (2014)
- "Danas je sreda" (2017)
- "Pogovor" (2021)

=== Compilations in English ===
- Words Are Something Else, ed. Tomislav Longinović; trans. Ellen Elias-Bursać (Northwestern University Press, 1996). Selections from collections published between 1973 and 1993.
- Learning Cyrillic: Stories, trans. Ellen Elias-Bursać (Geopoetika, 2012; Dalkey Archive, 2014). Selections from collections published between 1997 and 2009.
