= Natan Albahari =

Serbian politician and activist

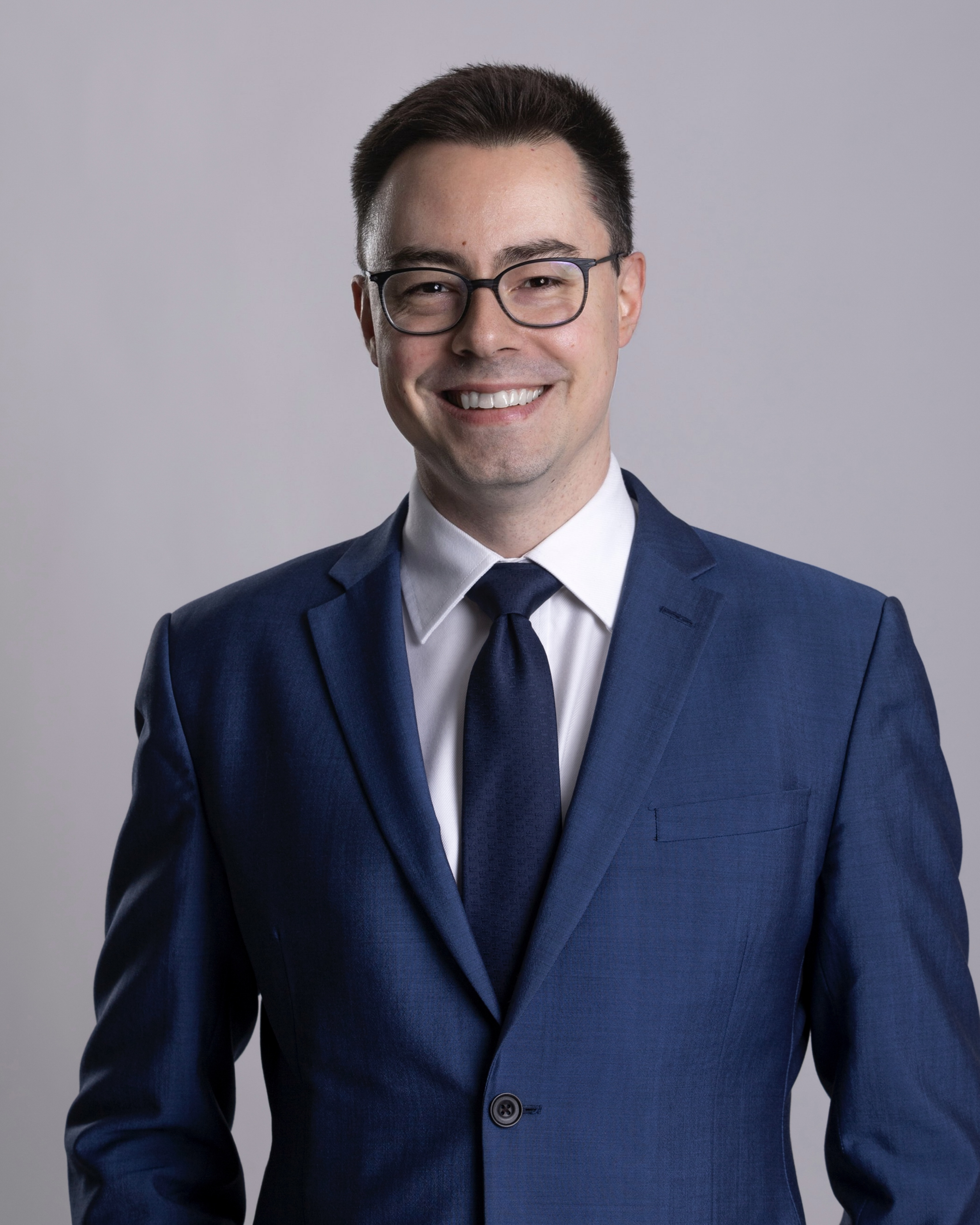

Member of the National Assembly
- In office 1 August 2022 – 6 February 2024
- President: Vladimir Orlić

Personal details
- Born: 1986 (age 39–40) SFR Yugoslavia
- Party: PSG (2017–present)
- Parent: David Albahari (father)
- Education: University of Calgary; University of Bonn

Natan Albahari (Serbian Cyrillic: Натан Албахари; born 1986) is a Serbian politician and activist served as a member of the National Assembly of Serbia from 1 August 2022 to 6 February 2024. He has served as the member of the presidency and international secretary of the Movement of Free Citizens (PSG) since September 2024.

== Biography ==
Albahari was born to a Serbian Jewish family in 1986 in SFR Yugoslavia. His father is David Albahari, an awarded writer. In 1994, Albahari and his family emigrated to Canada.

He completed his undergraduate studies at the Faculty of Political Sciences at the University of Calgary, and obtained his master's degree in European Integration at the Center for European Integration Studies at the University of Bonn.

He has been employed at the ISAC Fund since 2008 and holds the position of program manager. He was previously engaged in that organization as a project associate and as a project manager. He is in charge of organizing programs dealing with Serbia's European and Euro-Atlantic integration, such as international conferences, seminars, study visits and trainings, political advocacy and other activities that fall within the domain of parallel diplomacy. Within the National Convention on the EU, he serves as the deputy chair of the Chapter 31 Working Group

He is an occasional lecturer at the Belgrade Open School and so far has held several presentations for various study groups, NGOs and high school students in Serbia on the topic of the European Union, NATO and security sector reform.

=== Political career ===
He joined the newly formed liberal Movement of Free Citizens (PSG) in 2017.

In August 2017, he was named the president of PSG's foreign policy committee.

In the fall of 2019, he was the representative of PSG in all three rounds of the inter-party parliamentary dialogue, held between the ruling parties and the opposition in the National Assembly under the auspices of the European Union. He also attended all meetings with the EU and international actors on behalf of PSG. He was elected a member of the presidency of the Movement of Free Citizens by a majority vote at the Assembly held on 27 September 2020.

He was given the 32nd position on the United for the Victory of Serbia electoral list for the 2022 Serbian parliamentary election. The list won 38 seats and Albahari was elected to the National Assembly.

In May 2022, Albahari, on behalf of PSG, voted for the accession of the Democratic Party of Kosovo (PDK), founded by Hashim Thaçi, to the Liberal South East European Network (LIBSEEN).

On 1 June 2022, during the Russian invasion of Ukraine, Albahari voiced his opposition to Sergey Lavrov's upcoming visit to Belgrade, stating that "it does not mean that we should not have relations with Russia, but when Russia kills civilians and we do not see the end of the war Lavrov has no place in Belgrade, so Serbia would give the wrong signal to our allies from the West and the EU".
