= Senka Marić =

Bosnian writer (born 1972)

Senka Marić (born 1972) is a Bosnian writer. She is best known for her work as a poet and for her 2018 novel Kintsugi Tijela, which draws from the author's own experiences with breast cancer. Marić is also co-founder and editor-in-chief of the literary journal Strane.

== Biography ==
Senka Marić was born in Mostar, a city in southern Bosnia and Herzegovina, in 1972. She began writing poetry when she was eight years old. After finishing secondary school, she studied theater education and comparative literature at the Faculty of Humanities, University of Mostar, and the Faculty of Philosophy, University of Sarajevo.

From 1991 to 1997, Marić fled the Bosnian War and lived in the United Kingdom, where she trained as a stylist at the Vidal Sassoon Academy in London.

After the war, she returned to Mostar, where she now works as a poet, novelist, translator, and journal editor. She runs the online literary journal Strane, which she co-founded in 2014 with Almin Kaplan and Srđan Gavrilović. Marić, who writes in Bosnian, also translates others' writing from English.

Marić is a breast cancer survivor, and her work frequently deals with this experience.

She has published three books of poetry: Odavde do nigdje ("From Here to Nowhere", 1997), To su samo riječi ("These Are Just Words", 2005), and Do smrti naredne ("Until the Next Death", 2016). Her debut novel, Kintsugi Tijela, was published in 2018; it is based on the author's own experience with cancer, with the novel's narrator reexamining her childhood as she deals with illness and treatment. In 2019, it won the Meša Selimović prize, a major literary award for novels published in Bosnia and Herzegovina, Croatia, Montenegro, and Serbia. Kintsugi Tijela has been translated into English by Celia Hawkesworth, and was published by Peirene Press under the title Body Kintsugi in late 2022; it became the first Bosnian winner of the PEN Translates award in 2021.

Marić has also twice received the Zija Dizdarević short story award, the top prize for short fiction in the country, in 2000 and 2013. Critics have counted Marić as part of the first generation of female writers in Bosnia and Herzegovina who are not considered outliers because of their gender.

== Selected works ==
- Odavde do nigdje (poetry, 1997)
- To su samo riječi (poetry, 2005)
- Do smrti naredne (poetry, 2016)
- Kintsugi Tijela (novel, 2018)
