= Daša Drndić =

Croatian writer

- Born: 10 August 1946; Zagreb, PR Croatia, FPR Yugoslavia
- Died: June 5, 2018 (aged 71); Rijeka, Croatia
- Occupation: novelist
- Writing career
- Period: 1982–2018

Daša Drndić (10 August 1946 – 5 June 2018) was a Croatian writer. She studied English language and literature at the University of Belgrade.

== Life and career ==
Drndić was born in Zagreb, Yugoslavia in 1947 into a middle-class family. Her father, a former partisan, was a diplomat working in Egypt, Sudan and Sweden and her mother worked as a psychiatrist. Drndić grew up in both Croatia and Serbia, with her father eventually moving the family to Belgrade.

At University of Belgrade, Drndić studied philology. She then obtained a master's degree in theatre and communications from Southern Illinois University in the United States, which she attended with the aid of a Fulbright scholarship. She studied at Case Western Reserve University. In the early 1990s, she moved from Belgrade to Rijeka, and obtained her doctorate at the University of Rijeka, where she later taught. She worked for many years in the drama department of Radio Belgrade, writing and producing numerous radio plays during that time. She also worked in publishing. In 2017, she signed the Declaration on the Common Language of the Croats, Serbs, Bosniaks and Montenegrins.

== Books ==
The author of a number of books, Drndić is best known for her award-winning novel Sonnenschein (2007), translated into English as Trieste (2012). It was nominated for the Independent Foreign Fiction Prize. An earlier novel, Leica format, was translated by Celia Hawkesworth and published by MacLehose Press in 2015. In 2017, her penultimate novel, Belladonna, was published in English by MacLehose Press and New Directions Publishing (also translated by Hawkesworth). An English translation by Hawkesworth and Susan Curtis of Drndić's earlier work Doppelgänger was published in Great Britain by Istros Books in 2018, and in the United States by New Directions in 2019. Her last book, EEG, translated into English by Celia Hawkesworth, was published by MacLehose Press in the UK and New Directions in the US in 2019. EEG won the Best Translated Book Award in 2020.

== Death ==
Drndić died on 5 June 2018 in Rijeka, aged 71, after a two-year battle with cancer.

== Selected works ==
- Put do subote (1982). Way to Saturday.
- Kamen s neba (1984). Stone from Heaven.
- Marija Częstohowska još uvijek roni suze ili Umiranje u Torontu (1997). Maria Częstohowska Still Shedding Tears or Dying in Toronto.
- Canzone di guerra (1998). Battle Songs, trans. Celia Hawkesworth (Istros Books, 2022; New Directions, 2023).
- Totenwande (2000).
- Doppelgänger (2002). Trans. S.D. Curtis and Celia Hawkesworth (Istros Books/New Directions, 2019).
- Leica format (2003). Trans. Celia Hawkesworth (MacLehose Press, 2015).
- Sonnenschein (2007). Trieste, trans. Ellen Elias-Bursać (MacLehose Press/Harcourt, 2012).
- April u Berlinu (2009). April in Berlin.
- Belladonna (2012). Trans. Celia Hawkesworth (MacLehose Press/New Directions, 2017).
- EEG (2016). Trans. Celia Hawkesworth (MacLehose Press/New Directions, 2019).
