= Olja Savičević =

Croatian novelist, poet and playwright (born 1974)

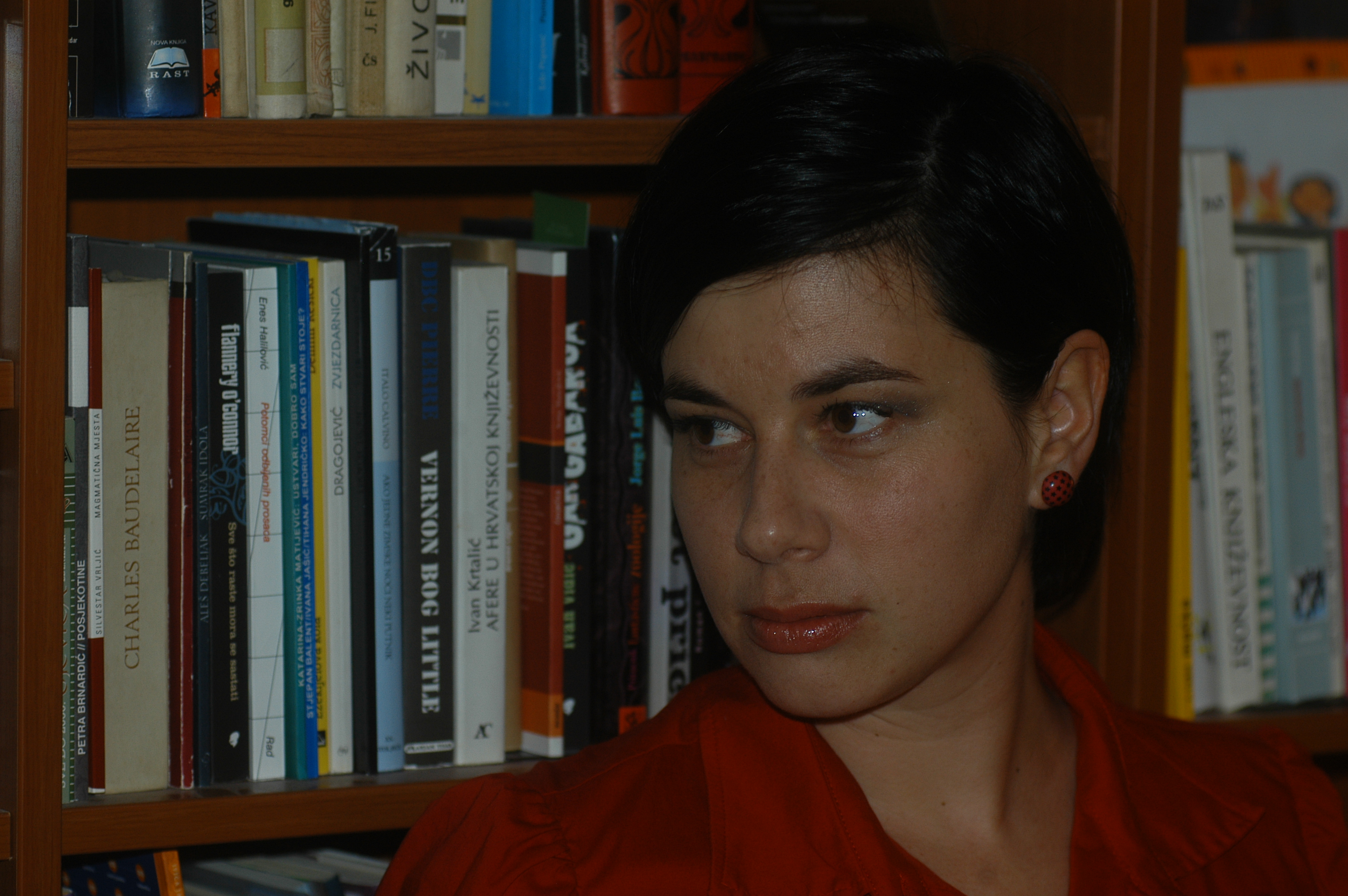
Image of Olja Savičević Ivančević

Olja Savičević Ivančević (born 1974 in Split) is a Croatian novelist, poet and playwright. She is a winner of the Grand Prize of the Druga prikazna Macedonian Literary Festival (2018), the T-Portal Award for Best Novel (2011), and the Mali Marulić prize for theatre (2013, 2014).

== Life and career ==
Olja Savičević was born on 16 September 1974 in Split, Yugoslavia. She obtained a bachelor's degree in linguistics and literary criticism from the University of Zadar. She then worked as a freelance writer for online publications, and as a teacher.

Savičević began her literary career with poetry, publishing a collection Biti će strašno kada ja porastem in 1988. This was followed by Vječna djeca (1993) and Žensko pismo (1999). A short story collection, Nasmijati psa, came out in 2006. Her first novel, Adio kauboju was published in 2010. Its translation into several languages was received with acclaim. Another novel, Pjevač u noći, came out in 2016.

Savičević received the Ranko Marinkovic award for the best short story in 2007. Adio kauboju won the T-Portal award for Croatian novel of the year 2011.

Savičević has also written and adapted dramas for children. Her dramatisation of Čudnovate zgode Šegrta Hlapića won the Mali Marulić award in 2013.

In 2017, Savičević has signed the Declaration on the Common Language of the Croats, Serbs, Bosniaks and Montenegrins.

== Selected works ==
=== Novels ===
- Adio kauboju [Farewell, Cowboy]. Translated by Celia Hawkesworth. Istros. 2015. ISBN 978-1908236487.
- Pjevač u noći. Sandorf. 2016. ISBN 978-9537715922.

=== Poetry ===
- Bit će strašno kada ja porastem. 1988.
- Žensko pismo. 1999.
- Mamasafari. Translated by Andrea Jurjević. Lavender Ink. 2018. ISBN 978-1944884383.

=== Short stories ===
- Nasmijati psa [To Make a Dog Laugh]. 2006.
