= Svetlana Broz =

Bosnian author and physician (1955–2025)

Svetlana Broz Светлана Броз
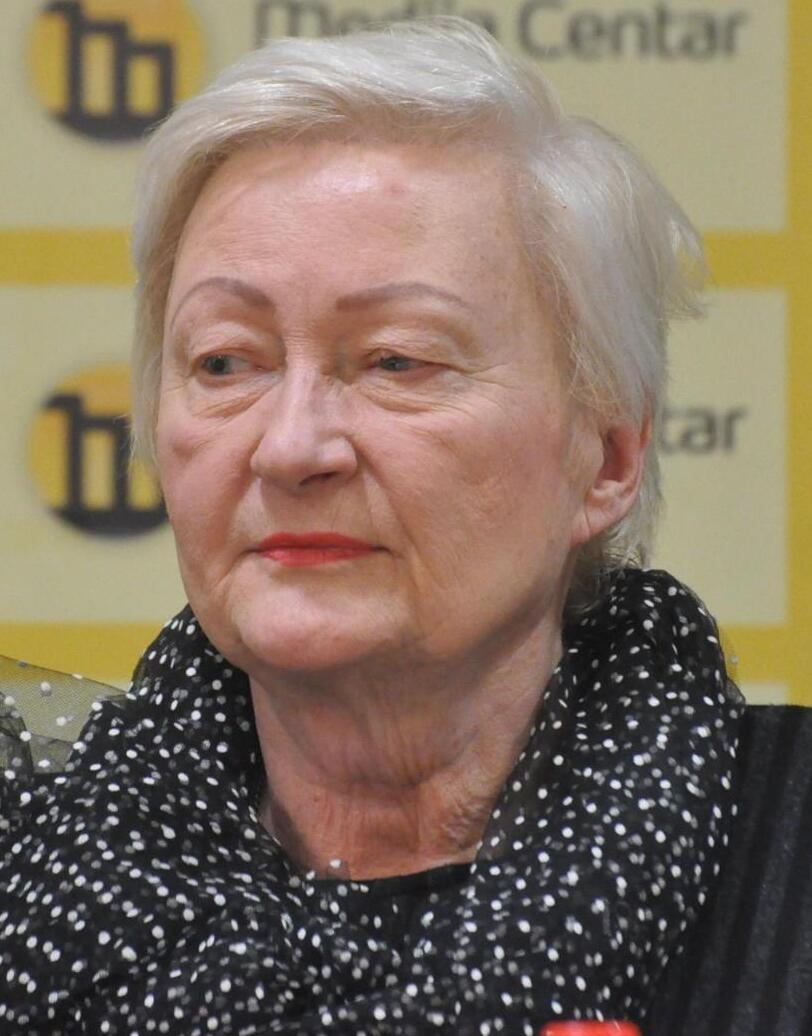
- Broz in 2023
- Born: 7 July 1955; Belgrade, PR Serbia, FPR Yugoslavia
- Died: 22 March 2025 (aged 69); Belgrade, Serbia
- Education: University of Belgrade (MB)
- Occupations: Author and physician
- Children: 2
- Relatives: Josip Broz Tito (grandfather)

Svetlana Broz (Serbo-Croatian Cyrillic: Светлана Броз; 7 July 1955 – 22 March 2025) was a Bosnian author and physician who specialised in cardiology. She was the granddaughter of the Yugoslav leader Josip Broz Tito.

== Biography ==
Svetlana Broz was born 7 July 1955 in Belgrade, then the capital of Yugoslavia (now the capital city of Serbia), the youngest child of Žarko Leon Broz (1924–1995), Josip Broz Tito's eldest son, and Zlata Jelinek-Broz from Tuzla. As a teenager, Broz worked as a free-lance journalist from 1970 to 1975; many of her articles and interviews were published in newspapers and magazines.

She graduated from the Belgrade Medical School in 1980, and had served as a cardiologist at the Military Medical Academy from 1981 to 1999, and volunteered her services at the outbreak of the war in Bosnia and Herzegovina in 1992. Her newest project was about inter-ethnic marriages entered into during the war. At the outbreak of the war in Bosnia and Herzegovina in 1992 she volunteered to work as a cardiologist in the atrocity zones. Over and over again her patients told her how their survival had been possible only thanks to individuals with the courage to stand up against the ethnic violence perpetrated by members of their own ethnic group, and in January 1993 she began interviewing for the book that describes these human experiences during the Bosnian War. The book was published in Bosnia and Herzegovina in 1999 with a title Dobri ljudi u vremenu zla and in 2003 in the United States under the title Good People in an Evil Time.

In 2000, she moved to Sarajevo, Bosnia and Herzegovina permanently. The reason for this was, as she stated in a 2005 interview for Bosnian daily newspaper Nezavisne novine: "After the NATO intervention, I moved to Sarajevo. Twenty years ago, Belgrade was a European metropolis, a city that I loved a lot. Unfortunately, in a way that city has lost its soul. Sarajevo, despite going through a four-year-long siege of hell, kept its soul intact. I love Bosnia and Herzegovina, I feel as this is my homeland. Last year I even became a citizen."

Broz died in Belgrade on 22 March 2025, at the age of 69.

== Career ==
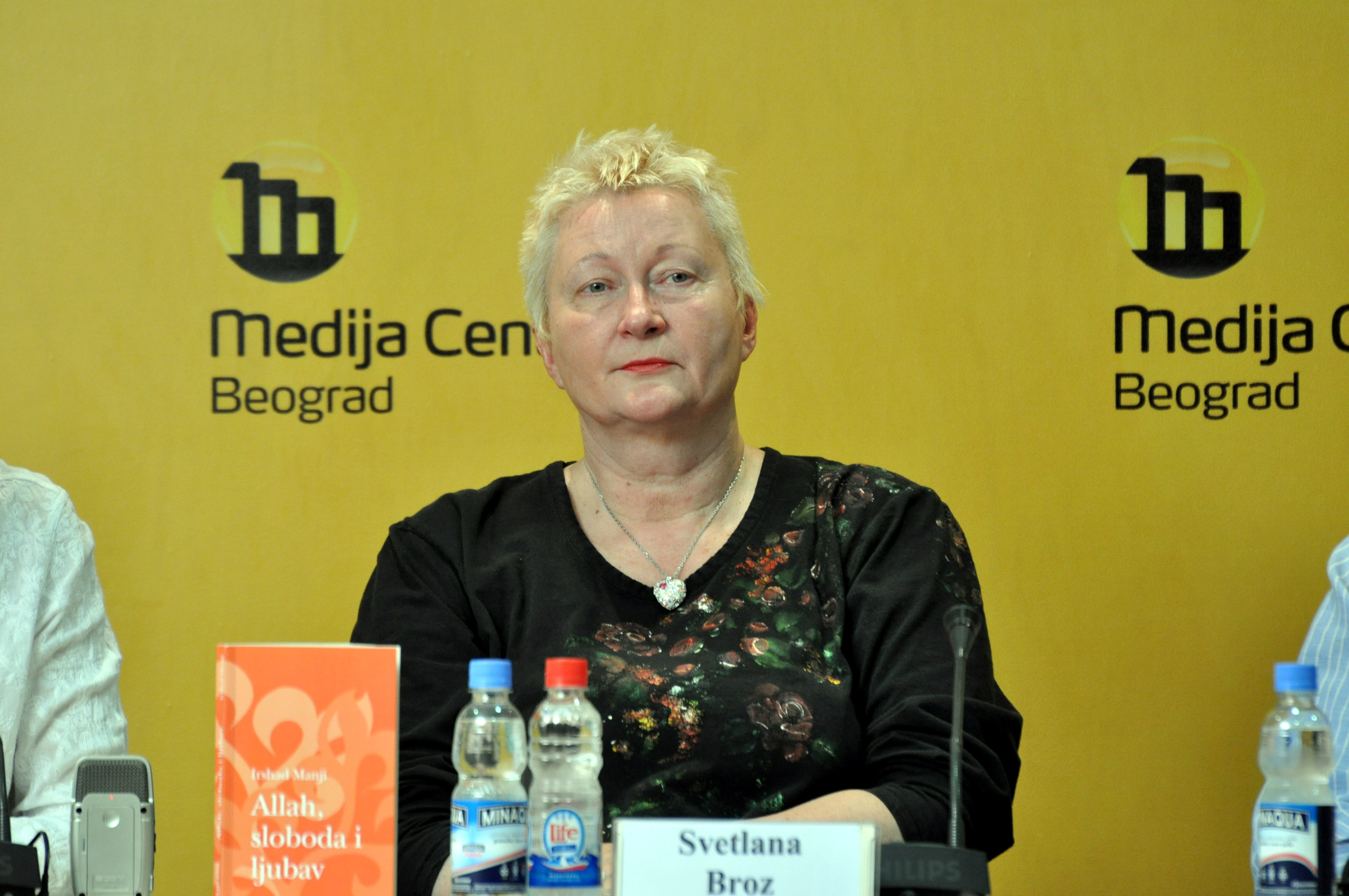
Broz at a press conference in 2012

Broz was the head of the local branch of the Gardens of the Righteous Worldwide (GARIWO) non-governmental organization. She was the founder of "Education Towards Civil Courage", a series of seminars designed to teach adolescents from all over the Balkans how to stand up to corruption and social and political divisiveness. In 2007, the organization began research and preparation for the foundation of a Center for Civil Courage in Bosnia-Herzegovina.

From 2001, Broz headed the organization GARIWO (technically a subsidiary of the Italian non-profit body Gardens of the Righteous Worldwide) with its flagship program Education on Civil Courage.

When her colleague and Director of Summer School of Civil Courage, Professor Duško Kondor was assassinated on 22 February 2007. Broz launched, in Duško's memory, the annual Duško Kondor Civil Courage Awards. Over the course of the 6 years of its existence, this prestigious award was given to 30 laureates.

She organized lectures and edited and published 14 books on civil courage translated from different languages. Broz was working on screen plays and editing documentary films for a TV series called "The Best Among Us" as powerful lessons in ethics and civics for present and future generations in the West Balkans, Europe and beyond.

She authored two books: Good People in an Evil Time – Portraits of Complicity and Resistance in the Bosnian War, translated by Ellen Elias-Bursać (2003) and Having What it Takes – Essays on Civil Courage, edited by Tom Butler, (2006).

Her work was internationally recognized for its educational innovation and unique approach. She had lectured at over 100 universities in the US and Europe.

== Awards and honours ==
Broz was honoured in 2011 by French President Nicolas Sarkozy with the award of the Ordre National du Merite.

She was an honorary citizen of the city of Tuzla, Bosnia and Herzegovina, her mother's hometown. In 2007, Centro Educativo Italo Svizzero, in Rimini, Italy awarded her the La Bussola dell'Educazione "Margherita Zoebeli"; in 2003 the City Government of Milan, Italy awarded her L'Ambrogino d'Oro and dedicated a tree and stone to her in the World Garden of the Righteous.

== Writings ==
- Good People in an Evil Time, 2002.
- Having What It Takes: Essays on Civil Courage, 2006
