= Jeremiah (TV series) =

2002 action drama television series

- Season 2 intertitle
- Genre: Post-apocalyptic; Action drama
- Created by: J. Michael Straczynski
- Based on: Jeremiah by Hermann Huppen
- Starring: Luke Perry; Malcolm-Jamal Warner; Peter Stebbings; Kim Hawthorne; Byron Lawson; Kandyse McClure; Robert Wisden; Ingrid Kavelaars; Suzy Joachim; Joanne Kelly; Sean Astin; Michael Teigen; John Pyper-Ferguson; Enid-Raye Adams
- Theme music composer: Tim Truman
- Countries of origin: United States; Canada
- No. of seasons: 2
- No. of episodes: 35 (list of episodes)

Production
- Executive producers: J. Michael Straczynski; Luke Perry; Ervin Rustemagić; Scott Mitchell Rosenberg
- Producer: George Horie
- Running time: 45 minutes
- Production companies: Platinum Studios; Jeremiah Productions, Inc.; J. Michael Straczynski Productions; MGM Television; Showtime Networks

Original release
- Network: Showtime
- Release: March 3, 2002 – September 24, 2004

Jeremiah is a post-apocalyptic action drama television series starring Luke Perry and Malcolm-Jamal Warner that ran on the Showtime network from March 3, 2002 to September 24, 2004. Loosely based on the Belgian comic series Jeremiah by Hermann Huppen, the series takes place in a future wherein the adult population has been wiped out by a deadly virus.

The series ended production in 2003, after the management of Showtime decided they were no longer interested in producing science fiction programming. Had the series continued, it would have run under a different showrunner than J. Michael Straczynski, who decided to leave following the completion of the production of the second season due to creative differences between himself and MGM Television.

Episodes for the final half of the second season did not begin airing in the United States until September 3, 2004.

== Plot ==
In an alternate 2021, the eponymous Jeremiah is a loner who has spent 15 years searching the United States for a place called "Valhalla Sector". His father, a viral researcher, named Valhalla Sector as a possible refuge shortly before disappearing into the chaos of "The Big Death", a 2006 plague that killed nearly everyone over the age of thirteen. A stop in the Colorado trading town of Clarefield results in Jeremiah teaming up with another lone traveller named Kurdy, before being imprisoned by the town's warlord with a man named Simon. Simon wants to recruit Jeremiah for a vague and mysterious organization. With Kurdy's help, Jeremiah and Simon escape, but Simon is fatally wounded in the process.

Following the instructions given to them by the dying Simon, Jeremiah and Kurdy take Simon's truck back to "Thunder Mountain", the remains of the Cheyenne Mountain Complex, where they discover a well-organized and well-equipped group led by the former child prodigy Markus Alexander. He chooses to employ Jeremiah and Kurdy as a recon team to replace Simon and his partner, sending the two men back outside to gather information in preparation for the time when the organization will need to start rebuilding the world.

Over the course of the first season, the group encounters threats originating from Valhalla Sector, which they discover to be a sealed and heavily armed bunker complex in Pennsylvania (the ruins of Raven Rock Mountain Complex), used to house the remainder of the US government and military leadership during The Big Death. The survivors there plan to rebuild the world in an authoritarian mold using military might and weaponizing The Big Death virus itself to wipe out non-compliant populations. The second half of Season 1 primarily deals with the efforts of Jeremiah and Thunder Mountain to stop Valhalla Sector.

After the final defeat of Valhalla Sector in the opening episodes of Season 2, a new threat emerges in the form of a crusading army from the East, led by a mysterious prophetic figure known as Daniel. Season 2 deals with the impending conflict between the unifying survivor communities under Thunder Mountain, and the advancing Army of Daniel.

Although a third season was considered, series creator J. Michael Straczynski made it clear that if the show ran a further season he would have nothing to do with it. The show concluded with the end of the second season resolving most plot threads.

== Cast ==
Most of the characters are survivors of the virus who are now in their late twenties or younger.

Character	Actor	Description
Jeremiah	Luke Perry	While roaming the country on a quest to locate a mysterious place called Valhalla Sector, which his father claimed might hold some hope for the survivors of the big death, Jeremiah comes in contact with a group who not only has information on Valhalla Sector, but also the resources to rebuild the world. In Season Two Jeremiah is put in charge of rebuilding the town Millhaven.
Kurdy Malloy	Malcolm-Jamal Warner	Jeremiah's partner, a tough and cynical man, yet also compassionate, he and Jeremiah discover the secrets of Thunder Mountain.
Markus Alexander	Peter Stebbings	The leader of Thunder Mountain, a colony located inside the former NORAD headquarters in Cheyenne Mountain Complex, he seeks to form alliances with other survivors and to forge a new world.
Mister Smith	Sean Astin	This quirky, colorful character partners with Kurdy in Season Two. He claims to be a messenger from God.
Erin	Ingrid Kavelaars	Markus' second-in-command at Thunder Mountain.
Lee Chen	Byron Lawson	The humorless and paranoid head of security at Thunder Mountain, his loyalties may lie elsewhere.
Meaghan Lee Rose	Suzy Joachim	Meaghan is a survivor of "The Big Death" and a carrier of the plague. She lives in a biohazard containment room in Thunder Mountain.
Ezekiel	Alex Zahara	A mysterious figure who gives Jeremiah cryptic prophecies about his future and protects him from danger.
Theodora "Theo" Coleridge	Kim Hawthorne	Theo rules Clarefield, Colorado as a ruthless warlord, until her reign is overthrown, but she will still become a strong voice in the new world.
Elizabeth Munroe	Kandyse McClure	Elizabeth is a resident of Thunder Mountain, and Jeremiah and Kurdy first arrived there to bring news of her boyfriend Simon's death. Kurdy becomes attracted to her after comforting her in her grief over Simon's death.
Devon	Robert Wisden	Jeremiah's father and a resident of Valhalla Sector. Jeremiah thought he died in the Big Death, but he was taken to Valhalla Sector and survived. He is a scientist who understands the Big Death and may hold the key to its cure.
Liberty "Libby" Kaufman	Joanne Kelly	Libby is Devon's assistant in Valhalla Sector and appears to fall in love with Jeremiah. Her loyalty to the Western Alliance is questionable.

== Production ==
=== Development ===
In 1991, Scott Mitchell Rosenberg published black-and-white English translations of the first three volumes of Belgian writer Hermann Huppen's Jeremiah under Malibu Comics’s Adventure Comics imprint. Later, as CEO of Platinum Studios, Rosenberg acquired the media rights to the series and developed a television adaptation.

The show, created by Babylon 5 creator J. Michael Straczynski, was executive-produced by Straczynski and Sam Egan in its first season, and by Straczynski and Grant Rosenberg in its second. Loosely based on Huppen's 1979 comic, the series retained only the names of the two main characters, the protagonist’s general personality, and the post-apocalyptic setting.

Shooting began in Vancouver, British Columbia in the fall of 2001. Actors Luke Perry, from Beverly Hills 90210, and Malcolm-Jamal Warner, from The Cosby Show, were cast in the leads. Featuring Jeremiah and Kurdy traveling the country in a military CUCV, Straczynski described Jeremiah as a “road show."

=== Filming ===
The series was filmed in Vancouver, British Columbia, Canada.

=== Locations ===
Name	Locations	Group
Thunder Mountain	Cheyenne Mountain Complex in Colorado	New America Alliance (Western Alliance)
Valhalla Sector	Virginia or West Virginia	United States of America, remnants of the Joint Chiefs of Staff and Executive Branch
Milhaven	Colorado	Valhalla Sector, later Western Alliance
Clarefield	Colorado	New America Alliance (Western Alliance)

=== Cancellation ===
Straczynski had prepared a five-year series, but a change in personnel in Showtime's administration caused the network to decide to stop producing science fiction programming and unofficially cancel Jeremiah before the second season had its debut in November 2003. Fans realized the possibility of cancellation when Showtime announced the airing of only the first seven out of fifteen episodes of the second season, and organized a campaign to write and phone executives at Showtime, MGM and Platinum Studios to convince them to show the remaining eight and continue with a third season. Ultimately, the network began airing the remaining of the second season starting on September 3, 2004 - after a ten-month break since the last aired episode - but despite continuously rising ratings did not proceed with the renewal of the show.

Before season 2 premiered, Straczynski vowed to never work with the then-current administration of MGM Television after experiencing major creative differences with them, and had there been a third season it would have to run under some new showrunner. Everyone on cast and crew, including Grant Rosenberg, the second season's co-executive producer, were willing to have continued.

== Home media ==
In January 2004, MGM Home Entertainment released season 1 of Jeremiah on DVD. Season 2 was released on DVD as a "burn on demand" from Amazon (available to US and Canadian addresses only) in March 2010. The series episodes are also available as digital purchases on Amazon Video, Hulu and iTunes (season 2 only).

== In other media ==
=== RPGs ===
After having been designed by Morrigan Press, Mongoose Publishing published Jeremiah: The Roleplaying Game in 2005.
