= Alma Lazarevska =

Bosnian writer

Alma Lazarevska is a Bosnian writer. A native Sarajevan, she studied philosophy at Sarajevo University. Her books have been translated into English, French and German.

== Works ==
- Sarajevo Solitaire, essays, Sarajevo, 1994.
- The Sign of Rose, novel, Sarajevo, 1996.
- Death at the Museum of Modern Art, short stories, Sarajevo, 1996.
- Plants are something else, short stories, Sarajevo, 2002.
