= Hermann Huppen =

Belgian comic book creator (1938–2026)

Hermann
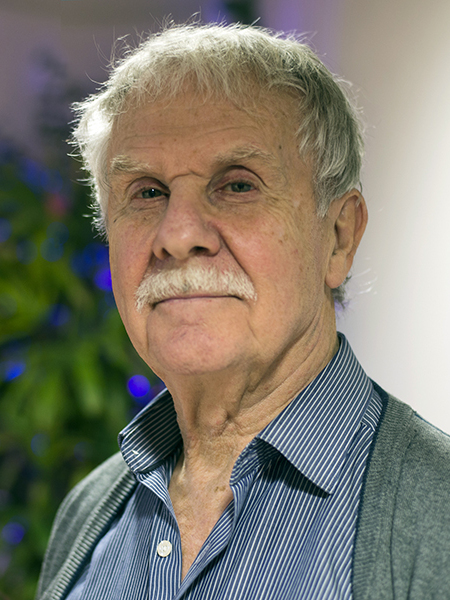
- Hermann in 2017
- Born: 17 July 1938 Malmedy, Belgium
- Died: 22 March 2026 (aged 87)
- Areas: Artist, writer
- Notable works: Jeremiah; Les Tours de Bois-Maury; Bernard Prince
- Awards: full list

Hermann Huppen (17 July 1938 – 22 March 2026), better known by the pen-name Hermann, was a Belgian comic book creator. He was most famous for his post-apocalyptic comic Jeremiah which was made into a television series.

== Life and career ==
Hermann was born on 17 July 1938 in Bévercé (now a part of Malmedy) in Liège Province. After studying to become a furniture maker and working as interior architect, Hermann made his debut as comic book artist in 1964 in the Franco-Belgian comics magazine Spirou with a four-page story. Greg noticed his talent and offered him to work for his studio. In 1966, he began illustrating the Bernard Prince series written by Greg, published in Tintin magazine. In 1969, also in collaboration with Greg, he began the western series Comanche. This appeared at the same time as other western series such as Blueberry.

He began writing his own stories in 1977, starting the post-apocalyptic Jeremiah series, which is still produced today. In the same period, he also made three albums of Nick, inspired by Little Nemo in Slumberland, for Spirou. In 1983, he began a new series, Les Tours de Bois-Maury, which is set in the Middle Ages and is less focused on action than his other works.

Hermann also created many non-series graphic novels sometimes together with his son Yves H. One of them, Lune de Guerre, with a story by Jean Van Hamme, was later filmed as The Wedding Party by Dominique Deruddere.

Hermann died on 22 March 2026, at the age of 87.

=== Style and artistic philosophy ===
Throughout his career, Hermann remained fiercely dedicated to traditional comic book craftsmanship, creating his works using physical mediums such as pencils, ink, and direct coloring. He expressed strong skepticism toward the digitalization of the comic book industry and the widespread use of computer graphics, arguing that digital art often strips illustrations of their unique character, human imperfection, and the organic "dirt" that defined his signature style.

In both his historical series (such as The Towers of Bois-Maury) and post-apocalyptic narratives (like Jeremiah), Hermann rejected the idealization of protagonists and contemporary political correctness. Instead, his storytelling focused on a gritty, uncompromising realism, frequently exploring the dark, primal, and brutal aspects of human nature under extreme duress or in survival scenarios.

== Awards ==
- 1973: Prix Saint-Michel, Belgium
- 1980: Prix Saint-Michel
- 1992: Best Long Comic Strip at the Haxtur Awards, Spain

- nominated for Best Drawing at the Haxtur Awards

- 1998: U Giancu's Prize, International Cartoonists Exhibition
- 1999: nominated for Best Drawing and Best Cover at the Haxtur Awards
- 2001: Best Drawing at the Haxtur Awards

- nominated for Best Short Comic Strip and Best Script at the Haxtur Awards

- 2002: Grand Prix Saint-Michel

- nominated for Best Short Comic Strip and Best Drawing at the Haxtur Awards

- 2003: nominated for the Audience Award and the Artwork Award at the Angoulême International Comics Festival, France
- 2005: nominated for the Audience Award at the Angoulême International Comics Festival
- 2006: nominated for Best Comic (French language) at the Prix Saint-Michel
- 2010: nominated for Best Artwork at the Prix Saint-Michel

== Selected bibliography ==
All of these comics have been published in French, Dutch and German: other translations are noted in the "remarks" column.

Series	Years	Volumes	Written by	Editor	Remarks
Bernard Prince	1969–1980, 2010	14	Greg and Yves H. (Vol. 18)	Le Lombard and Dargaud	Translated into German; Translated into Danish; Translated into Serbian; Translated into Swedish; Translated into Tamil by Lion Comics; Translated into Polish. Volumes 1-13 (Greg/Hermann), volumes 14-15 (Greg/Danny), volumes 16-17 (Greg/Aidan), volume 18 (Hermann/Yves H.)
Comanche	1972–1983	10	Greg	Le Lombard and Dargaud	Continued by Rouge for five more stories; Translated into Serbian; Translated into Tamil by Lion Comics; Translated into Polish
Jugurtha	1975–1977	2	Vernal	RTP, Le Lombard and Dargaud	
Jeremiah	1979–?	39	Hermann	Fleurus, Edi-3, Novedi, Hachette, and Dupuis	Translated into Serbian; translated into Polish; volumes 1 & 4 translated into English and published by Fantagraphics in 1983 under the titles The Survivors: Talons of Blood and The Survivors: The Eyes That Burned; Jeremiah 13: Strike published by Catalan Communications in 1990. Jeremiah: Gun in the Water and Jeremiah: Mercenaries published by Strip Art Features (SAF) in 2002 and 2003. A new series began in March 2012, collecting 3 of the original French language tomes in each hardcover edition; the series is being simultaneously published in English (as The Jeremiah Omnibus by SAF and Dark Horse Comics), German (as Jeremiah Integrale by Kult Editionen), Italian (as Jeremiah. Ediz. integrale by Linea Chiara), and Spanish (as Jeremiah Integral by Planeta DeAgostini Cómics).
Alerte aux pirates	1980	1	Yves Duval and Step	Bédéscope	
Les Dalton	1980	1	Yves Duval	Bédéscope	
Hey, Nick! Are you dreaming	1981–1983	3	Morphée	Dupuis	Translated into English by SAF Comics 2003
Les Tours de Bois-Maury (The Towers of Bois-Maury)	1984–2021	16	Hermann (vols 12-15 written by Yves H.)	Glénat	Translated into Danish, Serbocroatian and Polish, published in English by Titan Books Volumes 1 published in English by Titan Books 1984; Volumes 1 & 2 published in English by Titan Books 1989; Volumes 1-3 translated into English by Catalan Communications 1990 and Volumes 1 and 2 republished by SAF Comics in 2002. Volumes 11-15 are named Bois-Maury, as opposed to the original naming of the first 10 volumes.
Abominations	1988	1	Hermann	Glénat	Published in English in 1990 by Catalan Communications
Missié Vandisandi	1991	1	Hermann	Dupuis	
Sarajevo Tango	1995	1	Hermann	Dupuis	The first book Hermann made in direct color.
Le secret des hommes-chiens	1995	1	Yves Huppen	Dupuis	First collaboration with his son Yves
Caatinga	1997	1	Hermann	Le Lombard	
Wild bill is Dead	1999	1	Hermann	Dupuis	Translated into English by SAF Comics 2003
Liens de sang	2000	1	Yves H.	Le Lombard	Published in English by Dark Horse Comics
Lune de guerre	2000	1	Jean Van Hamme	Dupuis	Translated into Polish.
Manhattan Beach 1957	2002	1	Yves H.	Le Lombard	Translated into English by SAF Comics 2003
Zhong Guo	2003	1	Yves H.	Dupuis	
The girl from Ipanema	2005	1	Yves H.	Le Lombard	Translated to Danish
Sur les traces de Dracula : Vlad l'empaleur	2006	1	Yves H.	Casterman	Translated to Danish; Translated into Serbian
La vie exagérée de l'Homme Nylon	2007	1	Hans-Michael Kirstein	Le Lombard	
Afrika	2007	1	Hermann	Le Lombard	Danish translation by Faraos Cigarer Translated into English by SAF Comics and published in USA by Dark Horse 2012
Le diable des sept mers	2008–2009	2	Yves H.	Dupuis	
Une nuit de pleine lune	2011	1	Yves H.	Glénat	
Retour au Congo	2013	1	Yves H.	Glénat	
Station 16	2014	1	Yves H.	Le Lombard	Translated into Polish.
Sans pardon	2015	1	Yves H.	Le Lombard	Translated into Polish.
Old Pa Anderson	2016	1	Yves H.	Le Lombard	
Le Passeur	2016	1	Yves H.	Dupuis	.
Duke	2017-	7	Yves H.	Le Lombard	

== Sources ==
- Béra, Michel; Denni, Michel; and Mellot, Philippe (2002): "Trésors de la Bande Dessinée 2003-2004". Paris, Les éditions de l'amateur. ISBN 2-85917-357-9
- Hermann publications in Spirou, Belgian Tintin, French Tintin, Circus / Vécu Archived 26 October 2007 at the Wayback Machine, BoDoï BDoubliées (in French)
- Frosztęga, Radosław (2024). "Wywiad z Hermann Huppen" (Interview with Hermann Huppen). POPKulturowy Kociołek. (in Polish)
