= Jeremiah (comics) =

Belgian comic book series by Hermann Huppen

- Jeremiah: La nuit des rapaces (April 1979)
- Created by: Hermann Huppen

Publication information
- Publisher: Le Lombard; Dupuis
Title(s)
- La Nuit des rapaces
- Du sable plein les dents
- Les Héritiers sauvages
- Les Yeux de fer rouge
- Un cobaye pour l'éternité
- La Secte
- Afromerica
- Les Eaux de la colère
- Un hiver de clown
- Boomerang
- Delta
- Julius et Romea
- Strike
- Simon est de retour
- Alex
- La Ligne rouge
- Trois motos... ou quatre
- Ave Caesar
- Zone frontière
- Mercenaires
- Le Cousin Lindford
- Le Fusil dans l'eau
- Qui est renard bleu?
- Le Dernier Diamant
- Et si un jour, la Terre...
- Un port dans l'ombre
- Elsie et la rue
- Esra va très bien
- Le petit chat est mort
- Fifty-Fifty
- Le panier de crabes
- Le Caïd
- Un gros chien avec une blonde
- Formats: Original material for the series has been published as a strip in the comics anthology(s): Strip Art; Zack; Métal hurlant; Spirou; Politikin Zabavnik; and a set of graphic novels.
- Original language: French
- Genre: Action/adventure
- Publication date: 1979 – present
- Main character(s): Jeremiah; Kurdy

Creative team
- Writer(s): Hermann Huppen
- Artist(s): Hermann Huppen

Jeremiah (also known as "The Survivors" in some English translations) is a Belgian science fiction comic book series by Hermann Huppen. Jeremiah was created in 1979 for the German magazine Zack, and had a premiere in Sarajevo based Strip art magazine, since the editor of this magazine, Ervin Rustemagic, was also Hermann's manager. It has also been serialized in the French-language Métal Hurlant and Spirou magazine, as well as the Serbian magazines Stripoteka and Politikin Zabavnik. Currently, there are 40 volumes and one "Special Edition" in French and Dutch.

== Plot ==
Racial wars have torn the U.S. apart, resulting in a post-apocalyptic world. Many small pockets of civilization still exist; from isolated super high-tech fortresses, hidden research labs, or racial groups in walled-in cities — all fighting each other among the more regular population which in many ways resembles the "old west".

Jeremiah and his friend Kurdy travel the country, taking odd jobs and getting mixed up in various affairs. Jeremiah, being the more noble of the two, often sticks his neck out to help others, while Kurdy is a more wily, opportunistic scoundrel.

Despite its setting, Jeremiah's underlying motif is of hope and the survival of mankind. The storylines carry little from album to album, meaning they can be read individually.

== Reception ==
Jeremiah has been translated into 26 languages, and has a large fan base in Europe. Tome #25, Et si un jour la Terre, was nominated for the 2005 Angoulême International Comics Festival Prize Awarded by the Audience.

Various attempts to introduce the series to the American market have had middling results, mostly due to the different tastes of the American and European comic book public. The current holder of the English language copyrights is Strip Art Features (SAF). After failing to reach American audiences in the 1980s and 1990s with such publishers as Fantagraphics, Catalan Communications, and Malibu Comics; Jeremiah (and SAF) found success with Dark Horse beginning in the 2000s. In March 2012, Dark Horse Comics began another English language reprint series in collaboration with SAF; three volumes of the Jeremiah Omnibus, collecting tomes 1 to 3, 4 to 6, and 7 to 9 respectively, have been released as of October 2017. In May 2019, SAF released digital editions of volumes 1 to 6, and later of volumes 7 to 9 in July 2020.

== List of titles ==
Following are the Jeremiah comic albums as named in French, with publication dates.

Tome Number	Title	Publication date
1	La Nuit des rapaces	April 1979
2	Du sable plein les dents	Oct. 1979
3	Les Héritiers sauvages	Jan. 1980
4	Les Yeux de fer rouge	July 1980
5	Un cobaye pour l'éternité	May 1981
6	La Secte	Feb. 1982
7	Afromerica	Sept. 1982
8	Les Eaux de la colère	April 1983
9	Un hiver de clown	Nov. 1983
10	Boomerang	Oct. 1984
11	Delta	Oct. 1985
12	Julius et Romea	Oct. 1986
13	Strike	May 1988
14	Simon est de retour	Sept. 1989
15	Alex	Sept. 12, 1990
16	La Ligne rouge	Oct. 7, 1992
17	Trois motos... ou quatre	Feb. 2, 1994
18	Ave Caesar	May 31, 1995
19	Zone frontière	April 10, 1996
20	Mercenaires	Sept. 3, 1997
21	Le Cousin Lindford	Oct. 1998
22	Le Fusil dans l'eau	Mar. 7, 2001
23	Qui est renard bleu?	Mar. 6, 2002
24	Le Dernier Diamant	Apr. 2, 2003
25	Et si un jour, la Terre	Apr. 2004
26	Un port dans l'ombre?	Oct. 2005
27	Elsie et la rue	Jan. 2007
28	Esra va très bien	Jan. 2008
29	Le petit chat est mort	Jan. 2010
30	Fifty-Fifty	Feb. 2011
31	Le panier de crabes	Jan. 2012
32	Le Caïd	Feb. 2013
33	Un gros chien avec une blonde	Sept. 2014
34	Jungle City	Oct. 2015
35	Kurdy Malloy et Mama Olga	Sept. 2017
36	Et Puis Merde	Oct. 2018
37	La Bête	Sept. 2019
38	Tu piges?	Sept. 2020
39	Rancune	Sept. 2022
40	Celui qui manque	Oct. 2023

=== English language Jeremiah comics ===
English title	Publisher	Publication date	Translated book	Note
The Survivors Vol. 1: Talons of Blood	Fantagraphics	Aug. 1982	Jeremiah 1: La Nuit des rapaces	
The Survivors Vol. 2: The Eyes That Burned	Fantagraphics	Sept. 1983	Jeremiah 4: Les Yeux de fer rouge	
Jeremiah 13: Strike	Catalan Communications	June 1990	Jeremiah 13: Strike	ISBN 0-87416-106-1
Jeremiah: Birds of Prey #1–2	Adventure Comics	Jan. 1991	Jeremiah 1: La Nuit des rapaces	
Jeremiah: A Fistful of Sand #1–2	Adventure Comics	June 1991	Jeremiah 2: Du sable plein les dents	
Jeremiah: The Heirs #1–2	Adventure Comics	Sept. 1991	Jeremiah 3: Les Héritiers Sauvages	
Jeremiah: Gun in the Water	Strip Art Features/Dark Horse Comics	Nov. 2002	Jeremiah 22: Le Fusil dans l'Eau	ISBN 978-1-56971-827-8
Jeremiah: Mercenaries	Strip Art Features/Dark Horse Comics	Dec. 2003	Jeremiah 20: Mercenaires	ISBN 978-1-59396-001-8
Jeremiah Omnibus Vol. 1	Strip Art Features/Dark Horse Comics	Mar. 2012	Jeremiah tomes 1–3	ISBN 978-1-59582-945-0
Jeremiah Omnibus Vol. 2	Strip Art Features/Dark Horse Comics	Nov. 2012	Jeremiah tomes 4–6	ISBN 978-1-61655-085-1
Jeremiah Omnibus Vol. 3	Strip Art Features/Dark Horse Comics	Oct. 2013	Jeremiah tomes 7–9	ISBN 978-1-61655-299-2
Jeremiah Book #1: Birds of Prey	Strip Art Features	May 2019	Jeremiah 1: La Nuit des rapaces	ISBN 978-9-61945-197-7
Jeremiah Book #2: A Fistful of Sand	Strip Art Features	May 2019	Jeremiah 2: Du sable plein les dents	ISBN 978-9-61945-198-4
Jeremiah Book #3: The Heirs	Strip Art Features	May 2019	Jeremiah 3: Les Héritiers sauvages	ISBN 978-9-61945-199-1
Jeremiah Book #4: The Eyes that Burned	Strip Art Features	May 2019	'Jeremiah 4: Les Yeux de fer rouge	ISBN 978-9-61947-140-1
Jeremiah Book #5: A Guinea Pig for Eternity	Strip Art Features	May 2019	Jeremiah 5: Un cobaye pour l'éternité	ISBN 978-9-61947-141-8
Jeremiah Book #6: The Cult	Strip Art Features	May 2019	Jeremiah 6: La Secte	ISBN 978-9-61947-142-5
Jeremiah Book #7: Afromerica	Strip Art Features	July 2020	Jeremiah 7: Afromerica	ISBN 978-9-61708-119-0
Jeremiah Book #8: Waters of Wrath	Strip Art Features	July 2020	Jeremiah 8: Les Eaux de la colère	ISBN 978-9-61708-120-6
Jeremiah Book #9: Winter of the Clowns	Strip Art Features	July 2020	Jeremiah 9: Un hiver de clown	ISBN 978-9-61708-121-3

== Television series ==
An American television series, Jeremiah, was produced from 2002–2004. Developed by Babylon 5 creator J. Michael Straczynski and executive produced by Straczynski and Sam Egan, the series is loosely based on the Jeremiah comics series. Aside from the names of the two main characters, the general personality of the protagonist, and the post-apocalyptic setting, there are no similarities between the comics and the series.

== See also ==
- Hombre (comics)
