= Another Story Festival =

AnOther Story Festival
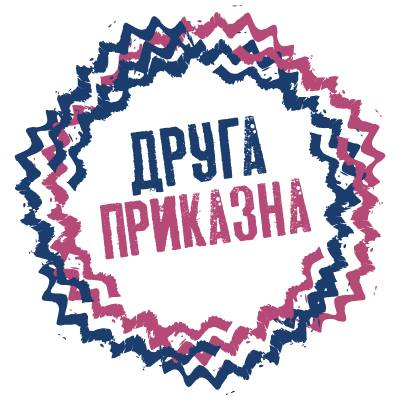
- AnOther Story Festival logo
- Location: Skopje, North Macedonia
- Founded: 2016
- Awards: Прва награда (Prva nagrada)
- Festival date: 28, 29, 30 June
- Language: Macedonian, English

The Another Story festival (Macedonian: Друга приказна, tr. Druga Prikazna), is an annual three-day literary event, taking place in Skopje, Republic of North Macedonia. The name of the festival refers to the idea of affirming the local and global faces of otherness in culture and literature. At its inauguration in 2016, the festival's topic was ‘Literature and Activism’, and was inspired by the “Colorful Revolution” protests in the county.

== Origin and history ==
The inauguration of the festival corresponded with the mass protests, organized by the civil sector in Macedonia, against alleged corruption within the country's political elite. The idea behind the festival is to "harvest" the creative energy from the street protests and transform them into artistic expressions of the desire for democratization and emancipation. Another objective of the festival is to popularize literature and culture, both of which, according to the organizers, have been quite marginally maintained in the country due to a widespread poverty and poor cultural demand.

== Themes ==
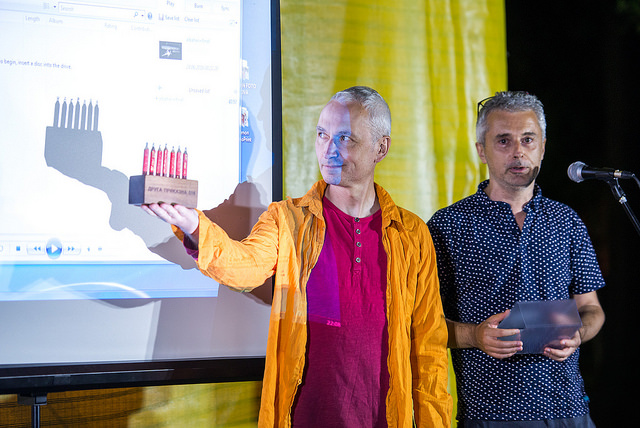
Dragan Protić and Nikola Gelevski at the festival

The phrase ‘Another Story’, selected as a name of the festival, aims at affirming the otherness in culture and literature, as well as of the many faces of local and global otherness. The main message of the Another Story Festival is tolerance and the desire to create another, different kind of Macedonia - one more open and accepting towards to diversity.

The main subject of Another Story is short fiction, however, the festival also covers hybrid literature forms, as literary forms that combine written word with music, graphics, media, theory, etc.

== Guests ==
Every year the festival gives out a grand prize. In 2016 the winner was David Albahari, a renowned Serbian Jewish writer from Belgrade.
