= WOWIO =

Former digital media company

- Company type: Public
- Industry: Books, Comics
- Founded: August 2006
- Founder: William Lidwell
- Defunct: 2018
- Headquarters: Los Angeles, California, U.S.
- Key people: Brian Altounian
- Products: E-books
- Services: Publishing, Merchandising, Restaurants, Hospitality, Homebuilding
- Owner: (2009–2015): Brian Altounian / Alliance Acquisitions, LLC
- Parent: (from May 2014): Studio W
- Divisions: WEvolt; Drunk Duck @Brand; Pop Galaxy
- Website: www.wowio.com

WOWIO, Inc. was a Los Angeles–based digital media company founded in 2006 that offered ad-supported Ebooks and later expanded into webcomics communities and electronic publishing platforms (including WEvolt, Drunk Duck, and Pop Galaxy). After a series of acquisitions and ownership changes, the company shifted its focus in 2017 toward investments in real estate, hospitality, and entertainment ventures. As of 2018, WOWIO had deregistered its common stock and become largely inactive.

== History ==
=== Founding and early model ===
WOWIO was founded in 2006 in Los Angeles by author and entrepreneur William Lidwell. Its original goal was to provide readers with free, downloadable Ebooks in exchange for embedded advertisements. Initial offerings in the WOWIO catalogue included public domain titles like Wuthering Heights and Frankenstein, and comic book titles such as the Tenth Muse series.

In April 2008, the company announced a partnership with Fangoria Comics / The Scream Factory to host a selection of the two companies' horror titles on WOWIO for free (for a limited time).

=== Platinum Studios, Brian Altounian ===
In June 2008, Platinum Studios, a media company that developed, published, and licensed comic book properties for adaptation into film, television, and other media, announced that it had begun talks to acquire WOWIO, hoping to make it a "major cornerstone" of "a global digital publishing distribution initiative." The two companies projected that the acquisition would be concluded early in the third quarter of 2008, but issues related to WOWIO's non-payment of quarterly earnings delayed the sale. (Note: Third quarter earnings for 2008 — calculated on a new formula more favorable to WOWIO — were eventually paid.)

In June 2009, WOWIO was purchased outright from Platinum Studios by Brian Altounian, a former Time Warner executive, former COO of Platinum Studios — and still a member of its board. (Note: Altounian served as a Platinum Studios board member from 2005 to 2011.) Altounian's Alliance Acquisitions, LLC, became a minority owner of WOWIO, along with a group of investors; Platinum Studios no longer had any ownership stake.

=== Expansion ===
In June 2010, WOWIO raised $1.7 million and purchased the online community WEvolt. WEvolt, created by comic artist Jason Badower and Matt Jacobs, enabled artists to create, share, and monetize their work through ad sales and merchandising opportunities. Users could distribute their original content or use the site as an aggregator of online media.

In June 2010, a week after its purchase of WEvolt, WOWIO acquired the webcomics community Drunk Duck from Platinum Studios. Originally launched in 2002, Drunk Duck had been acquired by Platinum Studios in 2006 as part of its digital-first publishing strategy. By the time of the WOWIO acquisition, the site hosted only a small number of Platinum titles but had grown to approximately 95,000 subscribed users.

By 2013, WOWIO distributed content across five proprietary websites, including:

- WOWIO.com
- DrunkDuck.com
- WEvolt.com
- PopGalaxy.com (distributed on YouTube)

In May 2014, WOWIO's parent company rebranded itself as "Studio W," focused on digital publishing and media distribution, and launched a new corporate website, StudioWDigital.com. Simultaneously, the company launched a new mobile eBook app featuring over 350,000 titles from Ingram Books, available on Android and later other platforms, as part of its expansion into mobile digital publishing and ad-supported eBooks.

=== Decline and dormancy ===
Beginning in 2013, most of WOWIO's online platforms became inactive. For instance, in mid-August 2013, the Drunk Duck site went offline; after delays and intermittent restoration, it was relaunched on October 10, 2013, as TheDuckWebcomics.com.

Similarly, the PopGalaxy YouTube channel ceased posting new content in 2014 (as of 2025 it has 140 subscribers).

In 2015, management of The Duck Webcomics transitioned from WOWIO to members of its own user community, and the platform has continued to operate independently. As of the 2020s, The Duck Webcomics remains active, hosting thousands of titles and maintaining user-driven forums and publishing tools.

=== Ceast and desist; Altounian's ouster ===
In January 2015, the State of California issued a desist and refrain order against Altounian and Alliance Acquisitions, citing that between 2008 and 2011 they had offered or sold securities through untrue or misleading statements. Altounian was removed as WOWIO CEO in September 2015. During his last months as CEO, WOWIO went public with an initial share price over $1; within months, the share price fell below $0.01. Robert H. Estareja, President of WOWIO since February 2015, replaced Altounian as CEO in September 2015.

=== Shift to real estate; deregistration ===
In 2017, Estareja was replaced as CEO by Tony Anish, who announced the new strategic direction for the company. New management acknowledged that "the Company has been dormant due to a lack of funding and the inability to take the products they have been working on to market," and changed its strategic direction. The company announced plans to operate as a holding company supporting investments in entertainment, restaurants, tourism, and real estate, including housing projects in Northern California and Arizona. Announced ventures included Castlerock Bar and Grill, Canyon Café, and Wishing Well restaurant in Arizona; Lodgenuity, a hospitality consulting and management company; and land in Avenal, California, for low-income housing.

The company deregistered its common stock in July 2018; the Lodgenuity purchase was canceled in 2019.

== Comics titles hosted on WOWIO (selected) ==
- BUMP (Fangoria Comics/The Scream Factory)
- Clive Barker's Hellraiser: Collected Best, Volume 1
- Darkchylde
- Day by Day (Chris Muir)
- Dead with Dick & Jane (KS Comics)
- Dee Snider's Strangeland: Seven Sins (Fangoria Comics/The Scream Factory)
- Elsinore (Devil's Due Digital)
- G.R.A.V.E. Grrrls: Destroyers of the Dead (The Scream Factory)
- Hero Happy Hour (GeekPunk)
- Last Blood (Blatant Comics)
- Lullaby (Alias Comics)
- No Need for Bushido
- Robert Kurtzman's Beneath The Valley of The Rage (Fangoria Comics/The Scream Factory)
- The X-Files (Devil's Due Digital)
