= Troy Brownfield =

American writer (born 1973)

- Born: September 1, 1973 (age 53) Terre Haute, Indiana, U.S.
- Area: Writer
- Notable works: Sparkshooter, Blood Queen, Prince Dracula, Inhabited, Marvel Comics for Dummies

Troy Brownfield is a comic book writer, journalist, and college professor from Indiana. He became widely known to the online community as a columnist for Newsarama and the creator/editor of ShotgunReviews.com. In June of 2018, he joined The Saturday Evening Post as a Staff Writer. With the September/October 2022 issues of the Post, Jack & Jill, and Humpty Dumpty, he has been named Executive Editor.

== Journalism background ==
Brownfield attended Indiana State University, where he earned a master's degree in English focusing on creative writing. While an undergraduate student, Brownfield wrote a number of items for ISU's Indiana Statesman. This background led to Brownfield's invitation to join the now-defunct ComicKingdom.com. In 1999, Brownfield created ShotgunReviews.com, a site intended to give young writers a place to sharpen their work.

Brownfield's articles have appeared in publications such as Wired, The Indianapolis Star, Indianapolis Monthly, INTake Weekly, Street Miami Magazine, Savant online, and Comicon.com's The Pulse.

Brownfield contributed regularly to Newsarama. He formerly edited and co-wrote the Best Shots review feature, as well as the columns "Your Manga Minute" and "Super-Articulate". He remained a frequent columnist through 2011. In 2004, Brownfield accepted an appointment to the position of Assistant Professor in the Department of English, Journalism, and Languages at Saint Mary-of-the-Woods College, where he taught journalism, English, communications and film. He left the college at the close of the 2010–2011 school year. He taught in central Indiana until 2018, when he joined the writing staff of the Indianapolis-based Saturday Evening Post. Brownfield was named Senior Editor of the Post and the Post Society's U.S. Kids Magazines (Jack & Jill and Humpty Dumpty) in 2021; he became Executive Editor in 2022.

On August 20, 2024, Brownfield was announced as the writer for Marvel Comics for Dummies, part of a six-volume set of books for the Dummies brand. The book was released in February 2025. Brownfield was later also confirmed as the writer of X-Men for Dummies.

== Comics and more ==
In July 2006, Brownfield was announced as one of the first writers with the freshly-minted Fangoria Comics, an offshoot imprint of the horror magazine. He was announced as an associate editor for the line. He stayed with the line when they departed to become The Scream Factory, and again through their relationship with Fangoria Graphix. As of 2010, The Scream Factory again operates on its own, with Brownfield still associate editor. It was announced in February 2010 that Brownfield would be writing "Tales from Wonderland: The White Knight" for Zenescope. In November 2010, Brownfield and former Newsarama editor Matt Brady were announced as the writers of Dynamite's Buck Rogers Annual #1, due in February 2011. Brownfield and Brady co-wrote a story for the Batman 80 Page Giant 2011, released in August. In November, Brownfield announced that he and artist Sarah Vaughn would launch a webcomic, Sparkshooter, in February 2012; Enkaru (Encar Robles) drew #3-13, Kate Frizzell drew #14-15, and Malik O. Smith drew #16. Brownfield was announced as the new regular writer for "Grimm Fairy Tales Myths & Legends" by Zenescope Entertainment Executive Editor Raven Gregory in early summer 2012; Brownfield's first issue, #18, appeared in July. In February 2014, Brownfield was announced as the writer for a new ongoing series from Dynamite Entertainment, The Blood Queen, beginning in June. In May 2014, Dynamite Entertainment published an eBook by Brownfield, a novel titled[Prince Dracula; the paperback version became available in July 2014. He was the editor-in-chief of Imminent Press. Brownfield published a horror short story collection, INHABITED, in 2019. Since 2017, Brownfield has written comics with Brazilian publishers and studios associated with frequent collaborator Paulo Teles Yonami, including House 137 and AllGeek. As Yonami's studios work closely with American publisher TidalWave, Brownfield has also been writing material in collaboration with that publisher and Yonami since 2022.

== Comics ==
=== Blue Moon Comics ===
| Title | Date | Notes |
|---|---|---|
| Control Zero serial in Infinite Tales web & print comic | 2000 | Writer (art by Bryan Heyboer) |

=== Shotgun Press (at ShotgunReviews.com) ===
| Title | Date | Notes |
|---|---|---|
| Genre aka Genretown webcomic (2 issues) | 2000 | Writer (art by Jon Hueber with Terence Muncy) |
| Manifest Darkness webcomic (2 installments) | 2000 | Writer (art by Tim Laitas and Matt Ross) |

=== Fangoria Comics ===
| Title | Date | Notes |
|---|---|---|
| Bump #1-4 | 2007 | Associate Editor, mini-series |
| Robert Kurtzman's Beneath The Valley of The Rage #1-4 | 2007 | Associate Editor, mini-series |
| Dee Snider's Strangeland: Seven Sins #1-4 | 2007 | Associate Editor, mini-series |
| The Fourth Horseman #1-2 | 2007 | Associate Editor, mini-series; series not completed |
| Death Walks the Streets #0-3 | 2008-2010 | Associate Editor, mini-series |

=== Zenescope Entertainment ===
| Title | Date | Notes |
|---|---|---|
| Tales from Wonderland: The White Knight #1 | 2010 | Writer, one-shot |
| Grimm Fairy Tales Myths and Legends #18-25 | 2012-2013 | Writer, co-plotter with Raven Gregory, Ralph Tedesco & Joe Brusha |
| Grimm Fairy Tales (comics) #83-84 | 2013 | Writer |
| Unleashed - Zombies: The Cursed (comics) #1-3 | 2013 | Writer |
| Grimm Fairy Tales (comics) #89-91 | 2013 | Writer |
| GFT presents Wonderland: Clash of Queens (comics) #3-5 | 2014 | Writer |
| GFT vs. Wonderland (comics) #1-4 | 2014 | Writer |
| White Queen: Age of Darkness (comics) #1-3 | 2015 | Writer |
| Jurassic Strike Force 5 Vol. 2 (comics) #1-5 | Unreleased | Writer |
| Grimm Fairy Tales Halloween Special 2015(comics) | 2015 | Writer |
| Grimm Tales of Terror Vol. 2 #9 and #12 (comics) | 2016 | Writer |
| Grimm Fairy Tales Halloween Special 2016 (comics) | 2016 | Co-Writer |
| Grimm Fairy Tales Annual 2016 (comics) | 2016 | Writer |
| Grimm Tales of Terror Vol. 3 #2 (comics) | 2017 | Writer |
| Spirit Hunters#8 (comics) | 2017 | Writer |

=== Dynamite Entertainment ===
| Title | Date | Notes |
|---|---|---|
| Buck Rogers Annual #1 | 2011 | Co-writer (with Matt Brady), one-shot |
| The Blood Queen #1-6 | 2014 | Writer, ongoing |
| The Blood Queen Annual #1 | 2014 | Writer |
| Blood Queen vs. Dracula #1-4 | 2015 | Writer, mini-series |
| Blood Queen Omnibus | 2017 | Writer; collects all the prior Blood Queen material |

=== DC Comics ===
| Title | Date | Notes |
|---|---|---|
| Batman 80 Page Giant #1 | 2011 | Co-writer of one story (with Matt Brady) |

=== Sparkshooter ===
| Title | Date | Notes |
|---|---|---|
| Sparkshooter webcomic | 2012-present | Writer (#1-2 art by Sarah Vaughn and Ben Olson; #3-13 art by Enkaru; #14-15 art by Kate Frizzell; #16 art by Malik O. Smith) |
| Solo Acoustic webcomic | 2013-present | Writer (art by Ben Olson) |

=== House 137 ===
| Title | Date | Notes |
|---|---|---|
| Zombie[SIDE] anthology | 2017 | Writer, "It Takes a Village" (art by Yonami) |
| Midnight Witch: Neverending Nights anthology | 2017 | Writer, "Epilogue" (art by Kewber Baal) |
| Full House (House 137 Anthology) | 2019 | Contributing writer |

=== Imminent Press ===
| Title | Date | Notes |
|---|---|---|
| Terminal anthology series #1 | 2018 | Editor-in-chief |
| Terminal anthology series #2 | 2018 | Editor-in-chief |
| Terminal anthology series #3 | 2019 | Editor-in-chief |
| Terminal anthology series #4 | 2019 | Editor-in-chief |

=== TidalWave Comics ===
| Title | Date | Notes |
|---|---|---|
| TidalWave Comics Presents 10th Muse and Midnight Witch #1 | 2022 | Writer |
| Midnight Witch #2, #8 | 2023-2024 | Writer |
| Legend of Isis: The New Kingdom #1-4 | 2023 | Writer |

== Novels, collections, and non-fiction ==
- Prince Dracula (2014, Dynamite Entertainment; co-credit given to Bram Stoker)
- Inhabited (2019)
- Marvel Comics for Dummies (2025, Wiley Publishing)
- X-Men for Dummies (2025, Wiley Publishing)
