= List of comics based on unproduced film projects =

This is a list of comics based on unproduced film projects, listed chronologically by the comic's publication date.

- The comic series Daredevil: Man Without Fear by Frank Miller, published in 1993, was originally a film treatment for a planned Daredevil film.
- Freddy vs. Jason vs. Ash is a comic adaptation of a film treatment published starting in November 2007.
- Death Walks the Streets, published by The Scream Factory since June 2008.
- Doorways was a television series developed by George R. R. Martin which filmed a pilot episode but was never aired, and never developed into a full series. The concept was adapted into a comic series in 4 issues beginning in November 2010.
- Filmmaker Kevin Smith wrote a script for a Green Hornet film which was never produced, but adapted into a comic series in 2010.
- The Bionic Man is a comic written by Kevin Smith based on a screenplay by Smith for a feature film reboot of The Six Million Dollar Man. The Bionic Man was published beginning in August 2011.
- Tale of Sand is a graphic novel published in 2012 based on a feature-length screenplay by Jim Henson and Jerry Juhl from 1967.
- Dark Matter was originally intended to be a television series, but was published as a comic series in 4 issues beginning in January 2012. After the comic's success, the story was produced as a TV series by Syfy in 2015.
- The Musical Monsters of Turkey Hollow is a graphic novel by Roger Langridge published in 2014 based on a screenplay from the 1960s by Jim Henson and Jerry Juhl. Henson began preproduction for the film but never moved forward with production. Eventually a TV film Turkey Hollow was produced and released in 2015.
- Aether & Empire, was originally conceived as a screenplay, but was produced as a 6 issue comic series starting in April 2016.
- The Power of the Dark Crystal is a comic adaptation of a screenplay of the same name that had been in development hell for a decade. The comic was released beginning in 2017.
- The unproduced episodes of Lost In Space were adapted to the comic series Irwin Allen's Lost in Space: The Lost Adventures.
- Ray Harryhausen Presents: War of the Elementals was based on an unmade film by Ray Harryhausen, about an attack by bat-like monsters.

== Original versions of produced scripts ==
Often during development of film projects, the screenwriter's original concepts are rewritten or abandoned, and the "original" script is adapted as a comic.

- Phoenix Without Ashes began as a screenplay and plan for a TV series created by Harlan Ellison. The series was produced for 16 episodes as The Starlost, but many changes were made to Ellison's original concept, and he removed his name from the credits. The Phoenix Without Ashes graphic novel was based on Ellison's original script and was published in 2010.
- Frank Miller's RoboCop is a comic adaptation of a script by Frank Miller of his vision for a RoboCop 2 film. The script used in the film was very different from Miller's original concept.
- The Star Wars, an adaptation of the original rough draft of George Lucas's screenplay for Star Wars. The Star Wars was published as an eight issue series by Dark Horse Comics beginning in September 2013.
- The original script by Harlan Ellison for the classic Star Trek episode The City on the Edge of Forever was adapted as a comic. It was published in 2014 as Star Trek: Harlan Ellison's Original The City On The Edge Of Forever Teleplay.
- Planet of the Apes: Visionaries is an adaptation of Rod Serling's original screenplay for Planet of the Apes. The comic was published in August 2018 by BOOM! Studios.
- An original script by William Gibson for the 1992 film Alien 3 was adapted into a comic in November 2018.
- A script for what ultimately became Godzilla (1998) was adapted into a fan-made webcomic in 2018.
- Colin Trevorrow's script for Star Wars: Episode IX – The Rise of Skywalker titled, Star Wars: Episode IX – Duel of the Fates was adapted into a fan-made webcomic in 2020.
- The original screenplay for Highlander by Gregory Widen was adapted into a 4-issue series beginning in December 2026.

== Continuations of canceled TV series ==
In some cases, a TV series is canceled even though further episodes had already been written, and the unproduced stories are produced as comics.

- The 2006 series Jericho was canceled after two seasons, ending with a cliffhanger episode. The prepared story lines were adapted and published as a comic series and collected as the graphic novel Jericho Season 3: Civil War. The series continued with Jericho Season 4.
- When The Clone Wars was canceled, there were 65 more episodes in development. One 4-episode arc was adapted into the comic series Darth Maul: Son of Dathomir.
- Buffy the Vampire Slayer was cancelled after 7 seasons. It continued with Season 8 being adapted into comics.
