= Shockwave, Darkside =

- Film poster
- Directed by: Jay Weisman
- Written by: Jay Weisman
- Produced by: Favorit Films, Red Giant Media, Pipeline Entertainment
- Starring: Mei Melançon, Bill Sage, Sonequa Martin-Green, Rich Ceraulo, Alexander Cendese
- Cinematography: Robert Fiske, Joe Gabriel
- Edited by: Eric Dow, Doug Fitch
- Music by: Andreas Weidinger
- Release date: August 22, 2014 (London)
- Running time: 92 minutes
- Language: English

Shockwave, Darkside is a 2014 American 3D science fiction film written and directed by Jay Weisman. It is produced by Favorit Films, Pipeline Entertainment and Red Giant Media. The UK Premiere occurred on August 22, 2014 at the London FrightFest Film Festival.

== Plot ==
A nano-plague has contaminated Earth's water supply, and after 60 years it reaches critical mass. The Unlights, an enemy faction, had earlier forced a population of outlaws and exiles to relocate to the Moon, where they were expected to die. The Unlights have now launched from Earth and are gathering in the south-west sector of the Moon's far side for a large ice-mining operation.

Lunar troops are sent into battle for control of the ice. One squad is shot down, and its five surviving soldiers are stranded behind enemy lines. They set out toward their extraction point through snipers and minefields with 36 hours of oxygen remaining. As their numbers fall, they make a discovery about the Moon.

It is the last Great War and lunar troops are sent into battle for the precious resource. However, one squad is shot down and the five surviving soldiers find themselves stranded. Cut off and behind enemy lines, they start a dangerous journey through snipers and minefields back to their extraction point with only 36 hours of oxygen left. As their numbers dwindle and nerves fray, they make discovery about the moon that just might save their lives.

== Cast ==
Main cast:

- Bill Sage as Dalton
- Mei Melançon as The Machine
- Sonequa Martin-Green as Private Lang
- Rich Ceraulo as Corporal Kim
- Alexander Cendese as Private Schorr

Other cast (in alphabetical order):

- Elwaldo Baptiste
- James Barrett
- Brianne Blessing
- Nedra Gallegos
- Gus Kelley
- C.R. Marchi
- Joe Sobalo Jr.

== Related ==
A prequel web-comic of the same name was published by Keenspot in 2011. Created and written by Jay Weisman. Pencil Artwork by Weilin Yang. Finishes by Youjun Yang. Colors by Kun Song. Letters & Edits by Benny R. Powell. The 3D aspect of the comic got mixed reviews. Crabcake Confidential stated "either my eyes are broken, or the 3D thing isn't working for me."

== Reviews ==
- Shockwave, Darkside (movie review)
- Frightfest 2014-Shockwave Darkside 3D Review
- Shockwave, Darkside review
- Shockwave, Darkside 3D
- FrightFest 2014 Day 2
