= Red Giant Entertainment =

American comic book publisher

Red Giant Entertainment, Inc.
- Traded as: OTCQB: REDG
- Predecessor: Castmor Resources, Ltd.
- Founded: 2005 in Nevada
- Founder: Benny R. Powell
- Country of origin: United States
- Headquarters location: Clermont, Florida
- Distribution: Diamond Book Distributors
- Key people: Benny R. Powell (CEO); Chris Crosby (CTO); Mark Fischbach Board member
- Publication types: Comic books
- Fiction genres: Superheroes
- Imprints: Absolute Comics
- Official website: www.redgiantentertainment.com

Red Giant Entertainment, Inc. is a Florida-headquartered comic book publisher and "transmedia" entertainment company established in 2005. Red Giant was founded by Benny R. Powell, former marketing writer for Priceline.com. Other key players included David Campiti, director and COO; and Chris Crosby, CTO and the CEO of Keenspot Entertainment. Mark "Markiplier" Fischbach joined the board in November 2014.

== History ==
The company was incorporated June 27, 2005, in Nevada under the name Castmor Resources, Ltd. Red Giant Entertainment, Inc., meanwhile, was established in Clermont, Florida, in 2010. Castmore acquired Red Giant Entertainment on June 11, 2012; changing its name to Red Giant Entertainment, Inc. on June 26, 2012.

On March 4, 2013, Red Giant acquired ComicGenesis, LLC ("ComicGenesis"), a Nevada limited liability company that operated a user-generated comics site that hosted over 10,000 independent webcomics.

David Campiti of Glass House Graphics joined Red Giant's board of directors in 2013, as board director and COO; he left the company in 2018.

== Works ==
=== Comics ===
==== Webcomics ====
Red Giant published webcomics with partner Keenspot. Titles included Wayward Sons: Legends, Exposure, Jade Warriors, Buzzboy, Medusa's Daughter, Katrina, and Porcelain.

==== Giant-Size Comics ====
Red Giant's Giant-Size Comics was a print comic book line of free, ad-supported anthology titles which debuted on May 3, 2014, as part of Free Comic Book Day. The line featured work by Mort Castle, story editor Brian Augustyn, and Larry Hama.

As of 2019, Red Giant began crowdfunding projects under the Absolute Comics imprint. Comics falling under this label are all set within one shared universe, with cross-over events happening frequently. Some of the series in the Absolute Comics Universe are White Widow, Dual Identity, and Wayward Sons.

==== Collections ====
- The Cartoon Art of Mike Deodato, Jr. (Dec 2013)
- Mike Deodato's Jade Warriors (Spring 2014)
- Mike Deodato's Comics & Stories (Summer 2014)
- Mike Deodato Jr's Sketchbook (2014)

==== Graphic novels ====
- Banzai Girl Volume 1 Dreams Betrayed (November 2014)
- Buzzboy: Sidekicks Rule! Paperback (January 3, 2012)
- Drow Tales Volume 1: Moonless Age TP Paperback (July 3, 2012)
- Exposure Volume 1 (January 21, 2014)
- Exposure Volume 2 Blind Faith (November 2014)
- Medusa's Daughter Graphic Novel HC (2012)
- Medusa's Daughter Graphic Novel Library HC (February 17, 2015)
- Roboy Red Graphic Novel Comic (2012)
- Wayward Sons Volume 1 (Wayward Sons: Legends) (December 2011)
- Wayward Sons Volume 2 (Wayward Sons: Legends) (February 2014)
- Wayward Sons Volume 3 (April 2014)
- Wayward Sons Volume 4 (October 2014)

=== Film ===
The following Red Giant Media film projects are in various stages of development, production or release:

- Niko: The Journey To Magika (Released on Hulu on December 12, 2014)
- Katrina (status: In production)
- Omphalos (2014) (status: post-production)
- Shockwave, Darkside (status: RELEASED; UK Premiere: August 21, 2014)

=== Television ===
The following Red Giant television projects are in various stages of development and production.

- Exposure (status: development announced 2013; Kevin VanHook producer)

=== Video Games and Apps ===
Bandai Namco Games America Inc. announced a partnership to provide more comic influenced games on July 23, 2014.

== Controversy ==
Red Giant became embroiled in controversy related to a benefit comic it sponsored in response to the March 2011 Tōhoku earthquake and tsunami. In April 2011 the company announced it was spearheading Japan Needs Heroes, a Kickstarter crowd-funded anthology project which was intended to benefit "victims of Japan's tragedies." Including a foreword by Stan Lee, and contributions from, among others, Larry Hama, Mike Deodato, and Peter David, the project was described this way:

Japan Needs Heroes is a comic book anthology project that will be released early summer 2011, with creators from across every genre and representing nearly every major comic book publisher. It will focus on stories of inspiration with messages of hope and promises of a better tomorrow by working with the heroes in each of us. It is expected to be between 200 to 300 pages and will be published in full color with its printing being provided at cost by the printer.

The project was fully funded in May 2011, and a second round of funding took place in 2013. By January 2014, however, nothing had been delivered to project backers. Finally, in January 2015, digital downloads were sent to the Kickstarter backers.

In regardings to the printed hardcover and paperback books, however, although Red Giant claimed the project had gone to the printer, as of at least February 2015 nothing had not been mailed to project backers. In the summer of 2015, at San Diego Comic-Con, Lee and Campiti displayed printed copies of Japan Needs Heroes (although still no hard copies had been delivered).

Finally, after many years of silence, Powell of Red Giant claimed that the books (and associated merchandise) had been held by the warehouse company and not released. Ultimately, Red Giant issued refunds and released the donations to the Japan Society.
