= Greylock =

Greylock may refer to:

- Gray Lock or Greylock, a Western Abenaki Missisquoi chief
- Greylock Capital Management, an asset management firm
- Greylock Partners, a venture capital firm
- Camp Greylock, a summer camp in Becket, Massachusetts
- Mount Greylock, the highest natural point in Massachusetts
  - Mount Greylock State Reservation, a forest preserve in Massachusetts
- Greylock Mountain, within the Sawtooth Range, near Atlanta, Idaho
- Greylock, the main character in the comic Grey Legacy
- Greylock, a fictional New Hampshire town in the TV series The Republic of Sarah
- Jack Greylock, a main character in the film Between Friends and the eponymous novel it was based on

== See also ==
- Grayleck
