= The Duck Webcomics =

Webcomic hosting platform

- Former name: Drunk Duck! (DrunkDuck.com)
- Website type: Webcomic hosting community
- Available in: English
- Owners: Dylan Squires (2002–2006); Platinum Studios (2006–2010); WOWIO (2010–2015); Community-managed (2015–present)
- Founder: Dylan Squires
- Website: theduckwebcomics.com
- Commercial: Yes
- Registration: Required for uploading comics
- Launched: 2002; 24 years ago
- Current status: Active

The Duck Webcomics, originally launched as Drunk Duck! in 2002, is an online webcomic hosting and community platform. An independent platform with thousands of titles, the site allows creators to publish their work, interact with readers, and participate in forums, community events, and collaborative projects.

After launching independently, the site was later owned by Platinum Studios and then WOWIO, which, although tumultuous, provided resources that helped the site continue operating.

In 2015 The Duck began the transition to management by its own community.

== History ==
=== Early years (2002–2005) ===
Drunk Duck was founded in 2002 by Dylan Squires as a free webcomics community site, primarily featuring amateur and independent creators. The name originates from Squires' pet duck: when the duck died, a friend drew it as though it were drunk rather than dead, and Squires decided the image "looked better," giving the site its original name. The name stuck and became part of the site's identity as a welcoming, egalitarian webcomic community.

By 2003, the site was rapidly attracting creators, partly due to bandwidth limitations at competing platforms such as Keenspace. Drunk Duck grew quickly during the mid-2000s webcomics boom, offering free hosting, commenting, forums, and archiving tools.

=== 2005 server crash and relaunch ===
In late 2005, Drunk Duck suffered a major server crash that resulted in the loss of all site data and backups. The hosting company reportedly shut down the server due to financial problems, leaving Drunk Duck!'s future uncertain.

On January 1, 2006, founder Dylan Squires announced that Drunk Duck would fully relaunch. A group of beta testers tested a rebuilt system, and the site was gradually reopened to the public, with many of the original features restored.

=== Platinum Studios era (2006–2010) ===
In September 2006, Drunk Duck was acquired by comics and media company Platinum Studios. Platinum's chairman Scott Mitchell Rosenberg announced plans to use the site as the company's primary online platform, publishing Platinum comics digitally before print and integrating Drunk Duck into a “full-circle commercialization” model aimed at identifying intellectual property for multimedia development.

As part of the transition, Drunk Duck founder Dylan Squires was named director of software development for Platinum Studios' New Media Group and launched DrunkDuck.com "version 2.0." The site moved to a dedicated server with daily backups and increased bandwidth, and was relaunched with an updated layout, improved browsing and search tools, and a universal navigation bar. New features included an integrated forum, private messaging system, and a "featured comics" section highlighting selected titles. Creators could designate a main page for their comics, including chapter listings, descriptions, and recommendations. "Platinum Accounts" were introduced to provide expanded hosting options and support site projects, including Drunk Duck comic anthologies.

The acquisition prompted immediate debate among webcomics creators and readers, with some welcoming the potential for greater exposure, and others expressing skepticism about corporate involvement and commercial terms. Platinum's public filings referenced "producer" agreements and other structures for IP exploitation, and several creators later reported disputes regarding contract terms and payments.

By 2010, the site's user base had grown to approximately 95,000 subscribed users, but hosted only a limited number of Platinum titles.

=== WOWIO era (2010–2015) ===
In June 2010, the digital publishing company WOWIO raised $1.7 million and purchased the online community WEvolt. One week later, WOWIO acquired DrunkDuck.com from Platinum Studios. At the time of its acquisition, Drunk Duck hosted around "24,000 comic strips and stories." (An SEC filing after the acquisition claimed the site hosted 3,000 strips and about 10 million monthly page views.) Between 2010 and 2013, Drunk Duck operated as one of WOWIO's portfolio sites. WOWIO undertook redesigns and platform changes during this period.

Beginning in mid-2013, however, the Drunk Duck site experienced extended outages. The platform disappeared offline in August 2013, briefly returned in September, and went down again.

=== Rebranding and community ownership (2015–present) ===
On October 10, 2013, the site was relaunched under a new name, TheDuckWebcomics.com. In early 2014, the original DrunkDuck.com URL was restored and redirected to the new domain.

In 2015, management of The Duck Webcomics transitioned to members of its own user community. Since the transition, the site has operated independently, maintaining forums, publishing tools, and community-run initiatives such as annual awards and collaborative events.

== Features and community ==
The Duck Webcomics provides:

- A library of thousands of independent, creator-owned webcomics, with free hosting, no upload limits, and support for multiple files at once. It offers customizable site templates, with the option to upload additional files for further customization, as well as tools for scheduling updates, managing archives, and RSS feeds for each comic
- Integrated forums and private messaging (known as PQ or Private Quack), allowing users to communicate without creating separate accounts; users can also create multiple comics under one username and act as assistants for other accounts
- User-run community events, awards, and collaborations, including the annual Drunk Duck Awards, which recognize outstanding comics and creators on the platform

The site's community features allow users to provide feedback and critiques to artists, engage in collaborative projects, and participate in interactive events. Notable community initiatives have included the Comic Review system for evaluating comics; Fightsplosion, a tournament-style competition for webcomics; and print anthologies featuring creator works. QuackCast, the site's official podcast, provides community updates, interviews, and behind-the-scenes insight, offering both creators and readers a way to connect beyond the comics themselves.

All services on The Duck Webcomics are currently accessible for free.

== Print anthologies ==
Drunk Duck published several print anthologies drawing from its community of creators:

- Drunk In Public: The Drunk Duck Collection Vol. 1 (Lulu.com, Sept. 2003) — features stories by more than twenty site creators.
- Drunk and Disorderly: The Drunk Duck Collection Vol. 2 (Lulu.com, July 2004) — focused on action-oriented and longer-form stories by community creators.

A third anthology, Drunk on Laughter, is mentioned in some community sources as being planned for late 2005, but its publication date and contents remain unclear and are not well documented in independent sources.

== Drunk Duck Awards ==
The Duck Webcomics periodically recognizes creators through the annual Drunk Duck Awards, highlighting notable webcomics in categories such as Best Overall Story, Best Art, Best Humor, and Best Newcomer. Winners have included titles such as Charby the Vampirate, Simply Sarah, and Modest Medusa.

The awards are community-driven, combining user voting with site selection. The first awards were held in 2007, initially presented in forums, and later adopted a comic-format presentation. Features such as “For Your Consideration” pages, design contests, and themed campaigns were added over time to engage creators. In 2020, judging moved to a Discord server following a site crash.

== Criticism ==
Community members have periodically criticized the site's ranking and voting systems. Historically, Drunk Duck used a “Top List” that ranked comics based on user votes, which generated debate regarding fairness and visibility. In response to community feedback, the Top List was eventually removed and replaced with “Most Popular” and “Most Recently Updated” lists, which rank comics based on traffic and recent activity. In forums, users have debated the fairness of how comics appear on the front page, and in a QuackCast episode, concerns were raised about the potential manipulation of ratings via multiple or fake accounts.

== Webcomics titles (selected) ==
The following is a selection of notable webcomics that originated on Drunk Duck / The Duck Webcomics, including titles with their own Wikipedia articles and others recognized as standouts among the hundreds of creator-owned comics hosted on the site.

- The Adventures of Gunny Bunny – Cult-favorite early Drunk Duck action comic
- BASO
- BitterSweet Candy Bowl – Early chapters debuted on Drunk Duck before moving to its own site and becoming a major independent webcomic
- Bounty Hunter – Early breakout action title
- Charby the Vampirate – by Amelius; one of the most famous Duck comics; extremely long-running and a fan-community cornerstone (multiple Duck Awards)
- Cowboys & Aliens — first ran online before publication by Platinum Studios Comics
- The Devon Legacy – Large-scale sci-fi/fantasy epic; long-running and award-recognized
- The Dreamer — by Lora Innes; nominated in multiple categories in both the 2008 and 2009 Drunk Duck Awards
- Evil Dawn
- Gods of Arr-Kelaan – Fantasy-adventure comic by Chuck Rowles; hosted on DrunkDuck
- Grey Legacy – Science-fiction comic by Wayne Wise & Fred Wheaton
- Heroes Alliance / Heroes Unite — large collaborative superhero universe; major community project
- I Was Kidnapped By Lesbian Pirates From Outer Space – By Megan Rose Gedris (Ro Salarian); later syndicated and published in print
- Life And Death
- Magical Misfits – Staple fantasy strip from early Drunk Duck days; long-time community fixture
- Mindfold – Fantasy comic; considered one of the site's most respected titles
- Modest Medusa — By Jake Richmond; early chapters appeared on Drunk Duck before the webcomic moved off-platform and gained a following elsewhere
- The Narrative of the Life of a Struggling Artist – Longstanding autobiographical strip heavily referenced in Duck award history
- Pewfell — by Chuck Whelon
- Pinky TA — by Ozoneocean; big early-era standout
- The Pirate Balthasar
- Scorch
- Simply Sarah – Winner of Best Overall Story Comic (Drunk Duck Awards, 2023)
- Super Temps
- The Surreal Adventures of Edgar Allan Poo — By Dwight MacPherson; later collected into a trade paperback by Shadowline
- Used Books – Long-running drama/mystery comic
- Vampire Phantasm
- Wolf
- YU+ME: dream – By Megan Rose Gedris (Ro Salarian)

== See also ==
- Keenspot
- Modern Tales
- Webtoon
- Webcomics Nation
- ACT-I-VATE
- Tapas
