= Elsinore (comics) =

Comic book series

Elsinore is an American comic book published by Devil's Due Productions, written by Ken Lillie-Paetz.

Elsinore tells the tale of Murchison, a disgraced doctor who was recruited by the titular asylum in order to help prevent the apocalypse. The series was slated to run for nine issues and eventually be collected into a trade paperback. Only five issues were ever published. Issue five shipped in February 2006. Mark Sparacio did the art on issue five under the Devil's Due publishing house.

== History ==
The comic was originally published by Alias Comics, but moved to their current publisher as of issue #4. While at Alias, the book was pencilled by Brian Denham, who also submitted a few pages to issue #4 (amid an array of guest artists), as well as covers to issues #4 and 5. While additional material was completed by Brian Denham, Mark Sparacio and Kelly Mellings based on the script by Ken Lillie-Paetz, the story remains unfinished.

In the first two issues, two pages were printed incorrectly, leaving the lettering out entirely. In issue #1, this did not affect the plot, but did affect giving some insight to the main character of Dr. Murchison (who was not introduced until page 17 of issue #1). In #2, however, a key plot point was missing in the dialogue. To make up for this, and to encourage new readers to pick up the book after its transition to Devil's Due, the publisher made the first three issues available for free online. Online editions of Elsinore #1-5 are available at www.pullboxonline.com and at WOWIO.

The electronic-industrial band Weave composed a companion soundtrack for Elsinore called Cell 29A. Additionally, Weave's video for their song "While i Bern Their Bodies Kleen" features characters from Elsinore.

== See also ==
- List of Devil's Due Publishing publications
