= Andreas Weidinger =

Andreas Weidinger (born 1970) is a German composer, producer, conductor, and arranger for film, television, and records.

== Early life and education ==
Weidinger began his musical training at age nine with lessons in piano and music theory. After his high school diploma, Weidinger moved to Berlin to study bassoon, music theory and political science at the University of Arts and started working on his first film-music projects. He then was accepted at the University of Music and Performing Arts Munich as one of the first students studying in the newly opened Film Scoring program.

== Career ==
Weidinger has composed music for over 100 films as well as classical contemporary orchestral and chamber music works.

He has worked with oboist Stefan Schilli, Chinese cheng player Wu-Wei and members of the Bavarian Radio Symphony Orchestra and has a long term working relationship with German director Tim Trageser. He has scored films with composer Christoph Zirngibl.

His recent credits include the 3-D Sci-Fi Drama Shockwave, Darkside with director Jay Weisman, "The Banshee Chapter" with director Blair Erickson, the film "The Teacher" with director Tim Trageser, and Playing Hooky. and the 2014 Ironclad: Battle for Blood.

== Selected credits ==
- A Tempting Offer (2006)
- Years of the Storm (2006)
- Santa Claus in the House (2008)
- My Father (2009)
- Angel of Revenge (2010)
- The Teacher (2010)
- Mandy and the Sea (2011)
- The Banshee Chapter (2012)
- Officer Lucas – 7 Faces Of Fear (2012)
- Welcome to MeckPomm
- Shockwave Darkside (2013)
- Ironclad: Battle for Blood (2014)
- Playing Hooky (2015)
