= Gods of Arr-Kelaan =

Webcomic

The Gods of Arr-Kelaan
- Author(s): Chuck Rowles (art and writing) and Steve Rowles (effects/coloring)
- Website: www.theduckwebcomics.com/The_Gods_of_ArrKelaan/ www.rmcomics.com/Mirror/Current/
- Current status/schedule: Tuesday, Friday
- Launch date: 2002
- End date: 2010(?)
- Genre(s): Fantasy, adventure, humour

The Gods of Arr-Kelaan was a fantasy/humor webcomic drawn and written by illustrator Chuck Rowles and aided with visual effects and the coloring help of his brother Steve Rowles. It is hosted on its own site, as well as some publications still found on a webcomic portal/community known as The Duck (formerly Drunk Duck).

The comic has been on hiatus since Early 2010. The comic at its most popular updated twice a week, and gathered approximately 4400 unique hits per day. It has been featured on Comixpedia, the Webcomics Examiner and Comic World News, and in print in the Weekender. Rowles has also done book signings.

The world of Arr-Kelaan was created in 1986 by Len Zaikoski, a friend of Chuck Rowles, for use in a role-playing game. Rowles initially contributed one deity, then a few more, then found himself with a full pantheon and stories to tell about them. He started drawing the comic to do so, initially intending it to be in pamphlet form but ending up taking it online. Gods has been published in several paperback print collections, and one of its five major story arcs is only available in print.

Arr-Kelaan from or near the equator. In the upper left is the sea of Taal Immerisan, the center of the campaign setting.

== Setting ==
As the interstellar cruise ship Traveller on its maiden voyage (with Earthling passengers and a multiplanetary crew) comes under pirate attack, its captain panics and does the impossible, sending his vessel plunging into an alternate dimension. Upon waking on the world of Arr-Kelaan, the survivors discover they have gained the power of gods: they are indestructible, they can hear the thoughts of mortals, create anything with a mere thought and even bring back the dead. Arr-Kelaan itself is something out of a fantasy novel, with mages and dragons.

=== Campaign ===
Zaikoski's Arr-Kelaan grew into a full-scale Dungeons & Dragons campaign setting, compatible with 2nd edition rules and available online. In contrast to many RPG-derived works, Rowles' Arr-Kelaan is scantly recognizable. The geography and the basic D&D elements of a vaguely medieval society and polytheistic/henotheistic pantheons are the same, but whereas the game focuses on adventurers in a world stably ruled by Travellers-turned-gods for millennia, Gods portrays the effects of the Travellers on the world and each other when they first arrive and establish themselves.

== Structure ==
Gods shows its offline origins in its full-page paperback layout. Stories are organized into lengthy arcs, which in turn are split into "issues" of roughly two dozen pages each. Pages are designed to form a whole more than to stand on their own; conversations often carry over for several, and there are few overt last-panel punchlines. Gods is normally black and white, although issue "covers" and "Volume Zero" are in color. Partway through "Consequences" "Gods" made a switch to full colour, there are plans to add color to all pages from "Consequences".

The comic's plot is character-driven, to the point of largely leaving the mages and dragons on the wayside: When asked how Gods fits into the fantasy genre, Rowles answered "With a shoehorn, I think." The great number of characters forms an ensemble cast, though in practice Ronson has received the most exposure.

== Stories ==
The stories are not presented in chronological order.

- "As Luck Would Have It" - Sharra and Loki find themselves in opposition over a mortal wager. Part of "Myths and Legends".

- "Volume 0" - details Ronson waking up on Arr-Kelaan, uncertain of how he got there and slowly discovering his new godly abilities. This story and the next do feature a party of adventurers, only to have Ronson's presence irreparably break their paradigm.
- "For the Death of Kings" - Details one of Ronson's first adventures, which takes place several months after Volume 0 and features the first appearances of Claremont and Salsmen. The story is available only in print, in the first book of "Going Home." (Written from 1991–1993)

- The Price of Knowledge - Originally planned as a featurette for the comic book publication of Death of Kings, Price was instead gathered into one place as a chapter in the former's book release. The two take place simultaneously.
- "A Tolerable Day" - A wordless short story that gives an example of Ronson's life. The story has been printed in the first Night Gig Sampler and reprinted in the book version of "Myths & Legends." (Started in 2002, finished in 2006)

- "Going Home" - Details Ronson's travels to find the ship he crashed on Arr-Kelaan with, as he encounters various other Traveller gods and how they have adapted to their new powers. Features the most pivotal single event of the new pantheon. The print version is slightly expanded with a handful of pages through the story that are not present online. (Written from 2003–2005)

- "The Guy on the Rock" - Ronson and his followers come upon a man in the desert. The story is four pages long and takes place between the first and second parts of Going Home. It is printed in the second book of Going Home.

- "Consequences" - The ongoing story, taking place months after Going Home. Consequences takes a broader look into the state of the planet and has several major storylines. (Started in 2006, finished in 2009)

- "Lucky Break" - General Shrub was banished to a small island in the middle of nowhere. It would take a lot of luck to get him out of there. Features the Sharras. The story is an offshoot of the events in Going Home, it has been printed in "Drunk Duck Volume 2." and The Gods of Arr-Kelaan: Short Stories Volume One
- "The Point of Some Return" - A party of adventurous seeks a cleric to revive a fallen comrade. This story shows the long-term results of some events in Consequences.
- "Scared To Death" - A follower of Shadowscared dies but his soul is nowhere to be found, Thanantria sends Shadowscared to track him down.

- "Fear of Bunnies" - Bunny objects to Zeus' treatment of his followers while Shadowscared watches on. Part of "Myths and Legends".
- "The Love of Knowledge" - Claremont travels to the top of the highest mountain in Arr-Kelaan for an experiment, to his surprise Wenya is waiting for him. Part of "Myths and Legends".

- "This Guy Walks Into A Bar" - Features Brindle and Aanlonar from Going Home, many years later. The story is an offshoot of the events in "Going Home" and is printed in "Drunk Duck Volume 3 and The Gods of Arr-Kelaan: Short Stories Volume One."
- "Dead Man Working" - A follower of Bikk's gets unusually creative to make a profit. The story is a collaboration between Chuck Rowles and Sean Howard of squidi.net, it has been printed in "NightGig of the Living Dead #2 and The Gods of Arr-Kelaan: Short Stories Volume One."

- "Family Matters" - To protect his daughter Claremont seeks the aid of several different gods. Part of "Myths and Legends".

- "Tankard of Trouble" - Many years after two miraculous tankards of endless ale were given to a couple of soldiers, Ronson steps in to rectify a situation he had not been aware of. The story is an offshoot of the events in Going Home it was printed in "Drunk Duck Volume 1." and The Gods of Arr-Kelaan: Short Stories Volume One"

- "Dealing with Deities" - Bikk decides to recruit Teldin into his service. Part of "Myths and Legends".
- "Not All Prophets are Profitable" - Kerrimachus has a rather confusing encounter with Sephin. Part of "Myths and Legends".

- "Myths & Legends" - Well over a century after all other stories, the Gods of Arr-Kelaan have settled in and become a worshipped pantheon. The story is told from the point of view of mortals, with numerous flashbacks and tales. Ronson is not the main character. Myths & Legends was originally written in 1996, and rescripted (and somewhat revised) in 2006, making it the second oldest of all stories.

== Characters ==
=== Travellers ===
The Traveller gods are the survivors of the spaceship crash, who awakened years if not decades later all over the world to find themselves apparently appointed its rightful deities. Mentally they're unchanged, and a central theme of the comic is their adaptation to their new positions. Most are human beings in shape; two are of demihuman races and three of monstrous humanoid races, all endemic to Earth's universe. The name is a slight misnomer, as several are from the Competent Offender, the pirate vessel that attacked the Traveller and in fact supply much of the pantheon's sinister side.

As deities, each is associated with a domain that reflects their personality or traits (the survivors, and thus the domains, were "almost certainly" not determined randomly. ) What they're actually known as can vary: Salsmen of Deceit is much more likely to be worshipped as Salsmen of Power. They hear mortal prayers associated either with them or their domains. In "Myths and Legends", a large group of people unhappy and afraid draws both Bunny (happiness) and Shadowscared (fear). One without a following hears everything in the vicinity.

Their godly powers amount to reality warping around themselves: spontaneous item generation, flight, teleporting themselves and others to where they've already been, slowing their perception of time, polymorphing, telepathy, the traditional fireballs and lightning bolts, etc. Gods generate divine power spontaneously, without any external source, and in a very real sense they are beings of this power: Their appearance is now entirely a personal choice (many loom huge when appropriate, Claremont's gone subatomic), with a default to how they see themselves , and they are impervious to physical damage and pain, up to and including atmospheric reentry without a vehicle. They can sleep but need not to. The Traveller Gods are not entirely immortal when facing each other, non-Traveller gods or legendary magic items.

The Travellers start as rough equals, but their powers are limited by their levels of skill in wielding them.. Making new life is thus far too complex, resurrection is only possible if the soul is available. The acquisition of magical artifacts has given some gods an advantage.

Priests and clerics draw upon their patrons' strength as magical power. The closer the followers' beliefs are to the ideals of their god, the more power they have. The gods could leave Arr-Kelaan and settle on another world, although their powers would be weaker. This is the same drop in power experienced by earth gods who came to Arr-Kelaan.

(An illustration of just about all of the gods can be found at http://www.rmcomics.com/Cast.htm.)

- Ronson B. Eichler – God of Apathy/Alcohol, a passenger on the Traveller. The main character of most of the stories and the author's first creation. A balding man, almost perpetually unhappy, Ronson was once a successful businessman living a marvelous life on Earth – until the death of his wife, Emily, left him an alcoholic wreck and practically emotionally dead. Though he's a recluse and prefers not being bothered by prayers, Ronson rarely ignores people who need his help. He began his success story with a brewery and brought beer to Arr-Kelaan, making him the God of Alcohol as well. Unable to become drunk, but still spends much of his time manifesting and consuming drinks. Ronson has no desire for glory, no grand plans for Arr-Kelaan. He initially refuses to be worshipped, not seeing why he should be or why he'd have any right for it. After he caves in his actual temples lie very few and far between, and his clerics are in taverns doing much the same as him. Whatever it is that Sephin hears seems to have appointed him the leader of the gods; his response is to drink beer and really wish it hadn't. Inti in the comic and theologians in the original setting both surmise that such leadership may actually be beneficial by tempering others' desires to make demands of their followers and shape the planet in their image.
- Bikk – God of Trade/Commerce, the chief financier and navigator of the Competent Offender. A man obsessed with wealth, power and status, Bikk's first move on Arr-Kelaan was to establish a church of himself. His ultimate goal is his boyhood dream of world domination. Though happy on Arr-Kelaan Bikk has expressed a desire to return and conquer Earth. Bikk is an expert at manipulation and negotiation, highly deceitful although he will stick to any written contract. Physically Bikk resembles a relatively normal man with a huge nose, and always dresses in the latest fashions. Bikk's church is a cross between a religious institute and a commercial one, his opulent temples often doubling as merchants guilds or banks. The church exhibits all the negative traits of capitalism and will go to any lengths to make a profit; on the other hand, Zaikoski's prototypical Arr-Kelaan describes it as a major investor in roads and other trading infrastructure.
- Beyurn – Goddess of War, the first mate on the Traveller with some kind of military background. Beyurn is an honourable, hot-headed, pointy-eared, slightly built juhlann, a member of a conveniently elf-like race native to Earth's universe. As Goddess of War Beyurn takes more interest in planning and strategy than taking part in combat however she is still a formidable fighter and makes full use of her divine powers alongside traditional combat skills. Beyurn believes that as a Goddess it is her duty to change Arr-Kelaan for the better, she seeks to promote peace, stability and Civilization. These goals have led to a strong alliance with Mike. In person, Beyurn reacts to every sign of trouble as if the barbarians were at the gates. In her defense, they often are.
- Claremont Grimsby – God of Knowledge, a passenger on the Traveller. Claremont's is a keen mind endlessly fascinated with the universe, slow to anger but just and resolute. Gray-haired, bespectacled and bearing a moustache, he suits his role like a glove. It took deification to make him religious. Claremont is a friend of Ronson, and Emily's brother, and his clerics are the scientists of the world. Claremont's information networks are rivaled only by Bikk's. He weds a mortal named Wenya a good time after his arrival, and decades later has a daughter named Hazel, becoming (in his own words) "the first god to take parenting seriously".
- Mike – God of Honor/Valor, chief of security on the Traveller. Mike's a blonde-haired ox of a man without an unkind bone in his body. When he woke up with his strange new powers, he did the logical thing and became a superhero. For four years, he was the defender of the city of Kinidrius with a strong Superman motif both in his clothing (a blue suit, with a red cape) and his actions (catching evildoers, saving kittens from burning buildings, the works). Like Beyurn, Mike was shocked to learn the full extent of his godly abilities. He left Kinidrius, planning to teach humans to care for themselves rather than rely on him. He kept the outfit.
- Salsmen D'elgadath – God of Evil/Deceit, captain of the Competent Offender. Brother of Thanantria. Salsmen is a hulking man with a strong, roguish charm spoiled by his sinister air, and the primary antagonist. He's megalomaniacal and believes himself to be the one true god of the world. Salsmen's combination of ruthlessness, strength and intelligence makes him likely the greatest threat to Arr-Kelaan: will can attack for fun when he can, make grand plans when it's required and coerce or intimidate others to his side. Salsmen is a major character in "For The Death of Kings" and "Consequences", and a bit player elsewhere. He was originally planned as the god of deceit before being promoted to the primary antagonist – his name is a play on "salesman."
- Shadowscared (John Shadowscar) – God of Fear (being afraid), captain of the Traveller. He's afraid of almost everything, from ordinary fears like heights to fear of Abraham Lincoln. He was first called "Shadowscared" by Sephin, but in unenthusiastic company; most likely Sephin was just channeling the actual coiner of the name. Shadowscared's cloak makes him invisible and intangible even to other gods.
- Sharra – Goddess(es) of Fortune and Misfortune, a passenger on the Traveller. An attractive black woman who was split into her opposite aspects in combat with a non-Traveller deity. The two get along well enough, but calling on one can bring the attention of the other – or both. Their familiar is a talking dog, Pilfo, a boy who lost his humanity in the same battle (but appears to regain it as a young human man on his time off).
- Krushcor – God of Battles, crew member on the Competent Offender. An Ares to Beyurn's Athena, the two get along like oil and water. He relishes fighting and to the point of taking on fellow Travellers barehanded. For his domain Krushcor is surprisingly well groomed, polite and properly spoken, even possessing a form of charm through his childlike honesty. Mainly he seeks to enjoy himself, though finding a satisfying opponent is quite hard – and he doesn't particularly care about whom he hurts. Krushcor first properly appears in "Consequences" after cameos and mentions. It is blasphemy against Krushor to resurrect the dead; this rule evolved from a punishment enforced by Thanantria during Consequences.
- Dulcifer – Goddess of Love/Romance, passenger on the Traveller. A refined, composed, sleek raven-haired woman who wrote romance novels or other related books as a human. In Zaikoski's prototypical, not necessarily applicable, descriptions of the world she and Ronson are close. She first meets him and his aura of indifference in "Consequences"; in "Myths and Legends", set decades after, they appear next to each other in a crowd.
- Bunny – Goddess of Happiness, a passenger on the Traveller. Bunny is a friendly, open, blonde young woman with an inexhaustible supply of perkiness. She looks and acts much like a cheerleader.
- Thanantria – Goddess of Death, crew member on the Competent Offender. Originally called Nan. The sister of Salsmen is grim and blunt both in looks and in personality. She is defined largely by her tasks – seeing to the fallen – which by her account are not a choice. She gains and befriends the skeleton god-staff Thanatos by exchanging it with her brother for a soul-drinking sword. With it, she's the ultimate authority over death on Arr-Kelaan.
- Kerrimachus – God of Disease, passenger on the Traveller. A small, pale, dapper man who believes that the creation of plagues is crucial to the development of the world in a Darwinian sense. As he is known to have repeatedly failed medical school, his real motive could be spite. Kerrimachus is European and may have something against Americans, or perhaps just Alden and Claremont. Sephin has foretold the death of Kerrimachus at the hands of Trista, assuming Sephin told/actually knows the truth. Even if it is true, it may not happen for a long, long time.
- Alden – Goddess of Medicine.
- V'lnn – Goddess of Pain. V'lnn is a reptilian humanoid who served on the Competent Offender; since deification she remained loyal to Salsmen. Little is known of V'lnn other than that she believes that pain offers pleasure, tries to avoid doing anything that lessens pain, and distrusts Bikk.
- Durrill – God of Craftsmen/Artisans, chief engineer on the Traveller. A member of a conveniently dwarflike race in Earth's dimension, their short height being the result of high gravity on their homeworld Trellinda. Durrill is an extremely skilled engineer and prone to get highly excited over his latest project.
- Darkmarr – God of Assassins/Thieves.
- Sploon – God of Hate/Prejudice.
- Isurus – God of Nightmares, crew member on the Competent Offender. Isurus is a short tempered and violent deity with a sadistic streak that leads him to routinely inflict mortals with nightmares for enjoyment. Isurus possess powers over dreams that even experienced deities lack. Physically Isurus resembles a brown-skinned human with a horse's head.
- Providence – God(s) of Music/Art. A divine band, whose members are able to play any instrument they choose.
- Luranna Greenglade – Goddess of Nature. Luranna is an environmentalist named by her hippie parents and the only god known to communicate with Arr-Kelaan itself and has become "one with nature" after being told everything Arr-Kelaan experienced since its birth as a molecular cloud. Luranna is the only Traveller god not visible on the cast page.

=== Notable characters ===
- Sephin - The Oracle of Leshan-Faar is a laid-back, perky and highly infuriating man in a Hawaiian shirt and sunglasses. His background and the extent of his considerable powers are unknown, but he claims to know absolutely everything (but not all at once) and that the planet talks to him. The former boast is backed up by the way Sephin's unhampered by traditional chronology and makes references to future events, and he's also shown massive magical and technological know-how. Sephin does not age. The Traveller gods owe their lives and positions to his foresight, and he can often be seen setting things up with varying degrees of subtlety to go the way he knows they will. If he ever knows why, he's not talking. In Myths and Legends he's a seemingly helpless agent of causality, in Consequences the deliberate proverbial butterfly.
- Wenya - A scientist of exceptional skill and a capable adventurer. She never joined the scientific institutions, Claremont's priesthood, not being religious. Her life's work was to prove the existence of an invisible third moon, which led her to enormous lengths to reach Claremont himself as he made the moon visible for a brief while. Their meeting led to co-research, marriage and an eventual child, Hazel. Like all god's companions, Wenya is immortal.
- Hazel - The daughter of Claremont and Wenya, who unlike her parents has no aptitude or interest in science and studied combat with Beyurn, eventually becoming her follower. Hazel left the floating city of the gods to live as a mortal and took the life of a hero. By all accounts she was quite successful at this. Surprisingly for the daughter of a god, magic makes Hazel queasy. Hazel first appears as a main character of Myths and Legends, having grown old, retired and now living as a hermit.
- Teldin - A valiant and retired hero. The second main character of Myths and Legends. Teldin was once tricked into working for Bikk until Hazel, on one of her quests, showed him the error of his ways. Thankfully Bikk did not kill him when he quit, but instead told him that the one he loved would die an early death. This turned out to be a half-truth. Bikk knew about Hazel's potion that could make her immortal, and he guessed(correctly) that Hazel would never take it.
- Inti - The non-Traveller sun god, and the only old deity known to have left the world peacefully. The current story is centered around his final days on Arr-Kelaan. Inti is dressed in largely Mesoamerican garb, described by Chuck Rowles as "Part Incan, part Aztec and part Dwarfish," and comes across as kind and unassuming when he's not being 20 meters tall.
- Trista - Princess of Panvonia. According to Sephin, Trista is fated to kill Kerrimachus. Attempting to protect himself, Kerrimachus attempted to kill Trista first. To prevent this, Hazel gave her a potion created by Claremont with the aid of several other gods, originally meant for Hazel herself. This potion gave Trista immunity to disease, physical injury, pain and death (until she wishes it). It also means that her enemies have no knowledge of her unless she wishes it, making Sephin's prophecy quite plausible.
- Satan: Satan has been at work in Gods of Arr-Kelaan since the beginning, he was the mysterious entity holding Emily hostage. Satan revealed himself in part 2 of Consequences, he appears as a human with small horns, smart yet casual modern attire and completely white eyes. In conversation Satan is a smooth talker with a cheerful, friendly attitude and casual acknowledgement of the wickedness of his designs, overall Satan's attitude is highly evocative of Salsman's. Satan enjoys damning souls whether or not they justly deserve Hell's torments, he has a particular fondness for capturing other gods. It is later revealed that this is for the gods to serve as batteries for a machines that will allow gods to return to Earth.

=== Secondary characters ===
- Emily - Ronson's late wife. The two were very much in love until she died of cancer on Earth five years before Ronson crashed on Arr-Kelaan Her ghost occasionally appear before Ronson, but only to disappear shortly after. He screamed her name at night. It was discovered that Satan had used her as bait to lure Ronson into a trap and bind the both of them in hell.

It is claimed by Satan that, when Ronson became a god, his desire for her was enough to call her out of heaven to him. However, Satan's claim has been called into question by Inti, who stated that neither Satan nor Ronson had the power to pull Emily from Heaven.

- Brindle - One of Ronson's first "followers". Ronson first encountered Brindle in the desert, where he was attempting to run away from the General Shrub's army. Brindle accompanied Ronson through much of Going Home, and left towards the end when Ronson set up a tavern for him to run.

The following years are good to him as he minds the bar and sires offspring. Brindle becomes a man devoted to his patron's way of not getting devoted: Laid-back and easygoing as only someone who has not getting worked up as a teaching can be, yet he doesn't care that much about the rules and gets involved whenever the well-being of those dear to him is jeopardized. This makes Ronson amiably noncommittal.

- Aanlonar - Ronson's second "follower", he was a friend of Brindle's in General Shrub's army, and eventually followed Ronson as well on his journey. Aanlonar is an elf of unusually large size, though he claims this is a "glandular disorder". Other people suspect that he is not pure elf, but likely has some mixed blood from an ogre. Aanlonar eventually left Ronson (with Ronson's blessing) for a life of defending justice by joining Mike.
- General Shrub - An unpleasant man, he created a large army on the orders of Beyurn.
- Grox - A brog (a sentient species on Arr-Kelaan). Formerly violent and angry, but eventually changed after meeting Mike. Grox runs Mike's school of ethics and justice.

== Print collections ==
- The Gods of Arr-Kelaan: Going Home (Book 1) ISBN 0-9748960-0-4
- The Gods of Arr-Kelaan: Going Home (Book 2) ISBN 0-9748960-2-0
- The Gods of Arr-Kelaan: Myths & Legends ISBN 0-9748960-3-9
