= G.R.A.V.E. Grrrls: Destroyers of the Dead =

Comic book mini-series

- G.R.A.V.E. Grrrls: Destroyers of the Dead #1 - By Alex Ross

Publication information
- Publisher: Midnight Show; The Scream Factory
- Schedule: Monthly
- Format: Limited series
- Genre: Horror
- Publication date: 2005 – 2008
- No. of issues: 3

Creative team
- Created by: Scott Licina and Ken Wolak
- Written by: Scott Licina
- Artist: Ken Wolak
- Colorist: Ken Wolak

G.R.A.V.E. Grrrls: Destroyers of the Dead is a 2005 comic book mini-series.

== Publication history ==
G.R.A.V.E. Grrrls: Destroyers of the Dead was published as a monthly three-issue comic book limited series by Midnight Show in 2005.

It was re-released by The Scream Factory in a digital edition for a brief time only on WOWIO in April 2008.

== Plot synopsis ==
A new nano-technology developed to cure Alzheimer's disease (the Project: Born Again chip) is somehow bringing the dead back to life with an insatiable hunger for human flesh, and it's going to take three “enhanced” female government ops known as the G.R.A.V.E. (Genetically Refined And Virally Enhanced) Grrrls to solve the mystery and put the dead back to bed. But that only raises more questions- both to the zombie plague and their own origins.
