= The Dreamer (webcomic) =

Webcomic by Lora Innes

Publication information
- Publisher: IDW
- Schedule: Weekly
- Format: Webcomic
- Genre: Historical Romance
- Publication date: 2007-present
- Main character: Beatrice Whaley

Creative team
- Created by: Lora Innes
- Written by: Lora Innes
- Artist: Lora Innes
- Penciller: Lora Innes
- Letterer: Lora Innes
- Colorist(s): Alan Evans; Tina McGovern; Michael Motter; Julie Wright

The Dreamer is a webcomic written and drawn by Lora Innes. It stopped updating in August 2017. The comic has been running since 2007. In 2009 a collected edition was published by IDW Publishing.

== Synopsis ==
Beatrice "Bea" Whaley seems to have it all; the seventeen-year-old high school senior is beautiful, wealthy and the star performer of the drama club. And with her uncle's connections to Broadway theater, the future looks bright ahead of her. Little does she know that her future might actually be brighter behind her.

Bea begins having vivid dreams about a brave and handsome soldier named Alan Warren—a member of an elite group known as Knowlton's Rangers that served during the American Revolutionary War. Prone to keeping her head in the clouds, Bea welcomes her nightly adventures in 1776; filled with danger and romance they give her much to muse about the next day. But it is not long before Beatrice questions whether her dreams are simply dreams or something more. Each night they pick up exactly where the last one ended. And the senses—the smell of musket shots and cannons, the screams of soldiers in agony, and that kiss—are all far more real than any dream she can remember.

== Characters ==
=== 21st Century Cast ===
==== Beatrice Whaley ====
Bea Whaley has big dreams for her future. The seventeen-year-old wants nothing more than to star in theater productions after she graduates. And it seems like it might happen–her Uncle Hercules, a Broadway costume designer, has already introduced her to famous producers, directors and choreographers. She doesn’t care much for books or school work, and would rather spend her time daydreaming, singing, acting, or hanging out with her friends. A bit shy and awkward in social situations, Bea lets herself go when she's performing, which might the reason she loves the stage so much.

At the start of her senior year, she begins having vivid dreams about the American Revolution. She soon becomes convinced the dreams are real–they always start where the last one ended, and she discovers that some of the events in her dreams actually happened. As she tries to figure out what is happening to her, she pushes away her closest friends and family in order to dive deeper into her dreams, exploring the world of 18th century America and the interesting people she meets there.

==== Benjamin Cato ====
Nineteen-year-old Ben Cato is a year older than the other seniors, since he repeated a grade in middle school. It was the wake up call he needed, and he decided to stop hanging out with the wrong crowd and take school more seriously. As the starter quarterback on the High School football team, scouts noticed him his junior year. But his season ended abruptly with a severe knee injury. Senior year he continues to play on the team, despite no longer being a contender for a college scholarship.

Ben has an overcoming spirit and a constant smile. Rather than allow the change of plans to bring him down, he tries a new direction for his life: acting. He has secretly held an interest in theater, attending all the school plays. From the audience of these productions Ben took notice of the school's leading actress–Beatrice Whaley. When the two audition together for Romeo and Juliet, he takes a chance and asks her out. And since she's been waiting five years for him to notice her, she promptly agrees!

==== Elizabeth Winters ====
Liz Winters and Bea Whaley have been best friends since elementary school. But if they hadn’t bonded then, they might never have become friends at all! The two girls are polar opposites. Where Bea is an explosion of emotions, Liz is reserved and patient. Where Bea is reckless, Liz is cautious. Where Bea speaks her mind without thinking, Liz bites her tongue and keeps her foot out of her mouth. At the beginning of senior year, Bea's cousin John asks Liz to be his date for the Halloween dance and Liz eagerly agrees, despite fearing Bea's reaction. John shares some of Bea's fiery Irish temperament which they get from their parents, and his ability to speak his mind and express himself are attractive to Liz. She wishes she could let loose more, but when she tries to share her opinions, it often blows up in her face.

==== Yvette Howe ====
Yvette met Liz and Bea at the end of middle school when she moved to Boston from New Orleans with her single mother. Being wallflowers themselves, the girls welcomed the shy new girl into their exclusive friendship, and the three quickly became inseparable. It didn’t take long, however, for Yvette to fall in love with the trendy fashions of Boston and New York, and she quickly came into her own. She worked hard to get rid of her Creole accent and has become a fashionista like the best of them. She adds spice and a hint of naughtiness to the trio. Despite remaining close to Liz and especially Bea, Yvette has expanded her social circle and is far more popular than her quiet friends. When Yvette takes a special interest in the dreams that Bea is having, Bea feels she is the one friend she can trust. As a result, their friendship deepens even as Bea pushes everyone else away.

==== John Mulligan ====
John Mulligan is Bea Whaley's hot headed, loud mouthed, and often tactless cousin. Since Bea's mother and father work long, tireless hours, John's parents became second parents to Bea, and as such, he's practically a brother to her. His father's flamboyant profession–theatrical costume design–embarrasses him. John wants to have a respectable career, and has set his mind on attending Columbia University to study law. Luckily, learning comes easily to him–a bit too easily, however, and being naturally smart has allowed him to become a lazy smart alec. He decides to ask Liz Winters to the Halloween dance, despite being Bea's best friend, because after spending so many years around his cousin, a girl with a bit more poise and restraint is a breath of fresh air.

=== 18th Century Cast ===
==== Major Alan Warren ====
Orphaned at the age of ten, Alan Warren's Aunt Mary raised him alongside his cousins on their apple farm in Roxbury, Massachusetts. Alan's oldest cousin, Dr. Joseph Warren, had left home for Boston to start a medical practice; there he discovered liberty, politics and Samuel Adams. Only fifteen at the time, Alan quickly got caught up in his cousin's political protests and joined Sam Adams’ Sons of Liberty, much to his aunt's dismay. Alan used his inheritance, at only eighteen, to buy an orchard close to home and become an apple farmer himself. But he stayed connected to Boston, and the growing political strife there, by attending town meetings and participating in their protests. As a member of the Roxbury Militia, Alan Warren fought in the Battles of Lexington and Concord, and also at the Battle of Bunker Hill where he defended the Rail Fence with Captain Thomas Knowlton. Knowlton took notice of him and asked Alan to enlist in the new Continental Army as an officer in his company. But before he gave an answer, the British evacuated Boston. And when the American troops entered the city, Thomas Whaley, the father of a high society Bostonian girl Alan had fallen in love with, hunted him down. British soldiers had kidnapped his daughter Beatrice and taken her aboard General Howe's ship. If Alan could rescue her, Mr. Whaley would give him anything he asked–despite their previous political and economic differences. Alan Warren promised to bring her home, accepted the offer to join Knowlton's Rangers, but declined the commission, wanting as little responsibility as possible so he could leave to rescue Beatrice the first chance he got.

==== Captain Nathan Hale ====
Pious parents sent young Nathan Hale to Yale College at the age of 14, hoping he’d pursue the ministry. But at Yale he discovered he had a gift for the oratory, and when he graduated in 1773, became a school teacher instead. In New London, Connecticut, where he got a job as a school master, he held special early morning summer classes for women, believing they had as much right to an education as men. (The women were, perhaps, more interested in their handsome teacher, than in their teachings, despite the ugly scar a gunpowder burn had left on his forehead.) After fighting broke out in the neighboring Massachusetts Bay colony on April 19, 1775, Nathan, filled with a sense of patriotic duty, joined in the army as a first lieutenant. But to his dismay, his Connecticut company did not arrive in Boston until after the Battle of Bunker Hill, and for the next year Nathan had little to do while the Americans laid siege to Boston. Desperately seeking some action, he requested a transfer. Now a Captain, his request was granted, and he was transferred to an elite group known as Knowlton's Rangers. When some of the men in his company embarked on a mission to light fire to an American ship and send it sailing toward two large British warships on the Hudson River, Nathan alerted his new friend Alan Warren to use the spectacle as a diversion to get on board the Eagle–General Howe's personal ship–and rescue Beatrice Whaley.

==== Lt Colonel Thomas Knowlton ====
Thirty six years old, handsomely rugged, and a veteran of the French and Indian war, Thomas Knowlton fit the bill of an ideal officer in the Continental Army. After the battles of Lexington and Concord, Captain Knowlton and his company of 200 men from Connecticut were the first troops from his colony to arrive as reinforcements in Boston. When the Americans set out in the middle of the night to dig trenches at Charleston on Bunker Hill, Knowlton and his men participated. As the sun rose, better revealing their surroundings, it became obvious that the British could easily sweep around the American redoubt and attack from behind. To prevent this, Knowlton and his men built up defenses along a rail fence, connecting Breed's Hill to the Mystic River, cutting off any potential British flanking maneuvers. Knowlton's men were so successful at holding off their opponents that after the third attempt to storm the rail fence, General Howe was the only British officer still standing. Congress promoted him to Lieutenant Colonel, and put him in charge of a unique group of fighters called “Knowlton’s Rangers.” The Rangers would be entrusted with the most difficult reconnaissance missions, earning their nickname “Congress’s Own.”

==== Private Frederick Knowlton ====
When Captain Thomas Knowlton marched north for Boston with the 3rd Connecticut, he left his fifteen-year-old son at home. So rather than witness them himself, young Frederick Knowlton had to read about his father's heroic deeds at Bunker Hill and Charlestown in the papers. For the next year while Thomas Knowlton watched over his troops, Frederick watched over his mother, their farm, and his six younger siblings. But when General Howe and the British forces evacuated Boston, the Continental Army marched south. And on the way, Major Thomas Knowlton stopped at Ashford to visit his family, and to collect the then sixteen-year-old Freddy for service in the 20th Continental Regiment. His inconsolable wife barely relented, but ultimately the young man set off for New York City with his father to endure a long, hot summer digging trenches with the other privates. Used to being in charge after a year of managing his family's affairs, Frederick suddenly found himself the youngest man in his ranks. So he spent most of his summer avoiding the older men–whom he both revered and feared—and would often steal away to a quiet spot to write his mother a few lines about his day, but more importantly, to update her on his father. (The older Knowlton had been notorious for his silence while in Boston.) Her letters in return revealed a much less anxious mother than the one he had left behind. And sometimes Frederick would add things to his letters like, “And pa says…” though he had never said any such thing. But Frederick knew he was thinking it.

==== General William Howe ====
Sir William Howe was the youngest of three Howe brothers, all military men who served in the Seven Years' War. Howe was sent to America to aid General Gage in the fighting with the Americans, but after a horrible defeat at Bunker Hill (the British suffering 1,000 casualties), Gage was recalled from his position, sent back to Britain and replaced with Howe. The Americans kept Howe's army bottled up in Boston for nearly a year, and the city full of refugees came dangerously close to running out of food and supplies. When the Americans built defenses on Dorchester Heights, an advantageous position within firing range of the city, Howe chose to abandon the Boston to pick up the fight elsewhere. He brought his troops to New York City, where he met up with his brother, the Admiral of the Navy, Lord Richard Howe. Together, with their massively intimidating fleet of British warships, they sat circling Manhattan, waiting for the opportune time to start–and hopefully finish–the fight.

==== Mrs. Betsy Loring ====
Betsy Loring married into a prestigious family of British loyalists in Boston, but American Patriots raided her father-in-law's house in the country forcing the Lorings to flee for the city. The British Commander in Chief, General Gage, gave her father-in-law a generous appointment in the army to make up for the financial losses caused by the rebel mob. They settled into a home not far from the British headquarters, and from here Betsy noticed General William Howe who had just arrived from England. He shared her favorite vices–a fondness for wine, gambling, and pleasure. After just a few weeks she became his mistress, following him wherever the British forces moved, and, not one to miss a financial opportunity, her husband, Joseph Loring, followed them, too–to receive his hush money which he all too quickly gambled away.

== Awards ==
In 2008 The Dreamer was nominated for "Best Newcomer" in the Web Cartoonists' Choice Awards.

In 2008 The Dreamer was nominated "Best Adventure Comic", "Best Digital Art", and "Best Romantic Story" in the Drunk Duck Awards.

In 2008 The Dreamer was also nominated for "Best Backgrounds", "Best Tense Scenes", and "Best Traditional Art".

In 2009 The Dreamer won "Best Romance Comic" in the Drunk Duck awards.

In 2009, The Dreamer was also nominated for Best Backgrounds in the Drunk Duck awards.
