= Chuck Whelon =

British author and cartoonist

Chuck Whelon is a British, internationally published author and cartoonist, based in San Francisco, California, United States.

== Career ==
Chuck Whelon is the creator, artist and co-writer of the long-running humorous fantasy webcomic serial Pewfell, which originally appeared online on Modern Tales, and later became available for free on Webcomics Nation, DrunkDuck, and ComicFury.

Whelon has illustrated a series of search & find titles for Buster Books, including 'Where's the Penguin?', 'Where's Santa?' and 'The Great Fairy Tale Search', all of which have been translated into multiple languages.

He is the author and illustrator of a large variety of children's puzzle and activity books for Dover Publications, including the "What to Doodle?" series.

Whelon designed and illustrated the comic boardgame "Legitimacy" published by Minion Games. Whelon has also illustrated a number of other boardgames for Minion, including Those Pesky Humans, Grave Business, 'Tahiti', Nile, and Battle Merchants.

Since 2012 Whelon has written and drawn the monthly "Dr. Dig" comic strip for Cricket Media Group's 'Dig' magazine.

Whelon is the cartoonist for Goodman Game's 'Dungeon Crawl Classics' Role Playing Game.

Whelon has also worked as an Art Director for Ogilvy & Mather, an illustrator, Flash developer and production artist.

Whelon was born and raised in Basingstoke, England. He is a member of the National Cartoonists Society and the Society of Children's Book Writers and Illustrators. He is represented by the Beehive Illustration Agency.

He is the brother to Emily Jordan.

Whelon's current project is a crowd-funded puzzle book for kids called Wizard Pickles.

== RPG Game illustration credits ==
=== Interior artist ===
- 2004 - Dungeon Crawl Classics #13: Crypt of the Devil Lich
- 2004 - Dungeon Crawl Classics #4: Bloody Jack's Gold
- 2003 - New Glory Naval Base

=== Cover artist ===
- 2005 - Dungeon Crawl Classics #21: Assault on Stormbringer Castle
- 2004 - Dungeon Crawl Classics #14: Dungeon Interludes
- 2004 - Dungeon Crawl Classics #9: Dungeon Geomorphs
- 2004 - Dungeon Crawl Classics #7: The Secret of Smuggler's Cove
- 2004 - Dungeon Crawl Classics #5: Aerie Of The Crow God

=== Back cover artist ===
- 2004 - Dungeon Crawl Classics #4: Bloody Jack's Gold

=== Illustrator ===
- 2003 - Blood Tomb
