= Death Walks the Streets =

2010 comic book limited series

- Death Walks the Streets Issue #0; June 2008

Publication information
- Publisher: The Scream Factory
- Schedule: Monthly
- Format: Limited series
- Genre: Horror
- Publication date: June 2008 – present

Creative team
- Written by: James Zahn; Ben Brezinski
- Penciller(s): Guilherme Balbi; Mark Kidwell
- Inker(s): Alex Silva
- Letterer(s): Kurt Hathaway; Jason Moser
- Colorist(s): Javier Tartaglia; Milen Parvanov
- Editor(s): Troy Brownfield; Scott Licina; Janelle Siegel; David Pepose

Death Walks the Streets is a 2010 comic book limited series based on an unproduced screenplay for a film of the same title. The comic is a prequel, set three years prior to the timeline in the screenplay.

== Publication history ==
Death Walks the Streets was first released by The Scream Factory on June, 26 2008. Issue #0 was released in a standard, retail edition featuring a Werewolf cover, and a Wizard World Chicago 2008 convention exclusive, limited to 333 pieces. The Wizard World version was available at their Chicago event, which was held from June 26–29, 2008.

On October 10, 2008, news hit that Fangoria Comics had been reinstated and that Death Walks the Streets would continue under the Fangoria Graphix line, published by Fangoria.

Further news arrived on October 31, as release plans for both digital and print editions of the title were announced.

Due to continued internal restructuring of the Fangoria brand, Fangoria Graphix was once again shuttered in 2009 after releasing only one new issue of the Death Walks the Streets series.

On February 19, 2010, rumors began swirling that The Scream Factory had been reinstated after a cover for a new issue of Death Walks the Streets surfaced online bearing the company's trade dressing.

The return of The Scream Factory was confirmed on May 10, 2010, as Fearnet reported that the company had partnered with Panelfly to bring their comics into digital formats for the iPhone, iPad, and iPod Touch.

== Plot synopsis ==
Set three years before DWTS I, an Organization Soldier named Michael Labou leads a crew that includes his longtime friends Danielle and Malcolm. Charged with tracking down and capturing a person wanted by The Organization, it's anything but business as usual on the streets of New Marshall.

Vampires - Demons - Zombies - Werewolves - The Mob.

== Reception ==
Ain't it Cool News stated that the zero issue contained "a pretty good story" along with "a great premise." In regards to Issue #1 they said that "there's something beneath the surface and just off in the periphery that oozes evil and the anticipation for the big satanic hoof to drop is palpable" along with declaring that "DEATH WALKS THE STREETS is a welcome addition to a line of comics that does printed horror right."

Eric Anderson of The Pullbox called the series "smart horror at it's [sic] finest."

== Film adaptation ==
The comic book is a prequel to a possible film.

== Death Walks the Streets in popular culture ==
Napalm Death guitarist Mitch Harris can be seen wearing a Death Walks the Streets T-shirt in the music video for the song "On the Brink of Extinction" from the album Time Waits for No Slave.
