= Day by Day (webcomic) =

American webcomic by Chris Muir

- Author: Chris Muir
- Website: daybydaycartoon.com
- Current status/schedule: Daily
- Launch date: November 1, 2002
- Genre(s): Political, humor

Day by Day (also Day by Day Cartoon) is an American political webcomic by Chris Muir. The humor usually centers on four principal characters who had initially been presented as co-workers at an unspecified firm until the firm went out of business on December 25, 2007. Romantic relationships among the principals resulted in marriages and children, with one of the couples opening a small bar in the unnamed Texas Rio Grande Valley ranchland in which the strip is now principally set. These characters, their friends, and their families remain the strip's focus. The strip has a conservative libertarian viewpoint, and often makes reference to political weblogs. It was a Yahoo! Pick in the "Comics and Animation" category in 2004.

== Format and history ==
The strip is updated daily, including weekends. It usually follows a loose "strip story arc" throughout a given week. Except on Sundays, the strip is usually three colorized panels, comprising a combination of newly drawn art and a library of hand-drawn elements that Muir has digitized and reuses. As with many newspaper comics, the strips for Sundays are larger and have more panels. Muir has stated in interviews that by crafting the cartoons digitally, and using previously drawn faces, expressions, and body postures, he can react to breaking news by crafting a relevant comic and putting it up the next day, breaking or delaying the main storyline.

Generally, the strip features a running commentary on political events with the characters interacting in a vaguely seen office setting. In addition, the author often shows a "Doonesbury-esque" White House strip with an unseen President talking to his staff. Muir has often used the same treatment to show goings-on at the United Nations and The New York Times.

The home URL was written vertically on the leftmost edge of the strip, beginning on May 2, 2003, running until the site's redesign in 2006. The comic itself has run since November 1, 2002, with a hiatus from September 12, 2004, to November 30, 2004. The large-format Sunday strips started in 2005.

In 2007 the strip controversially portrayed Hillary Clinton in blackface and as speaking Ebonics.

== Financial model ==
Like many other web comics, Day by Day is supported by a combination of contributions from readers (via PayPal, Amazon and other payment vehicles), banner advertising, and merchandise. Originally it was published without the benefit of syndication. In 2005, the strip became available for print newspaper syndication and was carried by the Hemingford Ledger, the Knoxville News-Sentinel, the North County Times and The San Diego Union-Tribune. In October 2007, Day by Day discontinued service to newspapers. Also in October 2007, E-book compilations of Day by Day cartoons became available for free on WOWIO. It had a peak readership of more than 200,000 people a month.

== Characters ==
- Zedediah "Zed" Owens is a laconic, goateed product designer who is frequently worried that he may be over the hill. He was born in Gonzalez, Texas. It has been revealed that Zed is a former Special Operations sniper, who has since been recalled to duty in Iraq, where, as one strip revealed, he was actively hunting insurgents as a sniper once again. He proposed to Sam, and they married in Las Vegas. He currently resides in Texas.
- Samantha "Sam" Owens (formerly Samantha Flanagan) is a red-headed, cautious engineer, married to Zed. In 2006, it was revealed that her father is Irish and her mother (Kimiko Flanagan) is Japanese. She gave birth to twin daughters. Zed and Sam more often than not side with Damon, and both carry concealed handguns. Strips often center about the generational aspects between the forty-something Zed and Sam and the twenty-something Damon and Jan.
  - Caroline Kiko Owens and Catherine Mari Owens are Zed and Sam's twin daughters. Sam was recently pregnant again, but suffered a miscarriage possibly brought on by the shock of seeing a severely wounded Zed in the hospital.
- Damon Thomas is an African-American conservative and a self-taught programmer. He has explicitly stated in the past that he was orphaned in early childhood. He frequently accuses the Democratic Party as a whole of being racist. When his beachfront home was razed by the town (in a commentary on Kelo v. New London), he began living with, and is now married to, Jan. They have one son.
- Jan Portago is an ardent liberal marketing director, who does not seem to understand how Damon can be both black and conservative. At some point after Damon moved in with her after losing his house, they began a romantic relationship, and have since been married. Prior to the beginning of their romance, Jan secretly went out of her way to prevent him from leaving their company.
  - Javier Luciano Thomas is Damon and Jan's son.
- M. Luciano de la Portago y Verrillo is Jan's father and an entrepreneur. When Damon took offense at the politics of the company's majority shareholder, he, at Jan's request, persuaded them to sell their stock so that Damon would not resign.
- Skye Flanagan is Sam's younger sister, introduced to the strip in June 2006. She is as liberal as Jan, if not more so. Facially, she resembles Sam, but she has brown hair rather than Sam's flaming red hair, and has a number of piercings and tattoos. She is happy for Sam and Zed, despite the fact that he is "some conservative guy". She was romantically involved with Dmitri Anatoly, but they split after a short time. After Dimitri left, she discovered that she was pregnant.
- Dimitri Anatoly is a Russian asset rescued from Afghanistan by Zed and brought to the U.S. He and Skye were involved for a short time, but eventually split.
- Suzi Strom was a young intern who was openly attracted to Zed, despite the large age gap between them. (Zed did not reciprocate.) She left the company off-panel at some point in 2006. In the December 19th 2017 strip, Zed informs Sam that Suzi "went back to Sweden years ago, where she was raped to death by her new Muslim boyfriend."
- Naomi Rivka Levy is a private military contractor working in Iraq, who had previously served as Zed's spotter during his time as a sniper. It is revealed that Jan's father hired her to keep an eye on his daughter while she is in Iraq, but Jan's obvious and undisguised disdain of her and mercenaries in general complicates matters. She is Israeli, as Jan seems somewhat shocked to note.
- Lieutenant Markos Anderson is a U.S. Army Infantry Officer in Iraq whose platoon Jan is embedded with. He is dedicated and takes his work seriously, reprimanding his troops for ogling Jan on numerous occasions, but also demonstrates a wry sense of humor when Jan's preconceptions about Iraq and the American military are made known.

== Creator ==
The Day by Day strip is drawn by cartoonist Chris Muir (born October 30, 1958, in Syracuse, New York). Prior to that, he drew a single-panel comic called Altered States for about five years for Florida Today (a Gannett newspaper). Muir currently lives in Florida.

As to the strip's political viewpoint, Muir stated that he "wanted to present the point of view that I never see represented in what I call Old Media: the papers, magazines, TV (until Fox News), etc. Where's the voice of the other half, the moderate-conservative half of America, on ethics, economy, politics and the age-old dynamic betwixt men and women?" The strip is popular amongst conservative bloggers, and often mentions bloggers and blog posts. Muir cites the work of several other cartoonists as inspiration, including Gary Larson and Garry Trudeau.

In February 2007, Muir visited Iraq and was embedded for five days in Mosul.
