= Blatant Comics =

American comic book publisher

Blatant Comics is an independent American comic book publisher founded in 1997 by Chris Crosby with Randy Faucheux III and John Waupsh III (who later left to pursue other exploits). Blatant is known for publishing parody comic books such as Sloth Park, XXXena: Warrior Pornstar, and Dead Sonja: She-Zombie with a Sword, and humor comics like +EV and Impeach Bush!. On May 5, 2007, as part of Free Comic Book Day, Blatant ventured into less humorous subject matter with a straight horror comic called Last Blood.

Blatant's titles are distributed to comic book stores by Diamond Comic Distributors. Back issues are available through Mile High Comics.

== List of Blatant Comics titles ==
- +EV (2006, collection of the poker comic strip)
- Anger Grrrl (1999, parody of Danger Girl)
- Busty The Vampire Murderer (1998, parody of Buffy The Vampire Slayer)
- Dead Sonja: She Zombie with a Sword (2006, parody of Red Sonja)
- The EboniX-Files/The Ungrammatical EboniX-Men (1998 flipbook, parodies of The X-Files and X-Men)
- Gen 113 (1998, parody of Gen^{13})
- Impeach Bush! (2006, political graphic novel)
- Last Blood (2007, zombie/vampire horror comic)
- Phathom (1999, parody of Fathom)
- Sloth Park (1998, two issues, parody of South Park)
- When Beanies Attack (1999, parody of Beanie Babies toys)
- XXXena: Warrior Pornstar (1997–1999, five issues, parody of Xena: Warrior Princess)
- Marry Me (2007-June 2008, romantic comedy - 1 paperback issue so far. A graphic novel was released in July 2008.)

== Sales ==
- According to the Diamond Comic Distributors Top 300 charts Blatant's highest selling title to date is Sloth Park #1 (1998), which ranked #232 with estimated sales of 5,000 copies.
- The 2007 Free Comic Book Day issue Last Blood #1 had a circulation of "about 20,000 copies."

== Reviews ==
- Las Vegas Weekly reviewed Dead Sonja and Impeach Bush.
- Salon.com reviewed Last Blood #1.
