= Grey Legacy =

Science-Fiction webcomic

- Author(s): Wayne Wise, Fred Wheaton
- Website: Official website
- Launch date: October 29, 2007
- Genre(s): Comedy, Science fiction

Grey Legacy is a science fiction webcomic by Wayne Wise and Fred Wheaton that was originally published in print form. The comic is hosted on DrunkDuck. The comic was among the first ever to win a Xeric Award in 1992.

== Synopsis ==
Grey Legacy is about Greylock, a student at an interstellar academy, and his rise to fame. Roommate of Lesterfarr, Greylock meets alien Bilmar, who was captured by the university and who pretends to be mute and dumb in order to avoid attention. The three eventually team up in a series of interstellar adventures.

== Development ==
Throughout the 1980s, Wayne Wise and Fred Wheaton created Grey Legacy as a series of minicomics. The series was eventually published in print as an anthology in 1992 thanks to a grant by the Xeric Foundation. Grey legacy became one of the first four comics to win the Xeric Grant, but the comic series was unable to gain any more significant success throughout the 1990s.
