= Chris Crosby (comics) =

Co-founder of Keenspot and webcomics creator

- Born: September 15, 1977 (age 48)
- Occupations: CEO of Keenspot and comic writer
- Writing career
- Language: English
- Period: 1995–present
- Notable work: Superosity

Chris Crosby (born September 15, 1977) is a co-founder and the chief executive officer of Keenspot, a company providing a platform and network for webcomics. They are also a comics writer and artist, with works including Superosity, Sore Thumbs, and Snap The Punk Turtle.

== Early work ==
In an interview, Crosby said they had been interested in comics since before they were old enough to remember. They first published a webcomic in 1995 through their AOL account. They also self-published some issues of a comic called Snap The Punk Turtle, which they say got them attention at Wizard, leading to coverage and then a gig writing a webcomic for AnotherUniverse.com's Mania magazine. After Mania stopped running webcomics in 1998, Crosby decided to start their own daily webcomic, which would be Superosity.

Around this time, Crosby was one of the writers on a print comic book series called Scorn. Three issues were published by SCC Entertainment: Scorn: Deadly Rebellion #0 (July 1996), Scorn: Heatwave #1 (January 1997), and Scorn: Naked Truth #1 (April 1997). According to Diamond Comic Distributors' sales charts for January 1997, Scorn: Heatwave #1 sold an estimated 3,439 copies in that month.

== Superosity ==
An example of a Superosity strip from March 2021

Crosby is the writer and artist of Superosity, a daily comic that they launched on March 1, 1999. In a 2003 interview, Crosby described their comic as "a storyline-focused strip, packed with wacky insane humor... about the friendship between a group of unusual characters." The main character is also named Chris, who Crosby described as "an ever-optimistic, childlike guy who is not very smart and wears a big orange cape." Other characters include Boardy, a talking blue board who has amnesia but is a scientific genius, and Bobby, Chris's teenage brother, who hates everything and wants to be rich and famous. Bobby's best friend is a talking turtle named Snap, one of many characters brought over from earlier Crosby strips. The cast also features Arcadia, a young female lawyer who Chris is in love with.

According to a 2003 Comicon article, Superosity "has been called a cross between The Simpsons and Bloom County." According to Keenspot, Superosity was reviewed in Comics Buyer's Guide in late 2001, which said it "may be one of the most off-the-wall online comics", calling the humor "non-sequitur" and said "the art is cringe-worthy at first, but... improved with age." Superosity was nominated for a 2002 Cartoonist Choice Award in the Best Superhero Comic category.

Seven issues of a Superosity print comic book were published from 2001 to 2002 and distributed by Diamond Comic Distributors to comic book stores. It featured guest artwork by creators such as Jeffrey J. Rowland (Overcompensating) and John Allison (Scary Go Round). Superosity has also been published in newspapers, most notably The Turlock Journal of Turlock, CA. As of October 2020, Superosity is still updating daily.

=== Adaptation ===
On July 21, 2006, at San Diego Comic-Con it was announced that an animated TV series called 'Angelipups' would be produced, based on the fictional 'Angelipups' TV show that appears in Superosity. Angelipups are a group of winged, candy-colored puppies who live in the sky and are responsible for keeping clouds fluffy; the in-comic TV show combines surreal humor with moral and educational elements. Crosby had written the pilot script and was commissioned to write more episodes. It is unclear if this TV show was ever produced.

== Keenspot ==
Chris Crosby was a co-founder of Keenspot, an online comic network. They cofounded the business in March 2000 with Teri Crosby, Darren Bleuel, and Nate Stone. According to writer T Campbell, Crosby had previously been hosting their comic Superosity on a site called Big Panda. Big Panda had been facing problems and its founder Bryan McNett offered control of Big Panda to Crosby in exchange for a cut of profits. Crosby agreed, but no deal could be reached. Through the Big Panda mailing list, Crosby made contact with Darren Bleuel and together they designed "Big Panda but better". Together with Bleuel's partner Stone and Chris's mother Teri, they founded Keenspot. Crosby's Superosity was the first comic on Keenspot, due to McNett's decision to remove the comic from Big Panda with four days' notice.

Keenspot's founders wished to provide a steady place for readers to find webcomics, and to attract large advertisers and get them to sponsor Keenspot and its cartoonists, with the goal of every Keenspot cartoonist eventually making a living through such sponsorship. Keenspot also launched Keenspace in 2000, a free webhosting service for cartoonists. As of 2003, it was an online entertainment network in which Keenspot featured more than forty of the higher-quality comic strips and cartoons on the web and Keenspace hosted over 1,000 other cartoonists. In 2002, Keenspot had almost forty million page views per month and nearly two million unique visitors per month.

Chris Crosby, along with their mother Teri Crosby, bought out the other two co-founders in 2008. According to the Keenspot website as of October 2020, Chris Crosby is the Chief Executive Officer of Keenspot.

== Sore Thumbs ==
Crosby started writing the webcomic Sore Thumbs in collaboration with artist Owen Gieni in 2004. The main character, Cecania, is forced by her mother to work in a video game store, Sore Thumbs, which is run by her extremely-Republican brother Fairbanks, selling only safe, non-violent, non-suggestive video games. Other characters include Cecania's best friend, a former doctor named Harmony; Sawyer Kaden, a soldier who lost his penis in the second Gulf War; and bear named Gary Coleman.

Reviewing the comic for Sequential Tart in 2004, Rebecca Henely gave it 4 out of 10, saying that despite being left-wing like the strip, she found the comic dumb, saying that "[i]ts potshots at conservatives are both incredibly obvious and not particularly biting." She called the jokes "stale", the characters "uniformly unlikable", and the dialogue "awful". She praised the art, but overall called the comic "unintelligent, uncreative and worst of all — it's not very funny." Also in 2004, reviewer Wednesday White said the art was "serviceable" and the "story shows potential here and there", but criticized its "hamhanded dialogue", saying "[e]veryone speaks like they're being scored on how many references they make to their assigned passions." White felt that "Fairbanks, in particular, grates... he's a caricature of an exaggeration of a Republican's idea of a left-wing stereotype of a Republican". She felt the comic could develop, saying, "[g]iven time, the characters could go from extrusions of perceptions of stereotypes to cartoons.

It appears that the last update of Sore Thumbs, apart from using the site to posts ads, was in 2014.

== Other work ==
List of comics for which Chris Crosby was a contributor
| Work | Role | Year(s) | Notes |
|---|---|---|---|
| Snap The Punk Turtle | Sole creator | ~1995 | |
| Scorn | Co-writer | 1996–1997 | |
| comic published in AnotherUniverse.com's Mania magazine | Writer | 1995?–1998 | |
| Superosity | Sole creator | 1999–present | |
| Sore Thumbs | Writer | 2004–2014 | |
| Crow Scare | Co-creator and co-writer | 2004–2008 | |
| WICKEDPOWERED | Co-creator and co-writer | 2006–2008 | |
| Last Blood | Co-creator | 2006–2010 | A comic in which vampires seek to protect the last remaining humans – their food source – from the zombie apocalypse. The movie rights for Last Blood were optioned in 2008, but as of 2020 no movie has been produced. |
| Yang Gang | Writer | 2020 | Crosby supported Andrew Yang during his campaign for the 2020 presidential nomination and wrote the comic Yang Gang depicting a fictional superhero version of Yang in his quest for the nomination. |
| Scorn | Writer | 2023 | Reboot of '90s comic book. |

Chris Crosby co-founded the comic book publisher Blatant Comics in 1997.

As of 2013, Crosby was chief technical officer at Red Giant Entertainment. They appear to have still been with the company as recently as 2017.
