= Strangeland (film) =

1998 American horror film

- Theatrical release poster
- Directed by: John Pieplow
- Written by: Dee Snider
- Produced by: Larry Meistrich; David L. Bushell; Dee Snider
- Starring: Linda Cardellini; Kevin Gage; Elizabeth Peña; Brett Harrelson; Robert Englund; Dee Snider
- Cinematography: Goran Pavicevic
- Edited by: Jeff Kushner; Joe Woo, Jr.
- Music by: Anton Sanko
- Production companies: Shooting Gallery; Snider Than Thou Productions
- Distributed by: Raucous Releasing; Artisan Entertainment; Behaviour Communications
- Release date: October 2, 1998
- Running time: 87 minutes
- Country: United States
- Language: English
- Box office: $713,239

Strangeland is a 1998 American horror film written by Dee Snider and directed by John Pieplow. The film centers around a police detective trying to save his city, as well as his daughter, from an online predator who enjoys bringing "enlightenment" through ritual pain.

== Plot ==
Fifteen-year-old Genevieve Gage and her best friend Tiana Moore are typical high school students in Helverton, Colorado who spend their idle time chatting with strangers in chat rooms. After chatting with another apparent student who goes by the screen name of "Captain Howdy", Genevieve and Tiana decide to attend a party at Captain Howdy's house, which is a trap. When neither Genevieve nor Tiana returns home by the next morning, Genevieve's mother, Toni, alerts her husband, local cop Mike Gage. With the assistance of a younger cop named Steve Christian, Gage begins searching for Genevieve and Tiana. The case takes an unexpected turn when Tiana's car is pulled out of a lake with Tiana's tortured body inside and no sign of Genevieve.

Mike discovers that Captain Howdy is into "body art", including significant tattooing, piercing, branding, and scarification. But it is not until Mike's niece Angela Stravelli informs him of Genevieve's penchant for meeting strangers through the Internet that Mike gets his first lead. Meeting the Captain Howdy online, Mike attempts to get Captain Howdy to invite him to a party. Despite the plan going awry, he later figures out Captain Howdy's location and finds his torture chamber. There, Gage finds Genevieve naked and bound, with her mouth stitched shut, as well as five other teenagers who are in similar predicaments. After a brief struggle in which Captain Howdy gets shot, Mike arrests him and discovers his real name is Carlton Hendricks.

Mike thinks he has closed the case. But a year later, Hendricks is declared not guilty by reason of insanity and he is put in the Meistrich Psychiatric Institute, only to be released three years later. Doctors at the Meistrich Institute state that Hendricks, who has been diagnosed as a schizophrenic with a severe chemical imbalance, is okay as long as he is on his medication. So, Hendricks moves back to his old neighborhood. While taking his medicine, Hendricks is timid and apologetic about what he did, but the memories of what Hendricks did are still fresh in the minds of Helverton's residents. Many people are not happy about Hendricks's release, especially an activist group led by Jackson Roth and Catherine "Sunny" Macintosh.

One night, while Roth's teenage daughter, Kelly, is out, a fearful Roth jumps to the conclusion that Hendricks has taken her. Roth calls Catherine and several others and they kidnap Hendricks. During this, Hendricks accidentally drops his medicine bottle, and it is run over by a car. Roth and the group then beat Hendricks and hang him from a tree. As Roth, Catherine, and the others leave, it starts raining and the rope, which turns out to be weak, snaps, saving Hendricks's life. However, the near-death experience, something he had mentioned hoping to attain earlier on in the film, reverts him to being Captain Howdy, this time with revenge on his mind.

After recovering, Hendricks kills Roth's wife Madeline in front of Roth before knocking him unconscious and then kidnapping him. Hendricks also kidnaps Catherine before contacting Mike at the police station. After hanging up with Mike, Hendricks brutally tortures Roth and Catherine. The next day, Toni calls Mike and tells him that Genevieve is missing. When Mike gets home with Steve, Hendricks's face is on Toni's computer screen. Hendricks has Genevieve and her mouth is stitched shut again. Hendricks tortures Genevieve while Mike and Toni watch the screen. After Hendricks disconnects, Genevieve, Roth, Catherine and a few other victims are soon found alive, but brutally tortured, by officers responding to a call. That night, after leaving the torture scene, Mike tracks Hendricks back to the club Xibalba. After a long struggle, Hendricks stands ready to kill Mike with a large meat hook chained to the ceiling. However, Mike sinks the hook into Hendricks's back, slams Hendricks into a wall, and then uses the hook to lift Hendricks off the floor. After Hendricks taunts Mike, Mike pours a flammable liquid on Hendricks, and presumably kills Hendricks by setting him on fire.

== Cast ==
- Dee Snider as Carlton Hendricks / Captain Howdy
- Kevin Gage as Detective Mike Gage
- Elizabeth Peña as Toni Gage
- Brett Harrelson as Detective Steve Christianson
- Linda Cardellini as Genevieve Gage
- Robert Englund as Jackson "Jack" Roth
- Leslie Wing as Madeline Roth
- Amy Smart as Angela Stravelli
- Ivonne Coll as Rose Stravelli
- Tucker Smallwood as Captain Churchill Robbins / Fetish Man With Studded Hood
- Robert LaSardo as Matt Myers, Tow-Truck Driver
- J Cooch Lucchese as Xibalba Bouncer / Band Member of Bile
- Barbara Champion as Catherine "Sunny" MacIntosh
- Amal Rhoe as Tiana Moore

== Production ==
The film's conceptual basis has its roots in the fourth track on Twisted Sister's 1984 release Stay Hungry. The song, entitled "Horror-Teria (The Beginning): A) Captain Howdy B) Street Justice", tells the story of a sadistic child murderer named Captain Howdy who ultimately walks free on a technicality and is then avenged upon by an outraged mob of parents.

== Reception ==
On the review aggregator website Rotten Tomatoes, 7% of 14 critics' reviews are positive, with an average rating of 2.7/10.

During its box office run, it grossed $713,239, opening at 315 theaters in North America.

== Soundtrack ==
Dee Snider's Strangeland Original Motion Picture Soundtrack
No.	Title	Writer(s)	Producer(s)	Length
1.	"Inconclusion" (Dee Snider)	Dee Snider; Anton Sanko; Tristan Avakian	Anton Sanko	4:17
2.	"Breathe" (Sevendust)	Sevendust	Mark Mendoza; Jay Jay French	3:17
3.	"A Secret Place" (Megadeth)	Dave Mustaine		5:29
4.	"Where You Come From" (Pantera)	Vincent Abbott; Darrell Abbott; Rex Brown; Phillip Anselmo		5:11
5.	"P & V" (Anthrax)	Charlie Benante; Scott Ian; John Bush		3:14
6.	"Absent" (Snot)	Michael Doling; Sonny Mayo; John Fahnstock; Jamie Miller; Lynn Strait		4:52
7.	"Street Justice" (dayinthelife...)	Snider		3:50
8.	"Not Living" (Coal Chamber)	Bradley Dez Fafara; Miguel Rascon; Rayna Foss; Mike Cox	Jay Gordon; Josh Abraham	3:51
9.	"In League" (Bile)	Chris Liggio		5:10
10.	"Sweet Tooth" (Marilyn Manson)	Marilyn Manson; Gidget Gein; Madonna Wayne Gacy		5:02
11.	"Eye for an Eye" (Soulfly)	Max Cavalera	Ross Robinson	3:36
12.	"Serpent Boy" (Radio Edit) (Hed PE)	Jerrad Shain; Wes Geer		3:26
13.	"Fuck Off" (Kid Rock featuring Eminem)	Robert J. Ritchie; Matthew Shafer; Jason Krause; Eminem		4:05
14.	"Awake" (The Clay People)	Dan Neet; The Clay People		3:30
15.	"Marmalade" (System of a Down)	Daron Malakian; Shavo Odadjian; John Dolmayan; Serj Tankian		3:01
16.	"I'm the Man" (Nashville Pussy)	Blaine Cartwright		2:16
17.	"Captain Howdy" (Crisis)	Snider		3:41
18.	"Heroes Are Hard to Find" (Twisted Sister)	Snider; Bernie Tormé	Mendoza; French	5:01

== Comic ==
Dee Snider's Strangeland: Seven Sins is a 2007–2008 comic book limited series prequel to Strangeland. It was announced as a monthly four-issue limited series by Fangoria Comics. The first issue was released on August, 29 2007. Due to the sudden closing of Fangoria Comics, the remaining three issues went unreleased until the series was picked up by The Scream Factory in 2008.
