= The Scream Factory =

Comic book publisher

- Industry: Comics
- Founded: 2008
- Headquarters: Chicago
- Key people: Scott Licina (Executive Editor); Jason Moser (Production Manager); Troy Brownfield (Associate Editor); David Pepose (Assistant Editor)
- Website: The Scream Factory on Myspace

The Scream Factory is an American publisher of horror comics. Most, if not all titles published by The Scream Factory are film-related.

== Overview ==
Formally announced on April 7, 2008 speculation to The Scream Factory and its involved parties had been swirling around the internet for some time. Many of the first titles released by The Scream Factory were released or partially released by the short-lived Fangoria Comics which closed in September 2007. Not a traditional publisher, The Scream Factory is said to be "an alliance of film, music, literary and comic book professionals."

== Titles ==
- BUMP - A four-issue mini-series slated to be a film starring Tobin Bell Sean Patrick Flanery and Ashley Laurence
- Robert Kurtzman's Beneath The Valley of The Rage - A four-issue prequel to Robert Kurtzman's 2007 motion picture The Rage
- G.R.A.V.E. Grrrls: Destroyers of the Dead - A three-issue mini-series created by Scott Licina and Ken Wolak featuring cover art by Alex Ross
- Death Walks the Streets - A prequel series to the upcoming motion film Death Walks the Streets set to star actor/musician Christian Kane
- Dee Snider's Strangeland: Seven Sins - A four-issue prequel to Twisted Sister frontman Dee Snider's 1998 horror film Strangeland. Written by Dee's son Jesse Blaze Snider who appeared on the 2008 MTV series Rock the Cradle
- Demolition Zombies - A five-page short story by Brian Matus appearing as an insert in digital versions of The Scream Factory titles.

== Spin-offs ==
- BUMP - Hack/Slash crossover - Originally slated to be a one-shot released by Fangoria Comics, the story was later incorporated into the ongoing Hack/Slash series for Devil's Due Publishing appearing in issues #12 and #13. Written by BUMP creator Mark Kidwell and drawn by Hack/Slash creator Tim Seeley.

== Others ==
Scream Factory also inherited other properties:

- Mark Kidwell's Recluse - Originally slated to be released on October 31, 2007 by Fangoria Comics but likely to appear in another medium first.
- Shifter - Originally slated to be released as a four-issue mini-series through Fangoria Comics. Slated to be a motion picture starring Michael Madsen and is currently the focus of negotiations.
- The Fourth Horseman - Originally slated to be released as a four-issue mini-series through Fangoria Comics and Scream Factory don't currently have plans to develop this further.
