= Fangoria Comics =

Defunct American publishing company

- Company type: Subsidiary of Fangoria Entertainment
- Industry: Comics
- Founded: 2006, by Scott Licina for Tom DeFeo
- Headquarters: Chicago
- Key people: Tom DeFeo (CEO); Scott Licina (Executive editor)
- Products: The Fangoria Comics line
- Website: fangoriacomics.com

Fangoria Comics was an American publisher of horror comics, releasing issues solely in the year 2007. It was a distinct unit under the larger Fangoria Entertainment umbrella, which also included Fangoria Magazine, Fangoria TV, and Fangoria Radio.

== Planning ==
Announced at San Diego's Comic-Con International in 2006, Fangoria Comics officially launched in June 2007. Executive Editor Scott Licina touted the line at many conventions, demonstrating that the comics would use a mix of established and original concepts. Several of the books had tie-ins to pre-existing films or franchises, while others are wholly original.

== Titles ==
The first two titles, BUMP and Beneath the Valley of The Rage debuted in June 2007 and enjoyed strong reviews from sources like Newsarama and Ain't It Cool News. These were followed by The Fourth Horseman and Strangeland: Seven Sins.

Recluse was scheduled to debut on October 31, 2007, and Shifter on November 14. Additionally, a one-shot of BUMP Hack/Slash, a crossover with the Devil's Due Publishing title, was set for October 31. None were released.

== Closure, relaunch and reclosure ==
Two months and four days after their first title was published, Fangoria Comics was shut down. The blame went to its eleven months of delay and a lack of publicity, both presumably on the part of its parent company, Fangoria Entertainment. Bump, Shifter and Beneath the Valley of The Rage all had future issues finished and hope to publish them elsewhere.

Just six months later, The Creative Group, parent company of Fangoria Entertainment filed for Chapter 11 on March 21, 2008.

The majority of the titles were published online by The Scream Factory in 2007 and 2008.

In October 2008, it was announced that The Scream Factory and Fangoria Entertainment would work together again. Fangoria Entertainment reorganized in 2008, with Tom DeFeo and The Brooklyn Company taking over. One of the first actions of the new alignment was the activation of Fangoria Graphix, a new spin on the Fangoria Comics concept. Many key players and creators from the original incarnation of Fangoria Comics and The Scream Factory are involved, including: Scott Licina, Executive Editor; Troy Brownfield, Associate Editor; and James Zahn, New Media Development.

In January 2009, Fangoria Entertainment once again restructured. After spending much of 2008 and 2009 rebuilding the image of their main brand, Fangoria Graphix was neglected along with the now-defunct Fangoria Radio. The key players left Fangoria to regroup as The Scream Factory once more.
