= BUMP (comics) =

- Bump #1 (June 2007) by Mark Kidwell and Jay Fotos

Publication information
- Publisher: Fangoria Comics; The Scream Factory
- Schedule: Monthly
- Format: Limited series
- Genre: Horror
- Publication date: June – September 2007
- No. of issues: 4

Creative team
- Created by: Mark Kidwell
- Written by: Mark Kidwell
- Artist: Mark Kidwell
- Letterer: Jay Fotos
- Colorist: Jay Fotos

BUMP is a 2007 comic book limited series written and illustrated by Mark Kidwell with colors and letters by Jay Fotos.

== Publication history ==
BUMP was initially published as a monthly four-issue comic book limited series by Fangoria Comics. The first issue was published in June 2007.

BUMP was re-released by The Scream Factory in April 2008.

== Plot synopsis ==
Sheriff Lundy is called into action to solve the mystery of the unexplained forces at work on the Dill Farm. A supernatural tale of extreme horror, where even the confines of the grave aren’t able to contain the brutal spirit of serial killer Edgar Dill, and his legion of monstrous Treehuggers.

== Spin-offs ==
- BUMP-Hack/Slash Crossover - Originally slated to be a one-shot released by Fangoria Comics, the story was later incorporated into the ongoing Hack/Slash series for Devil's Due Publishing appearing in issues #12 and #13. Written by BUMP creator Mark Kidwell and drawn by Hack/Slash creator Tim Seeley.
