= The Rage (2007 film) =

- The Rage theatrical poster
- Directed by: Robert Kurtzman
- Written by: John Bisson; Robert Kurtzman
- Produced by: John Bisson; Matt Jerrams; Anne Kurtzman; Gary Jones
- Starring: Andrew Divoff; Erin Brown
- Cinematography: Robert Kurtzman
- Edited by: Andrew Sagar
- Music by: Edward Douglas (Midnight Syndicate)
- Distributed by: Screen Media Films
- Release dates: July 13, 2007 (Fantasia Festival); February 26, 2008 (United States)
- Running time: 86 minutes
- Country: United States
- Language: English

The Rage is a 2007 horror film about a mad scientist who injects people with a rage virus in his laboratory in the woods.

The film stars Andrew Divoff and Erin Brown and was directed by Robert Kurtzman. It was first shown at the Fantasia Festival in Canada on July 13, 2007 and released on DVD by the independent company Screen Media Films on February 26, 2008.

The entire film is filmed in and around the town of Crestline, Ohio in the United States.

The music videos for Mushroomhead's "12 Hundred" and "Damage Done" were filmed on the set, and are featured in the film's DVD.

== Plot ==
A mad scientist named Dr. Viktor Vasilienko (Andrew Divoff) is disillusioned with capitalist society and creates a virus that is designed to make people rage with anger. In his hidden laboratory in the woods, he begins testing the virus on innocents. His experiments don't go as planned and his infected victims escape into the wilderness. There, the infection spreads as vultures eat the remains of the test subjects and become out of control with the compulsion to eat human flesh. Five friends, Pris (Sean Serino), her boyfriend Jay (Anthony Clark) and their friends Kat (Erin Brown), Josh (Ryan Hooks) and Olivia (Rachel Scheer) become involved when their RV is attacked by the vultures in the forest.

== Cast ==
Actor	Role
Andrew Divoff	Dr. Viktor Vasilienko
Erin Brown	Kat
Reggie Bannister	Uncle Ben
Ryan Hooks	Josh
Rachel Scheer	Olivia
Sean Serino	Pris
Anthony Clark	Jay
Keith Herrick	Misfit/Dave
Alan Tuskes	Gor
Christopher Allen Nelson	Chris
Steve Felton	Skinny
Jeffrey Hetrick	Jeffrey Nothing
Waylon Reavis	Waylon
Dave Felton	Gravy
Jack Kilcoyne	Pig Benis
Tom Schmitz	Shmotz
Rick Thomas	Stitch

== Beneath the Valley of The Rage ==
Beneath the Valley of The Rage is a 2007-2008 comic book limited series prequel to The Rage. Beneath the Valley of The Rage was initially published as a monthly four-issue limited series by Fangoria Comics. The first issue was published in June 2007. The series saw three of the four planned issues released prior to Fangoria Comics sudden closing.

Beneath the Valley of The Rage was re-released by The Scream Factory in April 2008 in its complete four-issue format, allowing readers to complete the series for the first time.
