= Keenspot =

Webcomics hosting service

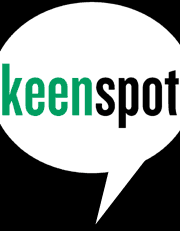
- Logo of Keenspot
- Owners: Chris Crosby, Teri Crosby
- Website: www.keenspot.com
- Launched: March 2000; 26 years ago

Keenspot is a webcomics/webtoons portal founded in March 2000 by cartoonist Chris Crosby (author of Superosity), Crosby's mother Teri, cartoonist Darren Bleuel (author of Nukees), and Nathan Stone.

As of 2016, Keenspot.com was the exclusive webcomics home of Twokinds, Brawl in the Family, the Luther Strode saga, Marry Me, Last Blood, Fall Out Boy Presents Fall Out Toy Works, Flipside, and dozens of other features.

In December 2016, Keenspot began publishing a new line of print comic book titles distributed to comic book stores by Diamond Comic Distributors, Inc. Their launch titles included monthly ongoings of Hunters of Salamanstra and Marry Me and book collections of Thomas Fischbach's Twokinds. Keenspot books are now distributed by Simon & Schuster.

== History ==
The formation of Keenspot was triggered by the collapse of an earlier webcomic portal, Big Panda.

Following the portal's creation in March 2000, Keenspot was serving over 23 million page views monthly by February 2001 and had 47 cartoonists. Also in June 2000 they had launched the free comics web hosting service Keenspace (later renamed Comic Genesis). In 2001 Keenspot launched its own printed comic book line and launched graphic novel collections in 2002 both at San Diego Comic-Con. By August in 2002, Keenspot opened a retail store, selling brandname toys and comics; Keenspot had 50 million views monthly and 600 paying members – who can read the comics without ads – and had published 26 titles.

Keenspot gross revenues grew from $103,976 in 2002 to $188,475 in 2003 with the number of pageviews largely unchanged from mid-2001. As of October 2007 it claimed to be home to more than 50 comics covering several genres and artistic styles.

In 2008, Bleuel and Stone sold their 50% stake in Keenspot to Crosby Comics, leaving Chris and Teri Crosby as the sole owners. Daniel "Dan" Shive, writer-illustrator of the webcomic/webtoon series EGS, which at the time was hosted on Keenspot, was named Chief Technical Officer (CTO).

As of September 2017 the site hosts 57 comics, of which eight are described as "updating with new comics regularly" and the rest of which are "completed or update infrequently".

== Impact and policies ==
One of Keenspot's notable traits is that it has been a starting point and supporter of many webcartoonists over the years. More than a dozen comics originally and currently hosted at Keenspot have branched out to become substantial full-time jobs for their creators.

The company says that it keeps exclusive web publishing rights to its comics, including archives, but that other rights are left with the creators. Side projects, particularly merchandising deals, are covered separately. Keenspot Entertainment is based in Cresbard, South Dakota.

The majority of titles published by Keenspot have been distributed to comic book stores worldwide by Diamond Comic Distributors. Keenspot has also launched two podcasts, a cartoon podcast, called Keentoons Video Podcast Network and an audio podcast called Keencast. Until 2006, Keenspot published the Keenspot Comics Page in collaboration with the Turlock Journal and several other small newspapers.

== See also ==
- Sluggy Freelance – Long-running webcomic by Pete Abrams
