= 2020 Ubisoft sexual misconduct litigation and accusations =

Ubisoft logo

From June to July 2020, a wave of sexual misconduct accusations occurred through the video game industry as part of the ongoing #MeToo Movement, including some of Ubisoft's employees. Ashraf Ismail, the creative director of Assassin's Creed Valhalla, stepped down to deal with personal issues related to allegations made towards him; his employment was later terminated by Ubisoft in August 2020 after internal investigations. Ubisoft announced two executives who were also accused of misconduct had been placed on leave, and that they were performing an internal review of other accusations and their own policies. Yves Guillemot stated on 2 July 2020 that he had appointed Lidwine Sauer as their head of workplace culture who is "empowered to examine all aspects of our company's culture and to suggest comprehensive changes that will benefit all of us", in addition to other internal and external programs to deal with ongoing issues that may have contributed to these problems. Specific accusations were made at Ubisoft Toronto where the studio co-founder Maxime Béland, also the vice president of editorial for Ubisoft as a whole, was forced to resign by Ubisoft's management due to sexual misconduct issues and led some employees working there to express strong concerns that "The way the studio—HR and management—disregards complaints just enables this behavior from men." Tommy François, the vice president of editorial and creative services, had been placed on disciplinary leave around July and by August, Ubisoft announced his departure from the company.

== Investigations ==
Spurred by these claims, the newspaper Libération had begun a deeper investigation into the workplace culture at Ubisoft. The paper ran a 2-part report printed on 1 and 10 July 2020 that claimed that Ubisoft had a toxic workplace culture. A component of that workplace was from accusations related to Serge Hascoët. The issues identified by Libération and corroborated by employees from other studios suggested that some of these problems had extended from the human resource heads of the company ignoring complaints made against Hascoët, using sexual misconduct and harassment to intimidate those who criticized him, on the basis that the creative leads were producing valuable products for the company. On 11 July 2020, the company issued a press release, announcing departures which include the voluntary resignations of Hascoët, Yannis Mallat, the managing director of Ubisoft's Canadian studios, and Cécile Cornet, the company's global head of human resources. Yves Guillemot temporarily filled in Hascoët's former role.

A following report from Bloomberg News by Jason Schreier corroborated these details, with employees of Ubisoft's main Paris headquarters comparing it to a fraternity house. Schreier had found that the issues with Hascoët had gone back years and had affected the creative development on the Assassin's Creed series and other products as to avoid the use of female protagonists. Ubisoft had already been criticized for failing to support female player models in Assassin's Creed Unity or in Far Cry 4, which the company claimed was due to difficulty in animating female characters despite having done this in earlier games. Ubisoft employees, in Schreier's report, said that in the following Assassin's Creed games which did feature female protagonists at release, including Assassin's Creed Syndicate and Assassin's Creed Origins, there were serious considerations of removing or downplaying the female leads from the editorial department. This was due to a belief that Hascoët had set in the department that female characters did not sell video games. Further, because of Hascoët's clout in the company, the developers would have to make compromises to meet Hascoët's expectations, such as the inclusion of a strong male character if they had included female leads or if they had used cutscenes, a narrative concept Hascoët reportedly did not like. Hascoët's behavior among other content decisions made by Hascoët had "appeared to affect" the quality of Ubisoft's games by 2019; both Tom Clancy's The Division 2 and Tom Clancy's Ghost Recon Breakpoint "underperformed", which gave Ubisoft justification to diminish Hascoët's oversight with the aforementioned January 2020 changes in the editorial department and gave its members more autonomy. There remained questions as to what degree CEO Yves Guillemot knew of these issues prior to their public reporting; employees reported that Hascoët has been very close with the Guillemot brothers since the founding of the editorial department around 2001 and that some of the prior complaints of sexual misconduct had been reported directly to Yves and were dismissed. Gamasutra also spoke to some former and current Ubisoft employees during this period from its worldwide studios, corroborating that these issues appears to replicate across multiple studios, stemming from Ubisoft's main management.

Ubisoft had a shareholders' meeting on 22 July 2020 addressing these more recent issues. Changes in the wake of the departures included a reorganization of both the editorial team and the human resources team. Two positions, Head of Workplace Culture and Head of Diversity and Inclusion, would be created to oversee the safety and morale of employees going forward. To encourage this, Ubisoft said it would tie the performance bonus of team leaders to how well they "create a positive and inclusive workplace environment" so that these changes are propagated throughout the company. Ahead of a September 2020 "Ubisoft Forward" media presentation, Yves Guillemot issued a formal apology for the company on their lack of responsibility in the matters prior to these events. Guillemot said,

This summer, we learned that certain Ubisoft employees did not uphold our company's values, and that our system failed to protect the victims of their behavior. I am truly sorry to everyone who was hurt. We have taken significant steps to remove or sanction those who violated our values and code of conduct, and we are working hard to improve our systems and processes. We are also focused on improving diversity and inclusivity at all levels of the company. For example, we will invest $1 million over the next five years in our graduate program. The focus will be on creating opportunities for under-represented groups, including women and people of color.

Guillemot sent out a company-wide letter in October 2020 summarizing their investigation, finding that nearly 25% of the employees had experienced or witnessed misconduct in the last 2 years, and that the company was implementing a 4-point plan to correct these problems, with a focus to "guarantee a working environment where everyone feels respected and safe". The company hired Raashi Sikka, Uber's former head of diversity and inclusion in Europe and Asia, as vice president of global diversity and inclusion for Ubisoft in December 2020 to follow on to this commitment.

In September 2020 Michel Ancel left Ubisoft and the games industry to work on a wildlife preserve, stating that his project Beyond Good & Evil 2 at Ubisoft and Wild as Wild Sheep Studio was left in good hands before he left. As part of their coverage from the sexual misconduct issues, Libération found that Ancel's attention towards Beyond Good & Evil 2 to be haphazard, which had resulted in delays and restarts since the game's first announcement in 2010. The team considered Ancel's management style to be abusive, having dismissed some of their work and forcing them to restart on development pathways. While the team at Ubisoft Montpellier had reported on Ancel's lack of organization and leadership on the project to management as early as 2017, Libération claimed it was his close relationship with Yves Guillemot that allowed the situation to continue until 2020 when a more in-depth review of all management was performed in wake of the sexual misconduct allegations. Ancel stated he was not aware of the issues from the team and asserts his departure was stress related. In November 2020, Hugues Ricour, the managing director of Ubisoft Singapore, stepped down from that role after these internal reviews and remained with the company.

The French trade union Solidaires Informatique initiated a class action lawsuit against Ubisoft in relation to the allegations; Solidaires Informatique had previously represented workers in a case of workplace concerns at French developer Quantic Dream. At the trial in May 2021, Le Télégramme reported that very little had changed within the company, as many of the HR staff that were part of the problem remained in their positions within the company, both in its France headquarters and its Canadian divisions. Employees reported to the newspaper that nothing had changed despite the new guidelines. In response to this report, Ubisoft stated that "Over a period of several months, Ubisoft has implemented major changes across its organization, internal processes and procedures in order to guarantee a safe, inclusive and respectful working environment for all team members." and "These concrete actions demonstrate the profound changes that have taken place at every level of the company. Additional initiatives are underway and are being rolled out over the coming months."

== Later developments ==
Solidaires Informatique and two former Ubisoft employees filed a second lawsuit within the French courts in July 2021. As translated by Kotaku, the complaint states that Ubisoft "as a legal entity for institutional sexual harassment for setting up, maintaining and reinforcing a system where sexual harassment is tolerated because it is more profitable for the company to keep harassers in place than to protect its employees". The complaint names some of those identified during the initial 2020 accusations, including Hascoët, François, and Cornet, as directly responsible for maintaining conditions that promoted the harassment.

In July 2021, Activision Blizzard was sued by the California Department of Fair Employment and Housing (DFEH) on accusations the company maintained a hostile workplace towards women and discriminated against women in hiring and promotions. Among other reactions, this led to the Activision Blizzard employees staging a walkout on 28 July 2021 to protest the management's dismissive response to the lawsuit. About 500 employees across Ubisoft signed a letter in solidarity with the Activision Blizzard employees, stating that "It should no longer be a surprise to anyone: employees, executives, journalists, or fans that these heinous acts are going on. It is time to stop being shocked. We must demand real steps be taken to prevent them. Those responsible must be held accountable for their actions." Ubisoft CEO Yves Guillemot sent a letter to all Ubisoft employees in response to this open letter, stating "We have heard clearly from this letter that not everyone is confident in the processes that have been put in place to manage misconduct reports" and that "We have made important progress over the past year". This reply prompted another open letter from Ubisoft employees that derided Guillemot's response in that "Ubisoft continues to protect and promote known offenders and their allies. We see management continuing to avoid this issue", and that the company had generally ignored issues that employees have brought up. The employees' response included three demands of Ubisoft management, ending the cycle of simply rotating the troublesome executives and managers between studios to avoid issues, for the employees to have a collective seat in ongoing discussions to improve the workplace situation, and establishing cross-industry collaboration for how to handle future offenses that includes non-management employees as well as union representatives.

In August 2021, a group of Ubisoft employees formed a workers' rights group, A Better Ubisoft, to seek more commitment and action from the company in response to the allegation from the past year. The group asked to have a seat at the table to discuss how the company was handling changes and improvements to avoid having these problems come up in the future. Axios reported in December 2021 that there was an "exodus" of Ubisoft employees leaving the company due to a combination to lower pay and the impact of the workplace misconduct allegation.

Ubisoft Singapore began to be investigated by Singapore's Tripartite Alliance for Fair and Progressive Employment Practices in August 2021 based on reports of sexual harassment and workplace discrimination within that studio, following a July 2021 report published by Kotaku.

In June 2025, trials began in Bobigny Criminal Court for Tommy François, Serge Hascoët, and Guillaume Patrux over allegations of "moral and sexual harassment". François engaged in sexual misconduct and psychological harassment. Hascoët subjected employees to racial slurs and Islamophobic pranks. Patrux bullied and harassed others by violence and setting a colleague's beard on fire.

In July 2025, all three were convicted and received suspended sentences and ordered to pay fines. François received a three year sentence and ordered to pay €30,000, Hascoët 18 month sentence and €40,000, and Patrux 12 month sentence and €10,000. Ubisoft's CEO, Yves Guillemot, has been subpoenaed to the court to answer questions related to the charges on October 1, 2025.
