= Jade (Beyond Good & Evil) =

- Beyond Good & Evil character
- Jade as she appears in Beyond Good & Evil
- First game: Beyond Good & Evil (2003)
- Created by: Michel Ancel
- Voiced by: Jodi Forrest; Courtney Mae-Briggs (Captain Laserhawk: A Blood Dragon Remix)

Jade is a fictional character and the protagonist of the action-adventure video game Beyond Good & Evil. She is a photo-journalist, and was created by Ubisoft developer Michel Ancel, with the goal of creating a character resembling a real person, rather than a "sexy action woman". In Beyond Good & Evil, Jade and Uncle Pey'j, a half-pig half-human, work together to rescue orphans they were taking care of and expose governmental corruption. Jade returns in the adult animated series Captain Laserhawk: A Blood Dragon Remix, voiced by Courtney Mae-Briggs.

Since appearing in Beyond Good & Evil, Jade has been met with a very positive reception and has been included on several lists of top female video game characters. She has been compared to other such characters, including Alyx Vance from Half-Life 2.

== Concept and creation ==
Jade was created by Beyond Good & Evil developer Michel Ancel, whose wife, Alexandra, a character artist for the game, played an important role in her creation. Beyond Good & Evil public relations manager Tyrone Miller stated that a rumor existed that she was the inspiration for Jade. Ancel set about creating a character that resembled a real person rather than a "sexy action woman", and Miller points out that the focus on Jade is on her role, situation, and the meaning of her actions in the game. Miller also describes her as a "girl next door" that people can identify with.

The design of Jade evolved throughout the game's development, both in terms of her appearance and psychology. IGN editor Kaiser Hwang describes the change as going from an innocent girl with a tomboyish charm to a tougher, more weathered girl with multiple green-colored articles of clothing. While Jade has been cited as a black character, Miller states that she has no established ethnicity, since the game takes place on another planet.

She was voiced by Jodi Forrest in the English version of the first game, Emma De Caunes in French, Beatriz Berciano in Spanish, Shandra Schadt in German, and Chiara Colizzi in Italian. When asked who he felt should portray Jade in a hypothetical Beyond Good & Evil film, Miller chose Shannyn Sossamon, stating that she looks and walks similarly to Jade. In an interview with Nintendo Power, Ancel stated that he hopes Jade maintains her values and personality in Beyond Good and Evil 2. In an interview with Play, Ancel described Jade as having "a soul like a real person" rather than simply a puppet for the players to control. He noted the character's design was adapted during production, and attributed her personality to the game's dialogue, voice acting, and visuals "coming together".

== Appearances ==
In Beyond Good and Evil, Jade lives in an island lighthouse with the boar-like Pey'j, caring for children orphaned by attacks on the planet by the DomZ, an aggressive alien race. While a skilled jōdō martial artist, she is also a freelance journalist. When she runs out of money to power the lighthouse's shield generator, Jade takes a photography job cataloging all the animals on Hillys. She is then recruited by the IRIS Network, an anti-government resistance movement trying to expose a collaboration between the DomZ and Alpha Sections, an elite military group supposedly created to fight the DomZ. With her martial arts knowledge, she is able to infiltrate various government facilities and obtain evidence of human trafficking. After confronting the DomZ High Priest on Hillys' moon, she learns that she is known to the DomZ as "Shauni" (incidentally also her IRIS Network codename), and was bequeathed with a spiritual power stolen from them centuries ago. She subsequently uses that power to defeat the Priest and save the Hillyan populace. She also appears in Astro Bot as a cameo.

A Jade-like figure appears in a Beyond Good and Evil 2 teaser trailer, traveling with Pey'j. The same figure is also shown in a leaked development video from Ubisoft, escaping from a city. In addition, Jade's costume appears in the 2008 video game Prince of Persia for the character Elika. A reimagined version of Jade appeared in the 2023 adult animated series Captain Laserhawk: A Blood Dragon Remix, voiced by Courtney Mae-Briggs.

== Reception ==
Since her appearance in Beyond Good & Evil, Jade has been met with a positive reception, particularly for being attractive yet also tasteful. Fox News editor Lou Kesten cited Jade as an example of a heroine who isn't just eye candy for adolescent boys. IGN listed her as one of the top ten gaming heroines, describing her as "not your typical game character", and arguing that she is inquisitive, smart, brave, and fully clothed. IGN editor David Adams praised her ability to register pity or horror with the subtlest of changes in expression.

GamesRadar staff included Jade in multiple character lists, including their 2018 list of the best heroic characters in video games where she is ranked 28th place. Play featured her in their first annual "Girls of Gaming" issue, praising her as the "ultimate thinking man's (and woman's) heroine." GameDaily listed her as one of the top 25 hottest game babes, citing her as both tough and fashionable. They also listed her as one of the "10 babes who should meet your mom," for being as "devoted," and listed her in their "Babes of the Week: Brunettes" article, stating that she has a heart of gold. UGO.com listed her as the 46th hottest game babe, calling her "righteous." San Francisco Chronicle editor Peter Hartlaub listed her as one of the top nine greatest video game heroines, describing her as tomboyish and a regular girl caught in the middle of a conflict. In 2013, Complex ranked her as the eight greatest heroine in video game history, and during a PAX Prime panel for game developers and journalists, Jade took top spot for best female character in an action game. 1UP.com also cited Jade favorably, stating that "her down to earth demeanor, athleticism, and adventurous spirit make Jade a capable character suited to any task in Beyond Good & Evil's dark political story." Entertainment Weekly's Darren Franich listed her as one of "15 Kick-Ass Women in Videogames", describing her as "a badass female main character."

Jade has also been compared to other characters in video games. GamePro cited her as an example of the right way to do female video game characters, along with other female protagonists such as Portal's Chell, Half-Life 2's Alyx Vance, and Silent Hill 3's Heather Mason. Kotaku editor Stephen Totillo compared her to Kendra Midori, protagonist of the Avatar video game, describing Midori as a "nature-loving scientist lady" while describing Jade as a "nature-loving photographer," stating that she would feel at home in the world of Avatar. Anita Sarkeesian highlighted Jade as an example of a positive portrayal of women in video games, noting her presentation as an "active, practical, young woman of color who has a job to do". In an article discussing racial ambiguity in video games, Wired editor Chris Kohler uses Jade as an example of someone whose race is ambiguous, also bringing up a reader's blog post listing Jade in his list of black characters. This caused a "mini-controversy" on the NeoGAF forums, from which Kohler took statements as evidence of the ambiguity. He feels that the developers made Jade racially ambiguous, intending to allow players to see themselves in her.
