= Captain Laserhawk: A Blood Dragon Remix =

2023 television series

- Promotional poster
- Genre: Science fiction
- Created by: Adi Shankar
- Inspired by: Far Cry 3: Blood Dragon by Ubisoft
- Showrunner: Adi Shankar
- Written by: Alex Larsen; Samuel Laskey; Craig Coyne
- Story by: Adi Shankar
- Directed by: Mehdi Leffad
- Creative director: Balak
- Voices of: Nathaniel Curtis; Caroline Ford; Balak; Boris Hiestand; David Menkin; Mark Ebulue; Nigel Barber; Adi Shankar; Courtney-Mae Briggs; Glenn Wrage
- Composer: Oscillian
- Countries of origin: France; United States
- Original language: English
- No. of episodes: 6

Production
- Executive producers: Adi Shankar; Gérard Guillemot; Hélène Juguet; Hugo Revon
- Producers: Gérard Guillemot; Hélène Juguet; Hugo Revon
- Editors: Alric Decroux; Mathilde Wasilewski
- Running time: 20–25 minutes
- Production companies: Ubisoft Film & Television; Bobbypills; Bootleg Universe; Netflix Animation Studios

Original release
- Network: Netflix
- Release: October 19, 2023

Captain Laserhawk: A Blood Dragon Remix is an adult animated science fiction television series created by Adi Shankar for Netflix. It is inspired by the 2013 video game Far Cry 3: Blood Dragon, while amalgamating elements and characters from several other Ubisoft franchises. Produced by Ubisoft Film & Television, Bobbypills, and Bootleg Universe, the series was released on October 19, 2023, on Netflix and received generally positive reviews from critics.

The series is an alternate history, set in a version of the United States during 1992. The country has become a dystopian technocracy under the exclusive control of the corporation Eden. The corporation has created anthropomorphic animals which serve as its main source of slave labor. A supersoldier who defected from the ranks of the company's army has been incarcerated in a black site prison. He and several other prisoners are coerced into serving as a black ops team, thanks to implants that will kill them if they refuse to follow orders. Their primary goal is to undermine the plots of a revolutionary who happens to be the main character's treasonous ex-boyfriend.

== Premise ==
The series is set in 1992, in an alternate history in which the United States has become Eden, a dystopian technocracy controlled by the megacorporation of the same name and populated by humans and artificially created anthropomorphic animals called "Hybrids", who are treated by humans as slaves, livestock and beasts of burden. Dolph Laserhawk, a supersoldier modified by Eden Tech Military, escapes and becomes a fugitive alongside his boyfriend Alex Taylor. During a final heist, Taylor betrays Laserhawk, who is captured and incarcerated in Eden's black site prison, Supermaxx.

Under the direction of Supermaxx's warden, who has implanted an explosive device inside him, Laserhawk is selected to lead a team of other captive rebels, known as the Ghosts, on a series of covert operations to undermine Taylor's plans.

== Voice cast and characters ==
- Captain Dolph Laserhawk

Voiced by: Nathaniel Curtis
A fugitive supersoldier and leader of the Ghosts.

- Sarah Fisher / Sigma ("Σ")

Voiced by: Caroline Ford
The warden of the Supermaxx prison, who gives the Ghosts their orders. Based on the character of the same name from the Splinter Cell franchise.

- Bullfrog

Voiced by: Balak
A frog hybrid and French assassin who is recruited to the Ghosts. Inspired by the assassins of the Assassin's Creed franchise.

- Alex Taylor

Voiced by: Boris Hiestand
An anti-Eden revolutionary and Dolph's ex-boyfriend, who becomes his enemy after betraying him during a heist. Based on the character of the same name from The Crew.

- Rayman / Ramon

Voiced by: David Menkin
An alien from the parallel world of Dimension X who becomes an Eden newscaster and media personality. Based on the eponymous character from the franchise of the same name.

- Marcus Holloway

Voiced by: Mark Ebulue
The leader of the anti-Eden resistance movement DedSec. Based on the character of the same name from Watch Dogs 2.

- Sam Fisher

Voiced by: Nigel Barber
A former United States soldier and Sarah's father. Based on the character of the same name from the Splinter Cell franchise.

- Red

Voiced by: Adi Shankar
The leader of the Niji 6, a team of Power Rangers-inspired superheroes that serve Eden. Inspired by the operators of Rainbow Six Siege.

- Jade

Voiced by: Courtney-Mae Briggs
A photojournalist who is recruited to the Ghosts. Based on the character of the same name from Beyond Good & Evil.

- Pey'j

Voiced by: Glenn Wrage
A pig hybrid and Jade's adoptive uncle who is recruited to the Ghosts. Based on the character of the same name from Beyond Good & Evil.

- Pagan Min

Voiced by: Daniel York Loh
A crime lord in Eden. Based on the character of the same name from Far Cry 4.

- Kenny Omega

Voiced by: Himself
A professional wrestler for the Eden Wrestling Federation. Based on Omega's likeness as an AEW wrestler.

- Cody Rhodes

Voiced by: Himself
A professional wrestler for the Eden Wrestling Federation who is recruited to the Ghosts. Based on Rhodes' likeness as a WWE superstar.

== Episodes ==
No. in season	Title	Written by	Original release date
1	"Episode 1"	Teleplay by : Alex Larsen	October 19, 2023
2	"Episode 2"	Teleplay by : Samuel Laskey	October 19, 2023
3	"Episode 3"	Teleplay by : Samuel Laskey	October 19, 2023
4	"Episode 4"	Teleplay by : Alex Larsen	October 19, 2023
5	"Episode 5"	Teleplay by : Craig Coyne	October 19, 2023
6	"Episode 6"	Teleplay by : Alex Larsen	October 19, 2023

== Production ==
The show was first unveiled by Ubisoft in October 2019, by its former title Captain Laserhawk: A Blood Dragon Vibe, with Castlevania executive producer Adi Shankar helming the project, although no distributor was announced. In June 2021, during Netflix's "Geeked Week" virtual event, Shankar revealed that he is producing the series based on the vibe of Far Cry 3: Blood Dragon under the title Captain Laserhawk: A Blood Dragon Remix. The show is being helmed by Shankar with Paris-based animation studio Bobbypills handling the production. Balak serves as creative director with Mehdi Leffad as director. Gérard Guillemot, Hélène Juguet and Hugo Revon, serve as producers from Ubisoft Film & Television.

In addition to the Far Cry franchise, the series features characters and elements from several other Ubisoft intellectual properties, such as Assassin's Creed, Beyond Good and Evil, The Crew, Rainbow Six, Rayman, Splinter Cell and Watch Dogs.

== Release ==
Captain Laserhawk: A Blood Dragon Remix was released worldwide in October 2023 on Netflix with six episodes.

== Reception ==
On Rotten Tomatoes, the series has an approval rating of 89% based on 9 reviews, and an average rating of 6.70/10. Hayden Mears of IGN gave the show a 9 out of 10 score with an ‘amazing’ descriptor, stating that it is "as brutal as it is heartfelt, Captain Laserhawk: A Blood Dragon Remix never feels robbed of clever ways to mesh an eclectic group of Ubisoft favorites into a single madcap story." The Verge's Charles Pulliam-Moore states that the show "plays like a joyride through Ubisoft's vast library of classic video game IP".

== Other media ==
A hardcover art book, titled Captain Laserhawk: Blood Dragon Remix – The Art of the Animated Series, published by Dark Horse Books was released on October 24, 2023.

A yaoi manga prequel adaptation by Ben Kahn, and published by Tokyopop, titled Captain Laserhawk: Blood Dragon Remix: Crushing Love, was released on January 23, 2024. It features the relationship between Dolph Laserhawk and Alex Taylor.

=== Captain Laserhawk: the G.A.M.E. ===
A web3 spin-off game, titled Captain Laserhawk: the G.A.M.E., launched on December 18, 2024. The game is a top-down shooter that requires a connection to a cryptocurrency wallet and the purchase of one of the character NFTs. Rayman acts as the announcer for death matches.

The game received an overwhelmingly negative reception. Time Extension described it as "painfully basic", and lamented using Rayman to promote the game while a journalist at Polygon found that he was the tenth highest ranked player globally after finishing only three matches due to the extremely low player uptake. As of the time of the article's publication, only 94 players had played the game. It launched with many limited-run NFTs; these sold poorly and were still available in large quantities. In July 2025, Ubisoft announced that they were adding AI-governed characters to the game, which will take part in voting in the games' governance system. Didier Genevois, the project's technical director and executive producer stated that “In a universe that satirizes technocracies, surveillance, and synthetic identity, turning governance into playable fiction feels like the most honest move we could make.”
