= Tonic Trouble =

1999 video game

- PC cover art
- Developers: Ubi Soft Montreal; RFX Interactive (GBC)
- Publisher: Ubi Soft
- Director: Sandrine Polegato
- Producer: Grégoire Gobbi
- Designers: Michel Ancel; Frédéric Houde; Serge Hascoët; Gunther Galipot; Benoît Maçon
- Programmers: Julien Merceron; François Mahieu
- Artist: Stéphane Desmeules
- Writers: Stéphane Beauverger; Olivier Rigaud; David Neiss
- Composer: Eric Chevalier
- Platforms: Nintendo 64; Windows; Game Boy Color
- Release: Nintendo 64; 31 August 1999; Windows; 7 December 1999; Game Boy Color; EU: 2000
- Genre: Action-adventure
- Mode: Single-player

Tonic Trouble is a 1999 action-adventure game developed by Ubi Soft Montreal and published by Ubi Soft. The game follows janitor Ed, who drops a container of unidentified fluid from his spaceship to Earth, transforming the planet into a mutated version of itself. Drunkard Grögh drinks from the container and is granted powers that lead him to conquer Earth. Assuming the role of Ed, the player is tasked with solving puzzles and defeating enemies to acquire the tools to conquer Grögh and repossess the container to create an antidote.

Tonic Trouble was conceptualized by Michel Ancel and developed by a team of around 120 people, starting pre-production in June 1996. After multiple delays, the game was released for Nintendo 64 in August 1999, with a Windows version following that December. A Game Boy Color adaptation was made by RFX Interactive and released in Europe in 2000. Tonic Trouble received a mixed response from critics, who approved of the controls, score, level design, and graphics, but criticized the camera system, gameplay, visuals, and its derivative nature. The game sold 1.1 million copies by 2001 and was re-released with Nintendo Classics in 2025.

== Gameplay ==
Ed traversing a ski slope

Tonic Trouble is an action-adventure game played from a third-person view. The playable character, Ed, navigates three-dimensional environments through platforming and entering portals, while wielding a peashooter (used in a first-person perspective); new gadgets are rewarded as more levels are completed. Gadgets are created by a mad doctor character, who builds the peashooter, a bow tie that enables Ed to fly, a diving helmet for underwater exploration, a belt that functions as a cloaking device by letting him take the appearance of enemies, and a pogo stick that allows him to traverse lava and stomp open trapdoors. There are six levels in the Game Boy Color version, in contrast to the twelve featured in the Nintendo 64 and Windows versions.

Ed can jump, climb, fly, swim, and crawl. To unlock the ability to kick and slap enemies, he must enlarge himself into Super Ed with popcorn consumables. The health bar increases from obtaining thermometers. Ed can use a stick to beat enemies, activate switches, and pry open doorways to areas containing bonus items. Fetch quests include collecting red orbs and other items; solving puzzles can grant power-ups and help defeat enemies. Collecting bonus spheres will unlock a secret level.

== Plot ==
Tonic Trouble follows Ed, an alien janitor aboard the Mothership Albatros. In the Nintendo 64 version, he is cleaning a storage room and chases a bug to squash it. Exhausted, he drinks from an unknown tonic, spits it out, and accidentally drops the container. The liquid causes a trapdoor's screws to come alive, unscrew themselves, and allow the container to fall through toward Earth. As it lands, one drop enters a river, polluting and mutating the entire planet. Grögh, a drunkard laying nearby, drinks from the tonic and gains supernatural powers, which he uses in an attempt to conquer Earth. Following the incident, the resistance leader Agent Xyz tasks Ed to head to Earth to recover the container.

In the PC version, Ed seeks to romance a woman but becomes pursued by her boyfriend Burk, who chases him into the storage room. When Ed learns of the tonic's mutagenic properties, he throws the container into a garbage chute and sends it toward Earth. As Grögh drinks from it, he spills a drop into a river, causing the contamination. Ed is tried and, being found responsible for a level-17 ecological disaster, is ordered to repair the damage. After an unsuccessful attempt to quickly retrieve the container from Grögh, he becomes stranded on Earth and is instructed by the General to recover it.

In both versions, Ed crash-lands on a snowy mountain and travels by sled to South Plain, where he meets Suzy. She asks him to rescue her father, the Doc, who has been imprisoned by his robot following the contamination. After freeing the Doc, Ed learns that he had been building a catapult capable of launching someone into Grögh's castle. After Ed recovers the missing pieces from Grögh's henchmen, the Doc finishes the device and dispatches Ed with it. In the castle, Ed confronts and defeats Grögh to recover the tonic container and restore Earth to its original state.

== Development and release ==
Tonic Trouble was conceived and initially designed by Michel Ancel, who had created Rayman in 1995. Ancel was largely inspired by the storyline of Day of the Tentacle and the world-travelling mechanic from The Legend of Zelda: A Link to the Past. Starting pre-production in June 1996, Tonic Trouble was the first project to be developed by the previously established Ubi Soft Montreal, which devoted a team of sixty programmers, thirty animators, twelve level designers, twelve 3D artists, and four audio department employees. The game engine, known as "Architecture Commune Programmation", was built by fifty in-house staff over a course of eighteen months, with a total cost of US$4 million. Using the engine, the developers wanted to take full advantage of Intel's newest Pentium II generation of central processing units. Tonic Trouble was one of the first games to be distributed on DVD-ROM, a rarity at the time. The additional storage of DVDs allowed Ubi Soft to include a longer introduction and more music tracks. Designer Pierre Olivier Clement stated that the design team aimed at making the player rationalize every step they took, contrary to what was done in games like Duke Nukem and Quake. Furthermore, they opted to differentiate the game from its sister project, Rayman 2: The Great Escape, by focusing more strongly on adventure, whereas Rayman 2 relied more on action. The soundtrack was created in six months by composer Eric Chevalier and five in-house sound editors.

The game was first previewed as Ubi Soft's first Nintendo 64 title in Electronic Gaming Monthly's January 1997 issue, under the working title "HED" (then also the protagonist's name), and later listed on Ubi Soft's website as Ed. By that time, it had already been renamed eight times. The game was announced by Ubi Soft in April 1997, with a release slated for December 1997. The company held an online contest to determine the final name; the name "Tonic Trouble" was chosen by late April. It premiered as a Nintendo 64 and Windows title at June 1997's Electronic Entertainment Expo (E3), revealing it would have four-player cooperative multiplayer and a 64DD add-on once the cartridge version had been released, however, representatives later stated an unwillingness to focus on the 64DD, explaining that the device was still in development and puzzle-solving gameplay was incompatible with multiplayer. Critics noticed early that Tonic Trouble strongly resembled the appeal of Rayman, judging from Ed's limbless design, the colourful worlds, and similar platforming gameplay, though renewed in 3D, in contrast to Rayman's 2D visuals. Ubi Soft also entered into a partnership with Newman's Own in May 1998, which would see Tonic Trouble's Windows release include a package of Newman's Own Popcorn in the retail box, as well as Newman's Own branding on the popcorn dispensers within the game. (Note: In some versions, the dispensers bear Nestlé Crunch branding instead.) In November 1998, Newman's Own started packing $10 rebate coupons for Tonic Trouble with 4 million boxes of its popcorn products, where the coupons would expire on 1 June 1999. For every coupon redeemed with Ubi Soft, the company was to donate $1 to the Hole in the Wall Gang Camp in France.

Originally scheduled for November 1997, Tonic Trouble saw multiple delays, with its release being pushed back to early 1998, then to April 1998, June 1998, the fourth quarter of 1998, and 15 February 1999. According to an author at IGN, the version shown at E3 was in a rough state, lacking animation and suffering heavily from low framerates and stiff controls, though all of these issues had been resolved by the time they received a new preview copy in December 1998. From 9–11 October 1998, it was exhibited at the Tokyo Game Show (TGS) alongside Rayman 2. A critic from IGN noted that, although both showed great attention to detail, Rayman 2 looked "significantly sharper". An early version (designated the "Special Edition") was distributed as part of the software bundles shipped with graphics cards, including those of the Marvel G200-TV, Mystique G200, and Marvel G400-TV models by Matrox, and Guillemot's Maxi Gamer Phoenix. Around February 1999, it was rumoured that Tonic Trouble and Rayman 2 would be releasing for PlayStation, with that year's TGS line-up also shortlisting such versions for both games. In March 1999, Ubi Soft acquired a Dolby Pro Logic surround sound licence for usage within Tonic Trouble and Rayman 2. Tonic Trouble was released for Nintendo 64 on 31 August 1999 and Windows on 7 December 1999. An eponymous Game Boy Color counterpart was developed by RFX Interactive and first shown at France's Milia expo in February 2000. The conversion featured the same cast and story as the main game, while the gameplay was adapted from 3D to 2D. It was released for Game Boy Color the same year, exclusively in Europe; Ubi Soft did not plan to bring it to the United States. The Game Boy Color version was one of a number of Ubi Soft games for the platform that utilized the "Ubi Key" feature, allowing players to share data between different games via the system's infrared port and unlock extra content.

On December 17, 2025, the Nintendo 64 version of Tonic Trouble was released for the Nintendo Switch Online + Expansion Pack subscription service as part of the Nintendo Classics line of emulated games.

== Reception ==
Reception

Aggregate score
Aggregator	Score
GameRankings	N64: 53% PC: 70%

Review scores
Publication	Score
Electronic Gaming Monthly	N64: 6.12/10
Game Informer	N64: 7/10
GamePro	N64: 3.0/5
GameRevolution	N64: F
GameSpot	N64: 3/10
GameZone	PC: 8.5/10
IGN	N64: 5.0/10; PC: 6.3/10; GBC: 6.0/10
Next Generation	N64: 3/5
Nintendo Power	N64: 7.4/10

Tonic Trouble was met with mixed reception; the review aggregator website GameRankings calculated weighted average ratings of 53% for the Nintendo 64 version and 70% for the Windows release. It sold 1.1 million copies as of 2001. Electronic Gaming Monthly thought that, in terms of level design, Tonic Trouble was "a tightly developed platformer"; the control scheme was similarly praised. Game Informer wrote that the "wide variety" of gameplay and "solid" controls would be enjoyable to platformer fans. GamePro commended the musical score and sound effects, noting the puzzles as what kept the gameplay "diverse" and "challenging". Suzi Sez, reviewing the PC version for GameZone, enjoyed Tonic Trouble's "stunning" 3D graphics, "great" sound effects and music, "cute and fun" storyline, and unrelenting replay value. IGN's Matt Casamassina considered the visuals to be "good", the characters and levels to be "well designed", and the music to be one of the game's strong points. IGN's Game Boy Color review of Tonic Trouble, written by Tim Jones, described the controls as "tight and responsive" and the humour and visuals as "enjoyable". Jones thought the graphics, seen as "clear" and colourful, complemented the level design, adding that the sprites boasted "excellent" and detailed animation. He felt the music was also well made. Jeffrey Adam Young of Next Generation approved of the game world and its blend of platforming, exploration, and puzzle-solving elements. In agreement with Jones, Young lauded the "responsive" controls as well as the humour. Nintendo Power appreciated that the controls made the characters and world more enjoyable. The music was said to offer a sufficient match for the graphics.

Conversely, Electronic Gaming Monthly blamed the Nintendo 64 for the visual shortcomings, criticized boss battles for their lack of difficulty, and saw the music as insignificant, while also calling the main character "annoying" and the camera system "confusing". Game Informer disliked the graphics and noted some camera problems. GamePro disparaged the "sparse textures" and "low-res and fuzzy" characters, whose voices were regarded as "forced". Their primary issue was with the controls for being incongruent with the camera. Johnny Liu of GameRevolution gave Ed the award for "Worst Video Game Character of 1999", citing an "awful performance in the equally bad game". He slighted the "inane" story and unrefined controls, agreeing with other critics on the "irritating" camera angles and "jumbled" visuals. VideoGames.com's Ben Stahl declared Tonic Trouble "a shining example of how not to do a platform game". He termed most of the colours of the environments "an eyesore", the graphics "simply horrible", and the level design "bland and unoriginal". Disagreeing with GamePro, the soundtrack was instead interpreted as "cheesy" and of low production value. Stahl expressed disdain for the lack of sound effects, felt the gameplay was "downright lame", and also had difficulty with the camera. Casamassina dubbed Tonic Trouble the S. S. Minnow to Rayman 2's Love Boat, observing the "generic feel" as its largest obstacle. Echoing Stahl, Casamassina found there to be too few sound effects. Reviewing the game on PC, Vincent Lopez of IGN compared the game to Rayman 2 like Casamassina, faulting Tonic Trouble for being too similar to past platformers. The camera was subject to reproval for how it would inherently worsen the gameplay experience, adding to his dissatisfaction with the "wonky" controls. Jones derided the game's "shamelessly derivative" nature. Nintendo Power complained about certain areas where "hit detection" failed to take effect.
