= Eleanor's Secret =

2009 film by Dominique Monféry

- French theatrical release poster
- Directed by: Dominique Monféry
- Screenplay by: Anik Leray; Alexandre Reverend
- Produced by: Roberto Baratta; Clément Calvet; Christian Davin; Maria Fares; Xavier Julliot
- Starring: Arthur Dubois; Peppino Capotondi; Yves Degan; Lorànt Deutsch; Aarica Dubois; Alayin Dubois; Nicolas Dubois; Stéphane Flamand; Gauthier de Fauconval; Julie Gayet; Chilly Gonzales; Pablo Hertsens; Nathalie Hugo
- Edited by: Cédric Chauveau
- Music by: Christophe Héral
- Production companies: Gaumont Alphanim; La Fabrique; Lanterna Magica
- Distributed by: Haut et Court
- Release dates: 22 October 2009 (Rome Film Festival); 16 December 2009 (France)
- Running time: 80 minutes
- Countries: France; Italy
- Box office: $2.2 million

Eleanor's Secret (original French title Kérity, la maison des contes) is a 2009 animated feature film directed by Dominique Monféry. The film tells the story of a young boy who must save a group of fairy tale characters that have come to life.

== Plot ==
Seven-year-old Nathaniel and his older sister Angelica move into their eccentric Aunt Eleanor's home, which was given to their parents after she died. Angelica frequently teases her little brother for traits that she perceives as immature, such as his inability to read. When they arrive at the house, Nathaniel becomes curious about what lies in the locked room that his aunt never allowed him to enter. Much to Angelica's dismay, in her will, Eleanor states that she wants to give Nathaniel the key to the room. To Angelica, she bestows a porcelain doll. Nathaniel enters the room alone and is horrified to discover that the room is filled with books — the tales this his aunt used to read to him — this results in him running out of the room.

In the night, the house is severely damaged by a thunderstorm. Since his parents lack the funds to repair it, Nathaniel offers to allow them to sell the books. When he returns to the attic room he discovers that the miniature forms of the characters in the books have come to life. Among them are Alice in Wonderland, Puss in Boots, Pinocchio and Little Red Riding Hood. They declare that he is their new guardian, and it is his duty to read the magic spell that will keep them alive, otherwise they will disappear within the next 5 hours. Nathaniel panics when he finds that he is unable to read the spell, and the evil witch Carabosse accuses him of not being their guardian; in retaliation, she decides to shrink him down to their size.

The antique seller arrives and is delighted to discover that many of the books are first editions. He devises a plan to play them off as worthless in order to resell at a much higher price. Nathaniel and all the characters are taken to the seller's shop, forcing them to have to find a way to return to Aunt Eleanor's house in order to read the spell. He travels with Alice and an Ogre, who learns to value friendship over the immediate satiation derived from eating humans.

The group encounters many perils in their journey back including other humans and a crab on the beach, but when they arrive, Nathaniel is finally able to prove himself and read the spell aloud. He returns to the seller's shop and forces the witch to restore him to his normal size. Nathaniel then convinces his parents that the books have too much value to sell away. Angelica discovers a collection of valuable jewelry within her doll, giving the family the money they need to repair the house. The two siblings learn to value each other and enjoy reading together in the attic.

== Cast ==
| Characters | French | English |
|---|---|---|
| Nathaniel | Arthur Dubois | Pascal Berger |
| Angelica | Stéphane Flamand | Stéphane Flamand |
| Mom | Julie Gayet | Sharon Mann |
| Dad | Denis Podalydès | David Gasman |
| Eleanor | Jeanne Moreau | Jodi Forrest |
| Alice | Prunelle Rulens | Hester Wilcox |
| Ogre | Chilly Gonzalez | David Gasman |
| Adrien | Pierre Richard | Paul Bandey |
| Carabosse | Liliane Rovère | Christine Flowers |

== Music ==
Eleanor's Secret

Soundtrack album by Christophe Héral
- Released: 14 December 2009
- Genre: Film score
- Length: 50:58
- Label: Alphanim Musique

The original music for the film was composed by Christophe Héral. A soundtrack album, consisting of 24 songs from the film, was released digitally on 14 December 2009 by Alphanim Musique.

Track Listing

Eleanor's Secret (Original Motion Picture Soundtrack)
| No. | Title | Length |
|---|---|---|
| 1. | "On the Road to Kerity" | 4:39 |
| 2. | "On the Beach" | 1:42 |
| 3. | "The Truck" | 2:05 |
| 4. | "Nightmares & Illusions" | 2:29 |
| 5. | "Eleanor's Letter" | 2:45 |
| 6. | "Introduction to Mr. Pickall" | 1:51 |
| 7. | "Nathaniel, Knight of Kerity" | 1:33 |
| 8. | "The Storm" | 0:43 |
| 9. | "The Secret Library" | 4:03 |
| 10. | "The Gift of the Little Match-Seller" | 0:46 |
| 11. | "Let's Go!" | 1:47 |
| 12. | "An Unexpected Rescue" (by Christophe Héral and Laurent Julliet) | 3:31 |
| 13. | "Pickall and the Customer" | 0:53 |
| 14. | "The Baby" | 0:34 |
| 15. | "A Crab in the Castle" | 2:10 |
| 16. | "Eleanor's Piano" | 1:07 |
| 17. | "Angelica's Kite" | 1:22 |
| 18. | "Hanged on the Kite" | 3:05 |
| 19. | "Stairs" | 0:31 |
| 20. | "Fujara" | 2:17 |
| 21. | "Angelica" | 0:52 |
| 22. | "The Father" | 2:52 |
| 23. | "Eleanor's Jewels" | 4:30 |
| 24. | "Pickall" | 2:51 |
| Total length: | | 50:58 |

== Release ==
Eleanor's Secret had a limited UK cinema showing and was released on DVD in 2011 by Soda Pictures.

While the film had no general theatrical release in the United States, it did premiere at the 2010 Seattle International Film Festival. It was later released direct-to-video on 12 August 2014 from GKIDS, and distributed by Cinedigm.

=== Critical response ===
Jim Batts at We are Movie Geeks praised the film for its unique book-like visual style and for encouraging young audiences to enjoy reading: "This is a sweet, whimsical escapade that should provide inspiration for many evenings (or rainy days) of adventures via the printed page."

Jay Weissberg gives a mixed review, stating that aspects of the film, particularly the dialogue, are unoriginal, furthermore the "race back to the house, is underwhelming and lacking in originality." He does however, express appreciation for the imaginative nature of the film's visual style and its uplifting "orchestral score"

=== Awards ===
The film won the special distinction prize at the 2010 Annecy International Animated Film Festival.

At the 2011 Providence Children's Film Festival, it won the Best Feature Award.

== See also ==
- Works based on Alice in Wonderland
- History of French Animation
