= Beyond Good and Evil 2 =

Upcoming video game

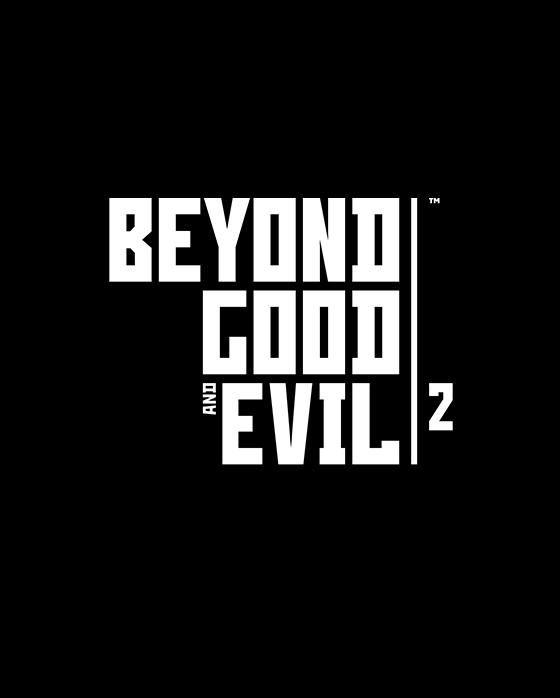
- Developer: Ubisoft Montpellier (Note: Additional work by Ubisoft Barcelona, Ubisoft Blue Byte, Ubisoft Bordeaux and Ubisoft Sofia)
- Publisher: Ubisoft
- Director: Fawzi Mesmar
- Composer: Christophe Héral
- Series: Beyond Good and Evil
- Engine: Voyager
- Release: TBA
- Genre: Action-adventure
- Modes: Single-player, multiplayer

Beyond Good and Evil 2 is a planned action-adventure game developed by Ubisoft Montpellier and to be published by Ubisoft. It is a prequel to Beyond Good & Evil (2003). The game was originally announced at Ubidays 2008, with almost a decade of silence before being re-revealed at Ubisoft's E3 2017 conference, although no release window or target platforms have been mentioned.

Its development was characterized in the media by uncertainty, doubt, and rumors about the game's future, and has been referred to as vaporware by industry figures such as Jason Schreier due to its lengthy development and lack of a release date. In 2022, Beyond Good and Evil 2 broke the record held by Duke Nukem Forever (2011) for the longest development period of a AAA video game, at more than 15 years. In 2023, the creative director, Emile Morel, died at age 40. Designer Fawzi Mesmar was appointed as the new creative director in October 2024.

== Gameplay ==
Beyond Good and Evil 2 is a video game set in an open world environment and played from a third-person perspective which takes place at least one generation before the events of Beyond Good & Evil. It has more traditional role-playing elements compared to the first game; the player creates a character that starts the game "at the very bottom of the social system". The character can be male or female. As the player completes various tasks, they improve in various attributes, and gain spacecraft and crew members which they can also improve over time. The players visit planets that have their own societies, and by completing tasks on these planets, gain new technologies or other facets to improve their spacecraft. Its original director, Michel Ancel, said they anticipate that there will be a narrative element that includes fixed story events, as well as events based on what decisions the player had made in exploring planets.

The game will have single-player and cooperative player support; even as a single-player, the player can participate in a shared universe, with some events affecting all players at the same time. Beyond Good and Evil 2 will require an internet connection to play both single-player and multiplayer.

== Development ==
Beyond Good and Evil 2 has languished for many years and is considered to have been in development hell. The game is being developed using a new engine called the Voyager Engine, developed by Ubisoft Montpellier. Composer Christophe Héral, who scored the music for the original game, will be returning for Beyond Good and Evil 2.

The original Beyond Good & Evil, released in 2003, was critically praised and gained a cult following, but was considered a commercial failure. Michel Ancel, the game's director, explained that as he wrote out the game's universe, he found it was bigger than what he could practically include within a single game, and thus anticipated the game would be the first of a trilogy of works. However, poor sales left its publisher, Ubisoft, reluctant to invest in a sequel.

=== 2007–2016: Rumors and leaks ===
A screenshot from the May 2008 teaser trailer, showing Pey'j in the foreground

Rumors about a sequel began to circulate around 2007, starting with a Nintendo Power interview with Ancel, who stated he was working on a new project that was very personal to him and mentioned his hopes to reuse Jade, the protagonist from Beyond Good & Evil, in a future project without changing her personality. Ancel said in a May 2008 interview with the French magazine Jeuxvideo.fr that a sequel to Beyond Good & Evil had been in pre-production for a year, but was yet to be approved by Ubisoft.

Later that month, as part of their Ubidays event, Ubisoft released a trailer for the next yet-unnamed project from Ubisoft Montpellier, which had worked on Beyond Good & Evil. The trailer used Beyond Good & Evil music, and featured Jade and Pey'j from the original game. Ubisoft stated that the trailer had all been recorded within the game engine, showcasing high-resolution graphics representative of seventh generation consoles capabilities. A second, leaked trailer started circulating on the internet around May 2009, showing a character that appeared to be Jade running through a crowded street. The trailer was confirmed to be authentic by Ancel, while Ubisoft denied that they had purposely released the footage.

A screenshot from the May 2009 leaked trailer showing Jade being pursued through an urban setting in a third-person perspective

Following these trailers, the state of Beyond Good and Evil 2 was unclear, with conflicting statements made by both Ubisoft and Ancel. While both reported several times that the game was still in development, rumors circulated that Ubisoft had put the game on hold, that Ubisoft had yet to officially announce the title and thus production was not officially started, and that Ancel had left Ubisoft Montpellier. By 2016, Ancel confirmed that they had put Beyond Good and Evil 2 on hold to focus on Rayman Legends (2013), which enabled them to develop tools that would help with the production of the former; once Rayman Legends was completed, they returned to Beyond Good & Evil 2. Ubisoft later noted Ancel's time was split between Beyond Good and Evil 2 and Wild, a title developed by Ancel's independent Wild Sheep Studios.

In September 2016, Ancel posted concept art on his Instagram account showing what appeared to be a younger Pey'j, hinting that Beyond Good and Evil 2 may be a prequel. The following month, Ubisoft officially announced that the game was in development at Ubisoft Montpellier.

=== 2017–2019: Formal announcement ===
On June 12, 2017, Ubisoft premiered a trailer for Beyond Good and Evil 2 during their E3 conference. Additionally, the "Space Monkey Program" was announced in collaboration with HitRecord, allowing fans to "create art and music that will be integrated directly in the game". It received criticism over concerns of unpaid labor.

A core element of the game is the ability to explore several different planets via space travel. To power this, Ubisoft Montpellier started building a solar system simulation tool about three years prior to the E3 2017 reveal to be used in the game's own engine called Voyager. This tool uses a combination of designed elements and procedural generation to assemble those elements for a given planet. The development team completed the preliminary work on the tool right before E3, allowing them to start building the rest of the game around it; at that point, Ancel considered that they were only at "day zero" of the game's development.

Ancel commented that the 2008 and 2009 trailers were from initial work as a narrative sequel to Beyond Good & Evil, but during development they opted to change direction and make it a prequel, and thus the work previously shown was from an effectively different game. At E3 2018, a new cinematic trailer for the game was unveiled, accompanied by an exclusive presentation held behind closed doors. This event was attended by game journalists and reportedly featured the game's key developers playing a live demo in co-op mode. It was also revealed that Ubisoft Montpellier was receiving additional development support from Ubisoft Barcelona, Ubisoft Bordeaux, Ubisoft Sofia and Ubisoft Blue Byte. In December 2018, Ubisoft announced that the game would require an internet connection to play at all times.

There had been rumors circulating in 2016 that it would be released as a timed exclusive for the Nintendo Switch, but Ancel refuted these claims. The "Space Monkey Program" listed Microsoft Windows, PlayStation 4 and Xbox One, however Michel Ancel stated that the platforms had not been announced yet, and that the listing was due to a bug. Ancel later told Kotaku that the game is designed to run on many platforms.

=== 2020s: Departure of Ancel and death of Morel ===
In September 2020, Michel Ancel, the game's then-director, announced his departure from Ubisoft. While the project's new director has not been publicly announced, he stated that both Beyond Good and Evil 2 and Wild were "in capable hands". The French newspaper Libération, which had been following Ubisoft's problems with a series of sexual misconduct allegations against many high-level members of the company, learned that members of Ancel's team found his leadership on the project to be unorganized and at times abusive, causing the game's development to have many restarts. The Montpellier team had reported these concerns to leadership at Ubisoft as early as 2017, but the director's close relationship with Yves Guillemot, Ubisoft's CEO, prevented any major action from occurring until the 2020 internal evaluations that led to Ancel's departure. The company stated that Ancel "hasn't been directly involved in BG&E2 for some time now" when he left the company.

In July 2021, Ubisoft stated in a financial report that development was "progressing well", but did not answer a question regarding its release date. Bloomberg later reported in February 2022, that according to developers working on the game, Beyond Good and Evil 2 was still in pre-production at that time. That same year, the game broke the record held by Duke Nukem Forever (2011) for the longest development for a video game, at more than 15 years. In July 2023, the game's creative director, Emile Morel, died at the age of 40. Fawzi Mesmar, who previously worked as VP of editorial, was subsequently appointed as the game's new creative director.

Ahead of the release of Beyond Good & Evil 20th Anniversary Edition in June 2024, Ubisoft claimed that Beyond Good and Evil 2 was still in development. Among the added content in the remaster were new narrative elements designed to link the original game to the prequel. After Prince of Persia: The Lost Crown (2024), another game developed by Ubisoft Montpellier, failed to meet sales expectations, its development team was disbanded and reallocated to other projects, with the majority reportedly moving to Beyond Good and Evil 2.

In January 2026, Ubisoft announced that a major internal restructuring was underway, which included the cancellation of six different projects. Initially, only one title – the Prince of Persia: The Sands of Time remake – was publicly named, though it was later confirmed that Beyond Good and Evil 2 was not among the games cancelled. A report from the French publication Origami affirmed the game was still planned and in pre-production at Ubisoft Montpellier but had yet to enter full production as of October 2026, as the exact nature of what the game should be has not been fully decided. The outlet reported that from 2019 to 2022, there had been attempts to make it a multiplayer live service game similar to Fortnite, but Ubisoft since dropped that idea.
