= Christophe Héral =

French film and video game composer (born 1960)

Christophe Heral
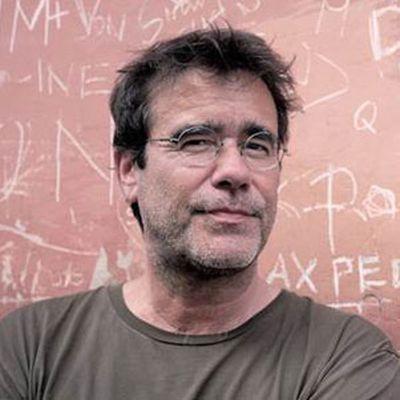

Background information
- Born: 24 November 1960 (age 64); Montpellier, France
- Occupation: Composer
- Years active: 1985–present

Christophe Héral (born 24 November 1960) is a French film and video game composer. He has composed music for Ubisoft video games such as Beyond Good & Evil, The Adventures of Tintin: The Secret of the Unicorn, Rayman Origins, Rayman Legends, and Beyond Good and Evil 2.
