= Courtney-Mae Briggs =

British actress

Courtney-Mae Briggs is a British actress who is best known for the musical theatre roles of Jennifer Parker in Back to the Future: The Musical and Peggy/Maria Reynolds in Hamilton.

== Early life and education ==
Briggs trained at the Arts Educational Schools.

== Career ==
In 2014, Briggs appeared in In the Heights for its run at the Southwark Playhouse and also its transfer at the Kings Cross Theatre in 2015, in the ensemble and covering the role of Carla. In 2016, she played Emily Waters in Strictly Ballroom at the Leeds Playhouse. She was part of the ensemble of Hamilton at the Victoria Palace Theatre from 2017, covering the role of Peggy/Maria Reynolds the following year.

Briggs played Jennifer Parker in the original cast of Back to the Future: The Musical when it opened at the Manchester Opera House in 2020. The show closed only a few days after opening due to the COVID-19 pandemic, but Briggs continued in the role when the show re-opened in London's West End at the Adelphi Theatre in 2021.

In 2023, Briggs played Andrea in Once on This Island at Regent's Park Open Air Theatre for its summer season.

She plays Melena Thropp, Elphaba and Nessarose's mother, in the two-part film adaptation of Wicked.

=== Theatre ===
Year	Title	Role	Theatre	Ref.
2015	In the Heights	Ensemble/cover Carla	Southwark Playhouse Kings Cross Theatre	
2016-2017	Strictly Ballroom	Emily Waters	Leeds Playhouse	
2017-2019	Hamilton	Ensemble, Peggy Schuyler/Maria Reynolds	Victoria Palace Theatre	
2020-2022	Back to the Future: The Musical	Jennifer Parker	Manchester Opera House Adelphi Theatre	
2023	Once on This Island	Andrea	Regent's Park Open Air Theatre	

=== Filmography ===
Year	Title	Role	Notes	Ref.
2023	Captain Laserhawk: A Blood Dragon Remix	Jade, Violet and Niji 6 (voice)	TV mini-series (6 episodes)	
2024	Wicked	Melena Thropp		
