= Kolibri Games =

German video game developer

Kolibri Games GmbH
- Formerly: Fluffy Fairy Games (2016–2018)
- Type: GmbH
- Industry: Video games
- Founded: 2016; 10 years ago
- Headquarters: Berlin, Germany
- Area served: Worldwide
- Key people: Guillaume Verlinden; (MD); Jonas Hartmann; (VPE); Paul Le Bas; (VPM)
- Revenue: 53,5 Mio. EUR
- Owner: Ubisoft (75%)
- Number of employees: 115 (2024)
- Website: kolibrigames.com

Kolibri Games GmbH (formerly Fluffy Fairy Games) is a German mobile games company based in Berlin, Germany. It was founded in 2016 by Daniel Stammler, Janosch Sadowski, Tim Reiter, Oliver Löffler and Sebastian Karasek as Fluffy Fairy Games. The company develops idle games for mobile devices and gained international recognition with their game Idle Miner Tycoon that has been downloaded over 100 million times. Ubisoft acquired a 75% majority share of Kolibri Games in February 2020 with a company valuation of €160 Million.

== History ==
The company was founded as Fluffy Fairy Games in a student apartment, without any external financing.

In July 2016, the company released Idle Miner Tycoon, a mining simulation with idle mechanics, after eight weeks of development.

In January 2018, the company moved to Berlin.

In April 2018, the company released Idle Factory Tycoon on iOS and Android. The idle game that simulates a factory empire has since been downloaded over 10 million times.

In October 2018, Fluffy Fairy Games changed its name to Kolibri Games.

Ubisoft acquired a 75% share of Kolibri in February 2020, as the company desired to expand into the "idle" mobile game venue.

== Games ==
Year	Title
2016	Idle Miner Tycoon
2018	Idle Factory Tycoon
2020	Idle Farm Tycoon
2020	Idle Pirate Tycoon
2020	Idle Restaurant Tycoon
2021	Idle Firefighter Tycoon
2021	Idle School Tycoon
2021	Idle Mail Tycoon
2022	Idle Taxi Tycoon
2022	Idle Bank Tycoon

== Acknowledgments ==
In 2018, LinkedIn added Kolibri Games to the 2018 list of Top 25 startups in Germany. Red Herring placed the company among the Top 100 Europe and Top 100 Global 2018. Kolibri Games has been awarded the first place in the Deloitte Technology Fast 50 Award in the "Rising Stars" category in 2018 and won again in 2020. Kolibri Games also made sixth place in the "Financial Times 1000: Europe’s Fastest Growing Companies" List in 2021

In 2020, Kolibri Games CEOs Janosch Sadowski and Daniel Stammler have been awarded as Young Entrepreneurs of the Year at Investor Allstars.
