= Wild (video game) =

Cancelled video game

- Developer: Wild Sheep Studio
- Publisher: Sony Interactive Entertainment
- Director: Michel Ancel
- Writer: Michel Ancel
- Platforms: PlayStation 4 PlayStation 5
- Release: Cancelled
- Genre: Survival
- Modes: Single-player, multiplayer

Wild is a cancelled survival game developed by Wild Sheep Studio and Ubisoft Paris that was to be published by Sony Interactive Entertainment. The game was announced in 2014 and had infrequent updates during development, with the game eventually being indefinitely postponed following game director Michel Ancel's retirement from the video game industry in 2020, making it a vaporware game. As of 2024, the game is no longer in development, as editorial duties were transferred to Ubisoft Paris and never finished.

== Gameplay ==
Wild is set during the prehistoric Neolithic period in a procedurally generated world. Within the game world, the player controls a human and can use smaller animals to spy on others, or larger animals to support the player and their tribe in fights with other humans. Animals can be controlled by using shamanic powers - once "possessing" an animal the gameplay moves to the point of view of the controlled creature, and then proceeds using the skills and characteristics of that animal.

== Development ==
Wild began development in 2014 at Wild Sheep Studio, a developer based in Montpellier founded by Michel Ancel from Ubisoft. Initial plans for the game included a very large, continent-sized open world, dynamic weather complete with seasonal variations, online play, and the ability to play as any wild creature in the world, including wolves, sheep, fish, ants, cats, birds, etc. A gameplay trailer for the game was shown at Gamescom in August 2014 and then at Paris Games Week in October 2015, where the developers released a new gameplay trailer and a film about the production of the game.

Due to the lack of updates during development, many journalists considered the game to be vaporware by 2020. In September 2020, Ancel announced his retirement from the gaming industry but added that development on the game would continue without him.

In July 2024, creative director Steven ter Heide confirmed on Twitter that the game was no longer being actively developed at Wild Sheep Studio. In December 2024, Ancel clarified that editorial duties were transferred to Ubisoft Paris, owing to Ubisoft's connections to him, after Wild Sheep Studio had spent time converting it to the PlayStation 5; this proved to be its undoing. Development under Ubisoft's feedback had deviated from the original playable build in 2018 to the point it did not resemble it in any way, and the studio's sexual assault controversy led to it being properly abandoned. Sony attempted to convince Wild Sheep Studio to return to their development duties but could not do so due to contracts with Ubisoft, quietly cancelling the game.
