= Yves Guillemot =

French businessman and co-founder of Ubisoft

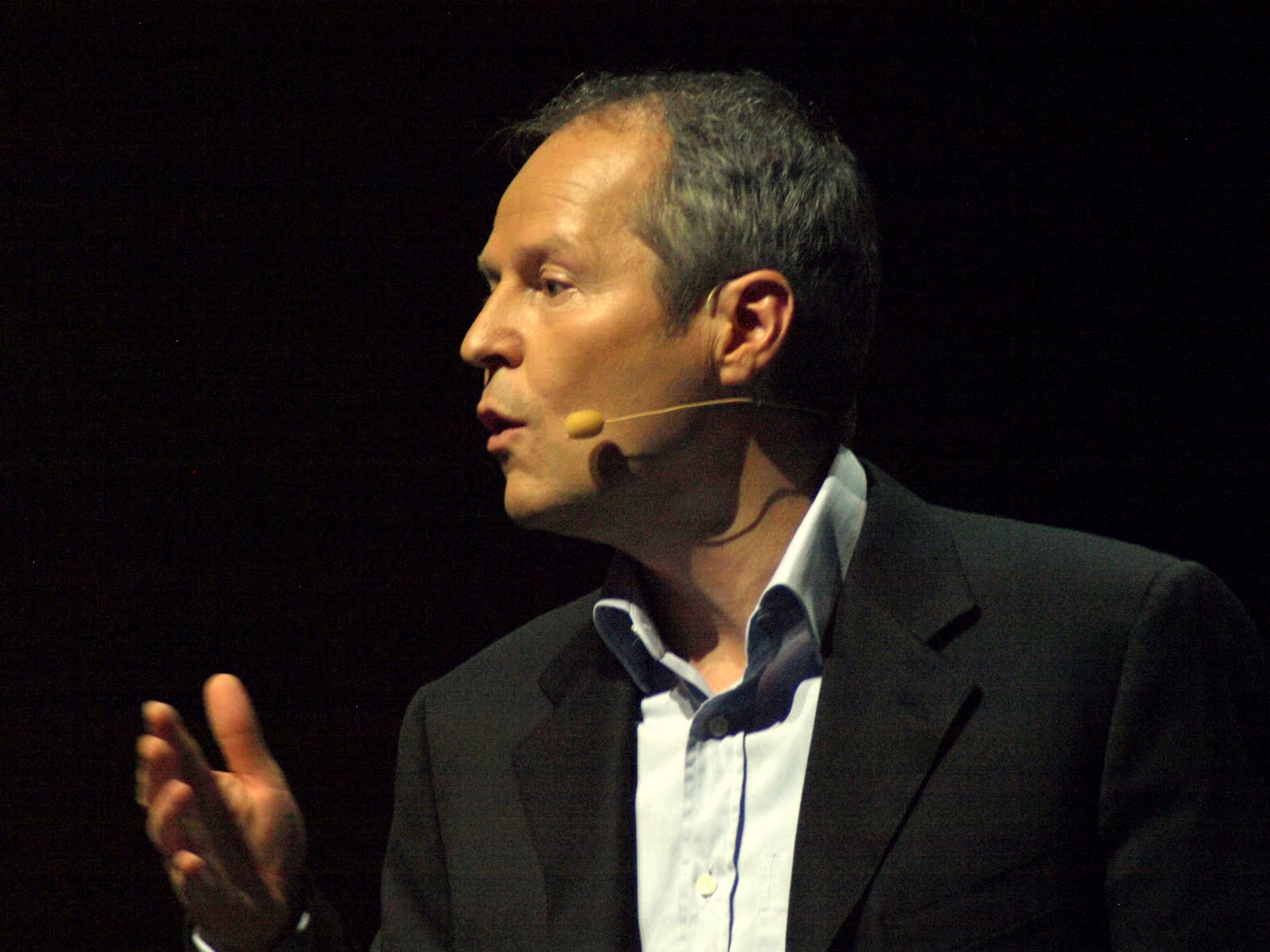
- Guillemot in 2010
- Born: Yves Marie Remy Guillemot; 21 July 1960 (age 66); Carentoir, France
- Occupation: Businessman
- Title: Chairman and CEO, Ubisoft

Yves Guillemot (English: /ˈiːv ɡiːmoʊ/ eev gee-MOH, French: [iv ɡijmo]; born 21 July 1960) is a French businessman who co-founded Ubisoft with his brothers Claude, Michel, Gérard and Christian in March 1986. He serves as the company's chairman and CEO.

== Early life ==
Yves Guillemot grew up in a small village in Brittany. Guillemot's parents owned a farming business, where he and his brothers provided support in accounting, shipping, and delivery. As the business declined with challenging profit margins, he and his brothers looked for ways to diversify. Guillemot's older brother Claude found some success selling compact disc audio. Where the family business was selling chemicals and parts to farmers, they also began selling computers, which soon included game software. When they realized that their French supplier was charging them twice the cost of what they could find in the United Kingdom, they started a mail order video games business in 1984. The mail order business grew quickly. In time, they were distributing games to retail stores, who were eager to acquire games at a more reasonable cost.

== Career ==
After earning his business degree, Guillemot and his brothers founded Ubisoft in 1986 to create games, recognizing the opportunity in a growing industry that they were also passionate about.

Guillemot has been criticized as a central figure in the ongoing Ubisoft workplace sexual misconduct scandal. Although not personally implicated in the misconduct, internal communications revealed that he was aware of and tolerated it for years, "as long as these managers' results exceeds their toxicity level". He has been accused of using his position as CEO to cover for the misconduct of people named in various investigations. An open letter from Ubisoft employees also criticized him for his lackluster response to the scandal, which included moving accused managers to other departments rather than dismissing them, as well as a reluctance to implement necessary changes to improve the workplace culture.

In a January 2023 email to staff, Guillemot told employees to take responsibility for the company's forthcoming projects, asking that "each of you be especially careful and strategic with your spending and initiatives, to ensure we're being as efficient and lean as possible" while also saying that "the ball is in your court to deliver this line-up on time and at the expected level of quality, and show everyone what we are capable of achieving."

== See also ==
- Gameloft
- Advanced Mobile Applications
