= Michel Ancel =

French video game designer (born 1972)

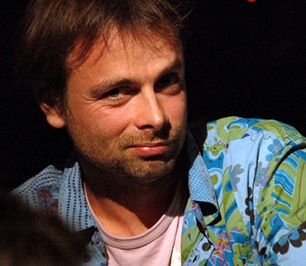
- Ancel in 2007
- Born: 29 March 1972 (age 54); Monaco
- Occupation: Game designer
- Years active: 1989–2020
- Known for: Rayman series; Beyond Good & Evil; Peter Jackson's King Kong

Michel Ancel (French pronunciation: [miʃɛl ɑ̃sɛl]; born 29 March 1972) is a retired Franco-Monégasque video game designer. He is best known for creating the Rayman franchise and was the lead designer or director for several of the games, including Rayman Origins (2011) and its sequel Rayman Legends (2013). He is also known for the critically acclaimed video game Beyond Good & Evil, as well as for King Kong, based on Peter Jackson's 2005 film of the same name. In 2017, he began work on Beyond Good and Evil 2, although he left the project in 2020.

== Early life ==
Born in Monaco in 1972, Michel Ancel spent his early years traveling all around the world due to his father's military career. It was in Tunisia where he first discovered a video game console. Since then, Ancel had been drafting game concepts while learning to program in his computer. At the age of 16, he dropped out of high-school in order to pursue his career as a graphic designer for Lankhor.

== Career ==
Ancel's first demo, Mechanic Warriors, was developed for software house Lankhor. Ancel joined UbiSoft as a graphic artist after meeting the game author Nicolas Choukroun in Montpellier at the age of 17. He designed the graphics of Choukroun's games such as The Intruder and Pick'n Pile before doing his first game as both programmer and graphic artist. Brain Blaster was released by Ubi Soft in 1990. In 1992, he began to work on Rayman, his debut as lead designer in a game. During development, Ancel moved to Carnon and Ubi Soft opened a studio there; it was named Ubi Pictures, where Ancel would reside for his tenure at Ubisoft. Rayman was released in 1995 for PlayStation, Atari Jaguar and Sega Saturn.

While Ancel was heavily involved in the development of Rayman 2: The Great Escape, his directorial debut, he would only have an advisory role on Rayman 3: Hoodlum Havoc. Although he praised the development team's efforts in the final game, he claims still that he would have "made the game differently".

In 2003, he created Beyond Good & Evil, which garnered critical acclaim and a cult following, but was a commercial failure. However, film director Peter Jackson's admiration of the game — and his frustration with EA's handling of The Lord of the Rings license — led to Ancel being given direction of the King Kong video game adaptation. In spite of Ubisoft's reluctance to produce a sequel, Ancel has expressed a clear wish to produce one in the future, which was officially announced at Ubidays 2008 event on 28 May 2008. On 18 December 2008, at the VGL event in Paris.

On 5 April 2006, Ubisoft announced that Ancel was leading the development of the fourth game in the Rayman series, eventually known as Rayman Raving Rabbids, for Wii. The game began production in early 2005 and was released on 15 November 2006 for the launch of the Wii. However, Ancel was absent from the project after its E3 announcement, and made no public appearances regarding the game after the development team switched focus from a free-roaming platformer to the final party game format shortly after E3. In the final game, Ancel was credited with storyboarding and character design, while the directorial credits were shared amongst Patrick Bodard, Jacques Exertier, Yoan Fanise and Florent Sacré.

In 2010, Ubisoft announced Rayman Origins, first unveiled as an episodic video game designed by Michel Ancel and developed by a small team of five people, but it was announced that the project had been expanded into a full game. The game was the first Ubisoft title to use the then newly-created UbiArt Framework. Developed by Ubisoft Montpellier and Ancel, UbiArt is a 2.5D game engine that allows artists and animators to easily create visual content and use it in an interactive environment. The engine is optimized for high-definition resolutions and is capable of running games at 60 frames per second in 1920x1080 resolution. UbiArt tools were expected to be released for third-party use as open-source software in 2011, but this failed to materialise due to concerns of the perceived complexities to properly develop in it raised from personnel within the company.

In 2014, Ancel announced he had formed an independent games studio called Wild Sheep. He would continue to contribute to the development of projects at Ubisoft, including "an extremely ambitious new title that is very close to his and the team's heart." Wild Sheep's first project was a survival game titled Wild. Sony Interactive Entertainment purchased the game's rights, making it a PlayStation 4 and eventually PlayStation 5 exclusive.

In September 2020, Ancel announced he was leaving the video game industry to spend time on a wildlife sanctuary. He stated that his two current projects, Beyond Good & Evil 2 and Wild, were in capable hands with his departure. Despite this, Ancel would later show dissatisfaction at Wild, as Ubisoft Paris took over development, radically reworked the game and abandoned it due to internal conflicts, rendering it effectively cancelled by Sony. One week after his departure, Libération published an article investigating allegations of Ancel's toxic leadership at Ubisoft. Ancel confirmed he was aware that he was being investigated but denied the accusations against him and called Libération's report about him "fake news".

In October 2024, Ubisoft announced in response to rumors that Ubisoft Montpellier and Ubisoft Milan had been working on a new Rayman project, with Ancel returning to the company to consult on its development.

== Recognition ==
On 13 March 2006, he, along with Shigeru Miyamoto and Frédérick Raynal, were knighted by the French Minister of Culture and Communication, Renaud Donnedieu de Vabres, under the Ordre des Arts et Lettres (Order of Arts and Letters). It was the first time that video game developers were honored with this distinction. Ancel is recognized as one of the best game designers in IGN's Top 100 Game Creators, ranking 24th out of 100.

== Design philosophy ==
Ancel aims for a high degree of freedom in his games. He is critical of games that claim to offer freedom, but present limits or invisible boundaries where players do not expect them.

== Games ==
Year	Title	Role
1989	The Intruder	Graphics
1990	Brain Blasters	Programmer, graphics, music
1990	Pick 'n Pile	Graphics, writer
1995	Rayman	Lead designer, concept
1999	Tonic Trouble	Original concept
1999	Rayman 2: The Great Escape	Director, lead game designer, art director, story
2003	Rayman 3: Hoodlum Havoc	Special thanks
2003	Beyond Good & Evil	Director, game designer, story
2005	Peter Jackson's King Kong	Director, game designer
2006	Rayman Raving Rabbids	Character designer
2007	Rayman Raving Rabbids 2	Character designer
2008	Rayman Raving Rabbids: TV Party	Character designer
2011	Rayman Origins	Director
2012	Rayman Jungle Run	Director
2013	Rayman Legends	Director
2013	Rayman Fiesta Run	Director
2015	Rayman Adventures	Director
2021	Psychonauts 2	Special Thanks
2026	Rayman Legends Retold	Consultant
TBA	Beyond Good and Evil 2	Original director
Cancelled	Wild	Original director
