= Ubisoft =

French video game company

Ubisoft Entertainment SA
- Logo used since 2017

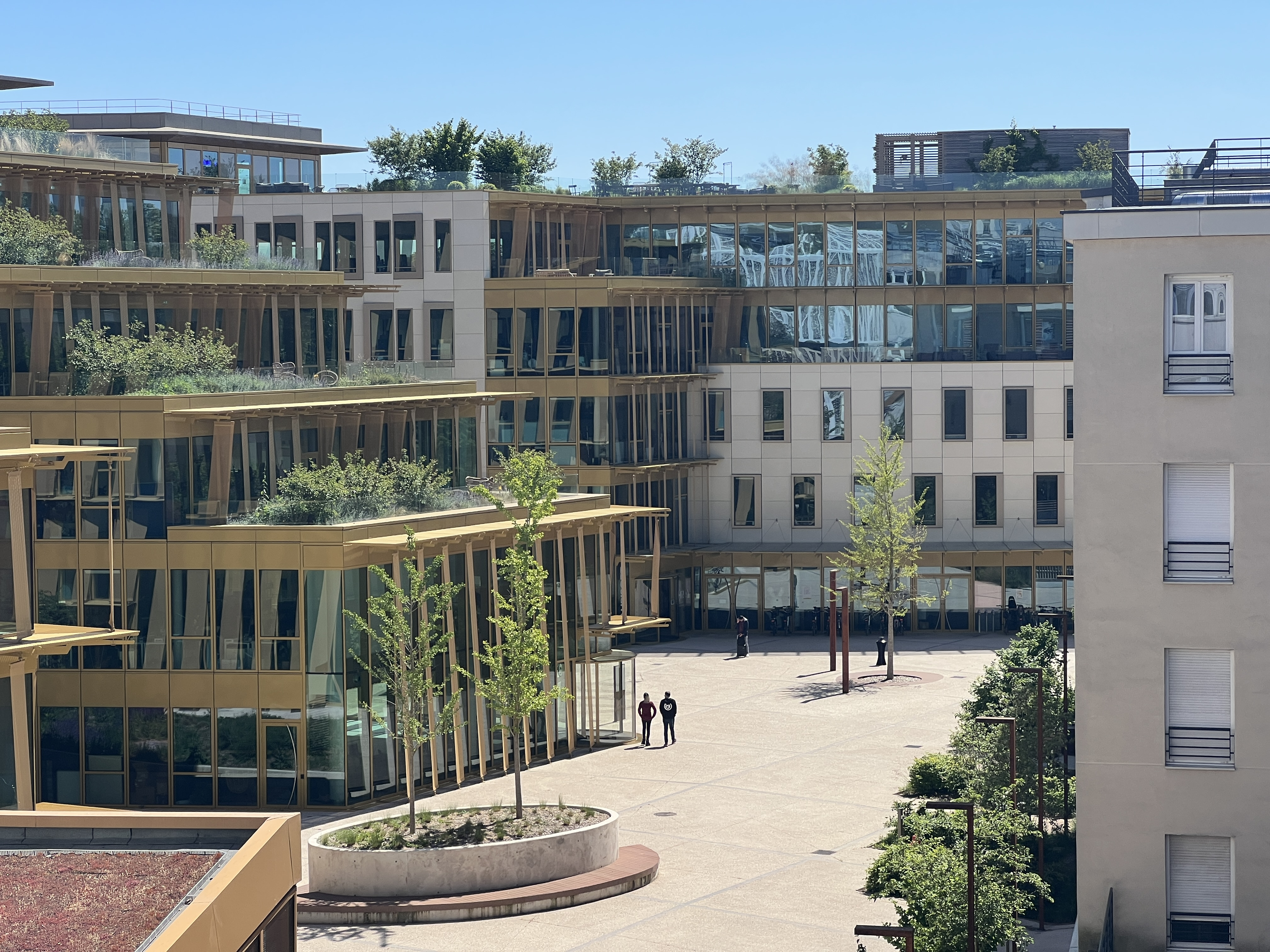
- Head office of Ubisoft in Saint-Mandé
- Formerly: Ubi Soft Entertainment SA (1986–2003)
- Type: Public
- Traded as: Euronext Paris: UBI; CAC Mid 60 component
- ISIN: FR0000054470
- Industry: Video games
- Founded: 28 March 1986; 40 years ago
- Founders: Christian Guillemot; Claude Guillemot; Gérard Guillemot; Michel Guillemot; Yves Guillemot
- Headquarters: Saint-Mandé, France
- Area served: Worldwide
- Key people: Yves Guillemot (chairman, CEO); Frédérick Duguet (CFO)
- Products: See List of Ubisoft games
- Brands: Rayman; Tom Clancy's; Prince of Persia; Far Cry; Rabbids; Assassin's Creed; Anno; Just Dance; Watch Dogs
- Services: Ubisoft Connect
- Revenue: ▼€1.395 billion (2026)
- Operating income: ▼€−1.044 billion
- Net income: ▼€−1.516 billion
- Total assets: ▼€3.945 billion
- Total equity: ▼€1.393 billion
- Owners: Guillemot family (14%); Tencent (9.99%)
- Number of employees: 16,590 (2026)
- Subsidiaries: See List of Ubisoft subsidiaries
- Website: ubisoft.com

Ubisoft Entertainment SA (/ˈjuːbisɒft/; French: [ybisɔft]; formerly Ubi Soft Entertainment SA) is a French video game publisher headquartered in Saint-Mandé with development studios across the world. Its video game franchises include Anno, Assassin's Creed, Driver, Far Cry, Just Dance, Prince of Persia, Rabbids, Rayman, Tom Clancy's, and Watch Dogs.

The company was initially founded in 1984 by Yves Guillemot, who continues to serve as its chairman and CEO, and his four brothers to provide computing software for the French agricultural sector, but moved into the more lucrative sector of video games by 1987. Its first achieved commercial and critical success was the 1995 platform game Rayman, allowing the company to expand worldwide, particularly in Shanghai, Canada, and other European countries. In the early 2000s, Ubisoft acquired the Tom Clancy's and Prince of Persia series, the later which ultimately led to creation of the Assassin's Creed series and other open world game series like Far Cry. The company successfully fended off a hostile takeover by French media conglomerate Vivendi by 2018, part of which came from Chinese media company Tencent acquiring a portion of company shares. Tencent continued to invest in Ubisoft through the 2020s, and further increased their investment to give the Guillimots and Tencent majority control of the company as to prevent a shareholder takeover. With the larger investment from Tencent, Ubisoft underwent a major reorganisation in January 2026, dividing the company amount five creative houses, including Vantage Studios and Massive Entertainment, each overseeing specific series and organised to act self-sufficiently from the larger company.

== History ==
=== Origins and first decade (1986–1996) ===
By the 1980s, the Guillemot family had established themselves as a support business for farmers in the Brittany province of France and other regions, including the United Kingdom. The five sons of the family – Christian, Claude, Gérard, Michel, and Yves – helped with the company's sales, distribution, accounting, and management with their parents before university.

All five gained business experience while at university, which they brought back to the family business after graduating. The brothers came up with the idea of diversification to sell other agricultural products; Claude began by selling CD audio media. Later, the brothers expanded to computers and additional software that included video games.

In the 1980s, they noticed that the costs of buying computers and software from a French supplier were higher than buying the same materials in the United Kingdom and shipping them to France. They developed the idea of a mail-order business for computers and software. Their mother agreed they could start their own business as long as they managed it themselves and split its shares equally among the five of them.

Their first business was Guillemot Informatique, founded in 1984. They originally sold only through mail order, but soon began receiving orders from French retailers, as it was able to undercut other suppliers by up to 50%. By 1986, this company was earning about 40 million French francs (roughly US$5.8 million at that time). In 1985, the brothers established Guillemot Corporation for similar distribution of computer hardware. As demand continued, the brothers recognised that video game software was becoming a lucrative property and decided to enter the development side of the industry, already having insight into publication and distribution.

Ubi Soft Entertainment S.A. was founded by the brothers on 28 March 1986. The name "Ubi Soft" was selected to represent "ubiquitous" software.

Ubi Soft initially operated out of offices in Paris, moving to Créteil by June 1986. The brothers used the chateau in Brittany as the primary space for development, hoping the setting would lure developers, as well as to have a better way to manage expectations of its developers. The company hired Nathalie Saloud as manager, Sylvie Hugonnier as director of marketing and public relations, and programmers, though Hugonnier had left the company by May 1986 to join Elite Software. Games published by Ubi Soft in 1986 include Zombi, Ciné Clap, Fer et Flamme, Masque, and Graphic City, a sprite editing program. As its first game, Zombi had sold 5,000 copies by January 1987. Ubi Soft also entered into distribution partnerships for the game to be released in Spain and West Germany. Ubi Soft started importing products from abroad for distribution in France, with 1987 releases including Elite Software's Commando and Ikari Warriors, the former of which sold 15,000 copies by January 1987. In 1988, Yves Guillemot was appointed Ubi Soft's chief executive officer.

By 1988, the company had about 6 developers working from the chateau. These included Michel Ancel, a teenager at the time noted for his animation skills, and Serge Hascoët, who applied to be a video game tester for the company. The costs of maintaining the chateau became more expensive, and the developers were given the option to relocate to Paris. Ancel's family which had moved to Brittany for his job could not afford the cost of living in Paris and returned to Montpellier in southern France. The Guillemot brothers told Ancel to keep them abreast of anything he might come up with there. Ancel returned with Frédéric Houde with a prototype of a game with animated features that caught the brothers' interest. Michel Guillemot decided to make the project a key one for the company, establishing a studio in Montreuil to house over 100 developers in 1994, and targeting a line of 5th generation consoles such as the Atari Jaguar and PlayStation. Their game, Rayman, was released in 1995. Yves managed Guillemot Informatique, making deals with Electronic Arts, Sierra On-Line and MicroProse to distribute their games in France. Guillemot Informatique began expanding to other markets, including the United States, the United Kingdom, and Germany. They entered the video game distribution and wholesale markets and by 1993 had become the largest distributor of video games in France.

=== Worldwide growth (1996–2003) ===
In 1996, Ubi Soft listed its initial public offering and raised over US$80 million in funds to help it to expand the company. Within 2 years, the company established worldwide studios in Annecy (1996), Shanghai (1996), Montreal (1997), and Milan (1998).

A difficulty that the brothers found was the lack of an intellectual property that would have a foothold in the United States market. When "widespread growth" of the Internet arrived around 1999, the brothers decided to take advantage of this by founding game studios aimed at online free-to-play titles, this allowed them to license the rights to Ubi Soft properties to these companies, increasing the share value of Ubi Soft five-fold. With the extra infusion of €170 million, they were able to then purchase Red Storm Entertainment in 2000, giving them access to the Tom Clancy's series of stealth and spy games. Ubi Soft helped with Red Storm to continue to expand the series, bringing titles like Tom Clancy's Ghost Recon and Tom Clancy's Rainbow Six series. The company got a foothold in the United States when it worked with Microsoft to develop Tom Clancy's Splinter Cell, an Xbox-exclusive title released in 2002 to challenge the PlayStation-exclusive Metal Gear Solid series, by combining elements of Tom Clancy's series with elements of an in-house developed game called The Drift.

In March 2001, Gores Technology Group sold The Learning Company's entertainment division (which included games originally published by Broderbund, Mattel Interactive, Mindscape and Strategic Simulations) to them. The sale included the rights to intellectual properties such as the Myst and Prince of Persia series. Ubisoft Montreal developed the Prince of Persia title into Prince of Persia: The Sands of Time released in 2003. At the same time, Ubi Soft released Beyond Good & Evil, Ancel's project after Rayman; it was one of Ubi Soft's first commercial "flops" on its release but which since has gained a cult following.

Around 2001, Ubi Soft established its editorial department headed by Hascoët, initially named as editor in chief and later known as the company's Chief Content Officer. Hascoët had worked alongside Ancel on Rayman in 1995 to help refine the game, and saw the opportunity to apply that across all of Ubi Soft's games. Until 2019, most games published by Ubisoft were reviewed through the editorial department overseen by Hascoët.

=== Continued expansion (2003–2015) ===
The evolution of the Ubisoft logo. The initial logo was created on the company's founding in 1986. With the publication of Rayman, the company used the rainbow shape to show its shift from distributor to a publisher in 1995. The blue "swirl" was introduced in 2003 with the rebranding from "Ubi Soft" to "Ubisoft", alongside its acquisition of the Tom Clancy licence. Another swirl was introduced in 2017, designed to appear as windows into its game worlds while retaining a grain de folie (touch of madness). This excludes the two logos following the 1986 logo and before the 1995 logo.

On 9 September 2003, Ubi Soft announced that it would change its name to Ubisoft, and introduced a new logo known as "the swirl". In December 2004, gaming corporation Electronic Arts purchased a 19.9% stake in the firm. Ubisoft referred to the purchase as "hostile" on EA's part. Ubisoft's brothers recognised they had not considered themselves within a competitive market, and employees had feared that an EA takeover would drastically alter the environment within Ubisoft. EA's CEO at the time, John Riccitiello, assured Ubisoft the purchase was not meant as a hostile manoeuvre, and EA ended up selling the shares in 2010.

In February 2005, Ubisoft acquired the NHL Rivals, NFL Fever, NBA Inside Drive and MLB Inside Pitch franchises from Microsoft Game Studios. On 8 January 2009, Square Enix signed an agreement with Ubisoft where the former would work to assist the latter in distributing its video games in Japan.

Ubisoft established another IP, Assassin's Creed, first launched in 2007; Assassin's Creed was originally developed by Ubisoft Montreal as a sequel to Prince of Persia: The Sands of Time and instead transitioned to a story about Assassins and the Templar Knights. In July 2006, Ubisoft bought the Driver franchise from Atari for a sum of €19 million in cash for the franchise, technology rights, and most assets. Within 2008, Ubisoft made a deal with Tom Clancy for perpetual use of his name and intellectual property for video games and other auxiliary media.

Gameloft, founded in 1999 by Michel Guillemot as a separate venture from Ubisoft to explore games for mobile phones, was closely tied to Ubisoft and had a right of first refusal to port any Ubisoft game to mobile. Gameloft began releasing ports of Ubisoft games 2006 and 2007, including several Assassin's Creed games. In 2007, Ubisoft sold their stake in Gameloft to Credit Agricole, though maintained the development partnerships for its games. Gameloft continued to be one of the leading mobile developers, particularly after the introduction of the iPhone in 2007. Over time, Ubisoft shifted from licensing to publishers like GameLoft to creating their own development studios for mobile games around 2010, and by 2015, mobile game sales had made up 26% of Ubisoft's revenues, in part due to heavy usage within China.

In July 2008, Ubisoft made the acquisition of Hybride Technologies, a Piedmont-based studio. In November 2008, Ubisoft acquired Massive Entertainment from Activision. In January 2013, Ubisoft acquired South Park: The Stick of Truth from THQ for $3.265 million.

Ubisoft announced plans in 2013 to invest $373 million into its Quebec operations over 7 years. The publisher is investing in the expansion of its motion capture technologies and consolidating its online games operations and infrastructure in Montreal. By 2020, the company would employ more than 3,500 staff at its studios in Montreal and Quebec City. In February 2013, it began offering games from third-party publishers including Electronic Arts and Warner Bros. Interactive Entertainment on Uplay and its own games to EA's Origin.

In July 2013, Ubisoft announced a breach in its network resulting in the potential exposure of up to 58 million accounts including usernames, email address, and encrypted passwords. The firm denied any credit/debit card information could have been compromised, issued directives to all registered users to change their account passwords, and recommended updating passwords on any other website or service where a same or similar password had been used. All the users who registered were emailed by the Ubisoft company about the breach and a password change request. Ubisoft promised to keep the information safe.

In March 2015, the company set up a Consumer Relationship Centre in Newcastle-upon-Tyne. The centre is intended to integrate consumer support teams and community managers. Consumer Support and Community Management teams at the CRC are operational 7 days a week.

=== Attempted takeover by Vivendi (2015–2018) ===
Since around 2015, the French mass media company Vivendi has been seeking to expand its media properties through acquisitions and other business deals. In addition to advertising firm Havas, Ubisoft was one of the first target properties identified by Vivendi, which as of September 2017 has an estimated valuation of $6.4 billion. Vivendi, in two actions during October 2015, bought shares in Ubisoft stock, giving it a 10.4% stake in Ubisoft, an action that Yves Guillemot considered "unwelcome" and feared a hostile takeover. In a presentation during the Electronic Entertainment Expo 2016, Yves Guillemot stressed the importance that Ubisoft remain an independent company to maintain its creative freedom. Guillemot later described the need to fight off the takeover: "...when you're attacked with a company that has a different philosophy, you know it can affect what you've been creating from scratch. So you fight with a lot of energy to make sure it can't be destroyed." Vice-president of Live Operations, Anne Blondel-Jouin, expressed similar sentiment in an interview with PCGamesN, stating that Ubisoft's success was partly due to "...being super independent, being very autonomous."

Vivendi acquired stake in mobile game publisher Gameloft, owned by the Guillemots, and started acquiring Ubisoft shares. In the following February, Vivendi acquired €500 million worth of shares in Gameloft, gaining more than 30% of the shares and requiring the company under French law to make a public tender offer; this action enabled Vivendi to complete the takeover of Gameloft by June 2016. Following Vivendi's actions with Gameloft in February 2016, the Guillemots asked for more Canadian investors in the following February to fend off a similar Vivendi takeover; by this point, Vivendi had increased its share in Ubisoft to 15%, exceeding the estimated 9% that the Guillemots owned. By June 2016, Vivendi had increased its shares to 20.1% and denied it was in the process of a takeover.

By the time of Ubisoft's annual board meeting in September 2016, Vivendi had gained 23% of the shares, while the Guillemots were able to increase their voting share to 20%. A request was made at the board meeting to place Vivendi representatives on Ubisoft's board, given the size of its shareholdings. The Guillemots argued against this, reiterating that Vivendi should be seen as a competitor, and succeeded in swaying other voting members to deny any board seats to Vivendi.

Vivendi continued to buy shares in Ubisoft, approaching the 30% mark that could trigger a takeover; as of December 2016, Vivendi held a 25.15% stake in Ubisoft. Reuters reported in April 2017 that Vivendi's takeover of Ubisoft would likely happen that year and Bloomberg Businessweek observed that some of Vivendi's shares would reach the 2-year holding mark, which would grant them double voting power, and would likely meet or exceed the 30% threshold. The Guillemot family has since raised its stake in Ubisoft; as of June 2017, the family held 13.6% of Ubisoft's share capital, and 20.02% of the company's voting rights. In October 2017, Ubisoft announced it reached a deal with an "investment services provider" to help it purchase back 4 million shares by the end of the year, preventing others, specifically Vivendi, from buying these.

In the week before Vivendi would gain double-voting rights for previously purchased shares, the company, in quarterly results published in November 2017, announced that it had no plans to acquire Ubisoft for the next 6 months, nor would seek board positions due to the shares it held during that time, and that it "would ensure that its interest in Ubisoft would not exceed the threshold of 30% through the doubling of its voting rights." Vivendi remained committed to expanding in the video game sector, identifying that its investment in Ubisoft could represent a capital gain of over 1 billion euros.

On 20 March 2018, Ubisoft and Vivendi struck a deal ending any potential takeover, with Vivendi agreeing to sell all of its shares, over 30 million, to other parties and agreeing to not buy any Ubisoft shares for 5 years. Some of those shares were sold to Tencent, which after the transaction held about 5.6 million shares of Ubisoft (approximately 5% of all shares). The same day, Ubisoft announced a partnership with Tencent to help bring its games onto the Chinese market. Vivendi completely divested its shares in Ubisoft by March 2019.

=== Investment by Tencent (2018–2022) ===
Since 2018, Ubisoft's studios have continued to focus on some franchises, including Assassin's Creed, Tom Clancy's, Far Cry, and Watch Dogs. As reported by Bloomberg Businessweek, while Ubisoft as a whole had nearly 16,000 developers by mid-2019, larger than some of its competitors, and producing 5 to 6 major AAA releases each year compared to the 2 or 3 from the others, the net revenue earned per employee was the lowest of the 4 due to generally lower sales of its games. Bloomberg Business attributed this partially due to spending trends by video game consumers purchasing fewer games with long playtimes, as most of Ubisoft's major releases tend to be. To counter this, Ubisoft in October 2019 postponed 3 of the 6 titles it had planned in 2019 to 2020 or later, as to help place more effort on improving the quality of the existing and released games. Due to overall weak sales in 2019, Ubisoft stated in January 2020 that it would be reorganizing its editorial board to provide a more comprehensive look at its game portfolio and devise greater variation in its games which Ubisoft's management said had fallen stagnant, too uniform and had contributed to weak sales.

Stemming from a wave of sexual misconduct accusations of the #MeToo movement in June and July 2020, Ubisoft had a number of employees accused of misconduct from both internal and external sources. Between Ubisoft's internal investigation and a study by the newspaper Libération, employees had been found to have records of sexual misconduct and troubling behaviour, going back up to 10 years, which had been dismissed by the human resources departments. As a result, some Ubisoft staff either quit or were fired, including Hascoët, Maxime Béland, the co-founder of Ubisoft Toronto, and Yannis Mallat, the managing director of Ubisoft's Canadian studios. Yves Guillemot implemented changes in the company to address these issues as it further investigated the extent of the misconduct claims.

Ubisoft stated in its end of 2020 fiscal year investor call in February 2021 that the company will start to make AAA game releases less of a focus and put more focus on mobile and freemium games following fiscal year 2022. CFO Frederick Duguet stated to investors that "we see that we are progressively, continuously moving from a model that used to be only focused on AAA releases to a model where we have a combination of strong releases from AAA and strong back catalog dynamics, but also complimenting our program of new releases with free-to-play and other premium experiences." Later that year, the company announced it would start branding games developed by its first-party developers as "Ubisoft Originals".

In 2021, it announced that it would be making an open world Star Wars game. The deal marked an end to EA's exclusive rights to make Star Wars titles. In October 2021, Ubisoft participated in a round of financing in Animoca Brands.

In November 2021, Ubisoft announced the development of its first Ubisoft Entertainment Center, created by experience design firm Storyland Studios and Alterface. The first location is set to open in Studios Occitanie Méditerranée by 2025.

Ubisoft has been increasingly involved in blockchain-based video games since the later 2010s. The company is a co-founder of the Blockchain Game Alliance, which was established in September 2018 and is a consortium of several companies active in the blockchain space that seeks to explore the potential applications of this technology in the video game industry and publicly promotes the use of blockchain-based content in video games. According to Yves Guillemot, one of Ubisoft's co-founders, crypto-based content in video games will allow players to actually own digital content within it, while growing the video game industry in the process. Ubisoft furthermore announced its Ubisoft Quartz blockchain program in December 2021, allowing players to buy uniquely identified customization items for games and then sell and trade them based on the Tezos currency, which Ubisoft claimed was an energy efficient cryptocurrency. This marked the first "AAA" effort into blockchain games. The announcement was heavily criticized by audiences, with the Quartz announcement video attaining a dislike ratio of 96% on YouTube. Ubisoft subsequently unlisted the video from YouTube. The announcement was also criticized internally by Ubisoft developers.

In July 2022, Ubisoft announced that it had cancelled Splinter Cell VR and Ghost Recon Frontline, along with two other unannounced titles. In September, Tencent invested another €300 million into Guillemot Brothers Limited, the company that holds part of the Guillemots' ownership of Ubisoft. This gave Tencent 49.9% ownership in this holding company and increased the Guillemots' share of voting rights within Ubisoft to about 30%. Yves Guillemot said that Tencent would be working closely with Ubisoft, helping to bring its games into China while assisting in paying off Ubisoft's debts and preventing the company from potential buyouts.

=== Financial concerns and major restructuring process (2023–present) ===
Citing disappointing financial results in the previous quarter, Ubisoft cancelled another three previously unannounced games in January 2023. In an email to staff, Yves Guillemot told employees to take responsibility for the company's forthcoming projects, asking that "each of you be especially careful and strategic with your spending and initiatives, to ensure we're being as efficient and lean as possible", while also saying that "The ball is in your court to deliver this line-up on time and at the expected level of quality, and show everyone what we are capable of achieving." Union workers at Ubisoft Paris took issue with this message, calling for a strike and demanding higher salaries and improved working conditions.

In August 2023, Ubisoft announced that it had reached a 15-year agreement with Microsoft to license the cloud gaming rights to Activision Blizzard titles; this came as part of efforts by Microsoft to receive approval from the UK Competition and Markets Authority (CMA) for its acquisition of Activision Blizzard. The agreement would allow Activision Blizzard games to appear on Ubisoft+, and allow Ubisoft to sublicense the cloud gaming rights for the games to third-parties.

As part of a cost reduction plan, Ubisoft reduced its number of employees from 20,279 in 2022 to 19,410 in September 2023. In November 2023, Ubisoft laid off 124 employees from its VFX and IT teams. In March 2024, Ubisoft laid off 45 employees from its publishing teams. Another 45 employees were cut between its San Francisco and Cary, North Carolina offices in August 2024. By the end of September 2024, Ubisoft had reduced its number of employees to 18,666.

In 2024, Ubisoft released multiple games that experienced underperforming sales and declining playerbases post-launch, which included Avatar: Frontiers of Pandora, Skull and Bones, XDefiant, and Star Wars Outlaws, causing its stock to fall to nearly its lowest levels in the previous decade. As a result, the company announced it was launching an investigation of its development cycles to focus on a "player-centric approach", and opted to delay its next major flagship game, Assassin's Creed Shadows, from November 2024 to February 2025.

On 16 October 2024, over 700 Ubisoft employees in France began a three-day strike, protesting the company's requirement to return to the office three days a week. The strike, organized by the STJV union, involved Ubisoft's offices in Paris, Montpellier, Lyon, and Annecy. Workers expressed dissatisfaction over a lack of flexibility, salary increases, and profit-sharing, which they believe the company has ignored. Ubisoft has yet to address the union's concerns.

In December 2024, Ubisoft announced that its free-to-play game XDefiant would be shutting down in June 2025, less than a year after its initial release. They also announced that its lead development studio Ubisoft San Francisco, and Ubisoft Osaka, were to close, resulting in up to 277 employees being laid off.

In January 2025, Ubisoft closed the Ubisoft Leamington studio and downsized several other studios, resulting in up to 185 staff being laid off as part of ongoing cost-cutting measures.

Around September 2024, one of Ubisoft's shareholders, AJ Investments, stated it was seeking to have the company purchased by a private equity firm and would push out the Guillemot family and Tencent from ownership of the company. Bloomberg News reported in October 2024 that the Guillemots and Tencent were considering this and other alternatives to shift ownership of the company in light of the recent poor financial performance. Later reports in December 2024 suggested that Tencent was seeking to capture a majority stake in Ubisoft and take the company private, while still giving the Guillemot family control of Ubisoft. In January 2025, it was reported that the Guillemots had also considered carving out certain Ubisoft assets into a new subsidiary, which would allow Tencent to make targeted investments to increase the company's overall value. Ubisoft announced this subsidiary on 27 March 2025, devoted to its flagship Assassin's Creed, Far Cry, and Rainbow Six franchises; the subsidiary will consist of the franchises' assets and development teams, and have dedicated leadership. Tencent will make a €1.16 billion investment in the new subsidiary, giving it a 25% stake at a valuation of €4 billion; the value of this subsidiary is larger than the current valuation of Ubisoft, which is based on Tencent's belief that these properties are undervalued. Ubisoft stated that the subsidiary would "focus on building game ecosystems designed to become truly evergreen and multi-platform". The new subsidiary, Vantage Studios, was unveiled in October 2025, with Christophe Derennes and Charlie Guillemot to be co-CEOs.

With its financial quarterly report on July 2025, Ubisoft stated that it will reorganize into "creative houses" that will "enhance quality, focus, autonomy and accountability while fostering closer connections with players", with the previously announced Tencent-backed subsidiary as an example of such a division. At the end of August, Ubisoft sold the rights to five of its titles, including Grow Home and Cold Fear, to Atari SA. During October 2025, Ubisoft said it was looking to cut about 60 positions at Ubisoft Redlynx, and pushed for voluntarily layoffs at Massive.

Just prior to releasing its half-year financial report in November 2025, Ubisoft announced it was delaying the report, and further requested that Euronext stop all trading of its shares, which was explained to employees as "to limit unnecessary speculation and market volatility during this short delay". On 21 November, Ubisoft released its half-year financial report, where it announced that it had reduced its number of employees to 17,097 by the end of September 2025.

Ubisoft acquired March of Giants, a free-to-play MOBA developed by Amazon Games's Montreal studio, in December 2025 in the wake of Amazon cutting back on internal game development. Ubisoft's acquisition included members of its development team, including senior production lead Alex Parizeau and creative director Xavier Marquis, formerly of Rainbow Six Siege.

In December 2025, approximately 60 workers at Ubisoft Halifax voted to unionize with CWA Canada, forming the first union of Ubisoft workers in North America. On 7 January 2026, it was announced that Ubisoft was closing the studio, affecting 70 people; Ubisoft claimed that the decision to close the studio was made prior to their unionization.

In January 2026, Ubisoft reported that it was undergoing a major restructuring, organizing the company into five creative houses, each "will be shaped by distinct creative 'genres' led by dedicated high-profile, incentivized teams with a unique set of expertise in those genres" and "have full financial ownership and account for economic performance." With the announcement, the company also cancelled development of six games, including the planned Prince of Persia: The Sands of Time remake, and said layoffs are expected as part of this reorganization. Yves Guillemot said that after COVID, Ubisoft had taken on several projects in anticipation of growing market demand that never materialized, and this change was needed to recoup around $200 million in costs.

Following this, Ubisoft laid off about 100 staff at Red Storm Entertainment in March 2026 and terminated further game development at the studio. The company cancelled Alterra, a game mashing up elements of Animal Crossing and Minecraft, that was never formally announced but rumored to be in development since 2024. No additional layoffs were planned around this. By the end of March 2026, Ubisoft had reduced their number of employees to 16,590.

On 19 June 2026, Ubisoft co-founder Claude Guillemot and a flight instructor died at the age of 69 when his Cessna 421 Golden Eagle crashed into a field shortly before 6:00 p.m. while on approach to the La Baule-Escoublac Airfield in La Baule-Escoublac, Pays de la Loire, France.

== Structure ==
Following the January 2026 restructure, Ubisoft is divided into five major development houses consisting of multiple studios, along with a support division. These were as follows

- Vantage Studios (Creative House 1)
  - Series covered: Assassin's Creed, Far Cry, Tom Clancy's Rainbow Six
  - Studios: Barcelona, Montreal Vantage, Quebec, Saguenay, Sherbrooke, Sofia
- Massive Entertainment (Creative House 2)
  - Series covered: Tom Clancy's The Division, Tom Clancy's Ghost Recon, Tom Clancy's Splinter Cell, March of Giants, unspecified new IP
  - Studios: Paris, Massive/Malmo, Montreal, Toronto
- Creative House 3
  - Series covered: Brawlhalla, For Honor, Riders Republic, Skull and Bones, The Crew
  - Studios: Blue Mammoth, Ivory Tower, Montreal
- Creative House 4
  - Series covered: Anno, Beyond Good and Evil, Heroes of Might and Magic, Prince of Persia, Rayman
  - Studios: Mainz, Milan, Montpelier, Nadeo
- Creative House 5
  - Series covered: Growtopia, Hasbro portfolio
  - Studios: Abu Dhabi, Barcelona Mobile, Ketchapp, Kalibri Games, Paris, Ubisoft Mobile Games, Ubisoft Paris Mobile
- Creative Network
  - Studios: Annecy, Berlin, Bordeaux, Chengdu, Da Nang, Dusseldorf, Kyiv/Odessa/Warsaw, Paris, Pune, Manila, RedLynx, Red Storm, Reflections, Romania, Shanghai, Singapore

In its November 2026 financial report, Ubusift announced it had merged Creative Houses 3 and 5. It had also moved Motherbrain to its own subsidiary to expand on AI game development, and created another subsidiary to manage Ubisoft's IPs not covered by the Creative Houses.

== Subsidiaries ==
Name	Location	Founded	Acquired	Ref.
1492 Studio	Vailhauquès, France	2014	March 2018	
Blue Mammoth Games	Atlanta, United States	2009	March 2018	
Green Panda Games	Paris, France	2013	July 2019	
Hybride Technologies	Piedmont, Quebec, Canada	1991	2008	
i3D.net	Rotterdam, Netherlands	2002	March 2019	
Ketchapp	Paris, France	March 2014	September 2016	
Kolibri Games	Berlin, Germany	2016	February 2020	
Massive Entertainment	Malmö, Sweden	1997	November 2008	
Owlient	Paris, France	2005	2011	
Quazal	Montreal, Canada	1998	November 2010	
Red Storm Entertainment	Cary, North Carolina, United States	November 1996	August 2000	
Ubisoft Abu Dhabi	Abu Dhabi, United Arab Emirates	October 2011	—N/a	
Ubisoft Annecy	Annecy, France	1996	—N/a	
Ubisoft Barcelona	Barcelona, Spain	1998	—N/a	
Ubisoft Barcelona Mobile	Barcelona, Spain	2002	September 2013	
Ubisoft Berlin	Berlin, Germany	January 2018	—N/a	
Ubisoft Bordeaux	Bordeaux, France	September 2017	—N/a	
Ubisoft Bucharest	Bucharest, Romania	1992	—N/a	
Ubisoft Chengdu	Chengdu, Sichuan, China	2008	—N/a	
Ubisoft Düsseldorf	Düsseldorf, Germany	October 1988	January 2001	
Ubisoft Da Nang	Da Nang, Vietnam	September 2019	—N/a	
Ubisoft Ivory Tower	Villeurbanne, France	September 2007	October 2015	
Ubisoft Kyiv	Kyiv, Ukraine	April 2008	—N/a	
Ubisoft Mainz	Mainz, Germany	October 1988	January 2001	
Ubisoft Milan	Milan, Italy	1998	—N/a	
Ubisoft Montpellier	Castelnau-le-Lez, France	1994	—N/a	
Ubisoft Montreal	Montreal, Canada	1997	—N/a	
Ubisoft Mumbai	Mumbai, India	June 2018	—N/a	
Ubisoft Nadeo	Paris, France	November 2000	October 2009	
Ubisoft Odesa	Odesa, Ukraine	March 2018	—N/a	
Ubisoft Paris	Montreuil, France	1992	—N/a	
Ubisoft Paris Mobile	Montreuil, France	2013	—N/a	
Ubisoft Film & Television	Montreuil and Los Angeles	January 2011	—N/a	
Ubisoft Philippines	Taguig, Philippines	March 2016	—N/a	
Ubisoft Pune	Pune, India	2000	2008	
Ubisoft Quebec	Quebec City, Canada	June 2005	—N/a	
Ubisoft Redlynx	Helsinki, Finland	August 2000	November 2011	
Ubisoft Reflections	Newcastle upon Tyne, England	July 1984	July 2006	
Ubisoft Saguenay	Chicoutimi, Canada	February 2018	—N/a	
Ubisoft Shanghai	Shanghai, China	1996	—N/a	
Ubisoft Sherbrooke	Sherbrooke, Canada	November 2021	—N/a	
Ubisoft Singapore	Singapore	July 2008	—N/a	
Ubisoft Sofia	Sofia, Bulgaria	2006	—N/a	
Ubisoft Stockholm	Stockholm, Sweden	2017	—N/a	
Ubisoft Toronto	Toronto, Canada	May 2010	—N/a	
Vantage Studios	A consolidation of portions of teams from Montreal, Quebec, Sherbrooke, Saguenay, Barcelona, and Sofia that will primarily oversee the Assassin's Creed, Far Cry, and Rainbow Six IPs.	October 2025	—N/a	

=== Former ===
Name	Location	Founded	Acquired	Closed	Ref.
GAME Studios	Los Angeles, United States	January 2001	March 2001	March 2001	
Microïds Canada	Montreal, Canada	—N/a	March 2005	March 2005	
Related Designs	Mainz, Germany	1995	April 2013	June 2014	
Sinister Games	Chapel Hill, North Carolina, United States	1997	May 2000	2003	
Southlogic Studios	Porto Alegre, Brazil	1996	January 2009	January 2009	
Sunflowers Interactive	Heusenstamm, Germany	1993	April 2007	April 2007	
THQ Montreal	Montreal, Canada	October 2010	January 2013	January 2013	
Tiwak	Montpellier, France	August 2000	December 2003	March 2011	
Ubi Studios	Oxford, England	—N/a	May 2000	—N/a	
Ubisoft Belgrade	Belgrade, Serbia	November 2016		June 2026	
Ubisoft Casablanca	Casablanca, Morocco	April 1998	—N/a	June 2016	
Ubisoft Halifax	Halifax, Nova Scotia, Canada	2003	October 2015	January 2026	
Ubisoft Leamington	Leamington Spa, England	November 2002	January 2017	January 2025	
Ubisoft London	London, England	2009	October 2013	September 2023	
Ubisoft Osaka	Osaka, Japan	1996	2008	December 2024	
Ubisoft San Francisco	San Francisco, United States	2009	—N/a	December 2024	
Ubisoft São Paulo	São Paulo, Brazil	July 2008	—N/a	2010	
Ubisoft Vancouver	Vancouver, Canada	2006	February 2009	January 2012	
Ubisoft Winnipeg	Winnipeg, Canada	April 2018	—N/a	June 2026	
Ubisoft Zurich	Thalwil, Switzerland	August 2011	—N/a	October 2013	
Wolfpack Studios	Round Rock, Texas, United States	1999	March 2004	May 2006	

== Technology ==
=== Ubisoft Connect ===
Ubisoft Connect, formerly Uplay, is a digital distribution, digital rights management, multiplayer and communications service for PC created by Ubisoft. First launched alongside Assassin's Creed II as a rewards program to earn points towards in-game content for completing achievements within Ubisoft, it expanded into a desktop client and storefront for Windows machine alongside other features. Ubisoft then separated the rewards program out as its Ubisoft Club program, integrated with Uplay. Ubisoft Connect was announced in October 2020 as a replacement for UPlay and its Ubisoft Club to launch on 29 October 2020 alongside Watch Dogs: Legion. Connect replaces UPlay and the club's previous functions while adding support for cross-platform play and save progression for some games. It includes the same reward progression system that the Club offered to gain access to in-game content. Some games on the UPlay service will not be updated to support these reward features that they previously had under the Ubisoft Club; for those, Ubisoft will unlock all rewards for all players.

Uplay/Ubisoft Connect serves to manage the digital rights for Ubisoft's games on Windows computers, which has led to criticism when it was first launched, as some games required always-on digital rights management, causing loss of save game data should players lose their Internet connection. The situation was aggravated after Ubisoft's servers were struck with denial of service attacks that made the Ubisoft games unplayable due to this DRM scheme. Ubisoft eventually abandoned the always-on DRM scheme and still require all Ubisoft games to perform a start-up check through Uplay/Ubisoft Connect servers when launched.

=== Game engines ===
==== Ubisoft Anvil ====
Ubisoft Anvil, formerly named Scimitar, Anvil and AnvilNext, is a proprietary game engine developed wholly within Ubisoft Montreal in 2007 for the development of the first Assassin's Creed game and has since been expanded and used for most Assassin's Creed titles and other Ubisoft games, including Ghost Recon Wildlands, Ghost Recon Breakpoint and For Honor.

==== Disrupt ====
The Disrupt game engine was developed by Ubisoft Montreal and is used for the Watch Dogs games. Developer Ubisoft Montreal spent four years creating the engine. The majority of Disrupt was built from scratch and uses a multithreaded renderer, running on fully deferred physically based rendering pipeline with some technological twists to allow for more advanced effects. The engine also has a feature that allows players to connect and disconnect their game from others without causing major disruptions in the game environment or storyline progress. Its open world city management comes from AnvilNext while its vegetation and AI are from Dunia. Parts of the engine were originally intended for another game in the Driver franchise.

==== Dunia ====
The Dunia engine is a software fork of the CryEngine that was originally developed by Crytek, with modifications made by Ubisoft Montreal. The CryEngine at the time could render some outdoor environmental spaces. Crytek had created a demo of its engine called X-Isle: Dinosaur Island which it had demonstrated at the Electronic Entertainment Expo 1999. Ubisoft saw the demo and had Crytek build out the demo into a full title, becoming the first Far Cry, released in 2004. That year, Electronic Arts established a deal with Crytek to build a wholly different title with an improved version of the CryEngine, leaving it unable to continue work on Far Cry. Ubisoft assigned Ubisoft Montreal to develop console versions of Far Cry, and arranging with Crytek to have all rights to the Far Cry series and a perpetual licence on the CryEngine.

In developing Far Cry 2, Ubisoft Montreal modified the CryEngine to include destructible environments and a more realistic physics engine. This modified version became the Dunia engine which premiered with Far Cry 2 in 2008. The Dunia engine continued to be improved, such as adding weather systems, and used as the basis of all future Far Cry games, and Avatar: The Game, developed by Ubisoft Montreal.

Ubisoft introduced the Dunia 2 engine first in Far Cry 3 in 2012, which was made to improve the performance of Dunia-based games on consoles and to add more complex rendering features such as global illumination. The Dunia 2 engine was further refined in Far Cry 4, and Far Cry 5. According to Remi Quenin, one of the engine's architects at Ubisoft Montreal, the state of the Dunia engine by 2017 included "vegetation, fire simulation, destruction, vehicles, systemic AI, wildlife, weather, day/night cycles, [and] non linear storytelling" which are elements of the Far Cry games. For Far Cry 6, Ubisoft introduced more features to the Dunia 2 engine such as ray tracing support on the PC version, and support for AMD's open source variable resolution technology, FidelityFX Super Resolution. Aside from the main entries in the Far Cry series, the Dunia 2 engine is also used in the spin-off games. These include Far Cry 3: Blood Dragon, Far Cry Primal, and Far Cry New Dawn.

==== Snowdrop ====
The Snowdrop game engine was co-developed by Massive Entertainment and Ubisoft for Tom Clancy's The Division. The core of the game engine is powered by a "node-based system" which simplifies the process of connecting different systems like rendering, AI, mission scripting and the user interface. The engine is also used in other Ubisoft games such as South Park: The Fractured but Whole, Mario + Rabbids: Kingdom Battle, Starlink: Battle for Atlas, Avatar: Frontiers of Pandora, and Star Wars Outlaws.

== Games ==
According to Guillemot, Ubisoft recognised that connected sandbox games, with seamless switches between single and multiplayer modes provided the players with more fun, leading the company to switch from pursuing single-player only games to internet connected ones. According to Guillemot, Ubisoft internally refers to its reimagined self as 'before The Division' and an 'after The Division'.

In an interview with The Verge, Anne Blondel-Jouin, executive producer of The Crew turned vice-president of live operations, noted that The Crew was an early game of Ubisoft's to require a persistent internet connection in order to play. This raised concerns for gamers and internally at the company.

== Additional media ==
=== Film and television ===
In 1999, 12 years before the founding of Ubisoft Film & Television, a 3D animated Rayman series known as Rayman: The Animated Series was produced to help promote Rayman 2: The Great Escape, which was released the same year. The series was produced in-house by Ubisoft. In 2011, Ubisoft initiated its Ubisoft Film & Television division (then named Ubisoft Motion Pictures). Initially developing media works tied to Ubisoft's games, it has since diversified to other works including about video games. Productions include the live-action film Assassin's Creed (2016) and the series Rabbids Invasion (2013–2022) and Mythic Quest (2020–2025).

=== Educational content ===
Ubisoft has been partnering with various museums to help bring the research and modeling that has been done for games in the Assassins Creed and Far Cry series as part of museum exhibits. This extends from the addition of Discovery Tours in the Assassins Creed games, which allowed players to explore the games' world without other gameplay aspects.

== Litigation ==
=== Other lawsuits ===
- In 2008, Ubisoft sued Optical Experts Manufacturing (OEM), a DVD duplication company for $25 million plus damages for the leak and distribution of the PC version of Assassin's Creed. The lawsuit claims that OEM did not take proper measures to protect its product as stated in its contract with Ubisoft. The complaint alleges that OEM admitted to all the problems in the complaint.
- In April 2012, Ubisoft was sued by John L. Beiswenger, the author of the book Link who alleged copyright infringement for using his ideas in the Assassin's Creed franchise. He demanded $5.25 million in damages and a halt to the release of Assassin's Creed III which was set to be released in October 2012, along with any future games that allegedly contain his ideas. On 30 May 2012, Beiswenger dropped the lawsuit. Beiswenger was later quoted as saying he believes "authors should vigorously defend their rights in their creative works", and suggested that Ubisoft's motion to block future lawsuits from Beiswenger hints at its guilt.
- In December 2014, Ubisoft offered a free game from its catalogue of recently released titles to compensate the season pass owners of Assassin's Creed Unity due to its buggy launch. The terms offered with the free game revoked the user's right to sue Ubisoft for the buggy launch of the game.
- In May 2020, Ubisoft sued Chinese developer Ejoy and Apple and Google over Ejoy's Area F2 game which Ubisoft contended was a carbon copy of Tom Clancy's Rainbow Six Siege. Ubisoft sought copyright action against Ejoy, and financial damages against Apple and Google for allowing Area F2 to be distributed on their mobile app stores and profiting from its microtransactions.
- In November 2024, two Californians—Matthew Cassell and Alan Liu—filed a class action lawsuit against Ubisoft in the United States District Court for the Eastern District of California, after Ubisoft announced the shutdown of The Crew servers. Cassell and Liu accused the company of misleading players into believing that their purchases of the game were permanent instead of buying limited licenses and for "falsely represent[ing]" that the physical copies contained the game's files instead of simply a key to unlock the DRM for the game.
- In January 2026, former Ubisoft worker Marc-Alexis Côté said he will sue the company for CAD 1.3 Million over a forced exit from the company. He claimed he was replaced and that he learned in the summer of 2025 it was looking for a new boss for the Assassin's Creed franchise, he was told the role was not to be based in Canada and instead in France, the lawsuit allegedly claimed that he was offered a "Head of Production" role, Ubisoft told him not to go to work on 13 October, a day before he was departed, his lawsuit also asks for 75K$ CAD in damages and severance pay
- In April 2026, French consumer group UFC-Que Choisir with support from Stop Killing Games sued Ubisoft over the shutdown of The Crew, asserting Ubisoft misled consumers on the permanence of availability for the game.
