= Release Me =

Release Me may refer to:

== Albums ==
- Release Me (Barbra Streisand album), 2012
- Release Me (The Like album) or the title song, 2010
- Release Me (Lyle Lovett album) or the title song, 2012
- Release Me (Micah Stampley album), 2010
- Release Me, by Engelbert Humperdinck, 1967

== Songs ==
- "Release Me" (1949 song), written by Eddie Miller and Robert Yount; recorded by many artists
- "Release Me" (Agnes song), 2008
- "Release Me" (Deborah Conway song), 1992
- "Release Me" (Hooverphonic song), 2020
- "Release Me" (Oh Laura song), 2007
- "Release Me" (Wilson Phillips song), 1990
- "Release Me" (Zoë Badwi song), 2008
- "Release Me", by Jack's Mannequin from People and Things, 2011
- "Release Me", by Mae from Singularity, 2007
- "Release Me", by Miki Howard from Femme Fatale, 1992
- "Release Me", by Oh Land from Fauna, 2008
- "Release Me", by Tonic from Tonic, 2010

== Other uses ==
- "Release me! release me!", a quotation said by Joseph Seed from the video game Far Cry New Dawn.
