= Pagan Min (Far Cry) =

Video game antagonist

- Far Cry character
- First appearance: Far Cry 4 (2014)
- Created by: Ubisoft
- Voiced by: Troy Baker; Daniel York Loh (Captain Laserhawk: A Blood Dragon Remix)

In-universe information
- Family: Gang Min (father); Yuma Lau (adoptive sister)
- Significant other: Ishwari Ghale (lover)
- Children: Lakshmana Min (daughter)
- Origin: Hong Kong

Pagan Min is a fictional character from Ubisoft's Far Cry video game franchise. He first appears as the primary antagonist of the 2014 title, Far Cry 4, and was extensively featured in promotional material for the game. In Far Cry 4, he is a foreign interloper who usurped the rule of Kyrat, a fictional Himalayan country, following a protracted series of civil wars. As the self-styled King of Kyrat, Min is opposed by the Golden Path, a rebel movement fighting to liberate Kyrat from Min's rule. The character has made further appearances in downloadable content (DLC) for the 2021 title, Far Cry 6, as well as its comic book tie-in Far Cry: Rite of Passage, and the 2023 animated series Captain Laserhawk: A Blood Dragon Remix.

Like Vaas Montenegro, one of the main villains from the preceding Far Cry 3, Pagan Min's character arc in the narrative of Far Cry 4 was written to encourage players to think about the path their actions have led them as well as the resulting consequences. Unlike Vaas however, Min presents himself as an eloquent and sophisticated individual. He is portrayed through performance capture by American actor Troy Baker. Baker's audition for Pagan Min, where he improvised dialogue for the character by violently threatening a crew member as if they are another in-game character, impressed the development team so much that he was hired for the role on that basis. Baker was given a considerable amount of creative freedom to develop Min's personality.

The character initially attracted controversy and accusations of racist imagery following the unveiling of the game's cover art in mid-2014, which shows the light-skinned Pagan Min resting his hand on a dark-skinned individual. The character has received a generally positive reception following the release of Far Cry 4, with critics praising Baker’s performance, as well as lauding Min as a memorable antagonist and an essential element of the Far Cry franchise's identity with its emphasis on villainous characters.

== Character overview ==
Pagan Min is presented as a confident and outwardly charming character, who is also brash and prone to violent outbursts. According to the character's backstory disclosed by Ubisoft staff, Pagan Min is not the character's birth name: within series lore, he is originally Gang Min, the son of a mid-level drug trafficking crime boss based in Hong Kong. Min worked for his father as he grew up, but the conflict would escalate between father and son: the ambitious Min grew to resent his father as well as his contemporaries as "dinosaurs" or obsolete relics of the past, and on a personal level he is ostracized by his father due to his flamboyant nature and mixed heritage, a source of shame among the city-state's criminal elite.

According to Far Cry 4 narrative director Mark Thompson, Min took the name of a historical Burmese king from the 19th century after the death of his father, because he did not want to say that he killed his own father, but named himself after the man who did. Min changed the pronunciation to be western to assert his identity as unique. He then assumed control of his family’s modest fortunes to acquire considerable assets and assemble a small private army to make a grab for power and dominance within the Golden Triangle, a geographical location between Myanmar, Laos and Thailand known for being one of the world’s largest regions of opium production. Min's downfall came when his father's allies attempted to assassinate him, forcing him to flee to Kyrat by 1987 and seek refuge there while it was in the midst of a civil war between the Royalists, who sought to keep the Kyrati monarchy, and the Nationalists, who sought a republic. Driven by delusions of grandeur and hubris, a 21-year-old Pagan Min participated in the conflict on the arrogant belief that he could save the country from its status as a failed state, and brought a child emperor to restore the recently massacred royal family, before murdering him and taking the throne for himself. He rules Kyrat through a "toxic mixture of personal charm, relentless propaganda, criminal sponsorship, and brutality". Pagan Min consistently wears a brightly colored suit, variously described as pink or magenta, as a homage to his unnamed mother, who was a British-Hong Konger.

== Concept and design ==
Designed by the development team at Ubisoft Montreal, Pagan Min was envisioned to be a surprising character who is not what he seems at first. The team originally wanted to design a villain that had a "punk-rock mentality" and is representative of "a new generation of criminal who would piss off his father". A character concept that was proposed early in development involved an eccentric military dictator, styled after the Libyan leader Muammar Gaddafi, who would award himself fake ribbons as prizes. The team ultimately abandoned the idea as they felt that the visual style they had conceived for the character was "cool" but lacked originality, though they still sought inspiration for the character's personality in "charismatic but unstable warlords" like the Liberian military leader Joshua Milton Blahyi, otherwise known as "General Butt Naked". This is based on the notion that extreme characters like Pagan Min seem sane within their universe, but when taken out of context and placed in the real world, they seem very insane. The final version of Pagan Min incorporates inspiration from Takeshi Kitano's character from Brother, and Kakihara, a character from Ichi the Killer. A common trait shared by both of the aforementioned characters are the vibrant colored suits they wear, that helped them stand out from the crowd visually. This inspired the team's concept artists to give Min a bright pink suit as his signature outfit, which also motivated Thompson and the game's writers to come up with a more interesting backstory for Min, as they realized that it did not measure up to the interesting visuals developed for the character by the game's artists.

In comparison to Vaas Montenegro, a villainous character whose popularity helped set the tone of Far Cry as a video game franchise that emphasizes its antagonists as a key aspect of its identity, game director Patrik Méthé considered Pagan Min to be more subtle, clever, and intelligent than the "raw" Vaas. Producer Dan Hay likens Pagan Min to "that friend that everybody has that is really bad for them, that friend who is super dangerous" due to his charm and intellect. Méthé said the team's goal was to convincingly portray Min as a psychotic but charming villain who could hold the attention of the player through his well-spoken mannerisms. Creative Director of Far Cry 4 Alex Hutchinson felt that Vaas' limited screen time in Far Cry 3 was a missed opportunity as he disappeared from the narrative relatively quickly. He claimed that a consensus from the development team decided that Far Cry 4 should focus on the villain as much as the hero, and so Min became a much bigger part of the game when contrasted with Vaas' role in the preceding title. Pagan Min's backstory, as well as that of Kyrat, is inspired by the real-world history of Nepal, in particular the turbulent years of the Nepalese Civil War and its subsequent transition from a monarchy to a republic.

The developers wanted to portray a complex relationship between Pagan Min and the player character, Ajay Ghale. Wanting players to guess Min's intentions and add a layer of mystery to him, Ubisoft staff shared teasers and hints of a past connection between Ajay and him in pre-release interviews about Far Cry 4. Hutchinson said Min is a peacock-like tin-pot dictator who wants power and is driven by selfish desires, but also noted that the player characters of many Far Cry titles are in fact not that different since they impose themselves in the environment and commit to a cause of stopping a murderer by murdering people themselves. In this regard, Min serves as the mirror and a reflection of the player's behavior through his constant questioning of Ajay on why he is in Kyrat and what his intended purpose is, a deliberate approach to have the player question their character's own motivations.

Hutchison acknowledged that it is hard to present a believable villain who does not feel "paper thin or artificial" due to the nature of the video game medium, and so the team opted to give Far Cry 4 a branching narrative with various different endings and alternate moments which is intended to respond to any questions that the player might have. To demonstrate that Ajay's relationship with Min had a degree of flexibility from the very beginning of the game and that he is responsive to any available choices a player could make, the player has the option to make a game-altering decision by choosing to obey Min's instructions or otherwise during its opening sequence. Hutchison wanted to subvert a common notion that video game characters often lie to the player character by ensuring that the decision made by any player who obeys Min's instructions during the opening sequence should be paid off because he is telling the truth. Subsequent sequels have featured similarly-themed alternate endings, which allow players to quickly complete the game by choosing not to escalate the conflict with their respective antagonists.

=== Portrayal ===
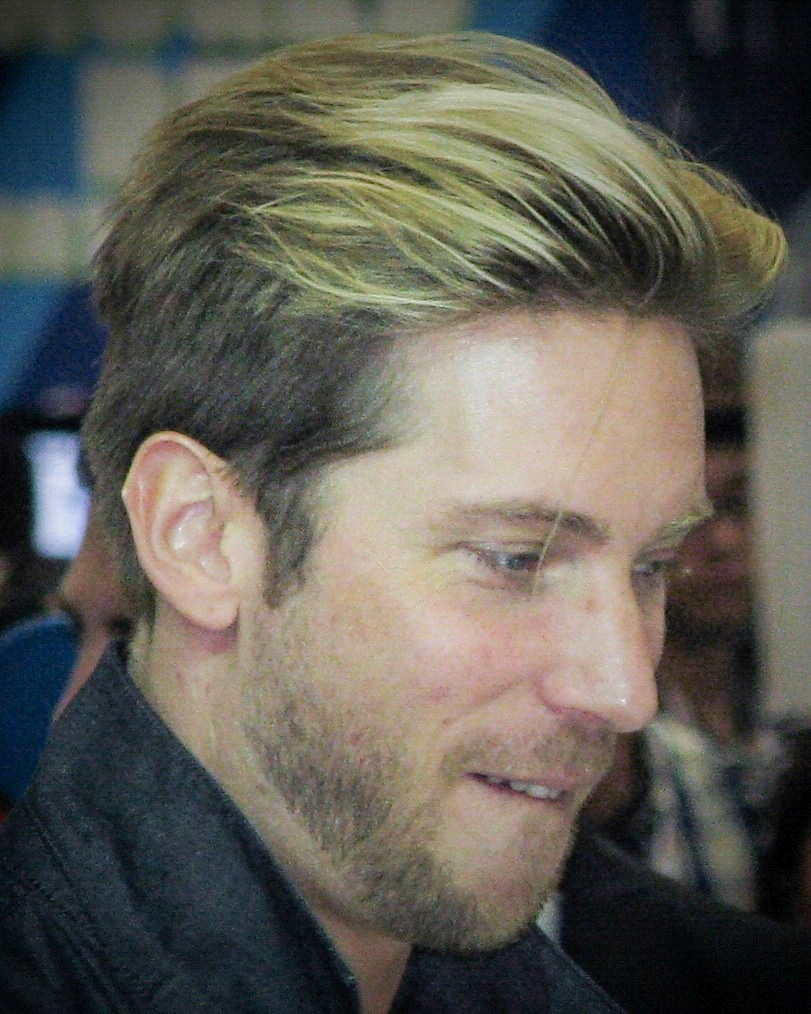
Troy Baker in 2013. Pagan Min is one of Baker's most notable roles.

Pagan Min is portrayed by American actor Troy Baker through performance capture. He was provided with a script for the audition, but he chose not to follow it. When he noticed a production assistant walking into the audition room partway through a scene, he spontaneously invited the assistant to participate in the scene using Min's voice. Encouraged by the fact that no one else broke character and out of his desire to maintain the visceral atmosphere of a Far Cry game, Baker carried on with the scene and ad-libbed a monologue where he switched from a charming tone to a sadistic one and threatened to cut off the assistant's face. Aware of the growing enthusiasm expressed by the interviewing team members towards his performance by this point, he then made a specific threat to put the remains of her face on his own for a "glorious makeover". The team was sufficiently impressed with Baker and his charismatic voice that they decided to cast him for the role.

Baker credited his previous work and reputation as an actor for Ubisoft's willingness to not only let him deviate from the script during the audition but also to grant him a significant amount of creative freedom to develop Pagan Min's personality. Although he did draw on the length and breadth of his experience as a professional actor up to that point in time, Baker noted that there was also an opportunity to build off the successes of previous games in the franchise by identifying the elements which resonated with critics and players. To avoid a common trope of what Baker described as "another mustache-twirling systemic obstacle in the path of the player character", Ubisoft had several discussions with him about delivering a fresh and compelling take character-wise for Pagan Min, while still incorporating the principles that worked for previous games. The team gave Baker an overall idea for the theme, setting, and tone they want to see, but encouraged a collaborative approach where he would continue immersing himself in the game world and provide both positive and negative feedback from his experiences. Although Baker had some parameters set for him, including a specific request that he does not reprise the same style and voice he used for the Joker in 2013's Batman: Arkham Origins, his preparation for the character was minimalistic in nature as he continued the same improvisational approach he used during his audition.

Baker would perform his role as Pagan Min on a motion capture stage which is empty aside from stacked boxes and wooden props, and he would have to visualize other in-game characters and objects in his mind when reciting the character's dialogue. Baker said he would "choose the word antagonist" to describe Pagan Min as he does not believe that he is in fact a villain. In his view, Min is caring and benevolent if somewhat temperamental, and all he wants to be within the narrative of Far Cry 4 is a good king. The alternative ending presented to the player in the game's opening sequence, which Baker described as a canonical set of events "that still leads to the same point, just a different version of it" if the player just does what Min asks them to do, is an unusual creative decision not found in most games as it effectively flips Ajay's story and he becomes the villain of his own story in Baker's view. Reflecting on the role when speaking to IGN staff, Baker is confident that Pagan Min would come to be regarded as "one of the most memorable villains to ever be in a video game". One moment that stood out to him was the shooting of the opening cutscene, specifically a line uttered by Pagan Min as he gets up to a helicopter because he could visualize all of its elements in vivid detail at the time.

== Appearances ==
=== Far Cry 4 ===
Pagan Min first appears during the opening minutes of Far Cry 4, when he arrives via helicopter to greet protagonist Ajay Ghale following the latter's arrival in Kyrat via bus. Finding that his men have detained and shot up the bus, Min confronts the commander who ordered the attack, and brutally murders him with a ballpoint pen. He then turns on a smile in almost an instant for a selfie opportunity with Ajay, whom he calls his "guest of honor" and brings him to the stronghold of his general Paul "De Pleur" Harmon for a meal of crab rangoon. During dinner, Min reveals that he had heard the news of Ajay's arrival and ordered his soldiers to stop the bus so that he could meet him in person, but did not expect Ajay to be detained and harassed. Min then enthusiastically talks about Ajay's deceased mother, Ishwari, whom Min had personally known and whose ashes are carried by Ajay in an urn. After torturing a detained rebel who is also present at the table, Min abruptly leaves after a subordinate asks for his presence to deal with rebel forces, but not before telling Ajay to wait at the table until he returns. If the player obeys Min's instructions to wait at the dinner table until he returns, the game will end with Ajay enjoying a peaceful meal with Min. Otherwise, Ajay escapes from the palace and gets involved with the Golden Path, an armed Kyrati rebel movement formed by Ajay's father Mohan Ghale that opposes Min's rule.

Min is depicted as omnipresent throughout the game world of Far Cry 4 without being personally visible: examples include his radio monologues or effigies crafted in his image found around Kyrat. He is established to have attempted to destroy any sense of the nation's religious beliefs due to his desire to bring Kyrat into the modern era, whilst also making profits via the production of drugs and slave labor. His royal army is led by his second-in-command and adopted sister Yuma, whilst the rest of Kyrat is controlled by his lieutenants De Pleur, an American desk jockey with sadistic tendencies, and Noore Naijar, a former doctor whose family was kidnapped by De Pleur and who runs Shanath Arena, where the citizens of Kyrat bet on who will survive fights to the death.

Min's speeches, as well as pages from Mohan Ghale's journal, gradually reveal who Min is and where he came from, as well as the history of Kyrat and why Ajay is in the country, namely that he was a member of the Triads and helped Mohan fight off nationalists during a civil war, before taking the opportunity to usurp the monarchy. In the ensuing war between Mohan and Pagan, Mohan sent his wife Ishwari as a spy to infiltrate Pagan's kingdom, only for her to genuinely fall in love with him. During the narrative, Pagan routinely makes radio calls to Ajay, warning him of the consequences of his actions. He later appears after Ajay is betrayed by CIA agent Willis Huntley, having kidnapped Ajay and left him in Yuma's care, which he describes as giving Ajay "tough love". During one mission, Ajay assassinates who he believes to be Min, but the individual later turns out to be a political decoy. Shortly after, Min makes a public speech on television, in which he praises Yuma's fights against the rebels and challenges them further. In actuality, the speech is an excuse for Min to publicly reveal Yuma's location to the rebels and have her killed; Yuma was intending to overthrow Pagan due to believing he has become a weak shadow of himself due to his love for Ishwari.

At the end of the narrative, after capturing De Pleur, killing Noore and Yuma, and liberating Kyrat from Pagan's control, the player gets to choose whether Min lives or dies. If Ajay doesn't kill him, Pagan reveals that Lakshamana, the place where Ishwari asked her ashes to be spread, was actually Pagan and Ishwari's daughter, whom Mohan killed, leading to Ishwari killing Mohan in turn. He confesses that after their deaths, he was driven insane, using their deaths as an excuse to indulge his worst tendencies, which he compares to Ajay, whom he believes has used his mother's ashes only as an excuse to commit horrendous crimes. After Ajay places his mother's ashes next to Lakshamana's, Pagan leaves Kyrat and leaves it in Ajay's hands. The player then has the option to destroy Pagan's helicopter, after which they can loot his corpse.

=== Far Cry 6 ===
Pagan Min makes his first appearance as a playable character in Pagan: Control, a post-launch expansion for the 2021 title Far Cry 6, which was released on January 11, 2022. Control begins in a dream sequence, where Min is having dinner with his lover, Ishwari Ghale, and her children, Ajay and Lakshmana. An apparition of Min, dubbed "the Tyrant", appears and kills Lakshmana, then shoots Min. He wakes up later and follows the voice of Lakshmana who guides him back to the Ghale family as he explores his past memories, trying to hide his mistakes while collecting pieces of a mask and fighting apparitions of the Tyrant, Yuma Lau, Ajay and his father Mohan and the Golden Path soldiers. He eventually reunites with the Ghale family, but the Tyrant unleashes one final attack, forcing Min to defend them. In the end, Lakshmana convinces Min to leave the dream and come to terms with her and Ishwari's deaths. An audio recording of Pagan plays afterward, in which he reveals to Ajay that he invested Kyrat's resources into a stockpile of nuclear weapons as retaliation for the United States meddling in his affairs, adding that the weapons were pointed towards "somewhere in Montana". With Min now gone from Kyrat, he instructs Ajay to use the weapons as he sees fit.

Pagan Min appears in a 2021 tie-in comic series titled Far Cry: Rite of Passage published by Dark Horse Comics, which sees Far Cry 6 villain Antón Castillo recounting cautionary tales to his son Diego, one of which involves an account of Pagan Min's backstory. Castillo retells the story of the manner in which Pagan Min rose to power after taking control of his father's criminal organization, the Triad Empire, and how he was forced to flee Hong Kong for Kyrat when the organization lost structure and eventually turned on him. A reimagined version of Pagan Min appears in the second episode of the 2023 animated series Captain Laserhawk: A Blood Dragon Remix, voiced by Daniel York Loh.

== Promotion and reception ==
Ubisoft released several promotional trailers and video interviews which featured Pagan Min to promote Far Cry 4. A special Kyrat Edition for Far Cry 4 includes a figurine of Pagan Min, a collector's box, a poster, a journal, a map of Kyrat, and the missions from the Limited Edition. Pagan Min's status as the dictator of Kyrat was later referenced on the promotional website for 2016's Far Cry Primal, which contained in-universe blog posts attributed to Divya Kandala, a reporter character within the Far Cry universe.

Pagan Min's depiction on the cover art of Far Cry 4 following its initial reveal provoked controversy, particularly with commentators on social media who denounced the image of a blond light-skinned man dominating a kneeling dark-skinned man as racist, and this despite Pagan Min being clearly and unapologetically a villain. Some commentators as well as Mark Thompson himself suggested that this was partly due to disapproval in response to the storyline of Far Cry 3, which many interpreted to be a white savior narrative. Hutchinson later responded and clarified by saying that Pagan Min is not a white person, and that the other individual depicted is not the game's protagonist. Hutchinson added that the reaction of the community regarding the cover art was "uncomfortable". Nathan Grayson from Kotaku criticized Ubisoft's handling of the public outcry for its failure to communicate accurate information about Pagan Min clearly and in a timely manner with the general public, and cited the instance as an example of the video game medium having difficulty coming into its own as a culturally powerful force. Speculation began circulating on the internet following a gameplay demonstration showcase at E3 2014 that Pagan Min is in fact the father of Ajay, though Hutchinson debunked rumors of the supposed plot twist not long afterwards.

Pagan Min's reception following the launch of Far Cry 4 was generally positive, with many critics praising Baker for his memorable performance as the character. Pagan Min was considered for the Outstanding Achievement in Character award at the 18th Annual D.I.C.E. Awards. For his work as Pagan Min, Baker was nominated for the Best Performer Award at the 11th British Academy Video Games Awards. Brian Altano from IGN called Min "a brilliantly written villain who is equal parts extravagant and psychotic" and a key element in bringing all of the game's disparate elements together. Dale Driver, also from IGN, said Min has earned his place in the "bad guy hall of fame" alongside Vaas as well as Joseph Seed from Far Cry 5 and its direct sequel Far Cry: New Dawn. Driver noted that while Pagan Min is not nearly as beloved as Vaas, he is representative of a trend where the role of the villain has become increasingly important to the identity of the Far Cry series and still received widespread acclaim from critics and fans. Polygon ranked Pagan Min among the best video game characters of the 2010s, with Colin Campbell praising him as the most "colorful and disturbing" of the psychotic, charismatic villains the Far Cry series is known for. Chris Carter from Destructoid lauded Pagan Min's presence, as he takes the spotlight every time he appears in the game. On the other hand, Steven Burns from Videogamer.com said Min's minimal appearances throughout the story of Far Cry 4 is an important contribution to its narrative success. Ian Walker of Kotaku felt that while Min is embellished with an "aristocratic flair that added a layer of charisma to the menace", the character never quite lived up to Vaas' legacy.

A noteworthy fan mod for the 4X video game Civilization V adds the nation of Kyrat, led by Pagan Min, as a playable faction or tribe.
