= Far Cry 6 =

2021 video game

- Cover art featuring antagonist Antón Castillo standing behind his son Diego
- Developer: Ubisoft Toronto (Note: Additional work by Ubisoft Montreal, Ubisoft Kyiv, Ubisoft Berlin, Ubisoft Shanghai, Ubisoft Philippines, Ubisoft Bucharest, Ubisoft Pune, Ubisoft Odesa, Ubisoft Winnipeg, Ubisoft Montpellier and Ubisoft Quebec)
- Publisher: Ubisoft
- Directors: Omar Bouali; Alexandre Letendre
- Producer: Rima Brek
- Designer: Ted Timmins
- Programmers: Olivier Rouleau; Christian Carriere
- Artists: Denny Borges; Marco Beauchemin
- Writer: Navid Khavari
- Composer: Pedro Bromfman
- Series: Far Cry
- Engine: Dunia 2
- Platforms: PlayStation 4; PlayStation 5; Stadia; Windows; Xbox One; Xbox Series X/S
- Release: October 7, 2021
- Genre: First-person shooter
- Modes: Single-player, multiplayer

Far Cry 6 is a 2021 open world first-person shooter game developed by Ubisoft Toronto and published by Ubisoft. It is the sixth main installment in the Far Cry series and the successor to 2018's Far Cry 5. The game is set on the fictional Caribbean island of Yara, ruled as a dictatorship by "El Presidente" Antón Castillo (portrayed by Giancarlo Esposito), who is raising his son Diego (Anthony Gonzalez) to follow in his rule. Players take on the role of guerrilla fighter Dani Rojas (voiced by either Nisa Gunduz or Sean Rey), attempting to topple Castillo and his regime. Gameplay focuses on combat and exploration; players battle enemy soldiers and dangerous wildlife using a wide array of weapons and gadgets. The game features numerous elements commonly found in role-playing games, such as a leveling-up system and side quests. It also features a cooperative multiplayer mode.

Development of Far Cry 6 began around 2016 and was extensive. The team studied several revolutions of recent history for the game's narrative, primarily the Cuban Revolution of 1953–1959. Castillo was based on the real life dictator Fulgencio Batista in Cuba. The game was designed to be "political", covering themes such as the rise of fascism in a nation, the costs of imperialism, and the need for free and fair elections, in reaction to the controversy generated by Far Cry 5. The development team also sought to bring back several elements from earlier Far Cry titles such as a tropical setting and a fully-voiced protagonist. The game was first teased by Esposito in July 2020, and officially announced later that month, at the Ubisoft Forward online event.

Far Cry 6 was released worldwide for PlayStation 4, PlayStation 5, Stadia, Windows, Xbox One and Xbox Series X/S on October 7, 2021. It received mixed reviews from critics, who praised the small improvements brought to the series' gameplay formula, but criticized its story and lack of innovation. Several releases of downloadable content were subsequently published, including three expansion packs centered around antagonists from past Far Cry games.

== Gameplay ==
Far Cry 6 features first-person shooter gameplay similar to the previous entries. In this gameplay screenshot the player engages in combat with an enemy non-playable character.

Similar to the previous entries in the series, Far Cry 6 is a first-person shooter game, set in an open world environment navigable on foot or via various land, water, and air vehicles. Players assume the role of a local rebel named Dani Rojas, a former conscript in the military turned into a guerrilla fighter, whose gender they can select at the start of the game. The world is divided into seven main regions with an array of terrain, ranging from urban areas and dense jungles, to mountain ranges and open oceans. Gameplay focuses on armed and close-quarters combat. Players are able to use a wide array of conventional weapons (such as sidearms, assault rifles, submachine guns, shotguns, light-machine guns, sniper rifles and grenade launchers). Firearms can be customized using materials found throughout the world.

In a new addition to the series, the game features several prototypes of special weaponry, called "Resolver weapons", each offering a certain perk to the player's loadout, for example a silent close-range nailgun or a sling-shot projectile weapon which fires CDs. Another new addition is the "Supremo" backpacks, allowing augmentation of the playstyle by assigning more perks to the player's loadout, such as firing homing missiles or seeing enemies through solid objects. Unlike the previous titles in the series, players are able to holster weapons; as a result, enemy NPCs will not attack the player on sight, unless within restricted areas.

The game introduces a "Rank Level" system which indicates the player's rank and highlights the level of a specific region. As the game progresses and the player explores more of the world, enemy forces will be equipped with more powerful gear and target locations become more heavily fortified. Like previous games in the series, outposts are scattered throughout the world, allowing the player to kill or neutralize the enemy presence to reduce the dominance of forces in a particular area. The game also implements a new notoriety and reputation-style gameplay mechanic. If a high notoriety level is earned, as a result of actions taken against enemy NPCs for example, the player will be hunted by special forces. The notoriety meter can be reduced by fleeing combat and staying hidden for a specific period of time.

The player has the ability to construct and upgrade guerrilla bases called "Camp Facilities", which provide useful resources and in-game bonuses to increase the skillset of the character, specialize perks in hunting animals, unlock fast travel locations throughout Yara, enlist new recruits and manage their equipment, or launch friendly NPC operations. The game's version of Far Cry 5's "Fangs for Hire" companion system returns, called "Amigos", which features recruitable animals with a variety of abilities and perks tasked to assist the player in combat and exploration.

== Plot ==
Far Cry 6 takes place in 2021 in Yara, a fictional Caribbean island nation inspired by Cuba ruled by the dictator Antón Castillo (Giancarlo Esposito). In 1967, a guerrilla revolution topples the regime of Antón's father, leading to Yara's isolation from the rest of the world. Following the nation's collapse, Antón becomes a political prisoner. In 2019, Antón is elected president and oversees the creation of Viviro, a new cancer treatment developed from Yara's tobacco, promising it will stabilize the nation's economy. Two years later, Antón announces a draft "lottery" to conscript citizens as farmers in the tobacco fields. Antón has a 13-year-old son, Diego (Anthony Gonzalez), whom he grooms to be his successor.

In the capital Esperanza, as Yara's armed forces round up citizens for the draft, Dani Rojas prepares to escape to the American city of Miami via fishing boat, alongside friends Lita Torres and Alejo Ruiz. Alejo is shot and killed after provoking troops in the street, while Dani and Lita flee to the awaiting boat filled with other refugees and escape. However, Antón stops the boat and reveals that Diego was attempting to flee with them. After retrieving Diego, he orders the boat sunk by gunfire. Dani survives the commotion and wakes up with a mortally wounded Lita on an island's beach, far away from Esperanza. As Lita dies, she urges Dani to look for the nearby Clara Garcia, leader of the guerilla movement Libertad. Upon arrival, Clara tells Dani to invite ex-spymaster and weapon maker Juan Cortez back into Libertad, disrupt the Fuerzas Nacionales de Defensa (FND) forces on the island, and clear the blockade trapping the guerrillas in the region. Once Dani fulfills all the tasks, Clara gives Dani a boat to flee Yara. If Dani does not leave, Clara gives the order to aid anti-Castillo forces throughout Yara's three major regions—Madrugada, Valle de Oro, and El Este—and convince them to help Libertad oust Antón.

In Madrugada, Dani searches for the revered Montero family, who are allied with the region's guerrillas and tobacco workers. They take down General José Castillo—Antón's nephew, commander of Yara's air force, and a slave driver who robbed the Monteros and other local farmers of their lands to grow the Viviro tobacco. Over in Valle de Oro, Dani assists the rap band Máximas Matanzas in airing TV and radio performances to push back against pro-Castillo propaganda spread by María Marquessa, Yara's Minister of Culture and Diego's mother. Upon killing María during a televised interview about Viviro, they encounter Dr. Edgar Reyes, the scientist behind Viviro's conception; it is revealed that he performed cruel experiments on disenfranchised tobacco workers in concentration camps as part of his effort to create the drug. With this in mind, Dani goes to one of his research facilities and kills him. Meanwhile, in El Este, a man known as "El Tigre" awaits Dani's arrival on top of a mountain hideout housing the Legends of ‘67, the veteran revolutionaries who overthrew Antón's father. While he is willing to help Libertad, the others are not, so Dani shows them photos of poor working conditions in tobacco farms to convince them to join. While attempting this, Dani comes across an anarchist rebel group of university students known as La Moral who are fighting against Yara's naval commander Admiral Benítez. The two groups unite and storm Benítez's fort to kill her, ending her iron-fisted rule on Yara's seas. They then track down Sean McKay, a Canadian business magnate who handles Viviro exports and imports, and either kill him or make a deal with him to finance Libertad.

After uniting the anti-Castillo forces under the flag of Libertad, Dani learns that Antón is holding Clara at his private island's villa, under the pretense of a parley. When Dani confronts him, he and Diego reveal that Antón has been suffering from leukemia for 13 years, and the Viviro treatment stopped working 6 months earlier. Impressed by Dani's feats, and wishing that Diego has a protector for when he dies, Antón demands that Dani become his general in exchange for Clara's life. Juan attempts to assassinate Antón but opts to shoot Diego instead, though Dani knocks him out of the way. In reaction to the shooting, Antón kills Clara and escapes with Diego to Esperanza. Using Anton's private island as a staging ground, Dani leads an amphibious assault of Esperanza, with the backing of the newly united Libertad. While Libertad guerillas push the FND out of Esperanza, Dani enters Antón's presidential palace alone and confronts him in his office. Dani promises to protect Diego, but Antón, believing that Diego would instead be tortured as he had been after his father's toppling, fatally shoots Diego before committing suicide. The resistance forces unite with Dani and witness the Castillo corpses. They unanimously declare Dani the new leader of Yara, but Dani refuses the leadership, turning it over to them. After burying Clara, Dani and Juan wage war against Castillo's surviving loyalists.

An alternate ending occurs if Dani sails away from Yara before confronting Castillo. Dani will be shown three months later relaxing on a beach in Miami, with a news broadcast detailing how Castillo has consolidated his hold over Yara by crushing rebel forces and executing Clara.

== Development ==
For the first time, the game's development was led by Ubisoft Toronto, which had previously worked as a co-developer on previous games in the series. A total of 10 Ubisoft subsidiaries worked in the co development of the game including Ubisoft Montreal, Ubisoft Kyiv, Ubisoft Berlin, Ubisoft Shanghai, Ubisoft Philippines, Ubisoft Bucharest, Ubisoft Pune, Ubisoft Odessa, Ubisoft Winnipeg, Ubisoft Montpellier and Ubisoft Québec respectively. The advancement of the game took place in the middle of the COVID-19 pandemic, and was met with several constraints. The game runs on the Dunia 2 engine, with new features such as ray tracing support on the PC version and support for AMD's open source variable resolution technology, FidelityFX Super Resolution.

=== Gameplay design ===
The developers aimed to provide players with numerous choices in how they wish to experience the entire campaign, players being able to approach the story however they like. In contrast to the previous installment where the player is mute and interactions were limited, in this game, the protagonist is fully voiced, regarding this narrative director Navid Khavari, stated, "It was essential for us to ensure that the protagonist has a personal investment in that revolution." It is also the first game in the series to feature cut-scenes presented from a 3rd person perspective. As stated by Khavari, this helps players experience the story from a different angle since the main character is not present in those scenarios.

Takedown animations that were featured in previous editions but were scrapped in Far Cry 5 were restored. For the 'Guns for Hire,' humans were excluded from the game, and the focus was solely on animals. The development team scrapped the Map Editor and Arcade Mode, which were present in the previous instalments, instead they focused exclusively on improving the main campaign.

=== Setting, themes and influences ===
For the creation of Yara, the developers drew inspiration from various Caribbean nations, with Cuba being one of them. Khavari said that they started researching revolutions of the past, they came across the idea of the modern guerrilla revolution such as the Cuban Revolution, which gave them numerous ideas of how to drive the player-character into fighting against a repressive government. Khavari spent a month in Cuba, speaking to residents there to help develop the setting. Using Cuba as an influence also re-established the return to a tropical setting, a feature of the earlier Far Cry games, as well as giving the setting a "timeless" look due to economic blockades that had been imposed on the island, blending vintage cars with modern weapons. To achieve this, the developers studied the history, classic cars, and vibrant Caribbean colors.

This is a first for a Far Cry game to feature a major capital city that includes the antagonist's presidential palace. The game includes a large urban area and encompass a mix of open and closed buildings, offering rooftop runs, guerrilla paths through sewers, climbing, jumping, and gunfights in city streets. In terms of the environment, the development team drew inspiration directly from the Caribbean, which offers a wide range of biome variations. For the creation of trees, rocks, and foliage, the team took thousands of reference photos that are present on Caribbean islands. They built an extensive library of photogrammetry assets to ensure maximum realism when bringing the flora and fauna to life. The team analyzed color palettes in Cuba and endeavoured to understand how color is utilized in the country.

In contrast to the media controversy over Ubisoft distancing its stance that Far Cry 5 was made as a political statement, Khavari said that Far Cry 6 was "political", adding: "A story about a modern revolution must be". While the game's narrative element is based on stories around Cuba, Khavari stated that the game "doesn't want to make a political statement about what's happening in Cuba specifically", and does not attempt to make "a simplified, binary political statement specifically on the current political climate in Cuba". Khavari's family had experienced the Iranian Revolution in the late 1970s, eventually having fled to Canada, and using these experiences, those from Cuba, and from other research that Ubisoft had done, he wanted Far Cry 6 to have a story "about the conditions that lead to the rise of fascism in a nation, the costs of imperialism, forced labor, the need for free-and-fair elections, LGBTQ+ rights, and more."

=== Casting and characters ===
Word of a new Far Cry game was teased in early July 2020, as actor Giancarlo Esposito has mentioned he had recently taken part in a "huge video game", including voice work and motion capture. Shortly after this, rumoured leaks of Far Cry 6's existence appeared, including screens that showed a character resembling Esposito.

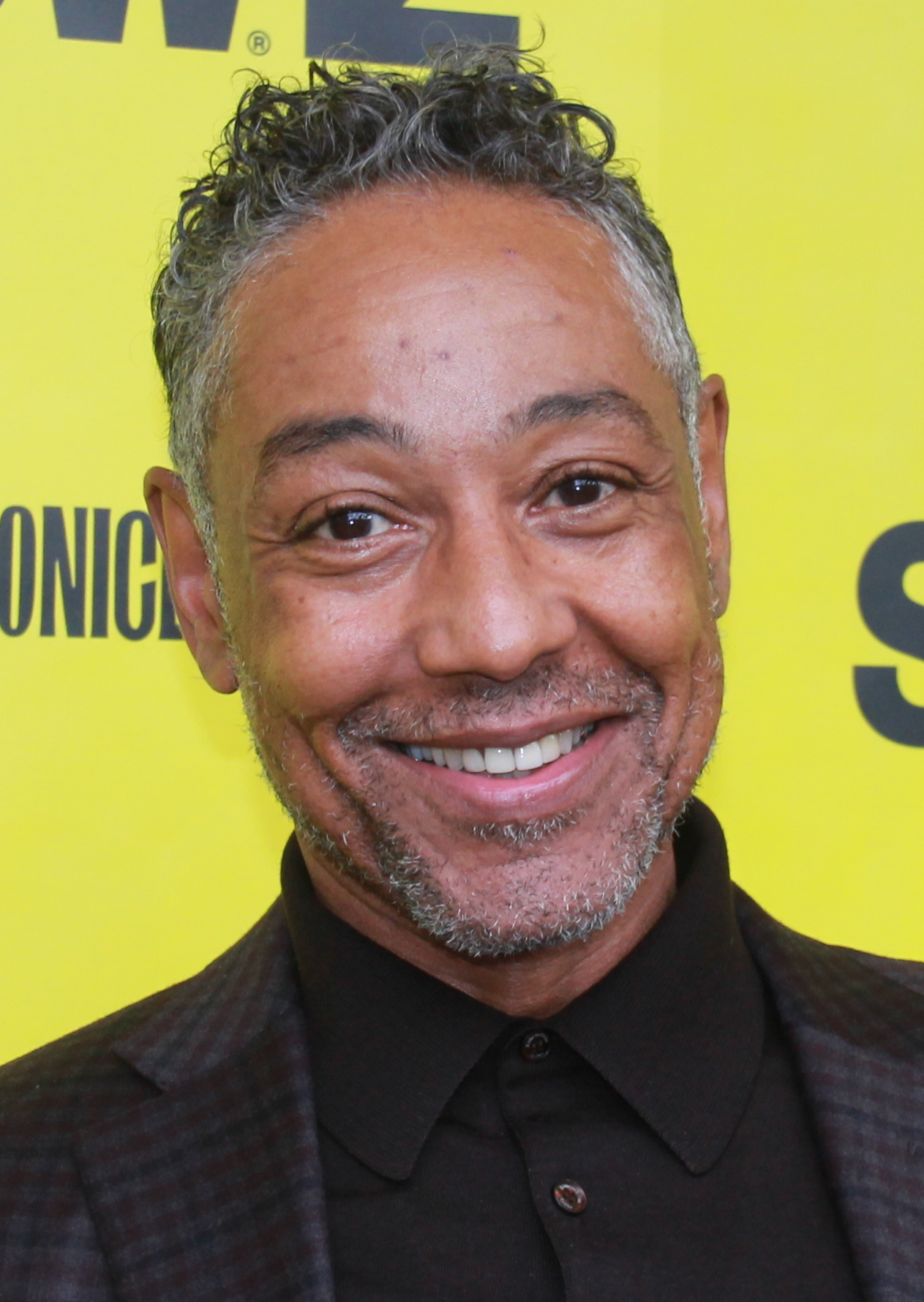
Antón Castillo incorporated Giancarlo Esposito's likeness, which was featured extensively as part of the marketing of Far Cry 6.

Anthony Gonzalez voices and provides the character model and motion capture for Diego. Esposito and Gonzalez had done the motion-capture and voice work for the game's trailer before shooting any of the footage for the game's narrative, as this gave the developers the time to create the character models for the game itself. For Esposito, he had been interested in the motion capture facets of the role, as he had done some for the cancelled Mouse Guard film and was interested in doing more, as well as his interest in the type of character that Ubisoft had created for him. Khavari said they had provided Esposito background material to help prepare before recording for the game, and upon these sessions, he found that Esposito had "done so much research already based on the material that we sent him. He brings an amazing empathy to his characters, and he brought that same empathy to Antón that I wasn't expecting."

=== Music ===
Pedro Bromfman composed the score for the game. The game's score consists of music that blends different elements, such as mixing Latin and Caribbean music. It also includes the use of a lot of Caribbean percussion. Regarding this, Bromfman stated, "It's a very unique score." Flamenco guitar, Cuban Tres, and Bolivian ronroco were used to accentuate the oppressive and somber narrative of the game.

== Release ==
Far Cry 6 was originally scheduled for release on February 18, 2021, on PlayStation 4, PlayStation 5, Stadia, Windows, Xbox One and Xbox Series X/S. On October 29, 2020, Ubisoft announced that the release would be delayed due to the ongoing COVID-19 pandemic. During Ubisoft's quarterly earnings call in February 2021, the company announced that the game would be released before September 30, 2021. As part of further gameplay reveals on May 28, 2021, Ubisoft also announced the planned release date for Far Cry 6 as October 7, 2021.

As part of the game's season pass, additional content includes story episodes letting the player take on the role of three antagonists from preceding Far Cry titles: Vaas Montenegro from Far Cry 3, Pagan Min from Far Cry 4, and Joseph Seed from Far Cry 5 and Far Cry New Dawn, with Michael Mando, Troy Baker, and Greg Bryk reprising their respective roles. In addition, the season pass comes with an updated version of Far Cry 3: Blood Dragon. Additional free content includes a guest appearance by Danny Trejo, a Rambo-inspired mission, and a crossover mission with Stranger Things.

A separate paid expansion titled Lost Between Worlds was released on December 6, 2022. In this expansion, Dani finds themselves stranded in a space between worlds after stumbling across an alien spaceship and an alien artificial intelligence named FAI.

== Reception ==
Reception

Aggregate scores
Aggregator	Score
Metacritic	(PC) 74/100 (PS5) 73/100 (XSXS) 79/100
OpenCritic	74% recommend

Review scores
Publication	Score
Destructoid	7.5/10
Easy Allies	8/10
Electronic Gaming Monthly	2/5
GameRevolution	6.5/10
GameSpot	7/10
GamesRadar+	4/5
Hardcore Gamer	4/5
IGN	8/10
PC Gamer (US)	74/100
PCGamesN	7/10
Push Square	7/10
Shacknews	8/10
VG247	4/5
VideoGamer.com	5/10

Far Cry 6 received "mixed or average" reviews from critics, while the Xbox Series X/S version received "generally favorable" reviews, according to review aggregator website Metacritic. Fellow review aggregator OpenCritic assessed that the game received strong approval, being recommended by 74% of critics.

An IGN review by Jon Ryan said that "Far Cry 6 smooths over a lot of the bumps that have cropped up in the past few games. Even though it misses some steps, especially with its new inventory system, it's the best the series has been in years." Destructoid's Jordan Devore wrote "Solid and definitely has an audience. There could be some hard-to-ignore faults, but the experience is fun."

Rachel Weber from GamesRadar+ wrote that "Far Cry 6 feels like the turning point for a series in transition. Everything you know and love about it is still there [...] but the small changes that have been made have a big impact on the overall experience", such as the main character being visible in cutscenes. Eurogamer outlined in their review: "There's plenty that's familiar about the latest entry in Ubisoft's open world shooter, but that doesn't stop it being a blast."

Conversely, Polygon's Diego Arguello said that Far Cry 6 "is a waste of potential", criticizing its Latin American stereotypes and feeling it fumbled any attempt at saying something meaningful despite the game's overt political theme, citing an instance "in which you rescue refugees by using a weapon that plays Macarena while you're aiming down its sights". Writing for Vice, Matthew Gault criticized and described the game as "creatively and morally bankrupt", noting his article "isn't a review" because he could not continue playing it. Screen Rant's Alex Santa Maria and Kotaku's Zack Zwiezen both criticized Far Cry 6 for being too similar to its predecessors. The game has also been criticized for including a cockfighting minigame.

=== Sales ===
In Japan, the PlayStation 4 version of Far Cry 6 was the second best-selling retail game during its first week of release, with 34,219 physical units being sold. The PlayStation 5 version sold 16,686 physical units in the same week, making it the third best-selling retail game in the country. It went on to become the 11th best-selling game in 2021 in the US.

=== Awards and accolades ===
Year	Award	Category	Result	Ref.
2021
2021	The Game Awards 2021	Best Performance (Giancarlo Esposito as Antón Castillo)	Nominated	
2021	The Game Awards 2021	Innovation in Accessibility	Nominated	
2021	The Game Awards 2021	Best Action Game	Nominated	
2022	20th Visual Effects Society Awards	Outstanding Animated Character in a Commercial ("Chicharrón")	Nominated	
2022	20th Visual Effects Society Awards	Outstanding Visual Effects in a Commercial ("Chicharrón Run")	Nominated	
2022	New York Game Awards 2022	Statue of Liberty Award for Best World	Nominated	
2022	New York Game Awards 2022	Tin Pan Alley Award for Best Music in a Game (Pedro Bromfman)	Nominated	
2022	New York Game Awards 2022	Great White Way Award for Best Acting in a Game (Giancarlo Esposito as Antón Castillo)	Nominated	
2022	New York Game Awards 2022	Great White Way Award for Best Acting in a Game (Michael Mando as Vaas Montenegro)	Nominated	
2022	33rd GLAAD Media Awards	Outstanding Video Game	Nominated	
