= Liam Wong =

Scottish photographer and games designer

Liam Wong is a Scottish photographer and games designer. He was Artistic Director of Ubisoft Montreal and was involved in the design of game series like Crysis and Far Cry. He is known for his cyberpunk, sci-fi style of photography. Wong is the author of the book To:ky:oo. He attended school at Stewarts Melville college.

== Biography ==
Wong is from Edinburgh, Scotland. He studied Computer Arts at Abertay University, Dundee, graduating in 2010. His first game, Colour-Coded, made in the final year of his degree was nominated for two BAFTA awards. He emigrated to Canada after graduating and became artistic director at Ubisoft Montreal, where he worked for six years. He bought his first DSLR camera in 2015, a Canon 5D mark III and, during a trip to Japan, started his Tokyo Nights series of photography, taking aesthetic influence from science fiction films like Blade Runner, Akira and Ghost in the Shell. He was named in Forbes 30 under 30 list in 2017. His debut photobook, To:ky:oo, is the most successful crowd funded book in the UK, having raised four times its intended target. In 2022 he joined Ikumi Nakamura's video game development studio: Unseen Inc. as visual director.

== Bibliography ==
- AFTER DARK (2022). Thames & Hudson, London.
- TO:KY:OO (2019). Thames & Hudson, London.

== Games ==
Title	Year	Company	Role	Ref.
Far Cry New Dawn	2019	Ubisoft	Artistic Director - Visual Design	
Far Cry 5	2018	Ubisoft	Art Director - Visual Design	
Homefront: The Revolution	2016	Dambuster Studios	Additional	
Far Cry Primal	2016	Ubisoft	Additional Presentation Director	
Far Cry 4	2014	Ubisoft	Presentation Director	
Crysis 3	2014	Crytek	Lead 2D Artist	
Crysis 2	2011	Crytek	UI Artist	
Crysis	2011	Crytek	2D Flash / UI Artist	
