= Far Cry =

First-person shooter video game franchise

- Genre: First-person shooter Action-adventure
- Developers: Crytek (2004); Ubisoft Montreal (2005–2019); Ubisoft Toronto (2018–present)
- Publisher: Ubisoft
- Platforms: Microsoft Windows; Xbox; Xbox 360; Wii; Arcade; PlayStation 3; PlayStation 4; Xbox One; Google Stadia; Xbox Series X/S; PlayStation 5
- First release: Far Cry; March 23, 2004
- Latest release: Far Cry 6 October 7, 2021

Far Cry is an anthology franchise of first-person shooter games published by Ubisoft. The first game, Far Cry, was developed by Crytek to premiere their CryEngine software, and released in March 2004. Subsequently, Ubisoft obtained the rights to the franchise and the bulk of the development is handled by Ubisoft Montreal with assistance from other Ubisoft satellite studios. The following games in the series have used a Ubisoft-modified version of the CryEngine, the Dunia Engine, allowing for open world gameplay. As of 2025, the franchise consists of six mainline games, a standalone expansion, and several spin-offs; additionally, the first game, initially developed for Microsoft Windows, saw a number of ports to video game consoles, which changed several elements and are therefore considered standalone releases.

The Far Cry games, due to the history of their development, do not have any significant shared narrative elements, but instead share a theme of placing the player in a wilderness environment where they must fight against one or more despots that control the region as well as survive against wild animals that roam the open spaces. The Far Cry games feature a single-player campaign with later titles also offering co-operative campaign support. The games also offer competitive multiplayer options and the ability for users to edit the games' maps for these matches. The Far Cry games have generally been well received, with praise for their open world gameplay and antagonists, but criticism for their lack of innovation, and are considered commercial successes.

== Premise and gameplay ==
The main Far Cry games are first-person shooters (FPS) with action-adventure elements. Whereas the first Far Cry and its spin-offs/remakes were typical FPS with discrete levels, Far Cry 2 and the subsequent games have adapted an open world-style of gameplay, with main story and side missions and optional quests to complete.

There are minimal narrative elements or chronology between the games. Instead, the Far Cry games have generally shared the theme of taking the player to "a lawless frontier" where "values and laws of today are non-functional", along with elements of having to survive in the wilderness including hunting and crafting. The player often needs to work with freedom fighters attempting to regain control of a region from a ruling party, and may have to pit different sides of a conflict against each other through their actions. Some of the series' games have been more rooted in realistic conflicts, while others have involved elements of the supernatural or science fiction. Ubisoft Montreal, the principal developers of the series, do consider that all games share the same common fictional universe, and have reused some minor characters to maintain that, but otherwise anticipate each game can be enjoyed as a standalone title without knowledge of the other games.

== History ==
Release timeline Main series in bold
2004	**Far Cry**
2005	Far Cry Instincts
2006	Far Cry Instincts: Evolution
2006	Far Cry Instincts: Predator
2006	Far Cry Vengeance
2007	Paradise Lost
2008	**Far Cry 2**
2009
2010
2011
2012	**Far Cry 3**
2013	Far Cry 3: Blood Dragon
2014	**Far Cry 4**
2015
2016	Far Cry Primal
2017
2018	**Far Cry 5**
2019	Far Cry New Dawn
2020
2021	Far Cry VR: Dive Into Insanity
2021	**Far Cry 6**

=== Origins with Crytek (2004–2007) ===
The first Far Cry game was developed by the German studio Crytek, and premiered their CryEngine software. One of Crytek's goals with the CryEngine was to be able to render realistic outdoor spaces with large viewing distances, which was a unique feature compared with other game engines at the time of its release. The CryEngine was originally demonstrated as a tech demo at Electronic Entertainment Expo (E3) 1999 under the name X-Isle: Dinosaur Island specifically aimed at Nvidia graphics processors. The demo allowed the user to explore a virtual tropical island populated with dinosaurs, showcasing the size of the virtual world that the CryEngine could handle. Following E3 1999, they secured a deal with Nvidia to distribute X-Isle alongside all Nvidia cards as benchmarking software, as at the time the CryEngine was the most demanding game engine on the market. Ubisoft made a deal with Crytek to build out X-Isle into a full AAA title and obtained publishing rights for this title.

This game develops the story of player-character Jack Carver, who stumbles upon the genetic research of Dr. Krieger and the Krieger Corporation, on a fictional Micronesia island, to create powerful Trigen Beasts as weapons later sold to mercenaries. Far Cry released in March 2004 for Microsoft Windows to critical praise and strong sales, with over 730,000 units sold in the first four months.

Following Far Cry's release, Crytek, wanting to show that CryEngine had other applications, signed a deal in July 2004 to develop a gaming franchise with publisher Electronic Arts (EA), a direct competitor to Ubisoft. This franchise became the Crysis series, and through which Crytek continued to improve their CryEngine. With Crytek unable to work with them, Ubisoft assigned its studio Ubisoft Montreal to help port the title to the various game consoles through the Far Cry Instincts and Far Cry Vengeance titles. These titles required Ubisoft Montreal to rework much of the game as the consoles at this point in time were not as powerful as personal computers, and could not handle the wide open levels without performance problems. These games created more linear levels from the original Far Cry, added campaigns and multiplayer modes, and in some cases, changed the game's narrative to less-realistic outcomes. In March 2006, Ubisoft acquired all rights to the Far Cry series and a perpetual license for the CryEngine version used in the development of Far Cry. Ubisoft Montreal remained the principal studio developing all future Far Cry games.

=== Shifts to internal development (2008–2011) ===
Far Cry 2 was announced by Ubisoft in July 2007 and featured two significant changes from the previous Far Cry games. First, it premiered the use of the Dunia Engine, a modified form of the licensed CryEngine by Ubisoft Montreal. The Dunia engine was developed alongside Far Cry 2 to make a fully open-world game as well as adding realistic physics and destroyable environments. Second, rather than continuing in the narrative of the first Far Cry, it created a more open-ended narrative, featuring nine playable characters and the means for the player to create their own stories with the other non-playable characters in the game with an advanced artificial intelligence system. Part of the reason the narrative from Far Cry was dropped was that its main character Jack Carver was not memorable with players, and that the ending of the game, particularly with the changes made for Instincts and Vengeance, took a significant turn into science fiction, something that the developers wanted to avoid with Far Cry 2. Ubisoft also recognized that through the various console versions that players would be tired of the tropic setting as well as fearing that Crytek's project with EA was also set in a tropic location, and thus opted to change the locale to the plains of Africa. For Far Cry 2, the game takes place in a fictional African country in the midst of a civil war that is being financially funded by a figure known as the Jackal, whom the player-character, a mercenary for hire, is tasked to bring down with the help of other mercenaries and locals.

Far Cry 2 was released in October 2008, and was critically praised and commercially successful, with over 2.9 million in sales by 2009. However, the game's director, Clint Hocking, noted that internally, much of the design of Far Cry 2 was haphazard. Far Cry 2 had a polarizing reception from players over some of the gameplay features that were implemented to make the game feel diegetic and immerse the player into the world. Some of these disputed mechanics included the random onset of malaria that would impact the character's vision and movement until they obtained and took medicine for it, a weapon decay system that would cause guns picked up from enemies to wear down and break over use, military checkpoints that a player could clear out but which would become repopulated with enemies minutes later, and the game's buddy system, where the player could call a selected non-player character to help their character in battle, but only for a short while and would not be available until the player reached a safe house to rest.

=== Expansion as series (2012–ongoing) ===
Pre-production work for Far Cry 3 had reportedly started just after Far Cry 2 was shipped, with plans to keep it as a narrative sequel, but in the few years that followed, many of the development leads for Far Cry 2 left the studio. The project had a significant shift of locale, returning to a tropical island theme similar to Far Cry while retaining the open-world nature of Far Cry 2. They also looked to keep the key elements of Far Cry 2's open world that worked but add in more features to make it feel like a living world but with purpose behind how they designed it. This led to the development of the Dunia 2 engine to implement some open-world features such as weather system, which premiered in Far Cry 3. Several of the questionable gameplay elements of Far Cry 2 were eliminated. Further, to make this world meaningful, they eliminated the multiple player-characters and instead provided one character that they could write a strong narrative around. Within Far Cry 3, the player-character is part of a group of adventuring tourists caught by the pirate Vaas Montenegro who has tortured the island's native population. The introduction of a well-defined villain character in Vaas that was the focal point for much of the game further redefined how the Far Cry games going forward would be presented, each centered around a similar crafted character central to the game's plot. Far Cry 3 was formally announced in 2011 and released in November 2012. Though Far Cry 3 presented some controversial elements within its narrative, it received critical acclaim and had sold more than 10 million units by 2014.

The basic gameplay of Far Cry 3 established the series' general approach that was used in the next main series' iterations but shifted locales from the tropical setting. These games included Far Cry 4 (2014), set in the fictional Himalayan country of Kyrat ruled by the tyrannical Pagan Min and his Royal Army, Far Cry 5 (2018), taking place in fictional Hope County in Montana where a doomsday cult Eden's Gate, led by Joseph Seed, has locked down the region, and Far Cry 6 (2021), set on a fictional island country of Yara in the midst of revolution which "El Presidente" Antón Castillo rules as a dictator. All these games maintained the theme of a lawless land and required the player to rely on a number of gameplay skills beyond combat, such as hunting and crafting to a degree, to succeed. Each iteration of the games has used the Dunia 2 engine with further enhancements to improve performance and take advantage of newer technologies.

Extending from the main games were smaller side games that were built using the main games' existing maps and assets. The first of these was Far Cry 3: Blood Dragon, released in May 2013, following its announcement by Ubisoft on the previous April Fools' Day. The game, a standalone title, was an experiment release developed by Dean Evans that worked atop the existing Far Cry 3 assets, reskinning some of the game's existing maps and geometry. It took a tongue-in-cheek approach to the culture of the 1980s. It became a commercial success with more than 1 million units sold. Its success led to similar "reskins" for the next two main games in Far Cry Primal (2016) (from Far Cry 4) and Far Cry New Dawn (2019) (from Far Cry 5).

While Ubisoft has yet to formally announce further Far Cry games after Far Cry 6, reports emerged in November 2021 that the next Far Cry game would be a live-service game similar to Ubisoft's plans for the next Assassin's Creed game, codenamed Assassin's Creed Infinity. Around the same time, Dan Hay, executive producer for the Far Cry series since Far Cry 3, announced his departure from Ubisoft Montreal to pursue other opportunities.

In 2026, reports stated that Ubisoft had shifted away from the previously planned extraction shooter codenamed Maverick, with elements of the project reportedly being repurposed into a new open-world first-person shooter codenamed Kodiak. The project was reported to have entered development at Vantage Studios, a Ubisoft development team overseeing several major franchises. Alongside Kodiak, another project codenamed Blackbird was reported to be in development as the next mainline Far Cry entry.

== Main series ==
Aggregate review scores
Game	Metacritic
Far Cry	(PC) 89
Far Cry 2	(PC) 85 (PS3) 85 (X360) 85
Far Cry 3	(PC) 88 (PS3) 90 (X360) 91
Far Cry 4	(PC) 80 (PS4) 85 (XONE) 82
Far Cry 5	(PC) 78 (PS4) 81 (XONE) 82
Far Cry 6	(PC) 74 (PS5) 73 (XBOX X/S) 79

=== Far Cry (2004) ===
Far Cry, the first game in the series, was developed as an open-ended first-person shooter by German studio Crytek, being the first title to use their CryEngine software. The game is set on a mysterious archipelago in Micronesia, where ex-special forces operative Jack Carver must use various weapons, tools, and his surroundings to survive against hostile mercenaries that control the islands while searching for the journalist who was accompanying him and who went missing. As Jack explores the islands, he uncovers the horrific genetic experiments being conducted on the local wildlife and must confront the mad scientist behind them.

The game was published by Ubisoft on March 23, 2004, for Microsoft Windows. It received generally positive reviews, with praise for its visuals, gameplay mechanics, and the level of freedom given to the player, and sold 730,000 units within four months of release.

=== Far Cry 2 (2008) ===
Far Cry 2 was developed by Ubisoft Montreal and published by Ubisoft for Microsoft Windows, PlayStation 3 and Xbox 360 on October 21, 2008, in North America, October 23 in Australia, and October 24 in Europe. The game is set in a fictional East African state where an arms smuggler known as "The Jackal" is selling weapons to two factions engaged in a civil war. The player assumes the role of a mercenary sent to find and kill the Jackal, who is inflaming the conflict. The game's sandbox gameplay has been highly touted, allowing the player access to 50 km^{2} of African terrain, complete with open savannah, forests, animals, and towns. Far Cry 2 also puts more emphasis on realism compared to other games in the series, incorporating features such as weapon jamming and malaria, which the player character gets infected with at the start of the game and must thereafter regularly take medication to avoid dying.

Far Cry 2 received generally positive reviews from critics for its setting, visuals, and open-ended gameplay, although some criticized its writing, artificial intelligence, and technical issues. A number of players also found some aspects of the gameplay, mainly those related to the game's focus on realism, overly repetitive and tedious. The game sold three million copies worldwide within four months of release.

A top-down shooter version of the game for mobile phones was developed and published by Gameloft.

=== Far Cry 3 (2012) ===
Far Cry 3 was developed by Ubisoft Montreal using feedback from Far Cry 2, and published by Ubisoft for Microsoft Windows, PlayStation 3, and Xbox 360 on November 29, 2012, in Australia, November 30 in Europe, and December 4 in North America. It was later re-released on the PlayStation 4 and Xbox One on June 26, 2018. Ahead of release, the game was heavily promoted by Ubisoft with various companion apps, webseries and crossovers. Far Cry 3 takes place on the fictional Rook Islands, a tropical archipelago. After a vacation goes awry, protagonist Jason Brody, an ordinary American tourist, must learn the ways of the jungle to survive and rescue his friends, who have been captured by the insane Vaas Montenegro and his gang of pirates to be sold into slavery.

Larger in scope and ambition than its predecessors, Far Cry 3 received largely positive reviews, with praise for its characters (in particular Vaas), world design, visuals, progression, and gameplay, though the multiplayer modes received some criticism. The game has sold nearly ten million copies in its lifetime, and was nominated for multiple year-end accolades in 2012, including Game of the Year and Best Shooter.

=== Far Cry 4 (2014) ===
Far Cry 4 was developed by Ubisoft Montreal and published by Ubisoft for Microsoft Windows, PlayStation 3, PlayStation 4, Xbox 360, and Xbox One on November 18, 2014, in Australia and North America, and November 20 in Europe. The game was originally conceptualized as a direct sequel to Far Cry 3, before it was turned into a standalone story like the other games in the series. The game is set in the fictional country of Kyrat in the Himalayas region, ruled by a despotic self-appointed king named Pagan Min. The protagonist, Ajay Ghale, becomes caught in a civil war and must overthrow Min, after he is instructed by his late mother to travel again, from the U.S., to his homeland to spread her ashes there. Aspects of the game's story were inspired by the 1996–2006 Nepalese Civil War.

Far Cry 4 received positive reviews for its world design, visuals, soundtrack, and characters as well as new gameplay additions and the wealth of content. However, the story had a more divisive reception, and the game was criticized for its lack of innovation from Far Cry 3. The game had the biggest launch in the franchise's history, selling seven million copies by the end of 2014.

=== Far Cry 5 (2018) ===
Far Cry 5 was developed by Ubisoft Montreal and Ubisoft Toronto. Announced in early 2017, it was released worldwide on March 27, 2018, for Microsoft Windows, PlayStation 4, and Xbox One. The game is set in modern-day Montana in the fictional Hope County, which is controlled by a doomsday cult called the Project at Eden's Gate, led by "The Father" Joseph Seed and his siblings. Players assume the role of a customizable sheriff's deputy who becomes entangled in a violent conflict between the cult and the resisting residents of Hope County who have seen their friends and family taken or killed by the cult. The game was heavily inspired by several socio-political events in modern history, such as the Cold War and the September 11 attacks. The development team sought to capture the despondent social climate after the events and re-purpose it for the game.

Far Cry 5 received generally positive reviews for its world design, visuals, gameplay, and soundtrack, although the narrative and some of the characters received criticism. It also became the subject of controversy after being announced alongside a period of heightened political conflicts. The game was a commercial success and became the fastest-selling title in the franchise, grossing over $310 million in its first week of sales.

=== Far Cry 6 (2021) ===
Far Cry 6 was developed by Ubisoft Toronto and published by Ubisoft for Microsoft Windows, PlayStation 4, PlayStation 5, Xbox One, Xbox Series X/S and Stadia on October 7, 2021. The game is set on the fictional island of Yara (loosely based on modern-day Cuba), ruled by fascist dictator Antón Castillo (portrayed by Giancarlo Esposito) who seeks to bring his son, Diego (Anthony Gonzalez), to be his heir amidst a revolutionary uprising by freedom fighters. Players assume the role of guerilla fighter Dani Rojas, attempting to topple Castillo and his regime. The game was inspired by several revolutions of recent history, primarily the Cuban Revolution of 1953–1959, and features the return of several elements from earlier Far Cry titles, such as a tropical setting and a fully voiced protagonist.

Far Cry 6 received generally mixed reviews. Although the setting, visuals, Esposito's performance, and the minor improvements to the series' gameplay formula were praised, the lack of innovation and the aging design were criticized.

== Spin-offs ==
Aggregate review scores
Game	Metacritic
Far Cry Instincts: Evolution	(Xbox) 78
Far Cry 3: Blood Dragon	(PC) 81 (PS3) 82 (X360) 80
Far Cry Primal	(PC) 74 (PS4) 76 (XONE) 77
Far Cry New Dawn	(PC) 73 (PS4) 71 (XONE) 75

=== Far Cry Instincts: Evolution (2006) ===
A sequel to Far Cry Instincts, released for the Xbox on March 27, 2006, Evolution features a new single-player campaign, albeit considerably shorter than that of Instincts, as well as new weapons, vehicles, an expanded mapmaker and an extra multiplayer mode. Maps that are created on the Xbox version of Instincts cannot be transferred to the Xbox 360 version.

=== Far Cry 3: Blood Dragon (2013) ===
Blood Dragon is a stand-alone "expansion pack" based on the world of Far Cry 3. Although Blood Dragon does not continue the story of Far Cry 3, it shares the same game engine and gameplay mechanics. News of its development was leaked by the Brazilian ratings board, which awarded an 18+ certification based on the title's references to violence, sex, and drugs. The game's retrospective story, characters and visual style are inspired by 1980s action movies, especially those starring Arnold Schwarzenegger, such as Commando, The Terminator, and Predator, and Sylvester Stallone, like Cobra, First Blood, and Rocky IV. Other film/television references include RoboCop, Escape from New York, Scarface and Teenage Mutant Ninja Turtles, among others. Pre-orders of the PC version received a digital copy of the soundtrack, produced by Melbourne, Australia-based Power Glove. Due to the success of the title, Ubisoft CEO Yves Guillemot has stated that the game may also get a retail release.

A crossover title with the Trials series, Trials of the Blood Dragon is based on Far Cry 3: Blood Dragon and was released in June 2016. A remastered version of Blood Dragon is included in the season pass of Far Cry 6.

=== Far Cry Primal (2016) ===
Announced in October 2015, Far Cry Primal is a spin-off to Far Cry 4, developed by Ubisoft Montreal and published by Ubisoft for the PlayStation 4 and Xbox One on February 23, 2016, and for Microsoft Windows on March 1, 2016. The game is set during the Stone Age, in the fictional Oros valley in Central and Eastern Europe, and follows the story of Takkar, who starts off as an unarmed hunter and rises to become the leader of a tribe. Primal received generally mixed reviews. While the concept, world design, and certain gameplay mechanics, such as the ability to tame animals, were praised, the story and characters were seen as inferior compared to previous Far Cry games. Most critics also felt that, because of the game's setting, there was a significant lack of weapons to utilize, leading to a repetitive gameplay design.

=== Far Cry New Dawn (2019) ===
Far Cry New Dawn is a spin-off and sequel to Far Cry 5, developed by Ubisoft Montreal and published by Ubisoft for Microsoft Windows, PlayStation 4, and Xbox One on February 15, 2019. The game is set seventeen years after one of the possible endings of Far Cry 5 and follows the survivors of a nuclear war as they attempt to rebuild their community, with players assuming the role of an unnamed and highly customizable Captain. The game takes place on a modified version of Far Cry 5's map and introduces several elements from the RPG genre, including an upgradeable home base and increased reliance on crafting from limited supplies. New Dawn received generally mixed reviews, with praise for its world design and gameplay and criticism for its narrative and similarities to Far Cry 5 and was less financially successful than both Far Cry 5 and Far Cry Primal.

=== Far Cry VR: Dive Into Insanity (2021) ===
Far Cry VR: Dive Into Insanity is a virtual reality game set in the same tropical island location as Far Cry 3. Released on June 1, 2021, it features Vaas Montenegro as its central antagonist.

== Other media ==
=== Live-action adaptations ===
- A direct-to-video-film, Far Cry, released in 2008 was directed by Uwe Boll and stars Til Schweiger as Jack Carver. The film follows Jack Carver, an ex-special forces soldier turned boatman who is hired by a journalist to investigate a top-secret military base on a nearby island. The film received negative reviews with most critics saying it does the games no justice.
- The Far Cry Experience is a four-part webseries released in 2012 that serves as a prequel to the events of Far Cry 3. It features Christopher Mintz-Plasse playing a fictionalized version of himself who is captured by Vaas (played by Michael Mando) and his pirates and becomes the subject of Vaas's torture show.
- In 2013, it was reported that a Far Cry film was in development by Ubisoft Motion Pictures, along with a Watch Dogs and Raving Rabbids film, although there has been no news about the project since.
- Inside Eden's Gate is a short film released on March 5, 2018, as a tie-in prequel to Far Cry 5. It follows three filmmakers investigating the rumors surrounding the Project at Eden's Gate and encountering Joseph Seed (played by Greg Bryk) and the other members of the Seed family.
- In November 2025, it was announced that Noah Hawley and Rob McElhenney (AKA "Mac") would co-create a new adaptation for FX. Mac will also star in the show, which will be an anthology series like the franchise on which it is based. In June 2026, Lizzy Caplan was cast alongside Mac. In July 2026, Steve Buscemi joined the cast. In September 2026, Brendan Gleeson, Jennifer Jason Leigh, Hamish Linklater, Sam Spruell and Jamie Demetriou were announced as cast members of the series.

=== Animated series ===
In 2019, it was announced that Ubisoft was working with Castlevania executive producer Adi Shankar in order to develop an animated series based in the world of Far Cry 3: Blood Dragon titled Captain Laserhawk: A Blood Dragon Remix. It then went into production for Netflix during June 2021, with Bobbypills leading the animation and Balak as creative director. The series was released worldwide in October 2023 with six episodes.

=== Board game ===
On September 20, 2021, it was announced that board game publisher Funforge would partner with Ubisoft to create a board game based on the franchise titled Far Cry Beyond.

=== Novels ===
- German-language novels by Michael T. Bhatty:
  - Far Cry: Götterdämmerung (Panini, 2007, ISBN 3-8332-1568-2) - an expanded novelization of the original Far Cry game.
  - Far Cry 2: Blutige Diamanten (Panini, 2008, ISBN 3-8332-1742-1) - a prequel to Far Cry 2.
- Far Cry: Absolution (2018) by Urban Waite – a prequel to Far Cry 5.

=== Comics ===
- Far Cry: Rite of Passage (2021) - a comic book miniseries published by Dark Horse Comics as a tie-in to Far Cry 6. It features the game's primary antagonist, Antón Castillo, recounting cautionary tales to his son Diego about the rise and fall of previous villains in the series (Vaas Montenegro, Pagan Min, and Joseph Seed).
- Happy Vaas Day, a 2021 manga one-shot by Hiromu Nagase published by Jump in collaboration with Ubisoft. The story depicts a young Vaas Montenegro.
- Inside, a 2021 manga one-shot published by Jump in collaboration with Ubisoft. The story follows a young man as he plays Far Cry 4 and begins pondering the morality of the characters.
- Far Cry: Esperanza's Tears, published by Ablaze in October 2022 is a prequel comic to Far Cry 6.

== Sales ==
Ubisoft reports that through 2014, lifetime sales of the Far Cry franchise have exceeded 20 million units. By September 2019, the series had accumulated a combined 50 million units in sales.
