= Greg Bryk =

Canadian film and television actor (b. 1972)

- Born: Gregory Michael Bryk; 19 August 1972 (age 54); Winnipeg, Manitoba, Canada
- Education: Queen's University at Kingston
- Occupation: Actor
- Years active: 1998–present
- Known for: Bitten; Far Cry 5 Frontier
- Spouse: Danielle Nicholas (m. 1996)
- Children: Dempsey Bryk; Billy Bryk; Ella Bryk

Gregory Michael Bryk (born 19 August 1972) is a Canadian film and television actor known for his work in the series ReGenesis (2004–2008), XIII: The Series (2011–2012), Bitten (2014–2016) and Frontier (2016–2018), and in the Far Cry video games.

== Early life and education ==
Bryk was born on 19 August 1972, in Winnipeg, Manitoba, Canada to Doreen (née Phill) and Don Bryk. Bryk graduated from Queen's University in Kingston, Ontario, in 1994 with a Bachelor of Arts in drama. While attending Queen's, he was a member of the football team as a linebacker. During his time on the team, he helped the Gaels win the 28th Vanier Cup.

== Career ==
Byrk has appeared in numerous films and television series and is best known for his reoccurring roles in ReGenesis (2004–2008), XIII: The Series (2011–2012), Bitten (2014–2016) and Frontier (2016–2018).

He is also known for his role in the 2018 video game Far Cry 5, which he portrayed the game's lead antagonist Joseph Seed through performance capture. He reprised the role in Far Cry: New Dawn (2019) and Far Cry 6 (2021).

== Personal life ==
Bryk met his wife, Danielle Nicholas Bryk, while both were studying English literature at Queen's University. The couple married in 1996 and have 3 children together; Dempsey, Billy, and Ella. Both of his sons are also actors.

== Filmography ==
=== Film ===
Year	Title	Role	Notes
1998	The Pawn	Vinnie	
2002	Men with Brooms	Alexander Yount	
2003	The Gospel of John	Disciple	
2005	A History of Violence	Billy Orser	
2005	Neil	Neil	
2006	Living Death	Victor Harris	Direct-to-video film
2007	Weirdsville	Abel	
2007	Poor Boy's Game	Keith Rose	
2007	Shoot 'Em Up	Go-To Guy	
2008	Grindstone Road	Graham Sloan	
2008	The Incredible Hulk	Commando #1	
2008	Saw V	Mallick Scott	
2009	You Might as Well Live	"Dixie"	
2009	Screamers: The Hunting	Commander Andy Sexton	Direct-to-video film
2009	Dolan's Cadillac	Chief	
2010	Act of Dishonour	Ben	
2010	Red	Firefighter	
2010	Saw 3D	Mallick Scott	
2011	Man on the Train	Tough Guy	
2011	Immortals	Nycomedes	
2011	Unlucky	Waylon	
2015	Borealis	Hunter	
2016	Lost & Found	Jim Walton	
2018	Far Cry 5: Inside Eden's Gate	The Father	Short film
2019	Rabid	The Director	
2019	Ad Astra	Chip Garnes	
2019	Code 8	Marcus Sutcliffe	
2020	Secret Society of Second-Born Royals	Inmate 34 / Prince / Uncle Edmond	Disney+ film
2020	My Spy	Victor Marquez	
2020	Marlene	Steven Truscott	
2020	Bloodthirsty	Vaughn Daniels	
2021	Trigger Point	Richard Pool	
2023	Cascade	Nick	
2025	Hunting Grounds	Donny	
2025	Racewalkers	Kurt Lester	
2025	Violence	Waters	
2026	Foreign Tongue	Carl Jung	

=== Television ===
Year	Title	Role	Notes
1998	Rescuers: Stories of Courage: Two Families	Gestapo Clerk	TV movie
2000	Relic Hunter	Matt	Episode: "Possessed"
2001	Mutant X	Ledeker	Episode: "In the Presence of Mine Enemies"
2002	Sue Thomas: F.B.Eye	Dr. Pierre	Episode: "A Blast from the Past"
2003	Blue Murder	Phil Grady	Episode: "Love and Marriage"
2003	Starhunter	Dakota Clan Minion	Episode: "Star Crossed"
2004	Missing	Mr. Keegan	Episode: "Last Stop"
2004–2005	Show Me Yours	Ogden Brunt	2 episodes
2004–2008	ReGenesis	Weston Field	Main role (50 episodes)
2005	Tilt	Pete Shurgin	3 episodes
2005	Slatland	Rezvan Balescu	TV movie
2007	The Gathering	Tommy Carrier	2 episodes
2007	Blood Ties	Father Cascioli	Episode: "Deep Dark"
2007	The Robber Bride	Henry Kelly	TV movie
2007–2008	The Dresden Files	Tommy Tomm	2 episodes
2008	XIII: The Conspiracy	Colonel Amos	2 episodes
2009	The Listener	Henderson	Episode: "I'm an Adult Now"
2009	Flashpoint	Sloan Keller	Episode: "Just a Man"
2009	Deadliest Sea	Stubbs	TV movie
2009	The Good Times Are Killing Me	Huxley	TV movie
2009	The Dealership	Scott Calen	TV movie
2010	Cra$h & Burn	Kazmir	5 episodes
2010	Republic of Doyle	Tom Rockwell	Episode: "The Woman Who Knew Too Little"
2010	The Bridge	Dominic "Dom" Furillo	Episode: "Brown Sugar"
2010	Happy Town	Dr. Pete	3 episodes
2010	Aaron Stone	"Damaged"	6 episodes
2010	Red: Werewolf Hunter	Marcus Sullivan	TV movie
2011	Combat Hospital	Master Sergeant Edward Farringdon	2 episodes
2011	Mistletoe over Manhattan	Joe Martel	TV movie
2011	Against the Wall	—N/a	Episode: "The Fifth Body"
2011	Covert Affairs	Nils Crofft	Episode: "Letter Never Sent"
2011–2012	XIII: The Series	Amos	24 episodes
2012	Wrath of Grapes: The Don Cherry Story II	Hap Emms	Episode: "Night 2"
2012	The Phantoms	Greg Young	TV movie
2012	Lost Girl	Cleasby	Episode: "Lachlan's Gambit"
2012	Rookie Blue	Jon Grey	2 episodes
2012	Transporter: The Series	Bernhardt	Episode: "12 Hours"
2013	Cracked	Vincent Kray	Episode: "The Thumb Parade"
2013	Nikita	Karl Jaeger	Episode: "High-Value Target"
2014	Reign	Viscount Richard de la Croix	Episode: "Inquisition"
2014	The Divide	Raymond	2 episodes
2014–2016	Bitten	Jeremy Danvers	Main role (33 episodes)
2015	The Book of Negroes	Robertson Appleby	3 episodes
2015	Fargo	Virgil Bauer	Episode: "The Gift of the Magi"
2015–2016	The Expanse	Lopez	4 episodes
2016	Wynonna Earp	Jack of Knives	2 episodes
2016–2018	Frontier	Cobbs Pond	Main role (18 episodes)
2017	Ransom	Rand Govender	Episode: "Joe"
2017	Mary Kills People	Grady	6 episodes
2017	Saving Hope	Danny Kilbride	Episode: "Tested and Tried"
2018	Caught	Cyril Carter	5 episodes
2018	The Handmaid's Tale	Commander Ray Cushing	3 episodes
2018	Channel Zero: The Dream Door	Detective McPhillips	4 episodes
2019	V-Wars	Bobby	10 episodes
2020	The Wilds	Tim Campbell	
2021	The Lost Symbol	Ellison Blake	4 episodes
2021	Titans	Fletcher	3 episodes
2023	Star Trek: Strange New Worlds	Captain Harr Caras	Episode: "Those Old Scientists"
2024	Law & Order Toronto: Criminal Intent	Rick Kinwood	Episode: "The Real Eve"
2025	Reacher	Darien Prado	3 episodes

=== Video games ===
Year	Title	Voice role	Notes
2018	Far Cry 5	Joseph Seed	Likeness and motion capture
2019	Far Cry: New Dawn	Joseph Seed	Likeness and motion capture
2021	Far Cry 6	Joseph Seed	Likeness and motion capture
