= Far Cry 5 =

2018 video game

- Cover art featuring antagonist Joseph Seed in a scene imitating Leonardo da Vinci's The Last Supper
- Developer: Ubisoft Montreal (Note: Additional work by Ubisoft Toronto, Ubisoft Shanghai, Ubisoft Kyiv, Ubisoft Pune, and Ubisoft Reflections)
- Publisher: Ubisoft
- Directors: Dan Hay; Patrik Methe; Maxime Béland; Ben Bauer
- Producers: Darryl Long; Gordana Vrbanc-Duquet
- Designers: Russ Flaherty; Kyle Kotevich; Andrejs Verlis
- Programmers: Cedric Decelle; Christian Carriere
- Artists: Jean-Alexis Doyon; Liam Wong
- Writers: Drew Holmes; Dan Hay; Jean-Sebastien Decant; Navid Khavari
- Composer: Dan Romer
- Series: Far Cry
- Engine: Dunia 2
- Platforms: PlayStation 4; Windows; Xbox One; Stadia; Luna
- Release: PlayStation 4, Windows, Xbox One; March 27, 2018; Stadia; November 3, 2020
- Genre: First-person shooter
- Modes: Single-player, multiplayer

Far Cry 5 is a 2018 first-person shooter developed by Ubisoft Montreal and published by Ubisoft. It is the successor to 2014's Far Cry 4, and the fifth main installment in the Far Cry series. Set in Hope County, a fictional region of Montana, United States, the game revolves around the Project at Eden's Gate, a doomsday cult that has taken over the county under the command of its charismatic and powerful leader, Joseph Seed. Players control an unnamed junior deputy sheriff who becomes trapped in Hope County and must work alongside various resistance factions to liberate the region from the despotic rule of the Seeds and Eden's Gate. Gameplay focuses on combat and exploration; players battle enemy soldiers and dangerous wildlife using a wide array of weapons. The game features many elements found in role-playing games, such as a branching storyline and side quests. The game also features a map editor, a co-operative multiplayer mode, and a competitive multiplayer mode.

Announced in early 2017, development on Far Cry 5 was extensive. The team explored several concepts before settling on an American location. The game was heavily inspired by several socio-political events in modern history, such as the Cold War and the September 11 attacks. The development team sought to capture the despondent social climate after the events and re-purpose it for the game.

Far Cry 5 was released worldwide for PlayStation 4, Windows, and Xbox One in March 2018. It received mostly positive reviews, although it was the subject of controversy after being announced alongside a period of heightened political conflicts. Critics praised the open world design, visuals, gameplay and soundtrack but directed criticisms towards its story and some of the characters. The game was a commercial success, becoming the fastest-selling title in the franchise by grossing over $310 million in its first week of sales and had sold over 10 million units by March 2020. Several releases of downloadable content were subsequently published. A spin-off title and sequel to the narrative, Far Cry New Dawn, was released in February 2019. A successor, Far Cry 6, was released in October 2021.

== Gameplay ==
Far Cry 5 features first-person shooter gameplay similar to prior entries.

Similar to its predecessors, Far Cry 5 is a first-person shooter set in an open world environment which the player can explore freely on foot or via various vehicles. Unlike previous titles in the series where the player takes on the role of a set character, the game gives the player the opportunity to customize their character's appearance. Additionally, the character in this game is a silent protagonist, devoid of voiced dialogue or a predefined personality, offering players the chance to deeply immerse themselves in the game, yet sparking concerns about the potential impact on the depth of narrative engagement. While the player has a variety of ranged and explosive weapons to fight against enemies, the game places a renewed emphasis on close-quarters combat compared to previous Far Cry titles by introducing a wider range of melee weapons. In addition, Far Cry 5 features a new weapons ballistics system that includes elements like a bullet dropping over a distance to increase realism.

Creative director Dan Hay described the design of the open world as being modeled on the outposts from previous titles in the Far Cry series. These outposts represented a small section of the map occupied by enemy forces and the player was tasked with liberating them by removing the enemy presence. The outposts were designed with multiple approaches for the player to take and it was this element that the development team tried to recreate in the wider game world of Far Cry 5. The player is dropped into the game world with little context, direction or objective markers and is instead required to navigate the world on their own. Hay expressed a desire to create what he termed the "anecdote factory", a game where two players could venture out from the same point in opposite directions and have entirely different experiences that they would then share with one another anecdotally. To assist with this, most of the game world is accessible to the player after completing the game's introductory missions and they are free to advance through these areas as they choose; by comparison, previous titles in the series gradually opened up the game world to the player with story missions guiding their progress through open areas. Completing actions within a region earns the player "Resistance Points" which cumulate to trigger major story events. These Resistance Points also contribute to the "Resistance Meter", which divides each region into three tiers representing the region's relative level of difficulty. For example, on entering a region for the first time, the player will encounter basic enemies; however, as the Resistance Meter increases, the player will run into a wider variety of enemy archetypes, culminating in aerial patrols and airborne assaults.

The game also features a recruitment system in which the player can recruit locals in the county to fight alongside them similar to the "Buddy" system used in Far Cry 2 or the "Guns for Hire" system in Far Cry 4. In this Guns for Hire system, the player can recruit locals to join their cause at which point they will fight alongside the player. In addition to these Guns for Hire, the game includes "Specialists" or non-playable characters with their own unique skills and personalities. The recruitment system replaces the beacon system used in previous titles. For example, Far Cry 3 featured radio towers and Far Cry 4 featured bell towers that the player had to climb in order to open up parts of the map and various activities in the region. Far Cry 5 removed this system and instead relies on the player forging relationships with other characters to discover story missions, events and other characters.

The player has the ability to tame wild animals through the Specialists, which is based on a system that was previously introduced to the series in Far Cry Primal. The tamed wildlife assists the player in combat and follow the player's orders. Different wildlife have different combat patterns. A fishing mechanic was also introduced and a variety of fish can be caught. The campaign can be played individually or with a partner through the game's cooperative multiplayer mode known as "Friends for Hire".

=== Map maker and multiplayer ===
Far Cry Arcade allows players to build and share small maps that have single player, two-player cooperative, and multiplayer objectives. Players are able to construct maps using assets from Far Cry 5 and its downloadable content, as well as Far Cry 4, Far Cry Primal, Watch Dogs, Assassin's Creed IV: Black Flag, and Assassin's Creed: Unity. While a separate mode from the main game, the Arcade mode can be accessed from arcade cabinets scattered around the game's map; successfully completing these maps can earn in-game money and other rewards for the main campaign.

== Plot ==
=== Setting and characters ===
The flag of Eden's Gate

The game is set in the fictional Hope County, Montana, where a preacher named Joseph Seed (portrayed by Greg Bryk) has risen to prominence. Seed believes that he has been chosen by God to protect the people of Hope County from "the Collapse", a global catastrophe that will see the collapse of society, and has established a congregation called the Project at Eden's Gate in order to lead the people to salvation; in reality, Seed is a radical preacher and Eden's Gate is a militaristic doomsday cult. Under his rule, Eden's Gate has used both coercion and violence to forcibly convert the residents of Hope County, and intimidation to keep them from contacting the outside world for help. Seed has assumed the title of "the Father" and maintains control over Hope County with the aid of his Heralds: Jacob, "the Soldier" (Mark Pellegrino), Joseph's older brother and a former United States Army sniper who oversees the training and deployment of the cult's armed soldiers; John, "the Baptist" (Seamus Dever), Joseph's younger brother and a lawyer who has been able to acquire much of the land in Hope County for Eden's Gate and leads the forcible conversion of residents; and Rachel Jessop, also known as Faith or "the Siren" (Jenessa Grant), a botanist who acts as a pacifist to bring the people to trust in Joseph, but uses a powerful hallucinogen called Bliss to run forced work camps for residents who resist the cult. The Heralds have converted a series of decommissioned missile silos into fortified bunkers where they intend to wait out "the Collapse" with the cult's followers.

The player takes on the role of a rookie sheriff's deputy—referred to as "the Deputy"—who is part of a task force sent to arrest Seed. The residents of Hope County opposed to Seed and his followers (whom they derogatorily refer to as “Peggies”) include a cast of characters who join the fight with motives ranging from altruism to revenge, profit, and boredom. They are aided by Richard "Dutch" Roosevelt (John Tench), a local survivalist with a deep distrust of government and a history of anti-social behaviour. Characters from the Far Cry series who return in Far Cry 5 include Hurk Drubman Jr. (Dylan Taylor), a dim-witted though well-intentioned redneck party boy with a love of high-powered explosives; and Willis Huntley (Alain Goulem), a sociopathic CIA agent and self-proclaimed "patriot bastard" in the habit of recruiting civilians for dangerous clandestine missions.

=== Plot ===
In late 2018, a joint operation between the United States Marshals Service and the county sheriff's department—consisting of Deputy Marshal Cameron Burke (Doug Hutchison), Sheriff Earl Whitehorse (Christopher Heyerdahl) and his deputies Joey Hudson (Luisa D'Oliveira), Staci Pratt (Julian Bailey) and the player character, an unnamed Junior Deputy—arrive at an Eden's Gate church to detain Joseph Seed with a federal arrest warrant on charges of kidnapping with the intent to harm. Although Joseph offers no resistance, he claims that God will not allow him to be taken. As he is escorted away, cult members attack the task force and cause their helicopter to crash. Joseph escapes and commands the cult to capture the task force members; Hudson is captured by John, Pratt becomes Jacob's slave, and both Whitehorse and the Marshal are hypnotized by Faith.

The Deputy survives and escapes with the help of Richard "Dutch" Roosevelt, a local survivalist and Vietnam veteran who explains that the cult has interpreted the attempt to arrest Joseph as the fulfillment of his prophecies. Believing the end of the world is upon them, they have begun "the Reaping", a concentrated effort to purge Hope County of non-believers and gather all material needs. As the county is now cut off from the outside world, Dutch tasks the Deputy with contacting the fledgling resistance scattered throughout Hope County to gather allies, rescue the task force and dismantle the cult's operations to erode the influence of Joseph and the Heralds. Although the Heralds focus their efforts on stopping the Deputy, they maintain an interest in recruiting him to their cause.

Joseph's younger brother John lures the Deputy to Holland Valley by broadcasting a message showing Hudson as his captive. John indoctrinates residents to the cult's beliefs by subjecting them to a forced baptism to "cleanse" them, tattooing their "sins" onto their bodies, and carving out the marked skin as part of their "atonement". John captures the Deputy and concludes that their sin is Wrath. When the Deputy escapes, John retaliates by taking over the town of Fall's End where he forces the Deputy to confront him and atone for their sins. A counterattack by the local Resistance prompts John to flee, leading to the Deputy engaging him in an aerial dogfight and mortally wounding him. As he lies dying, John remarks that the Deputy will not save anyone and asserts that Joseph is right. The Deputy rescues Hudson and the captive survivors and destroys John's bunker.

The Deputy arrives in the Whitetail Mountains to find the Whitetail Militia already at war with Joseph's older brother Jacob. Jacob recruits and trains the cult's members using The Platters' song "Only You (And You Alone)", which he uses to trigger an altered state of consciousness in the recruits and carry out his commands. Jacob subjects the Deputy to the same conditioning and successfully breaks him, hypnotizing him into killing the Whitetail's leader Eli Palmer (Patrick Garrow) to cripple the resistance. The surviving militia hold Jacob responsible and the Deputy confronts him in the mountains. As he dies, Jacob reflects on how empires rise and fall, and predicts that America will suffer the same fate if it is not prepared. The Deputy retrieves Jacob's bunker key, rescues Pratt and floods the bunker.

Faith, a collaborator and "sister" of the Seeds, oversees the production of Bliss in Henbane River. The hallucinatory effects of Bliss puts its victims in a trance-like state and staying under its influence for too long makes them vulnerable to Faith's hypnotic manipulation. The Deputy reunites with Whitehorse and joins the Cougars, based in the Hope County Jail. Whitehorse informs the Deputy that Burke has been captured and is now under the influence of the Bliss. The Deputy repeatedly encounters Faith, who attempts to persuade the Deputy to join her and live in paradise. The Deputy resists her and rescues Burke, unaware that he has been hypnotized. Burke kills Virgil Minkler, leader of the Cougars and Mayor of Fall's End, opens the jail to Eden's Gate, and kills himself. The Cougars suffer heavy losses repelling the cult and Whitehorse is captured. The Deputy defeats Faith, and she warns them before she dies that Joseph is right about the end of the world, but the Deputy will decide what happens in the end. The Deputy rescues Whitehorse from Faith's bunker and destroys the production of Bliss.

Killing his Heralds prompts Joseph to call the Deputy for a final confrontation at his church. He has captured the Deputy's allies from the resistance groups, hypnotized them with Bliss and is holding Whitehorse, Hudson, and Pratt hostage. Joseph offers the Deputy the option of walking away with his friends unharmed on the condition that he leaves him and Eden's Gate alone.

==== Endings ====
If the Deputy decides to walk away, Joseph forgives him and enters the church with the Deputy's hypnotized allies. The Deputy, Whitehorse, Pratt and Hudson leave in a truck, and Whitehorse assures them that they will return with the National Guard to help liberate Hope County from the cult. Whitehorse turns on the radio and "Only You" plays, triggering Jacob's brainwashing. The Deputy is once again put into a trance and the screen cuts to black.

If the Deputy chooses to resist, Joseph forces the Deputy to fight and revive their hypnotized friends. Radio broadcasts throughout the game have suggested that the world outside Hope County is spiraling into chaos and a nuclear war is imminent. These fears are realized when Joseph is apprehended and a nuclear bomb detonates in the distance. The Deputy, Whitehorse, Pratt and Hudson flee with the captured Joseph to Dutch's bunker. They crash their truck into a tree, which kills Whitehorse, Pratt, and Hudson. A freed Joseph carries the unconscious Deputy to the bunker. The Deputy awakens handcuffed to a bed with Dutch dead on the floor. Joseph laments the loss of his family and land and asserts this is "the Collapse" that he had prophesied. He tells the Deputy that with the loss of his family, that they are all he has left and that they are family now. This ending leads into the spin-off Far Cry New Dawn.

A secret ending can be found at the beginning of the game. The Deputy decides to not arrest Joseph during their first encounter. Whitehorse, who was against apprehending him head-on because of the probability of being ambushed and killed, lowers Joseph's hands and orders the group to leave. Despite Burke's protests, Whitehorse asserts that it is "better to leave well enough alone" and that no one would be alive if they arrested Joseph.

=== Downloadable content ===
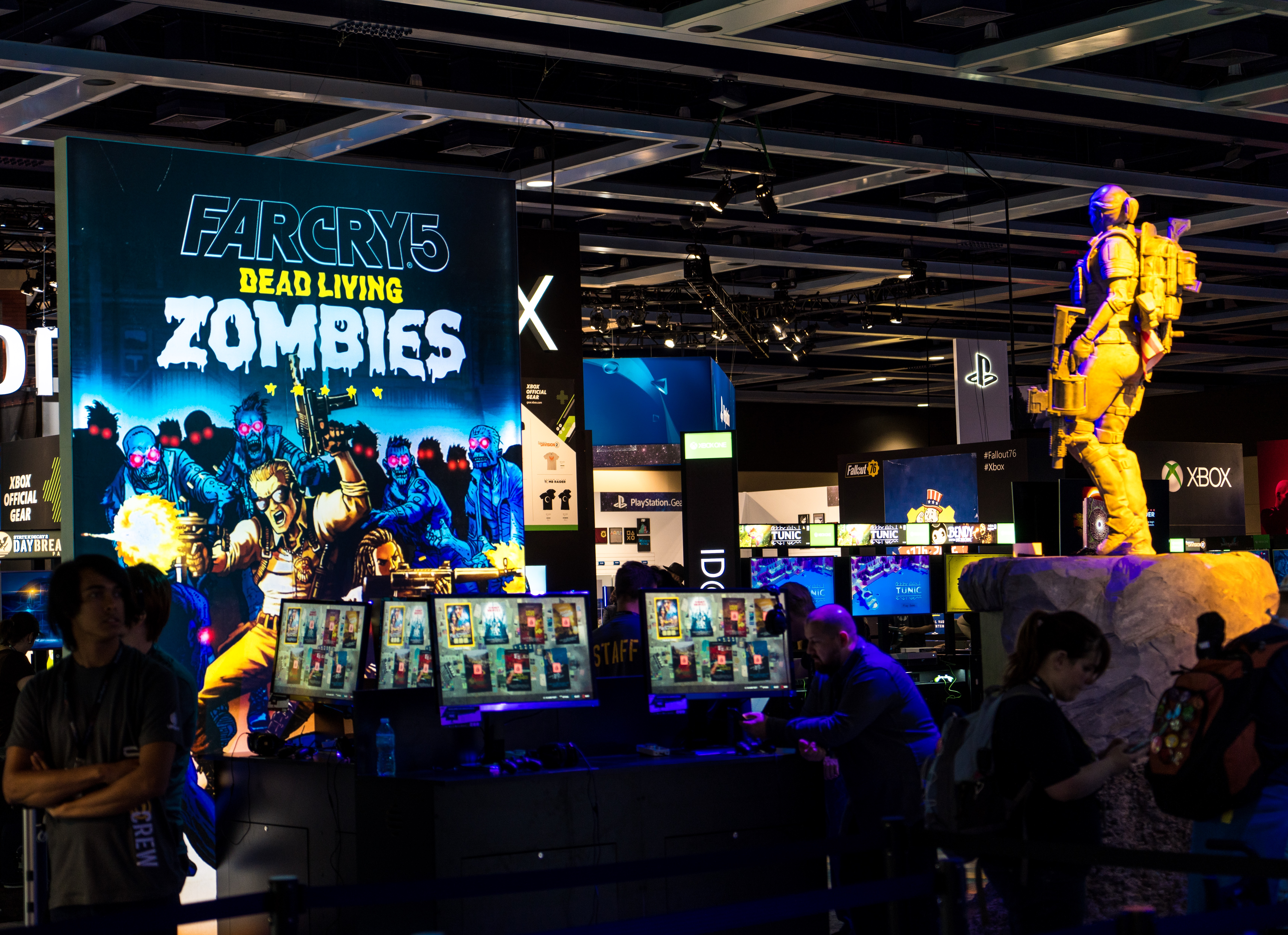
Promotion of Dead Living Zombies at PAX West 2018

Prior to the game's release, Ubisoft announced to release three episodes of downloadable content titled Hours of Darkness, Lost on Mars and Dead Living Zombies. Each episode tells a stand-alone story focusing on a secondary character from the main campaign.

Hours of Darkness takes place during the height of the Vietnam War. The player takes on the role of Wendell Redler (Billy MacLellan), a door gunner known by the call-sign Python 2–5. Python's helicopter is shot down while on a mission to scout the positions of North Vietnamese forces in a wide jungle valley. He is taken captive by the North Vietnamese Army, but escapes during an airstrike. He recovers a radio from the downed helicopter and is instructed to cross the valley to an extraction point. What started as a reconnaissance mission becomes a rescue mission as Python locates his squadmates Joker, Moses and Yokel (Alex Weiner). As he ventures through enemy territory, Python frees South Vietnamese prisoners of war, sabotages anti-aircraft batteries, kills North Vietnamese commanders and survives the spraying of Agent Orange. When they arrive at the extraction point, Python and his squadmates fight off waves of soldiers as they wait for the helicopters. The survivors are safely extracted and flown out of the valley.

Lost on Mars focuses on Nick Rye (Steve Byers). Nick is teleported to Mars where he meets the disembodied head of Hurk Drubman Jr. Hurk reveals that he had Nick teleported for a mission to save Earth after Hurk himself failed. Nick is introduced to ANNE (Erica Lindbeck), a millennia-old artificial intelligence who warns that a hostile alien race called the Arachnids are putting together the final preparations for an invasion of Earth. With no way to get home, Nick is enlisted to restore power to ANNE, allowing her to build her defences and thwart the invasion. Hurk is given a robotic body to assist in the mission and asks Nick to locate his missing body parts. Nick grows suspicious of ANNE's intentions while experiencing a series of apocalyptic visions involving his newborn daughter and Hope County. The two manage to fully restore power to ANNE, but doing so allows her to ready her own invasion of earth as she sees humans as inferior lifeforms. They fight both her robots and clones of Hurk made from his re-assembled body. They successfully shut ANNE down at the expense of Hurk's body. Nick and the robotic Hurk return to Earth, where they are celebrated as heroes.

Dead Living Zombies follows Guy Marvel (Giles Panton), an auteur film director who has a reputation for being impossible to work with. The style and tone of Dead Living Zombies are very different to the main story campaign and other downloadable content episodes, relying on parody, meta-humor and irreverence over plot. It recounts Marvel's career and how he wound up in Montana during the Eden's Gate incident. The early days of Marvel's career see him accosting established directors with unsolicited pitches for zombie films. While the directors try to see the merits of his projects, it quickly becomes apparent that they are gratuitously violent with little plot or character development and the directors lose interest. Marvel tries to adapt his pitches based on the feedback he receives, but is told that his films should "say something about society". He becomes frustrated when a director tries to seize creative control over pitch for a global warming-themed zombie film. Realizing that he has been approaching the wrong kind of director, he finds some success when a studio picks up his idea for a summer blockbuster called The Fast and the Fiendish (based on The Fast and the Furious franchise) and he receives his first screenwriting credit. His final pitch is for Laboratory of the Dead, which is positively received by a director who loves everything the others hated about Marvel's films. Marvel admits that he has no experience directing films and is offered a job directing Blood Dragon 3 in Hope County.

== Development ==
The game was developed by Ubisoft Montreal, with Ubisoft Toronto, Ubisoft Kyiv, Ubisoft Shanghai and Ubisoft Reflections offering assistance. Dan Hay, who served as lead producer for Far Cry 3, was the lead director, with writing led by Drew Holmes, who had previously worked on BioShock Infinite and its downloadable content. The game continued the series' practice of using the Dunia 2 engine, a modified version of the CryEngine. The team chose Montana as the game's setting, as the state lies on the frontier of the United States. To create a realistic environment, the development team visited Montana for fourteen days to collect information regarding its biomes, environment, and the "self-reliant" nature of the locals, who do not want any authority or outsider to intervene in their life. The development team had previously carried out a similar research excursion to Nepal during development of Far Cry 4. As the development team was no longer satisfied with having one core antagonist in each game, the cast of antagonists was significantly expanded.

After the release of Far Cry Primal in 2016, Ubisoft stated that the next Far Cry title will take more development time and would not be released in 2017. Far Cry 5 was announced by Ubisoft during the company's financial call, alongside two other major titles, The Crew 2 and Assassin's Creed Origins, which were released in fiscal year 2018. Ubisoft released several teaser trailers and the game's cover art ahead of the game's official reveal on May 26, 2017. The game was released on PlayStation 4, Windows, and Xbox One with support for PlayStation 4 Pro and Xbox One X. Free skin packs were made available for PlayStation 4 players at launch due to a marketing deal between Sony Interactive Entertainment and Ubisoft. Though the game was initially set for release on February 27, 2018, Ubisoft pushed the date back a month to March 27, 2018.

To celebrate the game's five-year anniversary, Ubisoft released an update for the PlayStation 4 and Xbox One versions on March 16, 2023, allowing for 60 frames-per-second gameplay when played using backwards compatibility on PlayStation 5 and Xbox Series X/S.

=== Writing ===
The setting and the tone of the game originated from separatism. According to Hay, he often felt unsafe when he was young because of the conflicts between the two superpowers during the Cold War. This manifested in the twenty-first century in the form of frequent terrorist attacks such as the September 11 attacks, and financial problems such as the subprime mortgage crisis and in turn caused people to become increasingly protective as they questioned the government. Ultimately the concept of the "global village" began to collapse, which sets the theme of the game and prompted the team to write a story that features a doomsday cult as the game's main antagonist. Hay started writing the story in late 2014; in February 2016, he investigated the details of the occupation and standoff of a wildlife refuge in Oregon, as he wanted to look for evidence that can show the rise of separatism. To create a memorable story, the characters in the game were designed to have different views and opinions on important events, and different ideologies. Despite the dark theme, the team wanted to ensure that the game is still fun and entertaining to play. Therefore, the team implemented a large arsenal of weapons and open-ended gameplay possibilities for players to use.

=== Music ===
The music in the game was written and composed by Dan Romer. According to audio director Tony Gronick, the team desired to have music in the background through much of the game world, but wanted it to reflect on the nature of the cult, so that the player would be experiencing the cult's messaging throughout the game, tied to the narrative. To do this, Romer created hymn-like gospel music, but with lyrics that described the cult's end-of-the-world teachings. Further, extending on the idea of multiple antagonists, the style of the music shifts as the player enters regions of the world controlled by the different cult members, from country to glam rock to industrial music, representing how the hymns of Joseph Seed evolve under his siblings' personal preferences. The game also uses licensed music tracks when the player drives in vehicles, with the type of music played similarly influenced by the area they are in. The ambient/post-rock band, Hammock, used some of the songs Romer produced for the game and reinterpreted them. This resulted in a multi-volume soundtrack release, which consists of the original soundtrack and the three-part Far Cry 5 Presents series. Far Cry 5 Presents is a thematic compilation of the additional music used in the game: Into the Flames collects cult songs written by Romer and performed by various artists, When the World Falls is a choral version of those songs, and We Will Rise Again is their ambient reinterpretation by Hammock.

=== Live action short ===
Coinciding with the release of the game, Ubisoft released a live action short film called Inside Eden's Gate. It was produced by Asylum Entertainment. The film serves as a prologue to the events of the game, and follows three filmmakers as they travel across Hope County. They meet Mark and his sister, Linny being taken in by the Eden's Gate cult. It stars Greg Bryk and Kyle Gallner. Ubisoft first made the film available on Amazon Prime, before releasing it on YouTube on April 4, 2018.

== Reception ==
Reception

Aggregate score
Aggregator	Score
Metacritic	XONE: 82/100; PS4: 81/100; PC: 78/100

Review scores
Publication	Score
Destructoid	7.5/10
Edge	6/10
Electronic Gaming Monthly	7.5/10
Game Informer	7.5/10
GameRevolution	3.5/5
GameSpot	9/10
GamesRadar+	4/5
Giant Bomb	3/5
IGN	8.9/10
Polygon	6.5/10

Far Cry 5 received "generally favorable" reviews, according to review aggregator Metacritic.

Daemon Hatfield of IGN gave it an 8.9 out of 10, saying "Far Cry 5 is another wide-open playground with all the necessary ingredients for causing a real ruckus: loads of enemies and allies, temperamental wildlife, and plenty of explosions." Polygon gave the game 6.5 of 10 possible points, stating "It's a shame that Far Cry 5 is propped up by a weak story with bland characters, because behind the plot is an open world filled with what Far Cry as a series does best."

The game's endings polarized critical opinion. Should the player choose "resist" when prompted—an ending regarded by Ubisoft to be canonical—the game depicts a series of nuclear explosions that destroy civilization. If the player chooses to leave, the player character is allowed to leave with their allies, whereupon "Only You" comes on the radio and their classical conditioning forces them to attack their allies. Critics argued that these endings invalidated the player's actions throughout the story by rendering them meaningless.

The tourism board of the state of Montana partnered with Ubisoft after Far Cry 5's release to use some of the setting imagery for the game to promote tourism to the southwestern part of Montana, the setting that inspired the game's fictional Hope County.

Sales

Far Cry 5 became the fastest-selling title in the history of the franchise, more than doubling the sales of Far Cry 4. It was the second-biggest launch of an Ubisoft title, behind Tom Clancy's The Division, grossing $310 million in its first week of sales. The PlayStation 4 version sold 75,474 units within its first week on sale in Japan, placing it at number two on the all format sales chart. In May 2020, Ubisoft revealed that Far Cry 5 (and 10 other games published by them in the 8th console generation) had sold over 10 million units by March 2020.

=== Controversy ===
Many journalists opined that Far Cry 5's setting and narrative concept, involving themes of religious fanaticism and the emergence of far-right political movements within the borders of the United States—as opposed to the more exotic locales depicted in other Far Cry titles—would likely make the game highly controversial. These journalists noted that due to the long development cycle, it was unlikely that Ubisoft intentionally designed the game's narrative around the political climate at the time of the announcement, adding that Ubisoft had been careful to downplay any perceived connections to contemporary events. Responding to the criticism, game director Dan Hay revealed that the story was written to discuss the consequences of beliefs and ideologies being taken to their most extreme form rather than as a response to a particular political event. Hay stated they had come to setting the game around a cult in Montana as they felt Montana reflected a remote frontier most people were not aware of, comparable to their other Far Cry game settings, and that after visiting the state, found that Montana was a place "where people go to be alone, where they don't want to be messed with", further resonating with past Far Cry themes. However, after three years of development, Hay said: "we could have never imagined, and to be honest I wouldn't have wanted to... that in some ways, it's echoing out in the real world."

Following its announcement, Far Cry 5 was the subject of an online petition lodged at Change.org by individuals objecting to what they called the portrayal of American Christians as villains and calling for the game's antagonists to be recast. The petition suggested Muslims, inner-city gang members, and other non-white antagonists as possible replacements. The petition also suggested changing the game's setting to Canada. The petition itself was criticized by industry commentators who highlighted the game's exploration of its themes as being necessary in the contemporary social and political climate, and pointed to video gaming as a medium for social commentary. Some publications also questioned the authenticity of the petition, suggesting that it may have been intended as satire.

Conversely, after the game's release, some outlets criticized it for opposing reasons, for trying to be inoffensive and apolitical rather than directly engaging with contemporary political issues. Polygon's Ben Kuchera described the game as a "defiantly inoffensive mess" which "wants to appeal to everyone, but ultimately says nothing." William Hughes writing for The A.V. Club disparagingly described the villains as an "easily digestible evil" deliberately crafted so as not to offend gamers of any political persuasion. Andrew Webster's The Verge says that the game "creates the illusion that it has something to say, then stubbornly refuses to say anything."

With the release of the sequel Far Cry 6, Ubisoft and the game's writer have confirmed the sequel is "inherently political", creating a continuation of the political controversy within the Far Cry series.

=== Accolades ===
Year	Award	Category	Result	Ref.
2017	Game Critics Awards	Best Action Game	Nominated	
2017	Golden Joystick Awards	Most Wanted Game	Nominated	
2018	Golden Joystick Awards	Best Co-operative Game	Nominated	
2018	The Game Awards 2018	Best Action Game	Nominated	
2018	Gamers' Choice Awards	Fan Favorite Action Game	Nominated	
2018	Gamers' Choice Awards	Fan Favorite Shooter Game	Nominated	
2018	Gamers' Choice Awards	Fan Favorite Male Voice Actor (Greg Bryk)	Nominated	
2018	Titanium Awards	Best Action Game	Won	
2018	Australian Games Awards	Shooter of the Year	Nominated	
2019	New York Game Awards	Tin Pan Alley Award for Best Music in a Game	Nominated	
2019	New York Game Awards	Statue of Liberty Award for Best World	Nominated	
2019	Guild of Music Supervisors Awards	Best Music Supervision in a Video Game	Nominated	
2019	22nd Annual D.I.C.E. Awards	Action Game of the Year	Nominated	
2019	National Academy of Video Game Trade Reviewers Awards	Art Direction, Contemporary	Nominated	
2019	National Academy of Video Game Trade Reviewers Awards	Game, Franchise Action	Nominated	
2019	National Academy of Video Game Trade Reviewers Awards	Song, Original or Adapted ("Help Me Faith")	Nominated	
2019	2019 G.A.N.G. Awards	Audio of the Year	Nominated	
2019	2019 G.A.N.G. Awards	Music of the Year	Nominated	
2019	2019 G.A.N.G. Awards	Best Original Soundtrack Album	Nominated	
2019	2019 G.A.N.G. Awards	Best Cinematic Cutscene Audio	Nominated	
2019	2019 G.A.N.G. Awards	Best Dialogue	Nominated	
2019	2019 G.A.N.G. Awards	Best Original Song ("We Will Rise Again")	Nominated	
2019	2019 G.A.N.G. Awards	Best Original Choral Composition ("Oh the Bliss")	Nominated	
2019	15th British Academy Games Awards	Music	Nominated	
2019	Italian Video Game Awards	People's Choice	Nominated	
2019	Italian Video Game Awards	Game of the Year	Nominated	
