= Joseph Seed =

Video game character

- Far Cry character
- Joseph Seed from Far Cry 5
- First appearance: Far Cry Absolution (2018)
- First game: Far Cry 5 (2018)
- Created by: Ubisoft
- Portrayed by: Greg Bryk

In-universe information
- Family: Jacob Seed (brother); John Seed (brother); Faith Seed/Rachel Jessop (adoptive sister)
- Significant other: Megan (former lover)
- Children: Unnamed daughter Ethan Seed (son)
- Origin: Rome, Georgia, United States
- Nationality: American

Joseph Seed is a fictional character from Ubisoft's Far Cry video game franchise. He appears as the primary antagonist of the 2018 title, Far Cry 5, and was extensively featured in promotional material for the game. In Far Cry 5, Joseph is a charismatic but demented preacher who leads the Project at Eden's Gate, a well-armed doomsday cult and paramilitary group that occupies the fictional Hope County in Montana, United States. He comes into conflict with a group of law enforcement officers who attempt to liberate the county and its residents from the cult's control.

Subsequently, the character appears in the 2019 spin-off Far Cry New Dawn, set 17 years after a possible ending of Far Cry 5, where Hope County is ravaged in the aftermath of a nuclear apocalypse. Joseph serves as the figurehead of New Eden, a successor faction to the original Project at Eden's Gate, and as an ally to the player character. Joseph is also the protagonist of Joseph: Collapse, a post-launch downloadable content pack released for the 2021 title, Far Cry 6. His other appearances include the novel Far Cry Absolution and the live-action short film Far Cry 5: Inside Eden's Gate, both prequels to Far Cry 5; and the third issue of Far Cry: Rite of Passage, a comic book tie-in to Far Cry 6 which further explores the character's backstory.

For the central villain of Far Cry 5, the development team decided to depict a more subtle and insidious form of villainy, which represented a departure from the wild and violent antagonists featured in prior titles. They conducted extensive research into real world cults and their leaders to capture the context of how they would conduct themselves. The team's desire to create a more emotionally-driven villain altered the power structure of Far Cry 5's antagonistic faction and informed the performance of Canadian actor Greg Bryk, who drew from his personal experiences to empathize with Joseph's inner motivation and emotions.

Joseph Seed has received an overall mixed reception; his in-universe role as a cult leader became a point of contention with regards to the controversy surrounding Far Cry 5's themes of religious fanaticism. Still, he is considered one of the best multi-layered antagonists of the series.

== Concept and design ==
Joseph Seed was developed as a different take from other notable villains in the Far Cry series. In a 2021 interview with IGN, Lead Writer of Far Cry 5 Drew Holmes said he wanted to present the central antagonist of Far Cry 5 as a frightening figure without constantly making death threats or pointing a gun at the direction of the player. Holmes emphasized that in order for the character to be believable as a charismatic yet nefarious cult leader, he needs to be "spooky" in temperament as opposed to being outwardly insane or violent like Vaas Montenegro, a popular antagonist from Far Cry 3. The character's distinguishing physical features include a man bun, beard and Aviator shades.

A recreation of the cross-like symbol used by Joseph Seed and his followers

An archetypal cult leader who is worshipped by his devout religious subjects as a higher power, Joseph Seed's role as the "Father" of the Project at Eden's Gate movement was inspired by historical destructive cults like the Peoples Temple, the Manson Family, and the Branch Davidians. As the leader of a religious cult, Joseph Seed surrounds himself with devoted followers, which is meant to be interpreted as overcompensation for his troubled upbringing. To develop his characterization, the team did extensive research and reading for context to develop the way that he holds his gaze, or the way that he writes, or the way that he speaks; according to Far Cry 5 creative director Dan Hay, the final version of Joseph Seed is a composite of numerous historical precedents and personalities. To develop the organization he leads as a believable cult in their role as the antagonistic faction for the story of Far Cry 5, Ubisoft recruited cult specialist Rick Alan Ross as a consultant for the project.

In Ross' view, the essential quality a successful cult leader should have is a charismatic personality or "magnetic pull" that attracts people to their cause. He described Joseph's personality as "nuanced" and "vividly real" like cult leaders that he has met, in that he could come across as someone who has a loving personality and is deeply interested in the individuals he interacts with. As explained by Ross, it is necessary for such leaders to project a non-threatening image for prospective members, but who would then leverage their influence once established to manipulate or undermine the authorities.

=== Portrayal ===
Hay noted that finding the right actor to portray Joseph Seed was essential for the project. He described the casting process as "tricky", and that they "cast the net really wide" to find the right person. The team eventually contacted an agent for Canadian actor Greg Bryk and offered him the opportunity to audition for the role. Bryk initially turned down the offer without a second thought because he did not have any positive expectations for the storytelling potential of the video game medium, as he had not played a video game since childhood. Bryk was eventually convinced to read some prose which was written by Holmes, and changed his mind after having read the character's lines of dialogue from a cutscene. Bryk said Joseph Seed's monologue about his insecurities about being a young father who lacked access to resources or a support system resonated with him, and that it was "so dark and beautiful" in the way it unfolded that he became interested in being involved with the project, and forwarded an audition tape to the developers. Both Hay and Holmes formed a good impression of Bryk's audition tape: Hay found his reading of Joseph Seed's monologue to be "riveting", while Holmes found his performance "chilling".

Bryk felt that what made the character terrifying is that he could reveal a lot of himself and his own truth in the character. In an interview with IGN, he explained that in his view, "the best villains are the most relatable villains, because we all have that darkness in us". For Bryk, the main challenge with approaching the character was to "ground" himself in Joseph Seed as a human being first and then, "let the villainy take care of itself", as in his view each person has "a danger that can come out in the right circumstances". He admitted that he felt highly connected to the material and believed almost every word he uttered in the game, as if he was legitimately preaching the character's sermons, as they were issues that he had thought about in his own private life and that they felt "real and timely and important". Bryk said that there are certain moments in the game's cutscenes where the character appears to address the player directly in his questioning of a "modern world that has gone mad", and noted that the empathetic and reasonable manner which he delivered the lines is intended to unsettle players. Holmes recalled that Bryk fully understood the character of Joseph Seed and that he displayed a lot of empathy for him in spite of his questionable mental state, and believed that their character work would not have been as effective without the qualities Bryk brought to the role.

An important cutscene late in the game's story which took place prior to the final confrontation between Joseph Seed and the player character's allies involve an emotional outburst directed towards the player by the former. The scene was recorded in a studio in Toronto, which is adjacent to a subway that negatively impacts a recording whenever a loud train passes and forces the team to re-record any impacted scenes. Holmes recalled that during the recording of the cutscene, they were aware that a train was about to depart while Bryk is in the middle of performing the monologuing scene, and admitted that they applied pressure on the actor and pushed him to deliver on his performance. Bryk noted that during the cutscene, Joseph displayed the emotional vulnerability of a six year old child who is reliving his trauma of being abandoned, beaten, and abused, and that he is venting at the player character for ending the lives of his loved ones. During the IGN interview, Bryk explained that while he was able to deliver a competent initial reading, with a "vulnerability and emotion to it that was right", he felt that it was missing an element that could made it special and take it to the next level emotionally. Soon after Bryk took a break from recording and walked away from his chair, he recollected a negative memory from his past, an experience he described as a "very dark black rose" which "bloomed" in him. As the team resumed recording, he launched into the monologue in the form of a tirade, with tears and snot flowing from his face. He recounted that the studio fell silent as the recording ended, which was when the train went past. Holmes and Hay were both impressed by Bryk's intensity in that take, with the latter instructing the renderers who were present that the entirety of Bryk's performance should be captured in minute detail and not be "sanitized" in any way.

== Appearances ==
=== Far Cry 5 ===
==== Early life ====
Joseph's early life is shrouded in mystery, but what is known is that Joseph was raised in an abusive household alongside his younger brother John and older brother Jacob. From his dialogue after John's death, it implies that the family was rather happy up until a tragic event tore them apart, leading the parents to abuse the three children, primarily John.

==== Hearing god's plan ====
Later in life, Joseph married a woman and had a daughter with her. By Joseph's own words, he was terrified of being a father, presumably hoping not to turn out like his own. One day, while on the way to visit her friend, Joseph's wife was in a car crash with their daughter, killing her and leaving the daughter in the hospital. Upon hearing of this, Joseph, told by the hospital orderlies to look after her, went to his daughter to pray with her. During their prayers, Joseph claims to have "realized God's plan", and suffocated his own daughter to death. Joseph came to the conclusion that the world was coming to an end, and that God had chosen him to save people from the coming Collapse.

==== Foundation of Eden's Gate ====
Joseph would come to become the founder and leader of the Project at Eden's Gate, a paramilitary doomsday cult based in Hope County, a fictional rural county in the U.S. state of Montana, who use torture, coercion, and a drug called Bliss to force people to join them. Throughout the game, it is revealed Joseph has claimed various military silos as bunkers to wait out the Collapse. Besides Joseph himself, the cult is run by his three "heralds": John, a sociopathic lawyer who helped to claim property for the cult and who helps to indoctrinate people via "the Power of Yes"; Jacob, a former army sniper responsible for training the cult by "culling the herd", and producing specially-trained wolves called Judges; and "Faith", a woman responsible for producing a hallucinogenic drug called "The Bliss" and turning various people into zombie-esque Angels. It is later revealed that "Faith" is a title held in the cult, with the latest woman to hold it being a young woman named Rachel (not to be confused with Rachel Jessop), whom Joseph apparently saved from suicide and got addicted to Bliss.

==== In-game appearances ====
At the beginning of the game, footage is leaked of Joseph gouging a man's eyes out after attempting to film proof of the cult's danger. This leads to Sheriff Whitehorse, his deputies, and U.S. Marshal Cameron Burke attempting to arrest Seed at his base of operations. When they confront Seed, the cult leader cooperates, but proclaims that "God will not let you take me." While attempting to take Seed away, the helicopter is attacked by various cultists, one of whom jumps into the propellers, causing it to crash and Seed to escape. Seed, interpreting the attempt at arrest as the first sign of the Collapse, takes all but a junior deputy (the player character) and the marshal, who manage to escape, and block off communication to the outside world.

Seed appears at one point throughout each region: in John's region, Joseph arrives while John is sadistically drowning the Deputy, chastising him for letting his sin get the better of him, believing the deputy is not above salvation, and leaving him in John's hands. In Faith's region, Joseph appears in a bliss-induced hallucination, attempting to justify his actions by pointing out the decaying state of the world, and claiming he was chosen by God. In Jacob's region, Joseph appears to a captured Deputy, and explains his backstory of killing his daughter, proclaiming that the deputy must make a similar sacrifice, as "the lord giveth and the lord taketh." After Jacob, John, and Faith are killed, Joseph has an emotional breakdown, and comes to the conclusion that God's plan is for his old family to die so that he may accept the Deputy and their friends as his own, and invites them back to his church for a final confrontation. At the church the game started in, Joseph reveals he has captured all the Deputy's allies, and brainwashed most of them, offering the deputy to leave with his friends should he never come back.

==== Endings ====
The branching narrative of Far Cry 5 includes multiple endings as a result of how the player decides to deal with Joseph Seed. The player has the option to make a game-altering decision early in the narrative by disobeying Burke's order to arrest Joseph, and depart from Hope County along with their colleagues. The player may also decide not to escalate their character's conflict with the cult during the final confrontation at Joseph's compound and leave Hope County to its fate, though it is implied that the deputy's prior brainwashing engineered by Jacob Seed is still intact. Finally, the third ending of the game sees Hope County being devastated by a nuclear warhead shortly after Joseph is defeated in battle, the "Collapse" he had foreseen and tried to prevent. Both Joseph and the deputy survive the nuclear devastation and hide together within a fallout shelter for an indeterminate number of years. Joseph tells the deputy that they are the only family he has left and "adopts" them as a surrogate child.

=== Far Cry New Dawn ===
A clip showing him yelling "Release me! Release me!" after the player character walks away.

==== Post-Holocaust life ====
Far Cry New Dawn takes place seventeen years after the nuclear conflict ending of Far Cry 5, which is implied to have devastated not only Hope County, but the rest of the world as well. Alongside the junior deputy, now his personal "Judge", Joseph Seed has gathered a new group of devout followers who reside in New Eden, a settlement based in the north of post-apocalyptic Hope County. Unlike their predecessor, the New Eden cult eschew all trappings of modernity and maintains an isolationist outlook as opposed to aggressive expansionism, and Joseph himself is a seemingly changed man. By the events of New Dawn, Joseph has vanished, leaving his biological son Ethan Seed to take over as the leader of New Eden while he has secretly retreated to a secluded sanctuary to the north of Hope County.

=== Far Cry 6 ===
==== The Collapse ====
Joseph makes his first appearance as a playable character in a post-launch downloadable content expansion for Far Cry 6 titled Joseph: Collapse, released on February 8, 2022. Collapse takes place in a dream sequence, where Joseph is tormented by a mysterious Voice, as well as those of his family, for leaving them behind while he hid from "the Collapse". Journeying through a destroyed Hope County, Joseph frees the "souls" of his family: John, Jacob, and Faith, while recovering pieces of his cross. Afterwards, Joseph attempts to cross Eden's Gate, but the Voice prevents him, challenging him to fight endless waves of enemies to prove that he's a changed man. Joseph succeeds in surviving the onslaught, and the Voice forgives his past sins. A phone message plays afterwards, in which Joseph tries to call his wife, the first Faith, who is revealed to be pregnant with their child.

=== Other appearances ===
A novel titled Far Cry Absolution, written by Urban Waite and released on February 27, 2018, marks the character's first appearance in Far Cry franchise media. The novel details events which occur prior to Far Cry 5, and explores the backstory of his involvement with the circumstances surrounding the death of Fall's End resident Mary May Fairgrave's father, as well as her brother's defection to the Project at Eden's Gate.

A live-action short film titled Far Cry 5: Inside Eden's Gate, which stars Greg Bryk as Joseph Seed, serves as another tie-in prequel to Far Cry 5. Released on March 5, 2018, the film follows a group of vloggers set on researching the Project at Eden's Gate. In one scene, Joseph Seed and his followers invades the congregation of Pastor Jerome Jeffries, brings his congregation out and into Eden’s Gate, and, eventually, killed a young woman in a baptism. The film shows that Pastor Jerome's congregation have watched on and followed the cult after Joseph Seed killed her.

Joseph appears in the tie-in comic series Far Cry: Rite of Passage published by Dark Horse Comics, which sees Far Cry 6 villain Antón Castillo recounting cautionary tales to his son Diego. One of the stories is a recount of Joseph's backstory, from his childhood years to the events that led to his founding of the Project at Eden's Gate.

== Promotion and reception ==
Ubisoft released a number promotional trailers which featured Joseph Seed to promote Far Cry 5. Joseph Seed's likeness had been used for a number of merchandise. The limited Far Cry 5: Father Edition includes a figurine of the character preaching before a mural. A 32 cm figurine of the character titled " The Father's Calling", which depicts him shirtless and raising a gun with his arm, was launched as a standalone purchase in March 2018.

Joseph Seed's appearance in Far Cry 5 drew a positive reaction from critics. IGN staff gave a positive assessment of the character, as he is presented by Ubisoft as a realistically disturbing villain who exudes an "absorbing and chilling presence" instead of the "edge-of-your-seat theatrics" that characterized prior series antagonists, and that he has also earned his place in the "bad guy hall of fame". Dais Johnston from Inverse found Far Cry 5 to be a "chillingly accurate mind control story", and that players could sympathize enough with Joseph to be engaged, but not so much that they would side with the cult. For his performance as Joseph Seed in Far Cry 5, Greg Bryk received a nomination for Fan Favorite Male Voice Actor at the Gamers' Choice Awards in 2018. On the other hand, Game Informer staff found Joseph Seed and his family to be forgettable antagonists when compared to Vaas or Far Cry 4's Pagan Min. Javy Gwaltney in particular was disappointed that Far Cry 5 does not fully explore the "terror and paranoia it supposedly seeks to inspire" with its controversial premise, and claimed that the game offered no evidence which demonstrates that the character of Joseph Seed is genuinely charismatic and terrifying beyond a slogan often repeated by other non-player characters.

Some critics have discussed the character within the context of historical cult movements and far-right politics in the United States. Kai Bailey from US Gamer remarked that while Seed and his cult obliquely referenced American politics during the presidency of Donald Trump, their demagoguery stayed seemingly apolitical throughout the story of Far Cry 5. Colin Campbell from Polygon opined that Joseph Seed is a recognizable albeit exaggerated part of American political culture, a "guns-and-Bible demagogue who cites scripture often, and speaks in apocalyptic terms", with the iconography employed by his cult co-opted from real-life white supremacy movements. Joseph's fanaticism reminded Campbell of Roy Moore's unsuccessful attempts to run for the U.S. Senate, and his appeals to voters who subscribe to far-right politics and religious conservatism for their support. Johnston observed that Joseph's penchant of quoting from the biblical Book of Revelation and use of the military opposition to bolster belief in his prophecies echoed David Koresh's modus operandi, while his "piercing gaze and charismatic ways" as he recounted the disturbing manner in which he killed his own newborn daughter reminded him of Jim Jones and the Jonestown incident. Writing for Fanbyte, John Warren was particularly impressed by how the developers captured the facial stillness of Koresh, who also had distinctive eyewear, in Joseph Seed.

In a preview article for Far Cry New Dawn, Zoe Delahunty-Light from GamesRadar said she was intrigued by Joseph's depiction as an ally to the player's faction in spite of his past. Nevertheless, she personally loathed the character and said she looked forwarded to the opportunity to kill the character because of his heinous actions in Far Cry 5. Campbell criticized the fatherhood-themed story of New Dawn and focused his criticism on Joseph in particular, an "unhinged, authoritarian father who emotionally poisons his child", and "who somehow acts as a conduit for the game’s musings on parenthood". He described the character's arc as a "collection of tired tropes and clichés" and a "dog’s dinner of daddy-stories" which have nothing of substance to say.

Chris Shive from Hardcore Gamer gave a positive review of Far Cry 6: Joseph: Collapse. He praised the character as a memorable villain and learning more about his backstory is a worthwhile experience provided by the DLC. Conversely, Travis Northup from IGN called Joseph one of "the weaker villains from the series’ otherwise iconic lineup" and questioned the creative decision to present Joseph as a repentant person in the storyline of Collapse.

== See also ==
- New religious movements and cults in popular culture
