= Far Cry New Dawn =

2019 video game

- Cover art featuring antagonists Mickey (right) and Lou (left)
- Developer: Ubisoft Montreal
- Publisher: Ubisoft
- Directors: Jean-Sebastien Decant; Patrik Methe
- Producer: Sebastien Ebacher
- Designer: Rodolphe Recca
- Programmer: Raphaël Parent
- Artist: Isaac Papismado
- Writer: Russell Lees
- Composers: Tyler Bates; John Swihart
- Series: Far Cry
- Engine: Dunia 2
- Platforms: PlayStation 4; Windows; Xbox One; Stadia
- Release: February 15, 2019; Stadia; November 3, 2020
- Genres: Action-adventure, first-person shooter
- Modes: Single-player, multiplayer

Far Cry New Dawn is a 2019 first-person shooter video game developed by Ubisoft Montreal and published by Ubisoft. It is a spin-off and sequel to Far Cry 5, and the eleventh overall installment in the Far Cry series. Set seventeen years after one of the possible endings of Far Cry 5, which saw the fictional Hope County, Montana, being devastated by a nuclear exchange known as "the Collapse", the game follows a group of survivors as they attempt to rebuild their community and defeat a gang of vicious bandits. Players assume the role of an unnamed security captain who, like Far Cry 5's deputy sheriff, is silent and highly customizable.

Far Cry New Dawn retains most of the series' gameplay elements, including a large open world modeled after Far Cry 5's map, AI or co-op companions, and the capturing of enemy outposts. It also introduces several elements from the role-playing genre, such as an upgradeable home base and increased reliance on crafting items from limited supplies.

The game was released worldwide for the PlayStation 4, Windows, and Xbox One on February 15, 2019. It received generally mixed reviews, with praise for its gameplay and criticism for its narrative and similarities to Far Cry 5, and had lower sales than both Far Cry 5 and Far Cry Primal.

== Gameplay ==
Far Cry New Dawn is set in Montana after a nuclear war, utilizing a reimagined version of Far Cry 5's map.

Similar to its predecessors, Far Cry New Dawn is an action-adventure first-person shooter set in an open world environment which the player can explore freely on foot or via various vehicles. The game is set in the fictional Hope County, Montana, and uses a reimagined version of Far Cry 5's map. The nuclear war portrayed in Far Cry 5 has reshaped the landscape so that new areas have become available for the player to explore while others are inaccessible. The flora and fauna of Hope County have also undergone changes, with the landscape dominated by colourful flowers and occupied by mutated animals. Even the sky above Hope County has changed, with a permanent aurora that hints at a significant change to the Earth's magnetic field.

The player assumes the role of a new character, whose gender and ethnicity can be customized. The Guns for Hire and the Fangs for Hire systems from Far Cry 5 return, with the character being able to recruit human survivors and animals for combat assistance. In addition to new characters, the game's cast includes an array of returning characters from Far Cry 5. The player character can also encounter several specialists who have their own personal missions, special abilities and story and help players to repair their weapons. New weapons are introduced in the game, including a "Saw Launcher" that fires the blades of circular saws. Players acquire new weapons and attachments, which can be upgraded to three different levels through crafting and finishing missions. Vehicles can also be crafted.

Players can embark on treasure hunts and liberate different enemy encampments and outposts. Once liberated, they become fast travel points that enable players to quickly navigate the world. These outposts can be occupied and used to manufacture ethanol fuel or raided for resources which leaves the outpost open to "escalation", in which the Highwaymen may reclaim these camps. This allows the player to replay the outposts on higher difficulty settings. The game also features an upgradable home base named Prosperity, which slowly expands and grows in size as players progress. The game also features a mode called "Expeditions", which allows the player to travel to other locations in the United States such as Louisiana to look for more resources and packages. As these regions are outside the main map and smaller in size, the development team was able to create more complex environments for Expeditions. Expedition missions can be completed with other players.

== Synopsis ==
=== Setting ===
The story is set seventeen years after one of the possible endings of Far Cry 5. After the nuclear exchange known as "the Collapse" devastated the world, survivors attempt to rebuild the community in Hope County. Their efforts focus on Prosperity, a township built on the remains of John Seed's ranch. The survivors are threatened by the Highwaymen, a roving band of organized bandits. The Highwaymen are organised into chapters, with the local chapter led by twin sisters Mickey and Lou (voiced by Cara Ricketts and Leslie Miller). The Highwaymen terrorize the landscape, forcing survivors into submission and stripping communities of resources before moving on. The remnants of the Project at Eden's Gate—the antagonists of Far Cry 5—have established their own community called New Eden. They have given up most forms of modern technology and isolated themselves in the north of Hope County. Despite embracing Joseph Seed's teachings, New Eden is wracked by internal division that arose after Joseph's disappearance. The game also features the return of the Deputy, now one of Joseph's acolytes known as the Judge, and Joseph Seed (Greg Bryk), the protagonist and main antagonist of Far Cry 5 respectively. The player takes on the role of a new character dubbed the "Security Captain", who is part of a group that travels the country assisting other survivor groups in need.

Far Cry New Dawn uses a smaller version of the Hope County map featured in Far Cry 5. Large sections of northern and eastern Hope County are inaccessible after being irradiated. Some parts of the north can be accessed over the course of the story campaign. Many of the individual locations from Far Cry 5 have been redesigned, either having been reclaimed by nature or repurposed by the Highwaymen. Some of these locations have new areas for the player to explore, such as cave systems, bunkers or buildings.

=== Plot ===
In 2035, after Hope County and the rest of the world has been left devastated by a nuclear war, the survivors that had taken shelter underground begin to emerge and rebuild society. The Hope County survivors found the settlement of Prosperity, but are soon attacked by the Highwaymen. Desperate for help, Carmina Rye (Reina Hardesty), the daughter of Nick (Steve Byers) and Kim Rye (Mayko Nguyen), appeals for help from Thomas Rush (Patrick Garrow), the leader of a group rebuilding communities across America. Rush and the Captain answer the call, but they are ambushed by the Highwaymen and confronted by Mickey (Cara Ricketts) and Lou (Leslie Miller), the twin sisters who lead them. The Twins attempt to forcibly recruit Rush, but he refuses and pushes the Captain into a nearby river.

Carmina pulls the Captain from the river and informs them that the Twins have left with Rush in their custody. Carmina and the Captain travel to Hope County to receive guidance from Kim, who encourages them to travel around Hope County, unite scattered survivors, and build up Prosperity to a level where they can fend off the Highwaymen. The Captain heads out to secure resources and specialists for Prosperity, and manages to rescue Rush. Angered at Prosperity's defiance, the Highwaymen retaliate and attack the settlement, causing serious damage and casualties. With Prosperity in no condition to survive another attack, Rush suggests forming an alliance with another survivor group, the New Eden group led by Joseph Seed (Greg Bryk). Kim is reluctant to trust Joseph, but Carmina is confident that he is a changed man.

With no other choice, the Captain heads out to negotiate with New Eden. They recover the Book, Joseph's personal bible, and turn it in to Ethan (Kyle Gatehouse), New Eden's current ruler and Joseph's son. Ethan reveals that Joseph had disappeared long ago and he is bitter over his abandonment. He then agrees to an alliance with Prosperity on the condition that the Captain bring back proof of Joseph's death. The Captain travels north following Joseph's trail and finds him living as a hermit in the wilderness. Joseph welcomes the Captain as a prophesied savior and reveals that in the aftermath of the nuclear war, he has done his best to atone for his past actions. Joseph offers the Captain an apple from a sacred tree, which triggers a powerful hallucination where the Captain is forced to battle a bestial personification of their own soul. Upon defeating the beast and waking up, the Captain returns to New Eden with Joseph with abilities called Eden's Gift. Against Ethan's wishes, Joseph designates the Captain as New Eden's shepherd, and commits his forces, among them being the Judge, the Deputy from the previous game who is hiding their identity out of shame and guilt over Hope County's destruction, to fight the Highwaymen.

Meanwhile, Rush is captured by the Highwaymen again, but as the Captain goes to save him, the Twins execute him. This triggers Eden's Gift, giving the Captain superhuman strength and allowing them to beat the Twins until getting knocked out by a shotgun blast. Believing the Captain to be dead, the Twins decide to investigate New Eden about the source of the Captain's strength. The Captain recovers Rush's body and buries him at Prosperity. To find out what the Twins are planning next, the Captain infiltrates a Highwaymen meeting, where they discover Ethan has decided to betray New Eden, promising to show the Twins the location of the sacred fruit in return for burning down New Eden. The Captain confronts the Twins at New Eden and defeats them, resulting in Lou's death and a repentant Mickey either being executed or spared. Meanwhile, Ethan ignores Joseph's warnings and eats one of the sacred apples, but it triggers an inhuman transformation in his body, forcing the Captain to kill him. Realizing his actions only bring death and destruction, Joseph burns down the sacred tree and pleads for the Captain to kill him, which the Captain may choose to do or not. If the Captain does, the burning tree begins to snap apart immediately. If not, Joseph is left wailing for release while the Captain leaves (if the area is subsequently returned to, Joseph has disappeared).

Returning to Prosperity, the Captain celebrates their victory with Carmina at Rush's grave, as Carmina states that despite the hardships and losses, there is hope for the future after all.

== Development ==
New Dawn is developed by Ubisoft Montreal in conjunction with Ubisoft Kyiv, Ubisoft Bucharest and Ubisoft Shanghai. According to art director Issac Papismado, the team had wanted to create a post-apocalyptic game set in the Far Cry series for a long time. The team intentionally avoided a dark and bleak tone as they felt that it would be a cliché and resolved to create a world that looks vibrant. Set seventeen years after Far Cry 5, the world is undergoing a "super bloom" in which nature reclaims the world and gives the game a vibrant colour palette. To give Highwaymen a visual identity, the team invited Montreal artist Zilon to create the game's art and graffiti. Similar to Far Cry 3: Blood Dragon and Far Cry Primal, the game is a smaller production when compared to the series' main entries, a decision reflected by the game's lower launch price. The game runs on the Dunia 2 engine.

Announced at The Game Awards 2018, the game was released for PlayStation 4, Windows, and Xbox One on February 15, 2019.

In February 2025, an update that improved performance and allowed the game to run at 60 frames per second on the PlayStation 5 and Xbox Series X/S was released for the PlayStation 4 and Xbox One versions.

== Reception ==
Reception

Aggregate scores
Aggregator	Score
Metacritic	(PC) 73/100 (PS4) 71/100 (XONE) 75/100
OpenCritic	54% recommend

Review scores
Publication	Score
Destructoid	8/10
Edge	6/10
Electronic Gaming Monthly	2/5
Game Informer	7/10
GameSpot	6/10
GamesRadar+	4/5
IGN	7.5/10
Jeuxvideo.com	14/20
PlayStation Official Magazine – UK	7/10
Official Xbox Magazine (UK)	8/10
PC Gamer (US)	70/100
USgamer	4/5

Far Cry New Dawn received "mixed or average" reviews for the PlayStation 4 and PC versions and "generally favorable reviews" for the Xbox One version, according to review aggregator platform Metacritic. Fellow review aggregator OpenCritic assessed that the game received fair approval, being recommended by 54% of critics.

PC Gamer's reviewer points out similarities with other Far Cry games ("Combat is the same frantic and fun gunplay as in the past few Far Cry games"), especially Far Cry 5 ("This is Far Cry 5 again, just on a smaller scale and with more pink flowers"). VG247 reviewer also notes reusage of Far Cry 5 material, but claims that the game "introduces enough new ideas and winning missions to make its apocalyptic mark just about worth it". Daemon Hatfield, writing for IGN, gave the game a 7.5/10 score, with the review summary: "Ubisoft could've done more to refresh Hope County for Far Cry: New Dawn, but there's still some good, chaotic fun to be had here." Alyse Stanley of Polygon criticised the game's narrative dissonance but said it worked well as an "anarchic sandbox" with satisfying gameplay and "hilarious" random encounters.

=== Sales ===
In Japan, 26,285 physical units were sold during its launch week. It was the best-selling retail game in the UK in its week of release according to Chart-Track, though its sales were significantly lower than Far Cry 5 and the previous spin-off in the series, Far Cry Primal. It was the second best-selling retail game in Switzerland during its week of release.

=== Awards ===
The game was nominated for the Tin Pan Alley Award for Best Music in a Game at the New York Game Awards, and for "Original Dramatic Score, Franchise" and "Performance in a Drama, Lead" with Cara Ricketts at the NAVGTR Awards.
