= List of Ubisoft Montreal video games =

This is a list of video games developed by Ubisoft Montreal.

== List ==
Year	Game	Platform(s)
1998	Laura's Happy Adventures	Microsoft Windows
1998	Speed Busters	Microsoft Windows, Dreamcast
1999	Alex Builds His Farm	Microsoft Windows
1999	Hype: The Time Quest	Microsoft Windows, PlayStation 2
1999	Tonic Trouble	Nintendo 64, Microsoft Windows
2000	Donald Duck: Goin' Quackers	PlayStation 2, GameCube
2000	The Jungle Book Groove Party	Microsoft Windows, PlayStation, PlayStation 2
2001	Batman: Vengeance	PlayStation 2, Game Boy Advance, GameCube, Xbox, Microsoft Windows
2001	Tarzan: Untamed	PlayStation 2, GameCube
2002	Tom Clancy's Splinter Cell^{[A]}	Xbox, Microsoft Windows, PlayStation 2, GameCube, Mac OS X, PlayStation 3
2003	Tom Clancy's Rainbow Six 3: Raven Shield	Microsoft Windows, Mac OS X
2003	Tom Clancy's Rainbow Six 3	Xbox, PlayStation 2, GameCube
2003	Batman: Rise of Sin Tzu	Xbox, PlayStation 2, Game Boy Advance, GameCube
2003	Prince of Persia: The Sands of Time^{[B]}	Game Boy Advance, Xbox, PlayStation 2, GameCube, Microsoft Windows, PlayStation 3
2004	Myst IV: Revelation	Mac OS X, Microsoft Windows, Xbox
2004	Prince of Persia: Warrior Within^{[B]}	Xbox, PlayStation 2, GameCube, Microsoft Windows, PlayStation Portable, iOS, PlayStation 3
2004	Star Wars Trilogy: Apprentice of the Force	Game Boy Advance
2004	Tom Clancy's Rainbow Six 3: Black Arrow	Xbox
2005	Far Cry Instincts	Xbox
2005	Prince of Persia: The Two Thrones^{[B]}	Xbox, PlayStation 2, GameCube, Microsoft Windows, PlayStation Portable, Wii, Mac OS X, PlayStation 3
2005	Tom Clancy's Splinter Cell: Chaos Theory^{[A]}^{[C]}	Xbox, PlayStation 2, Microsoft Windows, GameCube, Nintendo 3DS, PlayStation 3
2006	Far Cry: Instincts – Evolution	Xbox
2006	Far Cry: Instincts – Predator	Xbox 360
2006	Open Season	Xbox, PlayStation 2, GameCube, Microsoft Windows, Game Boy Advance, Nintendo DS, PlayStation Portable, Xbox 360, Wii
2006	Tom Clancy's Splinter Cell: Essentials	PlayStation Portable
2006	Tom Clancy's Splinter Cell: Double Agent	Xbox, PlayStation 2, GameCube, Wii
2006	Tom Clancy's Rainbow Six: Vegas	Xbox 360, Microsoft Windows, PlayStation 3, PlayStation Portable
2006	Far Cry Vengeance	Wii
2007	TMNT	Microsoft Windows, Xbox 360, PlayStation 2, GameCube, Game Boy Advance, Nintendo DS, PlayStation Portable
2007	Assassin's Creed	Xbox 360, PlayStation 3, Microsoft Windows
2007	My Word Coach	Nintendo DS, Wii, iOS
2007	Naruto: Rise of a Ninja	Xbox 360
2008	Lost: Via Domus	Xbox 360, PlayStation 3, Microsoft Windows
2008	Tom Clancy's Rainbow Six: Vegas 2	Xbox 360, PlayStation 3, Microsoft Windows
2008	Far Cry 2	Xbox 360, PlayStation 3, Microsoft Windows
2008	Shaun White Snowboarding	Nintendo DS, PlayStation Portable, Wii, Xbox 360, PlayStation 3, PlayStation 2, Microsoft Windows, Mac OS X
2008	Naruto: The Broken Bond	Xbox 360
2008	Prince of Persia	Xbox 360, PlayStation 3, Microsoft Windows, Mac OS X
2009	Assassin's Creed II	Xbox 360, PlayStation 3, Microsoft Windows, Mac OS X, PlayStation 4, Xbox One, Nintendo Switch
2009	James Cameron's Avatar: The Game	Xbox 360, PlayStation 3, Microsoft Windows, Wii, Nintendo DS, PlayStation Portable
2009	Shaun White Snowboarding: World Stage	Wii
2010	Tom Clancy's Splinter Cell: Conviction	Xbox 360, Microsoft Windows, Mac OS X
2010	Prince of Persia: The Forgotten Sands	Xbox 360, PlayStation 3, Microsoft Windows
2010	Scott Pilgrim vs the World: The Game	PlayStation 3, Xbox 360, Nintendo Switch, PlayStation 4, Microsoft Windows, Xbox One, Google Stadia
2010	Shaun White Skateboarding	Microsoft Windows, Xbox 360, PlayStation 3, Wii
2010	Assassin's Creed: Brotherhood	Xbox 360, PlayStation 3, Microsoft Windows, Mac OS X, PlayStation 4, Xbox One, Nintendo Switch
2011	Just Dance 3	Xbox 360
2011	Michael Jackson: The Experience	Xbox 360
2011	Assassin's Creed: Revelations	Xbox 360, PlayStation 3, Microsoft Windows, PlayStation 4, Xbox One, Nintendo Switch
2012	Assassin's Creed III	Xbox 360, PlayStation 3, Wii U, Microsoft Windows, PlayStation 4, Xbox One, Nintendo Switch, Google Stadia
2012	Far Cry 3	Xbox 360, PlayStation 3, Microsoft Windows, PlayStation 4, Xbox One
2012	Just Dance: Greatest Hits	Xbox 360
2013	Far Cry 3: Blood Dragon	Xbox 360, PlayStation 3, Microsoft Windows, PlayStation 4, Xbox One, Google Stadia
2013	Assassin's Creed IV: Black Flag	Xbox 360, PlayStation 3, Wii U, PlayStation 4, Microsoft Windows, Xbox One, Nintendo Switch, Google Stadia
2014	Child of Light	PlayStation 3, PlayStation 4, Xbox 360, Xbox One, Wii U, Microsoft Windows, PlayStation Vita, Nintendo Switch, Google Stadia
2014	Watch Dogs	PlayStation 3, PlayStation 4, Xbox 360, Xbox One, Microsoft Windows, Wii U, Google Stadia
2014	Shape Up	Xbox One
2014	Assassin's Creed Unity	PlayStation 4, Xbox One, Microsoft Windows
2014	Far Cry 4	PlayStation 3, PlayStation 4, Xbox 360, Xbox One, Microsoft Windows
2015	The Mighty Quest for Epic Loot	Microsoft Windows, Android, iOS
2015	Tom Clancy's Rainbow Six Siege	PlayStation 4, Xbox One, Microsoft Windows, PlayStation 5, Xbox Series X/S, Google Stadia
2016	Far Cry Primal	PlayStation 4, Xbox One, Microsoft Windows, Google Stadia
2016	Eagle Flight	Microsoft Windows, PlayStation 4
2016	Watch Dogs 2	PlayStation 4, Xbox One, Microsoft Windows, Google Stadia
2017	For Honor	PlayStation 4, Xbox One, Microsoft Windows
2017	Assassin's Creed Origins	PlayStation 4, Xbox One, Microsoft Windows, Google Stadia
2018	Far Cry 5	PlayStation 4, Xbox One, Microsoft Windows, Google Stadia
2018	Transference	PlayStation 4, Xbox One, Microsoft Windows
2019	Far Cry New Dawn	PlayStation 4, Xbox One, Microsoft Windows, Google Stadia
2020	Hyper Scape	PlayStation 4, Xbox One, Microsoft Windows
2020	Assassin's Creed Valhalla	PlayStation 4, PlayStation 5, Xbox One, Xbox Series X/S, Microsoft Windows, Google Stadia
2022	Tom Clancy's Rainbow Six Extraction	PlayStation 4, PlayStation 5, Xbox One, Xbox Series X/S, Microsoft Windows, Google Stadia
2022	Roller Champions	PlayStation 4, Xbox One, Microsoft Windows, Nintendo Switch
2026	Tom Clancy's Rainbow Six Mobile	Android, iOS
TBA	Assassin's Creed: Project Hexe	PlayStation 5, Xbox Series X/S, Microsoft Windows
Notes^{A} These games were developed for the PS3 as part of the Tom Clancy's Splinter Cell Trilogy.^{B} These games were developed for the PS3 as part of the Prince of Persia Trilogy.^{C} The 3DS version of Tom Clancy's Splinter Cell: Chaos Theory is entitled Tom Clancy's Splinter Cell 3D.
