= Trigen =

Trigen can refer to:

- Trigeneration, a variant of cogeneration where the same fuel is used for power generation, heating and cooling
- Trigen Energy Corp., a U.S. district energy and CHP company operating as Veolia Energy North America since February 2011
- Trigens, creatures in the video game Far Cry
