= Far Cry 2 =

2008 video game

- Developer: Ubisoft Montreal (Note: Mobile version developed by Gameloft)
- Publisher: Ubisoft (Note: Mobile version published by Gameloft. Japanese Windows release published by E Frontier.)
- Director: Clint Hocking
- Producers: Bertrand Hélias; Louis-Pierre Pharand
- Designer: Pierre Rivest
- Programmers: Dominic Guay; Patrice Zink
- Artist: Alexandre Amancio
- Writers: Armand Constantine; Clint Hocking; Kevin Shortt; Patrick Redding; Susan O'Connor
- Composer: Marc Canham
- Series: Far Cry
- Engine: Dunia
- Platforms: Microsoft Windows; PlayStation 3; Xbox 360; Mobile phone
- Release: NA: October 21, 2008; AU: October 23, 2008; EU: October 24, 2008
- Genre: First-person shooter
- Modes: Single-player, multiplayer

Far Cry 2 is a 2008 first-person shooter developed by Ubisoft Montreal and published by Ubisoft for Microsoft Windows, PlayStation 3 and Xbox 360. A top-down shooter version for mobile phones was developed and published by Gameloft. It is the second mainline entry in the Far Cry series. Set in a fictional African country engulfed in civil war, the storyline follows a mercenary who is assigned to kill the Jackal, a weapons dealer inflaming the conflict. The player navigates the open world, completing missions for factions and allies called Buddies while managing their health and equipment. A competitive multiplayer mode allows players to fight in teams or as individuals.

Production took three and a half years, with concept work beginning during the production of Far Cry Instincts (2005). Director Clint Hocking conceived the setting and design, which he wanted to be more realistic than the original Far Cry (2004). The narrative and tone, inspired by Joseph Conrad's novella Heart of Darkness and Dashiell Hammett's novel Red Harvest, focused on the lengths to which people would go to survive through terrible circumstances. The game was built using Dunia, a game engine created by Ubisoft based on the original game's CryEngine. In pursuit of realism, the developers added real-time and reactive elements for enemies and the environment. The music, composed by Marc Canham, includes vocals by Senegalese singer Baaba Maal.

Far Cry 2 received positive reviews from critics, with praise for its setting, open-ended gameplay, Buddies, world design and visuals; however, its writing, artificial intelligence and technical issues received negative attention. It received multiple game award nominations. By January 2009, the game had sold nearly three million copies worldwide. Far Cry 2 has continued to receive attention for its ambition and survival mechanics. The team used feedback from the game to develop Far Cry 3 (2012).

== Gameplay ==
Gameplay from a mission in Far Cry 2; the mercenary aims at enemies in a base.

Far Cry 2 is a first-person shooter in which players take control of a mercenary in an unnamed fictional African nation in the middle of a civil war. The playable character is selected from a pool of nine available mercenaries; the remaining eight and some other non-playable mercenary characters are distributed through the world once the game starts. The environment covers a variety of terrain, ranging from desert to savannah to jungle. The mercenary has access to a selection of thirty firearms including pistols, assault rifles, rocket launchers, sniper rifles, and mortars. He can also use a machete for melee kills. Many missions in Far Cry 2 involve storming or infiltrating encampments, many of which contain supplies. The mercenary can adopt a frontal assault, or approach and carry out their mission using stealth, in addition to there being a number of different options within these approaches for completing a mission.

After the opening tutorial area, the mercenary is allowed to roam freely through the game's open world environment, completing main story missions and side missions for both the game's major factions and a third independent group, the Underground, in neutral town areas. The other playable (and some notable non-playable) mercenaries found in the open world are dubbed Buddies, and can be either found in settlements or held captive by one of the factions. Depending on interactions, players have a Best and Second Best Buddy, who when a mission is accepted will call up to offer optional information and support in combat. If Buddies are injured on missions and not healed in time, they die and will be permanently removed from the rest of the game. The player can save their progress in safe houses captured from enemy forces; the PlayStation 3 (PS3) and Xbox 360 (360) versions only allow saves in safe houses, while the Microsoft Windows version allows the player to save anywhere. At safe houses, the mercenary can rest and advance the in-game time using his watch.

The player's health is represented by a bar showing five sections, each of which gradually regenerates unless depleted completely. Once health drops to one bar, a critical state is entered and the heal function triggers a cutscene where the mercenary manually treats their injuries. If the mercenary falls, their Second Best Buddy will appear to save them and try to get them to safety, but if they are shot down again the game ends and must be restarted from an earlier save. Health can only be restored either through picking up water bottles or using syrettes, of which the mercenary carries a limited number. From the outset of the game, the mercenary is suffering from malaria, which strikes at regular intervals and causes disorientation and blurring vision. The malarial fits must be treated with medicine, which can only be gained from the Underground by completing missions for them. Over the course of the game, the mercenary's actions increase their Reputation, which unlocks more missions but also causes the Underground to mistrust him, making the medicine harder to acquire.

The player may navigate the game world using a map and handheld GPS, which can be used to find item caches.

The mercenary can navigate the world on foot, travel between safe zones using bus routes, and use vehicles to travel including jeeps and quadbikes, boats for rivers, and a hang glider. Navigation is helped using a map and handheld GPS, in addition to other devices such as a locator for caches of the in-game currency blood diamonds. If a vehicle is damaged during combat, it must be repaired. Outside safe zones, the mercenary will be attacked when in range of any hostile group. A notable element of the open world is realistic physics and environmental effects, such as fire spreading through an area if lit and dust storms causing decreased visibility. Enemies are also designed to react and adapt based on the mercenary's tactics and their current reputation. Several species of animals can be encountered in the game, and are able to distract the enemy as well as make them aware of the player's presence. Equipment and weapons can only be purchased using blood diamonds, otherwise needing to be scavenged from the environment and defeated enemies. Scavenged guns will degrade over time, eventually jamming briefly and needing to be freed up to work again, or permanently and needing to be discarded.

Alongside the single player campaign, Far Cry 2 included a separate competitive online multiplayer mode, with teams of up to four players taking sides in the conflict and competing over objectives. Multiplayer gameplay was class based, with six classes available, and incorporated the same physics and environment elements as the main game. The available modes included two types of Deathmatch, a version of Capture the flag where players fight over control of a large blood diamond, and "Uprising", where team captains must capture nodes. Matches were ranked, with the winning team earning rewards based on their score. All versions include a map editor for creating multiplayer levels. It allows players to craft terrain, ranging from rocky areas to water pathways, and place shrubbery and buildings in available areas. Levels were shared online through the internet for Windows, and on consoles through PlayStation Network and Xbox Live. The online functions ended in June 2021 when Ubisoft closed down servers for its older titles.

== Synopsis ==
In the wake of a rebellion against the old government of an unnamed African nation, civil war rages between the rebel forces' two political factions, the United Front for Liberation and Labour (UFLL) and the Alliance for Popular Resistance (APR). While each claims to represent the people, they are equally brutal and exploitative with the civilian population. The situation is being worsened by the Jackal, an arms dealer distributing efficient low-price weapons to both sides in violation of a Joint Signatory Framework designed to stop the conflict escalating. The protagonist is one of a mercenary team sent into the country to kill the Jackal.

The mercenary arrives at a local town, only to succumb to malarial fever. The Jackal confronts him with his assumed failure, but does not kill him, leaving the mercenary to be incapacitated during an ambush on the town. The mercenary is rescued by members of one of the factions, and ends up going on missions for both sides in the hope of catching up with the Jackal. He also meets Reuben Oluwagembi, a journalist covering the conflict, and after aiding him gains access to malarial medicine through the Underground network, which works to save the civilian population from the activities of the UFLL and APR. During one mission to assassinate the leader of one side, the mercenary's employer betrays and nearly kills him, only for the Jackal to help him escape. Interactions with the Jackal, together with interview tapes that can be found in-game, reveal both his disillusionment with the conflict and wish to destroy the two factions to protect the civilian population.

The Jackal eventually confronts the mercenary, proposing they work together to save the civilians, and the mercenary is tasked with killing the UFLL and APR leaders. After killing the leaders, the mercenary meets with the Jackal, who reveals the factions are still hunting the civilians to either kill them or trap them in the country. He intends to bribe the border guards to let the civilians through while using explosives to prevent the soldiers' pursuit. The mercenary is given the choice of detonating the explosives at the cost of his life, or bribing the guards and then committing suicide, with the Jackal taking the other job. Post-credit dialogue reveals the country descends into anarchy despite attempted peace talks, Reuben's story is ignored by the press and he begins publishing it on his blog, the Underground is praised for its action saving civilians, and the Jackal's body is never found.

== Development ==
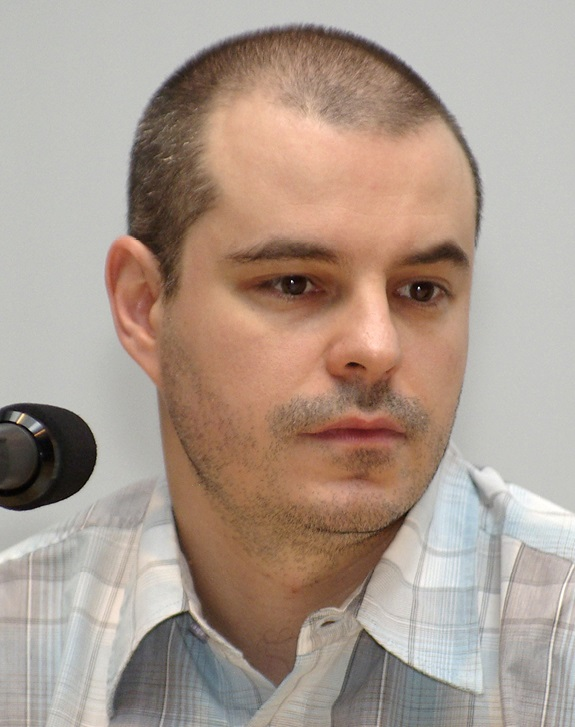
Clint Hocking, who acted as director, creating the basic scenario and world design.

The original Far Cry was developed by Crytek using their in-house CryEngine and published by Ubisoft. Far Cry was released in 2004, the same year Crytek signed a deal with Electronic Arts to produce a new CryEngine title, leaving them unable to work on future Far Cry projects. However, Ubisoft struck a deal with Crytek and eventually purchased the Far Cry intellectual property, allowing their Ubisoft Montreal studio to create further console Far Cry games using CryEngine technology. The aim with Far Cry 2 was to "rejuvenate" the Far Cry universe using a new setting and mechanics. The shift in direction was partly to separate it from Crytek's new project, which was assumed to be set in a similar tropical environment, but also to separate it from the original game's console spin-off titles, which all had similar environments. The change in setting and direction would also help invigorate the brand, which was suffering in the market due to exploitation of the original game's premise and tone. There was also the factor that several games and other media titles were using a jungle island setting. The team went through a long pre-production period, with plans for a sequel emerging prior to the original game's release and concept work beginning during the development of Far Cry Instincts (2005). Production lasted three and a half years.

The game was directed by Clint Hocking, and co-produced by Bertrand Hélias and Louis-Pierre Pharand. Hocking joined the project after finishing his work on Splinter Cell: Chaos Theory, choosing Far Cry 2 to take a break from the Splinter Cell series. The lead designer was Pierre Rivest, who described the experience as challenging due to having no other games as comparisons for the mechanics and scale of Far Cry 2. Gathering staff for the project was difficult, as production of Far Cry 2 ran parallel to or behind two other large-scale Ubisoft Montreal projects, Assassin's Creed and Splinter Cell: Conviction. According to narrative designer Patrick Redding, he and Hocking agreed to "go all out" on their vision regardless of its success. The final production team included over 150 staff members, the assembly of which was described by Pharand as a huge challenge.

Upon its original unveiling, Far Cry 2 was announced as a Windows-exclusive development. After returning from a media event in Leipzig, another team came to them and said they could get the engine working on PS3 and 360. Impressed by their tests, the game was scheduled for those consoles in turn. Another impetus to establish the engine on consoles was so other Ubisoft titles could make use of it in the future, and to push what was possible on consoles at the time. While there were technological limitations on the console versions due to preset hardware specifications, the Windows version was described as having no limitations. Technical director Dominic Guay stated that the only real difference between the Windows and console versions was its graphics, with the two otherwise being identical. They also took care not to make their game too demanding on Windows machines, contrasting against the notoriously high demands of Crytek's Crysis. The PS3 version caused worries for the team due to its notorious reputation as a difficult console for third-party developers, but a dedicated team of programmers worked to smooth over gameplay on the console.

The team started out with the basic CryEngine technology. In order to create their intended open world environment, they repurposed the old engine and created their own, dubbing it Dunia. The team "gutted" the old engine, rewriting and replacing an estimated 90 percent of the code. Engine development ran parallel to game development, resulting in "constantly shifting budgets" and regular adjustment of the gameplay, with the goal being to be able to create a square kilometer of game terrain in one day. They also designed a dedicated animation system called LivePosture, which controlled the movement of vegetation and the environment. Guay insisted at the outset of development that the game prompt the creation of new design tools rather than relying on existing tools. The team made use of Procedural Data Generation to handle the in-game environment and reactions, cutting down on both production time and the load on the engine. Guay planned a slow escalation of engine development, easing in new staff in small numbers to let them get experience with the engine rather than causing problems bringing in a large number of unprepared staff at once.

=== Scenario ===
Hocking and Redding came up with the initial narrative concept, which tied into the game's planned setting. While the original Far Cry had drawn from H. G. Wells's novel The Island of Doctor Moreau and had a divisive science fiction-like tone in consequence, Far Cry 2 took inspiration from Joseph Conrad's 1899 novella Heart of Darkness, as well as the more contemporary film adaptation Apocalypse Now (1979). The intent was for a darker, more realistic narrative and tone. Some surreal elements were retained to enhance the chosen art design. A theme of Heart of Darkness is how far people are willing to go, and how much they can become like monsters and leverage the unhinged side of their nature, in order to survive and endure through terrible circumstances. Another influence along the same lines was the novel Red Harvest by Dashiell Hammett, where the protagonist enters a lawless city and ultimately eliminates both sides of a deadly conflict. The game's conflict drew inspiration from events around the city of Nairobi, which were seen as emblematic of conflicts in Africa. The voice acting was done by actors from or close to the ethnicity of the in-game characters, such as the faction leaders being voiced by South African actors.

Contrasted with other games at the time, the narrative did not make use of traditional cutscenes or a strict guided path. Redding described the approach as "dynamic story architecture", aiming for a systemic narrative emerging from the player's actions. This approach required a dedicated narrative designer, with Hocking successfully persuading Ubisoft's management on the importance of the role. One of Redding's priorities was incorporating elements into the game world to reinforce the character's thematic journey into madness and violence, including the option for the player to fail at objectives without derailing the narrative or requiring a reset. The narrative progress is based on the player's reputation, described as an "invisible counter" which determined in-game events, though late in production it was felt a relationship history matrix between players and NPCs would have worked better. Due to the complexity of the game, this change could not be implemented. The narrative was cited as an example of the all-or-nothing approach to design, citing the Buddy dynamics only working properly with all twelve being alive as an issue tackled by the team.

The script was written by Susan O'Connor, who worked on other notable video games including BioShock, along with Armand Constantine and Ubisoft staff member Kevin Shortt. Redding described O'Connor as the principal writer for the project, saying she understood the difficulties of writing for video games compared to film and television. A common aspect of their interaction was each pushing back against the other on obtuse or behind-the-scenes motivations for characters that players would either never find or not understand. To aid in creating the Buddies, Ubisoft brought in Malcolm Clarke, a filmmaker known for his work on documentaries surrounding African mercenaries in the 1970s and 80s. A key part of the world and narrative design was giving the different faction leaders and lieutenants personality and narrative weight, allowing their deaths to have an impact on the world. Due to its central narrative of hunting down a target and fighting trained soldiers, the team made sure players would not be able to open fire on civilian targets, which would have undermined the narrative's themes. The strong focus on narrative stood in contrast to the original game, which was criticized for having a weak storyline. Redding described the Far Cry series as a "Trojan Horse brand" with low player expectations that allowed the team to be more experimental in their narrative approach.

Original Far Cry protagonist Jack Carver was not featured, as during test interviews players either did not remember or disliked him, so Hocking felt no need to bring him back. The player character was designed to be a blank slate through which players could become immersed, similar to Gordon Freeman from the Half-Life series. In line with this approach and out of a desire to promote immersion, the mercenary lead was made a silent protagonist. There was some discussion around incorporating more surreal elements, such as questioning the mercenary's grip on reality and memory of events, but these were never implemented. The Buddies were deliberately varied in age and ethnicity, reflecting real mercenaries. The Jackal was written as a contrast to the more simplistic antagonist of Far Cry, being an amoral pragmatist who would eventually understand the damage caused by his actions and take extreme measures to rectify it. He was later described as a MacGuffin character who provided a central goal and theme for the narrative without being very personable. A further thematic element was the mercenary's morality potentially falling towards or below that of the Jackal's. While never communicated in-game, Hocking later revealed the Jackal was intended to be a version of Carver, disturbed by the trauma he suffered and turned into a major smuggler who has seen many more terrible things.

=== Game design ===
The aim of the game design, as with the narrative, was to maintain a realistic tone and style through the experience, contrasted against the original game's shift into more outlandish elements later in the narrative. Hocking wanted to incorporate the African environment, found guns jamming during combat, and show a realistic version of the land that was not clean and sterile. The development team also wanted to show a life beyond standard combat, including scenes of normal living, farming, and livestock around settlements. The player mercenary's body is kept hidden except during key scenes such as healing animations, a request from Hocking to promote player immersion in the world. The minimal tutorial section was a deliberate choice, with lead designer Pierre Rivest saying the team wanted players to naturally learn the systems and combine them in their own way. Effort went into making the controls easy to use even within the planned innovative game design. Similar to the original, the team wanted an advanced and reactive artificial intelligence (AI) for enemies and other creatures within the environment. When designing the missions to work in an open world environment, main missions were made simple and easy to understand, with only optional sub routes unlocked through other characters having fail states outside a game over.

The outposts, which respawn their enemies after a set period, were originally intended to slowly rebuild and repopulate over time, but the team changed the design as it was possible for players to empty the entire game world and become bored, in addition to technical problems implementing the system properly. Malaria was introduced to present the player's with a persistent challenge, though they had no point of reference for the mechanic and in hindsight Rivest felt they had made it too intrusive. The system was originally more severe, with the player losing gameplay control of the mercenary, but this was toned down in the final release. The game's notable death mechanic was incorporated by Hocking, who had been frustrated over harsh death penalties in the Splinter Cell series and wanted a less-penalizing system that allowed for recovery from mistakes while still maintaining an element of risks. The Buddy system drew inspiration from the Girlfriends of Grand Theft Auto: San Andreas and soldier management in XCOM, in addition to smaller influences from other companion systems in games including BioShock and Ico. The enemy AI was designed early on as a basic system that would respond to actions in the environment or from the player, but this later meant no further AI system could be created to manage planned general behaviors outside combat.

The game's scale meant local cooperative multiplayer was not incorporated. The pressures of designing the single player and multiplayer modes alongside the engine design caused problems, forcing the team to split multiplayer development into its own team. This team had several young members, who suffered further problems under peer pressure from others within Ubisoft, requiring a design consultant to be brought in and complete the multiplayer designs, though there continued to be problems with a lack of clear design goals during the game's alpha testing period and the mode was not solidified until the beta period. The console map editor used the one designed for Far Cry Instincts as a template, with the team taking what they liked and rebuilding it in the new engine.

=== World and art design ===
During early planning, various settings were proposed and rejected, including Antarctica and the planet Mars. Art director Alexandre Amancio had several favorites during the concept design stage. He wanted the game to use a wilderness without signs of human habitation, meaning settings in mainland Asia and South America were dropped. Japan was discarded due to a lack of environmental variety and overuse in popular media, and the American West was rejected due to its restrictive historical background limiting narrative opportunities. A setting in the Canadian West was dropped both due to difficulties creating a compelling survival setting outside stereotypes of the region and its planned use in Remedy Entertainment's Alan Wake. The Australian outback was similar in environment to the final African setting, but its uninhabited nature made interactions and conflict difficult to justify. The variety of environments available for use helped make Africa the final choice, as well as the ability to incorporate the presence of malaria and use of blood diamonds as currency into the design.

It was decided not to set the game in a real country, so as not to limit the in-game environmental variety. When thinking about a region to emulate in-game, the team opted for Kenya due to its variety of environments both within and around its borders with Uganda, Ethiopia, and Tanzania. In July 2007, Ubisoft sent a team of the game's developers to Africa to carry out research for the game. Their research took them to Kenya and parts of Tanzania, chosen due to their variety of environments and political stability. They spent two weeks traveling around the region and camping out on the savanna. The team chose to camp rather than stay in a hotel, desiring an authentic experience. The field trip allowed them to observe the local architecture and environment first-hand, in addition to their guides telling them about the local vegetation and weather cycles. Amancio estimated that they obtained about 40 hours of footage and over eight gigabytes of photographic reference material. Another element highlighted by Amancio was the amount of animal droppings they saw, which they took care to incorporate into the game's visual identity. Pharand said that following the trip, they realized they had gotten the design of the game "so wrong" and made several changes to properly emulate the local environment.

The only African wildlife featured in the game world were herbivores; according to the developers, due to the in-game world design, predators without careful control would have eaten all the herbivores and starved to death. The team also wanted to make hunting an unenjoyable experience that would force the players to focus on the main game content. The size of the game world made testing for bugs difficult, with Hocking later saying they should have made it smaller. NPC conversations incorporated seen and recounted anecdotes from their field trip. A large portion of the in-game ambience was recorded live during the field trip. The character animations were considered a low priority due to the game's genre, so no animation director was appointed. In hindsight, Hocking saw this as a poor choice due to its ambitious graphical presentation and lack of traditional UI.

=== Music ===
The music of Far Cry 2 was composed by Marc Canham, who was best known at the time for his work on the Driver series. He worked alongside the Nimrod Production Orchestra, a group he founded as part of his production company. When Canham was contacted about the project, he was asked to create a score that did something "new and exciting". In keeping with this wish, he ignored the musical style of the original Far Cry. Compared to other projects he had worked on, there were no equivalent games and soundtracks to reference for Far Cry 2, so the music team were left to make their own judgements about the sound balance. Their early prototypes were rejected by Ubisoft for being bombastic and overly loud, so Canham shifted the score to focus on ambience. Creating the music required balancing the game's two conflicting elements as an action-based shooter with an emotional sombre narrative. He created a less bombastic score than other shooters of the time, using a string sextet supported by African percussion instruments; the latter included djembes, udus and kalimbas. Based on their research, the team focused on the Ashiko along with Kundabigoya and Coucou rhythms as the core of the game's soundtrack.

The music was recorded using a small ensemble of live players, again going against conventions of the time which relied on large orchestras or electronic and synthetic soundtracks. The cuing and mixing of elements was done live during recording using an MPC 2000. The string sections were recorded at Abbey Road Studios. A notable contributor to the soundtrack is Senegalese singer Baaba Maal, who recorded both full vocals and tribal chant-like elements to incorporate into the soundtrack. He visited Abbey Road, received a four-hour "crash course" on the game's music, and impressed Canham with his performance as their previous contact had been remote and sporadic due to Maal's touring commitments. The main theme incorporated both Maal and the sextet. Only three percussion tracks were recorded at any one time, giving them time and leeway to separate and mix the different tracks. Final mastering was done at Abby Roads.

A digital soundtrack album was published by Ubisoft through iTunes on October 21, 2008. As part of the game's promotion, another album titled African Swim was released on October 20 as a free download by Adult Swim. A co-production by Ubisoft and Adult Swim, the album focused exclusively on music by South African musicians including Gumshev and Maggz. The album also included behind-the-scenes footage of the game's production.

== Release ==
The existence of Far Cry 2 was first hinted in September 2006 through a leak of screenshots, artwork and video footage of several in-production titles. It was officially announced for PC in July 2007, though it was hinted through online store listings before that. The console versions were announced in January 2008. The game's complexity made creating a commercial game demo impractical, so the team instead focused that effort into further polishing the final product. For piracy protection, the Windows version made use of SecuROM digital rights management, with limited version installs across up to three devices with repeated installs possible provided earlier versions were removed. The game was compatible with the amBX peripheral designed by Philips, allowing greater immersion into the game's world through light and vibrations. Production was completed on October 14, 2008, when Ubisoft Montreal declared the game had gone gold.

Far Cry 2 was released in North America on October 21, 2008. It subsequently released on October 23 in Australia, and October 24 in Europe. Alongside the standard edition, limited editions were released in North America and Europe. The GameStop-exclusive Pre-Order Edition came with a real-world map of the game's world and six additional in-game missions. The GAME-exclusive European version contained an artbook, a behind-the-scenes DVD, a guidebook, and the map. Far Cry 2 was reissued on February 21, 2014, as part of a bundle for Windows and consoles as part of Far Cry: The Wild Expedition, a compilation of all Far Cry titles up to that point. It was also made backwards compatible with the Xbox One on January 17, 2018.

The console versions were published in Japan by Ubisoft's local branch. The 360 version was released on November 21, and the PS3 version on December 25. The Windows version, which included a translated manual, was published by E Frontier on December 12. A version for mobile phones was developed and published by Gameloft, releasing in 2008 after the PC and console versions. This version was reworked as a top-down third-person shooter, with the mercenary undergoing a series of ten missions.

As part of its promotion for PS3, environments themed after Far Cry 2 were released through PlayStation Home. Ubisoft eventually updated the game so multiplayer matches could be launched through Home. In November, a downloadable content bundle dubbed "Fortune's Pack" was released. It included three new weapons, an Exploding Crossbow, Ceremonial Shotgun, and Silenced Shotgun; vehicles, including a utility truck and ATV; and five new multiplayer maps. Ubisoft released three software patches between November 2008 and June 2009, fixing bugs and balancing in the single player and multiplayer campaigns, a higher gameplay difficulty option, in addition to adjustments to the map editor and how the game used hardware. The later patch also allowed the PC version to launch without needing the game disc.

A prequel novel, FarCry 2: Blutige Diamanten (Far Cry 2: Blood Diamonds), was written by Michael Bhatty and published as a German exclusive on May 21, 2008, by Panini Comics. The storyline focuses on veterinarian Paula as she struggles to survive in the middle of the civil war when she comes into possession of important information. Bhatty wrote the book in parallel with a novelization of the original game, using the first book to introduce characters who were featured in Blutige Diamanten. These characters were Marty Alencar, one of the playable mercenaries, and ex-CIA Zam agent who was a novel-exclusive character. Other mercenary characters from the main game were also included. He was given access to the game's assets to write the novel, though since it was early in production there were some differences such as Reuben's name. The different names were rationalized as Reuben using a pseudonym to protect himself. The characters were all given names native to Central and South Africa, with meanings related to their narrative role. Protagonist Paula was inspired by a namesake in the television series Daktari and the video game protagonist Lara Croft.

== Reception ==
Reception

Aggregate score
Aggregator	Score
Metacritic	85/100

Review scores
Publication	Score
1Up.com	B+
Edge	8/10
Eurogamer	8/10
Game Informer	8/10
GamePro	5/5
GameSpot	8.5/10
GameSpy	3.5/5
GameTrailers	8.7/10
IGN	(PC) 8.9/10 (PS3/X360) 8.8/10 (Mobile) 7/10
PlayStation Official Magazine – UK	9/10
Official Xbox Magazine (US)	8.5/10
PC Gamer (UK)	9.4/10
PC Zone	90/100
Pocket Gamer	4.5/5

The Windows version was the best-selling game in North America during its opening week. The 360 version was fourth, while the PS3 version was fifth. According to a report by the NPD Group, Far Cry 2 was the fifteenth best-selling Windows game during November 2008. By November 12, the game had sold one million copies worldwide across all platforms. Sales were up to 2.9 million by the following January. Far Cry 2 met with generally positive reviews from gaming journalists. On review aggregator website Metacritic, the Windows and console version were given scores of 85 points out of 100; the score was based on 34 reviews for Windows, 49 for PS3, and 75 for 360.

Thierry Nguyen of 1Up.com said it qualified as one of the best shooters of 2008 despite many small problems with its gameplay balance, and Edge Magazine enjoyed the main gameplay and praised the twist ending's match with the overall theme. Christian Donlan of Eurogamer called it "a game that was born to struggle with itself", noting several elements that clashed with its aesthetic and enjoyable gameplay structure. Game Informer's Matt Miller found the game's basic combat fairly weak, but otherwise praised its design and player freedom, citing the emotional connection developed with the Buddies as a highlight. Shaun McInnis of GameSpot was positive about the amount of content and freedom offered to players when approaching different missions.

GamePro gave the title a perfect score in its review, calling it one of the best shooters on the market while noting its scale might be off-putting to genre veterans. Dave Kosak of GameSpy gave most of his praise to the open combat design, faulting the open world traversal and lack of clear character motivations. GameTrailers positively noted its ambitious design and realistic feel compared to its predecessor, noting it felt good to play on both consoles and PC. Reviewing all three versions, IGN's Charles Onyett lauded the gameplay and graphics, giving the PC version a higher score due to its better graphical performance. PlayStation Official Magazine – UK's Leon Hurley gave high praise to its design and aesthetic despite some minor criticisms of its technical performance and lack of in-game guidance. Cameron Lewis of Official Xbox Magazine praised the variety of approaches the gameplay allowed. John Blyth for PC Zone was almost universally positive about the game's mechanics and aesthetic, but faulted the voice acting and general hostility of NPCs towards the player. Tim Edwards, writing for PC Gamer, praised its world design and open-ended gameplay despite being underwhelmed by the narrative delivery.

Reaction to the story and tone was generally positive, though several reviewers cited problems with its delivery and handling of its themes. The pace and tone of dialogue was also questioned by Miller, Onyett and Blyth. The basic combat and open gameplay approach met with a generally positive response. When mentioned, the vehicle travel and combat saw mixed reactions. The Buddies received positive comments for both their mechanical and narrative contributions. The malaria mechanic saw a mixed response from some critics, though Blyth and GameTrailers praised it as an innovative mechanic. Many reviewers criticized the AI for erratic behavior. The multiplayer was generally praised as an enjoyable if standard element. The game's aesthetics were enjoyed where mentioned despite some technical issues, though Donlan was disappointed that some of the game-centered aesthetic design undermined the otherwise realistic atmosphere. The PC version met with general praise, though all reviews noted the high hardware requirements to run the game properly. The mobile adaptation met with favorable reviews, with Pocket Gamer praising it as a strong game in its own right and IGN enjoying it despite finding it inferior to the console and PC versions.

=== Awards and retrospective ===
The Academy of Interactive Arts & Sciences nominated Far Cry 2 for "Action Game of the Year" during the 12th Annual Interactive Achievement Awards. It was nominated in the "Best Shooter" at the 2008 Spike Video Game Awards. Also in 2008, the game was nominated in the "Graphics/Technical" category at the National Academy of Video Game Trade Reviewers ceremony. At the 2009 Game Developers Choice Awards, it was nominated for the "Game Design" and "Writing" categories. In the book Gaming and the Arts of Storytelling, Darshana Jayemanne noted the game's many thematic and narrative parallels to Heart of Darkness, citing it as a good example of interactive storytelling. Chris Remo, in an opinion piece for Gamasutra, noted that Far Cry 2 rewarded thoughtful and slower-paced gameplay, praising it for providing an environment where players could create their own experiences.

In an article ranking all entries in the Far Cry series in 2021, Game Informer ranked Far Cry 2 as eighth, with the writer calling it "black sheep of the family, beloved by just as many as those who hate it." Polygon's Austen Goslin called it a game ahead of its time due to its mechanics and themes. Doc Burford of USGamer noted its ambition and cited it as an example of diegetic storytelling through its gameplay mechanics. Phil Hornshaw, writing for Digital Trends, noted its dated nature in some areas and problems with its mechanics, but found it superior to several later entries due to its immersion and tone. Marsh Davies of Rock Paper Shotgun lauded it as the best entry in the series despite its flaws, calling the journey "painful, arduous but unforgettable". Both Goslin and Davies compared the difficulty to the later Dark Souls series.

== Legacy ==
Ubisoft Montreal continued as lead developer for the series, beginning production on a sequel titled Far Cry 3, which was released in 2012. This sequel would return to the first game's tropical setting, either discarding or polishing gameplay elements that saw a mixed reaction from Far Cry 2 while improving the core gameplay. The Jackal, despite his mixed reputation among series fans going forward, was the beginning of a trend for leading charismatic antagonists taking a prominent role in the story and marketing. Far Cry 2 was the first major release to use Ubisoft's eventually-common design philosophy of sustainable franchises with large open worlds on next-generation gaming hardware. This formula would be embraced by later Far Cry games, the Assassin's Creed franchise, and properties based on the work of Tom Clancy.
