= Jade Raymond =

Canadian video game creator (born 1975)

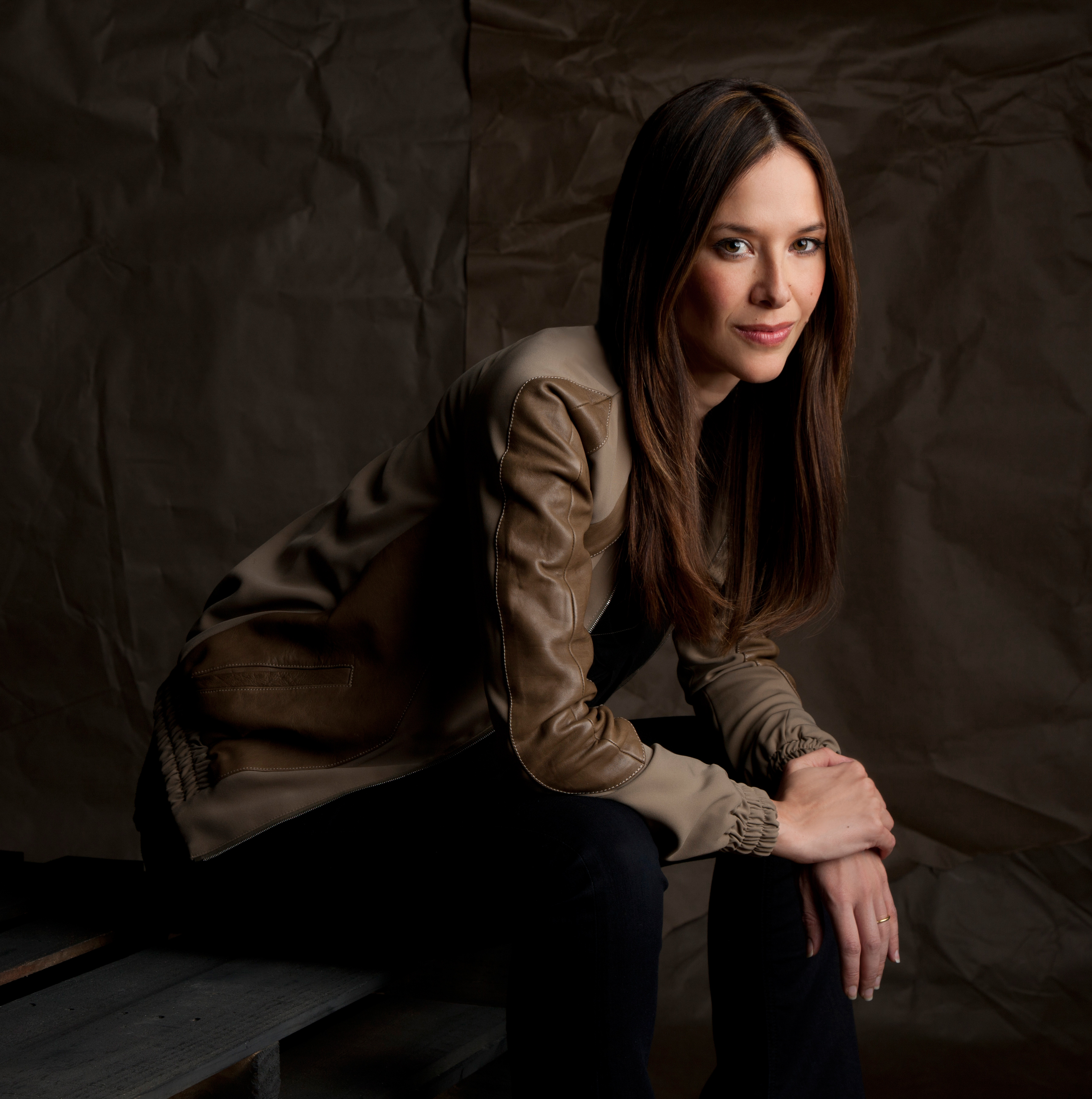
- Born: 28 August 1975 (age 51); Montreal, Quebec, Canada
- Education: McGill University (B.S.)
- Occupations: Programmer, video game producer
- Employer(s): Ubisoft (2004–2014); Motive Studio (2015–2018); Google (2019–2021); Haven Studios (2021–2025)

Jade Raymond (born 28 August 1975) is a Canadian video game producer, best known for leading the creation of the Assassin's Creed and Watch Dogs franchises, as well as building Ubisoft Toronto and Motive Studio. In March 2021, Raymond announced the founding of a new independent development team called Haven Studios, which was later acquired by Sony Interactive Entertainment in July 2022, making them a first-party developer for PlayStation Studios. In May 2025, it was announced that she had left Haven Studios.

== Early life and career ==
Jade Raymond was born 28 August 1975 in Montreal. She graduated from St. George's School of Montreal in 1992 and Marianopolis College in 1994. She received a Bachelor of Science degree from McGill University in 1998, where she majored in computer science.

Raymond's first post-university job was as a programmer for Sony, where she eventually helped in the creation of Sony Online's first Research and Development group. This led to Electronic Arts where she worked as a producer on The Sims Online. From 2003 to 2004, Raymond joined the G4 program The Electric Playground as a part-time correspondent, working with Victor Lucas, Tommy Tallarico and Julie Stoffer. In 2004, she started working for Ubisoft Montreal, where she led the creation of the first Assassin's Creed game. Raymond went on to become executive producer on Assassin's Creed II, and was executive producer of new IPs at Ubisoft Montreal, which included Watch Dogs and The Mighty Quest for Epic Loot.

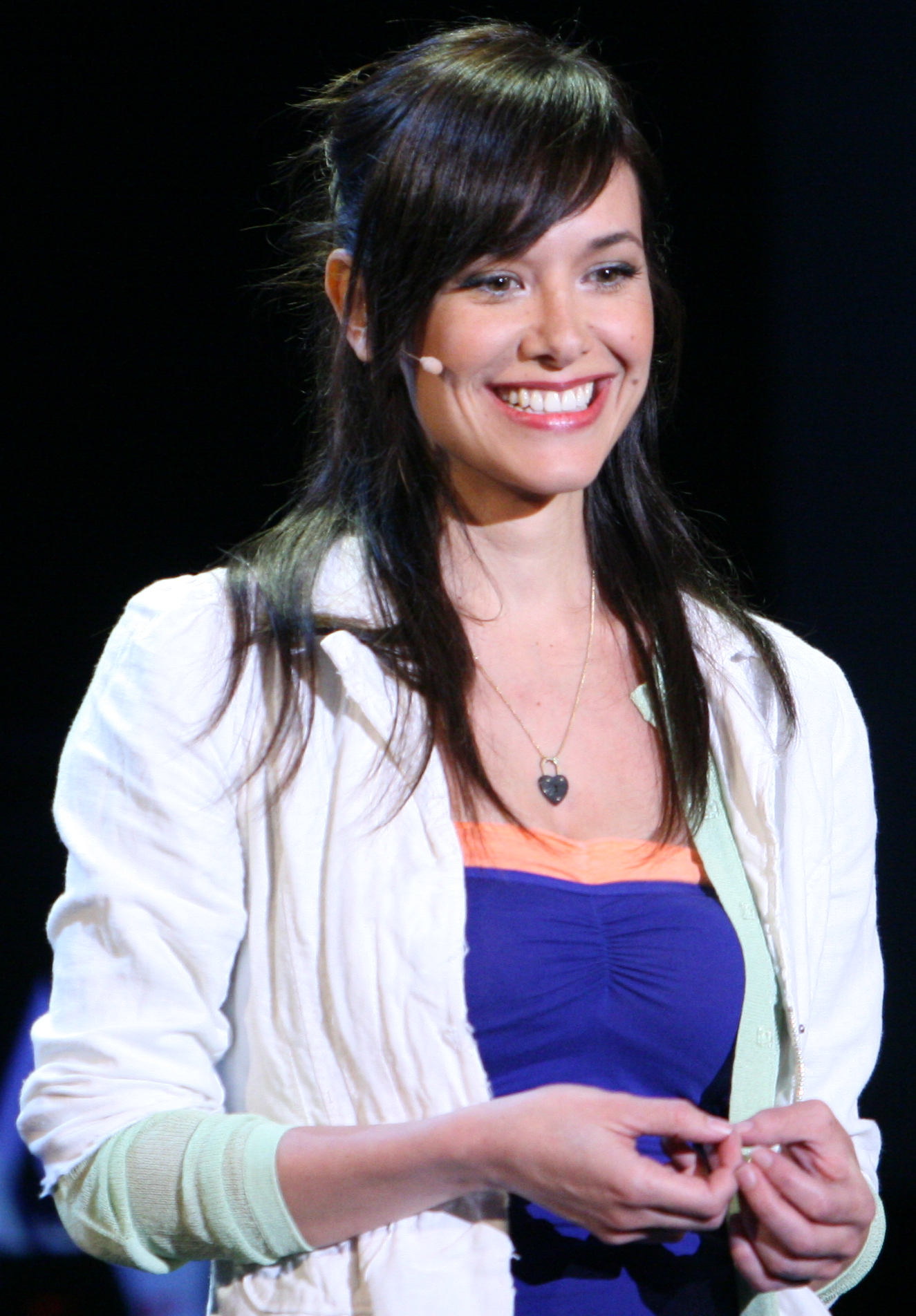
Raymond at E3 2007

In January 2010, Raymond moved to Toronto to build Ubisoft Toronto, in the role of managing director. In October 2014, she left Ubisoft.

In July 2015, Raymond announced that she had joined Electronic Arts and formed Motive Studio, based in Montreal. She was also to be in charge of Visceral Games, located in California, where she worked with games designer and writer Amy Hennig on Star Wars games, and also developed new original IP. Raymond is also on the Board of Directors of WIFTI, an organization dedicated the advancement of women across film, television and screen-based industries.

In January 2018, Raymond was named to the board of directors for the Academy of Interactive Arts & Sciences. In July 2018, she was recognized for "her trailblazing endeavors across her 20-year career" with the Develop Vanguard Award. In October 2018, she received the Pioneer Award from the Fun & Serious Game Festival, recognizing her "contributions to the industry as a producer of games that are considered a turning point in the industry". Raymond was one of few video game executives named in the Variety 2018 and 2019 list of 500 most influential business leaders shaping the global entertainment industry.

In October 2018, Raymond left Motive Studio, alluding to a "top secret project". In March 2019, Raymond announced that she had joined Google as a vice president; during the 2019 Game Developers Conference, Google affirmed that she would be heading Google's Studios, Stadia Games and Entertainment, to create exclusive content for Google's Stadia streaming service. In February 2021, Raymond announced her departure from Stadia Games and Entertainment, as well as Google, concurrent with Google's announcement of the wind down for their in-house Stadia Games and Entertainment development studio.

In March 2021, Raymond founded Haven Studios, a new independent development studio, with Sony Interactive Entertainment investing in the studio to create a new original IP for PlayStation. In July 2022, Sony Interactive Entertainment acquired Haven Studios, making them a first-party developer for PlayStation Studios. Their first game was to be Fairgames, a multiplayer live service game built around heists. In May 2025, it was announced that Raymond had left the company. In November 2026, the game was later cancelled after unsuccessful playtesting, and Haven Studios was refocused to be a support studio for PlayStation Studios.

== Games ==
Year	Title	Company	Role	Ref.
2002	The Sims Online	Electronic Arts	Producer	
2007	Assassin's Creed	Ubisoft	Producer	
2009	Assassin's Creed II	Ubisoft	Executive producer	
2009	Assassin's Creed: Bloodlines	Ubisoft	Executive producer	
2013	Tom Clancy's Splinter Cell: Blacklist	Ubisoft	Executive producer	
2014	Watch Dogs	Ubisoft	Executive producer	
2014	Assassin's Creed Unity	Ubisoft	Managing director	
2014	Far Cry 4	Ubisoft	Managing director	
2015	The Mighty Quest for Epic Loot	Ubisoft	Executive producer	
2017	Star Wars: Battlefront II	Electronic Arts	SVP Group General Manager	
Cancelled	Fairgames	Haven Studios		
