= Philip Shahbaz =

American-Iranian actor (born 1974)

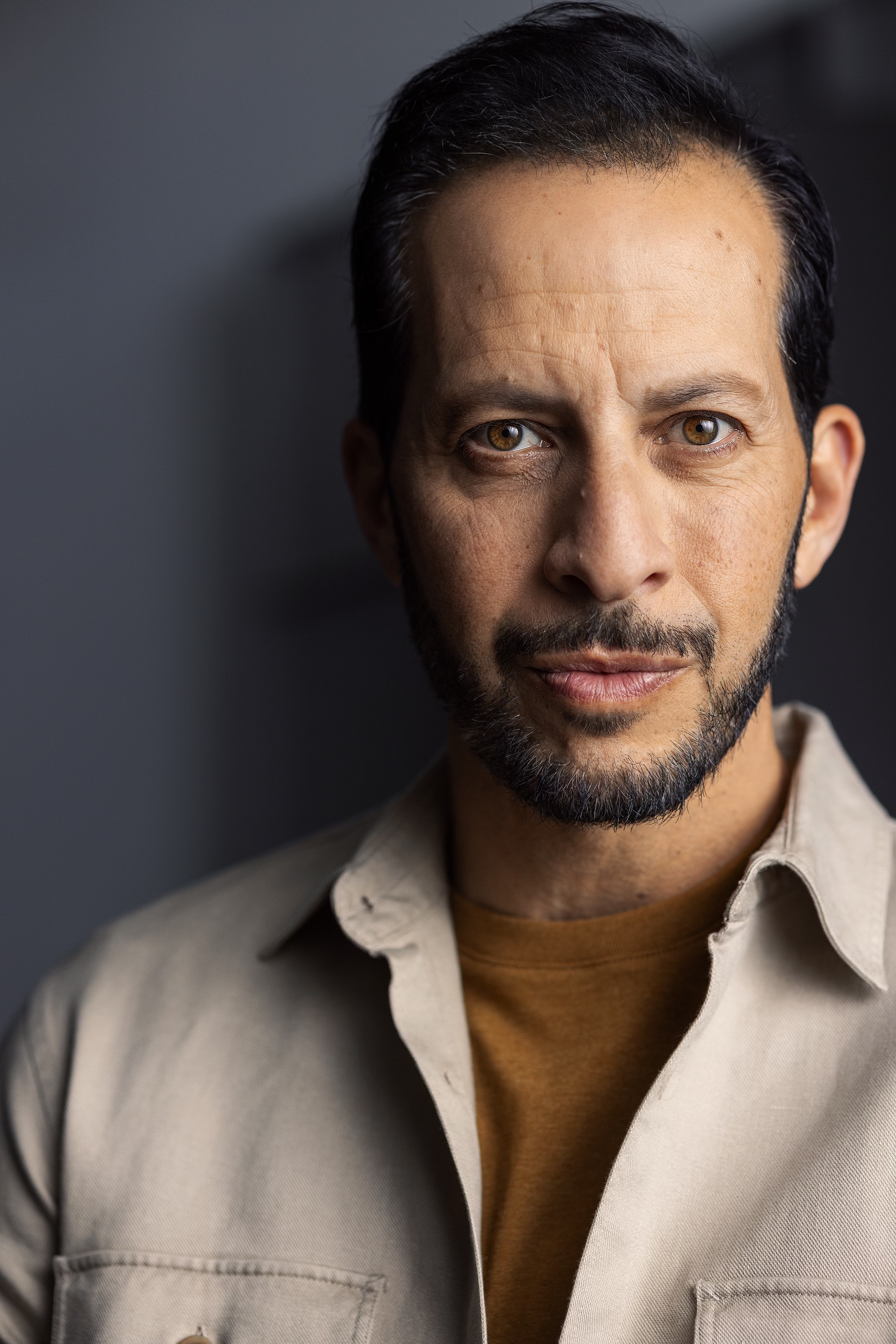
- Philip Shahbaz
- Born: July 1, 1974 (age 52); Chicago, Illinois
- Education: Whitworth University
- Occupation: Actor
- Years active: 2005–present

Philip Shahbaz (born July 1, 1974) is an American actor who is known as the voice of Altaïr Ibn-LaʼAhad in the Ubisoft video game Assassin's Creed, for his portrayal of Hollywood legend Peter Bogdanovich in Hulu's Welcome to Chippendales, and for his recurring role as Rabbi Akiva in The Chosen, a television drama about the life of Jesus Christ and those who knew him.

== Early life ==
Shahbaz was born in Chicago, Illinois. His family moved from Chicago to Turlock, California.

== Filmography ==
=== Television ===
Year	Title	Role
2005	Over There	Iraqi Soldier #2
2006	E-Ring	Palace Guard
2006	The Unit	Dasani
2006	Sleeper Cell	Custom Agent
2007	Californication	Man on Cell Phone
2007	Journeyman	Superior
2007	Chuck	Art Dealer
2008	Caught in the Action	Undercover
2008	Mind of Mencia	Terrorist
2008	Eleventh Hour	ER Doctor
2009	The Bill Engvall Show	Maitre'd
2010	24	Wasim's Officer
2010	Grey's Anatomy	Translator
2010	Undercovers	Communications Officer
2012	Touch	Abdul's Uncle #1
2013	Lauren	Husband
2020	Paranormal	Wahbi (voice)
2021	NCIS	Doctor Hamza Bashar
2021	SEAL Team	Yassine 'Raqqa Jacques' Kassen
2021	So Not Worth It	Aksour
2022	Bosch: Legacy	Cyrus
2022	Welcome to Chippendales	Peter Bogdanovich

=== Video games ===
Year	Title	Role
2007	Assassin's Creed	Altaïr Ibn-LaʼAhad

=== Film ===
Year	Title	Role
2005	Matthew 26:17	Matthew
2006	Jaded	Professor
2007	Unending Hell	Muhammed
2009	The Terrorist	Sameh Bahar (voice)
2010	Jeffie Was Here	Mahmood
2020	DNA	Nadir (voice)
2021	Squared Love	Andrzej (voice)
