= Shaun White Skateboarding =

2010 video game

- Developer: Ubisoft Montreal
- Publisher: Ubisoft
- Platforms: Microsoft Windows; PlayStation 3 Wii; Xbox 360
- Release: Microsoft Windows: AU: September 30, 2010; EU: October 1, 2010; NA: October 26, 2010; PlayStation 3, Wii, Xbox 360: NA: October 24, 2010; AU: October 28, 2010; EU: October 29, 2010
- Genre: Sports
- Modes: Single-player, multiplayer

Shaun White Skateboarding is a 2010 sports video game developed by Ubisoft Montreal and published by Ubisoft for Microsoft Windows, PlayStation 3, Wii and Xbox 360. It is a spin-off of the Shaun White Snowboarding duology. It was also the first PlayStation 3 and Xbox 360 game Ubisoft released without a paper manual, opting to use an in-game digital manual instead.

== Reception ==
Reception

Aggregate score
Aggregator	Score		
Aggregator	PS3	Wii	Xbox 360
Metacritic	61/100	59/100	61/100

Review scores
Publication	Score		
Publication	PS3	Wii	Xbox 360
Edge	7/10	N/A	7/10
Eurogamer	N/A	N/A	7/10
Famitsu	31/40	N/A	31/40
Game Informer	7.75/10	N/A	7.75/10
GamePro	N/A	N/A	2/5
GameSpot	N/A	N/A	6/10
GameTrailers	N/A	N/A	7/10
GameZone	N/A	N/A	5/10
IGN	N/A	N/A	5.5/10
Joystiq	N/A	N/A	3/5
Official Nintendo Magazine	N/A	79%	N/A
Official Xbox Magazine (US)	N/A	N/A	5/10
PlayStation: The Official Magazine	5/10	N/A	N/A
The Daily Telegraph	N/A	N/A	6/10
The Guardian	N/A	N/A	1/5

The game received "mixed or average reviews" on all platforms according to video game review aggregator Metacritic.

In Japan, Famitsu gave the PlayStation 3 and Xbox 360 versions a score of one eight, one seven, and two eights, for a total of 31 out of 40. One reviewer wrote: "The game's largely meant for casual users, and it's easy to break out a lot of different tricks. The story setup, which has you saving a city from evil with the power of your skateboard, is pretty funny. You have a lot of board and hat selections and so on when making a character, but I would have liked a few more facial types to choose from." Another wrote, "The 'shaping' system was obviously pretty ambitious on the developer's part, but actually play it, and it doesn't really make much of a difference in gameplay. I wish there was more flash, or speed, or something to differentiate this from other games."
