= Shaun White Snowboarding: World Stage =

2009 video game

- Developer: Ubisoft Montreal
- Publisher: Ubisoft
- Platform: Wii
- Release: NA: November 8, 2009; AU: November 12, 2009; EU: November 13, 2009
- Genre: sports (snowboarding)
- Modes: Single-player, multiplayer

Shaun White Snowboarding: World Stage is a snowboarding video game developed by Ubisoft Montreal and published by Ubisoft exclusively for the Wii. It is the sequel to the 2008 multiplatform video game Shaun White Snowboarding.

== Reception ==
Reception

Aggregate score
Aggregator	Score
Metacritic	72/100

Review scores
Publication	Score
1Up.com	C
Eurogamer	6/10
Game Informer	6/10
GameSpot	7.5/10
GameTrailers	7.9/10
GameZone	8/10
IGN	7.6/10
Nintendo Power	7/10
Official Nintendo Magazine	80%
VideoGamer.com	7/10

The game received "average" reviews according to video game review aggregator Metacritic.

It also received a 7.6 rating from IGN.
