= Far Cry Vengeance =

2006 first-person shooter game

- Developer: Ubisoft Montreal
- Publisher: Ubisoft
- Series: Far Cry
- Engine: CryEngine
- Platform: Wii
- Release: NA: December 12, 2006; EU: January 5, 2007; AU: February 28, 2007
- Genre: First-person shooter
- Modes: Single-player, multiplayer

Far Cry Vengeance is a 2006 first-person shooter game developed by Ubisoft Montreal and published by Ubisoft for the Wii. It is a remake of Far Cry Instincts: Evolution, originally released for the Xbox, and features changed controls, new weapons and vehicles, and three additional levels. The game received largely negative reviews for its graphics, overly compressed FMVs, and poor enemy AI, though the controls were praised.

== Gameplay ==
The game takes full advantage of the Wii Remote and its Nunchuk attachment. For example, the player can make the character jump by lifting the Nunchuk. Weapons are aimed by pointing the Wii Remote at the screen, and melee attacks are carried out by making a slashing motion with it. The zoom on sniper rifles is controlled by moving the Wii Remote towards the television. Split screen Chaos mode (standard deathmatch) is included. The popular map maker mode, as well as online play, are absent from the Wii version of the game, and no WiiConnect24 features are utilized.

Vengeance features some exclusive content not present in the original version of Far Cry Instincts: Evolution, including three new levels, three multiplayer maps, and new weapons, such as the Bull .44 large-caliber revolver, the AK-47, and a shotgun.

== Plot ==
The game begins with Jack Carver, the protagonist, being approached in a bar by a woman named Kade, who asks him to meet her later. He agrees, but is arrested before he can meet her. While in prison, he learns that Kade is working with a group of rebels. He soon escapes when a man with supernatural powers named Semeru attacks the police station. Jack eventually meets Kade on the beach, and she takes him to an island where the rebels asked Kade to perform a gun run. In the middle of this mission, the rebels turn on Jack and Kade. The pair manage escape, and much of the game from this point onwards revolves around attacking the rebels.

Later, Kade is captured by Semeru, who plans to take her back to the rebel base. Jack tries to stop him, but is attacked by a large number of rebels. He flees through the forest, and meets a man named Kien Do, who asks for Jack's help against the rebels. After several battles with the rebels, Kien Do is captured by rebel forces. Jack pursues them to the main rebel base, where he finds Kien Do's corpse at the foot of the mountain the base sits on. Jack climbs the mountain, battling rebel soldiers along the way. When he reaches the base, he finds Semeru and Kade, who Carver finds out is working with Semeru. Jack manages to defeat Semeru, and then Kade.

Two different endings can occur during the final boss fight. If Jack kills Kade, he breaks out of the island using his feral abilities. Otherwise he leaves her at the island and takes control of Semeru's soldiers.

== Development ==
The game was scheduled to have been unveiled on September 14, 2006 during a Nintendo press conference, but was absent from the event. First details were instead revealed by the VGM Daily Podcast Episode 118 on September 5, 2006 it uses a ported version of the CryEngine used in the original Far Cry game.

== Reception ==
Reception

Aggregate score
Aggregator	Score
Metacritic	38/100

Review scores
Publication	Score
Edge	3/10
Eurogamer	4/10
Game Informer	4.5/10
GamePro	1.5/5
GameSpot	5.5/10
GameSpy	1.5/5
GameTrailers	4.8/10
IGN	4/10
Nintendo Power	4/10
VideoGamer.com	5/10
X-Play	2/5
The A.V. Club	C−

Far Cry Vengeance received "generally unfavorable" reviews, according to review aggregator website Metacritic.

IGN gave the game a 4/10, though it did give its gameplay ranking a 7 and commented that, gameplay-wise, it was "A fundamentally fun shooter and most of the new Wii controls feel great, despite not even looking half as good as the year-old Xbox version." Paul Devlin of Videogamer.com gave the game a 5/10, stating: "With the series arguably hinging on its looks, a Far Cry game should be showcasing the very best the Wii can offer rather than just being a mess of blurry textures that would not be out of place in a PS2 game."
