= Shaun White Snowboarding =

2008 video game

- Developer: Ubisoft Montreal
- Publisher: Ubisoft
- Engine: Scimitar
- Platforms: Nintendo DS, PlayStation Portable, Wii, PlayStation 3, Xbox 360, PlayStation 2, Microsoft Windows, Mac OS X
- Release: November 13, 2008: Nintendo DS, PlayStation Portable, Wii; AU: November 13, 2008; EU: November 14, 2008; NA: November 16, 2008 PlayStation 3, Xbox 360; EU: November 14, 2008; NA: November 16, 2008; AU: November 20, 2008 PlayStation 2; NA: November 16, 2008; AU: December 4, 2008; EU: December 5, 2008 Microsoft Windows; NA: December 2, 2008; AU: December 4, 2008; EU: December 5, 2008 Mac OS X; NA: March 24, 2009
- Genre: sports (snowboarding)
- Modes: Single-player, multiplayer

Shaun White Snowboarding is a snowboarding video game developed by Ubisoft Montreal and published by Ubisoft for Nintendo DS, PlayStation Portable, Wii, PlayStation 3, Xbox 360, PlayStation 2, Microsoft Windows and Mac OS X.

The Wii version of the game is titled Shaun White Snowboarding: Road Trip.

== Gameplay ==
There are six mountains in Shaun White Snowboarding, including Alaska, Park City, Europe, and Japan. Each mountain features up to three different sections: peak, back country, and park (or resort). There is also a "Target Limited Edition" of the game that is exclusive to Target; this version gives the player access to Target Mountain, a mountain with Target branding all over it. It has been described in-game as extremely difficult to find, and contains additional jibs, character models, and a sponsored version of the standard game's best snowboard which can be unlocked before the player's final challenge against Shaun White. The last mountain, called B.C., is only available in the "Mile-High Pack" paid downloadable content. It is set in British Columbia.

As players progress through the game, they will earn abilities that will help them. Some of the abilities consist of gaining high speeds or the ability to break through obstacles to progress further.

== Reception ==
Reception

Aggregate score
| Aggregator | Score |
|---|---|
| Metacritic | Wii: 78% (28 reviews); PSP: 70% (5 reviews); DS: 63% (4 reviews); PS3: 63% (30 reviews); PC: 60% (8 reviews); Xbox 360: 60% (48 reviews) |

Review scores
| Publication | Score |
|---|---|
| Game Informer | 6.75/10 |
| GameSpot | Wii: 7.5/10; DS: 6.5/10 (4 reviews); PS3: 5/10; Xbox 360: 5/10 |
| Official Xbox Magazine (US) | 6.5/10 |

The Wii version of the game received more positive reception than any of the other versions. Eurogamer gave the Wii version 7/10, praising it as "the best looking version", singling out the presentation, soundtrack, implementation of the Wii Balance Board controls and multiplayer, while criticizing the Wii Remote controls, half-pipe sections, difficulty level, and short duration of the single-player mode.

Daemon Hatfield of IGN said that "A kid-friendly, motion-controlled version of Shaun White Snowboarding could have been a disaster, but this turns out to be a truly slick edition of the franchise."

The Wii version of Shaun White Snowboarding was the 20th best-selling game of December 2008 in the United States, and it was the best selling version. Over 3 million copies of the game had been sold as of May 2009.

The Wii version was a nominee for several Wii-specific awards from IGN in its 2008 video game awards, including Best New IP, Best Sports Game, Best Graphics Technology, Best Use of the Balance Board, and Game of the Year. The Xbox 360 version was nominated for "Worst Game Everyone Played" by GameSpot in their 2008 video game awards, and was awarded the title of "Most Dubious Use of In-Game Advertising" for excluding 20% of its content from editions not sold from the Target Stores editions.

== Sequel and spin-off ==
In the many months that followed Snowboarding's release, Ubisoft Montreal developed a sequel, Shaun White Snowboarding: World Stage and a spin-off, Shaun White Skateboarding. The former was released exclusively for the Wii and supported the Wii Balance Board and Wii Motion Plus.

An iOS game titled Shaun White Snowboarding: Origins was released in December 2009.
