= Far Cry (video game) =

2004 video game

- Developer: Crytek
- Publisher: Ubisoft
- Director: Cevat Yerli
- Producers: Chris Natsuume; Jack Mamais; Richard Tsao
- Programmers: Cevat Yerli; Marco Corbetta
- Artists: Michael Khaimzon; Raymond Leung; Max Aristov
- Writer: Alexis Nolent
- Composer: Thomas Baertschi
- Series: Far Cry
- Engine: CryEngine 1 (PC); Dunia Engine 2 (Classic)
- Platforms: Windows; PlayStation 3; Xbox 360
- Release: Windows: NA: March 23, 2004; EU: March 26, 2004; PlayStation 3, Xbox 360: NA: February 11, 2014; EU: February 12, 2014
- Genre: First-person shooter
- Modes: Single-player, multiplayer

Far Cry is a 2004 first-person shooter video game developed by Crytek and published by Ubisoft. It is the first installment in the Far Cry franchise. Set on a mysterious tropical archipelago, the game follows Jack Carver, a former American special forces operative, as he searches for journalist Valerie Constantine, who accompanied him to the islands but went missing after their boat was destroyed by mercenaries. As Jack explores the islands, he begins to discover the horrific genetic experiments being conducted on the local wildlife and must confront the mad scientist behind them.

The game was the first to use Crytek's CryEngine, and was designed as an open-ended first-person shooter, though it lacks most of the freedom its successors would offer to the player. While players can freely explore the game's world like in later Far Cry titles, they are most often discouraged from doing so due to the linear structure of missions and the lack of side content. Despite this, the gameplay formula established in Far Cry—placing the player in a foreign environment occupied by enemy forces where they must use various weapons and tools, as well as their surroundings to overcome any threat—would prove essential in defining the series' identity going forward.

Far Cry was released for Microsoft Windows in March 2004 to generally positive reviews, being praised for its visuals, gameplay mechanics, and the level of freedom given to players. The game was also a commercial success, selling over 730,000 units within four months of release and over 2.5 million units in its lifetime. The success of Far Cry led to a series of standalone sequels developed by Ubisoft, starting with Far Cry 2 in 2008. A remake of the game with a different storyline and new mechanics, Far Cry Instincts, was released for the Xbox in 2005, and for the Xbox 360 in 2006 as part of the Far Cry Instincts: Predator compilation. A loose film adaptation was released in 2008. The original version of Far Cry, updated with HD graphics, was re-released under the title Far Cry Classic for the PlayStation 3 and Xbox 360 in 2014.

== Gameplay ==
Far Cry is a standard first-person shooter set in an open-ended environment: an unidentified archipelago in the South Pacific. The tropical rain forest provides cover and concealment, of which both the player and enemies can take advantage. Enemies react dynamically to the player's tactics and actions. If a lone mercenary spots a player, he occasionally runs for help, signaling reinforcements through use of flareguns. Enemies will work together to outmaneuver, outflank, surround, and provide suppressive fire, providing them a tactical advantage over the player, who, in turn, is able to spot and mark enemies on their minimap through use of special binoculars, which also grant the player the ability to listen to enemy conversations from afar, merely by pointing the binoculars in the direction of the enemies. Later in the gameplay, thermo binoculars can be used to locate the heat signatures of enemies, that would be otherwise concealed by foliage or darkness.

The environment includes land, water, indoor and outdoor structures, all during various times of the day. The player has the ability to jump, run, crouch and lie down, and look about in all directions. Sound plays an important part in the overall gameplay. For example, the general location of enemies can often be identified by hearing their footsteps or conversations. Throughout the game, the player encounters a variety of weapons from which to choose, including automatic weapons and grenades.

The open maps allow the player to complete their objectives in several different manners. When outdoors, the player is usually presented with a fairly simple set of possible routes to their objective, but these do not necessarily have to be used. Outdoor map level designs are constructed in a way that allows the player to try different angles for assaults, or even completely circumvent enemies (given enough time to maneuver). However, during the indoor sections of the game, level design tends to lose this attribute in favor of a more traditional, linear gameplay.

=== Multiplayer ===
The game included three multiplayer modes: Deathmatch, Team Deathmatch, and 'Assault' - An attack/defend mode where one team must guard three bases and the other must capture them. Ubisoft closed the online servers in October 2015.

== Synopsis ==
=== Setting ===
The game's story follows a retired U.S. Army Special Forces soldier stranded on a mysterious archipelago. He is searching for a female journalist named Valerie Constantine, after she went missing when their boat was destroyed by mercenaries. The game includes thematic elements relating to the dangers of weaponizing genetic engineering and the genocide of local islanders as can be seen by the deformed creatures created by a mad scientist named Krieger.

The terrain in Far Cry varies greatly. Set on a South Pacific archipelago, the landscape includes beaches, dense rain forests, towering canyons, mines, swamps, and even volcanic forests. Many of the interiors range from simple beach huts and army camps to elaborate complexes, an underground temple, and ultra-modern research labs. Several of these mazes use the remains of Japanese World War II-era fortifications and bunkers.

=== Plot ===
Jack Carver has left his mysterious and bitter past behind him and dropped out of society to run a boat-charter business in the South Pacific. He is hired by a female journalist named Valerie Constantine to take her secretly to an uncharted island in Micronesia. After Val takes off on her own with a jet ski, Jack's boat is blown apart by a rocket, but he survives by diving into the water. With the help of a man named Doyle, Jack travels across the various islands, battling mysterious mercenaries in search for Val. Through encounters with Trigens (genetically altered beasts) and information from Doyle, Jack soon discovers that the island is part of an experiment involving genetic modification, funded by the genetic company Krieger Corp. and led by its CEO, Dr. Krieger.

As the game progresses, it becomes clear that the Trigens, who are running loose, are becoming too large a problem for the mercenaries to handle, and that the experiments are not limited to just primate mutations, but have moved on to mutating humans (possibly mercenaries). When Jack finally catches up with Val, she is being taken to another area by a helicopter which is stopped by Jack. After a brief struggle on board the helicopter, Val tells Jack to jump for it, kicking him in the face and they both fall from the helicopter as it explodes. After they both swim to shore, Val reveals that she is an undercover CIA agent investigating Krieger's operations. After further exploration, Jack must again search for and rescue Val while the human Trigens have escaped (freed by Jack) and have begun a revolt against the mercenaries on the island. After rescuing Val, they split up again and reunite when Jack has killed the mercenary commander, Crowe. Information Crowe had with him indicates Krieger has a tactical nuke on the island, which he intends to use as a last resort in covering his tracks should his projects be investigated.

After the Department of Defense has supposedly analyzed the situation, Jack and Val steal the nuclear weapon, despite Jack's protests. Before entering the factory, Doyle warns that the mutagen might infect them when the blast goes off, and advises them to take a mutagen-resistant serum before arming the nuke. Inside the factory, they do so and arm the nuke, which detonates directly behind Jack and Val as they exit the factory, leaving them unconscious. While the pair are unconscious, Krieger captures them before leaving to his main base in a helicopter. Jack, kicked off the helicopter, has to fight through the Trigen-infested area to rescue Val and escape the islands with his life. Upon reaching a mercenary weapons cache, Jack notices his arm is turning green. Doyle responds that the mutagen concentration on the air might be too strong for the antidote, but Krieger is working on a cure in a laboratory nearby. Jack is thus directed to find Krieger, who has injected himself with the mutagen but is ultimately defeated.

With his dying breath, Krieger reveals that there is no cure for the mutagen. Doyle reveals the "antidote" they took earlier was the very mutagen they were trying to protect themselves from and reveals that he plans to sell the mutagen formula on the black market before fleeing. After battling through a horde of Trigens, Jack catches up with Doyle and kills him. Jack then escapes just before the volcano, in which Krieger's main offices are located, erupts. Both he and Val are cured from the mutagen and manage to sail off on a boat.

== Development and release ==
Crytek developed a game engine called CryEngine for Far Cry. Reportedly, the game was born out of a technology demo called X-Isle: Dinosaur Island made by Crytek to showcase the capabilities of the Nvidia GeForce 3.

On June 10, 2013, Ubisoft announced Far Cry Classic would come to XBLA as part of Microsoft's 2013 Summer Arcade releases. The game was delayed to February 12, 2014. Far Cry Classic is an HD remake for PlayStation 3 and Xbox 360. The game is available as a standalone and part of a compilation called Far Cry: The Wild Expedition.

In June 2023, the game's source code was leaked online.

== Reception ==
Reception

Aggregate score
Aggregator	Score
Metacritic	89/100

Review scores
Publication	Score
Edge	8/10
Eurogamer	8/10
Game Informer	9.25/10
GamePro	4/5
GameRevolution	B+
GameSpot	9.2/10
GameSpy	4.5/5
GameZone	9.6/10
IGN	9.2/10
PC Gamer (US)	95%

Far Cry received "generally favorable" reviews, according to review aggregator website Metacritic. The game received runner-up placements for GameSpot's 2004 "Best Shooter" and "Best Graphics, Technical" awards across all platforms. It received multiple awards at the Deutscher Entwicklerpreis 2004, including "Best Full-Price Game".

=== Sales ===
Far Cry was a commercial success, with sales above 730,000 units after four months of release. It received a "Gold" certification from the Verband der Unterhaltungssoftware Deutschland for its performance through the end of June 2004. This indicated sales of at least 100,000 units across Germany, Switzerland and Austria. In the United States, Far Cry sold 350,000 copies and earned $11 million for Crytek by August 2006. At the time, this led Edge to declare it the country's 49th-best-selling computer game released since January 2000. It also earned a "Gold" sales award from the Entertainment and Leisure Software Publishers Association (ELSPA), for sales of at least 200,000 copies in the United Kingdom. In 2010, Crytek announced that the PC version of the game had sold over 2.5 million units overall.

== Legacy ==
On April 8, 2004, Ubisoft announced Far Cry Instincts for the Xbox. Far Cry Instincts is not a direct port of the original, being designed specifically for consoles. The game uses a similar premise to the original PC version, and the same game engine, but by comparison Instincts is less open-ended and more linear, due to the console's reduced processing power which prevents the full rendering of the PC version's vast islands and landscape. Additionally, Instincts features a significantly altered storyline, and new multiplayer modes, weapons, dual wielding and "feral abilities". PlayStation 2 and GameCube were also planned but were cancelled. Far Cry Instincts was exclusive to the Xbox and was released to acclaim in North America on September 27, 2005.

On March 28, 2006, Ubisoft released a sequel to Instincts, Far Cry Instincts: Evolution for the Xbox, which was met with less enthusiasm than the first versions of Far Cry. On the same day, for the Xbox 360, Far Cry Instincts: Predator was released, which essentially contains updated versions of Instincts and Evolution that can run in 720p or 1080i high-definition. Evolution includes a new single-player campaign, although it is considerably shorter than that of Far Cry Instincts. The storyline focuses on Jack Carver's work for a woman named Kade, which leads him to be hunted by local governments due to a frame-up during a botched arms deal. Jack again meets up with Doyle, who is practicing damage control, and eventually must battle a native warrior named Semeru who possesses the same "feral abilities" as Jack.

A remake of Far Cry Instincts: Evolution, titled Far Cry Vengeance, was released as part of Ubisoft's launch lineup for the Wii. In this version, the Wii Remote is used for many of the tasks assigned to buttons in previous iterations of the game, including driving vehicles, shooting, and running.

Crytek was commissioned by Electronic Arts to continue development on the Crytek engine, which led to their series of games, Crysis. As Crytek was locked into its contract with Electronic Arts, Ubisoft negotiated to hold the rights to Far Cry as well as a perpetual license for the CryEngine, which they continued to modify with their Dunia Engine. In 2008, Far Cry 2 was released, developed by Ubisoft Montreal. Far Cry 2 centers around the activities of a gun smuggler named The Jackal. Fan theories, based on the appearance of the Jackal as well as game files, claim that the Jackal was an aged Jack Carver. Far Cry 2's director, Clint Hocking, confirmed this was intentional in a 2021 interview, with the trauma of events of Far Cry leading Carver to turn to criminal smuggling ten years later. Several more Far Cry sequels have been released by Ubisoft since.

On October 2, 2008, a live-action film based on the video game was released in Germany and later on December 17, 2008, in American theaters, receiving overwhelmingly negative reviews. A reboot was planned in 2013, and later adapted into a Netflix series instead.
