= The Mighty Quest for Epic Loot =

2015 video game

- Developer: Ubisoft Montreal
- Publisher: Ubisoft
- Director: Arnaud Jamin
- Designer: Jean-Pascal Cambiotti
- Artists: Simon Dore; Geneviève Routhier
- Composer: Jamie Christopherson
- Platforms: Microsoft Windows; Android; iOS
- Release: Microsoft Windows: WW: 5 February 2015; Android, iOS: WW: 9 July 2019
- Genre: Action role-playing game
- Mode: Single-player

The Mighty Quest for Epic Loot was a free-to-play action role-playing video game developed by Ubisoft Montreal. The game combined castle building and dungeon crawling mechanics: each player built a castle filled with traps and monsters and then attacked other players' castles, earning gold and equipment. While the castle attacks were single player affairs, the game required the player to be online as the castles they attacked were those of other players. The game also received a mobile version in July 2019.

== Gameplay ==
The game was split into two parts: castle building and castle assault. In the castle building mode, the player placed rooms and filled them with traps, monsters, and obstacles. There were also objects that would generate gold and other resources each day, which doubled as objectives for attacking players to destroy for additional rewards. In the castle assault mode, players would play as one of four hero classes - the knight, archer, mage, and runaway - and attack other players' castles, trying to defeat their defenses to reach their treasury. If successful, the attacker would get some of the defender's gold. The rewards would depend on how long the assault took and whether all of the optional objectives were destroyed.

== Development ==
The Mighty Quest for Epic Loot entered closed Beta on June 10, 2013. Players could gain access to the closed Beta by signing up on the official website for a chance to receive a Beta key, or by purchasing one of the founder's (Double O) packs through the in-game store. The game was also made available on Steam through their Early Access program on November 18, 2013.

On January 27, 2014, the game's open Beta date was announced, and on February 11 the pre-open Beta pack was released, which included major changes to the game's castle defense and monetization systems. The game officially entered open Beta on February 25, 2014, for the PC.

Following the launch of Watch Dogs on May 27, 2014, Watch Dogs themed content and equipment was introduced to The Mighty Quest, both in-game and through a special add-on pack. The additions include new weapons, clothing and bandannas as well as a level 12 Watch Dogs castle to explore found in the Bling's Landing region. Ubisoft stated that the content would cease availability on July 1, 2014.

The game was released on February 5, 2015. Ubisoft announced that The Mighty Quest for Epic Loot would end all services and shut down on October 25, 2016.

=== Mobile port ===
On January 10, 2017, Ubisoft soft launched a mobile version for Android and iOS developed by Ubisoft Paris Mobile, without the castle-building portion. Netflix released a spinoff mobile game, Mighty Quest Rogue Palace, in 2023. It requires a Netflix subscription to play, but subscribers can play it for free.

== Reception ==
The Mighty Quest for Epic Loot received mixed reviews on Metacritic. Digitally Downloaded said it is an "incredible game" and is fun both raiding other castles and designing traps in your own. PCGamesN disliked the humor and criticized the game balance, which they said favored the attacking player. Gamezebo praised the control scheme and visuals, but they felt the in-app purchases were expensive and likely to cause the player versus player element to devolve into pay-to-win.
