= Typhoon Studios =

Canadian video game developer

Typhoon Studios Inc.
- Type: Subsidiary
- Industry: Video games
- Founded: February 2017; 9 years ago
- Founders: Alex Hutchinson; Yassine Riahi; Reid Schneider
- Defunct: February 1, 2021
- Successor: Raccoon Logic
- Headquarters: Montreal, Canada
- Key people: Alex Hutchinson (creative director); Reid Schneider (studio head, executive producer)
- Products: Journey to the Savage Planet
- Number of employees: 26 (2019)
- Parent: Stadia Games and Entertainment (2019–2021)

Typhoon Studios Inc. was a Canadian video game developer based in Montreal. Alex Hutchinson, Yassine Riahi, and Reid Schneider—veterans of EA Montreal, Ubisoft Montreal, and WB Games Montréal—founded the studio in February 2017 and began assembling a team to develop prototypes with early funding. The studio announced its debut game, Journey to the Savage Planet, in December 2018. A year later, Google acquired the studio for its Stadia Games and Entertainment division to develop for Stadia, its nascent cloud gaming service. Journey to the Savage Planet was released in January 2020 for the PlayStation 4, Windows, and the Xbox One, followed shortly by a Nintendo Switch version. Google closed Stadia Games and Entertainment on February 1, 2021, the same day as the game's Stadia release, and the entire Typhoon Studios team left the company. Hutchinson, Schneider, and three other former Typhoon Studios staffers subsequently established Raccoon Logic, which acquired the game's intellectual property and released a sequel, Revenge of the Savage Planet, in May 2025.

== History ==
Alex Hutchinson, Yassine Riahi, and Reid Schneider first worked together at EA Montreal on the 2010 game Army of Two: The 40th Day with Hutchinson as the creative director. He soon moved to Ubisoft Montreal, directing Assassin's Creed III (2012) and Far Cry 4 (2014). Schneider co-founded WB Games Montréal, and Riahi joined it to work on the Batman: Arkham series. The trio considered starting a company for several years but failed to find the right time due to financial instability or existing production schedules. In February 2017, they established Typhoon Studios in Montreal with Hutchinson as the creative director, Riahi as the technical director, and Schneider as the executive producer. They believed that having this combination of expertise at the outset was key to forming a video game studio. Schneider additionally served as the studio head. With the rising popularity of digital distribution, Schneider described a market largely split between small-scale indie games and big-budget AAA games, with very few mid-sized titles. The studio sought to occupy the latter space, in part because it lacked the budget of releases like Call of Duty. Hutchinson announced the studio's formation via Twitter on April 7.

The art director Erick Bilodeau, who had also worked at WB Games Montréal, became Typhoon Studios's first hire. Unwilling to pay to rent an office, they started out of a windowless motion capture studio fitted with IKEA desks and used office furniture from Craigslist. The studio briefly had a basement office that lacked air conditioning and was frequently beset by outside cigarette smoke. After securing enough funding, the company moved into a proper office space. Makers Fund, a nascent, gaming-focused venture capital firm from China, also invested in Typhoon Studios. According to Hutchinson, the studio was more successful among younger investors because others deemed video game successes unpredictable. The early funding allowed the studio to build a prototype it could pitch to several publishers during the 2018 Game Developers Conference, gaining the attention of 505 Games. The two companies entered into a long-term partnership in September 2018. Therein, Typhoon Studios retained ownership of the game's intellectual property (IP) and creative control over the game design. At the time, the studio had 20 employees, growing to 25 by December. During The Game Awards on December 6, Typhoon Studios announced its debut game as Journey to the Savage Planet.

On December 19, 2019, Google announced its acquisition of Typhoon Studios for its Stadia Games and Entertainment division, which developed games exclusively for Stadia, the cloud gaming service Google had launched a month prior. The studio of 26 people continued under the leadership of Hutchinson and Schneider and was aligned with the existing Montreal development team headed by Sébastien Puel. Jade Raymond, the division's head, cited the team's past AAA development experience as a key driver for the purchase. Hutchinson and Schneider were fond of Stadia and sought for Typhoon Studios to be able to work for a single platform and in direct collaboration with that platform's creators.

Journey to the Savage Planet was released for the PlayStation 4, Windows, and the Xbox One in January 2020, followed by a Nintendo Switch port in May. The studio subsequently explored ideas for licensed games, cloud gaming technology, and a sequel, eventually launching production on the latter. With the onset of the COVID-19 pandemic at this time, the Typhoon Studios team worked remotely and never entered Google's offices. A Stadia version was released on February 1, 2021, in an "Employee of the Month Edition" exclusive to the service. On the same day, Google announced the closure of Stadia Games and Entertainment and its studios in Montreal and Los Angeles. Around 150 people were affected, and the entire Typhoon Studios team left the company. Stadia had reportedly missed targets for hardware sales and monthly active users, the latter by hundreds of thousands. Hutchinson later argued that Google had unrealistic expectations for its games, such as being only feasible for cloud gaming, being universally liked, and having the scale of big-budget titles made by teams of several hundred people. While all internal game development ceased, a critical bug in Journey to the Savage Planet's Stadia version required Google to scramble for developers to resolve it three weeks later.

Following the closure, Hutchinson and Schneider worked with Bilodeau, the chief technology officer Yannick Simard, and the technical design director Marc-Antoine Lussier to establish Raccoon Logic. After initially being self-funded, Tencent provided the studio with a "large initial investment", allowing it to work on prototypes before reaching out to publishers. The studio then acquired the IP and source code of Journey to the Savage Planet from Google, as well as other unrealized work. 505 Games handed the studio the IP's publishing rights in exchange for future royalties on the original game. At the time the studio was announced on August 11, 2021, 75% of its staff were former Typhoon Studios workers. Raccoon Logic announced a sequel, Revenge of the Savage Planet, in August 2024. Using Tencent's funding, the studio self-published it in May 2025. By this time, Raccoon Logic had 30 employees, of whom roughly half were formerly of Typhoon Studios.
