= Army of Two (disambiguation) =

Army of Two is a video game series by Electronic Arts.

Army of Two may also refer to:

- Army of Two, the first game in the series
- Army of Two: The 40th Day (2010), the second game in the series
- Army of Two: The Devil's Cartel (2013), the third game in the series
- "Army of Two" (Dum Dums song), a 2001 song by the Dum Dums
- "Army of Two" (Olly Murs song), a 2013 song by Olly Murs
- American Army of Two, name commonly given to Rebecca and Abigail Bates
- "Army of Two", a school shooter duo in the Zero Day film
