= Savage Planet =

Savage Planet may refer to:

- "Savage Planet", a PBS television special
- Savage Planet (TV series), a British documentary series produced for ITV, first aired in 2000
- Savage Planet (film), a 2006 Sci Fi channel original film
- An alternative title for the 1973 animated science fiction film Fantastic Planet
- Savage Planet, a video game series
  - Journey to the Savage Planet, a 2020 first-person action-adventure game
  - Revenge of the Savage Planet, the 2025 sequel
