= AOT =

AOT may refer to:

== Arts and entertainment ==
- Attack on Titan, a Japanese manga series by Hajime Isayama
  - Attack on Titan (TV series), a Japanese anime series based on the manga

== Science and technology ==
- Abstract object theory
- Aerosol OT, a common chemical reagent; see Dioctyl sodium sulfosuccinate
- Aerosol Optical Thickness, a measure for the concentration of aerosols determined by light absorption from remote sensing data
- Ahead-of-time compilation, an implementation approach for programming languages
- Assisted outpatient treatment, an implementation of mental-health law in the U.S.

== Transport ==
- Aeronautical operations technician
- Airports of Thailand, an airport operator
- Aosta Airport (IATA code), Italy
- Autorité organisatrice de transports, a French legal structure for the provision of public transport
- A US Navy hull classification symbol: Transport oiler (AOT)

== Other uses ==
- Academy of Technology, an engineering college in West Bengal, India
- A.O. Trikala, a football club in Trikala, Greece
- Archives Office of Tasmania, government archives office of Tasmania, Australia
- Army of Two (disambiguation)
