= Alex Hutchinson (video game director) =

Australian video game director and designer

- Born: Australia
- Education: Melbourne University
- Occupations: Video game director and designer
- Known for: Co-founder of Typhoon Studios

Alex Hutchinson is an Australian video game director and designer. He is best known for his work as the creative director for Ubisoft's Assassin's Creed III and Far Cry 4. After a long stint at Ubisoft, he has since co-founded his own video game development company, Typhoon Studios.

== Career ==
Hutchinson began his career in the games industry as a designer at Torus Games in Australia but quickly left for an opportunity at Electronic Arts subsidiary Maxis. There, he worked as a Lead Designer on the popular gaming series, The Sims, as well as leading the design on Spore. In 2008, he moved to Canada to take on a role as Creative Director at EA Montreal, working on Army of Two: The 40th Day. He later transitioned to Ubisoft Montreal, where he served as Creative Director for Assassin's Creed III and Far Cry 4. Assassin's Creed III was showcased at E3 2012, and Far Cry 4 at E3 2014, where it was presented by Hutchinson himself.

In 2017, Hutchinson co-founded Typhoon Studios, a video game studio based in Montreal, with his partners Yassine Riahi and Reid Schneider. The studio gained attention when its first game, Journey to the Savage Planet, was announced at the 2018 Game Awards. In December 2019, Google, under its Stadia brand, acquired Typhoon Studios. However, Typhoon Studios, along with Google's Stadia Games and Entertainment (SG&E) division, was shut down in February 2021. However, the development team behind Journey to the Savage Planet, including Hutchinson, Schneider, Yannick Simard, Erick Bilodeau, and Marc-Antoine Lussier, reunited and founded Raccoon Logic in 2021.

== Works ==
| Video games | Year released | Role |
|---|---|---|
| The Sims 2 | 2004 & 2005 | Lead Designer |
| The Simpsons Game | 2007 | Additional Design |
| Spore | 2008 | Lead Designer |
| Army of Two: The 40th Day | 2010 | Creative Director |
| Assassin's Creed III | 2012 | Creative Director |
| Far Cry 4 | 2014 | Creative Director |
| Journey to the Savage Planet | 2020 | Creative Director |
| Revenge of the Savage Planet | 2025 | Creative Director |

== Controversies ==
On October 22, 2020, Alex Hutchinson tweeted the following:

The real truth is the streamers should be paying the developers and publishers of the games they stream. They should be buying a license like any real business and paying for the content they use.

Which generated public backlash. Following, Google stated that what Hutchinson said does not represent the company's vision.
