= Revenge of the Savage Planet =

2025 video game

- Developer: Raccoon Logic
- Publisher: Raccoon Logic
- Director: Alex Hutchinson
- Producer: Noémie L'Écuyer
- Designer: Steve Masters
- Artist: Erick Bilodeau
- Composer: Samuel Laflamme
- Series: Savage Planet
- Engine: Unreal Engine 5
- Platforms: Microsoft Windows; PlayStation 4; PlayStation 5; Xbox Series X/S
- Release: May 8, 2025
- Genre: Action-adventure
- Modes: Single-player, multiplayer

Revenge of the Savage Planet is a 2025 action-adventure game developed and published by Raccoon Logic. It is the sequel to Journey to the Savage Planet (2020), and was released for PlayStation 4, PlayStation 5, Windows, and Xbox Series X/S on May 8, 2025. The game received generally positive reviews from critics.

== Gameplay ==
In the game, which is played from third-person, the player can use the Proton Whip Tether to attach to grapple points and swing over great distance.

Unlike its predecessor, Revenge of the Savage Planet is played from a third-person perspective. In the game, the player assumes control of a space explorer who is abandoned by their employer in a remote planet with no gear or equipment. The player character must survive the hostile environments of different planets, repair their spacecraft, and find a way back to Earth to exact their revenge on their former employer. The game features four main planets (Stellaris Prime, Xephyr, Quasadron IX and Zenithian Rift), each of whom has their own unique landscapes. A fifth planet is unlocked after the player completes the game's story. The player needs to scan each planet's flora and fauna in order to learn their secrets and unlock upgrades. The game adopts elements commonly found in Metroidvania games. Certain areas in the game may be inaccessible until a corresponding traversal upgrade is unlocked. Unlockable gadgets include the Proton Whip Tether, which allows players to use grapple points to zip across gaps, the Hawx Rail Grinder which allows players to grind on rails, and the Goo Ingestor, which enables players to spray the environment with water, lava, and acid.

The player can build their home base on Stellaris Prime, the game's starting planet. In this base, players will be able to add new facilities and rooms, unlocking new abilities and equipment for the player character. As players progress and explore the planets, they will encounter hostile, aggressive enemies. Some of these creatures can be stunned and captured, enabling players to begin researching them, unlocking new upgrades and color palettes for the player character's outfit. The game supports both local split-screen and online two-player cooperative multiplayer.

== Development and release ==
Typhoon Studios, the developer for Journey of the Savage Planet, was shut down by Google in February 2021 after it decided to pivot away from video game development and discontinue the streaming device Google Stadia. The core team of Typhoon Studios reorganized itself as an independent video game studio named Raccoon Logic in 2021, and negotiated with Google and publisher 505 Games to maintain control of the Savage Planet intellectual property.

The game was developed by a team of 30 people. The team's tumultuous experience following the closure of Typhoon Studios and the game's unusual development inspired its comedic tone, described by director Alex Hutchinson as "optimistic yet funny dystopia". The humor in the game was self-referential, and was designed to be more "pointed" than its predecessor. The team was also inspired by the 2022–2025 video game industry layoffs, and the story served as a satire on late-stage capitalism. Silicon Valley also influenced the game's humor.

The game's level design was inspired by Metroid Prime. The studio wanted to give players more freedom to approach their objectives, and included various traversal tools in the player character's arsenal. Lead designer Steve Masters added that the game's third-person perspective allowed the player character to have more personality, while enabling the team to "bring more humor to the character" and improve the game's platforming gameplay. The running animation of the player character was inspired by "people who have to run through the surf at the beach". Slapstick comedy, in particular, influenced the team. The team also wanted players to create "organic chaos" with the game's tools and gadgets, with Hutchinson being inspired by his time creating emergent gameplay for Far Cry 4. The game is developed using Unreal Engine 5.

Revenge of the Savage Planet was announced in August 2024. The game was released for PlayStation 4, PlayStation 5, Windows, and Xbox Series X/S on May 8, 2025. Players who purchased the "Cosmic Hoarder Edition" can access the game three days earlier. It also included access to four exclusive quest chains as well as a three-day early access period.

== Reception ==
Reception

Aggregate scores
Aggregator	Score
Metacritic	(PC) 76/100 (PS5) 80/100 (XSX) 79/100
OpenCritic	75% recommend

Review scores
Publication	Score
Eurogamer	3/5
Game Informer	8.5/10
GameSpot	8/10
GamesRadar+	3.5/5

Revenge of the Savage Planet received "generally favorable" reviews from critics, according to review aggregator website Metacritic. Fellow review aggregator OpenCritic assessed that the game received strong approval, being recommended by 75% of critics.

Shaun Cichacki from Vice highly recommended the game and described it as "a Nickelodeon show for adults", praising its vibrant visuals, its "crude and crass humor", as well as its exploration gameplay mechanics, though he felt its combat was one of its weak points. Richard Wakeling from GameSpot commented that "Revenge of the Savage Planet is a bigger and better sequel, stretching out its joyful mix of platforming, exploration, and puzzle-solving across four diverse and lively planets". He liked the game's Metroidvania design and its sense of progression. While he felt that the story offered a "pointed satire of corporate greed", he was disappointed by the shift in the story's direction towards the end of the game. Brian Shea, writing for Game Informer, praised the design of the game's locations for offering "compelling discoveries", encouraging players to explore off the beaten track. He felt the game was a significant improvement over its predecessor, describing it as a "far more complete and rewarding package".

Justin Towell from GamesRadar praised the game's shift to third-person perspective for adding personality to the player character, as well as the game's visuals, describing it as a "technical tour de force with massive draw distances". However, he criticised the humor in the game for being "grating", describing them as "noise detracting from what would otherwise be an enjoyable adventure". Both Towell and Robert Purchese from Eurogamer felt that early segments of the game was too slow as it locked essential upgrades from players. While Purchese wrote that the game was "bold and kaleidoscopically colourful" and occasionally charming, it was not as "wild and carefree as it wants to be", noting that the challenges involved in unlocking upgrades can be tedious and exhausting.
