= Army of Two: The Devil's Cartel =

2013 video game

- Developers: Visceral Games; EA Montreal
- Publisher: Electronic Arts
- Designer: Julien Lamoureux
- Programmer: Nathan Brierley
- Artists: Marco Beauchemin; Robert Clarke; Audran Guerard
- Writer: Jay Turner
- Composer: Brian Tyler
- Series: Army of Two
- Engine: Frostbite 2
- Platforms: PlayStation 3 Xbox 360
- Release: NA: March 26, 2013; AU: March 28, 2013; EU: March 29, 2013
- Genre: Third-person shooter
- Modes: Single-player, multiplayer

Army of Two: The Devil's Cartel is a third-person shooter video game developed by the Montreal branch of Visceral Games and released on March 26, 2013 by Electronic Arts for the Xbox 360 and PlayStation 3. It is the third and final game in the Army of Two series, following 2008's Army of Two and 2010's Army of Two: The 40th Day. The game takes place in Mexico and pits T.W.O. against a drug cartel known as La Guadaña (Spanish for "the Scythe"). It is the first game in the series to run on the Frostbite 2 game engine, whereas the previous two ran on Unreal Engine 3. It was the second to last game developed by Visceral Montreal. The Devil's Cartel received mixed reviews and sold over 260,000 units.

== Gameplay ==
Whereas the last two games focused around characters Salem and Rios, Army of Two: The Devil's Cartel focuses around two new T.W.O. operatives named Alpha and Bravo. The reasoning behind the unidentified names is to give the player the feeling that it is them fighting through the missions.

Returning from the first game is the Overkill mode, which makes both players invincible for a short period of time. However, features such as back to back, playing rock, paper and scissors with your partner, and other co-op interactions have been removed in favor of more fast-paced gameplay. Competitive multiplayer from the second game does not return to focus on a richer co-op experience.

=== Features ===
It has been noted that the game features more customization options compared to the previous games in the series. The Devil's Cartel features a mask creator which allows players to completely customize their masks, thus giving their TWO operative its own persona. Customers can pre-order the Overkill Edition which comes with bonus weapons, masks, outfits, and missions that are not available with the standard version of the game.

== Plot ==
Shortly after being recruited into T.W.O. (Tactical Worldwide Operations), T.W.O. founders Tyson Rios and Elliot Salem bring Alpha and Bravo on a rescue operation to save multiple hostages in a cartel compound. Estaban Bautista and his henchman flee as Rios, Salem, Alpha, and Bravo raid the compound. Only one hostage is found alive, a girl named Fiona. Salem attempts to persuade the group to leave, not wanting to risk their lives to save Fiona, who is not part of their mission objective; Rios insists that she's innocent and that he won't leave her behind. Alpha and Bravo agree, and Salem decides to go alone and leave. During Salem's escape, a thug destroys Salem's vehicle, leaving Rios, Alpha, and Bravo attempting to rescue him, but Rios injures his right leg in the process. Alpha and Bravo save the girl from the cartel and evacuate with Rios.

Five years later, T.W.O. is hired by Mayor Cordova, a Mexican politician seeking to bring down La Guadaña and kill its leader, Bautista. The T.W.O. operatives believe nothing will go wrong until the convoy's movement is interrupted by La Guadaña's forces. Alpha and Bravo survive constant waves as Cordova escapes. Alpha and Bravo push their way to the Cartel's forces to City Hall for extraction. T.W.O. operative Mason drives them out of the city but is killed when the Cartel ambushes them on the road at a gas station. Alpha and Bravo meet Mason's contact, revealed to be Fiona, who assists the team in bringing down La Guadaña and killing Bautista. Fiona gives Alpha and Bravo intelligence that Cordova fled to a local church that is serving as a La Guadaña compound.

Alpha and Bravo fight through a hotel resort to encounter El Diablo, La Guadaña's top lieutenant, learning that El Diablo killed a number of T.W.O. operatives and captured Cordova. El Diablo sets off charges in the hotel resort to make his escape leaving Alpha, Bravo, and Fiona trapped inside. They survive El Diablo's counterattack, and the trio goes to the church, listening in on Bautista's interrogation with Cordova. El Diablo alerts them as the duo fight their way to Fiona. Surviving a train disaster, Alpha, Bravo, and Fiona temporarily rescue Cordova while surviving T.W.O. operatives die protecting the mayor. Alpha, Bravo, and Cordova navigate through a Mexican ghetto and are captured after trying to rescue T.W.O. operative Bradley.

Alpha, Bravo, and Cordova are tortured by the cartel in a room. El Diablo reveals his true identity as Salem, who survived the explosion and was forced to face the Cartel by himself. Surviving, he joined forces with Bautista and feels betrayed by Rios and the duo for not checking to see if he was alive. Salem kills Cordova and leaves. Alpha and Bravo escape and regroup with T.W.O. operatives "Baker" and "Chuy". Rios hears of Salem's betrayal and orders him to be kept alive and brought to him.

Fiona tells the team that Salem and Bautista are hiding at a hacienda. Alpha, Bravo, Baker, and Chuy lead a T.W.O. strike force with assistance from Mexican Special Forces to raid the hacienda. During the raid, Bautista kills Chuy and Baker. Fiona pursues him but is captured and relocated to a quarry. Alpha and Bravo are extracted by Rios via helicopter to rescue Fiona.

The trio crash as Alpha and Bravo save Rios, who tells them to go ahead and get Fiona. Alpha and Bravo reach Fiona, who kills Bautista for taking her. However, Salem reveals that killing him was part of his plan and holds Fiona at gunpoint. Salem tells of the times he risked his life for Rios (especially to "save Shanghai" and taking a bullet for Rios, implied of the previous installment), and kills Fiona. Rios charges at Salem, and Salem shoots Rios in the abdomen and throws him off of a two-story balcony before escaping.

Alpha and Bravo regroup with Rios, who now orders them to kill Salem. Alpha and Bravo corner Salem, who attacks them with an armored vehicle. Destroying the vehicle, Bravo is given the command to kill Salem, but instead, allows the Mexican Special Forces to take him into custody. Rios, Alpha, and Bravo promise to oversee Fiona's burial, carry out an extended vacation, and then sign on for the next mission. Meanwhile, Salem etches the name Alice on his prison cell wall. In the post-credits epilogue, Salem is seen smiling when an armored guard and an unidentified visitor approach him.

== Development ==
=== Alternative characters ===
EA said at the time that purchasers who pre-order the game could play with characters based upon B.o.B and Big Boi. The hip hop artists have collaborated on the game's theme song "Double or Nothing", produced by SoFLY and Nius and Oddfellow, and appear in game as T.W.O. operatives Charles 'Chuy' Rendall (Big Boi) and Anthony 'Baker' Barnes (B.o.B), sent to take down the cartels in Mexico.

== Reception ==
Reception

Aggregate score
Aggregator	Score	
Aggregator	PS3	Xbox 360
Metacritic	58/100	54/100

Review scores
Publication	Score	
Publication	PS3	Xbox 360
Destructoid	N/A	4/10
Digital Trends	N/A	2.5/5
Edge	N/A	4/10
Electronic Gaming Monthly	N/A	5/10
Eurogamer	N/A	5/10
Famitsu	29/40	N/A
Game Informer	N/A	6.5/10
GameRevolution	N/A	3/10
GameSpot	5/10	5/10
GameTrailers	N/A	6.4/10
IGN	5/10	5/10
PlayStation Official Magazine – UK	6/10	N/A
Official Xbox Magazine (US)	N/A	7.5/10
Polygon	N/A	5/10
The Escapist	N/A	3.5/5
National Post	4.5/10	N/A

Army of Two: The Devil's Cartel received "mixed" reviews on both platforms according to the review aggregation website Metacritic. In Japan, where the game was ported for release on March 28, 2013 (the same release date as the Australian import), Famitsu gave the PlayStation 3 version a score of 29 out of 40.

Daniel Krupa of IGN criticized the enemy AI as moronic, insipid environments, cover mechanics being frustrating, the gameplay being monotonous, but praised the ally AI for being reliable. In the Verdict, Krupa said: "Devil's Cartel feels like a hollowed-out version of the previous Army of Two games. The distinctive edges have been sanded down, creating something that's not just generic but unrelated to what went before. The humor has been drained and long-time fans might feel aggrieved by the decision to sideline Salem and Rios in favor of these lame characters. If you absolutely must experience the mediocrity first hand, Army of Two: Devil's Cartel is still probably best played with a friend... but friends don't let friends play tedious mediocre games."

Richard Grisham of GamesRadar+ found the Xbox 360 version to be fun. Grisham stated at the end of his review: "Army of Two: Devil's Cartel seems to accomplish exactly what it set out to do, offering an intense, impressive two-player co-op experience that's heavily customizable and replayable. While it won't likely scratch the itch of those looking for a more traditional shooter game--namely, competitive online multiplayer--it's an original concept set inside familiar trappings."

On the more negative side, Kevin VanOrd of GameSpot criticized all of the series' best aspects being removed or toned down, the gunplay being forgettable, forgettable story and characters, the cooperation between players being very little, and problems with the AI but praised some of the fun set pieces, the more open levels give you room to maneuver, and cover system encourages fluid movement. VanOrd said in the verdict: "Previous Army of Two games stood apart in their own ways, not always excelling, but still willing to hew their own paths. Engaging the opposition in a Shanghai zoo, escaping across a collapsed skyscraper, saving civilians from menacing threats--these are small but meaningful moments that might be etched on your psyche from the series' past. There's nothing here to make a mark: no creativity on display, no clever competitive modes, no sense of accomplishment. There's only a seven-hour campaign, optional missions in which you try to keep the overkill meter consistently replenished, and the knowledge that in a month, you won't remember having played Army of Two: The Devil's Cartel."

Dan Whitehead of Eurogamer said at the end of his review of the Xbox 360 version: "The Devil's Cartel is functional and fuss-free, a game that delivers the expected genre tropes with as little imagination and as much bluster as possible. It's not a bad game, but nor does it have anything beyond basic mechanical competence to mark it out as "good" – and even that competence wobbles more than it should. In a few years' time, I'll probably look back over my Xbox Live profile and be surprised to see that not only did they make a third Army of Two game, but that I apparently played and completed it."

Joshua Vanderwall of The Escapist gave the Xbox 360 version a score of three-and-a-half stars out of five, saying, "Ultimately, Army of Two: The Devil's Cartel is easy to pick up and fun to play, but generally lacks in distinction. The co-op centered gameplay is a neat trick, but it doesn't do enough with the co-op mechanics to really set itself apart." However, Rob Kershaw of The Digital Fix gave the same console version five out of ten, saying, "The biggest criticism of Army of Two: The Devil's Cartel comes down to how utterly tedious and derivative it is." David Jenkins of Metro also gave it five out of ten, calling it "A masterpiece of mediocrity and a crowning achievement in unambitiousness." Steve Tilley and Daniel Barron of Toronto Sun gave the same console version two-and-a-half stars out of five, with the former reviewer saying, "The Army of Two games have always been overshadowed by Call of Duty and Gears of War and the other shooter juggernauts, but they had unique co-op gameplay elements and a goofy charm that set them apart. Both of these things are mostly missing in The Devil's Cartel, and that's a damn shame." Chad Sapieha of National Post gave the PlayStation 3 version 4.5 out of 10, saying, "The very definition of a mindless shooter, EA Montreal's latest — the third in the middling Army of Two series — is a stripped down, by-the-book, bereft-of-imagination bang-bang that left me less satisfied than a parched man served a salt lick and an empty glass."

Responding to the negative response, Visceral Games executive producer Julian Beak said that the game suffered "low morale".

=== Sales ===
The game was not successful as EA's previous month releases, due to the game being released the same month as Tomb Raider and BioShock Infinite. The game sold over 260,000 units worldwide.
