= Journey to the Savage Planet =

2020 video game

- Developer: Typhoon Studios
- Publisher: 505 Games
- Director: Alex Hutchinson
- Producer: Reid Schneider
- Designer: Jean Pellerin
- Programmer: Yassine Riahi
- Artist: Erick Bilodeau
- Writers: Alex Hutchinson; Delilah Beef Lanno
- Composer: Brian D'Oliveira
- Series: Savage Planet
- Engine: Unreal Engine 4
- Platforms: Windows; PlayStation 4; Xbox One; Nintendo Switch; Stadia; PlayStation 5; Xbox Series X/S
- Release: Windows, PS4, Xbox One; January 28, 2020; Nintendo Switch; May 21, 2020; Stadia; February 1, 2021; PS5, Xbox Series X/S; February 14, 2023
- Genres: Action-adventure, metroidvania
- Modes: Single-player, multiplayer

Journey to the Savage Planet is a 2020 action-adventure game developed by Typhoon Studios and published by 505 Games. It was originally released for Windows, PlayStation 4 and Xbox One on January 28, 2020, followed by a Nintendo Switch port on May 21, 2020. An upgraded version of the game titled Journey to the Savage Planet: Employee of the Month Edition was released for Stadia as a timed exclusive (due to Google's ownership of the studio) on February 1, 2021, and for PlayStation 5 and Xbox Series X/S on February 14, 2023.

A sequel developed and published by Raccoon Logic, titled Revenge of the Savage Planet, was released for PlayStation 4, PlayStation 5, Windows, and Xbox Series X/S on May 8, 2025.

== Gameplay ==
Journey to the Savage Planet is an action-adventure game played from a first-person perspective. In the game, players are tasked to explore ARY-26, a colorful planet inhabited by various alien lifeforms such as Pufferbird, Barfer, and Floopsnoot. The player's main task is to catalogue various alien flora and fauna, and collect the resources needed to craft new items and upgrades, such as jetpacks and grappling hooks, which enable the players to reach previously inaccessible areas. Players will encounter various hostile lifeforms, which can be defeated using weapons such as laser guns and throwable items such as acid grenades. The game can be played cooperatively with another player.

== Premise ==
As an employee of Kindred Aerospace, the "4th Best Interstellar Exploration Company", the player must explore an uncharted planet named ARY-26 to see if it would be suitable for future human colonization.

== Development and release ==
Journey to the Savage Planet was directed by Alex Hutchinson, the director of Assassin's Creed III and Far Cry 4, and it was the debut project for Typhoon Studios. About 20-30 people worked on the game, and the game's development started in late 2017. The team wanted to make the game a very focused experience, thus they avoided adding many features that were considered as "extras" in other triple A titles. Elements from Metroidvania games were incorporated into the game, and the team introduced a lot of hidden content to encourage players to explore the world. In comparison to standard video games the game was designed to be shorter and easier than most modern titles, this was done so that players would not "see it as a liability". Speaking of the game's tone, Hutchinson called the game an "earnest comedy" and that the title was "very much more in the fiction side of science fiction". The game's dialogue was designed to be humorous, but the team ensured that players can create funny moments on purpose or by accident via the title's various interconnected gameplay systems. Metroid Prime, the Far Cry series and Subnautica influenced the game's design, while the game's bright visual style was inspired by films such as Men in Black and Ghostbusters. The game incorporates elements from Pioneer, a cancelled game that Hutchinson was working on at Ubisoft. The team took influence from the Golden Age of Science Fiction specifically the optimism expressed in those works.

Hutchinson announced the game during The Game Awards 2018. Publisher 505 Games released the game on PlayStation 4, Xbox One, and Microsoft Windows (via the Epic Games Store) on January 28, 2020. Due to the relatively light content Hutchinson chose to release the game at a budget price of $30 which he hoped would help players "take a risk with a new IP". A Nintendo Switch port was released on May 21, 2020.

On December 19, 2019, Google acquired Typhoon Studios and placed it under Stadia Games and Entertainment (SG&E), the division developing games exclusively for Stadia, Google's cloud gaming service. The studio was integrated with SG&E's existing Montreal studio, which was headed up by Sébastien Puel. Journey to the Savage Planet was not part of the acquisition. A Stadia version of Journey of the Savage Planet was released by SG&E on February 1, 2021. On the same day, Google shut down SG&E and its internal studios, with all former Typhoon Studios staff leaving the company. Due to these closures, the developers became unable to fix several bugs present in the Stadia version, including hangs and crashes. 505 Games stated that all assets of the Stadia version were owned by Google and SG&E, therefore the publisher could not resolve the situation. Google eventually released a patch on February 23.

Former members of Typhoon Studios established a new studio Raccoon Logic in August 2021, with some funding support from Tencent. Through negotiation, they were able to retain the intellectual property rights to Savage Planet and the planned sequel that Typhoon had been working on at Google, Revenge of the Savage Planet.

== Reception ==
Reception

Aggregate scores
Aggregator	Score
Metacritic	PC: 76/100; PS4: 74/100; XONE: 76/100; NS: 78/100
OpenCritic	76% recommend

Review scores
Publication	Score
Destructoid	8.5/10
GameSpot	7/10
GamesRadar+	4/5
IGN	6/10
Nintendo Life	8/10
PC Gamer (UK)	84/100
The Guardian	3/5

Journey to the Savage Planet received "generally favorable" reviews from critics for all platforms, except for the PlayStation 4 version which received "mixed or average" reviews, according to review aggregator website Metacritic. Fellow review aggregator OpenCritic assessed that the game received strong approval, being recommended by 76% of critics.
