= Army of Two =

Third-person shooter video game series

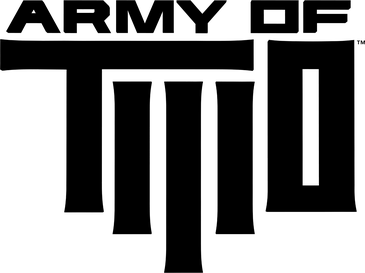
- Genre: Third-person shooter
- Developers: EA Montreal; Visceral Games
- Publisher: Electronic Arts
- Platforms: PlayStation 3, PlayStation Portable, Xbox 360
- First release: Army of Two; March 4, 2008
- Latest release: Army of Two: The Devil's Cartel; March 26, 2013

Army of Two is a third-person shooter video game series developed by EA Montreal. The first game in the series, Army of Two, was released on March 6, 2008 for the Xbox 360 and PlayStation 3 consoles. Focusing on cooperative strategies, Army of Two's main feature is the necessity to use coordinated teamwork to accomplish the game's goals. While the game is meant to be played with another human as a partner, a "Partner Artificial Intelligence" (PAI) is also included and programmed to follow the player's strategies. Dependence on a partner (whether human or PAI) is so pronounced that most objectives are impossible to complete without it. A sequel, Army of Two: The 40th Day, was released in January 2010 in North America and Europe. The third game in the series, Army of Two: The Devil's Cartel, was released on March 26, 2013 by Electronic Arts for the Xbox 360 and PlayStation 3.

== Games ==
Aggregate review scores
Game	Metacritic
Army of Two	(PS3) 74/100 (X360) 72/100
Army of Two: The 40th Day	(PS3) 74/100 (X360) 73/100 (PSP) 49/100
Army of Two: The Devil's Cartel	(PS3) 58/100 (X360) 54/100

== Characters ==
- Tyson Rios - Tyson Rios originally worked as a mercenary for the private military contractor SSC (Security and Strategy Corporation) with his long-time partner Elliot Salem. They later left SSC to form their own private military firm called T.W.O (Tactical Worldwide Operations). Rios' life of combat eventually came to a tragic end from a car explosion, leading to a badly injured left leg and the presumed death of Salem. Unable to continue to work in the field, Rios commands T.W.O operatives as an executive.
- Elliot Salem - Elliot Salem, together with his long-time partner Tyson Rios, originally worked as mercenaries for the private military contractor SSC (Security and Strategy Corporation) and later founded T.W.O. (Tactical Worldwide Operations). His actions appear by choices in Army of Two: The 40th Day; the ending is chosen from Jonah and is canon for Army of Two: The Devil's Cartel. Salem went insane after a seemingly fatal incident caused his partner and two other T.W.O. operatives, Alpha and Bravo, to abandon him to save hostage Fiona. This caused him to become a villain alongside his boss Bautista in The Devil's Cartel.
- Alpha - One of the two playable characters in Army of Two: The Devil's Cartel . His name is not revealed so that the player may "project themselves into the character a bit more". Alpha is considered the de facto leader of the pair since he is often the one who comes up with the ideas and battle plans. He also keeps his hot-headed partner Bravo in check during tough situations and does his best to steer him in the right direction in order to complete the mission.
- Bravo - The other playable character in Army of Two: The Devil's Cartel. His name is not revealed so that the player may "project themselves into the character a bit more". While Alpha is focused, calm and collected in battle, Bravo is the complete opposite: he's gung-ho, tough as nails and always ready for a fight. Besides that, he is mostly a funny, wise-guy comedian who loves to cracks jokes and make fun (especially of Alpha).

== Other media ==
=== Graphic novel ===
Army of Two: Dirty Money, written by John Ney Rieber and illustrated by Brandon McKinney, is a 2008 graphic novel which follows Rios and Salem through some of their earliest missions together working as private military contractors. The plot follows the corruption of the company they work for. Rios and Salem work together as an "army of two", trying to stay alive and uncover the conspiracy within the company that employs them.

=== Comic ===
A six-issue miniseries called Army of Two: Across the Border was released in January 2010 by IDW Publishing and coincided with the release of the sequel game Army of Two: The 40th Day, with events taking place between the first and the second game.

=== Film ===
In 2008, there was a report that Universal Pictures had picked up the film rights to the game, citing Universal's desire to "fast-track the project to begin production in 2009" and hiring Scott Z. Burns to write the script. Nothing came of it and the project is cancelled.
