= EA Montreal =

Canadian video game developer

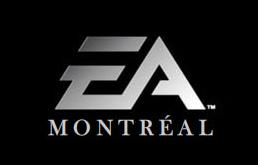
- Company type: Subsidiary
- Industry: Video games
- Founded: March 17, 2004
- Headquarters: Montreal, Quebec, Canada
- Key people: Alain Tascan
- Products: Army of Two series
- Number of employees: 849
- Parent: Electronic Arts

EA Montreal is a Canadian video game development studio owned and operated by Electronic Arts. The studio is based in Montreal, Quebec. It was inaugurated by EA on March 17, 2004.

In April 2012, EA announced layoffs in EA Montreal's Mobile division, which developed games as Rock Band (iOS) and Rock Band Unplugged. A further layoff on the Mobile Division took place in February 2015.

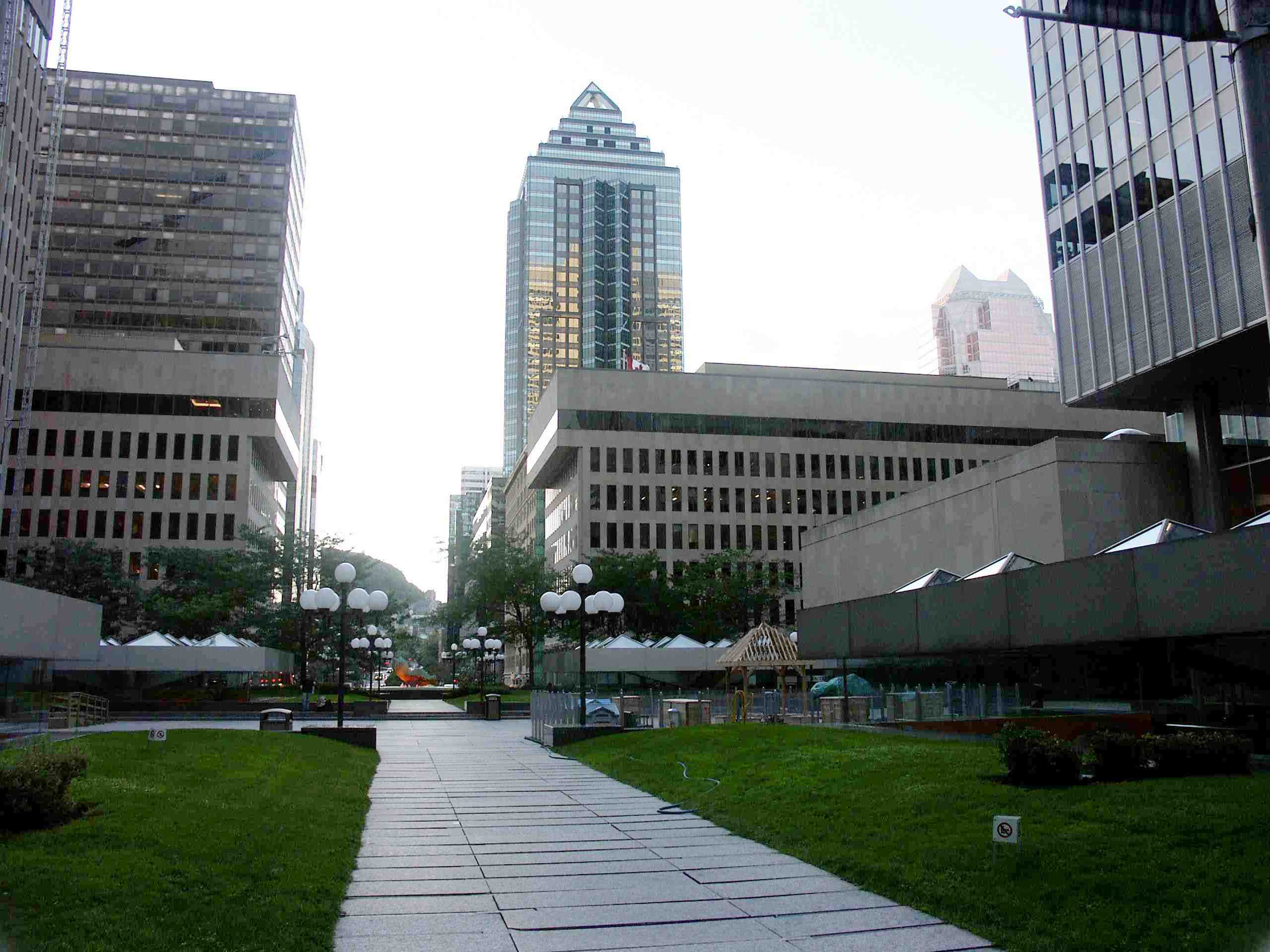
The view of Place Ville-Marie 3 (on the right) - the location of EA Montreal

== Games ==
Year	Game	Platform(s)							
Year	Game	PS2	Xbox	Win	PSP	Wii	NDS	PS3	X360
2005	SSX on Tour	No	No	No	Yes	No	No	No	No
2006	NHL 07	Yes	Yes	Yes	No	No	No	No	No
2007	SSX Blur	No	No	No	No	Yes	No	No	No
2007	Boogie	Yes	No	No	No	Yes	Yes	No	No
2008	Army of Two	No	No	No	No	No	No	Yes	Yes
2008	Boogie Superstar	No	No	No	No	Yes	No	No	No
2008	Skate It	No	No	No	No	Yes	No	No	No
2009	Spore Hero	No	No	No	No	Yes	No	No	No
2009	Need for Speed: Nitro	No	No	No	No	Yes	Yes	No	No
2010	Army of Two: The 40th Day	No	No	No	No	No	No	Yes	Yes
2010	The Sims 3: High-End Loft Stuff	No	No	Yes	No	No	No	No	No
2013	Army of Two: The Devil's Cartel	No	No	No	No	No	No	Yes	Yes
