= Army of Two (video game) =

2008 video game

- Developer: EA Montreal
- Publisher: Electronic Arts
- Producer: Reid Schneider
- Designers: Chris Ferriera; Vander Caballero
- Artist: Hugo Dallaire
- Writers: Corey May; Dooma Wendschuh; Keith Arem
- Composer: Trevor Morris
- Series: Army of Two
- Engine: Unreal Engine 3
- Platforms: PlayStation 3 Xbox 360
- Release: NA: March 4, 2008; EU: March 7, 2008; AU: March 13, 2008
- Genre: Third-person shooter
- Modes: Single-player, multiplayer

Army of Two is a third-person shooter video game developed and published by Electronic Arts and released on March 4, 2008 for the Xbox 360 and PlayStation 3 consoles. The game is centered upon two mercenaries fighting through war, political turmoil, and a conspiracy from 1993 to 2009. Focusing on cooperative strategies, Army of Two's main feature is the necessity to use coordinated teamwork to accomplish the game's goals. While the game is meant to be played with another human as a partner, a "Partner Artificial Intelligence" (PAI) is also included and programmed to follow the player's strategies. Dependence on a partner (whether human or PAI) is so pronounced that most objectives are impossible to complete without it.

Army of Two is one of the first games released for the Xbox 360 and PlayStation 3 consoles that feature region-locked online play. EA claims that the region-locking is to prevent network lag caused by players from multiple regions, and to prevent the Asian region console owners from playing the U.S. and European version of the game, as the Asian version has been censored to meet certain requirements (notably, the shooting of already dead bodies in the game). Electronic Arts shut down the online multiplayer servers for the game on August 11, 2011.

Critics praised its cooperative gameplay but criticized its artificial intelligence and difficulty. Army of Two debuted in positive sales at release. A sequel titled Army of Two: The 40th Day was released in 2010.

== Gameplay ==
=== Gear ===
The player can upgrade their armor to make it better and stronger but these cannot be purchased and are unlocked as the player progresses through campaign mode. The players start with Basic body armor, upgrade to Medium after completing the Afghanistan mission, and are granted Heavy body armor after the Aircraft Carrier mission. Players can also unlock and purchase new face masks that the main characters wear.

=== Customization ===
The game allows weapon customization, bought with money earned as the game progresses. Such elements as new barrels, stocks, forend-mounted vertical grips, and extra-large magazines and ammo drums that can be swapped out to give the weapon a unique look and superior statistics. Other modifications include suppressors, a gun-shield, an underslung grenade launcher, or an underslung 12-gauge shotgun.

A firing range feature was proposed that would allow the player to test out their newly customized weapon; however, it was removed as it did not meet the developers' standards.

=== Vehicles ===
The original game boasted three different drivable vehicles: a jeep, a main battle tank, and a hovercraft. Gameplay was designed so that one player would drive and the other would fire a secondary weapon like a ring-mounted XM312 heavy machine gun (jeep and hovercraft) or a 120 mm cannon (the tank). The jeep and tank were removed from the final product due to "pacing issues" and the hovercraft was used only in the China and Miami levels.

=== Online multiplayer ===
Multiplayer (or "Versus" mode) allows up to four players, with two on each team (similar to the co-op structure of the main campaign). Both teams will compete over objectives on the map such as assassinating a VIP or destroying an objective in order to earn the most money for their side. At the same time, they will also be forced to deal with the opposing team in order to secure their objectives. On August 11, 2011, The Army of Two online servers were shut down by EA, due to lack of players.

Multiplayer for the game was region-locked. Players with the European, American or Asian version of the game could not play with each other.

There are three multiplayer game types: Warzone, Bounties, and Extraction.

- In Warzone, the primary and secondary objectives are randomly generated and they may vary greatly. One team might need to get to a certain place and defend it, while the other team tries to destroy it, shoot down the chopper, blow up a jeep with its gunner, transport wounded soldiers to the extraction point, assassinate V.I.P's, etc.
- Bounty has the player hunt down the leader of the hostile forces on the map in exchange for a sum of money.
- In Extraction the objective is to rescue randomly spawned V.I.P.s or P.O.W.s to a safe location.

Also, every map contains cases of intelligence documents that the player can seek out for extra cash.

Character customization is not possible in the multiplayer portion of the game but the player can buy preset sets of weapons, upgrade the characters body armor and the amount of ammo he can carry. Players need to be careful while shopping though since the team with the most cash in the end wins.

== Plot ==
In 1993, Army Rangers Elliot Salem and Tyson Rios are tasked to work with Phillip Clyde, a private military contractor for the Security & Strategy Corporation (SSC), to assassinate Somali warlord Abdullahi Mo'Alim. Following the successful mission, Clyde invites Salem and Rios' commander, Lieutenant Colonel Richard Dalton, to join the company. He agrees, bringing along Salem and Rios, and the three enter the private sector and are given Alice Murray for a handler.

In 2001, Salem and Rios are sent to Afghanistan to kill terrorist Mohammed Al-Habiib who has recently seized a missile facility with Soviet missiles. After they find and destroy the missiles, the two find themselves in an area filled with noxious gas; Salem comments on how poorly they are equipped for missions, and Rios suspects a conspiracy. Nevertheless, they successfully kill Mohammed and destroy the missile stockpiles.

Two years later, Salem and Rios are sent to Iraq, where they are to rescue Lieutenant Colonel Samuel Eisenhower, whose base has been besieged by terrorist leader, Ali Youssef. They reach Eisenhower and get him to safety, but as he escapes on a helicopter, it suddenly explodes mid-air, killing him, and Youssef claims responsibility. Rios suspects a conspiracy behind Eisenhower's death, thinking he was singled out, though Salem dismisses his suspicions. Just before entering Youssef's oil facility, Rios asks hacker' "Section 8" (spelled "S3kshun8" in the game), to investigate the ambushes and try to find their source, before he and Salem manage to reach Youssef and kill him.

A U.S. Navy aircraft carrier is then seized by the Abu Sayyaf terrorist organization, and Salem and Rios are tasked by SSC to retake the aircraft carrier with Clyde. As they clear the ship, Salem and Rios soon stumble upon Clyde and a terrorist discussing something. Clyde flees when he sees them, but Rios manages to retrieve his USB flash drive. He sends the information on the drive to Section 8, who then tells Rios that Clyde has been leaking U.S. troop positions to the terrorists. Salem and Rios then encounter the ship's captain, and learn that the nuclear bomb-laden ship is on a collision course for the city of Manila. The captain sacrifices himself to detonate the explosives as Salem and Rios escape on a lifeboat. Afterwards, they decide to quit the company.

While on a mission for their arms dealer Cha Min-Soo in South Korea, they inadvertently make contact with Alice and decide to pull off one last mission. They are told to execute Cebu Mohammed, the leader of Abu Sayyaf, by detonating a bridge as his vehicle crosses. Though they complete their objective, they find themselves under attack by the Chinese Military and wanted for murder; as it turns out, the vehicles that they destroyed were Chinese military. Salem and Rios then discover that U.S. Senator Richard Whitehorse, who was campaigning against a bill that would allow privatization of the army, was the one crossing the bridge. They assume that they were set up by SSC's CEO, Ernest Stockwell, and decide to go public with the evidence they gathered from Clyde; the SSC had planned to give the Army a bad image in order to get more jobs. Before they can do so however, Alice is kidnapped, and they head to Miami on Cha Min-Soo's cargo plane to save her and confront Stockwell.

U.S. Air Force air defenses detect an aircraft that Cha Min-Soo gave to the duo and send up two F-15 fighter jets to investigate. As Salem and Rios notice the fighters, they also find that Clyde has snuck aboard the plane and murdered their pilot, whom they promised Cha Min-Soo to look after. They engage him but are interrupted when the fighters shoot down the plane due to unresponsiveness and the sight of gunfire exiting the rear of the plane. Salem and Rios survive the crash and assume Clyde to be dead. They then enter the Miami airport, where they are forced to engage SSC Operatives. Meanwhile, Cha Min-Soo radios them, furious about his plane and the pilot; the two tell him it was Clyde's fault, and Cha Min-Soo offers to pay them to kill him and his personal guards, though he's unaware of the plane crash. Upon being, Alice reveals to them that Dalton is the real mastermind of the plot, and that he plans to kill Stockwell in order to bolster his political and military career. Alice tells them that they need to save Stockwell, as he is the only one who can clear their names. Salem and Rios assault the SSC headquarters to gather evidence against Dalton, but they once again encounter Clyde, who also managed to survive the crash. As they fight, Salem manages to kick Clyde out of a window to his presumed death. They then head to the roof where Dalton is attempting to escape in a helicopter, but Rios uses a Stinger missile to destroy the helicopter and kill Dalton.

In the epilogue, Stockwell is revealed on a televised news report to have turned himself in and served 3 months in jail. Salem and Rios call Alice and tell her that they have started their own PMC - Trans World Operations (T.W.O.) - and invite her to join them.

== Downloadable content ==
This game received two downloadable packs in 2008:

=== SSC Challenge Map Pack ===
The downloadable content (DLC) SSC Challenge Map Pack became available for download on April 24. It added a new cooperative 2vs2 online multiplayer mode and four maps for it.

=== Veteran Map Pack ===
The downloadable content (DLC) Veteran Map Pack became available for download on May 29. It contains a new co-op campaign map (fighting and eliminating a dangerous Russian militia group based in Kyiv's subway system), an expanded Versus map (China Canal Lock), a more dynamic and interactive environment, more destructible objects, and 6 new "secret" achievements. There's also an alternative ending to the game in which the players can take on Dalton in a more dramatic boss battle at SSC's Miami headquarters in which Salem and Rios have to lock him in a vault.

The online component for both add-ons was disabled when the servers were shut down, and the add-ons were delisted in 2017.

== Reception ==
Reception

Aggregate score
Aggregator	Score	
Aggregator	PS3	Xbox 360
Metacritic	74/100	72/100

Review scores
Publication	Score	
Publication	PS3	Xbox 360
Destructoid	N/A	4.5/10
Eurogamer	N/A	7/10
Famitsu	32/40	32/40 (X360) 31/40
Game Informer	7.5/10	7.5/10
GameDaily	8/10	8/10
GameRevolution	B	B
GameSpot	6.5/10	6.5/10
GameSpy	3.5/5	3.5/5
GameTrailers	7.3/10	7.3/10
GameZone	8/10	8/10
Giant Bomb	3/5	3/5
IGN	7.9/10	(US) 7.9/10 (AU) 6.1/10
Official Xbox Magazine (US)	N/A	5.5/10
PlayStation: The Official Magazine	3.5/5	N/A
Wired	6/10	6/10

Army of Two received "mixed or average reviews" on both platforms according to the review aggregation website Metacritic. In Japan, where the game was ported for release on March 19, 2008, Famitsu gave it a score of 32 out of 40, while Famitsu X360 gave the Xbox 360 version a score of two sevens, one nine, and one eight.

GamePro gave the Xbox 360 version a score of four out of five, saying, "If you're playing alone, or looking for a competitive online rampage, Army of Two teeters between middling fun and frustration, but if you take the time to give the meaty co-op component its due you'll find yourself sucked in by one of the few gun-obsessed romps worth playing through again and again." However, Edge gave the same console version a score of four out of ten, calling it a "relatively straightforward thirdperson shooter, focused on large-scale skirmishes and the dynamics of a two-man team. It's serviceable enough in some regards."

=== Sales ===
At release, the game sold 831,000 units in the US in March 2008, selling 606,100 units for the Xbox 360 and 224,900 units for the PlayStation 3.

== Other media ==
=== Graphic novel and comics ===
Army of Two: Dirty Money, written by John Ney Rieber and illustrated by Brandon McKinney, is a 2008 graphic novel which follows Rios and Salem through some of their earliest missions together working as private military contractors. The plot follows the corruption of the private military company that they work for. Rios and Salem work together as an 'Army of Two', trying to stay alive and uncover the conspiracy within the company that employs them. A six-issue miniseries called Army of Two: Across the Border was also released and the events of this story take place between the first and second game.

=== Film ===
In 2008, there was a report that Universal Pictures had picked up film rights to the game, citing Universal's desire to "fast-track the project to begin production in 2009", hiring Scott Z. Burns to write the script. Nothing came of it and the project was cancelled.

== Sequels ==
=== The 40th Day ===
A sequel, Army of Two: The 40th Day, was released for PlayStation 3, PlayStation Portable and Xbox 360 in 2010.

=== The Devil's Cartel ===
The third installment, Army of Two: The Devil's Cartel, is set in the same universe as the previous games, but focuses on two new TWO (Tactical Worldwide Operations) operatives, Alpha and Bravo, as the two playable characters. The game's campaign mode is set in Mexico during a drug war. It featured split-screen and online co-op modes, like the previous games. The Devil's Cartel uses the Frostbite 2 engine and was released in March 2013 on the Xbox 360 and PlayStation 3.
