= Army of Two: The 40th Day =

2010 video game

- Developers: EA Montreal; Buzz Monkey (PSP)
- Publisher: Electronic Arts
- Director: Alex Hutchinson
- Designer: Danny Bélanger
- Programmer: Daniel Goupil
- Artists: Marco Beauchemin; Philippe Ducharme
- Writers: Alex Hutchinson; Matt Turner
- Composer: Tyler Bates
- Series: Army of Two
- Engine: Unreal Engine 3
- Platforms: PlayStation 3 Xbox 360; PlayStation Portable
- Release: NA: January 12, 2010; AU: January 14, 2010; EU: January 15, 2010
- Genre: Third-person shooter
- Modes: Single-player, multiplayer

Army of Two: The 40th Day is a 2010 third-person shooter video game developed by EA Montreal and published by Electronic Arts for PlayStation 3 and Xbox 360. The game was also released for PlayStation Portable, which was developed by Buzz Monkey. It is the sequel to Army of Two.

The 40th Day focuses on two-player cooperative play and employs a cover system. It features Tyson Rios and Elliot Salem, the two protagonists from the original game, as combatant partners who, with the assistance of their handler Alice Murray, must fight to survive and prevail over invading forces that have engulfed Shanghai, China in a devastating terrorist attack.

A sequel, entitled Army of Two: The Devil's Cartel, was released in 2013.

== Gameplay ==
Weapons and upgrades are available, with interchangeable upgrades between weapons such as adding the barrel of one assault rifle to another. The "pimped" option returns along with new camouflage schemes. Weapons can now also be obtained from dead enemies, increasing the player's arsenal to four weapons, along with grenades. Bullets will be able to penetrate weaker materials such as wood and sheet metal. Certain weapons and weapon lockers can only be unlocked by morality moments. Weapon parts can be obtained in the game for free, either by searching armored boxes (which are locked as soon as the enemy guarding it detects the player's presence), rescuing hostages, or simply exploring.

New Heavy enemy types appear as bosses. They wear thick armor and often require a special method of attack to defeat, such as shooting gas canisters or grenade bags that they carry. The Heavy enemies carry weapons such as a flamethrower and a Gatling gun that cannot be unlocked by the player, though they can be picked up and temporarily used after the Heavy is defeated.

=== Co-op playbook ===
The 40th Day expands on and refines the cooperative play featured in the original game. Players can use co-op moves at any time. The playbook allows players to scan enemies prior to engaging them in order to set up particular team-based tactics. For example, players can mock surrender or set up simultaneous sniper shots. This is in addition to using aggro as a mechanic for tactically engaging enemies in the midst of combat.

=== Aggro ===
Aggro is a system that allows two players to tactically control the target of their enemy's attacks and possibly change the outcome of a firefight. Aggro is measured by a HUD element that displays which player the enemy characters are currently focusing on. By performing aggressive actions, such as firing one's weapon at enemies, a player generates aggro and in turn causes enemies to focus more of their attention on that player, and less attention on the player with less aggro. While one player has aggro, the other is usually being ignored and as a result, can then freely perform actions such as flanking or sniping. In The 40th Day, additional non-aggressive actions can affect aggro. For example, by performing a mock surrender the enemy combatants will focus all of their attention on the player that is surrendering, allowing the other to perform a surprise attack. Some non-aggressive acts can be performed cooperatively as well.

=== Morality moments ===
An example of how a Morality cutscene is in play. Here, Rios and Salem are confronted by a security guard (unseen) before they can choose to take out or return assault rifles from a rifle rack.

In The 40th Day players are forced to make moral decisions that affect the story of the game. At pre-determined points in the game, players will be presented with a choice. For example, whether they should steal weapons from a mall security armory or vacate the premises. The decision is not a vote between two players, but instead either player must decide while the other player is forced to accept the ramifications of that decisions regardless of what their preference was. The outcome and presentation of these morality moments takes the form of comic panels created by the popular artists Chris Bachalo, Jamie Mendoza and Jock.

=== Multiplayer ===
Multiplayer in The 40th Day includes region-free play, client-server connections, and an increased number of participants.

The 40th Day maintains its focus on cooperative gameplay by requiring that players play in a partnership. Partners are a source for ammunition and are able to revive their fallen teammate. There are four multiplayer game modes:

- Co-op Deathmatch pits teams of two against other partnerships.
- Control awards points to teams for capturing and defending randomly spawned points.
- Warzone has players battle over various objectives.
- Extraction is a game mode where teams of four fight waves of increasingly powerful enemies in order to clear the map for extraction.

== Downloadable content ==
A DLC titled Chapters of Deceit was released on Xbox Live and PlayStation Network on April 1, 2010. It features two new campaign levels: "The Assassination" and "Collateral Damage", which attempt to bridge the plot gap between Mission 004: The Hospital and 005: The Mall.

== Plot ==
After establishing Trans World Operations (TWO), private military contractors Tyson Rios and Elliot Salem head to Shanghai, where they are tasked with meeting their contact, JB. He leads the two to a back alley to collect their gear and weapons before proceeding to plant locator beacons throughout strategic locations in Shanghai. After planting the last of the beacons and an encounter with overzealous security guards, they regroup on a rooftop of a building.

Handler Alice Murray radios in and tells them they will get extra cash for terminating JB; Rios and Salem can either choose to kill him or lie to Alice about his escape. Following JB's fate, Shanghai comes under attack by terrorists, ravaging the city. Rios and Salem barely escape the building and encounter the 40th Day Initiative mercenaries attempting to kill them. They manage to contact Alice, who informs them that she is alive but trapped in the South African Consulate. They head for the consulate, dispatching groups of mercenaries as well as encountering civilian hostages, whom they either rescue or leave behind. Inside the consulate, Rios and Salem discover Alice being held hostage in an office. After freeing her, the three fight their way to the main hall, where a crashed helicopter allows them to escape into the underground tunnels.

Rios and Salem pass through the tunnels and a highway, rescuing hostages and fighting through the mercenaries. They manage to make their way to the Shanghai Zoo where they encounter more mercenaries and are guided by the zoo employees.

After leaving the zoo, Rios and Salem are contacted by Alice, who has managed to reach a safe area and instructs them to locate a communications tower to signal for help. Rios and Salem fight through rooftops to reach the communication tower, but they only find an empty room. They decide to continue searching and jump to an adjacent balcony, but it suddenly gives way, and Salem plummets down to the ground and is knocked unconscious. Salem awakens 24 hours later in a hospital, where they are met by Dr. Wu, who asks for their help in evacuating the patients. Rios and Salem defend the hospital from the mercenaries before heading to a nearby mall.

The pair are held captive at the mall until freed by a mercenary named Breznev, who then instructs Rios and Salem to plant bombs to disrupt the mercenaries' communication center. The two successfully plant the bombs and go their separate ways from Breznev. After exiting the mall, Alice contacts the pair that she has a helicopter en route to extract them. Despite their efforts in destroying the defending anti-aircraft guns, the extraction chopper is shot down and destroyed, and Alice is presumed dead.

As Rios and Salem bunker down to rest, they realize that they will not be able to escape and instead decide to exact revenge on the 40th Day Initiative by killing their leader, Jonah Wade. They manage to track him to a heavily fortified temple, and the pair fight through it until they reach the inner sanctum, finally meeting Jonah. Jonah then justifies his actions as a violent social experiment to force the world to turn back from the moral decay that is destroying it while holding a device that he claims is the trigger for a nuclear bomb located deep in the city.

He offers Rios and Salem a choice to make an "Act of Sacrifice" by having one shoot the other or choose to kill him and his invading force, which will detonate the bomb and kill seven million people. Regardless of choice taken, Jonah reveals that the bomb was a hoax. Killing one's partner ends the game with an epilogue where the surviving partner laments taking his friend's life, while killing Jonah ends the game with an epilogue of him reflecting on his motivations as UN forces begin to move into the city.

== Weaponry and equipment ==
=== Weapon customization ===
A predominant feature is the ability to customize weapons using money that is earned through killing enemies and completing tasks. The official Army of Two blog described it as "like Lego with Guns […] every part of your weapon is customizable and interchangeable with parts from other weapons". The changes to weapons are not only for appearance but also affect the performance and the amount of aggro that they generate. Some weapon characteristics that can be changed are handling, accuracy, ammunition capacity, aggro, and power.

=== Weapon design contest ===
A community-oriented weapons design contest was run for The 40th Day. The contest challenged fans and enthusiasts from North America, Italy, France, and the UK to submit an image and brief description of a weapon that they designed. Two weapon designs (one from the North American and one from the European entries) were chosen as winners and will appear in the game for those players who have a saved game present on their game console from the original Army of Two.

The winning entries were chosen on August 6, 2009. The winning entries were the AS-KR1 "The Ass Kicker" Rifle (submitted by Angry Joe show) and the "Grand Pinger" Sniper Launcher (submitted by Uberblargh).

== Reception ==
Reception

Aggregate score
Aggregator	Score		
Aggregator	PS3	PSP	Xbox 360
Metacritic	74/100	49/100	73/100

Review scores
Publication	Score		
Publication	PS3	PSP	Xbox 360
1Up.com	B	D	B
The A.V. Club	N/A	N/A	C+
Destructoid	7/10	N/A	N/A
Eurogamer	N/A	N/A	7/10
Famitsu	31/40	26/40	(X360) 33/40; 31/40
Game Informer	6.5/10	N/A	6.5/10
GameRevolution	B−	N/A	B−
GameSpot	7.5/10	N/A	7.5/10
GameSpy	3/5	N/A	3/5
GameTrailers	N/A	N/A	7.7/10
Giant Bomb	3/5	N/A	3/5
IGN	8.5/10	5/10	8.5/10
Official Xbox Magazine (US)	N/A	N/A	8/10
PlayStation: The Official Magazine	4.5/5	2/5	N/A
411Mania	N/A	N/A	7.5/10
Teletext GameCentral	N/A	N/A	6/10

The PlayStation 3 and Xbox 360 versions received "mixed or average reviews", while the PSP version received "generally unfavorable reviews", according to the review aggregation website Metacritic. In Japan, where the console versions were ported for release on March 25, 2010, followed by the PSP version on June 24, 2010, Famitsu gave it a score of three eights and one seven for the former, and 26 out of 40 for the latter, while Famitsu X360 gave the Xbox 360 version a score of two eights, one nine, and one eight for a total of 33 out of 40.

IGN said of the console versions: "The morality moments could have posed larger dilemmas and the AI still stumbles at times, but overall, The 40th Day is a great game to blast through." While Hardcore Gamer criticized the game's minor improvements and similarity to the original, it noted that "The 40th Day is more serious, lacking in the "what the hell" moments that peppered the first game."

Edge gave the Xbox 360 version a score of seven out of ten, saying, "As adequate an expression of the genre as it is, it somehow can't quite conjure those high notes of enthusiasm - akin to the way in which a whiteboard diagram of demographics and key features fails to inspire heart palpitations." The Daily Telegraph gave the same console version seven out of ten, calling it "An all out co-op shooter that does exactly what it says on the tin. What it sets out to achieve it succeeds with style, even if these ambitions are firmly rooted in B-movie territory. Whilst this stunted ambition and some minor gameplay niggles hold it back from being truly great, this is a full throttle, adrenalin fuelled, macho-fest which is dumb, fun and full of guns." Andrew Hayward and Mitchell Dyer of GamePro gave the same console version three stars out of five, with Hayward saying, "while The 40th Day has its moments, it just isn't consistent enough to keep my attention." However, Matt Cabral later gave the PSP version two-and-a-half stars, saying, "There is some mindless, bullet-whizzing fun and a few neat set pieces in this portable take. And, at its best, The 40th Day does recall the arcade action of classic quarter-munchers such as Commando and Contra. But for the most part the technical and visual achievements that make this title tick on consoles are all but absent here, leaving PSP players with a broken bro-mance." Dakota Grabowski of GameZone gave the PlayStation 3 and Xbox 360 versions six out of ten, saying, "Although it was mostly a bore, the combat was 'stupid' enough for two players to take pleasure from watching the train-wreck."

Chad Sapieha of Common Sense Media gave the game four stars out of five, calling it "a fun, witty, Hollywood-style action adventure that outdoes its predecessor in almost every way." Joe Roche of 411Mania gave the Xbox 360 version 7.5 out of 10, saying, "There are some other aspects of the game that might be appealing to some – the customization from the original title is back in full force this time around, right down to the ability to upload your own personalized face masks to the EA server to upload into your game. I'll admit that being able to throw a soda can silencer and a kitchen knife bayonet onto my zebra pattern AK-47 was enjoyable." However, David Jenkins of Teletext GameCentral gave the same console version six out of ten, saying, "The original was obnoxious and insensitive but this new shooter lacks even that much personality."

The 40th Day sold over 246,500 units during its first month of release in the US.

== Sequel ==
A sequel, Army of Two: The Devil's Cartel, was released in 2013 on the Xbox 360 and PlayStation 3.
