= Far Cry 4 =

2014 video game

- Cover art featuring antagonist Pagan Min
- Developer: Ubisoft Montreal (Note: Additional work by Ubisoft Toronto, Red Storm Entertainment, Ubisoft Shanghai, and Ubisoft Kyiv.)
- Publisher: Ubisoft
- Directors: Alex Hutchinson; Patrik Méthé
- Producer: Cedric Decelle
- Programmer: Cedric Decelle
- Artists: Jean-Alexis Doyon; Liam Wong
- Writers: Mark Thompson; Li Kuo; Lucien Soulban
- Composer: Cliff Martinez
- Series: Far Cry
- Engine: Dunia 2
- Platforms: PlayStation 3; PlayStation 4; Windows; Xbox 360; Xbox One
- Release: November 18, 2014
- Genre: First-person shooter
- Modes: Single-player, multiplayer

Far Cry 4 is a 2014 first-person shooter game developed by Ubisoft Montreal and published by Ubisoft. It is the successor to the 2012 video game Far Cry 3, and the fourth main installment in the Far Cry series. Set in the fictional Himalayan country of Kyrat, the game follows Ajay Ghale, a young Kyrati-American, who becomes caught in a civil war between Kyrat's Royal Army, controlled by the tyrannical king Pagan Min, and a rebel movement called the Golden Path. The gameplay focuses on combat and open world exploration; players battle enemy soldiers and dangerous wildlife using a wide array of weapons. The game features many elements found in role-playing games, such as a branching storyline and side quests. The game also features a map editor and both cooperative and competitive multiplayer modes.

Announced in May 2014, development on Far Cry 4 began immediately after the shipment of Assassin's Creed III in late 2012. The team originally intended to develop a direct sequel to Far Cry 3 that continues the narrative, but the idea was later scrapped and the team decided to develop a new setting and story for the game. Certain aspects of Far Cry 4 were inspired by the Nepalese Civil War, and the design of the game's antagonist Pagan Min was inspired by Japanese films Ichi the Killer and Brother. Troy Baker was hired to portray Pagan Min. The game's competitive multiplayer was created by Red Storm Entertainment while the Shangri-La segments in the campaign were handled by Ubisoft Toronto.

Far Cry 4 was released worldwide for PlayStation 3, PlayStation 4, Windows, Xbox 360, and Xbox One in November 2014. It received mostly positive reviews, with critics praising the open-world design, visuals, soundtrack, and characters as well as new gameplay additions and the wealth of content. However, some reviewers disliked the story and found the game too similar to its predecessor. The game sold over 10 million units by March 2020. Several releases of downloadable content were subsequently published. A spin-off title, Far Cry Primal, was released in February 2016. A successor, Far Cry 5, was released in March 2018.

== Gameplay ==
Far Cry 4 is a first-person action-adventure game. Players assume control of Ajay Ghale, a Kyrati-American who is on a quest to spread his deceased mother's ashes in the fictional country of Kyrat. Ajay may utilize various short and long-range firearms, including pistols, revolvers, shotguns, assault rifles, submachine guns, bows, a flamethrower, rocket launchers, grenade launchers, and sniper rifles. More powerful versions of these weapons become available after considerable progress through the game. Throwable weapons include fragmentation grenades, Molotov cocktails, and throwing knives. The game allows players to take cover to avoid gunfights and to perform melee takedowns from above or up-close. Unlike previous installments in the series, Far Cry 4 gives players the ability to kick objects and the ability to hide the corpses of enemies.

In Far Cry 4, players have the ability to ride on elephants.

Players can use a variety of methods to approach missions. For instance, players can utilize stealth to evade enemies and complete objectives without being noticed, or they also have the option to assault enemies with firearms and vehicles. The player character is equipped with a digital camera, which allows him to mark and highlight all visible enemies, animals, and loot. Players are also able to ride on elephants, which serve as tank-like offensive weapons. Players can throw bait towards enemies, which attracts nearby wildlife that is hostile to both the player and enemies. Players can also hunt and skin animals.

The game features an open world environment that is free for players to explore. It features several environments, including forests, rivers, and mountains. To allow players to travel between places faster, the game features various vehicles, including buggies, trucks, and water vehicles like speedboats. Players can drive and shoot at the same time and can enable auto-drive, in which the game's artificial intelligence takes over the role of controlling the vehicle and guides players to their objectives. Players can also hijack other vehicles while driving. The "Buzzer", a small autogyro, is introduced in the game, allowing players to gain a tactical advantage from the air. Parachutes, wingsuits, and grappling hooks are also featured in the game; these items help players swing across cliffs and quickly navigate the environment. Parts of the game take place in Shangri-La, a mystical dreamland where players battle demons as the Kyrati warrior Kalinag. While in Shangri-La, players are accompanied by an injured tiger which serves as their companion. Players can issue commands to the tiger, which assists them in battle.

The game world is divided into two halves: North and South Kyrat. Players start in South Kyrat and are free to explore it almost immediately, but can only unlock North Kyrat over the course of the story. The map is progressively opened by liberating bell towers, freeing them from Pagan Min's influence and allowing the Golden Path to expand. These towers help players reveal new areas and mark new locations of interest on the map. The world is scattered with outposts controlled by Pagan Min, which can be infiltrated by players. Four larger outposts, or fortresses, can also be found, and feature stronger defenses and more difficult combinations of enemies. If players successfully liberate these outposts, they will serve as fast-travel points, allowing quick navigation through the game's world. Additional missions and quests also become available. There are many side-missions that can be completed, including hostage rescues, bomb disposal quests, and hunting missions. The collected animals' parts can then be used for crafting new pouches and belts.

Like its predecessors, the game features some role-playing elements. Players can earn experience points by completing missions and defeating enemies, and these experience points can then be spent on performance boosts and upgrades. There are two sets of abilities for players to choose from, called The Tiger and The Elephant. The Tiger upgrades mainly improve players' offensive abilities, while The Elephant upgrades improve players' defensive skills. A variety of random events and hostile encounters take place throughout the game; for example, the player may unexpectedly be attacked by an eagle, be hit by a car, or witness an animal attack. Players can accumulate karma by performing kind actions towards the rebels, such as by assisting them in battles when they are attacked by wildlife or enemies. Doing so will give players discounts when purchasing new items at trading posts, and will allow players to call in support and back-up from members of the Golden Path. Players can also gain experience by collecting items like masks, propaganda posters, and prayer wheels. There is also an Arena mode, in which players battle human enemies and animals for additional experience points and rewards.

=== Multiplayer ===
Far Cry 4 features a co-operative multiplayer mode known as "Guns for Hire", which supports up to two players. The mode is separated from the game's campaign, and players are free to explore the game's world, defeat enemies, and infiltrate outposts with their companion. In addition to the co-operative mode, players can gain access to several competitive multiplayer modes which have an asymmetrical structure. Players play as either a Rakshasa or a Golden Path member. The Rakshasa are equipped with bows and arrows and have the ability to teleport and summon wildlife to assist them and gain transparency, while Golden Path members are equipped with guns and explosives, and have access to armored vehicles. Known as "Battles of Kyrat", players fight against each other in three modes, called Outpost, Propaganda, and Demon Mask. Far Cry 4 also contains a Map Editor that allows users to create and share custom content. Similar to that of Far Cry 3, players can create their maps by customizing landscapes, and by placing buildings, trees, wildlife, and vehicles. However, the Map Editor did not support competitive multiplayer levels at launch. Multiplayer support was added to the game on February 3, 2015.

== Plot ==
After the death of his mother Ishwari, Ajay Ghale (James A. Woods) returns to his home country of Kyrat to carry out Ishwari's final wish by returning her ashes to Lakshmana. However, his mission is interrupted when the bus he is traveling on is attacked by the Royal Army and he is greeted by Pagan Min (Troy Baker), the country's eccentric and violent king. Min apologizes, brutally kills a soldier for shooting the bus, and acts warmly toward Ajay before kidnapping him and his tour guide and taking them to a dinner party at Lieutenant Paul De Pleur's mansion. After his guide is taken to be interrogated, Ajay flees with the aid of Sabal (Naveen Andrews), a commander in the Golden Path, a rebel movement established by Ajay's father, Mohan Ghale. Ajay is not able to leave the country as the Royal Army has taken control of Kyrat's only airport and sealed the borders.

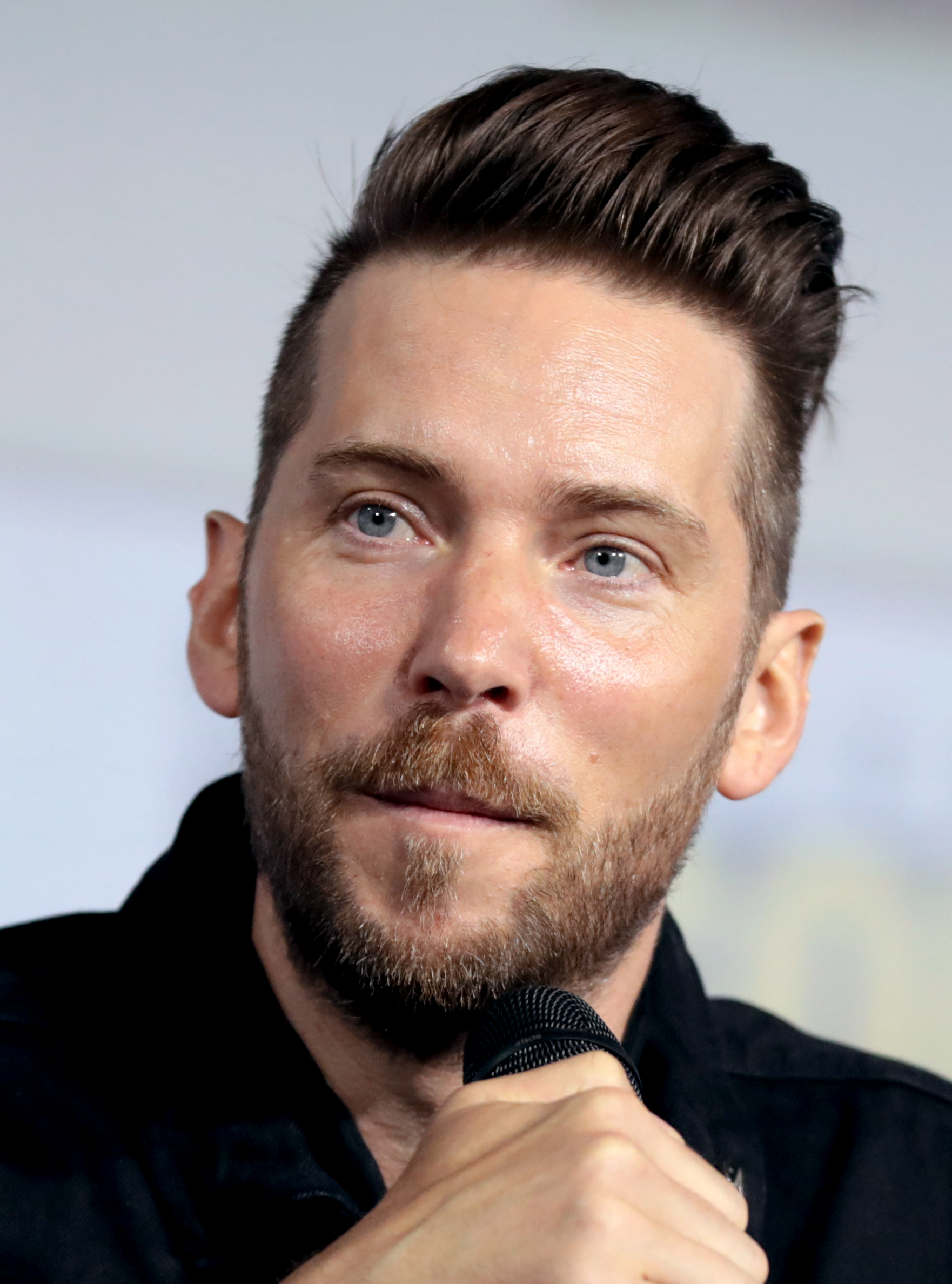
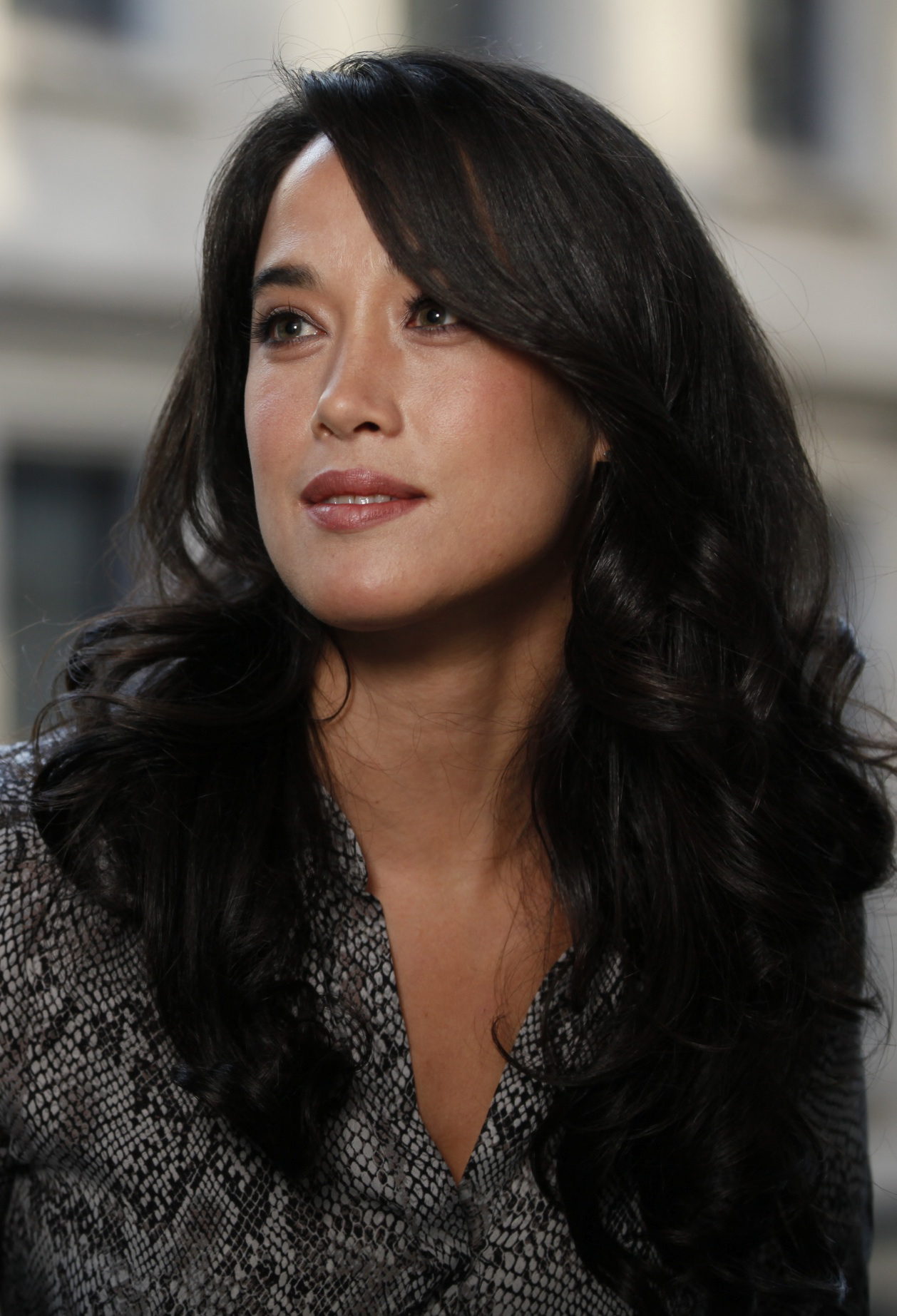
Troy Baker and Mylène Dinh-Robic voice two of the game's antagonists.

In the twenty-odd years since Ishwari and Ajay fled Kyrat, the rebellion has stagnated, with the Golden Path now fighting for their very existence. As the son of Mohan Ghale, Ajay becomes a symbol for the Golden Path to rally around. After freeing a group of hostages and liberating territory held by Pagan, the Golden Path plan on breaking Pagan's stranglehold on power by targeting his three regional governors: Paul "De Pleur" Harmon (Travis Willingham), who oversees opium production and runs Pagan's torture chambers; Noore Najjar (Mylène Dinh-Robic), who runs poaching and prostitution rings and who became a victim of Pagan's cruelty herself after he kidnapped her family; and Yuma Lau (Gwendoline Yeo), Min's adopted sister and trusted general who is obsessed with uncovering the secrets of the mystical realm of Shangri-La.

However, the Golden Path's newfound momentum is threatened by deep divisions between its commanders, Sabal, who favors traditional values, and Amita (Janina Gavankar), who argues for progress, which includes relying heavily on producing drugs for export. Ajay is forced to intervene on several occasions, with his decisions influencing the direction the Golden Path takes. The first governor to fall is De Pleur, after Noore helps Ajay find a way to infiltrate De Pleur's stronghold, allowing the rebellion to capture him. Amita and Sabal later task Ajay with confronting and killing Noore. She dies in her fighting arena, either with Ajay killing her, or with Noore committing suicide upon learning Pagan had her family executed years beforehand.

As the Golden Path secures Kyrat's southern provinces, Ajay is contacted by Willis Huntley (Alain Goulem), a CIA agent who offers intelligence for the rebels and pages from his father's diary in exchange for killing Yuma's lieutenants. After Ajay kills several of them, Huntley admits they were in fact CIA assets, and that he was sent to clean up after the CIA as the agency did not see Pagan as a threat anymore. Huntley betrays Ajay to Pagan just as the Golden Path prepares to push into Northern Kyrat.

Ajay ends up in Yuma's mountain prison, where he is drugged and suffers terrifying hallucinations, but manages to escape. In the process, he finds out that Yuma has started despising Pagan, primarily because of his affection toward Ajay's late mother. (Note: The Escape from Durgesh Prison downloadable content takes place at this point in the story.) The Golden Path pushes into the north, and while Ajay attempts to reconnect with another faction of the rebels, Pagan, aware of Yuma's plotting against him, betrays Yuma to the Golden Path. Ajay is drawn into a confrontation with her and prevails, but tensions between Sabal and Amita reach new heights, and Ajay is forced to make a final decision as to who will lead the Golden Path. Whichever leader he chooses then sends Ajay to kill the other to prevent them from starting another civil war, and Ajay can choose to either kill them as ordered or let them go. With the Golden Path now united under a single leader, Ajay joins them for an attack on Pagan's fortress and pushes on alone to Pagan's palace while the Golden Path holds off the military.

=== Endings ===
Ajay encounters Pagan, who chastises him for fleeing at the start of the game, claiming that he only ever intended to help Ajay. Pagan offers Ajay a final decision: shoot him now or listen to him. If Ajay shoots Pagan, the game ends immediately and the credits roll. If Ajay instead chooses to listen, Pagan reveals that Mohan sent Ishwari to spy on Pagan in the early days of the Golden Path, but they fell in love and had a daughter together: Lakshmana, Ajay's half-sister. Mohan killed Lakshmana for Ishwari's betrayal, and Ishwari killed him in turn before leaving the country with the infant Ajay. Pagan shows Ajay to a shrine containing Lakshmana's ashes, and Ajay places Ishwari's ashes inside. Pagan then boards a helicopter and departs peacefully, leaving the country in Ajay's hands. The player can choose to shoot down Pagan's helicopter as it flies away, killing Pagan in the process.

In the aftermath, the Golden Path seizes control of Kyrat. The final ending depends on which leader Ajay ultimately sided with. If Amita is placed in charge, she turns Kyrat into an authoritarian drug state, forcing villagers into work in factories and drug fields, and conscripting children into the group as soldiers to bolster their ranks against the remnants of the Royal Army; Ajay also learns that she has had her sister, Bhadra, taken away and is told not to bother looking for her because she’s “not coming back”. If Sabal is placed in charge, Kyrat becomes a patriarchal fundamentalist theocracy where all of Amita's supporters are executed, women are denied fundamental political rights, and Bhadra is anointed as a religious symbol for the country to rally around. The player has the choice to kill the Golden Path's leader or leave them alive.

An Easter egg ending can be found at the beginning of the game. To trigger it, Ajay must simply wait at the dinner table in Pagan's mansion; when Pagan returns, he thanks Ajay for being a "gentleman" and leads him to Lakshmana's shrine, telling Ajay of his family history. After Ajay plants his mother's ashes at the shrine, Pagan invites Ajay to join him to "finally shoot some goddamn guns".

== Development ==
The game's development was led by Ubisoft Montreal, which took over the development of the Far Cry franchise after the release of Far Cry: Instincts in 2005. Additional development was handled by four other in-house Ubisoft studios, Ubisoft Toronto, Red Storm Entertainment, Ubisoft Shanghai, and Ubisoft Kyiv. The Montreal studio worked on the game's campaign, the Toronto studio worked on the Shangri-La segments of the campaign, Red Storm handled the development of the competitive multiplayer, the Shanghai studio worked on the hunting missions, and the Kyiv studio developed the game's PC version. Development of the game began in late 2012, after the shipment of Assassin's Creed III. The game's creative director is Alex Hutchinson, who had previously worked on Maxis's Spore as well as Assassin's Creed III. The game runs on an upgraded version of the Dunia 2 engine that was used in Far Cry 3.

=== Gameplay design ===
When brainstorming ideas for the new Far Cry game, the development team originally planned on developing a direct sequel to Far Cry 3. The sequel would be set on the same tropical island, would expand upon the protagonist's story, and would bring back characters, such as Far Cry 3's secondary antagonist, Vaas Montenegro. However, after four days, the team found that a sequel was not what they wanted to achieve. As a result, they decided to scrap the idea and build a brand new game with a new setting and a new set of characters. The team adapted a "we want it all" approach, in which they hoped to experiment with all kinds of ideas. Some team members hoped that the game would allow players to fly, which led to the game's verticality. The game's director also hoped that players would be able to ride a rampaging elephant, in a place with "exotic mountainsides" and "unique culture". This led to the concept of a mountainous setting and the introduction of elephants in the game. The developers aimed for players to consider Far Cry 4 a standalone experience, and therefore they avoided bringing back any characters from Far Cry 3 except for Willis and Hurk. The decision to bring the two back was made because the team thought that they should provide some references to previous games in the series, as all of the games are set in the same universe even though they are not directly related.

Some of the gameplay elements were directly taken from Far Cry 3. Exotic locations, hunting, and the freedom for players to complete missions through different approaches were maintained in Far Cry 4. The team hoped that by incorporating and expanding upon these ideas, while introducing new features, they could make Far Cry 4 an evolution for the series. As a result, the size of the game's outposts became larger and players were given more options to customize their weapons. The team also realized that players spent a lot of time interacting with the open world of Far Cry 3, and decided to put more effort and resources into the world's design and add more quests to the game.

=== Setting and characters ===
The game's setting, Kyrat, is a fictional country in the Himalayas region. When building Kyrat, the developers merged elements from real-world regions including India, Nepal and Tibet, but exaggerated those elements. The map's size is similar to that of Far Cry 3, but is more dense, diverse, and features more varied environments. The developers hoped that players could experience a sense of exploration when traveling between different terrains. The team also hoped that the new location could be believable while remaining interesting for players. As a result, they created an identity for Kyrat by doing such things as adding different signboards to the game and creating a fictional mythology and religion for Kyrat. The game's world was also designed to accommodate new features such as the helicopter and the grappling hook. In an effort to make the world feel real, the team added improvements to the design of side-quests. Instead of simply being activities for players to complete, the quests are narrative-driven, which was done to increase the connection between them and the world. In order to increase the credibility of the game's world, the studio sent a team to Nepal to experience and record the local culture, so that they could bring those ideas back to the studio. According to the developer, the trip changed the game's design; the focus shifted from the game's civil war, which is inspired by the real-world Nepalese Civil War, to developing unique and interesting characters.

One of the game's most critically acclaimed characters is its major antagonist Pagan Min, a foreign interloper who usurps the rule of Kyrat by its royal family and names himself after the historical Burmese king within series lore. The team hoped that players would be "shocked, amazed and intrigued" by him in every encounter. Min has a complex relationship with the playable character, Ghale, as the team wanted players to guess Min's intentions and add a layer of mystery to him. The team originally hoped to have a villain that had a "punk-rock mentality", but the idea was abandoned as the team thought that the concept was not original. The pink costume Min wears throughout the game was inspired by Beat Takeshi, a character from Brother, and Kakihara, a character from Ichi the Killer. Min is designed to be sadistic yet confident, and the team hired Troy Baker to provide the voice for Min, as they thought that Baker's voice is charismatic enough to suit Min. According to Baker, Ubisoft gave him a script for the audition but he chose not to follow it, and instead decided to threaten to cut off the face of an assistant using Min's tone. The interviewer was very pleased with Baker's performance and decided to sign him for the job. As for Ghale, he was designed to be "thin", and his backstory was designed to be revealed as players progressed through the game's story. According to the game's narrative director, Mark Thompson, Ghale learns the history and culture of Kyrat along with players. The developers also hoped that Ghale could be an accessible character for players.

In hindsight, the team considered the story of Far Cry 3 "great", even though they thought that it was separated from the game's world. In order to increase players' agency and make the story feel more connected to the world for players, the team introduced a branching storyline that required players to make choices that would lead to different results and alter the game's ending. The team hoped that by adding choices, they could add additional depth and meaning to the game's campaign. Thompson added that they twisted the story of Far Cry 3 for Far Cry 4, and made outsiders the villains instead of the heroes. The team considered it a "risk", but they wanted to try something different.

The Shangri-La section features a color scheme that is different from Kyrat. It is mostly made up of gold, red, orange, white and blue.

For the Shangri-La mission, the team wanted to have a structure similar to Far Cry 3's mushroom missions; a game within a game. The Shangri-La missions are not related to Kyrat, but play an important role in the game's narrative. When creating these segments, the team put a lot of emphasis on the use of colors. They hoped that the artistic vision for Far Cry 4 would not feature any resemblance to other typical shooter games. It was originally designed to be a small open world but was later converted into a linear experience due to time constraints and huge creative differences between developers. The team later decided to simplify it, and re-imagined it into an "ancient, natural world". It is made up of five different colors. The main color of Shangri-La is gold; the developers thought that using gold as the foundation added "warmth" to the dreamland. Meanwhile, red was used heavily to add a sense of strangeness, as well as for establishing a tie to the game's narrative and story. Orange was used as a color of interaction, while white was used to add purity to the world. Blue is the last of Shangri-La's main colors and represents danger and honor.

=== Multiplayer ===
Ubisoft promised that Far Cry 4 would have much more of a multiplayer element than Far Cry 3. Some elements that were scrapped for Far Cry 3 due to time constraints were featured in Far Cry 4, such as the "Guns for Hire" co-operative multiplayer mode. Building a cooperative experience was the team's goal starting from the beginning of the game's development. Originally intended to be a separate mode, it was later made to be seamlessly integrated into the main campaign. The game's competitive multiplayer was designed to give players freedom, allowing players to progress and defeat enemies in a variety of different ways. Red Storm Entertainment also considered players' feedback from the multiplayer aspect of Far Cry 3, and decided to include vehicles in the game. The company chose an asymmetrical structure for this mode so that players could have different experiences in different matches, as well as to make matches feel more chaotic. The developers originally planned to feature female playable characters, but the plan was scrapped due to animation problems. Ubisoft announced a 'Keys to Kyrat' offer for players that owned a copy of the game for the PlayStation 3 or PlayStation 4. It allows those owners to send out game keys to up to ten other people who do not own a copy of the game. Players who are offered a key can join the person that sent them the key and play the cooperative mode for two hours.

=== Music ===
Cliff Martinez was hired to work on the game's soundtrack. A two-disc edition was released that contained 30 tracks heard in the game, and a deluxe edition was released that contained 15 extra tracks. The album was released just before the release of the game and received positive reviews. Particular praise was directed towards the usage of traditional Nepalese instruments which, combined with electronic samples, suggested high octane action and mystical wondering.

== Release ==
With Far Cry 3 being a commercial success, Ubisoft considered the Far Cry series one of their most important brands, and they hinted that a sequel was in development in June 2013. On October 3, 2013, Martinez mentioned that he was working on the soundtrack for the game. In March 2014 the game's setting and features were leaked. The game was officially announced on May 15, 2014, and the first gameplay footage was revealed during Electronic Entertainment Expo 2014. The game's cover art, which shows the light-skinned Pagan Min resting his hand on a dark-skinned person, caused controversy and accusation of racism. Hutchinson later responded and clarified by saying that Pagan Min is not a white person and that the other person depicted is not the game's protagonist. Hutchinson added that the reaction of the community regarding the cover art was "uncomfortable".

In addition to the standard version, a Limited Edition of the game is able to be purchased. This edition features additional in-game missions and an Impaler Harpoon Gun. The Limited Edition was a free upgrade for players who pre-ordered the game. A Kyrat Edition was also announced and it contains a collector's box, a poster, a journal, a map of Kyrat, a figurine of Pagan Min, and the missions from the Limited Edition. Players can also purchase a season pass for the game, which grants them access to additional content, including a new competitive multiplayer mode, a mission called "the Syringe", the missions from the Limited Edition, and the two other pieces of downloadable content. Far Cry 4: Arena Master, developed by Ludomade, was released alongside the game itself, as a companion app for the iOS and Android.

Far Cry 4 was released worldwide on November 18, 2014, for PlayStation 3, PlayStation 4, Windows, Xbox 360 and Xbox One. The PlayStation 4, Windows, and Xbox One versions feature higher visual fidelity, such as having a higher texture resolution and more animal fur. The game was supported by downloadable content upon launch. The first DLC, Escape From Durgesh Prison, featuring a new mission set during the main campaign, was released on January 13, 2015. It can be played solo or with another player. The Overrun DLC, which added new maps, a new vehicle, and a new mode to the game's competitive multiplayer, was released on February 10, 2015, for the consoles, and February 12, 2015, for PC. The Hurk Deluxe Pack was released on January 28, 2015, and added several story missions and weapons. The last downloadable content, Valley of the Yetis, features a new region and new story missions which can be played solo or co-operatively with another player. Valley of the Yetis was released on March 10, 2015, in North America and March 11, 2015, in Europe. The game was made available on Amazon Luna on November 23, 2020.

On April 29, 2025, Ubisoft released a surprise patch for Far Cry 4 which boosted the framerate to 60fps on the PlayStation 5 and Xbox Series X/S.

== Reception ==
Reception

Aggregate score
| Aggregator | Score |
|---|---|
| Metacritic | (PC) 80/100 (PS4) 85/100 (XONE) 82/100 |

Review scores
| Publication | Score |
|---|---|
| Destructoid | 9/10 |
| Electronic Gaming Monthly | 8/10 |
| Eurogamer | 8/10 |
| Game Informer | 8.75/10 |
| GameRevolution | 8/10 |
| GameSpot | 7/10 |
| GamesRadar+ | 4/5 |
| GameZone | 9.5/10 |
| IGN | 8.5/10 |
| Jeuxvideo.com | 16/20 |
| Joystiq | 4.5/5 |
| Polygon | 9/10 |
| Shacknews | 8/10 |

Far Cry 4 received "generally favorable" reviews, according to review aggregator website Metacritic.

The game's story received mixed responses. Chris Carter from Destructoid praised the personality of Ajay Ghale, which is "less in-your-face" than that of Far Cry 3's protagonist Jason Brody. He also praised the villain, Pagan Min, who he considered took the spotlight every time he appeared in the game. Nick Tan, from Game Revolution, also praised Min's personality, but he complained that the character appeared too seldom in the game. Shacknews reviewer, Steven Wong, however, thought most characters are multilayered and interesting. As the examples he gives Pagan Min's chief interrogator, Pagan Min himself, and the main character's mother. Josh Harmon from Electronic Gaming Monthly thought that the characters in this game had more depth and that the choices made by players throughout the game were meaningful. Aoife Wilson from Eurogamer thought that the game's characters were memorable, but was disappointed by the story. JeuxVideo reviewer liked neither plot nor the characters, as they wrote: "If the main plot left us a little hungry [...], it is quite sad to note that our Nemesis Pagan also disappointed us" and "The key characters of this episode are unfortunately a little too caricatured and predictable". Edwin Evans-Thirlwell, writing for GamesRadar, thought that the story grew tiresome as players progressed, even though some of its characters were interesting. He further criticized the game's writing, which he thought was lackluster. Mike Splechta from GameZone praised the game's voice acting and applauded its storyline, calling it "much more satisfying".

The game's setting received positive responses. Carter thought that the vertical nature of the game's map created obstacles for players when they were traveling between places. However, he praised the interesting lore and wildlife found within the world, as well as the game's long draw distance. Harmon had similar comments, praising the game's graphics and Kyrat's culture. Harmon thought that the hilly landscape of the game's world gave players a sense of exploration, and hence made traversal enjoyable. Wilson thought, however, that the game's setting was not as compelling as the tropical setting of Far Cry 3. Furthermore, she thought that most of the time vast territories in Far Cry 4 are similar everywhere. Nevertheless, she praised the Shangri-la section, which, according to her, was one of the exceptions. She also notes that what the game "may lack in looks", "it makes up for by being positively stuffed with things to do". Matt Bertz from Game Informer praised the game's setting, which he thought was vibrant, varied and rich. Ludwig Kietzmann from Joystiq praised the content found within the world, and thought that the world itself was absorbing and interesting. The game's use of Hindi as a primary language has been criticized for not accurately reflecting the linguistic diversity of the Himalayan region. Shacknews reviewer Steven Wong liked that as the player travels from southern to northern territories, the music and soldiers change from Indian to Chinese.

The game's design also received acclaim. Carter from Destructoid thought that the fortress and the outpost system provided players with a sense of accomplishment and success, and he considered having the freedom to use different ways to approach and complete missions one of the greatest parts of the game. In addition, Carter applauded the game's driving mechanics and the auto-drive feature, which he considered a significant improvement for the series. However he criticized the upgrade system, which he thought was directly converted from Far Cry 3 and was uninspiring. Electronic Gaming Monthly's Harmon thought that the introduction of the helicopter was dull. Mitch Dyer, from IGN, praised the game's economy system, which he thought was satisfying. He added that it gives players motivation to complete side-quests. GameSpot's reviewer calls the game's economy "excellent" and enjoys the fact that it forces you to upgrade your wallet, so it can hold more money, and to craft a bigger backpack. Justin McElroy of Polygon praised the introduction of the grappling hook and the vertical map design, which he thought had allowed players to develop a strategy before taking action. He also praised the game for allowing players to use multiple approaches toward a single objective. GameSpot's reviewer writes that after liberating an outpost and leaving it, the game may inform the player that it is already under another attack, when the player comes back to defend it and leaves again, he meets the same message that the outpost is under attack.

The game's multiplayer mode received a mixed response. Carter compared the competitive multiplayer to that of Tomb Raider, and called it "skippable". He considered the cooperative multiplayer a fun addition to the game but was disappointed by its limitations. He also added that the game would still be a strong title without these multiplayer elements. Bertz from Game Informer also found the multiplayer shallow and poorly-executed. He also criticized the lack of a large player pool and dedicated servers. Evans-Thirlwell of GamesRadar thought that the cooperative multiplayer was fun to play, but the asymmetrical competitive multiplayer was easy to forget. In contrast, GameZone's Splechta thought that the competitive multiplayer mode was "a surprise" for him. Dyer echoed a similar statement, and he thought that it had successfully captured the scale and freedom offered by both the game's co-op and campaign. JeuxVideo wrote about multiplayer in the game: "You will understand that exploring Kyrat is honestly funny for two, assuming we are not likely to get tired in the long run".

Harmon thought that Far Cry 4 was an improvement over Far Cry 3, but he thought that the game felt and played too similarly to Far Cry 3, and he added that the game was unambitious. Bertz thought that Ubisoft Montreal's vision for Far Cry 4 is not as bold as its predecessors, and also thought that the experience delivered by Far Cry 4 did not stray far away from Far Cry 3. Tan also noted that the game's open world design felt not only similar to Far Cry 3, but also other Ubisoft franchises like Assassin's Creed and Watch Dogs. Evans-Thirlwell thought that the experience offered by Far Cry 4 was hollow as it had failed to innovate or reinvent its wheel. Dyer thought that the game was not ambitious, but the experience delivered was still gratifying and rewarding.

=== Sales ===
Ubisoft expected the game to sell at least six million copies in its first year of release. Far Cry 4 became the fastest-selling game and the most successful launch in the series in the first week of release. Far Cry 4 was the second best selling game in the United Kingdom for all-formats during the week of its release, only behind Grand Theft Auto V. It was also the sixth best selling game in the US according to The NPD Group. As of December 31, 2014, the game has shipped seven million copies. The game sold more than 10 million copies during the eighth generation of video game consoles.

=== Awards ===
| Year | Award | Category | Result | Ref. |
|---|---|---|---|---|
| 2014 | Game Critics Awards Best of E3 2014 | Best Action Game | Nominated | |
| 2014 | Game Critics Awards Best of E3 2014 | Best PC Game | Nominated | |
| 2014 | Best of Gamescom 2014 | Best Console Game Sony PlayStation | Nominated | |
| 2014 | Best of Gamescom 2014 | Best Action Game | Nominated | |
| 2014 | The Game Awards 2014 | Best Shooter | Won | |
| 2014 | 17th Game Developers Choice Awards | Best Technology | Nominated | |
| 2014 | 11th British Academy Video Games Awards | Artistic Achievement | Nominated | |
| 2014 | 11th British Academy Video Games Awards | Game Design | Nominated | |
| 2014 | 11th British Academy Video Games Awards | Music | Won | |
| 2014 | 11th British Academy Video Games Awards | Performer (Troy Baker as Pagan Min) | Nominated | |
| 2014 | 11th British Academy Video Games Awards | Story | Nominated | |
| 2014 | 18th Annual D.I.C.E. Awards | Game of the Year | Nominated | |
| 2014 | 18th Annual D.I.C.E. Awards | Action Game of the Year | Nominated | |
| 2014 | 18th Annual D.I.C.E. Awards | Outstanding Achievement in Character (Pagan Min) | Nominated | |
| 2014 | 18th Annual D.I.C.E. Awards | Outstanding Achievement in Game Design | Nominated | |
| 2014 | 18th Annual D.I.C.E. Awards | Outstanding Achievement in Original Music Composition | Nominated | |
| 2014 | 18th Annual D.I.C.E. Awards | Outstanding Achievement in Sound Design | Nominated | |
| 2014 | 18th Annual D.I.C.E. Awards | Outstanding Technical Achievement | Nominated | |
| 2014 | 2014 NAVGTR awards | Game of the Year | Nominated | |
| 2014 | 2014 NAVGTR awards | Art Direction, Contemporary | Won | |
| 2014 | 2014 NAVGTR awards | Direction in a Game Cinema | Nominated | |
| 2014 | 2014 NAVGTR awards | Game Design, Franchise | Nominated | |
| 2014 | 2014 NAVGTR awards | Graphics, Technical | Nominated | |
| 2014 | 2014 NAVGTR awards | Sound Editing in a Game Cinema | Nominated | |
| 2014 | 2014 NAVGTR awards | Use of Sound, Franchise | Nominated | |
| 2014 | 2014 NAVGTR awards | Game, Franchise Action | Nominated | |
| 2014 | SXSW Gaming Awards | Excellence in Visual Achievement | Won | |
| 2014 | SXSW Gaming Awards | Excellence in SFX | Nominated | |
