= Michael Biehn filmography =

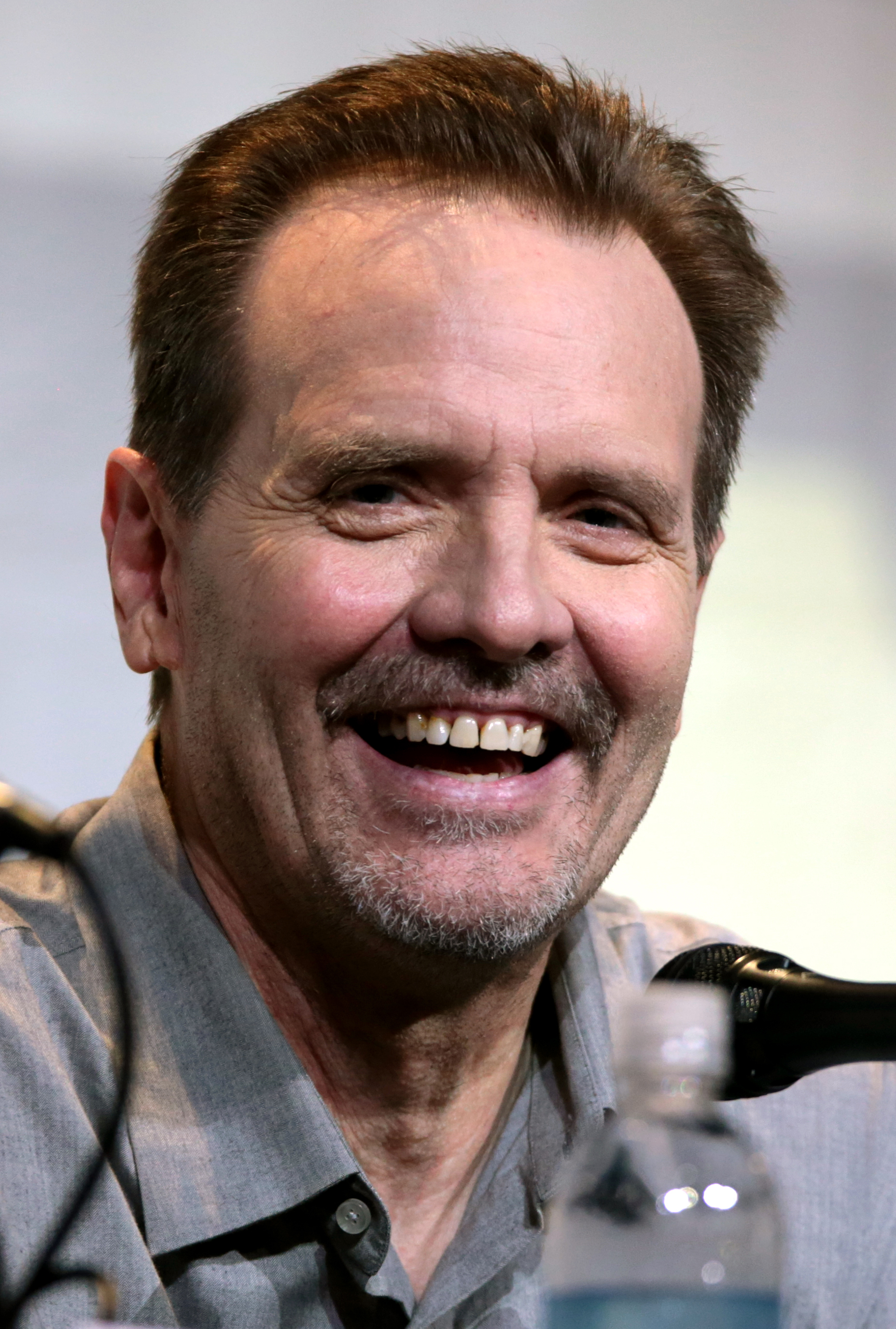
Biehn at the 2016 San Diego Comic-Con

Michael Biehn is an American actor, primarily known for his military roles in science fiction films, directed by James Cameron, as: Sgt. Kyle Reese in The Terminator (1984) and its sequel Terminator 2: Judgment Day (1991; although he only appeared in Director's cut on Terminator 2), Cpl. Dwayne Hicks in Aliens (1986), and Lt. Coffey in The Abyss (1989). His other films include The Fan (1981), Navy SEALs (1990), Tombstone (1993), The Rock (1996), Megiddo: The Omega Code 2 (2001), and Planet Terror (2007). On television, he has appeared in Hill Street Blues (1984) and Adventure Inc. (2002–2003). Biehn received a Best Actor Saturn Award nomination for Aliens, and received The Life Career Award at the 2011 ceremony.

== Film ==
Key
†	Denotes films that have not yet been released

Year	Title	Role	Notes	Ref.
1978	Coach	Jack Ripley		
1978	Grease	Mike	Uncredited	
1980	Hog Wild	Tim Warner		
1981	The Fan	Douglas Breen		
1983	The Lords of Discipline	Cadet Lieutenant Colonel John Alexander		
1984	The Terminator	Sergeant Kyle Reese		
1986	Aliens	Corporal Dwayne Hicks	Nominated—Saturn Award for Best Actor	
1987	Rampage	Anthony Fraser		
1988	The Seventh Sign	Russell Quinn		
1988	In a Shallow Grave	Garnet Montrose		
1989	The Abyss	Lieutenant Hiram Coffey		
1990	Navy SEALs	Lieutenant James Curran		
1991	Terminator 2: Judgment Day	Sergeant Kyle Reese	Featured in Special Edition and Director's Cut only	
1991	Timebomb	Eddie Kay		
1991	K2	Taylor Brooks		
1993	Deadfall	Joe Dolan		
1993	Tombstone	Johnny Ringo		
1995	In the Kingdom of the Blind, the Man with One Eye Is King	Jackie Ryan	Cameo	
1995	Jade	Detective Bob Hargrove		
1995	Breach of Trust	Casey Woods		
1996	The Rock	Commander Charles Anderson		
1996	Mojave Moon	Boyd		
1997	Dead Men Can't Dance	Robert Hart		
1997	The Ride	Smokey Banks		
1998	American Dragons	Detective Tony Luca		
1998	Susan's Plan	Bill		
1999	Cherry Falls	Sheriff Brent Marken		
2000	The Art of War	SAD Agent Robert Bly		
2001	Megiddo: The Omega Code 2	Vice President David Alexander		
2002	Clockstoppers	Henry Gates		
2005	Havoc	Stuart Lang		
2005	Dragon Squad	Petros Angelo		
2006	The Insatiable	Strickland	Direct-to-video	
2007	Spin	Tony Russo		
2007	Grindhouse – Planet Terror	Sheriff Hague		
2007	Grindhouse – Thanksgiving	Sheriff Hague	Fictitious trailer	
2007	They Wait	Blake O'Connell	Cameo	
2008	Stiletto	Lee	Direct-to-video	
2009	Saving Grace B. Jones	Landy Bretthorse		
2009	Streets of Blood	Agent Michael Brown	Direct-to-video	
2010	Psych 9	Detective Marling		
2010	The Blood Bond	John Tremayne	Also director and writer	
2010	Bereavement	Jonathan Miller		
2011	Take Me Home Tonight	Officer Bill Franklin		
2011	The Divide	Mickey		
2011	Puncture	Red		
2011	The Victim	Kyle Limato	Also director and writer	
2011	Yellow Rock	Tom Hanner		
2011	From Darkness	Agent Doug Albright	Short film	
2012	Jacob	Lawrence Kell		
2012	Sushi Girl	Mike	Cameo	
2013	Treachery	Henry		
2013	The Night Visitor	Agent Walker	Also executive producer	
2014	The Legend of DarkHorse County	Future Jon Ford		
2014	Tapped Out	Reggie Munroe		
2014	The Dark Forest	Peter		
2014	Hidden in the Woods	Oscar Crocker	Also executive producer	
2015	The Scorpion King 4: Quest for Power	King Yannick	Direct-to-video	
2016	Psychopath	Father	Also executive producer	
2016	She Rises	Daddy Longlegs	Also executive producer	
2016	The Night Visitor 2: Heather's Story	Agent Walker		
2017	The Shadow Effect	Sheriff Hodge		
2019	Red Handed	Reynolds		
2020	Killer Weekend	Dr. Carol	Also executive producer	
2024	The Lockdown	Max Hightower		
2024	Rippy	Schmitty		
2025	Predator: Killer of Killers	Vandenberg "Vandy"	Voice	
2026	Onslaught	Baylor		
TBA	The Kellys †	TBA	In Production	

== Television ==
Year	Title	Role	Notes	Ref.
1977	James at 15	Tony	Episode: "Pilot"	
1977	Logan's Run	Sandman	Episode: "Logan's Run"	
1978	Zuma Beach	J.D.	Television film	
1978	A Fire in the Sky	Tom Rearden	Television film	
1978–1979	The Runaways	Mark Johnson	Main role; 17 episodes	
1979	Family	Jake	Episode: "The Athlete"	
1979	ABC Afterschool Special	Seth	Episode: "The Terrible Secret"	
1979	Steeletown	'Gibby' Anderson, Bill's Brother	Television film	
1979	The Paradise Connection	Larry	Television film	
1983	China Rose	Daniel Allen	Television film	
1984	The Martyrdom of St. Sebastian	Sebastian	Television film	
1984	Hill Street Blues	Officer Randall Buttman	Recurring role; 3 episodes (season 5)	
1985	Deadly Intentions	Dr. Charles Raynor	Television film	
1985	Die Nacht aus Blei	Eselein	Television film	
1992	A Taste for Killing	Bo Landry	Television film	
1993	Strapped	Matthew McRae	Television film	
1994	Deep Red	Joe Keyes	Television film	
1995	Tales of the Wild	Blake / Philip Thornton	Episode: "Le sang du chasseur"	
1996	Conundrum	Detective 'Stash' Horvak	Television film	
1997	Asteroid	FEMA Director Jack Wallach	Television film	
1998–2000	The Magnificent Seven	Chris Larabee	Main role; 22 episodes	
1999	Silver Wolf	Roy McLean	Television film	
2000	Chain of Command	Secret Service Agent Craig Thornton	Television film	
2002	Borderline	Detective Macy Kobacek	Television film	
2002–2003	Adventure Inc.	Judson Cross	Main role; 22 episodes	
2004	Hawaii	Sean Harrison	Main role; 8 episodes	
2004	The Legend of Butch & Sundance	Mike Cassidy	Television film	
2006	Law & Order: Criminal Intent	Deputy Commissioner Leland Dockerty	Episode: "The War at Home"	
2009	Criminal Minds	Detective Ron Fullwood	Episode: "Cold Comfort"	
2009	Dark Blue	Lieutenant Jay Frye	Episode: "O.I.S."	
2014	24 Hour Rental	'Buzz'	Main role; 12 episodes	
2014	Métal Hurlant Chronicles	Sheriff Jones	Episode: "Whiskey in the Jar"	
2019	Curfew	'Roadkill' Jim	Episode: #1.2	
2020	The Mandalorian	Lang	Episode: "Chapter 13: The Jedi"	
2022	The Walking Dead	Ian	Episode: "Warlords"; Nominated—Saturn Award for Best Guest Starring Role on Television (2022)	
2023	Law & Order: Organized Crime	David Carver	Episode: "The Wild and the Innocent"	

== Video games ==
Year	Title	Role	Notes
1987	Metal Gear	Solid Snake	Likeness on cover art (uncredited)
1999	Command & Conquer: Tiberian Sun	GDI Commander Michael McNeil	Full-motion video cutscenes
2013	Aliens: Colonial Marines	Corporal Dwayne Hicks	Also younger likeness
2013	Far Cry 3: Blood Dragon	Sergeant Rex "Power" Colt	
2016	Trials of the Blood Dragon	Sergeant Rex "Power" Colt	

== Voice work ==
Year	Title	Role	Notes	Ref.
2019	Alien 3	Corporal Dwayne Hicks		
