= Hidden in the Woods (2012 film) =

- Film poster
- Spanish: En las afueras de la ciudad
- Directed by: Patricio Valladares
- Written by: Andrea Cavaletto; Patricio Valladares
- Produced by: Francisco Inostroza; Patricio Valladares; Rodrigo M. Cazaux; Evelyn Belmar; Luis Aguirre España
- Starring: Siboney Lo; Carolina Escobar; Daniel Antivilo; Jose Hernandez; Domingo Guzman; Daniel Candia; Cuentrejo; Serge Francois Soto; Renato Munster
- Cinematography: Tomas Smith
- Edited by: Patricio Valladares
- Music by: Rodrigo Huepe; Maximiliano Soublette
- Production company: Vallastudio Films
- Distributed by: Epic Pictures Group; Artsploitation Films, Inc.
- Release dates: August 6, 2012 (Fantasia International Film Festival); September 17, 2013
- Running time: 97 minutes
- Country: Chile
- Language: Spanish

Hidden in the Woods (Spanish: En las afueras de la ciudad) is a 2012 Chilean splatter film directed by Patricio Valladares and co-written by Andrea Cavaletto and Valladares. It features a mixed cast of relatively unknown actors and well-known Chilean comedians, including Siboney Lo, Carolina Escobar, Daniel Antivilo, José Hernandez, Domingo Guzman, Daniel Candia and Nicole Perez. An English-language remake with the same name, also directed by Valladares, was released in 2014.

== Plot ==
Ana and Anny, along with their deformed brother/son, live in the desolate southern Chilean countryside, having been sheltered from society by their drug dealer father their entire lives. One day, the police arrive to investigate, and after a violent altercation, the siblings are forced to flee. They are also pursued by their father's crazed drug kingpin boss, Uncle Costello, who believes the sisters know the location of his valuable supply. Costello sends a group of trained killers after them, but they soon discover that the siblings are more dangerous than they appear. Amidst a world of bloody executions, roadside prostitution, sexual assault, and even cannibalism, the body count rises.

== Cast ==
- Siboney Lo as Ana
- Carolina Escobar as Anny
- Daniel Antivilo as The Dad
- Serge Francois Soto as Uncle Costello
- Renato Muster as Esteban
- Domingo Guzman as Sicario 1
- Daniel Candia as Sicario 2
- "Cuentrejo" as Sicario 3
- Jose Hernandez as Manuel
- Nicole Perez as Police woman

== Festival awards ==
- Winner: Best Extreme Movie, Feratum Film Festival (Mexico)
- Winner: Best Movie, Buenos Aires Rojo Sangre Film Festival
- Winner: Best Movie, Asti Film Festival (Italy)

== Selected festivals ==
- 2012 Fantasia Film Festival
- 2012 London FrightFest Film Festival
- 2012 Celluloid Scream Film Festival
- 2012 Serbian Fantastic Film Festival
- 2012 Festival de Cine de la Habana
- 2012 Feratum Film Festival
- 2012 Buenos Aires Rojo Sangre
- 2013 San Diego Latino Film Festival
- 2013 HorrorHound Weekend
- 2013 Weekend of Fear Festival

== Release ==
The film premiered on 6 August 2012 at Fantasia Film Festival and was on 23 to 27 August 2012 at the London FrightFest Film Festival. The movie was distributed by Epic Pictures Group.

== Remake ==
An American remake of the film was directed by Valladares and produced by Michael Biehn (who also starred), Jennifer Blanc and Loris Curci. It was filmed in Houston, Texas during 2013. The remake was released on VOD on December 2, 2016.

== Soundtrack ==
The song "Bloodspill" by Daniel Perrson is featured over the ending credits.
