= Powerglove (disambiguation) =

Power Glove is a Nintendo Entertainment System controller.

Powerglove may also refer to:

- Powerglove (band), an American metal band
- Power Glove (band), an Australian electronic music duo
