= Patricio Valladares =

- Born: 17 July 1982 (age 43); Chillán, Chile
- Occupations: Film director, Screenwriter, Producer, Editor
- Years active: 2010–present
- Awards: 2017 Regional Culture Awards

Patricio Valladares (born 17 July 1982, in Chillán, Chile) is a Chilean film director, screenwriter and comic book writer, best known for his work in horror films, who mixes elements of both arthouse and grindhouse, with an emphasis on modern extreme violence, action and some gore. He is also involved in comics and short movies, and frequently injects black humor or homages to grindhouse movies, along with artistic cinematography, somewhat intellectual dialogue and the occasional surrealism. His serial killers tend to make repeat appearances in his movies.

== Directing career ==
Known for his work in genre cinema Valladares has directed numerous features throughout the years. In 2011, he directed the En las Afueras de la Ciudad (also known as Hidden in the Woods), based a true story. Based a true story, the film made its world appearance at Fantasia Film Festival before touring the globe with appearances at FrightFest Film Festival and among others. Epic Pictures Group is currently handling sales and distribution. This film caught the attention actor Michael Biehn who would later produce the English language remake through his production company. WT Films is handling worldwide sales, with the pic set for a release in 2016 in numerous territories. The English-language remake of the film

In 2014, Valladares directed Toro Loco: Bloodthirsty a.k.a. Toro Loco: Sangriento, starring by Francisco Melo, Mauricio Pesutic, Simón Pesutic and Constanza Piccoli, dark comedy flick shot entirely in Spanish. The world premiere was held at Mórbido Fest in Mexico. Event Film is the sales agent. In 2015 he shot three features in English, all of which are currently in postproduction. These are: Downhill (shot in Chile), an experimental horror/thriller. WT Films serves as worldwide sales agent. Has been pick up bye WTFilms as Sales Agent and Co producer. The Ghosts of Garip, part horror, part found footage shot in location in Istanbul, Turkey. Moonrise Pictures is the sales agent.

Lastly, he directed Nightworld in Bulgaria with Nightmare On Elm Street star, Robert Englund. These three features were produced by Loris Curci and written by Barry Keating.

== Filmography ==
=== Director / writer ===
- 2023: Invoking Yell
- 2022: Hidden in the Woods Part 2
- 2020: Embryo
- 2016: Nightworld
- 2016: The Ghosts of Garip
- 2016: Downhill
- 2015: Toro Loco: Bloodthirsty
- 2014: Hidden in the Woods (American remake)
- 2012: Hidden in the Woods (Original version)
- 2011: Toro loco (Original version)
- 2009: Dirty Love
- 2007: Curriculum

== Festival awards ==
- Winner: Best Overall, Sickest Flick and Best Director. (TLA Cult Awards) 2014
- Winner: Best Extreme Movie, Feratum Film Festival (Mexico) (2012)
- Winner: Best Movie, Buenos Aires Rojo Sangre Film Festival (Argentina) (2012)
- Winner: Best Movie, Asti Film Festival (Italy) (2012)
- Winner: Best Director, Weekend of Horrors (USA) (2013)
- Winner: Best Director, Buenos Aires Rojo Sangre Film Festival (Argentina) (2015)
- Winner: Downhill- Working Progress, Blood Window Ventana Sur (Argentina) (2015)

== Awards and recognitions ==
- 2011 Fondart Award for the audiovisual project Hidden in the Woods
- 2011 GORE BIO BIO Award for the audiovisual project Hidden in the Woods
- 2016 CORFO Award for the audiovisual project Suspense
- 2017 CORFO Award for the audiovisual project Embryo
- 2017 Regional Culture Awards

== Film festivals ==
- 2009 Sitges Film Festival (Dirty Love)
- 2012 Fantasia Festival (World Premiere)
- 2012 London FrightFest Film Festival (Europe Premiere)
- 2012 Celluloid Scream Film Festival
- 2012 Serbian Fantastic Film Festiva
- 2012 Tohorror Film Fest
- 2012 Asti Film Festival
- 2012 Festival de Cine de la Habana
- 2012 Feratum Film Festival
- 2012 Buenos Aires Rojo Sangre
- 2013 San Diego Latino Film Festival
- 2013 HorrorHound Weekend
- 2013 Weekend of Fear Festival
- 2013 Blood Window, Ventana Sur.
- 2014 Film Festival flix (Artsploitation series)
- 2014 Beyond the Window, Blood Window at Ventana Sur
- 2015 Morbido Film Festival
- 2015 Buenos Aires Rojo Sangre
- 2015 Blood Window at Ventana Sur
- 2016 Sitges Film Festival (Downhill & Hidden in the Woods, Midnight X-Treme)
- 2016 Neuchâtel International Fantastic Film Festival
- 2016 London FrightFest Film Festival
- 2016 Morbido Film Fest
- 2016 Molins Horror Film Festival
- 2016 Sanfic
- 2016 Mar del Plata Film Festival
- 2016 H.P. Lovecraft Film Festival
- 2017 Moscow International Film Festival
- 2017 London FrightFest Film Festival
- 2017 Morbido Film Fest
- 2020 London FrightFest Film Festival Halloween
- 2020 Molins Horror Film Festival
- 2021 Sanfic
- 2021 Portland Horror Film Festival

== See also ==
- Cinema of Chile
