= Far Cry 3: Blood Dragon =

2013 video game

- Key art by James White
- Developer: Ubisoft Montreal
- Publisher: Ubisoft
- Directors: Dean Evans; Alexandre Letendre
- Producer: Fabrice Cuny
- Designer: Kevin Guillemette
- Programmer: Raphaël Parent
- Artist: Olivier Nicolas
- Writer: Lucien Soulban
- Composer: Power Glove
- Series: Far Cry
- Engine: Dunia 2
- Platforms: PlayStation 3; Windows; Xbox 360; PlayStation 4; Xbox One; Google Stadia; Nintendo Switch 2
- Release: PlayStation 3; 30 April 2013; Windows, Xbox 360; 1 May 2013; Classic Edition; PS4, Windows, Xbox One; 16 December 2021; Stadia; 7 July 2022; Nintendo Switch 2 WW: Spring 2027
- Genre: First-person shooter
- Mode: Single-player

Far Cry 3: Blood Dragon is a 2013 first-person shooter game developed by Ubisoft Montreal and published by Ubisoft. It is a standalone expansion to Far Cry 3 and the seventh overall installment in the Far Cry franchise. Blood Dragon is a retro-futuristic parody of 1980s action films, cartoons and video games, and takes place on an open world island. Players assume the role of military cyborg Sergeant Rex "Power" Colt. Gameplay is largely similar to Far Cry 3, though several systems from the base game were simplified or removed, and it introduces the titular Blood Dragon, a massive reptile that fires lasers from its eyes and can be lured to attack enemy garrisons.

The game's development was completed in about six months. It was part of Ubisoft's initiative to release downloadable content that would appeal to newcomers to the series, and the team was tasked to create something unexpected as Far Cry 3 downloadable content. The game was inspired by movies from the 1980s such as The Wraith and Terminator, and recent movies like Manborg and Hobo with a Shotgun. The director for Hobo with a Shotgun, Jason Eisener, became the game's informal advisor after befriending the game's director, Dean Evans. Michael Biehn, who played Sgt. Kyle Reese in the Terminator franchise, was invited to provide his voice for the game's protagonist, while Australian synthwave duo Power Glove composed the game's soundtrack.

Far Cry 3: Blood Dragon was released for PlayStation 3 on 30 April 2013, and for Windows and Xbox 360 on 1 May 2013. The game received generally positive reviews upon release, and was praised for its gameplay, soundtrack and its 1980s influence, but opinions were divided on the game's attempts at humour. The game was a commercial success for Ubisoft, as it sold 1 million copies by August 2013. A remastered version of the game was released in December 2021, available for players who purchased the Far Cry 6 season pass. While the game did not have a sequel, a spin-off, Trials of the Blood Dragon, was released in 2016. An adult animated series loosely inspired by Blood Dragon, titled Captain Laserhawk: A Blood Dragon Remix, released on Netflix in October 2023.

== Gameplay ==
In this gameplay screenshot, protagonist Rex "Power" Colt is attacking the titular blood dragon.

Blood Dragon is a standalone expansion to Far Cry 3, which is a first-person shooter video game. In the game, the player controls Rex "Power" Colt, a cyborg military commando stranded on an unnamed island. Like the main game, it allows players to use various means to approach their objectives; for instance, players can use various firearms such as pistols, assault rifles, shotgun, and sniper rifles, and explosives like grenades to kill their opponents. Alternatively, they can utilize stealth tactics such as distracting enemies by throwing a die, or performing silent takedowns with a large knife. Enemies can also be tagged using Rex's bionic eye. The game features a simplified character progression system. With sufficient cyberpoints (the game's equivalent of experience), new skills and combat perks, such as increased health or increased defense, are automatically unlocked. At the beginning of the game, most of the skills unlocked by the end of Far Cry 3, such as swimming for an indefinite duration underwater and chained combat takedowns, are already unlocked. The crafting system featured in Far Cry 3 was removed in Blood Dragon.

The island is an open world that is about half the size of Far Cry 3. Players can hunt wildlife, complete side missions to unlock new weapon upgrades and attachments, and liberate enemy outposts and garrisons. The unnamed island is the home of the blood dragons, as well as various wildlife such as cybersharks and mutant cassowaries. Blood dragons are blind, but they can shoot lasers from their eyes and hunt using their sense of smell. Players can throw cybernetic hearts to lure blood dragons to an enemy base, which would help Rex to wipe out nearby enemies. The only way to collect cybernetic hearts is to rip them from the corpses of fallen enemies. Blood dragons are infused with the lights of neon, and the color the neon lights reflect their hostility status. Red means that the beast is already attacking, yellow suggests that the beast is being cautious, while green means that they are calm. The game features 13 hostile garrisons that the players can liberate. Hostile enemies will call for reinforcements and activate the alarms if they detect the presence of Rex in their compound. These bases have an energy shield that must be deactivated before a blood dragon can enter the compound. Once liberated, these outposts became fast travel points for the players, though they can also freely explore the world on foot or by various vehicles. As the player explores the world, they will find various collectibles in the form of VHS tapes and CRT TVs.

== Plot ==
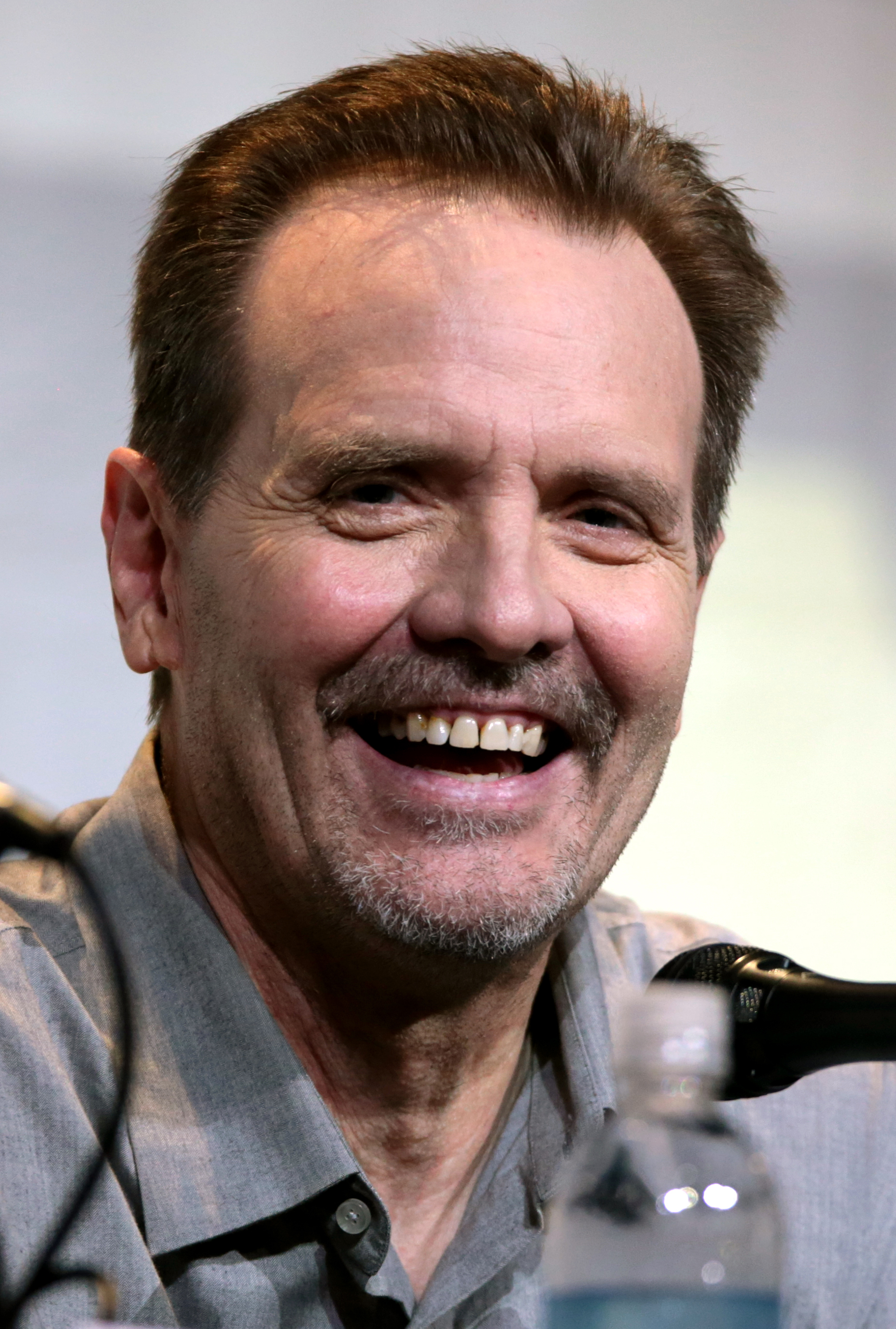
Michael Biehn provided his voice for protagonist Rex "Power" Colt.

Far Cry 3: Blood Dragon is set in a dystopian version of 2007 where the world is suffering the aftermath of a nuclear war. Ubisoft described the game as "an 80s VHS vision of the future" where the player must "get the girl, kill the bad guys, and save the world".

The player controls an American cybernetic super-soldier named Sergeant Rex "Power" Colt (Michael Biehn). He and another American cyber-soldier, T.T. "Spider" Brown (Phil LaMarr), travel to an unnamed island to investigate Colonel Sloan (Danny Blanco Hall), an elite agent who has gone rogue. Rex and Spider confront Sloan, who knocks Rex out and kills Spider.

Rex is awoken by Sloan's assistant Dr. Elizabeth Darling (Grey DeLisle), who, disillusioned with Sloan's goals, betrays him. He teams up with Darling to overthrow Sloan's plan to revert the world to a prehistoric-like state with his rockets, armed with the blood of the "blood dragons" that roam the island. After liberating bases, saving scientists, and killing animals, Rex fights Sloan's other assistant, Dr. Carlyle (Robin Atkin Downes), who has used the blood of blood dragons to turn humans into zombie-like creatures called "the running dead". After he fights Dr. Carlyle's cyber soldiers and blood dragons, Dr. Carlyle is killed by his own AI, who had been mistreated and acted out of revenge.

Rex goes into a parallel dimension where he fights legions of Colonel Sloan's running dead. Upon defeating them, he gets the Killstar, an arm-mounted laser gun that allows him to defeat Sloan at the cost of his own vitality. After Rex and Darling have sex, she is abducted the following morning. Rex makes an assault on Sloan's base with the Killstar and the Battle Armored Dragon Assault Strike System (B.A.D.A.S.S.).

Rex confronts Sloan who, having programmed Rex, prevents him from attacking. Darling and Spider's memories remind Rex of his humanity, and he impales Sloan with his robotic hand and fires the Killstar, killing him. Darling appears and informs Rex of his success in stopping Sloan's plans, then proceeds to destroy the base. They embrace while looking on at the destruction, as Darling looks behind with purple eyes and a sinister gaze.

== Development ==
Far Cry 3: Blood Dragon is a standalone expansion for Far Cry 3, which was released in late 2012. At the time, Ubisoft was experimenting with a new approach to release downloadable content (DLC) for their games. The company sought to appeal to new and existing players. It first experimented with The Tyranny of King Washington, a DLC for Assassin's Creed III that is set in an alternate timeline. The team intended to continue this approach for Far Cry 3, and allowed the developers to abandon its characters and the settings. Ubisoft welcomed all types of idea for the DLC, and they were approached by Dean Evans, who had previously worked on Assassin's Creed III and Tom Clancy's Splinter Cell: Conviction, about a game that is set in "a 1980s vision of the future". Franchise director Dan Hay and Ubisoft executives in Paris were pleased with the idea, and gave Evans approximately six months to complete its development.

The game was heavily inspired by B-movies released in the 1980s and the early 1990s. Since Hay gave the team free rein to create something unexpected, Evans used the opportunity to "resurrect a VHS-era aesthetic he felt was lost to the times". At the time, the release of nostalgic films such as Manborg and Hobo with a Shotgun made him believe that Blood Dragon would yield similar success, since the genre was underrepresented in the video game industry. Evans contacted director Jason Eisener after watching Hobo with a Shotgun; the two soon became friends, and Eisener became Blood Dragon's informal adviser, with Evans regularly sending assets and soundtracks to him. Ubisoft also invited Eisener to visit their Montreal office to brainstorm additional ideas and read the game's script. Initially, the team planned to include a boss battle in Blood Dragon, which would involve Rex fighting "the Plague", characters from Hobo with a Shotgun. The idea was scrapped due to the game's limited development time.

Initially, Ubisoft considered hiring Dolph Lundgren for the lead role, Rex "Power" Colt, but Evans met Michael Biehn, who was known for his roles as Kyle Reese and Dwayne Hicks, during a Q&A session for The Victim, and decided that he would be the perfect candidate to voice Rex. Evans contacted Jennifer Blanc to set up a meeting, but he was initially reluctant to meet with Evans due to his unpleasant experience voicing Hicks in Aliens: Colonial Marines, his only voice role for a video game. Biehn changed his mind after meeting Evans, as he found the 1980s influence to be inherently interesting. The team described Rex Colt as "Michael Biehn in Terminator - but if he was the Terminator". Biehn portrayed Rex as "somebody that was old and done [wiping out blood dragons] 100 times". Evans added that Rex was "bored" and "cynical" about the events happening in the game. As a result, the team had Biehn record satirical one-liners with a hoarse voice.

To ensure that the game captured the aesthetics of the 1980s movie, Evans held weekly "Cyborg Nights", where the development team gathered together to watch films such as RoboCop, Predator, and The Wraith. The cutscenes featured in the game are slideshow-styled 16-bit animations. Evans also asked the team to design the characters as if they only have a budget of $150. Many characters in the game looked like action figures, and the team incorporated found objects into their design that is commonly seen in "B-movie sci-fi". According to Evans, the team was proud of the script, which was "bad", and boasted about having "predictable and one-dimensional characters", "terrible story" and "minimal emotions" during early preview events. He further remarked that Blood Dragon did not "make much sense", and that the game was designed to be "ridiculous", "fun", "stupid" and "honest". The team hoped that the game could evoke the feeling of playing with action figures when players were young.

Since the game had a very short development cycle, many systems, such as skill trees and crafting, were either removed or streamlined significantly. Evans said the essence of the game is entirely about "running around with very big guns and shooting cyborgs in their faces whilst trying to avoid dragons that fire lasers from their eyes". Most of the enemy designs were simple, but creating the blood dragons was challenging for the team due to their massive size; the developers had to rethink the island's design to ensure that the dragons can fully interact with the environment without clipping into the terrain. Many features were cut from the game since the team became over-ambitious: one deleted ending involved Rex eating Sloan's heart before transforming into a giant to battle a massive dragon, and a boss fight with Sloan was replaced with cutscenes. At one point the game included self-aware quick-time events, such as "press A to show emotions" and "press A to cry", but this was subsequently removed from the game.

Australian synthwave duo Power Glove composed the game's music. Evans asked Eisener, who worked with the duo previously on Hobo with a Shotgun, to help him reach them. The soundtracks were produced fairly early during the game's development, as Evans wanted to use them as a baseline for the game's development. According to Evans, this allowed the team to understand more about the atmosphere and the tone the game was striving for. Concept arts were sent to Power Glove for inspiration. The team first composed the Blood Dragon theme, the theme for Rex Colt, and "Omega Force". The production of the soundtrack went smoothly, as the team rarely needed to ask the duo to revise their soundtracks. The soundtracks produced were mainly electronic music that paid homage to John Carpenter and Terminator films. To capture the retro vibe, the team also recruited the sound designer of Airwolf to serve as the game's audio director. As with Far Cry 3, the game is powered by the Dunia 2 engine.

=== Release ===
In March 2013, Far Cry 3: Blood Dragon was found listed on a Brazilian ratings site. On 1 April 2013, Ubisoft released a teaser video and website for Far Cry 3: Blood Dragon, leading many to believe that it was an April Fools' Day joke. Suspicions that the game was real were further confirmed when Power Glove uploaded music from the soundtrack to SoundCloud. The game was leaked on 7 April 2013, due to an exploit in Ubisoft's digital distribution service, Uplay, which led a temporary closure until the exploit was fixed. According to Ian Miles Cheong, "The hackers developed a piece of software which tricks the Uplay executable into believing that the user has ownership over games that they do not own." On 8 April 2013, the game was listed on the Xbox Live Marketplace.

On 11 April, Ubisoft officially confirmed the game's release with a new trailer, and that the game would be released on PlayStation Network on 30 April, and on Windows and Xbox Live Arcade, on 1 May. The trailer was animated in a 1980s style, including all the tropes of poor voice acting and imperfections designed to make the video look like a VHS tape. A live-action video titled Blood Dragon: The Cyber War was released on 16 April 2013. The virtual box art cover for the game was designed by James White, who had previously created artwork for the film Drive.

A remastered version of Blood Dragon was included in the season pass for Far Cry 6. The remastered version, titled Classic Edition, was released on 16 December 2021 for PlayStation 4, Windows, and Xbox One, and launched for Google Stadia on 7 July 2022.

In January 2026 Ubisoft released a patch for Far Cry 3: Blood Dragon which boosted the framerate to 60fps on the PlayStation 5 and Xbox Series X/S for the PlayStation 4 and Xbox One versions of the game.

== Reception ==
Reception

Aggregate score
Aggregator	Score
Metacritic	(PC) 81/100 (PS3) 82/100 (X360) 80/100

Review scores
Publication	Score
Destructoid	7/10
Eurogamer	9/10
Game Informer	8.5/10
GameSpot	8.5/10
GamesRadar+	4/5
IGN	8/10
Joystiq	4.5/5
PC Gamer (UK)	81/100
Polygon	8/10

Far Cry 3: Blood Dragon received "generally favorable" reviews, according to Metacritic upon release. The game received a nomination for Downloadable Game of the Year at the 17th Annual D.I.C.E. Awards, and won the VGX award for Best DLC. The game sold over 500,000 copies in two months, which surpassed Ubisoft's expectations, and its success also boosted the sales of Far Cry 3. At Gamescom 2013, the game was announced to have sold over 1 million copies.

The tone and the theme of the game received mixed reviews. According to GameSpot's Kevin VanOrd, Blood Dragon is "fascinatingly entertaining", its writing more clever than most other shooters in the market and that it was "hard not to be charmed from the moment it begins". Mitch Dyer from IGN liked the 80s influence and described the experience as entering the mind of a nine-year-old kid where action figures come to life. Sinan Kubba from Joystiq compared Rex Colt to Duke Nukem, and lauded Ubisoft for successfully "combin[ing] crazy ideas with classy writing", a feat that the original game failed to achieve. Dan Whitehead from Eurogamer agreed that the game was dumb, adding that it "wears its idiocy like a shield", but remarked that some players may not enjoy this kind of humor. Matt Bertz from Game Informer thought that the story was hilarious, but commented that the crass humor featured in the game, similar to the 1980s movie, may alienate some of its players. James Stephanie Sterling from Destructoid and Alex Wiltshire from PC Gamer were more critical of the game's humor; Sterling thought that some of the jokes were banal and lame. The game's soundtracks received critical acclaim. The cutscenes were generally liked; VanOrd compared them to older games such as Metal Gear and Shadow of the Beast, though Dyer noted that some of these cutscenes were too long.

The gameplay received generally positive reviews. Most critics liked the blood dragons, as their presence gave players an additional way to clear outposts and garrisons. They found the blood dragons' interaction with other enemies to be an engaging experience. However, several critics remarked that it was not too challenging to kill a blood dragon in the game. Wiltshire added that they were not interesting to fight, and were more interesting as an ally than an enemy. Whitehead praised the game's progression and pacing, noting that the game ends before it overstays its welcome. Bertz disliked some of the side objectives for disrupting the game's pacing, and thought that some of the quests were repetitive and boring. VanOrd and Dyer liked how most of the skills in Far Cry 3 were already unlocked at the beginning of Blood Dragon, with Dyer noting that this made Rex a very powerful character. Many critics remarked that the gameplay strengths of Far Cry 3 remain in Blood Dragon. While several critics were disappointed by the lack of new gameplay additions, Arthur Gies from Polygon thought that Blood Dragon was a more manageable game due to its smaller size and simplified systems.

== Legacy ==
Evans initially planned for a sequel, though Far Cry 4 director Alex Hutchinson later added that the game would not have a follow-up. Although no sequels to Blood Dragon have been released, a Trials game titled Trials of the Blood Dragon was developed by RedLynx and released by Ubisoft in 2016. Evans left Ubisoft in March 2018 after his project was cancelled internally. Following the success of Blood Dragon, Ubisoft continued to release spin-offs for the series using assets built for mainline games, which led to the release of Far Cry Primal in 2016 and Far Cry New Dawn in 2019. Blood dragons return as enemies in Dead Living Zombies, the final DLC pack for Far Cry 5.

In 2019, it was announced that Ubisoft was collaborating with Adi Shankar to develop an animated series inspired by the game, titled Captain Laserhawk: A Blood Dragon Remix. The show was released on Netflix on 19 October 2023.
