= The Divide (2011 film) =

2011 American horror film

- Theatrical release poster
- Directed by: Xavier Gens
- Written by: Karl Mueller; Eron Sheean
- Produced by: Ross M. Dinerstein; Darryn Welch; Nathaniel Rollo
- Starring: Lauren German; Michael Biehn; Milo Ventimiglia; Courtney B. Vance; Iván González; Michael Eklund; Abbey Thickson; Ashton Holmes; Rosanna Arquette
- Cinematography: Laurent Barès
- Edited by: Carlo Rizzo
- Music by: Jean-Pierre Taïeb
- Production companies: Instinctive Film; Flame Ventures; Eleven Eleven Films; Preferred Content; Julijette; BR Group; Ink Connection
- Distributed by: Anchor Bay Films (United States)
- Release dates: March 13, 2011 (SXSW); January 13, 2012 (United States)
- Running time: 122 minutes
- Countries: Canada; Germany; United States
- Language: English
- Budget: $3 million
- Box office: $145,676

The Divide is a 2011 American apocalyptic science fiction horror film directed by Xavier Gens and written by Karl Mueller and Eron Sheean. The film stars Lauren German, Michael Biehn, Milo Ventimiglia, and Rosanna Arquette. The Divide premiered at the South by Southwest Film Festival on March 13, 2011, and Anchor Bay Films released it in the United States on January 13, 2012.

== Plot ==
As nuclear explosions ravage New York City, residents of an apartment block rush downstairs to escape from the building, only to be forced into the basement by further explosions. Only eight of the residents – Eva and her boyfriend Sam, Josh and his brother Adrien, Josh's friend Bobby, Marilyn and her daughter Wendi, and Delvin – manage to force their way into the building's bomb shelter before the superintendent, Mickey, seals the door. The group acclimates to the cramped surroundings while Mickey asserts his dominance over the shelter and its denizens, much to the chagrin of Josh, Bobby, and Delvin. After some time, the shelter's door is broken open and the shelter is invaded by armed soldiers in biohazard suits; the men's speech is unintelligible and their allegiance remains ambiguous. The men attack the group and seize Wendi, leaving the shelter with her. Delvin and Mickey manage to kill three of the men and Mickey takes a rifle. Josh volunteers to use one of the dead soldiers' suits to leave the shelter and search for Wendi.

Outside of the shelter, Josh finds the area entirely sealed off by plastic sheet tunnels connected to a laboratory. Josh's outfit allows him to explore the lab, where he discovers several unconscious children, including Wendi, in stasis units, their hair shaved off and their eyes bandaged. One of the soldiers checks the ID on Josh's suit and, realizing he is an imposter, tears out his breathing apparatus, exposing Josh to the air. Josh flees back to the shelter, killing two of the soldiers on the way. After Josh returns, the soldiers weld the door shut from the outside, trapping everyone within. Time passes; Josh begins to suffer the effects of the radiation and admits to Adrien that he only went outside to find rescue for Adrien and himself. Eva, in a fractured relationship with the meek Sam, grows closer to Adrien. Bobby volunteers to hack up the bodies of the dead soldiers so their decaying remains can be thrown into the toilet's septic tank. Delvin grows suspicious that Mickey is hoarding resources. Marilyn, having been told by Josh that Wendi is dead, enters into a sexual relationship with Bobby.

Marilyn attempts to convince Eva to sleep with Josh, warning her that the men will want sex. The group grows increasingly angry with Mickey as resources grow scarce, culminating when Delvin discovers Mickey's locked safe room and threatens to taser him if he does not open it. A struggle ensues and Mickey shoots Delvin in the head with the rifle. The group does not believe Mickey's argument of self-defense, and an increasingly ill Josh, and an increasingly deranged Bobby, torture him to gain the code to the safe room. Eva throws the rifle down the toilet to stop Josh using it. Seizing authority, Josh and Bobby are physically and emotionally abusive to Marilyn. Josh makes it clear that he wants Eva, and Sam is unable to stand up for her. Eva and Sam try to protect Marilyn from Josh and Bobby, but are unable to. While Eva is tasked with watching Mickey, Mickey reveals that there is a gun hidden in his safe room.

Josh and Bobby force Eva to hack up Delvin's corpse when Sam cannot, leaving Eva distraught. Josh and Bobby, both losing their hair to radiation sickness, shave their heads. Mickey informs Eva that there is another way out of the shelter, through the septic tank to the sewer. Eva tries to retrieve the gun, but cannot get past the pair. She finds Marilyn's corpse, the two having beaten her to death. Eva notices her hair is falling out and realizes she is also sick; the shelter is not protecting them from the outside because of the broken door. Eva sends Sam to retrieve the gun while she cuts the power to distract Bobby and lures Josh away with the promise of sex. Josh grows suspicious and tries to rape Eva, but she fights him off with help from Adrien. Sam retrieves the gun, but as Bobby, Josh, Eva, and Adrien yell instructions at him to give the gun to them, Sam shoots and kills Adrien, perhaps as a result of jealousy over Eva's affections for Adrien. Josh brutally beats Sam. Bobby turns on Josh and is about to shoot him when Eva cuts his throat with a tin can lid. Eva frees Mickey, who shoots Josh. As his final act, Josh smashes an oil lamp, setting himself alight and causing a fire in the shelter. While Sam and Mickey attempt to put out the blaze, Eva chooses to escape. Eva recovers the biohazard suit and locks herself into the safe room, leaving Mickey and Sam trapped inside the burning shelter.

Breaking through the toilet into the septic tank below, Eva drops into the tank and finds a ladder to the street. She emerges into the remains of the city and stares blankly at the total devastation. This ending is open to a variety of interpretations.

== Cast ==
- Lauren German as Eva
- Michael Biehn as Mickey
- Milo Ventimiglia as Josh
- Courtney B. Vance as Delvin
- Ashton Holmes as Adrien
- Rosanna Arquette as Marilyn
- Iván González as Sam
- Michael Eklund as Bobby
- Abbey Thickson as Wendi
- Jennifer Blanc as Liz

== Production ==
The film is based on a script by the screenwriting duo of Karl Mueller and Eron Sheean. Director Xavier Gens cast Lauren German, Milo Ventimiglia, Michael Biehn and Rosanna Arquette in leading roles for the film. The film was shot in the Millennium Centre and the Manitoba Production Centre in Winnipeg, Manitoba.

== Release ==
The Divide was released theatrically by Content Films. After its premiere at Austin's South by Southwest Film Festival, the U.S. rights were quickly picked up by Anchor Bay.

== Reception ==
As of May 2023, the film has a 26% approval rating at Rotten Tomatoes and an average rating of 4.4/10 based on 58 reviews. Nigel Floyd of Time Out wrote, "Its nihilism feels cynical rather than authentically bleak, and the increasingly histrionic scenes start to resemble an indulgent actors' workshop that has spun out of control." David DeWitt of The New York Times wrote that the film is well-made and has good performances, but it "fails miserably" because the only reason to continue watching it is to see how depraved the characters become.

== Soundtrack ==
The score was composed by guitarist and music producer Jean-Pierre Taieb.
