= Toro Loco Sangriento =

Toro Loco: Sangriento
- Theatrical release poster
- Directed by: Patricio Valladares
- Written by: Patricio Valladares; Andrea Cavaletto
- Produced by: Cristóbal Braun Mesples; Patricio Valladares; George Von Knorring; Cristián Yáñez Barbieri; Francisco Melo
- Starring: Francisco Melo; Simon Pesutic; Constanza Piccoli; Cuentrejo; Gonzalo Vivanco; Daniel Antivilo; Ignacio Muñoz; Serge Francois Soto; Mauricio Pesutic
- Cinematography: Patricio Valladares
- Edited by: Sebastian Sabelle; Patricio Valladares
- Music by: Rocco
- Production companies: Too Much Films; Cbra Films; Vallastudio Pictures
- Distributed by: Event Film Distribution
- Release date: May 30, 2015
- Running time: 96 minutes
- Country: Chile
- Language: Spanish

Toro Loco: Sangriento a.k.a. Toro Loco: Bloodthirsty is a 2015 Chilean black comedy action film directed and co-written by Patricio Valladares. It features a mixed cast of relatively well-known Chilean actors, including Francisco Melo, Constanza Piccoli, Simon Pesutic, Mauricio Pesutic, Cuentrejo.

== Plot ==
A homeless man wanders the land in search of revenge for the murder of his son. This man is a legend, a hitman known as Toro Loco. He soon finds himself trapped in a city drowning in chaos, its people firmly in the grasp of a ruthless drug-peddling kingpin. With a clenched fist and his trademark six-shooter, Toro Loco must battle his way to the top, facing off against an army of tough guys to exact his revenge.

== Cast ==
- Francisco Melo as Toro Loco
- Constanza Piccoli as Siboney
- Simon Pesutic as Jano
- Serge Francois Soto as Uncle Daddy
- Cuentrejo as Cuentrejo
- Matias Lopez as Danilo Porrasito
- Gonzalo Vivanco as Domingo
- Daniel Antivilo as Viejito Pastero
- Mauricio Pesutic as Baldemar
- Francisco "Chapu" Puelles as Toro Loco's Son
- Ignacio Muñoz as Lady Caca

== Production ==
The filming began on July 24, 2014, in Chile, and ended in mid-August.

== Festival awards ==
- Winner: Best Director, Buenos Aires Rojo Sangre Film Festival (Argentina)
- Winner: Best Actor, Buenos Aires Rojo Sangre Film Festival (Argentina)

== Selected festivals ==
- 2015 Morbido Film Festival (Mexico)
- 2015 Buenos Aires Rojo Sangre (Argentina)

== Reception ==
Arsploitation Films has announced from Berlin (EFM) it has closed an all-rights North American deal for Chilean genre specialist Patricio Valladares’ action-comedy.
