= Nightworld (film) =

2017 Bulgarian psychological horror thriller directed by Patricio Valladares

- Directed by: Patricio Valladares
- Screenplay by: Barry Keating; Milan Konjevic
- Story by: Loris Curci
- Produced by: Loris Curci; Magarditch Halvadjian; Silvester Yordanov
- Starring: Jason London; Robert Englund; Gianni Capaldi; Diana Lyubenova
- Cinematography: Pau Mirabet
- Edited by: Luis de la Madrid
- Music by: Luc Suarez
- Production companies: Global Group; Open Frames
- Distributed by: Gravitas Ventures
- Release date: October 20, 2017
- Country: Bulgaria
- Language: English

Nightworld is a Bulgarian psychological horror thriller directed by Patricio Valladares and starring Robert Englund and Jason London. It is the first feature film produced by Open Frames, a subsidiary of Global Group.

== Plot ==
After he is forced to kill a teenager in self-defense, former LAPD police officer Brett Irlam retires to Bulgaria. There, he meets Ana and marries her. Her suicide sends him into a depression that worries his friend Alex, who suggests he take a security job in Sofia. Brett agrees when recurring nightmares of Ana's death keep him from moving on. The job is at a historic building well-known by the locals. Its manager, Martin, reveals a few details before hiring Brett. The job has only one major responsibility: watching CCTV footage of cameras in a locked warehouse. Martin explains that nobody has ever reported activity, but Brett must contact help immediately if he sees anything.

The job is initially tranquil. Though he occasionally hears strange noises, Brett is more worried about his nightmares, which he sometimes has trouble distinguishing from reality. Brett meets local café worker Zara, who is surprised the building needs security. One day, Brett glimpses a shadow in the footage and calls the number given to him. A blind man, Jacob, arrives at the building, explaining that he was once a watchman there, too. Jacob has Brett describe the incident thoroughly, then promises to alert Martin himself. When Martin arrives the next day he is satisfied that the situation is under control and refuses Brett's suggestion that they investigate the warehouse.

Brett and Zara grow closer. He invites her to see the building when she expresses interest, and they have sex in his living quarters. The next day, Brett sees what he believes to be footprints on the CCTV. He again calls Jacob, who expresses keen interest. When Martin and his assistant arrive, they reluctantly agree to investigate the warehouse in person. Brett is frustrated when they reveal nothing, though Jacob warns Brett never to enter the warehouse alone. After experiencing disturbing nightmares, Brett calls Zara. As they have sex, Brett hallucinates that Zara is his dead wife, disturbing him greatly.

Zara shows up at the building later, saying Brett has blown her off for several days. Brett denies this, but before she can explain, Jacob visits Brett and explains some of the building's story. The building's original architect, and now its only resident, was chosen to protect one of the seven gateways to the Nightworld, a place where the dead reside. Although this guardian extended his life through alchemy, he is now dying. Once the guardian dies, Jacob believes the barriers put in place may be weakened enough for powerful entities to enter our world. Jacob demands Brett accompany him to the warehouse and attempt to close the gateway before it is too late, but Brett disbelieves him.

Alex arrives at the building, worried that Brett has been unreachable for the past five days. Jacob says the Nightworld has no concept of time, and this may be an explanation. Brett, who still does not believe in the Nightworld, attempts to call Martin. When Jacob shows Brett a large number of footprints on the CCTV footage, Brett, Jacob, Alex, and Zara enter the warehouse together. As the guardian dies, a crowd of revenants kills Alex. Jacob attempts to lead the group back out, but Brett becomes separated. He comes upon Ana, and, though confused, leads her to the warehouse's door, where he finds Zara and Jacob. Jacob is killed before he can open the door, and Zara is injured while retrieving the key.

After escaping the warehouse, Ana demands they reopen the door. Zara tells Brett that this is not his wife, and Ana attacks her. To save Zara, Brett kills Ana. As Brett and Zara flee the building, the revenants who have escaped the warehouse attack them. Once they leave the building, Zara dies from her wounds. As Brett mourns her death, she rises from the dead and attempts to kill him. Brett is suddenly rescued by Pritchard, the building's owner. After learning Brett is the sole survivor, Pritchard assures Brett that everything will be taken care of. As Brett leaves the building's premises, he sees the ghosts of Jacob, Zara, Ana, and others, stuck in the building.

== Cast ==
- Jason London as Brett
- Robert Englund as Jacob
- Gianni Capaldi as Martin
- Lorina Kamburova as Zara
- Diana Lyubenova as Ana
- Atanas Srebrev as Alex

== Production ==
Director Patricio Valladares, who had worked with producer Loris Curci on several other international films, joined the project before it was funded when Curci asked him to contribute a poster. Curci suggested the film be shot in the style of an old Italian horror film; Valladares described the resulting film as "Sinister (2012) meets The Ninth Gate (1999)". Englund had also worked with Curci several times previously, including a big project that fell apart. Curci and Englund stayed in contact, and Curci brought Nightworld to Englund. Though London and Englund both had the same agent, they had never worked together before, which further interested Englund in the project. The film's crew was mostly Bulgarian, and the director was Chilean. Englund speaks basic Spanish but relied on Curci, an Italian, to translate between English and Spanish.

== Reception ==
Noel Murray of the Los Angeles Times wrote that although the film has a "rich, shadowy look", it is mostly "buildup without payoff".
