= Hidden in the Woods (2014 film) =

- Film poster
- Directed by: Patricio Valladares
- Screenplay by: Bradley Marcus; Kevin Marcus
- Based on: Hidden in the Woods by Patricio Valladares; Andrea Cavaletto
- Produced by: Jennifer Blanc; Loris Curci
- Starring: Michael Biehn
- Cinematography: Shawn Welling
- Edited by: Vance Crofoot; Jorge Melia; Patricio Valladares
- Music by: Luigi Seviroli
- Release date: November 2014
- Running time: 98 minutes
- Country: United States
- Language: English

Hidden in the Woods is a 2014 American thriller film directed by Patricio Valladares and starring Michael Biehn. The film also stars Jennifer Blanc and William Forsythe. It is a remake of Valladares' 2012 film of the same name. Biehn and Blanc serve as producers of the film.

== Plot ==
Hidden in the Woods tells the story of two sisters who have been raised in isolation, subjected to the torment of their abusive, drug dealing father. When they finally decide to report him to the police, he kills the two officers and is put in jail. But things go from bad to worse when the girls must answer to their Uncle Costello, a psychotic drug kingpin, who shows up looking for his missing merchandise which is hidden in the woods

== Cast ==
- Michael Biehn as Oscar Crooker
- Jeannine Kaspar as Ana
- Electra Avellan as Anny
- Chris Browning as Jed James
- William Forsythe as Uncle Costello

== Production ==
The film was shot in Texas.

== Reception ==
Luiz H.C. of Bloody Disgusting gave the film a mixed review and wrote "only the most desensitized of horror-hounds will enjoy this peculiar remake." Matt Boiselle of Dread Central awarded the film two and a half stars out of five.
