= The Blood Bond =

- Film poster
- Directed by: Michael Biehn; Antony Szeto (co-director)
- Screenplay by: Dan Bush; Conal Byrne; Brian Ransom
- Story by: Bey Logan; Nick Eriksson
- Produced by: Bey Logan
- Starring: Michael Biehn; Simon Yam; Phoenix Chou; Emma Pei; Jennifer Blanc
- Cinematography: Ross W. Clarkson
- Edited by: Ken Yu
- Music by: Longan So
- Distributed by: Fundamental Films; The Weinstein Company
- Release dates: June 17, 2010 (Malaysia); January 27, 2011 (Hong Kong)
- Running time: 86 minutes
- Countries: United States; China
- Language: English

The Blood Bond (also known as Shadowguard) is a 2010 action thriller film directed by Michael Biehn, with additional material by Antony Szeto. It was produced by Bey Logan and stars Michael Biehn, Simon Yam and Phoenix Chou. The Blood Bond premiered at 2010 Cannes Film Market.

== Premise ==
The story follows a quest to save an Asian spiritual leader whose rare blood type only has one donor left alive in the fictional war-torn nation of Bandanesia.

== Cast ==
- Michael Biehn as Mike Tremayne
- Simon Yam as Lompoc
- Phoenix Chou as Deva
- Emma Pei as Guang Di
- Jennifer Blanc as Jesse
- Thomas Siu Hung Ho as Chang
- Kenny Lo as Nico
- Ridwan Amir as Brando

== Marketing ==
The teaser trailer was released on March 15, 2010.

After the original film received a very mixed reaction at Cannes, additional footage was added to the film from a promo trailer originally announced as part of a planned sequel, these bookend scenes feature Phoenix Chou's character demonstrating her fighting skills.

== Controversy ==
Shortly after principal photography was completed by director Michael Biehn, producer Bey Logan took over post-production. Several elements of the movie in post-production, including additional scenes and the re-dubbing of Michael Biehn's voice by another actor, were added or altered from the original direction of the film. The original version of the movie debuted to very poor response at the 2010 Cannes Film Market, and further changes were made to the movie including further changes in story structure and the addition of scenes originally shot as part of a proposed sequel directed by Antony Szeto, shoe-horned into the movie to try to make the film appear more marketable.

As a result of this altered direction in post-production, Michael Biehn has since distanced himself from the movie and no longer considers this movie as his directorial debut.

The film eventually received a limited theatrical release in Hong Kong as Shadowguard: The Blood Bond Saga, receiving one of the lowest box office returns for any theatrical release.
