= Mojave Moon =

- Directed by: Kevin Dowling
- Written by: Leonard Glasser
- Produced by: Matt Salinger
- Starring: Danny Aiello; Anne Archer; Angelina Jolie; Michael Biehn; Alfred Molina
- Cinematography: James Glennon
- Edited by: Susan R. Crutcher
- Music by: Johnny Caruso; Denys Gawronski
- Distributed by: Initial Entertainment Group
- Release date: November 9, 1996
- Running time: 91 minutes
- Country: United States
- Language: English

Mojave Moon is a 1996 American road movie. It stars Danny Aiello, Anne Archer, Michael Biehn, Angelina Jolie and Jack Noseworthy. The film was written by Leonard Glasser and directed by Kevin Dowling.

== Plot ==
Al McCord is hanging out at his favourite restaurant when he meets an attractive young woman, Ellie, who is looking for a ride from the city into the Mojave Desert, where her mother Julie lives. Al discovers romance with the free-spirited Julie despite the nearby presence of her boyfriend Boyd, who seems likely to go berserk at any moment. Strange events follow and it's up to Al to find an explanation.

In the desert, Al's car develops a flat tire. He opens the trunk and discovers an apparent dead body (Ellie's boyfriend Kaiser, whom Al had not yet been aware of). Al heads to a gas station for repairs, following a near run-in with a highway patrolman, when he is interrupted by an attempted robbery. The confusion created by the gun-happy gas station worker allows Al to escape unhurt.

Back home, Al is visited by Ellie, followed by Julie. Unknown to him at this point, his car is being stolen. Outside they notice Boyd and flee to a nearby motel. Just after Al leaves to search for his car, Boyd arrives at the motel, taking the women back to Mojave and locking them in a shed.

Al and actor buddy Sal mount a rescue mission but are themselves knocked out by Boyd. Kaiser, still alive, arrives at Mojave unseen as Boyd drives off with Al, Sal, Julie, and Ellie in the car atop his truck, intending to tip the car and passengers over the edge of a quarry. They eventually escape uninjured while Boyd plummets to his doom, signaled by an ostentatious explosion.

Ellie returns to Los Angeles with Sal, while Al remains for the night, at least, with Julie.

== Cast ==
- Danny Aiello as Al
- Anne Archer as Julie
- Michael Biehn as Boyd
- Angelina Jolie as Ellie
- Alfred Molina as Sal
- Jack Noseworthy as Kaiser
- Zack Norman as Terry
- Peter MacNicol as Tire Repairman
- John Getz as Police Officer
- Lee Arenberg as Friendly Motorist
- Corin Nemec as Car Thief
- Leonard Termo as Shorty
- Lewis Arquette as Charlie
- Michael Berryman as Angel
- Rolando Molina as Second Guy
- Michael Massee as Fifth Guy
