= Trials of the Blood Dragon =

2016 video game

- Developer: Ubisoft RedLynx
- Publisher: Ubisoft
- Composer: Power Glove
- Series: Trials
- Platforms: Microsoft Windows; PlayStation 4 Xbox One
- Release: June 13, 2016
- Genre: Platform
- Mode: Single-player

Trials of the Blood Dragon is a 2016 platform game developed by Ubisoft RedLynx and published by Ubisoft. As a crossover game of Far Cry 3: Blood Dragon and the Trials series, the game was released for Microsoft Windows, PlayStation 4 and Xbox One in June 2016.

== Gameplay ==
The player controls Blood Dragon's protagonist Rex Power Colt's kids Roxanne and Slayter as they ride on a physics-based motorcycle from the start of the level to the end while navigating a number of obstacles. The game introduces a grappling hook and gameplay segments in which players need to disembark from their bike and use guns to shoot enemies or utilise stealth to avoid hostile attention. The game features 27 levels.

== Development ==
Ubisoft announced and released Trials of the Blood Dragon during their E3 2016 press conference. Players who complete the challenges in the trial version can unlock the full game for free.

== Reception ==
Reception

Aggregate score
Aggregator	Score		
Aggregator	PC	PS4	Xbox One
Metacritic	54/100	55/100	57/100

Review scores
Publication	Score		
Publication	PC	PS4	Xbox One
4Players	59%	59%	59%
Destructoid	N/A	N/A	4/10
Edge	N/A	3/10	N/A
Eurogamer	N/A	Avoid	N/A
GameSpot	N/A	7/10	N/A
Hardcore Gamer	N/A	N/A	3/5
IGN	N/A	6.9/10	6.9/10
PlayStation Official Magazine – UK	N/A	4/10	N/A
Official Xbox Magazine (UK)	N/A	N/A	3/10
PC Gamer (UK)	35%	N/A	N/A
Push Square	N/A	4/10	N/A
VideoGamer.com	N/A	5/10	N/A
National Post	N/A	5/10	N/A

Trials of the Blood Dragon received "mixed" reviews on all platforms according to the review aggregation website Metacritic.
