= Power Glove (band) =

Australian electronic music duo

Background information
- Origin: Melbourne, Victoria, Australia
- Genre: Synthwave
- Members: Michael Dudikoff; Michael Biehn; (Jarome Harmsworth and Joel Harmsworth)
- Website: powergloveaudio.com

Power Glove is an Australian electronic music duo from Melbourne, Victoria, named after the Power Glove made by Mattel for the Nintendo Entertainment System. They provided the soundtrack to the 1980s-influenced retro-futuristic video game Far Cry 3: Blood Dragon (April 2013). The soundtrack was met with critical acclaim.

== History ==
Power Glove was formed in Melbourne as the electronic music, synthwave duo with the pseudonyms of Michael Biehn and Michael Dudikoff, whose real names are brothers Jarome and Joel Harmsworth. They named the band based on a self-described obsession with the 1989 advertisements for the Power Glove accessory for the Nintendo Entertainment System.

The music gained widespread attention with the track "Hunters" featured in the 2011 Canadian independent film Hobo with a Shotgun and the track "Vengeance" in the 2012 film The ABCs of Death. Their first extended play, the four-track EP 1 (a.k.a. So Bad for its May 2010 debut on SoundCloud), was released in January, 2012. Tracks have appeared in various artists' compilation albums.

== Career ==
The duo provided the soundtrack to Far Cry 3: Blood Dragon (2013), which is a 1980s-influenced retro-futuristic video game. Michael Langley of CraveOnline described that Dean Evans of Ubisoft contacted the group and asked if they would create the soundtrack to the game. The group notes that the direction for their work on the soundtrack was based on succinct instructions: "Okay guys, three words, Purple Lazer Beams".

Since releasing their second EP, EPII, in 2015 the duo has scored the Blood Dragon themed iteration of the Trials video game series, Trials of the Blood Dragon which was released in June 2016 by Ubisoft.

On May 17, 2019, the duo released their third album, titled "Playback". The album was self-released on digital platforms, with a vinyl print being distributed by Electronic Purification Records.

The duo is featured in the 2019 documentary film The Rise of the Synths, which explores the origins and growth of the Synthwave genre, appearing alongside various other composers from the scene, including John Carpenter, who also stars and narrates.

On October 19, 2020, Power Glove debuted on independent music label Monstercat with Mercenary, in collaboration with music producer F.O.O.L, featured in Mercenary EP.

== Discography ==
=== Albums ===
Year	Title	Notes
2019	Playback	
2021	2043: Volume 1	

=== EPs ===
Year	Title	Notes
2012	EP 1	
2015	EP II	
2019	Throwback	

=== Singles ===
Year	Title	Record label
2012	Street Desire	NewRetroWave
2012	Hot For Destiny	NewRetroWave
2017	Fatal Affair	Lakeshore Records
2019	Phantasy	NewRetroWave
2020	Aeon (featuring Pylot)	NewRetroWave
2020	Brain Jack	Self release
2020	Feel It (Music from the Netflix Original Series High Score)	Maisie Music Publishing
2021	Wolf	So Bad

=== Remixes ===
Year	Title	Original artist(s)
2012	Modern Love	KRISTINE
2016	Roller Mobster	Carpenter Brut

=== Original soundtracks ===
- Far Cry 3: Blood Dragon (Original Game Soundtrack) (Ubisoft Music, May 2013)
- Trials of the Blood Dragon (Original Game Soundtrack) (Ubisoft Music, June 2016)
- Devil May Cry (Soundtrack from the Netflix Series) (Netflix Music, April 2025)
- Devil May Cry: Season 2 (Soundtrack from the Netflix Series) (Netflix Music, May 2026)

=== Live Streams ===
- Digital Mirage 3 (December 2020, self-released)
