= The Victim (2011 film) =

- Film poster, North America
- Directed by: Michael Biehn
- Written by: Michael Biehn; Reed Lackey
- Produced by: Jennifer Blanc; Lucien Flynn; Lorna Paul; Travis Romero
- Starring: Michael Biehn; Jennifer Blanc; Ryan Honey; Denny Kirkwood; Danielle Harris
- Cinematography: Eric Curtis
- Edited by: Vance Crofoot
- Music by: Jeehun Hwang
- Production company: Anchor Bay
- Distributed by: BlancBiehn Productions
- Release date: April 12, 2011 (AMC Kansas City Festival)
- Country: United States
- Language: English
- Budget: $800,000

The Victim is a 2011 American horror film directed, written and starring Michael Biehn, produced by and co-starring Jennifer Blanc. Described as a grindhouse film, it was produced and shot in less than two weeks in Los Angeles in 2010. Most of the principal photography took place in the Topanga Canyon, close to Malibu, California.

== Plot summary ==
Annie's (Jennifer Blanc) life is in jeopardy after she's witnessed the horrific rape and murder of her closest friend. Fleeing from two attackers (Ryan Honey, Denny Kirkwood) she stumbles across Kyle (Michael Biehn), a recluse living in the middle of the woods. Kyle finds the stillness of the woods comforting. The ruggedly handsome loner stays far from civilization - that is - until a single knock on his door throws his solitary life into chaos.

== Cast ==
- Michael Biehn as Kyle Limato
- Jennifer Blanc as Annie
- Ryan Honey as Harrison
- Danielle Harris as Mary
- Denny Kirkwood as Coogan

== Reception ==
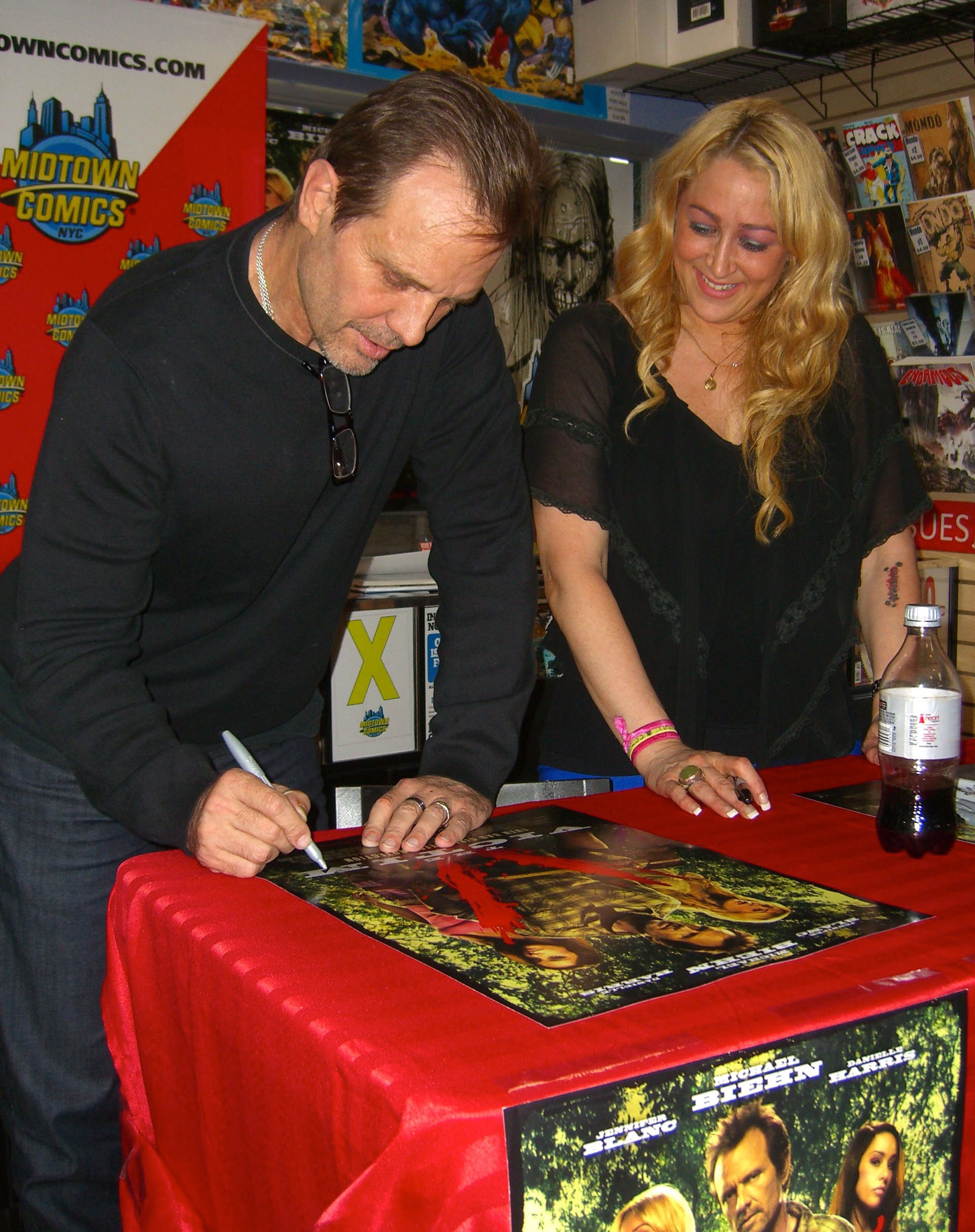
Stars and co-producers Michael Biehn and Jennifer Blanc promoting the film during an August 23, 2012 appearance at Midtown Comics in Manhattan.

Alan Cerny of Ain't It Cool News characterized The Victim as "a fun sleazy grindhouse film", in which Biehn was lauded for both giving a good performance and getting good performances out of his actors. Though Cerny stated that Biehn's directing effort exhibited imperfections such as a driving montage scene that he felt was too long, he appreciated that Biehn understood the genre in which he was working, commenting, "Biehn has a clear path to what he's shooting for, and for much of the film's running time, he gets it", and "It's a specific genre with a specific style, and working from that, Biehn gets way more right than he does wrong."

The New York Times wrote, "Directing his own screenplay, Mr. Biehn (working from a story by Reed Lackey) pays more attention to genitals than spatial coherence, unaware that labeling a film grind house doesn’t excuse soap-opera emoting and laughable dialogue. Wait, what am I saying? Of course it does." The film has a 35% approval rating on Rotten Tomatoes, based on 17 reviews.
