= Jennifer Blanc =

American actress

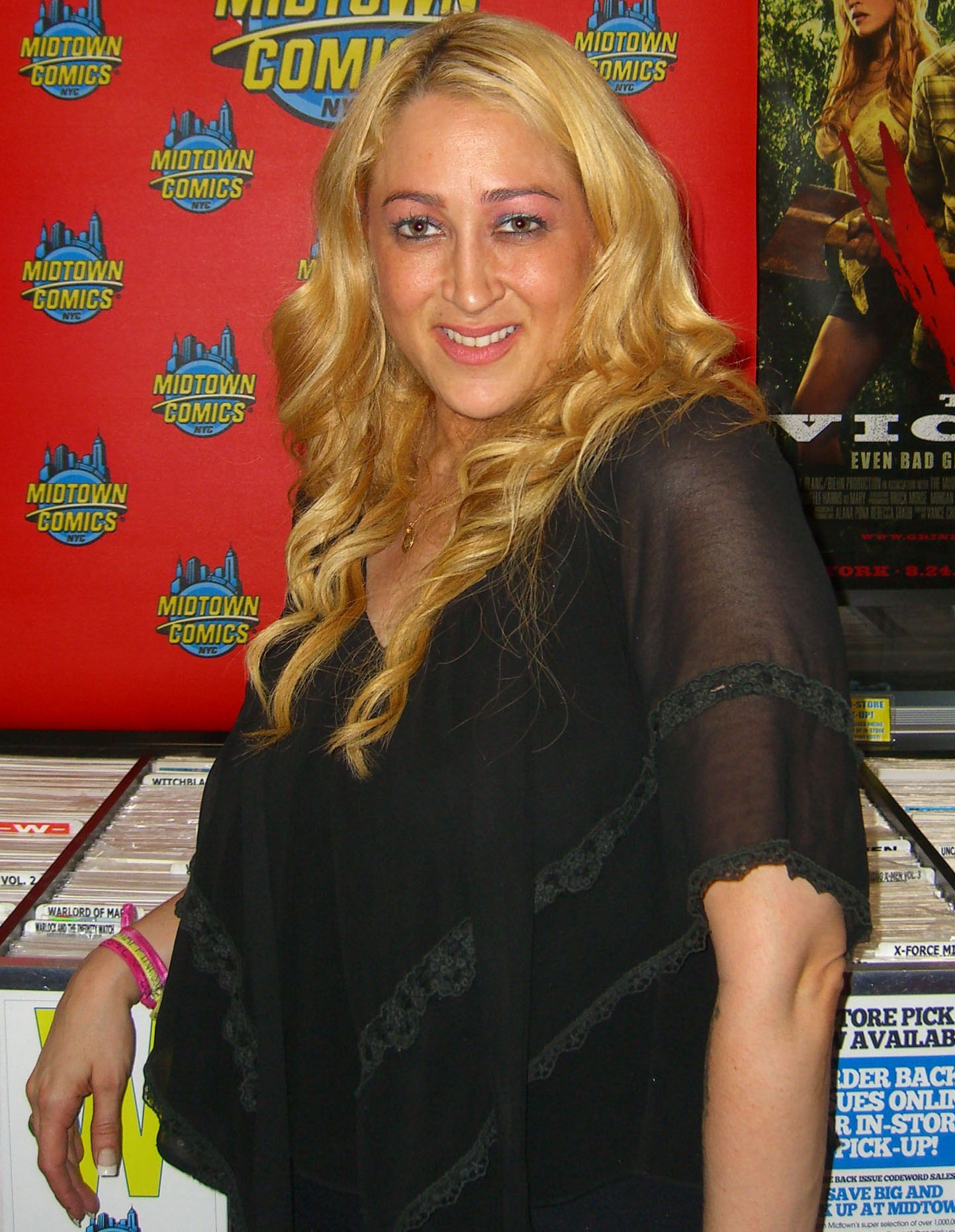
- Blanc promoting her film, The Victim, during an August 23, 2012 appearance at Midtown Comics in Manhattan.
- Occupation: Actress
- Years active: 1984–present
- Spouse: Michael Biehn (m. 2015)
- Children: 1

Jennifer Blanc is an American actress. She is married to actor Michael Biehn.

== Personal life ==
Blanc is married to Michael Biehn. The couple have one son, Dashiell King Biehn. The two were joint partners in "The Blanc/Biehn Production Company". She co-produced and starred alongside him in The Victim. She also co-starred in Good Family Times, a supernatural thriller film, which was also produced by Blanc/Biehn Productions.

== Selected filmography ==
=== Film ===
Year	Title	Role	Notes
1984	Old Enough		
1994	The Crow	voice	
1994	Asterix Conquers America	Etishu	Original version and French dub, uncredited
1995	The Brady Bunch Movie	Valley Girl	
1995	Balto	voice	uncredited
1997	Friends 'Til the End	Zanne Armstrong (Suzanne Boxer)	
1997	Dead Men Can't Dance	Sgt. 1st Class Susie Warzenak	
2010	The Blood Bond	Jesse	
2011	The Divide	Liz	
2011	Puncture	Stephany	
2011	The Victim	Annie	
2011	Yellow Rock	Monica	
2012	Bad Ass	Frances	
2014	Hidden in the Woods		
2014	Everly	Dena	
2013	Wrong Cops	Ruth	
2016	Havenhurst	Paula	

=== Television ===
Year	Title	Role	Notes
1991	Married... with Children	Margie	1 episode
1993	Saved by the Bell	Melissa	1 episode
1993–94	The Mommies	Tiffany	(TV series)
1994	Cool and the Crazy		TV
1994–95	Party of Five	Kate Bishop	
1997	The Ride	Linnette Stillwell	
2000–01	Dark Angel	Kendra Maibaum	
2007	Veronica Mars	Catholic School Girl	1 episode
2012	Nuclear Family	Jen	web series
