= Michael Biehn =

American actor (born 1956)

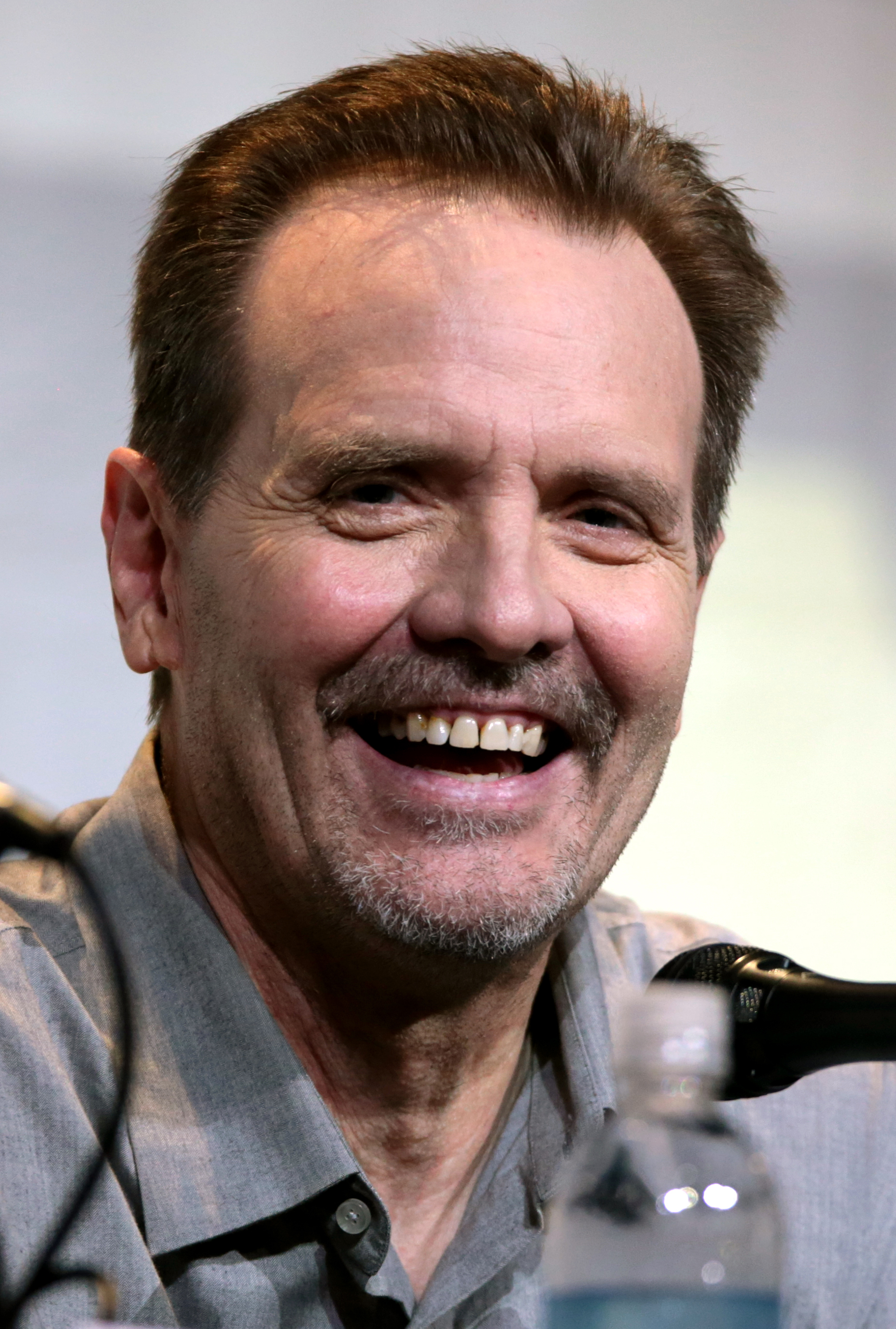
- Biehn at the 2016 San Diego Comic-Con
- Born: Michael Connell Biehn; July 31, 1956 (age 70); Anniston, Alabama, U.S.
- Occupation: Actor
- Years active: 1977–present
- Spouses: Carlene Olson (m. 1980; div. 1987) Gina Marsh (m. 1988; div. 2014) Jennifer Blanc (m. 2015)
- Children: 5

Michael Connell Biehn (/ˈbiːn/; born July 31, 1956) is an American actor, primarily known for his roles in science fiction films directed by James Cameron; as Sgt. Kyle Reese in The Terminator (1984), Cpl. Dwayne Hicks in Aliens (1986), and Lt. Hiram Coffey in The Abyss (1989). His other films include The Fan (1981), The Seventh Sign (1988), Navy SEALs (1990), Tombstone (1993), The Rock (1996), Mojave Moon (1996), Megiddo: The Omega Code 2 (2001), Clockstoppers (2002), and Planet Terror (2007). On television, he has appeared in Hill Street Blues (1984), The Magnificent Seven (1998–2000), and Adventure Inc. (2002–2003). He also provided the voice for Sergeant Rex "Power" Colt in Far Cry 3: Blood Dragon.

== Early life ==
Michael Connell Biehn was born on July 31, 1956, in Anniston, Alabama, the second of three boys born to Marcia (née Connell) and Don Biehn, a lawyer. His surname is of German origin.

When Biehn was young, he moved with his family to Lincoln, Nebraska, and then to Lake Havasu City, Arizona, where he was a member of the high school drama club before graduating. He attended the drama program at the University of Arizona, where he was a member of the Sigma Nu fraternity before moving to Hollywood.

== Career ==
Biehn got his start in films with a small part in Grease (1978). He appears in two scenes; in one scene, John Travolta's character, Danny, hits Biehn's uncredited character in the stomach while playing basketball. Shortly thereafter, he appeared in the 1978 made for television movie, A Fire in the Sky. He had his first leading role when he played a deranged stalker in the 1981 thriller The Fan, opposite Lauren Bacall. On television, Biehn made a guest appearance on Hill Street Blues.

In 1984, Biehn played Kyle Reese, a soldier sent back in time by John Connor to save his mother, Sarah Connor, in the film The Terminator. Biehn appeared opposite Arnold Schwarzenegger and Linda Hamilton; the film was directed by James Cameron. Biehn stated in 2019 that he was initially not enthusiastic about appearing in a Schwarzenegger film, as he had hoped to act alongside the likes of Al Pacino and Robert De Niro. Biehn went on to have a small role in the sequel, Terminator 2: Judgment Day (1991), briefly reprising his role as Reese in a scene cut from the final film but restored for the Director's Cut version. In 2019, Biehn confirmed in an interview that he would not be reprising the role for Terminator: Dark Fate or any other future installments.

Biehn starred in a second film directed by James Cameron: Aliens (1986), in which he portrayed Corporal Hicks, a corporal in the Colonial Marines. Originally, Hicks was to be portrayed by James Remar, who was fired from Aliens shortly after production started. Cameron chose Biehn as a last-minute replacement, being familiar with Biehn as they previously worked together on The Terminator, so Biehn could immediately begin filming without having to go through "boot camp" training as the rest of the cast had done. Due to his late casting, Biehn was unable to customize his character's combat armor as the other actors had done. Biehn rejected the padlock heart motif that he was given, joking that it was like a giant bullseye on his chest. Sigourney Weaver, who portrayed protagonist Ellen Ripley in Aliens, praised Biehn for bringing "a sensitivity to the role of Hicks, an alpha male who had no problem following a woman's lead". For his work in Aliens, Biehn was nominated for a Saturn Award for Best Actor.

In an early draft of Alien 3 written by William Gibson, Biehn's character Hicks, who had survived the events of Aliens, was to become the protagonist, replacing Ellen Ripley (Sigourney Weaver). Walter Hill and David Giler wrote the final script, which had Hicks killed off in the opening scene. Biehn, furious upon learning of his character's demise, demanded and received almost as much money for the use of his likeness in one scene as he had been paid for his entire role in Aliens. Biehn reprised the role of Hicks by voicing the character in the video game Aliens: Colonial Marines and again in 2019 for an audio drama adaptation of Gibson's un-filmed script for Alien 3 released by Audible.

Biehn had his third collaboration with James Cameron in The Abyss (1989), portraying Lieutenant Hiram Coffey who has high-pressure nervous syndrome. Biehn received strong reviews for his performance, with the studio lobbying unsuccessfully for him to be nominated for an Oscar as Best Supporting Actor.

Biehn played the role of Johnny Ringo in Tombstone, including in the showdown scene with Val Kilmer as Doc Holliday.

Biehn portrayed a Navy SEAL for the third time in the action film The Rock (1996). While The Rock was the most successful film of Biehn's career in terms of box office gross, it saw his billing and screen time diminished, and after that he never landed another part in a big-budget Hollywood film.

Later, Biehn took acting roles ranging from low-budget films such as The Art of War and Clockstoppers to video games like Command & Conquer: Tiberian Sun and independent movies, such as Havoc. He starred in three TV series including the CBS drama The Magnificent Seven (1998–2000), the Tribune Entertainment syndicated TV series Adventure Inc. (2002–2003), and the NBC TV series Hawaii (2004). All three shows were cancelled because of low ratings. Biehn was considered to portray Colonel Miles Quaritch, the main antagonist of James Cameron's science fiction epic film Avatar (2009), but Cameron felt his appearance in the film coupled with that of Weaver would remind people too much of Aliens.

Biehn directed the 2010 film The Blood Bond. In 2011 he wrote, directed and starred in The Victim. In 2020, Biehn was cast as the villain Lang in the second season of the Star Wars television series The Mandalorian. In 2022, he portrayed Ian in the eleventh season of the AMC horror series The Walking Dead.

In 2025, Biehn returned to the Alien/Predator franchise by voicing the character Vandy in the animated film Predator: Killer of Killers.

== Personal life ==
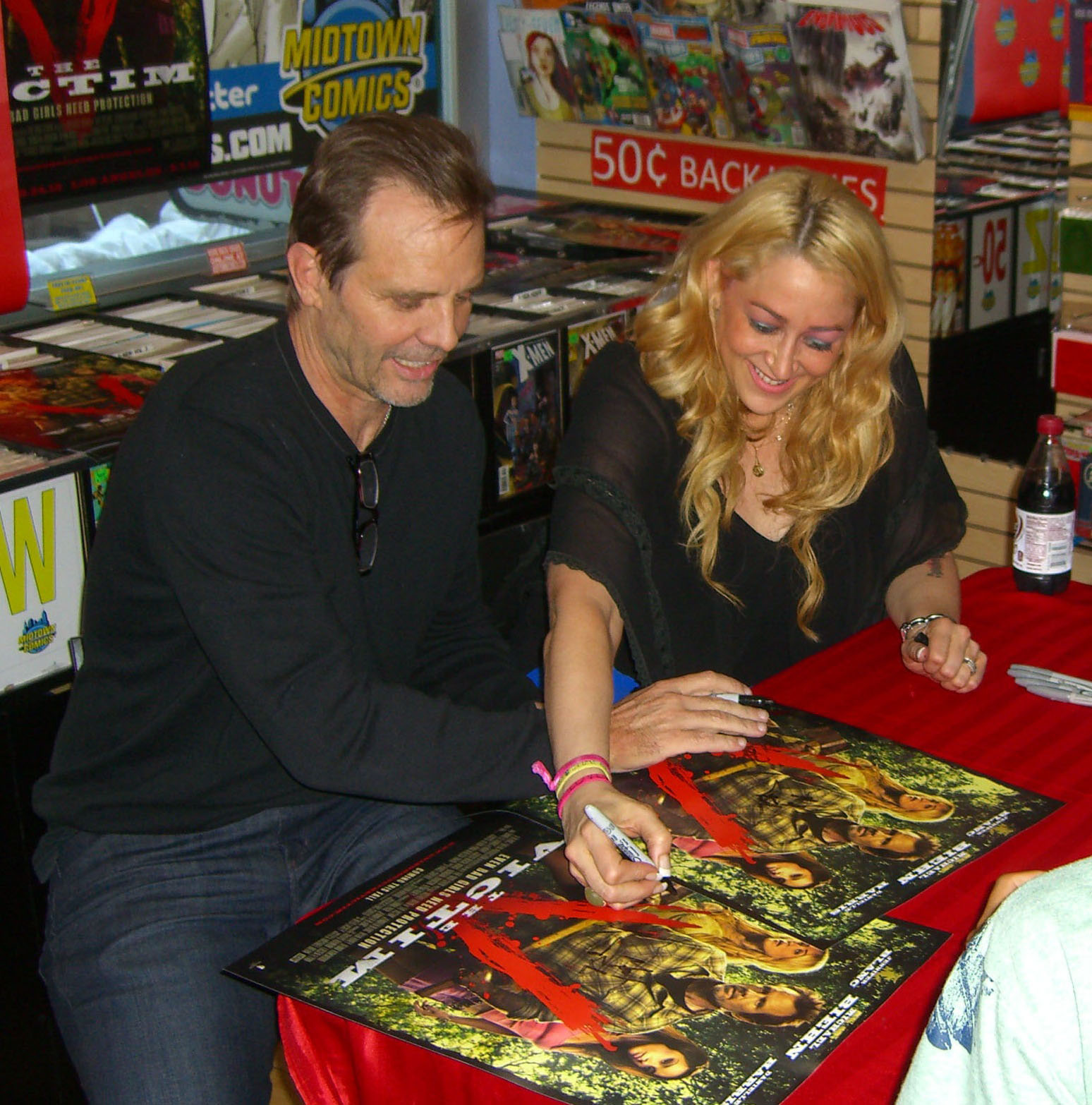
Biehn and his future wife, actress Jennifer Blanc, in 2012, promoting The Victim, which they co-produced, and which Biehn starred in and directed

Coinciding with the decline of his acting career during the 1990s, Biehn suffered from alcoholism until the mid-2000s. Biehn suffered a stroke around 2008 and had open heart surgery. When questioned on why he did not attain stardom despite having lead roles in well-regarded hit films like The Terminator and Aliens, Biehn told the Hollywood Reporter "People always talk about me being an '80s star. I was not an '80s star. Bruce Willis was an '80s star. Tom Cruise was an '80s star. Schwarzenegger and Stallone. Mel Gibson. Those guys were making $20 million [a picture]. I never even got $1 million. I kind of liked it that way."

Biehn remains financially comfortable due to his Screen Actors Guild pension. James Cameron suggested that "what held Michael back was that he didn't like playing the Hollywood game — schmoozing people and all that. For him it was all about the work". Biehn has never hired a publicist and was reportedly never interested in the "fame aspect of the business, even though his agent — and Cameron — both believed he had what it took to be a major star".

Biehn has been married three times and has five sons. In 2019, he stated that he had prioritized his family over his acting career by turning down projects involving long film shoots. Biehn's second wife was Gina Marsh. As of 2016, Biehn is married to actress Jennifer Blanc, who co-produced and starred alongside him in The Victim. The couple has one son, Dashiell King Biehn.

== Accolades ==
Institution	Year	Category	Work	Result
Saturn Awards	1987	Best Actor	Aliens	Nominated
Saturn Awards	1991	Special Award	—N/a	Won
Saturn Awards	2011	Life Career Award	—N/a	Won
Saturn Awards	2022	Best Guest Starring Role on Television	The Walking Dead	Nominated
Sitges Film Festival	2011	Time-Machine Honorary Award	—N/a	Won
