= List of commercial video games released as freeware =

This is a list of commercial video games released as freeware; games that, in their original license, were not considered freeware, but were re-released at a later date with a freeware license, sometimes as publicity for a forthcoming sequel or compilation release.

Some of the following games are not freely redistributable software, as they have only been made available as a free download as freeware, but may only be downloaded from certain websites and with the explicit permission of the copyright owner. Consult the software license agreement.

For games that were originally released as freeware, see List of freeware video games. For free and open-source games, and proprietary games re-released as FLOSS, see List of open-source video games. For proprietary games with released source code (and proprietary or freeware content), see List of commercial video games with available source code.

== Games ==
The following formerly commercial games have been made available as freeware and are still in that status:

Title	First release	Freeware release	Genre	Platform(s)	Publisher	Additional information
3 in Three	1989		Puzzle	Mac OS	Cliff Johnson	
Adventure Fun-Pak	1989	2004	Adventure, Action	MS-DOS	Apogee Software	
Adventureland	1978	1993	Adventure, interactive fiction	TRS-80, Apple II, Atari 8-bit, TI-99/4A, PET, Commodore 64, IBM PC, VIC-20, ZX Spectrum, BBC Micro, Electron	Scott Adams	
The Adventures of Fatman	2003	2003	A point-and-click adventure	Windows	Michael Doak	Released on studio's closing as CC-ND-NC "abandonware"
Adventures of Maddog Williams in the Dungeons of Duridian, The	1992	1996	Adventure	Amiga, Atari ST, DOS	Game Crafters	
Adventures of Robbo	1994	2006	Puzzle	DOS	Epic MegaGames	
Adventures of Robby Roto!, The	1981	1999	Maze (Puzzle)	Arcade	Bally Midway	
Alien Cabal	1997	2000	First-person shooter	MS-DOS, Windows	QASoft	
Alien Carnage (a.k.a. Halloween Harry)	1994	2007	Platform	MS-DOS	Apogee Software	
Allegiance	2000	2004	Space simulation/Real-time strategy/Action	Windows	Microsoft Research	Source code released as freeware; gaming enthusiasts developed Free Allegiance from the released code.
All Walls Must Fall	2018	2024	Strategy	Windows, Linux, Mac	Inbetweengames	
Amulets & Armor	1997	2013	Action/Role-playing video game	DOS	United Software Artists	
Anacreon: Reconstruction 4021	1987	2004	Strategy	DOS	Thinking Machine Associates	Updated in 2004 by George Moromisato to run natively on Windows.
Antheads: It Came from the Desert 2	1990		Adventure	Amiga	Cinemaware	Expansion pack to It Came from the Desert.
Arctic Adventure	1991	2009	Platformer	DOS	Apogee Software	
Ares	1996	2008	Space simulation/Real-time strategy	Mac OS	Ambrosia Software	Source code has been released under GPLv3, much of the media released under creative commons, Antares, a straight port, and Xsera, a derivative project were created.
At the Carnival	1989		Puzzle	Mac OS, DOS	Cliff Johnson	
Bad Day on the Midway	1995	2022	Adventure	Windows, Mac	Inscape	
Baseball Mogul 2006	2005	2006	Sports management	Windows	Sports Mogul	
Battlecruiser 3000AD	1996	2001	Space simulator	Windows	Derek Smart	
Battlecruiser Millennium	2003	2005	Space simulator	Windows	Derek Smart	
Battle of Britain	2001		Flight simulator	Windows	Empire Interactive	Only source code available.
Battle of the Eras	1995	2013	Fighting	DOS	Procryon	
BC Kid	1992		Platform game	Amiga	Factor 5	
Beneath a Steel Sky	1994	2003	Adventure	Amiga, DOS	Virgin Interactive	Released to support the ScummVM Project.
Beyond Castle Wolfenstein	1984		Stealth game	DOS	Muse Software	
Beyond the Titanic	1986	1998	Text adventure game	DOS	Apogee Software	
Bio Menace	1993	2005	Side-scrolling platform game	DOS	Apogee Software	
Blackthorne	1994	2013	Cinematic platform	DOS	Interplay Productions	
Blades of Exile	1997	2007	Role-playing video game	Mac, Windows	Jeff Vogel of Spiderweb Software	The source code has also been released; the game is still being sold on CD, but the open source version contains the full game content.
Boppin'	1994	2005	Puzzle	Amiga, DOS	Apogee Software	
Castle Infinity	1996	2000	MMOG	Windows	Starwave	
Castle of the Winds	1989	1998	Role-playing video game	Windows 3.x	Epic MegaGames	
Caves of Thor	1989	2005	Adventure	DOS	Apogee Software	
Championship Manager: Season 01/02	2001	2009	Sports management	Windows, Mac OS, Xbox	Eidos Interactive	
Clonk Endeavour	2004	2008	Platform/Real-time strategy	Windows, Mac OS X, Linux	RedWolf Design	Only Windows version was released as freeware.
Clyde's Adventure	1992	2005	Platform	DOS	Moonlite Software	
Clyde's Revenge	1995	2005	Platform	DOS	Moonlite Software	
Command & Conquer	1995	2007	Real-time strategy	Windows, Mac OS	Virgin Interactive	
Command & Conquer: Red Alert	1996	2008	Real-time strategy	Windows, Mac OS	Virgin Interactive	Made freeware in 2008 to promote the release of Command & Conquer: Red Alert 3.
Command & Conquer: Tiberian Sun	1999	2010	Real-time strategy	Windows	Electronic Arts	Made freeware (along with its expansion pack Firestorm) on February 12, 2010, to promote the release of Command & Conquer 4: Tiberian Twilight.
Cybersphere	1996	2006	Arkanoid-style game	DOS	Psycon Software	
Cybersphere Plus	1997	2006	Arkanoid-style game	DOS	Psycon Software	
Dark Ages	1991	2009	Platform	DOS	Apogee Software	
Dark Horizons Lore: Invasion	2005	2007	Mech simulation	Linux, Windows, Mac OS	GarageGames	
Death Rally	1996	2009	Racing game	DOS, Windows	Apogee Software	
Defender of the Crown	1986		Strategy game	Amiga, Amstrad CPC, Apple II, Atari ST, Commodore 64, MS-DOS, Game Boy Advance, Mac, NES, ZX Spectrum	Cinemaware	
Dink Smallwood	1997	1999	Role-playing video game	Windows, Linux, Mac OS	Iridon Interactive	
Dreamweb	1992	2012	Adventure	Amiga, DOS	Empire Interactive Entertainment	
The Elder Scrolls: Arena	1994	2004	Role-playing video game	DOS	Bethesda Softworks	Floppy disk version released as freeware in 2004 to mark the 10th anniversary of the TES series, and as publicity release prior to the 4th installment, Oblivion.
The Elder Scrolls II: Daggerfall	1996	2009	Role-playing video game	DOS	Bethesda Softworks	Sequel to the aforementioned Arena. Released as freeware on July 9, 2009, to mark the 15th anniversary of the TES series.
Electro Man	1993	2006	Sidescroller	DOS	Created by xLand Games and published by Epic MegaGames	
Enemy Nations	1997	2001	Real-time strategy	Windows	Windward Studios	
Executioners	1992	2005	Beat 'em up	DOS	Bloodlust Software	
F.E.A.R. Combat	2005	2006	First-person shooter, horror	Windows	Monolith Productions	Originally released as the multiplayer portion of F.E.A.R.
Fish Fillets	1998	2002	Puzzle	Linux, Mac OS X, Windows, and others	Altar Games	The original Fish Fillets was released under the GPL in 2002. Subsequently, the Fish Fillets NG project has recoded the engine to enable multi-platform release.
Flight of the Amazon Queen	1995	2004	Adventure	Amiga, DOS	Renegade Software	Released to support the ScummVM Project.
The Fool's Errand	1987		Puzzle	Mac OS, MS-DOS, Amiga, Atari ST	Miles Computing	
Full Spectrum Warrior	2004	2008	Real-time tactics	Windows	Pandemic Studios	Released as a free ad-supported download.
FS One 2022	2003	2022	RC Flight Sim	Windows	InertiaSoft	Dr. Michael Selig felt that dealing with sales was a distraction from his research and development. Game is still being developed.
Glider PRO	1994	2003		Mac OS, Mac OS X	Casady & Greene	When Casady & Greene went bankrupt, the rights to the series reverted to the author, John Calhoun, who opted to give a few versions of the game away for free on his website.
God of Thunder	1993		Puzzle, Action	DOS	Adept Software	
Gridlee	1983			Arcade	Videa	
Gridrunner	1982		Scrolling shooter	Atari 2600, VIC-20, ZX Spectrum, Commodore 64	Llamasoft	
Ground Control	2000	2004	Real-time tactics	Windows	Massive Entertainment	Registerware freeware released on July 1, 2004, to serve as promotion for its sequel, Ground Control II: Operation Exodus.
Hades 2	2001	2009	First-person shooter	Windows	Espaço Informática	
Hardwired (a pre-release version of Red Zone)	1994		Shooter	Sega Mega Drive/Genesis	Zyrinx	
Heartlight PC	1994	2006	Puzzle	Atari 8-bit, MS-DOS	Janusz Pelc (Atari), Epic MegaGames (port)	
Heros: The Sanguine Seven	1993	2005	Platform	DOS	Jeffrey Fullerton	Originally published in cooperation with Safari Software and Epic MegaGames.
Hidden & Dangerous Deluxe	1999	2003	Action game with tactical elements	Windows	Illusion Softworks	Released as freeware to serve as promotion for its sequel, Hidden & Dangerous 2.
Hitchhiker's Guide to the Galaxy	1984	2004	Adventure	Flash	Infocom	Made publicly available as a web-based game by the BBC.
Hong Kong 97	1995	2023	Shoot 'em up, satire	Super Famicom	Happysoft	
Infantry Online	1999	2007	2D MMORPG	Windows	Sony Online Entertainment	Similar to PlanetSide.
Inner Worlds	1996	2001	Platform	MS-DOS, Linux	Sleepless Software	Similar to Jill of the Jungle.
Ironseed	1994	2007	Space trading and combat simulator	DOS	Softdisk	Released as freeware by the author to promote a remake of the game.
It Came From The Desert	1989		Adventure	Amiga, Atari ST, DOS, Sega Genesis/Mega Drive, TurboGrafx-16	Cinemaware	
Jetpack	1993		Platform	MS-DOS	Software Creations (US)	
Katakis	1988		Side-scrolling shoot-em-up	Amiga	Factor 5	
Ken's Labyrinth	1993	1999	First-person shooter	DOS	Epic MegaGames	
Kiloblaster	1992	2008	Space shooter	DOS	Epic MegaGames	
King of Chicago	1987		Action, adventure, strategy game	Amiga, Apple II, Atari ST, DOS, Mac	Cinemaware	
Kroz	1987	2009	Adventure	DOS	Apogee Software	
Kye	1992	2008	Puzzle	Windows 3.x	Colin Garbutt	
Lode Runner Online: Mad Monks' Revenge	1995		Side-scrolling game	Windows, Mac OS	Sierra Entertainment	Based on the game Lode Runner.
Lords of the Rising Sun	1989		Arcade	Amiga, PC-Engine	Cinemaware	
Lure of the Temptress	1992	2003	Graphic adventure	Amiga, Atari ST, DOS	Virgin Interactive	
The Lost Vikings	1993	2014	Puzzle-platform	DOS	Interplay Productions	
Mad TV	1991		Management simulation game	DOS, Amiga	Rainbow Arts	
Major Stryker	1993	2006	Scrolling shooter	DOS	Apogee Software	
Marathon Trilogy	1994	2005	First-person shooter	Mac OS, Windows, Linux	Bungie	Source code to Marathon 2 was released in 2000, and code for Marathon Infinity was released in 2011.
MechWarrior 4: Mercenaries	2002	2010	Robotic simulation	Windows	FASA Interactive	
Monuments of Mars	1990	2009	Platform	DOS	Apogee Software	
Mystery House	1980	1987	Adventure	Apple II	On-Line Systems	Released into the Public Domain in 1987 to celebrate Sierra's 7th anniversary.
Nogginknockers	1993	2005	Sports	DOS	Bloodlust Software	
Nogginknockers 2	1996	2005	Sports	DOS	Bloodlust Software	
NoGravity	1998		Space combat simulator	Windows, Mac OS, Linux	realtech VR	
One Must Fall: 2097	1994	1999	Fighting	DOS	Epic MegaGames	
onEscapee	1997	2006	Action-adventure game	Windows, Amiga	Invictus Games, Ltd.	
Oo-topos	1987		Interactive fiction	Apple II, DOS	Polarware	
Out of the Park Baseball	1999	2002	Sports management	Windows, Mac OS X, Linux	Out of the Park Developments	
Overkill	1992	2008	Vertical scrolling-shooter	DOS	Precision Software Publishing / Epic MegaGames	
Pharaoh's Tomb	1990	2009	Platform	DOS	Apogee Software	
Postal	1997	2019	Top-down shooter	Windows	Running with Scissors	
Psi-Ops: The Mindgate Conspiracy	2005		Third-person shooter	Windows	Midway Games	Released through FilePlanet as ad-supported freeware.
Purge	2003		Online first-person shooter	Windows	Freeform Interactive	
Puzzle Fun-Pak	1989	2004	Puzzle, Action	MS-DOS	Apogee Software	
Railroad Tycoon Deluxe	1993	2006	Business simulator	DOS	MicroProse	
Riftspace	2000	2008	Space simulation	Windows	Starwraith 3D Games	
Rock n' Roll Racing	1993	2014	Racing	DOS	Interplay Productions	'Lite' version of the original Super NES game with just three playable tracks. This version has all rock music tracks changed to simple MIDI music, because the music license expired.
Rocket Ranger	1988		Action	Amiga, Apple II, Atari ST, Commodore 64, DOS, NES	Cinemaware	
R-Type	1989		Side-scrolling shoot-em-up	Amiga	Factor 5	
Sango Fighter	1993	2009	Fighting	DOS	Panda Entertainment	Released as freeware by current copyright holder Super Fighter Team.
Savage: The Battle for Newerth	2004		A blend of FPS and RTS gameplay	Windows, Linux, Mac OS X	S2 Games	
Savage 2: A Tortured Soul	2008	2008		Windows, Linux, Mac OS X		
S.D.I	1986		Action adventure	Amiga, Atari ST, Commodore 64, DOS, Macintosh	Cinemaware	
SimCity	1989	2008 (as OLPC SimCity)	City-building game	Windows, DOS		Was released under the GPLv3 for the One Laptop per Child project, and as Micropolis to the general public (the original title of the game).
Sinbad and the Throne of the Falcon	1987		Action	Amiga, Apple II, Atari ST, Commodore 64, DOS	Cinemaware	
SkiFree	1991		Arcade	Windows 3.0	Chris Pirih	
SkyRoads	1993		Driving	DOS	Bluemoon Interactive	
Söldner: Secret Wars	2004	2011	Tactical shooter	Windows	JoWood Productions	
Sołtys	1995	2011	Adventure game	DOS	LK Avalon	
Spheres of Chaos	1992	2007	Shooter game	Windows, Linux, RISC OS	Iain McLeod	
The Spirit Engine 2	2008	2010	A 2-D side-scrolling indie RPG	Windows	Mark Pay	
StarCraft	1998	2017	Real-time strategy	Windows, Mac OS	Blizzard Entertainment	Made freeware (along with its expansion pack Brood War) on April 19, 2017, to promote the release of StarCraft: Remastered. Accessible on Battlenet.
StarCraft 2	2010	2020	Real-time strategy	Windows, Mac OS	Blizzard Entertainment	The complete Wings of Liberty campaign, full use of Raynor, Kerrigan, and Artanis Co-Op Commanders, with all others available for free up to level five, full access to custom games, including all races, AI difficulties, maps; unranked multiplayer, with access to Ranked granted after the first 10 wins of the day in Unranked or Versus AI. Accessible on Battlenet.
Starshatter: The Gathering Storm	2004	2011	Space combat simulator	Windows	Destroyer Studios	Source code also released, content Freeware.
Stargunner	1996	2005	Side-scrolling shooter	DOS	3D Realms	
Starsiege: Tribes	1998	2004	First-person shooter	Windows	Dynamix/Sierra On-Line	Released as publicity for the release of Tribes: Vengeance.
Star Control II	1992	2002	Action adventure	DOS, Mac OS	Toys For Bob	Released as The Ur-Quan Masters.
Star Fleet I: The War Begins	1985		Strategy	DOS	Interstel	
Star Fleet II: Krellan Commander	1989		Strategy	DOS	Interstel	
Star Legions	1992		Strategy	DOS	Interstel	
Star Wraith II	2000		Space military simulation game		Starwraith 3D Games	
Star Wraith III: Shadows of Orion	2000		A space military simulation featuring multiplayer capabilities		Starwraith 3D Games	
Star Wraith IV: Reviction	2000	2008		Windows	Starwraith 3D Games	
Strange Adventures in Infinite Space	2002	2009			by Digital Eel	
Supaplex	1991		Boulder Dash-like puzzle game		Michael Stopp and Philip Jespersen	
Supernova	1987	1998	Text adventure	DOS	Apogee Software	
Super Fighter	1993	2001	Fighting	DOS	C&E, Inc.	Released as freeware by current copyright holder Super Fighter Team.
Super ZZT	1992		Adventure	DOS	Epic MegaGames	
S.W.I.N.E.	2001	2005	Real-time tactics game	DOS	StormRegion	Released as S.W.I.N.E. Free Christmas Edition.
Teen Agent	1995		Graphic adventure	DOS		
Telengard	1982		Dungeon crawl	DOS	Daniel Lawrence	
TerraFire	1997	2005	Space shooter	DOS	ORT Software	
The Three Stooges	1987		Action	Amiga, Apple II, Commodore 64, DOS, NES	Cinemaware	
Timeslaughter	1996	2005	Fighting	DOS	Bloodlust Software	Timeslaughter Lost, a prototype version of Timeslaughter, was also released in 2005 as freeware after a fan realized the version he had was different from the retail release and sent it to Bloodlust Software.
Total Extreme Wrestling 2005	2005	2009	Booking simulator	Windows	Greydog Software	
Traffic Department 2192	1994	2007	Top-down shooter	DOS	Epic MegaGames	
Transylvania I, II, III	1982, 1985, 1989		Adventure	Apple II, Commodore 64, DOS	Polarware	
Treasure Island Dizzy	1987		Puzzle		Oliver twins	
Tribes 2	2001	2004	First-person shooter	Windows, Linux	Dynamix/Sierra On-Line	Released as publicity for the release of Tribes: Vengeance.
Trivia Whiz	1988	2005	Trivia game	DOS	Apogee Software	
Turboraketti	1993		Cavern-flying game	Amiga	Heikki Kosola	
TV Sports Baseball	1990		Sports	Amiga, DOS, NES	Cinemaware	
TV Sports Basketball	1989		Sports	Amiga, DOS, PC-Engine	Cinemaware	
TV Sports Boxing	1991		Sports	Amiga, DOS	Cinemaware	
Tyrian	1995	2004	Scrolling shooter	DOS	Epic MegaGames	
Ultima IV: Quest of the Avatar	1985	1997	CRPG	DOS	Origin Systems	Re-released again in 2011 to promote Ultima Forever: Quest for the Avatar.
Ultima: Worlds of Adventure 2: Martian Dreams	1991	2012	CRPG	DOS	Origin Systems	Released by Electronic Arts exclusively through GOG.com.
Universal Combat	2004	2008	Space simulator	Windows	Derek Smart	
Unreal	1998	2024	First-person shooter	Windows	Epic MegaGames	
Unreal Tournament	1999	2024	First-person shooter	Windows	Epic MegaGames	
Vantage Master Online	1998	2002	Tactical RPG	Windows	Nihon Falcom	
Victory: The Age of Racing	2014	2016	Racing game	Windows	Vae Victis	
War Wind	1996	2020	Strategy	Windows	Strategic Simulations	
Warzone 2100	1999	2004		Windows, Mac OS X, Linux, FreeBSD, AmigaOS 4, PlayStation	Eidos Interactive	
WingNuts: Temporal Navigator	2001	2006	Shooter	Mac OS X	Freeverse Software	
Wings	1990		Flight simulator	Amiga	Cinemaware	
Wings	1996		Cavern-flying game		Miika Virpioja	
Wing Commander: Secret Ops	1998	1998	Space simulator	Windows		The full version was released by Origin as freeware on 27th of Aug 1998
Wolfenstein 3D	1992	2012	First-person shooter	Browser-based	id software	
Word Whiz	1988	2005	Trivia	DOS	Apogee Software	
Worlds of Ultima: The Savage Empire	1990	2012	CRPG	MS-DOS	Origin Systems	Released by Electronic Arts exclusively through GOG.com.
X-Men: The Ravages of Apocalypse	1997	2006	First-person shooter	MS-DOS, Linux, Mac, Windows	WizardWorks	The freeware release includes a walkthrough and a pre-installed patch (pak4.pak) to fix bugs and add additional gameplay features.
Xargon	1993	2008	Platform	DOS	Epic MegaGames	
Xenophage: Alien Bloodsport	1995	2006	Fighting game	DOS	Apogee Software	
ZZT	1991		Adventure	DOS	Epic MegaGames	

== Games no longer freely distributed ==
The following are commercial games that were once released as free downloads but were not freely redistributable software.

- Airborne Ranger (1988), a stealth 2D game by MicroProse. It was released as freeware by Atari to promote Airborne Rangers. A free registration was required to download the game. After Airborne Rangers wasn't released, the Airborne Ranger page and the download link were removed. The game is still mentioned as freeware and many forums and sites have the now dead link to the game page. The legal situation now is unclear because the installer has no disclaimer.
- Area 51 (2005), a first person shooter by Midway Games. Its free release was sponsored by the US Air Force. It later changed hands and its freeware status was removed.
- B-17 Flying Fortress (1992), a flight simulator by MicroProse.
- Battlefield 1942 (2002), a first person shooter by Electronic Arts, was available on Origin until it was removed, due to GameSpy shutting down.
- Betrayal at Krondor (1993), a role-playing game by Dynamix.
- Caesar (1992), a city-building game by Sierra.
- Dragonsphere (1994), a point-and-click graphic adventure game developed and published by MicroProse. Released as freeware by Atari in 2011 on GOG.com. The rights were brought by Tommo in 2015 and, after the expiration of the deal with Atari, began to charge for it.
- Gateway (1992), an adventure game by Legend Entertainment.
- Grand Theft Auto (1997)
- Grand Theft Auto 2 (1999)
- Red Baron 3D (1998), a flight game by Sierra.
- Rise and Fall: Civilizations at War (2006), a real-time strategy/third-person shooter by Stainless Steel Studios and Midway Games. Re-released as ad-supported freeware, sponsored by the US Air Force.
- The Sims 2 (2004), a life simulation game by Maxis and Electronic Arts. It was released as freeware for a limited time on Origin on July 16, 2014, to celebrate the 10th anniversary of The Sims 2. It was removed from Origin on July 31, 2014.
- The Suffering (2004), a horror third/first person shooter developed by Surreal Software and published by Midway Games. It was released free in September 2008 sponsored by the US Air Force, but is no longer available due to a new copyright holder.
- Tom Clancy's Ghost Recon (2001), a tactical shooter by Ubisoft. Released in an ad-supported free download version in 2007 for a limited time; available to US residents only.
- Wild Metal Country (1999), was released as freeware in 2004 but is no longer available on the download page.
- Zero Tolerance (1994), a first person shooter developed by Technopop for Sega Mega Drive/Genesis. The ROMs of the game and its sequel were formerly offered by the owner Randel Reiss for free download. In 2021, however, the rights to both games were purchased by Piko Interactive, leding the download links for the ROMs to disappear from Technopop's website, but they are still available for free download on Zophar's Domain.
- Zork I, Zork II, Zork III, text adventure games by Infocom.
