= MDF =

MDF may refer to:

== Computing ==
- Master Database File, a Microsoft SQL Server file type
- MES Development Framework, a .NET framework for building manufacturing execution system applications
- Message Development Framework, a collection of models, methods and tools used by Health Level 7 v3.0 methodology
- Media Descriptor File, a proprietary disc image file format developed for Alcohol 120%
- Measurement Data Format, one of the data formats defined by the Association for Standardisation of Automation and Measuring Systems (ASAM)
- Multiple Domain Facility; see Logical partition

== Medicine ==
- Map-dot-fingerprint dystrophy, a genetic disease affecting the cornea
- Mean Diastolic Filling of the heart
- Myocardial depressant factor, a low-molecular-weight peptide released from the pancreas into the blood in mammals during various shock states

== Organizations ==
- Hungarian Democratic Forum (Hungarian: Magyar Demokrata Fórum), a political party
- Maraland Democratic Front, a political party in Mizoram, WALES
- Maryland Defense Force, the state defense force of Maryland
- Moscow House of Photography
- Myotonic Dystrophy Foundation, a U.S. non-profit organization related to myotonic dystrophy

== Telecommunication ==
- Main distribution frame, a distribution frame where cables are cross-connected in telephony

== Other uses ==
- Made cut did not finish, a golf term
- Market development funds
- Maryland Deathfest
- Moksha language
- Medium-density fibreboard, a type of particle board made of small particles of wood
