= LithTech =

Game engine

- Developer: Monolith Productions
- Stable release: Firebird / 2017; 9 years ago
- Type: Game engine
- License: Proprietary
- Website: www.lith.com

LithTech is a discontinued game engine developed by Monolith Productions and comparable with the Quake and Unreal engines. Monolith and a number of other video game developers have used LithTech as the basis for their first-person shooter games.

Monolith initially developed the engine for Microsoft before purchasing the rights to it and licensing it to other developers via subsidiary LithTech Inc. The licensing company was renamed to Touchdown Entertainment in 2003 and later absorbed into Warner Bros. Interactive Entertainment after its acquisition of Monolith.

The last version of LithTech offered for licensing was Jupiter EX, initially released in 2005, however Monolith has continued to use LithTech technology in their games, including Middle-earth: Shadow of Mordor, released in 2014.

After the release of Middle-earth: Shadow of Mordor, the studio started working on a new engine (based on LithTech technology) for larger-scale battles called "Firebird". LithTech technology has been effectively discontinued with the closure of Monolith Productions on February 25, 2025.

== Versions ==
=== LithTech 1.0 ===
First prototyped as the Raycasting Algorithmic Graphical Engine or RAGE, originally the LithTech engine was supposed to be called DirectEngine, as Monolith was developing it for Microsoft to be included as a 3D engine for use with Microsoft's DirectX technology. When Microsoft decided not to use the engine Monolith bought back the rights to it and continued development on their own. They changed the engine's name to Lithtech and licensed it to other companies. In the following years, the LithTech team was split off into a separate company, LithTech Inc., which was renamed Touchdown Entertainment in March 2003. In 2024 the Monolith website christened this incarnation as V1.

=== LithTech 2.0 ===
Starting with LithTech 2.0, LithTech Inc. began the process of creating many different versions of the engine. Monolith released their game No One Lives Forever (NOLF) featuring this version of the engine, however it was later revised to LithTech 2.2. The game received an upgrade to LithTech 2.2 in a patch release. The LithTech team then continued to improve version 2.2 for its licensees, resulting in the 2.3 and 2.4 iterations.

LithTech cooperated with RealNetworks in developing a custom version of LithTech 2.2 called RealArcade LithTech (or LithTech ESD). Among its features it supported streaming media for in-game billboards/ads, and could be used with RealNetworks' gaming site. At one time, RealArcade LithTech could be licensed by developers if they signed an agreement with RealNetworks. In 2024 the Monolith website christened this incarnation as V2, and seemingly lumps in Talon.

=== LithTech Talon ===
LithTech Inc. developed a different engine specifically for Monolith's title, Aliens versus Predator 2. LithTech Talon was based on LithTech 2.2, rather than LithTech 2.4. Because of this choice, LithTech 2.4, RealArcade LithTech, and LithTech Talon became largely incompatible with each other. However, reviewers still thought of it as inferior to Unreal or id Tech.

LithTech Talon's biggest selling point lay in its capable multiplayer support, more efficient when compared to prior versions of LithTech multiplayer that featured poor networking code. Aliens versus Predator 2 features comprehensive multiplayer gameplay utilizing these improvements.

By 2003, Talon was still being licensed.

=== LithTech 3.0 ===
LithTech 3.0 was being developed concurrently with Talon, but, along with its revisions, LithTech 3.x would largely be considered an internal version of the engine. While it was sent to licensees, no games were finished on it. The primary feature announced for LithTech 3.x was the Distributed Object System, a new system for MMORPGs and multiplayer. Unfortunately, LithTech 3.x was also plagued by a significant number of bugs and problems and all games developed with LithTech 3.x would eventually convert to the newer LithTech Jupiter or to Talon.

The unreleased Monolith game Shogo II was being developed with this iteration of the LithTech engine.

=== LithTech Discovery ===
LithTech Discovery was created with the MMORPG genre and its unique requirements in mind. Discovery improved upon the working technology from LithTech 2.2, but also included the Distributed Object System which was the centerpiece of LithTech 3.x.

=== LithTech Jupiter ===
LithTech Jupiter was a thorough overhaul of the LithTech technology, developed as an alternative to 3.x. In some ways, the original version of Jupiter was even more technologically advanced than its competitors, since it supported Shader Model 1.x and included a visualization tool, whereas at the time Unreal and Quake only supported CPU-based shaders.

A custom version of Jupiter was made especially for Monolith; this release was codenamed LithTech Triton. Eventually, LithTech Triton's new features were merged back into LithTech Jupiter for licensees. In 2024 the Monolith website christened this incarnation as V3, with no mention of 3.0 or Discovery.

=== LithTech Jupiter EX ===
As of 2005 the latest public iteration of the LithTech engine was Jupiter Extended (or Jupiter EX), which was featured in F.E.A.R. and Condemned: Criminal Origins, both developed by Monolith. Compared to its precursor Jupiter, the Extended version was driven by a new DirectX 9 renderer and other advancements, including the addition of Havok physics software for improved real-world physics simulation, dynamic per-pixel lighting, bump mapping, normal mapping, and specular highlighting. Along with Havok's character dynamics, Jupiter EX also includes the "Havok Vehicle Kit", which adds support for common vehicle behavior. In 2024 the Monolith website christened this incarnation as V4 for the initial releases, and V5 for F.E.A.R. 2: Project Origin and Condemned 2: Bloodshot.

=== LithTech Firebird ===
Firebird was created with purpose of larger-scale battles and the expansion of the Nemesis system for Middle-earth: Shadow of War. In 2024 the Monolith website christened this incarnation as V7, with the engine used in Middle-Earth: Shadow of Mordor titled V6.

== Games using LithTech ==
The following is a partial list of video games built with the LithTech engine, arranged by the version of LithTech used.

=== 1.0 ===
- Shogo: Mobile Armor Division by Monolith Productions (1998)
- Blood II: The Chosen by Monolith Productions (1998)

A "Claw 3D" was prototyped on the engine.

=== 1.5 ===
This is the version of the engine used in the development of the LithTech Film Producer machinima tool by Strange Company, most notably used in their short film Ozymandias. Later development switched over to LithTech 2.0 however.

=== 2.0 and 2.2 ===
- No One Lives Forever by Monolith Productions (2000)
- Sanity: Aiken's Artifact by Monolith Productions (2000)
- Legends of Might and Magic by New World Computing (2001)

=== Talon ===
- Aliens versus Predator 2 by Monolith Productions and Third Law Interactive (2001)
- Purge by Tri-Synergy (2002)
- Western Outlaw: Wanted Dead or Alive by Jarhead Games (2003)

=== Jupiter ===
- No One Lives Forever 2: A Spy In H.A.R.M.'s Way by Monolith Productions (2002)
- Tron 2.0 (LithTech Triton) by Monolith Productions (2003)

=== Jupiter EX ===
- F.E.A.R. by Monolith Productions (2005)
- Condemned: Criminal Origins by Monolith Productions (2005)
- Condemned 2: Bloodshot by Monolith Productions (2008)
- F.E.A.R. 2: Project Origin by Monolith Productions (2009)
- Middle-earth: Shadow of Mordor by Monolith Productions (2014) (Modified Lithtech Jupiter)

The cancelled Batman game "Project Apollo" was also being developed on the engine, later re-worked into Shadow of Mordor.

=== Firebird ===
- Middle-earth: Shadow of War by Monolith Productions (2017)

=== Unknown version ===
- Might and Magic IX by New World Computing (2002)
