= Shogo: Mobile Armor Division =

1998 video game

- Developers: Monolith Productions; Hyperion Entertainment (Amiga)
- Publishers: NA: Monolith Productions; EU: Microïds; Titan Computer (ports)
- Producer: John L. Jack
- Designer: Craig Hubbard
- Programmer: Kevin Stephens
- Composers: Guy Whitmore; Daniel Bernstein
- Engine: LithTech 1.0
- Platforms: Windows, Mac OS, WarpOS, Linux
- Release: Windows: NA: October 15, 1998; EU: 1998; Macintosh: NA: December 21, 2000; EU: December 2000; Linux: EU: February 2001; Amiga; May 2001
- Genre: First-person shooter
- Modes: Single-player, multiplayer

Shogo: Mobile Armor Division is a first-person shooter video game developed by Monolith Productions and published by Monolith and Interplay Entertainment in 1998. The game features on-foot first-person shooter action, and combat with anime-style bipedal mechs. Shogo is a combat system that features the possibility of critical hits, whereby attacking an enemy will occasionally bring about a health bonus for the player. Players take on the role of Sanjuro Makabe, a Mobile Combat Armor (MCA) pilot and a commander in the United Corporate Authority (UCA) army, during a brutal war for the planet Cronus and its precious liquid reactant, kato. Players must locate and assassinate a rebel leader known only as Gabriel. At two pivotal points in the game, the player also has the opportunity to make a crucial decision, which can alter the game's ending.

Shogo was initially known as Riot: Mobile Armor, and it is heavily influenced by Japanese animation, particularly Patlabor and Appleseed, and the real robot mecha genre. It is the first game to use the LithTech game engine. The game was received positively by critics, and it shipped 100,000 units of the game to retailers in the game's debut week. It underperformed commercially, selling roughly 20,000 units in the United States during 1998's Christmas shopping season. Despite this, Shogo's critical success led to Monolith's development of a later game, The Operative: No One Lives Forever. Shogo was ported to the Amiga PowerPC platform in 2001 by Hyperion Entertainment. Hyperion also made the Macintosh port and the Linux port of Shogo.

== Gameplay ==
Shogo features a mix of both standard on-foot first person shooter action, and combat with anime-style bipedal mechs. Unlike mech simulator games such as the MechWarrior series, the mechs in Shogo are controlled essentially the same as in first-person shooter games.

An inherent feature of the combat system in Shogo is the possibility of critical hits, whereby attacking an enemy will occasionally bring about a health bonus for the player while the enemy in question loses more health than usual from the weapon used. However, enemy characters are also capable of scoring critical hits on the player.

== Plot ==
The game revolves around the struggle to secure reserves of "kato", an energy source that makes interstellar travel possible. Players take the role of Sanjuro Makabe, a Mobile Combat Armor (MCA) pilot and a commander in the United Corporate Authority (UCA) army, during a brutal war for the planet Cronus.Originally intended as a joint venture that would ensure the continued profitability of the three organizations that founded it, the UCA is now independent, and the dominant military power in existence. Most of the game takes place on Planet Cronus or the spaceship Leviathan.

Players must locate and assassinate a rebel leader known as Gabriel, who leads the terrorist group known as The Fallen. Prior to the game's first level, Sanjuro had lost his brother, Toshiro; his best friend, Baku; and his girlfriend, Kura, during the war. He is now driven by revenge and his romantic relationship with Kathryn, Kura's sister; in Sanjuro's words, "It's kinda complicated."

At two pivotal points in the game, the player also has the opportunity to make a crucial decision, which can alter the game's ending. While the first decision is almost purely a narrative decision, the second decision actually determines who the player will be facing the rest of the game and how the game will end.

== Development and release ==
Shogo was originally known as Riot: Mobile Armor. It has heavy influences from Japanese animation, particularly Patlabor and Appleseed and the real robot mecha genre. The game runs on a proprietary engine known as LithTech.

The game's lead designer Craig Hubbard expressed that Shogo "(although critically successful) fell embarrassingly short of [the team's] original design goals", and "it is a grim reminder of the perils of wild optimism and unchecked ambition" exercised by the relatively small development team. According to Hubbard, "The whole project was characterized by challenges. We had issues with planning, prioritization, ambition, scope, staffing, inexperience (including my own), and just about everything that can go wrong on a project. I think what saved the game was that we realized about six months before our ship date that there was no way we could make the game great, so we just focused on making it fun." This involved the team putting "all [their] energy in making the weapons really fun to use."

A later game developed by Monolith ended up becoming The Operative: No One Lives Forever, released in 2000. During the development of that game, it took a long time for Monolith to find a publishing partner. According to Hubbard, during this time, the game that became No One Lives Forever "mutated constantly in order to please prospective producers and marketing departments. The game actually started off as a mission-based, anime-inspired, paramilitary action thriller intended as a spiritual sequel to Shogo and ended up as a 60s spy adventure in the tradition of Our Man Flint and countless other 60s spy movies and shows." (Parts of the initial "paramilitary action thriller" concept evolved into F.E.A.R., another Monolith game, released after the No One Lives Forever series, in 2005.)

=== Cancelled expansion packs ===
The expansion pack Shugotenshi would have given more insight into Kura's roles. It would have been six or eight levels of Kura fighting and coming to terms with the death of Hank. Some features of that game would have been various body armor for Kura and new enemies and weapons for her.

Legacy of the Fallen would have moved away from the fighting of Cronus and taken the player to the remote kato mining facility at Iota-33. It would just show how well organized the Fallen actually were and the weapon capabilities of an Ambed (Advanced Mechanical Biological Engineering Division) team. Legacy of the Fallen was to have an entirely new cast of characters, five new mecha to choose from, six new on foot weapons, five new mecha weapons, several new enemy aliens, and levels that played out more like Half-Life's levels in structure. Legacy of the Fallen was cancelled in March 1999.

=== Ports ===
Shogo was ported to the Amiga PowerPC platform in 2001 by Hyperion Entertainment. Hyperion also made the Macintosh and Linux ports of Shogo. The game had not sold as well as had hoped, most notably on Linux, despite becoming a bestseller on Tux Games. Hyperion has put some of the blame on its publisher Titan Computer and because Linux users were likely to dual boot with Windows. A version for BeOS was also in development in 1999 by Be Inc. and Wildcard Design.

== Reception ==
=== Reviews ===
Reception

Aggregate score
Aggregator	Score
Metacritic	88/100

Review scores
Publication	Score
AllGame	4.5/5
CNET Gamecenter	8/10
Computer Games Strategy Plus	4/5
Computer Gaming World	3.5/5
Edge	7/10
Game Informer	8/10
GamePro	4.5/5
GameRevolution	A−
GameSpot	8.1/10
IGN	9/10
Next Generation	4/5
PC Accelerator	8/10
PC Gamer (US)	90%
The Cincinnati Enquirer	3/4

The game received "favorable" reviews, two points shy of "universal acclaim", according to the review aggregation website Metacritic. Next Generation said, "Obviously there are a lot of alternatives in this market, with Half-Life and SiN releasing at the same time, but Shogo has clear merits and stands up on its own. It's an excellent game and it will be a fine contender."

=== Sales ===
Monolith shipped 100,000 units of the game to retailers in the game's debut week, following its launch in early November 1998. However, the game underperformed commercially. It sold roughly 20,000 units in the United States during 1998's Christmas shopping season, a figure that Mark Asher of CNET Gamecenter called "disappointing". Combined with the failure of competitors SiN and Blood II: The Chosen, these numbers led him to speculate that the first-person shooter genre's market size was smaller than commonly believed, as the "only FPS game that has done really well [over the period] is Half-Life." Shogo's low sales resulted in the cancellation of its planned expansion pack.

Analyzing Shogo's performance in his 2003 book Games That Sell!, Mark H. Walker argued that it "never sold as well as it should have" because of Monolith's status as a small publisher. Shelf space for games was allotted based on a market development fund (MDF) system at the time: major retailers charged fees for advertising and endcap shelving, which publishers were required to pay before a game would be stocked. Because larger publishers could afford greater MDF spending than Monolith, Walker believed that Shogo "just couldn't get widespread distribution" in mainstream retail stores compared to its competitors.
