= Gruntz =

1999 video game

- Developer: Monolith Productions
- Publisher: Monolith Productions
- Producer: Chris Hewett
- Designers: Kevin Lambert; Nicholas Newhard; Chris Hewett
- Programmer: Kevin Lambert
- Artist: Paul Renault
- Writers: Kevin Lambert; Paul Renault
- Composer: Guy Whitmore
- Engine: Windows Animation Package 32
- Platform: Windows
- Release: NA: March 25, 1999
- Genres: Strategy, puzzle
- Modes: Single-player, multiplayer

Gruntz is a puzzle/strategy game for PC, developed and published in February 1999 by Monolith Productions. It is packaged with a level editor and can be played in single and multiplayer modes.

The game received mostly average to very positive reviews from critics.

== Gameplay ==
Gameplay screenshot

The player controls a number of "Gruntz", diminutive, goblinoid creatures made of baked clay ("goo"), via the mouse. The controls are those of a typical real-time strategy game: commands are issued to Gruntz via first selecting them and then either right-clicking (causing them to move or attack) or left-clicking (for special actions such as laying bombs or digging holes).

Tools are to be picked up by Gruntz to use in battle or for puzzle solving purposes. Each tool does a certain amount of damage. The weakest tool is nothing at all, also called barehands. There are several ways of getting a barehand Grunt, which include freshly created Gruntz, or a Boomerang Grunt that forgot to catch the boomerang. The only Grunt a Barehanded can defeat is another bare hand if he strikes first. The strongest weapon is the Timebombs, which kills any Gruntz within the 1 square radius (including the Grunt himself if he's not careful). Most weapons can be used for other purposes, such as walking over spikes, swimming, breaking objects or digging holes. A grunt can only have one tool at a time.

In addition to tools, toys can be used against enemy Gruntz to force them to stop and play with the toy for a given amount of time, while the player sneaks past them. As with tools, there are numerous toys available for use. The shortest lasting toy is the yo-yo, which breaks almost instantly, leaving the Grunt little time to do anything but run away. The longest lasting toy is the Beach Ball, which take the longest to break. The only thing that works as well as a Beach Ball is the Go-Kart, which doesn't last quite as long in information terms, but the animation of the toy actually breaking is quite long, making the Go-Kart last as long as the Beach Ball. Just like tools, a Grunt can only have one Toy at a time, but he can always put his current toy down and get another one, use that toy, and return later to collect the original toy.

Powerups are collected in the same way as tools or toys, but the difference (apart from the red sparkles) is that they only last for a limited time. Most powerups will just enhance a Gruntz abilities, such as boosting his health, increasing his speed, or defending him from harm, but two of the powerups (Deathtouch and Conversion) have effects on different things. Deathtouch is a temporary tool that gives the grunt a short-range one hit kill attack that requires no recharge time like tools do, for as long as the Powerup lasts. Conversion allows a Grunt to convert any other Grunt for the rest of the game, but the converter's health continually goes down until he dies, although converting another grunt will restore health.

There are two playing modes in Gruntz, Quests and battles. A quest is where the player has to puzzle out how to get a grunt to the Warpstone, and then bring that Grunt to the King. In battles, there are 2 to 4 players. The players can be either human or computer controlled. The objective is to defeat the opponents by getting a Grunt into their fort, using a variety of different weapons. The game ends when there is one player left (or all the human players have resigned).

The game still garners some interest with the gaming community due to the level editor, which allows for the creation of new maps and puzzles, and quests.
