= Sanity: Aiken's Artifact =

2000 action video game

- Developer: Monolith Productions
- Publisher: Fox Interactive
- Producers: Gary Sheinwald; Derek Fialho
- Designers: Kevin Lambert; Garrett Price
- Programmers: Toby Gladwell; Brad Pendleton
- Artist: Matthew Allen
- Writers: Kevin Lambert; Garrett Price
- Composer: Guy Whitmore
- Engine: LithTech 2.0
- Platform: Microsoft Windows
- Release: NA: September 22, 2000; EU: November 3, 2000
- Genre: Action
- Modes: Single-player, multiplayer

Sanity: Aiken's Artifact is a 2000 action game developed by Monolith Productions and published by Fox Interactive for Microsoft Windows. Played from a three-dimensional isometric perspective, the game follows Nathaniel Cain, an agent of the Department of National Psionic Control, as he investigates a conspiracy involving genetically engineered humans with psychic abilities. Cain was voiced by rapper and actor Ice-T, in his first major video game role.

The game combines combat and environmental puzzles with a system of collectible psychic powers called Talents. Talents are represented by cards, divided into themed groups called Totems, and used at the cost of Cain's Sanity energy. Monolith subsequently distributed additional multiplayer Talents through booster packs, borrowing elements from collectible card games.

Development began from a concept by Monolith designer Aaron St. John for a card-based duelling game. Garrett Price and Kevin Lambert subsequently developed its narrative and gameplay, while the studio used technology developed for the LithTech 2.0 engine. Fox Interactive became involved late in production as part of a publishing arrangement that also included The Operative: No One Lives Forever. A planned Dreamcast version was cancelled shortly before the Windows release.

Sanity: Aiken's Artifact received mixed or average reviews. Critics generally praised its unusual Talent system, visual effects, variety of psychic powers, and mixture of combat and puzzles, but criticised its camera, controls, loading times, repetitive encounters, and limited multiplayer component.

== Gameplay ==
Cain navigating an environmental puzzle from the game's isometric perspective

Sanity: Aiken's Artifact is an action game with puzzle and light role-playing elements. The player controls Cain through three-dimensional environments viewed from an elevated isometric perspective. The camera can be rotated or zoomed, although movement is primarily directed by pointing and clicking with the mouse. The single-player campaign contains 20 levels and alternates between combat, exploration, and environmental puzzles.

Although Cain carries a pistol with unlimited ammunition, combat primarily revolves around psychic abilities called Talents. Each Talent produces a different offensive, defensive, or utility effect. Offensive Talents include projectile and area-of-effect attacks, while defensive abilities can shield Cain or impair opponents. Other Talents are used for environmental interaction and puzzle solving, including moving or levitating objects.

Using a Talent drains points from Cain's Sanity meter. Talents are represented as collectible cards and are arranged into themed categories called Totems, including Fire, Sun, Illusion, Science, Demonology, and Death. Cain acquires cards while progressing through the campaign and can select which available Talents to equip. The single-player campaign contains 80 collectible Talents.

The multiplayer component supports competitive matches in which players use Talents against one another. The release version concentrates on deathmatch play and includes a separate collection of multiplayer cards and maps. Monolith intended the booster-pack system to extend this component by allowing players to add further abilities to their available selections.

== Plot ==
In the near future, geneticist Joan Aiken develops a serum capable of unlocking psychic abilities known as Talents. Because the treatment can be administered successfully only before birth, Aiken establishes the Children of Tomorrow project and uses the serum on unborn children. The resulting psychics, known as Psionics, are able to manipulate energy and matter but risk losing their mental stability through excessive use of their powers.

Two of the earliest Children of Tomorrow are the twin brothers Cain and Abel. Cain eventually joins the Department of National Psionic Control, a government agency responsible for policing criminal Psionics, while Abel becomes a fugitive. Each powerful Psionic is associated with a group of abilities called a Totem; Cain specialises in the Fire Totem and Abel in the Storm Totem.

At the beginning of the game, Cain is returning from a suspension imposed after he injured civilians during a confrontation with Priscilla Divine. Divine leads the Eye of Ra, an organisation that opposes the Children of Tomorrow project on ethical grounds. The department reinstates Cain and instructs him to infiltrate the Eye of Ra's headquarters, which operates under the cover of a psychic telephone service. Cain confronts Divine, who warns him about a figure named Golgotham before she dies.

Cain subsequently encounters Bobby, a younger psychic being protected by the department. Abel breaks into the facility and attempts to abduct Bobby, but Cain prevents him from doing so. Cain is then assigned to investigate the theft of an experimental version of Aiken's serum. His investigation takes him to magician Adrian Starr, the founder of the Illusion Totem, whom Cain initially suspects of involvement in the theft.

Cain eventually discovers that Starr is not responsible and that the theft is connected to a broader conspiracy involving Golgotham. As Cain investigates the founders of the different Totems, he encounters Joan Aiken and learns more about the Children of Tomorrow project and his own origins. He also confronts Elijah Krebspawn, a practitioner of the Demonology Totem whose experiments are connected to Golgotham's plans.

Golgotham seeks to recover a supernatural artefact and use it to summon the Sanity Devourer, a creature capable of consuming the world. Cain pursues Golgotham and his followers while gathering the powers of the different Totems. In the final confrontation, Cain prevents the summoning from being completed and defeats the forces threatening the surviving Psionics.

== Development ==
=== Design and technology ===
The original concept for Sanity: Aiken's Artifact was created by Monolith designer Aaron St. John. According to Monolith co-founder Garrett Price, St. John proposed a game inspired by contemporary collectible card games in which players would duel using different psychic abilities. Price and designer Kevin Lambert subsequently took responsibility for developing the concept into a complete game.

Price concentrated on the story and characters, while Lambert designed the gameplay and worked with the level designers. The initial concept of psychic agents hunting other psychics was influenced by stories about people with abnormal mental abilities. The designers developed Cain as an agent investigating a series of apparently separate threats that gradually reveal a larger conspiracy involving Golgotham and the Sanity Devourer.

Monolith developed the game with LithTech 2.0, a version of its proprietary engine that was also being created for The Operative: No One Lives Forever. Programmer Toby Gladwell created an effects-editing tool called FXEdit during production. The tool allowed artists to construct visual effects through a graphical interface rather than configuring them exclusively through text files. Art lead Matthew Allen used the system to combine animated models, sprites, and particle effects for the game's psychic powers and creatures.

The Talent system remained central to the project throughout development. Individual cards were designed around different psychic effects and organised into Totems, giving the collectible-card concept a role in both the narrative and gameplay. The developers also designed Talents to produce elaborate visual effects, distinguishing the different abilities even when they served similar combat functions.

=== Casting and music ===
British voice actor David Scully originally recorded Cain's dialogue. By the time Fox Interactive became involved, most of the game and its voice recording had already been completed. Fox producer Gary Sheinwald nevertheless wanted a recognisable performer for the protagonist and a theme song that could be used to market the game.

Sheinwald initially considered rapper Ice Cube, who was unavailable or uninterested. Fox tester Kim Nazel, also known as Arabian Prince of N.W.A, suggested Ice-T instead. Ice-T agreed to replace Scully as Cain, requiring the protagonist's dialogue to be recorded again. Ice-T and his band Body Count also contributed the song "Sanity", which was used in the game and its promotional trailer.

Artists originally designed Cain with clothing resembling a firefighter's turnout coat, reflecting his association with the Fire Totem. The introduction of Ice-T affected the game's marketing and gave Fox a recognisable performer with whom to promote the project.

The game was initially titled simply Sanity. According to Sheinwald, an Australian retail chain challenged Fox Interactive's attempt to register the title as a trademark, leading the publisher to add the subtitle Aiken's Artifact.

=== Publishing and release ===
Monolith initially developed the project without an external publisher. Fox Interactive acquired it when it entered into a publishing arrangement with Monolith that also included The Operative: No One Lives Forever. Sheinwald recalled that Sanity was already at an advanced stage, possibly alpha or beta, when it was presented to Fox.

Fox Interactive formally announced versions for Windows and the Dreamcast at E3 2000. Contemporary reports initially placed the game within Fox's late-summer 2000 release schedule.

The Windows version reached North American stores on September 22, 2000. The European edition was released under the shortened title Aiken's Artifact.

The Dreamcast version was cancelled before release. IGN reported in September 2000 that Fox Interactive had removed it from the company's release schedule, leaving the Windows edition as the only released version.

=== Talent packs ===
Monolith and Fox planned to extend the collectible-card concept beyond the content included on the game disc. Additional Talents were distributed in booster packs through Monolith's website, magazine discs, preorder promotions, and other releases. Some packs were made available for purchase, while others were distributed without charge.

The Talent packs were principally associated with multiplayer and were intended to reproduce some of the appeal of collecting and exchanging cards. Contemporary reviewers considered the concept unusual, but questioned whether the game's limited deathmatch mode provided sufficient incentive to purchase additional cards.

== Reception ==
Reception

Aggregate score
| Aggregator | Score |
|---|---|
| Metacritic | 73/100 |

Review scores
| Publication | Score |
|---|---|
| AllGame | 4/5 stars |
| CNET Gamecenter | 6/10 |
| Computer Games Strategy Plus | 3/5 stars |
| Computer Gaming World | 2.5/5 stars |
| Edge | 5/10 |
| Game Informer | 5.25/10 |
| GamePro | 3.5/5 stars |
| GameSpot | 6.6/10 |
| GameSpy | 83% |
| GameZone | 8.4/10 |
| IGN | 8.3/10 |
| Next Generation | 3/5 stars |
| PC Gamer (US) | 81% |

According to Metacritic, Sanity: Aiken's Artifact received "mixed or average" reviews, with an aggregate score of 73 out of 100 based on 20 reviews. Critical response varied considerably, with reviewers generally regarding the Talent system as the game's distinguishing feature while disagreeing over whether the surrounding combat, puzzles, and narrative sustained the experience.

The range and presentation of the Talents received particular praise. Erik Wolpaw of GameSpot described the abilities as the game's best feature and wrote that the prospect of finding another Talent remained an incentive even during its more frustrating sections. He also praised the visual distinction between the abilities and the quality of the lighting and environmental detail. Jonathan Wu of GameSpy considered the game one of the year's more original releases and praised the variety created by acquiring and experimenting with new powers.

Reviewers were divided over the puzzles and level design. GameSpot found the combination of combat and puzzle solving generally successful and praised some set pieces, including a game-show sequence, but criticised objectives based on retrieving an item and returning it to another location. Jim Preston of NextGen wrote that the game began colourfully and enjoyably but gradually became routine. Other reviewers similarly found that the repeated structure of combat encounters, puzzles, and boss battles weakened the novelty of the underlying ability system.

Controls and camera behaviour were frequent points of criticism. GameSpot found the point-and-click movement adequate under ordinary conditions but insufficiently responsive during sequences requiring precise navigation. It also argued that the rotatable three-dimensional camera rarely added anything meaningful to play. Cliff Hicks of Gamecenter criticised the camera and targeting system, writing that the game paired many of its new ideas with corresponding technical or design problems.

The game's loading times were also criticised. Wolpaw reported that restoring a saved game could require lengthy waits, a problem made more apparent in areas where the player was likely to die repeatedly. Boss encounters and the balance of the combat drew additional criticism, with some reviewers finding individual battles predictable or unnecessarily prolonged.

The multiplayer component was less well received than the campaign. GameSpot criticised its reliance on basic deathmatch, small maps, and limited tactical variety, concluding that the mode did not provide a convincing reason to purchase additional Talent packs. Other reviews likewise regarded multiplayer as less substantial than the single-player campaign and questioned its long-term replay value.

Ice-T's performance received a more favourable response. Although Edge awarded the game 5 out of 10, it described the voice acting as being among the best heard in a video game at the time. Retrospective development coverage also identified his casting and the collectible Talent system as two of the project's most distinctive elements.

== Legacy ==
The game was not followed by a sequel, and the cancellation of the Dreamcast edition left Windows as its only released platform. Later coverage has focused on its early attempt to combine an action game with collectible ability cards and separately distributed booster packs, as well as Ice-T's involvement before his later appearances in other video games.

The Talent concept anticipated later uses of unlockable or separately distributed gameplay abilities, although the system was tied primarily to a multiplayer mode that contemporary reviewers considered underdeveloped. Time Extension retrospectively described the project as one of Monolith's more unusual games and documented its origins through interviews with Price, Lambert, Allen, Gladwell, and Sheinwald.
