= F.E.A.R. (video game) =

2005 video game

F.E.A.R. First Encounter Assault Recon
- PC cover art
- Developer: Monolith Productions (Note: Ported to Xbox 360 and PlayStation 3 by Day 1 Studios)
- Publisher: Vivendi Universal Games (Note: Released under the Sierra Entertainment brand name, currently published by Warner Bros. Games)
- Director: Craig Hubbard
- Producers: Rob Loftus; Chris Hewett
- Designer: Craig Hubbard
- Programmers: Brad Pendleton; Kevin Stephens
- Artists: David Longo; Wes Saulsberry
- Writer: Craig Hubbard
- Composer: Nathan Grigg
- Series: F.E.A.R.
- Engine: LithTech Jupiter EX
- Platforms: Windows; Xbox 360; PlayStation 3
- Release: Windows: WW: October 18, 2005; Xbox 360: NA: October 31, 2006; AU: October 31, 2006; EU: November 10, 2006; PlayStation 3: EU: April 20, 2007; NA: April 24, 2007; AU: April 26, 2007
- Genres: First-person shooter, psychological horror
- Modes: Single-player, multiplayer

F.E.A.R. First Encounter Assault Recon is a 2005 first-person shooter psychological horror video game for Windows, PlayStation 3, and Xbox 360. Developed by Monolith Productions and published by Vivendi Universal Games, the Windows version was released worldwide in October 2005. The Xbox and PlayStation versions were ported by Day 1 Studios and released in October 2006 and April 2007, respectively. Two standalone expansion packs were released for the Windows and Xbox 360 versions of the game, both developed by TimeGate Studios; F.E.A.R. Extraction Point (2006) and F.E.A.R. Perseus Mandate (2007). Released on Windows in March 2007, F.E.A.R. Gold Edition includes all the content from the Director's Edition plus Extraction Point, while F.E.A.R. Platinum Collection, released for Windows in November 2007, includes the Director's Edition, Extraction Point, and Perseus Mandate. Neither expansion is now considered canon, as the Monolith-developed F.E.A.R. 2: Project Origin ignores the events of both.

The game's story revolves around the fictional F.E.A.R. (First Encounter Assault Recon) unit, an elite group in the United States Army tasked with investigating supernatural phenomena. When a mysterious paramilitary force infiltrates a multi-billion dollar aerospace compound, taking hostages but issuing no demands, the government responds by sending in a Special Forces team only to have them obliterated. Live footage of the massacre shows an inexplicable wave of destruction tearing the soldiers apart. With no other recourse, the elite F.E.A.R. team is assembled to deal with the extraordinary circumstances. They are given one simple mission: evaluate the threat and eliminate the intruders at any cost. The player takes on the role of the unit's newest recruit, Point Man, a man with a dark past and extremely short reaction time, leading the character through countless firefights and witnessing paranormal manifestations conjured up by a mysterious little girl dressed in red.

Although the atmosphere of the game was heavily influenced by Japanese horror, Monolith's primary goal with F.E.A.R. was to make the player feel like the hero of an action film. To this end, they combined a slow-motion technique called "reflex time", a semi-destructible environment, and a highly detailed particle system in an attempt to create as immersive an environment as possible. Another vital element in this is the game's AI, with Monolith employing a never-before-used technique to give hostile NPCs an unusually broad range of actions in response to what the player is doing. This results in NPCs who can also work as a team, such as performing flanking maneuvers, laying down suppressive fire, and attempting to retreat when under heavy fire.

Upon its initial Windows release, F.E.A.R. was very well received, with the AI garnering particular praise. Critics also lauded the graphics, atmosphere, sound design, music, and combat mechanics. Common points of criticism were a lack of enemy variety, a weak plot, and repetitive level design. The Xbox 360 version was also well received, but the PlayStation 3 version met with mixed reviews, with many critics unimpressed with the port's technical issues and graphical inferiority. It was a commercial success, selling over three million units worldwide across all three systems.

== Gameplay ==
F.E.A.R. is a first-person shooter in which the player's arsenal includes handguns (which the player can dual wield), an assault rifle, submachine gun, shotgun, sniper rifle, nail gun, repeating cannon, rocket launcher, and particle beam. Each weapon differs in terms of accuracy, range, rate of fire, damage, and weight. The latter characteristic is important, as the more powerful weapons (rocket launcher, cannon, and particle beam) tend to be more cumbersome and slow the player's movement and reaction speed. Only three different firearms can be carried at any one time. The player also has access to three different types of explosive – frag grenades, proximity grenades, and remote bombs. The player can carry five of each type and can carry all three at once (allowing for up to 15 explosives), but only one type may be equipped at any one time. Additionally, when using the remote bombs, the player must holster their weapon.

Compared to other shooters where melee combat is often a last resort, F.E.A.R.'s melee system is a viable combat alternative. The butts of all firearms can be used in close combat; lighter weapons, although less powerful, allow the player to move around more quickly and increase the chances of a successful melee attack. Movement speed is maximized if a player holsters their weapon, which allows them to engage in hand-to-hand combat. As well as the basic melee attack, players can also perform a jumping kick and a sliding tackle, both of which, if landed correctly, instantly kill regular enemies.

Point Man uses reflex time in the PC version of the game. Note the visual distortions representing the bullet trails.

A prominent gameplay element in F.E.A.R. is "reflex time"; an ability which slows down the game world while still allowing the player to aim and react at normal speeds. This effect is used to simulate the player character's superhuman reflexes, and is represented by stylized visual effects, such as bullets in flight that cause air distortion or interact with the game's particle system. The duration which reflex time lasts is limited, determined by a meter which slowly fills up automatically when the ability is not being used. The player can permanently increase the size of the reflex meter by picking up reflex boosters. Other pickups available during the game include medkits (of which the player can store ten), protective armor (reduces the amount of damage the player takes during combat), and health boosters (permanently increase the player's health meter).

Reflex time is an important element of the game's combat mechanics insofar as F.E.A.R.'s artificial intelligence allows hostile NPCs an unusually large range of action; enemies can duck to travel under crawlspaces, jump through windows, vault over railings, climb ladders, and push over large objects to create cover, all in reaction to what the player is doing at any given moment. Various opponents may also act as a team, taking back routes to flank the player, using suppressive fire, taking cover and often falling back if under fire, alerting one another as to the player's location, and giving one another orders (which may, or may not, be followed).

=== Multiplayer ===
The game's multiplayer can support up to 16 players, and initially featured deathmatch, team deathmatch, elimination, team elimination, and capture the flag. "Control" and "Conquer All" games were added later as free downloadable content. Also added at a later date were game types specifically designed to allow players to use reflex time; SlowMo deathmatch, team SlowMo deathmatch, and SlowMo capture the flag. These game types feature a reflex time power-up, which only one player can carry at a time, and when it is fully charged (it charges when it is being carried) that player can activate it and give themselves (and the rest of their team, if applicable) a considerable speed advantage over opposing players. However, whoever is carrying the power-up will have a bluish glow and will be permanently visible on all players' mini-maps. The Xbox 360 and PlayStation 3 versions of the game feature the same modes as the PC version (with both "Control" and "Conquer All" added after release). Multiple new maps were made available for the Xbox 360 version throughout 2007, with the release of three major map packs; Nightmare, Synchronicity, and Bonus.

In August 2006, F.E.A.R.'s multiplayer component was re-released on PC as a free download under the name F.E.A.R. Combat. Incorporating the latest multiplayer patches, all ten gameplay modes, and all nineteen maps, F.E.A.R. Combat was compatible with the original PC retail edition's multiplayer, meaning those with only the download could play with those who own the full game.

== Plot ==
In 2002, the elite United States Army unit F.E.A.R. (First Encounter Assault Recon) was founded to "combat paranormal threats to national security". The game is set in 2025 in the fictional city of Fairport and begins as the unit is joined by a newly assigned Sergeant (referred to only as Point Man). At a facility owned by Armacham Technology Corporation (ATC), a psychic operative named Paxton Fettel has gone rogue. Officially an aerospace manufacturer and medical research company, in reality, ATC are a hugely powerful private military company dabbling in cryogenics, nuclear technology, cloning, and telepathy. They were attempting to develop a unit of telepathically controlled clone soldiers (known as Replicas), and Fettel was their commander. However, he has now used the Replicas to seize control of the facility. (Note: Fettel's capture of the facility is expanded upon in the F.E.A.R. comic.) The mission of the three-person F.E.A.R. team (Point Man, LT. Spencer Jankowski, and technical officer Jin Sun-Kwon) is to eliminate Fettel, which will automatically shut down the Replicas.

As the mission progresses, Jankowski disappears and Point Man begins to have powerful hallucinations, implying that he has a deeper connection to Fettel. Point Man witnesses Fettel interrogating a worker, and later finds the mutilated worker who mentions a girl named "Alma" before dying. Despite being unable to locate Jankowski, F.E.A.R. is redeployed to ATC headquarters, where a Delta Force recon team has dropped out of contact.

Point Man learns that Fettel's brain waves during his revolt were identical to those during the "first synchronicity event", which happened when he was ten and resulted in the termination of "Project Origin". This time, however, Fettel is infinitely more dangerous. Meanwhile, Point Man finds that the Delta recon team have been massacred. (Note: The demise of the Delta Force recon team is depicted in the bonus mission for the PlayStation 3 port of the game, which shows them fighting their way through Replicas to the building's lobby. Once there, they lose contact with the outside, and the girl in the red dress emerges from an elevator, brutally wiping them out without laying a finger on them.) He then encounters an ATC survivor, Aldus Bishop, who tells F.E.A.R. that the Replicas were looking for Harlan Wade, a senior ATC researcher. A Delta Force team led by Sgt. Douglas Holiday is sent in to extract Bishop. They get him to a helicopter, but as he is boarding, he is shot by ATC security. (Note: Holiday's attempt to rescue Bishop is depicted in the bonus mission for the Xbox 360 port of the game. Bishop's fate is left ambiguous in both the main game and the bonus mission, but it is confirmed in both Perseus Mandate and the Aramacham Field Guide that he succumbed to his wounds.) Point Man subsequently learns that Fettel was the "second prototype" resulting from Project Origin. Shortly thereafter, Fettel tells Point Man "a war is coming. I've seen it in my dreams. Fires sweeping over the earth. Bodies in the streets. Cities turned to dust. Retaliation."

Point Man subsequently learns that the prototypes were created from the genetic code of a female psychic named Alma, who gave physical birth to both prototypes from within an induced coma. He also learns about the "synchronicity event" – despite being in a coma, Alma formed a telepathic link with Fettel, and began influencing his actions, leading to several deaths. In the Origin facility, Point Man discovers that Alma was only eight when she was brought into Origin, 15 when the first prototype was born, and she is the girl in the red dress. (Note: The live action prequel "Alma Interview" shows some of the interactions between the child Alma and ATC staff.) He also learns that Wade is planning on freeing Alma from stasis in the Origin facility, even though she officially died in 2005. After her death, the facility was sealed until 2025, when it was reopened (over Wade's objections) with an eye to possibly restarting the project. Moments later, Fettel experienced the second synchronicity event. Point Man then has an hallucination in which Fettel tells him that they are brothers, both born of Alma – Point Man is the first prototype. Finding Fettel, he shoots him in the head, rendering the Replicas dormant. He then witnesses Wade, who is revealed to be Alma's father, releasing her from stasis. She immediately kills him, and Point Man heads to the facility's nuclear reactor core, overloading it.

As the facility explodes, Point Man escapes and is picked up by a Delta Force helicopter, on board of which are Holiday and Jin. As it flies over the mushroom cloud, the helicopter loses power, and Alma pulls herself up into the cabin. The game then cuts to black. After the credits, we hear a phone call between an unnamed senator and Genevieve Aristide, president of ATC. She assures him that Project Origin is secure and Fettel has been neutralised. As he complains about how indiscreet the cleanup has been, she points out, "there is some good news, however. The first prototype was a complete success."

== Development ==
=== Conception ===
Although it was known from late 2003 that Monolith Productions was working with Vivendi on a new title, nothing was officially revealed until May 2004, when a single screenshot from the new game was published in Vivendi's weekly newsletter. Written above the picture was, "They say bullets taste like chicken," and written below was, "Hope you're hungry." Vivendi promised that more would be revealed in a few days, at the upcoming E3. F.E.A.R. was formally announced at E3, with the reveal of the game's title, a trailer, a brief plot outline, the genre (first-person shooter), the platform (PC), the release date (fourth quarter of 2005), and the probable rating (M). The following day, a non-playable demo was made available to journalists.

Development had begun with the game tentatively titled Signal. Writer, director, and lead designer Craig Hubbard stated that the game "evolved out of a concept we started developing right after Shogo". Kevin Stephens, Monolith's director of technology and one of the game's lead programmers, later elaborated that the concept was to make the player feel like the hero of an action film. It was this ambition which led to the development of reflex time; Hubbard said he wanted "to make combat as intense as the tea house shootout at the beginning of John Woo's Hard Boiled", and defeating "enemies with style" was crucial to this. In a 2008 interview with IGN promoting F.E.A.R. 2: Project Origin, he explained,

we were setting out to make a really over-the-top John Woo style action movie with the intense combat. Combat is something all shooters have, but we felt that nobody had quite nailed that sense you get in a John Woo movie of just the insanity.

Another key influence was the Wachowskis' The Matrix (1999). In particular, the lobby scene was the team's initial point of reference for how the game's combat should look and feel. With these influences in mind, and wanting to create as immersive an experience as possible, reflex time came to play a key role in the game's combat mechanics.

To further the sense of immersion, Monolith also employed stylistic elements such as a silent, nameless protagonist with an unknown background, and allowing the player to see the protagonist's body when looking down or sideways. Hubbard states, "it was a conscious decision not to give the player an identity. We wanted players to be able to become the protagonist without any reminders that they're supposed to be someone else."

=== Atmosphere ===
As well as its core first-person shooter gameplay, F.E.A.R. is also a psychological horror, and was specifically influenced by Japanese horror, with Stephens citing films such as Hideo Nakata's Ring (1998), the Pang brothers' The Eye (2002), Takashi Shimizu's Ju-On: The Grudge (2002), and Nakata's Dark Water (2002). Hubbard also cites Ring and The Eye as well as Katsuhiro Otomo's Akira (1988), Kim Tae-yong and Min Kyu-dong's Memento Mori (1999), Kiyoshi Kurosawa's Pulse (2001), and Koji Suzuki's 1991 novel Ring (on which Nakata's film was based).

Hubbard has said that his goal with F.E.A.R.'s horror elements was to achieve "a subtle and cerebral type of dread, emphasising suspense and the shadows." Believing that a scare "always works best when you're not expecting it", Monolith attempted to keep the "psychology of the encounter" in the player's mind at all times, in order to "get under [the player's] skin". Thus, they shunned the "in your face 'monsters jumping out of closets' approach". Lead level designer John Mulkey states that "creating expectation and then messing with that expectation is extremely important". Similarly, Hubbard explains that "horror is extremely fragile [...] you can kill it by spelling things out too clearly and you can undermine it with too much ambiguity". With this in mind, he attempted to strike a balance with the narrative elements of F.E.A.R., giving players "enough clues so that [they] can form [their] own theories about what's going on, but ideally [they will] be left with some uncertainty". Speaking to Rock Paper Shotgun in 2013, he reiterated this point; "you want to see something just enough that you can evoke it in your mind and kind of picture it a little bit, but not enough that you can really understand it."

One the game's most iconic moments; as the player turns to descend a ladder, Alma suddenly appears from nowhere, stoically watching the player without moving.

The main source of the game's horror is Alma Wade. In terms of influences, she is often assumed to have been inspired by Samara from The Ring (the American remake of Ring). Hubbard, however, explains that Alma "was born out of a tradition of eerie, faceless female ghosts" and not "as an answer to any specific movie character". Although he does acknowledge that Alma "bears some visual resemblance to the ghosts in Dark Water or Séance", he points out that "creepy little girls have been freaking [him] out since The Shining". Alma was named after Alma Mobley from Peter Straub's novel Ghost Story (1979).

In relation to the game's villain, Paxton Fettel, producer Craig Hewitt has explained that initially there were two villains, but they were ultimately merged. Originally, Fettel was a supporting villain, with the game's main antagonist (aside from Alma) being Conrad Krige. Krige's name was a tribute to actress Alice Krige, who had portrayed Alma Mobley in John Irvin's 1981 adaptation of Straub's novel. Initially, Fettel, Point Man, and Krige were all prototypes, with Point Man and Fettel considered failures. Krige, a perfect soldier, would use Fettel as his interrogator, with Fettel able to consume a person's flesh to learn the truth about any given subject. Hubbard explains that "we ended up consolidating [Fettel and Krige] just because there wasn't enough storytelling real estate."

=== Engine ===
F.E.A.R. was the first game developed using the "Jupiter EX" iteration of LithTech, Monolith's own game engine. Driven by a DirectX 9 renderer, "Jupiter EX" has major advancements over its direct precursor, "Jupiter", and features both Havok physics and the Havok "Vehicle Kit", which adds support for common vehicle behavior (a feature which goes unused in F.E.A.R., as no vehicles appear outside of scripted sequences). Originally, the game opened in the middle of a car chase, which the team had spent two months working on. However, they couldn't get it to work the way they wanted and so they ultimately decided to drop it altogether.

Graphically, F.E.A.R. uses normal mapping, bump mapping, and parallax mapping to give textures a more realistic appearance; the latter is used extensively to give the appearance of depth to flat bullet hole sprites on walls. It also uses volumetric lighting, lightmapping, and a per-pixel lighting model, which allows for complex lighting effects. Vertex, pixel, and high-level shaders are also featured in the game. Cutscenes were built using Havok and Bink Video.

=== AI ===
The game's AI was the culmination of work which Monolith had begun with The Operative: No One Lives Forever (2000) and No One Lives Forever 2: A Spy in H.A.R.M.'s Way (2002). After the release of No One Lives Forever 2, Monolith spent over a year reworking their LithTech graphics engine, which afforded Jeff Orkin, senior AI engineer, enough time to write an entirely new AI system from scratch. In developing the AI routines, his main goal was to try to match the NPCs' intelligence with the player's skill level. According Orkin, "our goal is not to have the players dominated by the AI, but we want them to learn to respect the AI so much that even the easy kills provide a sense of accomplishment."

To accomplish this, F.E.A.R. was the first video game to use "GOAP" (Goal Oriented Action Planning). GOAP is a STRIPS-based architecture that allows NPCs more autonomy than simply reacting to the player. Instead, they decide on a goal from a list of options and plan how best to reach that goal. To do so, the game uses two standard AI components – A* and a Finite-state machine (FSM) – but it uses them in unconventional ways. Usually, the FSM controls all NPC behavior by way of a list of possible states, with A* planning the paths. In F.E.A.R., however, the FSM has only three states ("GoTo", "Animate", and "UseSmartObject"), and A* is used to plan sequences of action as well as to plan paths. In essence, this means that A* navigates the FSM, selects the state, selects when to initiate a state transition, and selects what parameters to fulfil in each state (e.g. it doesn't just initiate a transition into the GoTo state, it also specifies a location and, upon reaching that location, it specifies to transition to the animation state and what animation to play).

The logic determining when to transition from one state to another usually has to be specified manually by a programmer, meaning goals have a hard-coded and unalterable plan. In F.E.A.R., however, GOAP handles this, with the planning system deciding how best to achieve any of the 70 available goals, using any combination of the 120 actions encoded in the game. Orkin explains that "with a planning system, we can just toss in goals and actions. We never have to manually specify the transitions between these behaviors. The AI figures out the dependencies themselves at run-time based on the goal state and the preconditions and effects of actions." This is manifested in the gameplay insofar as,

a character that formulates his own plan to satisfy his goals exhibits less repetitive, predictable behavior and can adapt his actions to custom-fit his current situation. Goals in GOAP are not created with a hard-coded plan. Instead, GOAP simply defines the conditions necessary to satisfy a goal, and the character determines the steps to satisfy this goal in real-time. With this structure, the AI is able to dynamically replan to react to environmental factors. If a situation changes, the NPC recognizes this because the steps planned to accomplish his goal are no longer valid. When a plan becomes invalid, the NPC reassesses the situation and either finds alternate means for accomplishing the goal or activates a different goal.

The AI must make these decisions almost instantly, as GOAP is designed so that each choice is complete by the time the next frame starts. When the AI is searching through the available actions within the state-space, it must constantly reevaluate this process based on what is happening in the game world. To do this, separate sensors are used to gather information, with world-knowledge cached locally so the AI always has information immediately available. Because of this, the AI is constantly changing its plan based upon what the player is doing – if the player throws a grenade, the NPCs will flee; if the player is being very aggressive, they'll be defensive; if the player is hiding, they'll be offensive and try to flush him out. An important part of this is the AI's freedom of movement within the game world. According to Orkin,

the navigation mesh system (NavMesh) lets the NPCs move around the world anywhere that the player can move. Most games use a system of waypoints to move NPCs, but this limits the NPCs' freedom. The NavMesh breaks the map into groups of polygons that are aggregated into triangular paths of possible movement, thus allowing greater flexibility, because the NPCs direct their movement to an area rather than a specific point.

This necessitated a close working relationship between Orkin and lead level designer John Mulkey. Although the navigation mesh allowed NPCs to move to locations, some kind of final mark-up was also necessary within each environment so that the AI "knows" what can be utilised to best achieve its goals; for example, is there a table that can be knocked over and used for cover, a window that can be breached, or a hiding spot that could give them an advantage over the player. As Mulkey and his team began to build the levels, they would make requests for additions to Orkin's AI routines to create new actions unique to certain environments.

In relation to squad behavior, the "AI have goals to respond to orders, and it is up to the AI to prioritize following those orders versus satisfying other goals." Orkin explains,

there's GOAP controlling individual character behaviors, and then there's the squad layer that was dynamically grouping characters into squads and then making decisions on their behalf like, "ok, now is a good time to do an advancing cover where one guy lays suppression fire while two guys move up to cover." There was some modular code that could evaluate whether this was the right time for certain squad behaviors and could then find the participants and send the orders down to them.

When a character seems to respond to a verbal command (for example, when a character is told to flank), what is happening is that the AI has decided to flank the player, reasoning that a flanking manoeuvre is the best way to fulfil its goal. This decision then triggers the nearest character to play the audio "flank", followed by the original character beginning to move to the location, thus making it appear as if the NPC is responding to the command. In actuality, it's the command that is responding to the NPC, but it gives the illusion of verbal orders being followed.

Speaking to AI and Games in 2024, Jeff Orkin said of the AI, "in hindsight, I probably took too many risks, but it worked out okay." Indeed, the game's AI was universally lauded upon the original PC release. It went on to win GameSpot's "2005 Best AI Award", and earned the #2 ranking on AIGameDev's "Most Influential AI Games" in 2007. The GOAP system went on to be used in games such as S.T.A.L.K.E.R.: Shadow of Chernobyl (2007), Just Cause 2 (2010), Transformers: War for Cybertron (2010), F.E.A.R. 3 (2011), and Deus Ex: Human Revolution (2011), as well as subsequent Monolith games, such as Condemned 2: Bloodshot (2008), F.E.A.R. 2: Project Origin (2009), Middle-earth: Shadow of Mordor (2014), and Middle-earth: Shadow of War (2017).

=== Audio and music ===
In keeping with F.E.A.R.'s tonal influences, the sound design and music were designed in the style of Japanese horror films, particularly their tendency to produce tension from ambient sound. The audio engineers used inexpensive equipment to create crude sound effects, employing methods such as dragging metal across different surfaces and recording pump sounds. Composer Nathan Grigg says of the sound design, "sometimes the absence of sound is the best sound. The blank spaces are some of the most disturbing parts of the game. They allow players to fill in the space, which lets their imagination create their own personal horror."

In relation to the music, Grigg acknowledges that "sound and music blurred a little bit." He wanted the score to be "more cerebral and tailored to each individual event", pointing out that "sometimes the music is used to ratchet up the tension to toy with players ... [it] will build to a terrifying crescendo before cutting off without a corresponding event, only to later have the silence shattered by Alma, when players least expect it".

=== Promotion ===
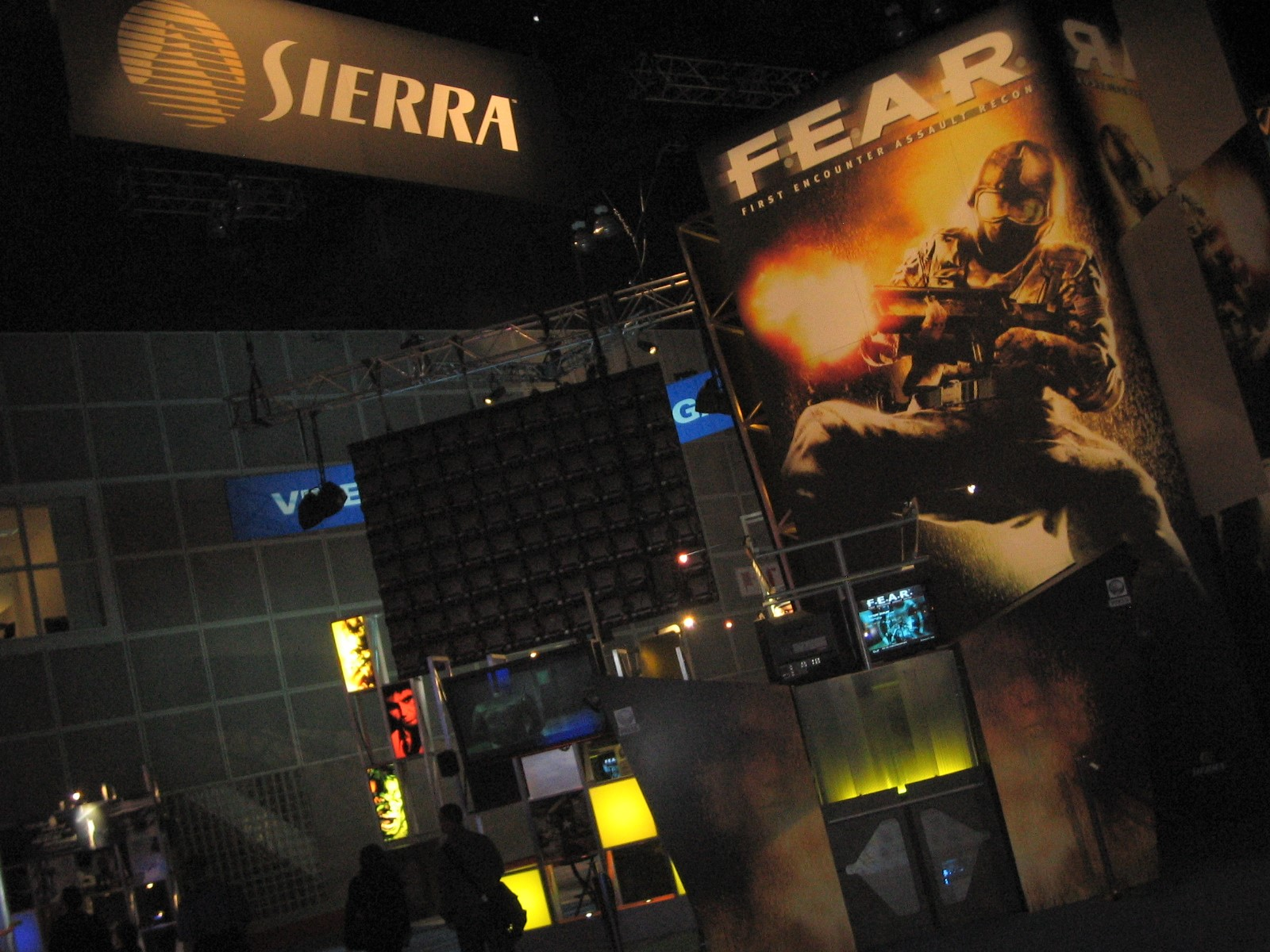
F.E.A.R. at the Electronic Entertainment Expo (E3) in Los Angeles in May 2005

In 2005, F.E.A.R. made playable appearances at the Consumer Electronics Show (CES), the Game Developers Conference (GDC), and E3, all of which were well received. A week after the CES show in January, game journalists were allowed to play the game's multiplayer component for the first time. The game's showing at E3 garnered it the Game Critics Award for "Best Action Game". A single-player demo was released to the public in August. The following week, Vivendi allowed journalists to play through the first four levels of the game, unabridged, which generated even more positive reaction than their previous hands-on experiences. A multiplayer demo was released in September. A week before release, Vivendi had film director John Carpenter attend a number of media events, giving his thoughts on the game, of which he said, it was "as close as I've ever come to playing a movie."

==== P.A.N.I.C.S. ====
In the lead-up to the game's release in October 2005, episodes were released online of a comedy web series created by Rooster Teeth and distributed by BeSeen Communications. P.A.N.I.C.S. (People Acting Normal In Crazy-Ass Situations) is a parody of F.E.A.R., produced primarily by way of the machinima technique of synchronizing footage created by a game engine (in this case, the LithTech Jupiter EX) to pre-recorded dialogue and audio effects. Vivendi commissioned Rooster Teeth and BeSeen to make the series as a viral marketing campaign, with Lori Inman, Vivendi's Senior Brand Manager, stating, "with F.E.A.R. we knew we had a very special title combining a cutting edge FPS engine with a spine-tingling storyline. We liked the idea of creating a humorous viral machinima series that would entertain fans and showcase the spectacular visuals and character animations offered in the game."

The series consists of five episodes, each running between three and four minutes. Four episodes were released in the weeks prior to the game's launch ("Enter Frank" on September 30, "Who Wants the Wing?" on October 1, "The Writing on the Walls" on October 10, and "All Things Must Come to an End......" on October 19). A fifth episode – Episode #0, set moments before "Enter Frank" – was included with F.E.A.R. Director's Edition. The story centers on Frank, a new recruit into Bravo Team, a special military group formed to battle supernatural enemies. As the series begins, Bravo Team has been sent into a military facility to investigate reports of paranormal activity. As team members start dying in horrific fashion, Frank is incredulous to learn his teammates don't believe in the paranormal and keep coming up with increasingly ridiculous explanations for what is happening.

==== Alma Interview and comic ====
Included with the Director's Edition of the game were the Alma Interview prequel and the Dark Horse comic prequel.

"Alma Interview" is a series of four snippets from an interview between ATC employee Dr. Green and the seven-year-old Alma in the lead-up to her being placed in Project Origin. In the first clip, as Wade observes from behind a one-way mirror, Green tries to strike up a rapport with Alma by telling her about her own daughter and telling her she's pretty, but Alma refuses to speak. In the second clip, Green is distracted by a voice seemingly coming from a vent, and when she turns around, Alma disappears. Green sees Alma's reflection in the mirror, and when she turns around again, Alma is back in the room. In the third clip, Green tries threatening Alma, telling her that if she doesn't cooperate, she will be placed back in her cell. Alma responds by telepathically forcing Green to draw a disturbing picture of a child surrounded by blackness. In the fourth clip, Alma asks Green, "do you like to play games?" When Green says no, Alma says, "I have a game", and Green finds herself suddenly trapped in a vent. When she just as quickly finds herself back in the room, she demands that Wade let her out, but he ignores her. Alma then asks Green, "Who are they? I see them when I close my eyes. They say they know you. They say you made them. They say you're going to kill me." As a terrified Green tries frantically to open the door, Alma dances around her, before sitting back down. In the observation room, Wade doesn't react to anything he sees.

Written by Alden Freewater with art by Edwin David, the Dark Horse comic takes place moments before the game begins and expands on the game's opening cutscene. At ATC headquarters, as Alma telepathically contacts Fettel, a new recruit to the security detail is learning about Fettel and the Replicas. One of the employees explains that ATC is worried about a second synchronicity event; in the previous one, Fettel's "brainwaves changed, like someone else had entered his mind." The team then see Alma in the corridor near Fettel's room and send the new recruit to investigate. Meanwhile, Fettel promises Alma that he'll find her no matter what, and the door to his cell blasts open. When the recruit arrives, Alma kills him as Fettel leaves his cell. The Replicas then activate and open fire, killing everyone they encounter. Fettel approaches an employee and demands to know where Alma is. When the man says he doesn't know, Fettel replies, "your tongue can lie, but your flesh will tell me everything." He then takes out a knife and begins to cut and consume part of the man.

=== Ports ===
The Xbox 360 port was announced in May 2006. Vivendi revealed that the game would be shown later that month at E3 and that the port was being handled by Day 1 Studios rather than original developers Monolith, who were now owned by Warner Bros. New to this version of the game was an "Instant Action" mode for single-player. In this mode, players are dropped into a modified level and must get to a designated point as quickly as possible while simultaneously killing as many enemies as possible and being as accurate as possible. At the end of the level, the game uploads players' stats to a global leaderboard on Xbox Live. Graphically, the Xbox 360 version was equivalent to the PC version on maximum settings and Day 1 also increased the native resolution to 720p and added high dynamic range lighting, an advanced particle system, and HD textures. The Xbox version also features an exclusive bonus level not found in the PC original, which depicts Holiday's attempt to extract Bishop from ATC headquarters. This version also features a new weapon – dual wielded automatic handguns.

The PlayStation 3 port was announced in August 2006, with Vivendi revealing it would be one of the console's launch titles, scheduled for North American release on November 17. Like the Xbox 360 version, the PlayStation 3 port was developed by Day 1 Studios. This port features the same Instant Action mode from the Xbox 360 version. It also has its own exclusive additional weapon (a street sweeper shotgun) and bonus mission, which depicts the Delta Force recon team's journey through ATC headquarters prior to encountering Alma. Like the Xbox version, the game's native resolution was 720p, but the other enhancements were removed for this version. In early November, Sierra announced that the PlayStation 3 port had been pushed back to February 2007. In February, they announced it had been pushed back to April.

In relation to the additional content in the two ports, and why it differed from system to system, producer Rob Loftus explained, "we wanted everybody to feel like they got something special. But at the same time, we didn't want to put more content in one version and have the other version suffer for it."

Monolith themselves were unhappy with the ports, specifically the difference in quality from the original, especially on the PlayStation 3. In December 2008, Project Origin's lead artist, Dave Matthews, told CVG that for the sequel, "we're handling all three versions, we've changed our development structure to develop all three SKUs simultaneously and there's no lead platform." The following month, he reiterated, "the two ports were done outside of Monolith and from a Monolith perspective we feel they didn't do everything that they could of achieved."

== Reception ==
Reception

Aggregate score
Aggregator	Score		
Aggregator	PC	PS3	Xbox 360
Metacritic	88/100	72/100	85/100

Review scores
Publication	Score		
Publication	PC	PS3	Xbox 360
Computer Gaming World	4/5		
Electronic Gaming Monthly		5/10	
Eurogamer	9/10		9/10
Game Informer	9/10		
GameSpot	9.1/10	7.1/10	8.6/10
IGN	9.2/10	8.1/10	9.1/10
Official Xbox Magazine (UK)			8/10
PSM3		7.2/10	

The initial PC release received "generally favorable reviews", and holds a score of 88 out of 100 on Metacritic, based on 57 reviews.

IGN's Tom McNamara scored it 9.2 out of 10, praising the atmosphere and weapon variety. Although he was critical of the repetitive environments and cliched plot, he called the game "one of the best shooters this year", finding it to be the best first-person shooter since Half-Life 2 (2004). GameSpot's Jason Ocampo scored it 9.1 out of 10, arguing that it "elevates the genre to a whole new level of intensity." He especially praised the combat mechanics ("some of the greatest gunplay available"), the implementation of slow-motion, and the AI ("the smartest, most aggressive, most tactically oriented AI opponents that we've ever encountered"). His criticisms focused on a lack of enemy variety, repetitive environments, and a weak plot.

Eurogamer's Tom Bramwell scored the game 9 out of 10. He too praised the implementation of slow-motion (which he found superior to the Max Payne series) and the combat mechanics (which he found superior to both Half-Life 2 and Doom 3). He also praised the AI, especially at higher difficulties. Although he was critical of the environments and weak plot, he concluded that the game felt "fresh and compelling." Game Informer's Adam Biessener also scored it 9 out of 10. He too was critical of the plot and level design, but he argued that the gameplay was so good as to make up for these problems. He especially praised the AI ("hands down the smartest AI-controlled opponents I've ever faced") and the combat mechanics ("intense almost to the point of sensory overload").

Computer Gaming World's Shawn Elliott scored it 4 out of 5. Although he was critical of the plot and the game's horror element (citing "treadmill scare tactics"), he praised the combat mechanics, AI, and implementation of slow motion. Charles Herold of The New York Times found it to be "as thrilling and involving as Half-Life, but [lacking] its narrative panache." He also criticised the characterisation, and felt that the encounters with Alma were "disconnected from the rest of the game."

Xbox 360

Like the PC version, the Xbox 360 port received "generally favorable reviews", and holds a score of 85 out of 100 on Metacritic, based on 44 reviews.

IGN's Eric Brudvig scored it 9.1 out of 10, praising the atmosphere, combat mechanics, AI, graphics, and instant action mode, but criticising the story and level design. He was also impressed with the quality of the port itself; "F.E.A.R. has made it from the PC to 360 with everything that made it an outstanding experience." Eurogamer's Kristen Reed scored it 9 out of 10, calling it the most exciting game since Burnout 2: Point of Impact (2001). He especially praised the combat mechanics, AI, and implementation of slow motion. Although he was critical of the environments, lack of enemy variety, and the "unengaging" plot, he concluded, "it gets the core of the experience so absolutely spot-on."

GameSpot's Jason Ocampo scored it 8.6 out of 10. As with many others, he was critical of the lack of enemy variety, the repetitive level design, and the plot. However, he praised the combat mechanics, implementation of slow-motion, AI, multiplayer, and graphics, calling it "easily one of the most intense and atmospheric games on the Xbox 360." The UK edition of Official Xbox Magazine scored it 8 out of 10, praising the AI and slow motion, but criticising the level design and plot.

PlayStation 3

The PlayStation 3 port received "mixed or average reviews", with a score of 72 out of 100 on Metacritic, based on, 31 reviews.

IGN's Greg Miller scored it 8.1 out of 10, and was unimpressed with the graphics and the loading times, which he clocked at up to one minute. Although he wrote that "the PS3 doesn't hold a candle to the visuals found in the Xbox 360 version", he argued that the game is "still one of the best experiences I've had on a PS3," praising the combat mechanics and multiplayer. PSM3's Tim Edwards scored it 7.2 out of 10, and was critical of the game's pace, the graphics, and the complex controls, although he was impressed with multiplayer and instant action mode.

GameSpot's Jason Ocampo scored it 7.1 out of 10, arguing that it "lacks the level of polish and atmosphere seen in the previous two versions." He especially criticised the load times and the "erratic frame rate". Electronic Gaming Monthly scored it 5 out of 10, with Joe Rybicki calling it "a tragedy" and citing "inexcusable technical issues", such as stuttering graphics, a delay when pressing fire, and sound coming from everywhere instead of being localised. He praised the atmosphere and the AI, but called it "one of the most reprehensible ports in recent memory."

=== Sales and awards ===
The game was a commercial success. The PC version received a "Silver" sales award from the Entertainment and Leisure Software Publishers Association (ELSPA), indicating sales of at least 100,000 units in the United Kingdom. By the time the game was released on PlayStation 3 in April 2007, the combined worldwide sales of the PC and Xbox 360 versions was over two million units. The PlayStation 3 version itself was the console's best selling title in April, moving 45,864 units in North America.

F.E.A.R. won Computer Games Magazine's 2005 "Best Sound Effects" award, and was a runner-up for their list of the year's 10 best PC games. It won 2005's "Best Action Game" from both the Game Critics Awards and PC Gamer US. GameSpy awarded it their 2005 "Best Story" award. In GameSpot's 2005 annual awards, it won "Best AI" and "Best Graphics (Technical)". At the 4th Annual Game Audio Network Guild Awards in 2006, it shared the "Best Use of Multi-Channel Surround" with Call of Duty 2. At the 9th Annual Interactive Achievement Awards, it was nominated for Computer Game of the Year, First-Person Action Game of the Year, Outstanding Achievement in Sound Design, and Outstanding Achievement in Visual Engineering.

Year	Publication or ceremony	Award	Result	Ref.
2005	Computer Games Magazine	Best Sound Effects	Won	
2005	Computer Games Magazine	Best PC Game	Nominated	
2005	Game Critics Awards	Best Action Game	Won	
2005	GameSpot	Best AI	Won	
2005	GameSpot	Best Graphics (Technical)	Won	
2005	GameSpy	Best Story	Won	
2005	PC Gamer US	Best Action Game	Won	
2006	Game Audio Network Guild Awards	Best Use of Multi-Channel Surround	Won (shared)	
2006	9th Annual Interactive Achievement Awards	Computer Game of the Year	Nominated	
2006	9th Annual Interactive Achievement Awards	First-Person Action Game of the Year	Nominated	
2006	9th Annual Interactive Achievement Awards	Outstanding Achievement in Sound Design	Nominated	
2006	9th Annual Interactive Achievement Awards	Outstanding Achievement in Visual Engineering	Nominated	

== Editions and expansions ==
=== Director's Edition ===
F.E.A.R. Director's Edition was announced a few weeks prior to the release of the game and was released alongside it. Accompanying the basic CD-ROM version of the game was a DVD version, which also contains the Dark Horse comic prequel, "Alma Interview", a "Making of F.E.A.R." documentary, a one-hour "Developers' commentary" (featuring writer/director/designer Craig Hubbard, artist David Longo, producer Chris Hewitt, programmer Kevin Stephens, and lead level designer John Mulkey), and "Episode #0" of P.A.N.I.C.S.

=== Extraction Point ===
The first standalone expansion, F.E.A.R. Extraction Point, was announced for PC in early May 2006. The expansion was being developed by TimeGate Studios. Because of rights issues (Monolith, who had been purchased by Warner in 2004, owned the rights to the IP and characters, but Vivendi still owned the name F.E.A.R.), it was clarified in a press release that the plot for Extraction Point had been approved by Monolith and was in line with their own plans for a full sequel, which had been announced in February. The game was first shown at E3 2006.

=== Perseus Mandate ===
Also developed by TimeGate, the second standalone expansion, F.E.A.R. Perseus Mandate, was announced for PC in July 2007 and first shown at E3 that year. It is not a narrative sequel to Extraction Point, but is instead a sidequel to both the base game and the first expansion, focusing on a different three-man F.E.A.R. squad.

=== F.E.A.R. Files ===
F.E.A.R. Files was announced for Xbox 360 in July 2007, containing both Extraction Point (which had hitherto only been available for PC) and Perseus Mandate. Originally, the plan was to release it on both PlayStation 3 and Xbox 360, but the PlayStation version was cancelled. As well as the two standalone expansions, F.E.A.R. Files also includes eight new instant action maps and five new multiplayer maps.

=== Gold Edition and Platinum Collection ===
Released on Windows in March 2007, F.E.A.R. Gold Edition includes all the content from the Director's Edition plus Extraction Point. F.E.A.R. Platinum Collection was released for Windows in November 2007, and includes the Director's Edition, Extraction Point, and Perseus Mandate. The complete F.E.A.R. series was released on Steam in July 2012, with the Platinum Collection only available as part of the bundle. The Platinum Collection was released on GOG.com in February 2015. In November 2021, the F.E.A.R. franchise was added to Microsoft's backward compatibility program, making the games playable on the Xbox One and Xbox Series X/S.

== Sequel and canonicity ==
In February 2006, Monolith confirmed they would be making a sequel to the original game, explaining that because Vivendi owned the rights to the F.E.A.R. name, the sequel would come under a different title. Up to September 2008, the sequel was to be called simply Project Origin, but that month, Monolith and Warner regained the rights to the F.E.A.R. name, allowing them to name the game F.E.A.R. 2: Project Origin. In December 2008, it was confirmed that despite initial reports that Monolith had approved the story for the two expansions and that that story was in line with their plans for a sequel, Project Origin would in fact ignore the events of both Extraction Point and Perseus Mandate and instead serve as a direct sequel to the original game. Project Origin's lead artist, Dave Matthews, explained that the expansions

were made outside of Monolith and they took the story in a very different direction than we had intended, so when we started working on F.E.A.R. 2, there was a very difficult decision. Did we try to figure out and change the story with what we were trying to tell with Alma, and incorporate the story arc with what goes on between Extraction Point and Perseus Mandate? That's when we decided to treat it as if it were a 'what if?' or an alternate spin because we thought it would be of merit to the story if it remained pure.
