= TV Sports: Basketball =

1989 video game

- Developer: Cinemaware
- Publisher: Mirrorsoft
- Platforms: Amiga, MS-DOS, TurboGrafx-16
- Release: 1989: MS-DOS; 1990: Amiga; 1991: TurboGrafx
- Genre: Sports

TV Sports: Basketball is a basketball video game developed by Cinemaware and published by Mirrorsoft for the MS-DOS (1989), Amiga (1990) and TurboGrafx-16 (1991). It is part of the TV Sports series that included TV Sports: Baseball as well as other games based on hockey and American football.

Cinemaware later re-released the game as freeware.

== Gameplay ==
The game features five-a-side basketball matches. Players can either play against the computer (controlling the players or a coach) or with another person (in versus or cooperative mode). When playing, the player can choose to control the same person during the whole match or the one currently in possession of the ball.

The game shows a vertical view and has no NBA license. The in-game perspective is from half-court. When the ball crosses half-court, a short cutscene plays showing the players running to the other side of the court as the game transitions to the opposing basket.

== Reception ==
Computer Gaming World said that TV Sports Basketball had good sound and graphics, and favorably noted its four-player option.

In the May 1990 edition of Games International, Mike Siggins complimented the "slick" graphics and arcade/strategy options, but found the manual "inexplicably vague". He concluded by giving the game an above average rating of 8 out of 10 for gameplay, and an excellent rating of 9 out of 10 for graphics, saying that "it doesn't quite recreate the speed and excitement of a real game. However, there is sufficient variety and structure to make this game worth persevering with. Just don't expect a classic".
