= Myotonic Dystrophy Foundation =

American non-profit organization

Myotonic Dystrophy Foundation (MDF)
- Founder: Shannon Lord
- Type: Non-profit
- Tax ID no.: EIN: 20-5014628
- Headquarters: Oakland, California
- Chief Executive Officer: Dr. Tanya Stevenson, EdD, MPH
- Website: www.myotonic.org

The Myotonic Dystrophy Foundation (MDF) is a patient organization focused solely on myotonic dystrophy (DM). Based in the Preservation Park of Oakland, California, MDF was founded by families living with myotonic dystrophy. It is an American 501(c)(3) non-profit organization.

== History ==
MDF evolved during the International Myotonic Dystrophy Consortium (IDMC-5) in October 2005 to create a national advocacy organization for people living with myotonic dystrophy. In September 2019, the organization rebranded to Myotonic with the hope of garnering more attention for the rare disease. However, in 2021, the organization reverted its name back to the Myotonic Dystrophy Foundation citing a strong community preference for the original moniker.
