= Middle-earth: Shadow of War =

2017 action-adventure video game

- Developer: Monolith Productions
- Publisher: Warner Bros. Interactive Entertainment
- Director: Michael de Plater
- Producer: Nathan Edson
- Designer: Bob Roberts
- Programmer: Matt Rice
- Artist: Philip Straub
- Writers: Tony Elias; Christian Cantamessa
- Composers: Garry Schyman; Nathan Grigg
- Engine: LithTech Firebird
- Platforms: PlayStation 4; Windows; Xbox One; Nintendo Switch 2
- Release: October 10, 2017; Nintendo Switch 2; September 30, 2026
- Genre: Action-adventure
- Modes: Single-player, multiplayer

Middle-earth: Shadow of War is a 2017 action-adventure game developed by Monolith Productions and published by Warner Bros. Interactive Entertainment. Shadow of War is the sequel to 2014's Middle-earth: Shadow of Mordor, both of which are based on J. R. R. Tolkien's legendarium. The game is set in between the events of Peter Jackson's The Hobbit and The Lord of the Rings film trilogies, from which the game also takes inspiration. The player continues the story of Talion, the Gondorian Ranger who bonded with the wraith of the Elf Lord Celebrimbor, as they forge a new Ring of Power to amass an army to fight against Sauron. The game builds upon the "nemesis system" introduced in Shadow of Mordor, allowing Talion to gain followers from several races of Middle-earth and command them in warfare.

Shadow of War expanded on the scope of Shadow of Mordor by introducing new game mechanics and extending the nemesis system, which procedurally generates orc characters for players to fight and recruit. The system now tracks a player's gameplay style and has enemies adapt to these tactics. Compared to its predecessor, the game features more light-hearted moments, and the five regions were designed to be bigger and more colorful. Locations in the game were inspired by the landscapes of eastern Washington, Alaska, and Iceland. Troy Baker returned to provide the voice of Talion, while simultaneously serving as the game's motion capture director. Other cast members include Alastair Duncan as Celebrimbor, Laura Bailey, and Pollyanna McIntosh.

Announced in March 2017, the game was released worldwide for PlayStation 4, Windows, and Xbox One on October 10, 2017. A port for Nintendo Switch 2 was released on September 30, 2026. Shadow of War had a generally favorable reception from critics, albeit more mixed than its predecessor. Reviewers praised the gameplay and improved nemesis system, while criticizing the game's initial microtransactions, story, and bloated world design. Shadow of War was the best-selling video game in the United States in its month of release. Monolith supported the game post-launch with free updates and two story expansions. It was the last game Monolith developed before being shut down in February 2025.

== Gameplay ==
In this gameplay screenshot, protagonist Talion is exploring Seregost, one of the five open world regions in the game.

Middle-earth: Shadow of War is an action-adventure game set in an open world and played from a third-person perspective. The player controls the game's protagonist, Talion, who has several athletic and combative abilities as a ranger of Gondor. The combat system in Shadow of War is similar to its predecessor. Talion can use his weapons to strike enemies and build up his "might" meter. Once Talion lands eight consecutive strikes, he can perform a combat finisher move, massively damaging an enemy's health. When an enemy is about to strike Talion, a symbol will appear on top of their head, signaling the player to parry their attacks. Unblockable attacks are highlighted in red, and the player must try to dodge those attacks. In addition to melee combat, players can also utilize stealth tactics when approaching their targets. Talion also has unique abilities provided by the wraith of the elf lord Celebrimbor, with whom he shares his body. Through Celebrimbor, Talion can perform magical feats such as double-jumping, activating wraith vision to highlight nearby enemies, shooting spirit arrows, wielding a spectral glaive, draining an enemy's health, or dominating them. Players must use their combined abilities to complete various missions, typically aimed to disrupt the armies of Sauron. As players progress in the game and complete story quests, they will gradually gain points to unlock new skills and abilities. Each skill can be individually upgraded to provide more gameplay perks and bonuses.

The game features a currency called "mirian", which is earned by defeating enemies. Mirian can be used to purchase weaponry and other gear, as well as followers, in the game's market. Talion has access to five different types of gear in his inventory: a sword, a dagger, a bow, armor, and a cloak. The effectiveness of a particular piece of gear is dictated by both its stat and its rarity, which is categorized into: common, rare, epic, and legendary. Players can spend the mirian and finish "unlock challenges" in order to upgrade their weapons. In addition, gems can be slotted into Talion's gear. They can be used to either increase weapon's damage, Talion's health, or the amount of mirian Talion will gain through defeating enemies or completing quests. Several lower-quality gems can be combined into a gem of the next-higher quality. As players progress in the game, they will collect legendary gear. When multiple legendary gear of the same set are collected, combat bonuses will be granted to players.

Shadow of War is made up of five different areas, which Talion can freely explore on foot or while riding tamed beasts. There are side activities that Talion can participate in, such as purifying Haedir towers, which unlocks a fast travel point for players and reveals locations of interest to players, He can also find lost Gondorian artifacts, solve puzzles to unlock "ithildin doors", collect Shelob's memories, and complete "Shadows of the Past" quests, which are challenges based on Celebrimbor's memories. Each of four of the five regions has a fortress operated by an overlord. Players must lay siege to these fortresses, and maintain control after capturing them. Each fortress has a "fortress level", which indicates how strong the warchiefs stationed inside the fortress are and how well fortified a fortress is. Players can send in their own followers to capture the fortress, and the combined strengths of their followers are reflected by the player's own "assault force level". If the fortress level and assault force level are similar, both sides would be even in strength, resulting in an even fight. After a fortress invasion has started, Talion and his followers must capture victory points, and kill the overlord in the throne room. Players can then appoint one of their followers to become the new overlord of the fortress, and improve their fortress with siege upgrades. Defense missions become available following a successful fortress conquest. After completing the game's main campaign, players can complete endgame content known as "Shadow Wars" (renamed to "Epilogue" in July 2018), in which players must defend their fortresses against hostile enemies 20 times before unlocking the game's bonus ending.

=== Nemesis system ===
The nemesis system expands upon its introduction in Middle-earth: Shadow of Mordor. Similar to the first game, enemies in the game are procedurally generated. While "generic" orcs serve as cannon fodder, as part of Sauron's armies, the game will begin tracking the ones that have notable achievements within the game, such as killing the player, or surviving an encounter with the player. Enemies in the game will remember their interactions with Talion, and taunt him when they encounter him again later. Hostile orcs may also return, scarred, with some even cheating death to exact revenge on Talion. Once the player dies, orcs will advance up the hierarchy and become captains, who are characters with unique attributes, strengths, weaknesses, and names. Intelligence on these captains can be collected through interrogating characters named "worms". Enemy orcs will also ambush Talion, which is one of the random events that can happen at any point of the game. Players, upon learning a captain's traits, can avoid tactics that aggravate or enrage a captain, and exploit their weaknesses, causing them to be dazed and leaving them defenseless. Captains in the game will also adapt, as the artificial intelligence in the game will learn the player's preferred gameplay tactics and develop strategies to counter them. Enemy orcs can be dominated through Celebrimbor's powers, allowing Talion to either recruit them, kill them, or shame them, which significantly lowers their level. Players cannot recruit orcs who have a higher level than Talion. A shamed enemy may also become a "maniac", a deranged individual whose level will increase significantly.

Shadow of War's nemesis system also extends to Talion's followers as he gradually builds his own orc army, which can be summoned to the battlefield, assisting Talion in combat. Players can recruit a captain and send them to infiltrate a fortress. They may be appointed as the bodyguard of a warchief, allowing said captain to betray the warchief in a subsequent mission. Following the death of a warchief, captains will battle each other for the position. Players will then unlock a Nemesis mission, allowing players to assist Talion's followers in battle to ensure their success. These warchiefs will then betray the overlord during fortress assault battles, thus making the fortress siege easier for Talion. There are a number of Nemesis missions, allowing Talion to perform tasks like exacting revenge on a captain who has previously killed him, or intervening in conflicts between orcs. Friendly orcs will also remember a specific encounter, saving Talion when he was about to be killed by a hostile captain, or attempting to take down a specific enemy captain on his own. Friendly orcs can also participate in fight pits, in which they battle another orc to death in order to earn gear and level up. However, friendly followers may also betray Talion. The player is able to transfer their top Nemesis and their most loyal follower from Shadow of Mordor into Shadow of War through the Nemesis Forge.

The game features two asynchronous multiplayer modes. In Online Vendetta missions, players can enter another player's nemesis system to defeat their nemesis. Once another player's nemesis has been defeated, players would receive a loot chest and "Spoils of War", Vendetta's form of experience. Social Conquest allows players to invade other players' fortresses and attempt to conquer them. This mode has two settings: friendly and ranked. Friendly allows players to invade someone's fortresses, without the risk of losing their army. Ranked, on the other hand, allows players to invade, but with a risk of losing some of their own orc followers permanently. When the game was released, players could purchase reward chests through the game's marketplace. This included Loot Chests that provide players with gear and consumables, War chests that unlock followers and training orders that improve a follower's attributes, and "Spoils of War Chests" that unlock high-level followers. In July 2018, the marketplace and all forms of microtransactions were completely removed from the game.

== Plot ==
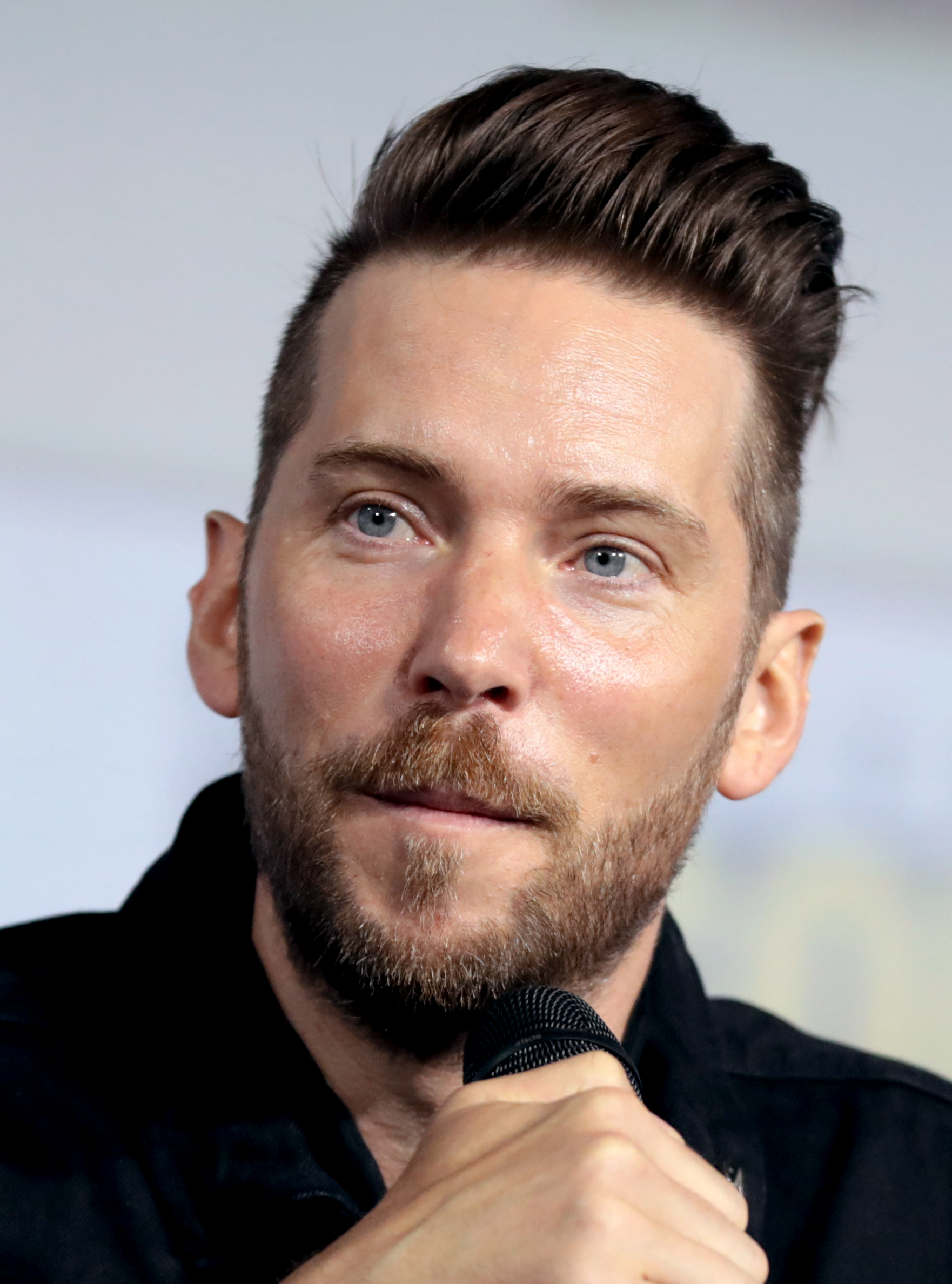
Troy Baker returned from the first game as the voice for Talion, the game's protagonist. He also served as the game's motion capture director.

Shadow of War continues the narrative from Shadow of Mordor, following undead ranger Talion (Troy Baker) who is still infused with the spirit of the elf lord Celebrimbor (Alastair Duncan). Talion and Celebrimbor travel to Mount Doom, where they forge a new Ring of Power that is free of Sauron's corruption. However, once the Ring is forged, Celebrimbor is abducted and held hostage by Shelob (Pollyanna McIntosh), who asks Talion to hand over the Ring in exchange for Celebrimbor. Talion reluctantly agrees and gives the Ring to Shelob, who claims they have a common enemy in Sauron. She uses the Ring to see into the future and directs Talion to the last Gondorian stronghold near Mordor, Minas Ithil. The city is under siege by Sauron's forces, due to the city's possession of a valuable Palantír that allows whoever possesses it to see anything they wish, making it either a valuable tool for Celebrimbor or a powerful weapon for Sauron.

Talion travels to Minas Ithil and is at odds with Celebrimbor. Talion wants to help his fellow Gondorians, while Celebrimbor believes the city is already lost and the retrieval of the Palantír must take priority. Talion reasons that protecting Minas Ithil will protect the Palantír, and he meets up with the city's defenders: General Castamir (Travis Willingham), his daughter Idril (Nicole Tompkins), and his lieutenant Baranor (Ike Amadi). Despite Celebrimbor's reluctance, Talion speaks with Shelob and receives visions that give valuable intelligence in fighting the orc armies, including that there is a human traitor among them. Together, they sabotage any efforts by Sauron's forces to break into the city, until Castamir reveals himself to be the traitor, allowing the orcs to breach the gates, and hands over the Palantír to the Witch-king of Angmar (Matt Mercer) in return for sparing Idril. Castamir is killed by the Witch-king and Talion is barely able to escape with the help of Eltariel (Laura Bailey), an Elven assassin working on behalf of Galadriel (Jennifer Hale). The Witch-king, having seized Minas Ithil, renames it Minas Morgul. With the Palantír, Sauron realizes that Shelob is holding Celebrimbor's Ring and sends the Nazgûl to attack her. Talion is able to save Shelob, who returns the Ring to him and tells him that the fate of Middle-earth is in his hands.

With the Ring back in his possession, Talion begins to use its power to dominate orcs and build his army. During this time, he assists Idril and Baranor in rescuing Gondorian survivors, helps the nature spirit Carnan (Toks Olagundoye) defeat the Balrog Tar Goroth and the necromancer Zog (Nolan North), is betrayed by one of his followers, and hunts the Nazgûl alongside Eltariel. Talion builds up enough strength to assault Sauron's fortress directly. During the battle, Talion faces Isildur (Nolan North), who has been corrupted into a Nazgûl. Talion manages to defeat Isildur, but upon seeing his memories of how he was corrupted by the One Ring, decides to destroy Isildur and release his spirit rather than dominate him. Celebrimbor remarks angrily that Isildur would have been a valuable asset to their cause, leading Talion to realize that Celebrimbor wishes to replace Sauron by dominating him rather than destroying him. Talion refuses to follow Celebrimbor's orders any more, causing the wraith to abandon him and possess Eltariel instead.

Without Celebrimbor or the Ring, Talion begins to die before seeing a vision of Shelob. She informs him that if he had gone on to fight Sauron, they would have succeeded and Celebrimbor would have enslaved Sauron and marched on the rest of Middle-earth. She implores Talion to continue to fight to contain the darkness within Mordor. Deciding to put his fate in his own hands, Talion picks up the ring Isildur was wearing to preserve his own life. He uses the power of Isildur's Ring to assault and seize Minas Morgul, defeating the Witch-king in the process. Talion takes possession of the Palantír and observes Celebrimbor and Eltariel making their assault on Sauron. The latter two manage to gain the upper hand and Celebrimbor attempts to dominate Sauron, only for Sauron to cut off two of Eltariel's fingers, one of which is adorned with the Ring of Power, and merge himself with Celebrimbor. As a result, Sauron and Celebrimbor remain trapped in Sauron's tower in the form of a flaming eye as their spirits continue to battle each other for dominance. Knowing he will not be able to resist the Ring, Talion decides to use Minas Morgul as a fortress to keep Sauron's forces contained in Mordor as long as he can.

Decades later, Talion succumbs to the corruption of Isildur's Ring, and joins Sauron's forces as a Nazgûl, where he goes with the others to hunt Frodo and the One Ring. However, with the destruction of Sauron and the One Ring, Talion dies with the rest of the Nazgûl, and his spirit is freed. He is last seen on the shores of Valinor discarding his weapons and armor as he walks off into the west.

=== Blade of Galadriel ===
Following the final battle between Celebrimbor and Sauron, Eltariel recovers Celebrimbor's Ring, and receives orders from Galadriel to continue hunting the remaining Nazgûl, including Talion. Eltariel reluctantly confronts Talion, who manages to convince her that by working together, they can keep Sauron's influence contained within Mordor. However, he informs her that a new warchief is leading a massive army and has attacked many of his fortresses. Talion tasks Eltariel with defending one of his remaining forts while he goes to defend another fort in Seregost. Eltariel manages to recruit several new tribes of orcs to fight for her and she successfully defends her fort from enemy attack, though Seregost falls. A pair of rogue Nazgûl arrive, revealing they are the ones leading the new orc army, as they plan to take advantage of Sauron and the Witch-king's weakness to take over Middle-earth. After recapturing Seregost, Eltariel and Talion pursue the Nazgûl twins to their stronghold, where Eltariel is able to defeat both of them. Despite their defeat, Talion begins to succumb to the temptation of Isildur's Ring, forcing Eltariel to battle him. Though Eltariel is victorious, Talion tells her that he will inevitably be resurrected by Sauron. Afterwards, Eltariel continues to battle the forces of Mordor until she witnesses the destruction of the One Ring. Upon seeing Celebrimbor's spirit freed from Sauron, Eltariel decides to track him down.

=== Desolation of Mordor ===
After the fall of Minas Ithil, Baranor seeks to hire mercenaries to help him seize the fortress of Shindram. On the way, he is attacked by wyrms and rescued by the dwarf Torvin (Adam Croasdell), who provides helpful inventions such as a grappling hook and a glider. Baranor continues to the Vanishing Sons mercenary camp, where he discovers that they are led by his estranged older brother Jagai, who now goes by the name of Serka (Usman Ally). Serka reluctantly agrees to help Baranor take Shindram in return for all of the loot stored inside. However, another mercenary, Zhoja, betrays Serka and sends him to fight in an orc fighting pit. Baranor rescues Serka, who reasserts control over the Vanishing Sons and executes Zhoja. After repelling an orc attack, Baranor and Serka lead their army and seize Shindram, doing so by destroying the fortress's overlord, Takra. However, rather than hold the fortress, they leave a trap for the orcs sent to retake it. Baranor and Serka leave to seize more fortresses, deciding that Gorgoroth will be their next target.

== Development ==
After the success of Middle-earth: Shadow of Mordor, Monolith Productions returned to lead the development of the sequel. Creative director Michael De Plater said that the development of Shadow of Mordor was a learning study for Monolith in how to make open world games, and the development team limited themselves in the scope of what they could deliver for that game. With those lessons learned, de Plater said that Monolith was able to take a bolder step forward for Shadow of War, saying "[t]his was our ambition to do the big, blockbuster version of the ideas we'd begun to explore in the first game. It's kind of our Terminator 2 to Terminator." Monolith upgraded their game engine, named LithTech, from Shadow of Mordor, to the Firebird engine, which can support large-scale battles and more complex features in the nemesis system.

The team wanted the game's story to "evoke some of the most iconic and epic elements" in The Lord of the Rings and The Hobbit. They created battle systems that enable large-scale battles where parts of the battle would be managed by the various Followers that the player has recruited, thus allowing the player to still focus on the violence and brutality of close-quarter combat. In addition, the team would weave these moments into the story of the game, and provide context for the nemesis system, whose ultimate goal was to facilitate Talion's complete conquest of Mordor. Explaining why the story deviated from the Lords of the Ring canon, de Plater described the story as an "adaptation" of the books. While the team wanted to capture the spirit of Middle-earth as much as possible, the team created an original story that explores "the darker side of Tolkien's works". As the game takes place in the decades between the end of The Hobbit and The Fellowship of the Ring, the team believed that they could fill in some missing details without impacting the wider story depicted in Tolkien's novels, as this period was relatively less explored in fiction. The team further compared the game to the Star Wars movie Rogue One, whereby the story of Shadow of War would lead into the events of The Lord of the Rings. The story was also designed to be accessible, and players need not play Shadow of Mordor or understand any of the Tolkien's work before playing Shadow of War. The "Shadow Wars" endgame mode was created with the intention of giving players more reasons to continue playing the game and explore the nemesis system after they complete the main story. The team expected only a small percentage of players to unlock this final ending.

Talion returned as the game's central protagonist. The game's narrative follows a three-act structure, and provides a definitive ending to Talion's story that begins in Shadow of Mordor. According to de Plater, while Talion inherited the heroic traits of Boromir, he is ultimately an everyman like Samwise Gamgee. Troy Baker returned to provide voice for Talion, while also serving as the motion capture director for all story sequences in the game. Baker drew from his experience working with Naughty Dog on The Last of Us and Uncharted 4: A Thief's End while working on the project, while working closely with the game's writers and cutscenes directors. In addition to Baker, Alastair Duncan returned to voice Celebrimbor. In the game, Celebrimbor is an ambitious "figure of power", one who believes that he can be better than Sauron, once he takes the ring. The team wanted to take players to areas outside of Mordor and have Talion meet other new characters. New members of the cast include Laura Bailey, who played the role of Eltariel, an elven assassin working for Galadriel who fights to keep the Nazgûl within Mordor. Pollyanna McIntosh voiced Shelob, a spider who can shapeshift into a human woman in the game. While this decision was initially met with a backlash from fans of the series as Shelob is not a woman in the books, writer Tony Elias added that they could explore the character in a much more in-depth manner when she was in her human form, or they would have to dramatically reduce her role in the game.

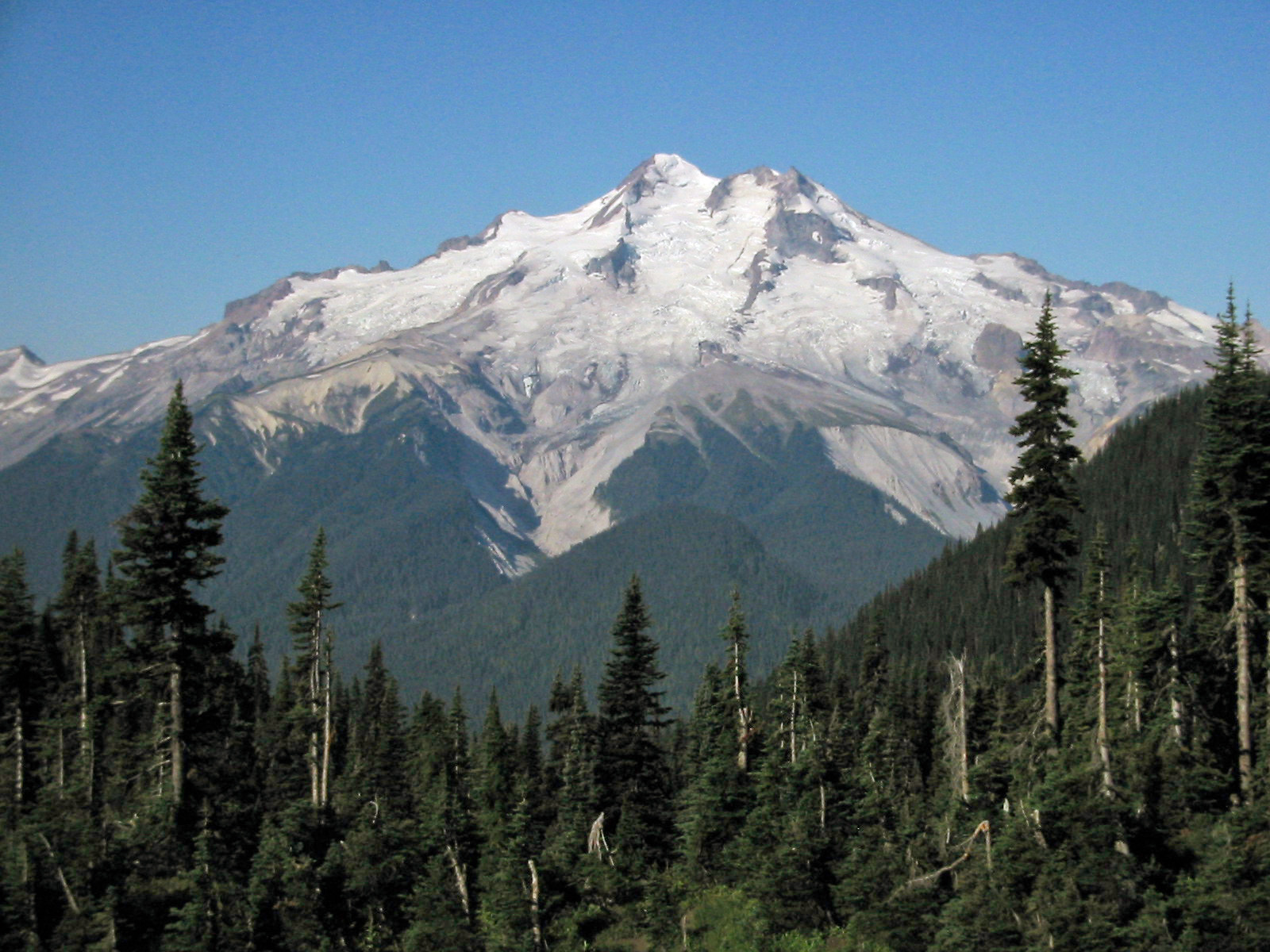
Volcanoes in eastern Washington were one of the inspirations for the locations in the game.

The team tried to devote resources to new regions as much as possible. The locations in the game were inspired by the landscapes of eastern Washington, Alaska, and Iceland. De Plater added that each region in the game was larger in size when compared to that of Shadow of Mordor, and was more environmentally diverse. The five regions were also designed to be more colorful, contrasting with the gritty artstyle of Shadow of Mordor. The human city of Minas Ithil was designed as the first location that Talion will visit. The team took inspiration from Minas Tirith, from the films, and Roman architecture, while designing the look of the city. They also consulted illustrator and architect Ted Nasmith. The team also planned for the city to be attacked and captured by Nazgûl, becoming the fallen city of Minas Morgul. Seregost was a snowy location that had changes in elevation not previously seen in its predecessor. Cirith Ungol was a massive cave complex where remnants of an ancient civilization can be found. Núrn returned in Shadow of War as a tropical island. Through Núrn, the team wanted to explore the theme of nature destruction, as orcs are destroying its lush forest to provide supplies for their war effort. Gorgoroth was described as a "hellscape", and "the culmination of all of these iconic locations and structures that everybody knows and loves from the lore made real". Gorgoroth was heavily industrialized, as the team wanted to show how the orcs are preparing for war by building different engines of war and factories. The nemesis system also influences the world itself, with each environment changing depending on the tribe of the orc overlord controlling each fortress.

=== Nemesis system improvements ===
Monolith aimed to improve the nemesis system by increasing the emotional intensity and variety of the emergent stories. Lead designer Chris Hoge explained that the best relationship between Talion and orcs is similar to a roller coaster, one that is filled with "ups and downs". He added that the more trouble an orc caused to the player, the more rewarding it would be for players when they eliminate that orc later in the game. This created a "revenge loop", where the player needs to know how to exploit an orc's weakness and break the loop. The game introduced a system named "player interaction score" (PIS), which tracks how much players interact with each individual orc in the game. The orc that a player interacts with the most is more likely to "cheat death" as they return to life to taunt the player. Certain orc archetypes were designed to appear only once per game. For instance, an orc with "the Claw" title is one whose arm has been dismembered by Talion, but nonetheless returns to face Talion with a metal prosthetic. According to Hoge, the dialogues and the in-game text were written to be "as natural and shareable as possible", so that players would share these personalized moments with their friends.

The team wanted enemy encounters to be challenging and varied. Compared with the enemy traits in Shadow of Mordor, traits in Shadow of War were more predictable, making them less likely to be completely undefeatable. This was achieved through the tribal affiliations of each orc, as each tribe has their own unique appearance and preferred approaches to combat. In addition, the team also significantly expanded Talion's combat skills, and introduced an "easy" difficulty mode to avoid frustrating players who are less competent. Monolith also curated content in the nemesis system, removing boring scenarios, while handcrafting certain scenes that the team wanted to happen in the procedural generation. While the nemesis system has been significantly expanded, the game remained a third-person action-adventure title. The team did not want players to over-strategize. The nemesis system was described as a "story-generating machine", but its calculations are not fully revealed to players.

To rectify a situation in Shadow of Mordor where competent players would rarely be killed by enemies and therefore never get to explore the nemesis system, Shadow of War's system will track a player's gameplay style and have enemies adapt to these tactics, making for a more challenging experience. The system was designed to track the player's progress and send a particular type of enemy after the player. This was designed to ensure that all types of players, regardless of their competency in the game, would get to experience the nemesis system, and create a nemesis that is "personable" and "memorable". The nemesis system was also expanded to include Talion's followers. A personal story for each orc continues after they have been recruited, as they will rescue Talion in his dying moments, deliver gifts to him, and sometimes betray him. According to de Plater, this allowed the nemesis system to further tell stories about "loyalty, betrayal and friendship", a process that does not necessarily include being killed by a hostile orc. By having orcs betray Talion, players are also given a target for revenge. When playtesting the game, the nemesis system sometimes generated unexpected results. Instead of correcting these issues, the team instead embraced these results and wrote extra dialogues for such outcomes.

Monolith strived to give each orc their own unique personality. The team wanted them to be "genuine characters", with traits of humanity. De Plater described them as "soldiers in the trenches", and the "manifestation of what happens to human beings when they get controlled completely by the emotions of hatred and fear". While orcs in the game lack empathy and a moral compass, they do not see themselves as villains. Recognizing the violence inherent in the Middle-earth setting, Monolith aimed to include light humorous elements that play off the thirst for violence that the orcs have, so that the game would not "wallow in it, or feel sadistic". Some of the orcs have to be likeable, as they will join Talion's army, fighting alongside him. In addition to the orcs, other enemies appear in the game. John Howe, the principal artist of the Lord of the Rings films, was recruited to design the appearances of ringwraiths. The Olog-Hai was a group of smart trolls created specifically for the game; their design was inspired by the super-soldiers from Warhammer 40,000: Space Marine.

== Release ==
Shadow of War was officially announced by Monolith Productions and publisher Warner Bros. Interactive Entertainment in March 2017. The title was originally scheduled to be released in August 2017, but in June of that year, the publisher announced that the release would be put off for two months, to make sure the game meets "the highest quality experience" for players. The game was released for PlayStation 4, Windows, and Xbox One on October 10, 2017. A port for Nintendo Switch 2, including all DLC content, is set to release on September 30, 2026. A free-to-play companion game for iOS and Android devices was also released on September 28, 2017, ahead of the console/PC versions. Developed by IUGO Mobile Entertainment, mobile companion versions of Shadow of War are played as a real-time strategy role-playing video game from a top-down perspective, where players can recruit characters from the console/PC versions of the game and other characters from its predecessor and The Lord of the Rings film trilogy to fight Sauron's forces in small-scale battles.

On March 3, 2016, Monolith's executive producer, Michael David Forgey, died of cancer. To commemorate the loss of Shadow of War's executive producer, Monolith, and Warner Bros. announced a downloadable content (DLC) named "Forthog Orc-Slayer". Originally selling for $5, Warner Bros. promised to donate $3.50 of the proceeds from each sale of the DLC made from any of the majority of the U.S. states to the Forgey family through December 31, 2019. Warner Bros. was criticized for attempting to cash in on Forgey's death. Following a public backlash, on September 27, 2017, the DLC was made free to all who purchased the game and all proceeds were refunded to those who purchased it beforehand, in favor of Warner Bros. making a lump sum donation to the Forgey family.

The game was released alongside an expansion pass, which grants players access to several pieces of downloadable content. Slaughter Tribe Nemesis and The Outlaw Tribe Nemesis were released in November and December 2017, respectively, introducing new orc tribes and gear. In February 2018, Blade of Galadriel, a story expansion was released. In this expansion, players would assume control of Eltariel as she fights to uncover the mystery behind the Nazgûl. In May 2018, Monolith released an expansion named Desolation of Mordor. Players assume control of Baranor, the Captain of Minas Ithil, who must work with his allies to fight against a new orc threat to the east. Several free updates have been released, introducing content such as infinite Shadow War and Online Fight Pits. In April 2018, Monolith announced that they would gradually remove all forms of microtransactions and the marketplace from the game, citing that they "compromise" the game by undermining the nemesis system, as such transactions provide players a fast shortcut to build their army. Following the change, WB Games bundled all expansion pass content with the base game, releasing it as the "Definitive Edition" in August 2018. A demo for the game, which allows players to complete all missions in the Núrn region, was also released for Steam users in August 2018.

== Reception ==
=== Critical reception ===
Reception

Aggregate score
Aggregator	Score
Metacritic	XONE: 81/100; PS4: 80/100; PC: 75/100

Review scores
Publication	Score
Destructoid	7/10
Game Informer	9.5/10
GameSpot	7/10
GamesRadar+	4.5/5
IGN	9/10
PC Gamer (US)	73/100
Polygon	7.5/10

Middle-earth: Shadow of War received "generally favorable" reviews from critics, according to review aggregator Metacritic. Many critics noted the game's ambitious scope and its significant expansion of the nemesis system, but criticized the game's story and bloated size. The introduction of microtransactions and lootboxes (war chests) were widely criticized by critics. The game was nominated for Role-Playing Game of the Year at the 21st Annual D.I.C.E. Awards.

The nemesis system was often singled out as the highlight of the game. Matt Miller from Game Informer described Shadow of War as "a playground of intense and emergent action scenes" shaped by player's choices. He was impressed by the variety of orcs he encountered in the game, and wrote that interacting with them through the game's nemesis missions helped deepen players' engagement with the game's world. Hurley also enjoyed the nemesis system for creating personalized stories on top of the main narrative, noting that each encounter with an orc may potentially develop into a unique story depending on players' decisions. Stapleton praised how the nemesis system generated numerous colorful characters and adversaries, with each having their own voice and appearance. He further applauded the system for introducing a layer of surprise and unpredictability to the game. PC Gamer's Andy Kelly described the nemesis system as the "best part" of Shadow of War. The tribal systems was singled out for producing orcs that feel like "distinct, original characters, therefore, making the relationships forged with them more "personal". Christian Donlan from Eurogamer praised the nemesis system for making the game's world feel "wonderfully, comically, teeteringly alive". However, several critics questioned the morality behind building an orc army by essentially brainwashing and enslaving them.

The combat of the game received acclaim. Matt Miller from Game Informer praised the diverse combat skills, which provided a "potent power fantasy". He also enjoyed the progression system, which kept the gameplay experience fresh despite the game's long length. Leon Hurley, writing for GamesRadar, also enjoyed the upgrade system for significantly deepening the "simple" yet "effective" counter-based combat system. He remarked that each combat scenario could be different due to the unique traits of each orc, forcing players to improvise and adapt. Dan Stapleton from IGN praised Talion's agility, calling the transversal options "quick and fun". Fortress assault was praised by critics for being epic in scale, though Stapleton was disappointed by the lack of planning and strategy involved. Johnny Chiodini from Eurogamer wrote that the game often overwhelmed players with upgrade points and skills, causing the gameplay experience to be relatively easy. As a result, this undermined the nemesis system, as he had never encountered a "nemesis" character that caused him significant trouble or could repeatedly kill his Talion.

The story of the game received generally negative reviews. Hurley remarked that the game's tone was incoherent and felt the story did not respect the source material, citing Shelob's change from a spider to a human woman as one of his disappointments with the game's narrative. Stapleton added that the game played "fast and loose" with Lord of the Ring lore, while criticizing the game's dialog as "clunky" and "derivative". Kelly also disliked the game's tone, feeling that it was "overly-serious" and lacked a sense of playfulness. Johnny Chiodini from Eurogamer also called the story "dreadful", "self-indulgent", and "bombastic nonsense". He suspected Monolith only added certain plot points "for the sake of doing things bigger for the sequel", and wrote that "the lore had been thrown out the window for the sake of a couple of schlocky and unnecessary reveals". Chris Carter from Destructoid disliked Talion, calling him "bland", and remarked that the story was "nonsensical", with "rings upon rings and comical retcons". Phillip Kollar from Polygon remarked that fans of the Tolkien's legendarium will likely find Shadow of War's story and twists to the existing canon "distasteful". Writing for GameSpot, Justin Haywald liked the stories featuring the game's side characters and orc companions, but lamented that players did not get to spend enough time with them and that these quests end abruptly.

Critics had mixed feelings about the scale of the game. While some reviewers noted the distinctiveness of the game's five regions, they also noted their lack of new enemy types or gameplay. While Miller praised the location design and described the locations as a "visual treat", Kelly criticized the uninspiring environment design and the game's "sludgy, muted look". Kelly felt that despite the abundance of systems in the game, many were not integrated properly. Elaborating on the game's bloatedness, Kelly added that the game was "constantly screaming at [players] to do things", and described its side content as a "fantasy to-do list". Carter, likewise, felt that some of the systems, such as the gear featured in the game, were overly convoluted. Andrew Webster, writing for The Verge, added that Monolith's intention to introduce more content to the game unexpectedly backfired and diluted the experience, causing great moments in the game to be overshadowed by unnecessary content, boring missions, and map markers that failed to elevate the experience.

=== Sales ===
Commercially, Shadow of War was the best-selling video game in the US in October 2017, with sales being 20% higher than its predecessor. It was the best-selling game in Australia, New Zealand and Japan in its week of release, with the game selling 23,000 copies in Japan, up 39% when compared with Shadow of Mordor. In the UK, it was the second best-selling video game in its week of release, behind FIFA 18. MCVUK reported that the game's UK launch sales may be disappointing for the publisher. Despite promising pre-order figures and one of the company's most expensive marketing campaigns, it sold fewer units than its predecessor.
