= Bo Jackson Baseball =

1991 video game

- NES box art
- Developers: NES; Beam Software; MS-DOS, Amiga; Acme Interactive; Cinemaware
- Publishers: NA: Data East; EU: Mindscape
- Designers: Scott Orr; Denny Thorley
- Composer: Marshall Parker
- Platforms: Amiga, MS-DOS, Nintendo Entertainment System, TurboGrafx-16
- Release: NES: NA: October 1991; MS-DOS: NA: 1991; Amiga: NA: 1992; EU: 1992
- Genre: Sports
- Modes: Single-player, multiplayer

Bo Jackson Baseball is a baseball video game for the Nintendo Entertainment System, Amiga, TurboGrafx-16, and MS-DOS. It features athlete Bo Jackson, then a star in professional baseball and a former professional football player. In Europe, it was released by Mindscape as TV Sports: Baseball, part of the TV Sports series including TV Sports: Basketball and other games based on hockey and American football.

== Gameplay ==
A base hit toward the back wall

The player can select from five to nine innings. Players can choose to throw five different kinds of pitches either slowly, normal, or fast.

One or two players can select exhibition mode or playoff mode. CPU vs CPU or CPU vs CPU quick mode can speed a tournament, to see the stats of that particular match and quickly end tournaments. The game uses city names but not the team names because of lack of proper licensing with Major League Baseball. The players are purely fictional and cannot be edited. Some of the player names are parodies, such as Baltimore's "Kenrip" resembling "Cal Ripken".

A cheat code allows an all-Bo Jackson baseball team. The Amiga and TurboGrafx-16 versions include a league mode and enhanced 16-bit graphics.

== Reception ==
Reception

Review scores
Publication	Score
Electronic Gaming Monthly	4.25/10
Nintendo Power	2.8/5

Computer Gaming World called the MS-DOS version best as an arcade game, and, because of its lack of real players' statistics, less successful than competitors as a simulation. Nintendo Power gave the NES version a 2.8 out of 5 in September 1991. Electronic Gaming Monthly issued a 4.25 out of 10 review in October 1991.
