= Wings (1996 video game) =

- Developer(s): Miika Virpioja
- Platform(s): MS-DOS
- Release: 1996
- Genre(s): Action
- Mode(s): Single-player, multiplayer

Wings is a freeware video game by Miika Virpioja for MS-DOS. The gameplay is similar to the 1982 Gravitar arcade video game where the player flies a small ship over a landscape using rotate and thrust controls.

The player can select one of 33 weapons, and the surroundings can be destroyed. In the original shareware release, some weapons were locked until the game was registered. The game includes multiplayer through linked computers or two or more players using one keyboard plus gamepads/joysticks. The game includes a level editor.

== Development ==
The game uses module files as the soundtrack. "januski.s3m" is an original composition by Juha Lehtioksa, guitarist of the Finnish gothic metal band Silentium, and bears a very strong resemblance to the band's song Forever Sleep on the album Infinita Plango Vulnera, released in 1999. While the track had initially been used without permission and even credited to another person, Lehtioksa had nothing against using his song in the game—in fact, he even liked the idea of having the track on Wings's soundtrack—but after receiving a number of enquiries regarding the song over the years, some of them very hostile in nature, he finally asked Virpioja to remove it from the game.
