= Monolith Productions =

Defunct American video game developer

Monolith Productions, Inc.
- Final logo, used from 2017 to 2025
- Type: Subsidiary
- Industry: Video games
- Founded: October 25, 1994; 32 years ago
- Founders: Bryan Bouwman; Toby Gladwell; Brian Goble; Jace Hall; Garrett Price; Paul Renault; Brian Waite
- Defunct: February 25, 2025; 20 months ago
- Fate: Dissolved
- Headquarters: Kirkland, Washington, United States
- Number of employees: 100+ (2004)
- Parent: Warner Bros. Games (2004–2025)
- Website: lith.com at the Wayback Machine (archived 2025-02-22)

Monolith Productions, Inc. was an American video game developer based in Kirkland, Washington. The company was a subsidiary of Warner Bros. Games from August 2004 until its shutdown in 2025. It formerly published third-party games in the 1990s. In February 2025, it was reported that Warner Bros. Games had decided to close the studio.

== History ==
Monolith Productions was founded on October 25, 1994 by Bryan Bouwman, Toby Gladwell, Brian Goble, Jace Hall, Garrett Price, Paul Renault, and Brian Waite. Co-founder Brian Goble had this to say regarding the company name.

At the time we formed the company, DOS was still the OS of choice for games. Because of this, we knew we had to come up with a name that was 8 characters or less (for 8.3 filenames). We had been researching story and technology ideas for our demo CD and we were watching a lot of movies. "Monolith" came up, was semi mysterious, wasn't taken, and was 8 characters. Perfect.

Several of the founders, include Hall, were employees of software company Edmark at the time, and the group had gotten together frequently to play games like Doom. Several felt they could try their own hand at making video games. To promote their initial ideas, they took advantage of the Redbook audio format for compact discs that allowed both audio and digital files to be stored on the same media. Hall left Edmark to start promotion of the company, and ended up with Microsoft, which was preparing for the release of Windows 95. Microsoft brought on Monolith to develop gaming CDs to demonstrate the capabilities of Windows 95 and DirectX, with the remaining founders quitting Edmark and working out of offices at Microsoft's campus in Redmond, Washington.

Hall used the gaming CDs to continue to build out a list of contacts for future expansion. This led to a significant investment from Japanese print publisher Takarajimasha, allowing Monolith to establish its own set of offices and bring on more staff to do full-time production by 1996. Initial work was done towards Claw, a game based on a shelved project by Garrett. During development, Monolith acquired Q Studios, a development team led by a friend Nick Newhard. At the time, Q Studios was finishing work on Blood and Monolith switched to focus on shipping it instead. Blood was one of the last games to use the 2.5D Build engine, but meanwhile Monolith also had a team building an in-house 3D engine. Blood was a hit with the Monolith team and replaced Doom as their office deathmatch game.

The company is best known for the Blood, No One Lives Forever and F.E.A.R series. Monolith developed the LithTech game engine which was used for most of their games starting with Shogo: Mobile Armor Division in September 1998. Between 1997 and 1999, Monolith also published games–some developed by the studio, some by third parties.

By May 1997, the company employed more than 70 people. After the end of self publishing, Monolith secured deals with Interplay Productions in early 1999, and Fox Interactive in late 1999.

Monolith reported $7.8 million in sales in 1999 and $8 million-plus in 2000.

In 2004, Monolith Productions was acquired by Warner Bros. Interactive Entertainment (now Warner Bros. Games).

In 2014, the company released the title Middle-earth: Shadow of Mordor with a sequel entitled Middle-earth: Shadow of War being released in 2017.

In 2021, the company announced that they were developing a video game starring Wonder Woman.

In 2025, Warner Bros. Games closed the studio alongside Player First Games and WB Games San Diego, cancelling Wonder Woman and refocusing development efforts on core intellectual properties.

== Video games ==
=== Developed ===
Year	Title	Platform(s)		
Year	Title	PC	Console	Handheld
1997	Blood	MS-DOS, Microsoft Windows	—	—
1997	Claw	Microsoft Windows	—	—
1998	Get Medieval	Microsoft Windows	—	—
1998	Shogo: Mobile Armor Division	Microsoft Windows, Mac OS, Linux, AmigaOS	—	—
1998	Blood II: The Chosen	Microsoft Windows	—	—
1999	Gruntz	Microsoft Windows	—	—
1999	TNN Outdoors Pro Hunter 2	Microsoft Windows	—	—
2000	Sanity: Aiken's Artifact	Microsoft Windows	—	—
2000	The Operative: No One Lives Forever	Microsoft Windows, Mac OS	PlayStation 2	—
2001	Tex Atomic's Big Bot Battles	Microsoft Windows	—	—
2001	Aliens Versus Predator 2	Microsoft Windows, Mac OS	—	—
2002	No One Lives Forever 2: A Spy in H.A.R.M.'s Way	Microsoft Windows, Mac OS	—	—
2003	Tron 2.0	Microsoft Windows, Mac OS	Xbox	Game Boy Advance
2003	Contract J.A.C.K.	Microsoft Windows	—	—
2005	The Matrix Online	Microsoft Windows	—	—
2005	F.E.A.R.	Microsoft Windows	PlayStation 3, Xbox 360	—
2005	Condemned: Criminal Origins	Microsoft Windows	Xbox 360	—
2008	Condemned 2: Bloodshot	—	PlayStation 3, Xbox 360	—
2009	F.E.A.R. 2: Project Origin	Microsoft Windows	PlayStation 3, Xbox 360	—
2012	Gotham City Impostors	Microsoft Windows	PlayStation 3, Xbox 360	—
2012	Guardians of Middle-earth	Microsoft Windows	PlayStation 3, Xbox 360	—
2014	Middle-earth: Shadow of Mordor	Microsoft Windows, OS X, Linux	PlayStation 4, Xbox One, PlayStation 3, Xbox 360	—
2017	Middle-earth: Shadow of War	Microsoft Windows	PlayStation 4, Xbox One	—

=== Published ===
Year	Title	Platform(s)
Year	Title	PC
1994	Maabus	MS-DOS
1998	Rage of Mages	Microsoft Windows
1999	Rage of Mages II: Necromancer	Microsoft Windows
1999	Septerra Core: Legacy of the Creator	Microsoft Windows
1999	Gorky 17	Microsoft Windows, Mac OS, Linux, AmigaOS
