= Market development funds =

Market development funds (MDF), also called co-op funds, are provided by manufacturer or brands in indirect sales channels to help affiliates, channel partners, resellers, VARs, or distributors sell products and promote local awareness of the national brand. In the US, around 4,500 Co-op programs cover 50 product classifications, with approximately $50 billion spent annually; slightly over half of these funds go unused due to implementation issues by uninformed partners.

== Funding Structures ==
MDFs are structured in different ways depending on the brand's relationship with its affiliates (Open vs. Closed networks), the destination of Co-op Funds (direct mail, email marketing, local PPC, etc.), and the affiliate segment the brand seeks to motivate or reward (top, average, or low performers). The structure of Co-op money is important as it affects affiliates' willingness to participate in the brand's programs. In email marketing, B2B-focused MDF campaigns may include personalized emails, re-engagement, product announcements, and cross-sell initiatives, often using automation to enhance lead generation and engagement. Below are four common funding structures.

Stipend – This structure gives affiliates a fixed amount of money (e.g., $300 per month) to opt into marketing programs made available by the brand. Affiliates can choose among multiple programs, though brands usually highlight preferred programs, giving them prominence on the main MDF interface.

Fixed Quantity – Instead of a monetary amount, brands may provide a fixed number of items (e.g., direct mail pieces) or program resources (e.g., local PPC) at no cost. This approach aims to motivate local affiliates while supporting strong brand engagement.

Discount – Brands partially subsidize affiliates' local marketing spend with discounted (but not free) programs, encouraging participation by improving the expected ROI of their marketing efforts.

Rebate – Some Brands reimburse their local partners for money spent on approved advertising. This approach is often not recommended because Brands have a hard time motivating affiliates to spend their money first and try to recoup it later through cumbersome reimbursement logistics.
