= Purge (video game) =

2003 video game

- Developer: Freeform Interactive
- Publisher: Tri Synergy
- Platform: Windows 98/ME/2K/XP
- Release: NA: April 15, 2003
- Genre: First-person shooter
- Mode: Multiplayer

Purge or PurgeFinal (formerly known as PurgeJihad), is a free first-person shooter computer game published by Freeform Interactive LLC. It is an unofficial sequel to the Future vs. Fantasy total conversion mod for Quake, and combines futuristic and magical themes, based on the FvF purge game mode. Purge came out of open beta in 2003. It became freeware in 2007, and Freeform Interactive LLC had distributed a keygen which enabled anyone to play the game for free.

== Gameplay ==
Purge focuses on character development rather than straightforward first-person shooter gameplay. Each player must choose a side: the Order (technology) or the Chosen (magic). The Order's forces consist of the Android, Cyborg, Commando and Wastelander, while Mages, Fighters, Assassins and Monks make up the Chosen. The player then chooses attributes for their character and can customize their character's appearance.

The maps in Purge range from small scale for 2-to-24 players, to large for 10-to-64 players.

== Critical reception ==
Both GameSpot and IGN rated Purge as "mediocre". IGN highlighted detailed environments with well-defined textures and impressive effects and argued that Purge was a notable example within the "character development" niche of action genre. Criticisms included indistinct vocal commands, some unsuitable weapon sound effects, a "practically nonexistent" playing community, lack of game modes and unpolished level design.
