= Peter Lurie =

American voice actor, sports anchor and TV personality

- Other name: Chuck Farley
- Occupations: Voice actor, horse race commentator, television personality
- Years active: 1988–present
- Agent: VOX
- Father: Allan Lurie

Peter Lurie is an American voice actor, sports anchor and television personality who has worked in television shows, movies, and dubbed anime, since the mid-1990s. He is most well known for his role as the voice of Vulcan Raven in the Metal Gear video game series, Marvel Comics supervillain Sabretooth and Paxton Fettel of F.E.A.R. series. He currently works as an HRTV, TVG Network anchor, and as an in-house host for Hoosier Park, and for Indiana Grand Racetrack as well.

== Biography ==
=== 1980s ===
Early in his career, Lurie worked as a tour guide at Universal Studios Hollywood. The owner of the recording studio heard Lurie giving a tour, and recommended he try out voice acting. Six months later, Lurie got his first job as a sound engineer for ABC's Wild World of Kids. During this time, he continued to develop music with a band he co-founded called "Fourth Car Foreign". The group existed for 10 years, but was not a commercial success.

=== 1990s ===
Lurie was avid about horse racing, and started a horse racing venture with his ward and train Warren Sdut, dean of California Horse Racing, in the 1990s. The venture was moderately successful for approximately five years.

=== 2000s ===
Lurie later began to work as a jockey's agent. While working in this capacity, he was offered a job by a new horse racing channel, HRTV. Lurie has been part of the broadcast team since 2002. In addition to his HRTV success, Lurie had a successful voice-over career in the film industry, including his role in the Academy Award-winning animated short film The ChubbChubbs! by Sony Pictures ImageWorks. He has also worked as an in-house host for Indiana Grand Racetrack since 2015.

== Filmography ==
=== Anime ===
Year	Title	Role	Notes
1998	Nightwalker: The Midnight Detective	Riho's Father	Episode: "Eien no Yami"
1999	Arc the Lad	Alfred, Hunter C	2 episodes
1999–2003	The Big O	Dan Dastun	25 episodes
2000	Transformers: Robots in Disguise	Slapper	39 episodes
2003	Wolf's Rain	Chen	2 episodes
2004–2006	Naruto	Kidomaru, Tobirama Senju	17 episodes
2005	Bleach	Jidanbo Ikkanzaka	2 episodes
2005	Monster	Karl Lanke, Robbie, Hotel Manager	6 episodes
2008	Code Geass	Viceroy Calares	2 episodes
2011–2016	Naruto: Shippuden	Kidomaru, Hashirama Senju, Mijin, young Danzo Shimura	34 episodes
2014–2016	Terra Formars	Narrator, Jason Carlos Bourne	27 episodes

=== Animation ===
Year	Title	Role	Notes
1998	Cow and Chicken	Head Farmer	Episode: "I Am Vampire"
1999-2000	Crashbox	Johnnie Jumble, Noah	24 episodes
2008	Wolverine and the X-Men	Sabretooth	2 episodes
2010	Black Panther	Juggernaut, additional voices	5 episodes
2012–2013	Ultimate Spider-Man	Sabretooth, additional voices	2 episodes
2012	Teenage Mutant Ninja Turtles	Leatherhead, Triceraton, Mask, Z	12 episodes

=== Film ===
Year	Title	Role	Notes
2000	Street Fighter Alpha: The Animation	Professor Sadler	English dub
2001	Cowboy Bebop: The Movie	Spy C, ISSP Delta Squad	English dub
2001	The Little Polar Bear	Lemming #4	

=== Video games ===
Year	Title	Role	Notes
1998	Metal Gear Solid	Vulcan Raven, Genome Soldier	English dub Credited as Chuck Farley
1998	Grim Fandango	Celso Flores, Slisko	
1999	Star Wars Episode I: Racer	Boles Roor, Neva Kee	
1999	Star Wars: Episode I – The Phantom Menace	Anabar, Scavenger	
1999	Revenant	Daly, Ogrok Gatekeeper	
2000	Grandia II	Mareg, Gatta, Brother 2	English dub
2000	Sword of the Berserk: Guts' Rage	Zodd	
2001	Max Steel: Covert Missions	Jefferson Smith	
2002	Spider-Man	Mendel Stromm, Kraven the Hunter	Xbox version only
2002	Age of Mythology	Kamos	
2003	Star Wars Jedi Knight: Jedi Academy	Marka Ragnos, Dasariah Ragnos, Vil Kothos	
2004	Metal Gear Solid: The Twin Snakes	Vulcan Raven	
2004	X-Men Legends	Avalanche, Sabretooth	
2004	EverQuest II	Quartermaster Brennar, Golem, Zombie, Shadowman	
2005	Rave Master	King/Gale Raregrove	
2005	X-Men Legends II: Rise of Apocalypse	Blob, Sabretooth, Holocaust	
2005	Ultimate Spider-Man	Norman Osborn / Green Goblin	
2005	F.E.A.R.	Paxton Fettel	
2006	Ape Escape 3	Pipo Snake, Solid Snake	English dub Substituting for David Hayter, his usual voice actor
2006	Metal Gear Acid 2	Herab Serap	English dub
2006	Superman Returns	Riot	
2006	Marvel: Ultimate Alliance	Executioner	
2006	F.E.A.R. Extraction Point	Paxton Fettel	
2007	F.E.A.R. Perseus Mandate	Paxton Fettel, Nightcrawler Commander	
2008	Metal Gear Solid 4: Guns of the Patriots	Enemy Soldiers	English dub
2008	Naruto: The Broken Bond	Kidomaru, additional voices	English dub
2009	F.E.A.R. 2: Project Origin	Paxton Fettel, Foxtrot 813, Replica Forces Commander	
2011	Resistance 3	Wardens	
2011	F.E.A.R. 3	Paxton Fettel	
2012	Naruto Shippuden: Ultimate Ninja Storm Generations	Kidomaru	English dub
2012	Skylanders: Giants	Prism Break	
2013	Naruto Shippuden: Ultimate Ninja Storm 3	Kinkaku, Hashirama Senju	English dub
2013	Skylanders: Swap Force	Prism Break	
2014	Naruto Shippuden: Ultimate Ninja Storm Revolution	Hashirama Senju	English dub
2014	Skylanders: Trap Team	Prism Break	
2014	Teenage Mutant Ninja Turtles: Danger of the Ooze	Leatherhead	
2015	Skylanders: SuperChargers	Prism Break	
2016	Naruto Shippuden: Ultimate Ninja Storm 4	Hashirama Senju	English dub
2017	Persona 5	Additional voices	English dub
2019	Marvel: Ultimate Alliance 3: The Black Order	Juggernaut	
2020	Persona 5 Royal	Additional voices	English dub
2022	Marvel's Midnight Suns	Sabretooth, Howard Stark	
2023	Diablo IV	Creatures	
2023	Naruto x Boruto: Ultimate Ninja Storm Connections	Hashirama Senju	English dub
2024	Batman: Arkham Shadow	CO Dominic	
