= F.E.A.R. Perseus Mandate =

Standalone expansion pack for F.E.A.R.

- Developer: TimeGate Studios
- Publisher: Vivendi Games (Note: Released under the Sierra Entertainment brand name)
- Producer: Tim Hall
- Designer: Brett Norton
- Programmer: Denis Papp
- Artist: Thomas Woods III
- Writer: Richard Pearsey
- Composers: Gabriel Mann; Rebecca Kneubuhl
- Series: F.E.A.R.
- Platforms: Windows; Xbox 360
- Release: NA: November 6, 2007; AU: November 8, 2007; EU: November 16, 2007
- Genres: First-person shooter, psychological horror
- Modes: Single-player, multiplayer

F.E.A.R. Perseus Mandate is the second standalone expansion pack for the first-person shooter psychological horror video game F.E.A.R. First Encounter Assault Recon. Developed by TimeGate Studios and originally published by Vivendi Games under the Sierra Entertainment label, it was released for Windows and Xbox 360 in November 2007. The Xbox version was only available packaged with the first expansion, F.E.A.R. Extraction Point, and released as F.E.A.R. Files. On the PC, as well as a standalone release, Perseus Mandate was also bundled with the original game and Extraction Point for F.E.A.R. Platinum Collection, which was also released on Steam in 2012 and GOG.com in 2015. In 2021, F.E.A.R. Files was added to Microsoft's backward compatibility program, making the games playable on the Xbox One and Xbox Series X/S. Neither expansion is now considered canon, as the Monolith Productions-developed F.E.A.R. 2: Project Origin ignores the events of both.

The game is not a narrative sequel to Extraction Point, but rather a "sidequel" that runs parallel to the second half of the original F.E.A.R. and most of Extraction Point. The story follows a new player character who is a member of a secondary F.E.A.R. team tasked with investigating Armacham's Perseus Project. Finding themselves facing a previously unknown and highly skilled mercenary squad, the team must race to stop the mercs from acquiring potentially dangerous information pertaining to Alma Wade and Paxton Fettel.

The game received mixed reviews on both systems. On the PC, although they praised the combat mechanics, critics were unimpressed with the dated graphics and the game's similarity to the previous titles in the series. Similarly, on the Xbox 360, most critics found F.E.A.R. Files dated and too similar to the original. Critics were also unimpressed with the new playable character, noting that he is virtually identical to Point Man in every way.

== Gameplay ==
F.E.A.R. Perseus Mandate is a first-person shooter with gameplay very similar to the original F.E.A.R. and the first expansion pack, F.E.A.R. Extraction Point. As in both of those games, the player's arsenal includes handguns (which the player can dual wield), an assault rifle, submachine gun, shotgun, sniper rifle, nail gun, repeating cannon, rocket launcher, and particle beam. The minigun and laser carbine from Extraction Point are also available. New weapons in Perseus Mandate are a grenade launcher, night vision rifle, and lightning arc. Each weapon differs in terms of accuracy, range, rate of fire, and damage. Only five different firearms can be carried at any one time. The player also has access to four different types of projectile - frag grenades, proximity grenades, remote bombs, and deployable turrets. The player can carry ten of each type and can carry all four at once (allowing for up to 40 projectiles), but only one type may be equipped at any one time. Additionally, when using the remote bombs, the player must holster their weapon.

As in the original game and Extraction Point, Perseus Mandate's melee combat is a viable combat alternative. The butts of all firearms can be used in close combat; lighter weapons, although less powerful, allow the player to move around more quickly and increase the chances of a successful melee attack. Movement speed is maximized if a player holsters their weapon, which allows them to engage in hand-to-hand combat. As well as the basic melee attack, players can also perform a jumping kick and a sliding tackle, both of which, if landed correctly, instantly kill regular enemies.

A prominent gameplay element in Perseus Mandate is "reflex time"; an ability which slows down the game world while still allowing the player to aim and react at normal speeds. This effect is represented by stylized visual effects, such as bullets in flight that cause air distortion or interact with the game's particle system. The duration which reflex time lasts is limited, determined by a meter which slowly fills up automatically when the ability is not being used. The player can permanently increase the size of the reflex meter by picking up reflex boosters. Other pickups available during the game include medkits (of which the player can store ten), protective armor (reduces the amount of damage the player takes during combat), and health boosters (permanently increase the player's health meter).

Reflex time is an important element of the game's combat mechanics insofar as Perseus Mandate's artificial intelligence allows hostile NPCs an unusually large range of action; enemies can duck to travel under crawlspaces, jump through windows, vault over railings, climb ladders, and push over large objects to create cover, all in reaction to what the player is doing at any given moment. Various opponents may also act as a team, taking back routes to flank the player, using suppressive fire, taking cover and often falling back if under fire, alerting one another as to the player's location, and giving one another orders (which may, or may not, be followed).

Perseus Mandate also features three bonus missions that are unlocked after the single-player campaign is beaten. These bonus missions are similar to the "Instant Action" missions of the Xbox 360 and PlayStation 3 versions of the original F.E.A.R., and have the player progressing through small plot-free levels while fighting through waves of enemies.

=== Multiplayer ===
Perseus Mandate features a modified version of the original F.E.A.R.'s multiplayer, which includes new player models as well as the five new single-player weapons added by the two expansions (the lightning arc, grenade launcher, and night-vision rifle from Perseus Mandate, and the minigun and laser carbine from Extraction Point), and the deployable turrets.

The game's multiplayer can support up to 16 players, and features deathmatch, team deathmatch, elimination, team elimination, capture the flag, "Control" and "Conquer All". There are also game types specifically designed to allow players to use reflex time; SlowMo deathmatch, team SlowMo deathmatch, and SlowMo capture the flag. These game types feature a reflex power-up, which only one player can carry at a time, and when it is fully charged (it charges when it is being carried) that player can activate it and give themselves (and the rest of their team if applicable) a considerable speed advantage over opposing players. However, whoever is carrying the power-up will have a bluish glow and will be permanently visible on all players' mini-maps.

== Plot ==
Perseus Mandate is a sidequel to the original F.E.A.R. and Extraction Point, beginning moments after Armacham Technology Corporation (ATC) security turn on F.E.A.R. and kill Aldus Bishop as he is being extracted by Delta Force.

As the game begins, the senator heard at the end of the original game orders a man named Gavin Morrison to retrieve Perseus at all costs. Meanwhile, a second F.E.A.R. team composed of Cpt. Raynes, Lt. Chen, and an unnamed sergeant (the player character), is preparing to infiltrate ATC's Global Data and Security Center. Their orders are to find and retrieve anything related to Project Perseus, a classified ATC operation that was attempting to develop a unit of telepathically-controlled clone soldiers (known as Replicas). As ATC Security and the Replicas openly battle in the streets, F.E.A.R. breach the building, only to discover that an unknown group has already infiltrated the facility.

They soon learn that the group is a highly skilled mercenary squad known as the Nightcrawlers and is neither ATC nor Replica-affiliated. The team then see a security feed of Morrison interrogating the head of Project Perseus, Bristol, in an attempt to gain access to secure files. When Bristol refuses to comply, the leader of the Nightcrawlers, known as Albino, slits his throat. Meanwhile, the sergeant heads to the mainframe computer to download files related to Perseus, after which the team are extracted.

Based on information in the files, the team are deployed to Armacham Plaza where Chen is dispatched to investigate ATC Archives and the sergeant to investigate their bio-research facility. As he moves through the facility, he learns that Morrison is trying to get something referred to as "The Source". The sergeant then overhears Morrison and Albino arguing, and when Morrison leaves, Albino orders his men to kill Morrison once the mission is over. Meanwhile, Chen finds information on a secret underground cloning facility nearby. The sergeant then learns that the Source is actually Paxton Fettel's DNA, which is stored in the bio-research facility.

Morrison acquires the DNA and is pursued by F.E.A.R., who discover the Replicas have shut down (coinciding with Fettel's death in the original game). Just as they are about to apprehend Morrison, the Origin facility explodes, sending out shockwaves (coinciding with the end of the original game). In the confusion, Morrison escapes, and Chen and the sergeant make it into an abandoned subway station (the same one traversed by Point Man in Extraction Point). As they move through the tunnels, Chen is killed when he is dragged into the floor by a supernatural entity. The sergeant eventually reaches the surface, and reestablishes contact with Raynes, who orders him to make his way to the cloning facility. En route, the replicas reactivate (following Fettel's resurrection at the start of Extraction Point).

The sergeant then encounters Morrison, who has been imprisoned by the Nightcrawlers. Morrison says that the Nightcrawlers are now attempting to acquire a sample of Alma Wade's DNA, which is housed in the cloning facility. He also knows a shortcut to the facility, and so the sergeant frees him. Morrison gets the sergeant into the facility but is immediately killed by Alma. The sergeant navigates through the facility, occasionally encountering Fettel, who makes cryptic comments about Projects Origin and Perseus, the first synchronicity event, and Point Man. Albino gets to the DNA first, but the sergeant pursues and defeats him, taking the DNA. He then meets up with Raynes and the two fight their way to the evac helicopter. The sergeant has a final vision of Chen who, unlike prior hallucinations, now appears peaceful. They escape safely and Raynes promotes him to Lieutenant.

After the credits, audio plays of the Nightcrawlers finding Morrison's body. A Nightcrawler brings the Senator the sample of Fettel's DNA, revealing the DNA acquired by F.E.A.R. must have been Alma's. The Senator asks about the events, to which the Nightcrawler replies that the losses were "acceptable".

=== Canonicity ===
Perseus Mandate is not considered canon in the F.E.A.R. universe insofar as F.E.A.R. 2: Project Origin disregards the events of both Extraction Point and Perseus Mandate, acting instead as a direct sequel to the original game. When Extraction Point was announced, initial reports stated that Monolith Productions, creators of the original game, had given the expansions' storylines their blessing, and that they were in line with their own in-development sequel. However, in December 2008, a year after the release of Perseus Mandate and a few months before the release of Project Origin, Dave Matthews, Project Origin's lead artist, explained that the expansions

were made outside of Monolith and they took the story in a very different direction than we had intended, so when we started working on F.E.A.R. 2, there was a very difficult decision. Did we try to figure out and change the story with what we were trying to tell with Alma, and incorporate the story arc with what goes on between Extraction Point and Perseus Mandate? That's when we decided to treat it as if it were a 'what if?' or an alternate spin because we thought it would be of merit to the story if it remained pure.

The player character is here accompanied by two friendly NPCs, a gameplay element emphasised during the game's promotion.

== Development ==
F.E.A.R. Perseus Mandate was announced in July 2007 and was first shown at E3. In the same announcement it was revealed that the Xbox 360 version of the game would be bundled with F.E.A.R. Extraction Point (previously only available on PC) and released under the name F.E.A.R. Files. Developers TimeGate Studios revealed that the game would not be a narrative sequel to Extraction Point, but a sidequel to the base game and the first expansion, focusing on a different F.E.A.R. team. They also stressed that the player would be accompanied for much of the game by an AI companion, a design decision made after the section in Extraction Point where Holiday joins Point Man received very positive feedback.

Originally, the plan was to release F.E.A.R. Files on both PlayStation 3 and Xbox 360, but the PlayStation version was cancelled. As well as the two standalone expansions, F.E.A.R. Files also includes eight new instant action maps and five new multiplayer maps. The complete F.E.A.R. series was released on Steam in July 2012, with the Platinum Collection only available as part of the bundle. The Platinum Collection was released on GOG.com in February 2015. In November 2021, the F.E.A.R. franchise, including F.E.A.R. Files, was added to Microsoft's backward compatibility program, making the games playable on the Xbox One and Xbox Series X/S.

== Reception ==
Reception

Aggregate score
Aggregator	Score	
Aggregator	PC	Xbox 360
Metacritic	61/100	66/100

Review scores
Publication	Score	
Publication	PC	Xbox 360
Eurogamer		7/10
Game Informer		6.5/10
GameSpot	5.5/10	7/10
IGN	5.9/10	6.7/10
Official Xbox Magazine (US)		8/10
PALGN	6.5/10	
PC Gamer (UK)	77%	

Both versions of Perseus Mandate received "mixed reviews". The PC version holds a score of 61 out of 100 on Metacritic, based on 27 reviews. On the Xbox 360, F.E.A.R. Files holds a score of 66 out of 100, based on 43 reviews.

Writing for PC Gamer UK, Kieron Gillen scored the PC version 77%. Although critical of the environments, he felt, "fans won't be disappointed." PALGN's Neil Booth scored it 6.5 out of 10, criticising it for not "deviating one inch from the formula." Although he praised the combat mechanics, the implementation of slow motion, the sound design, and the music, he argued that the game is "so familiar that an air of been-there-done-that sucks a lot of the life out."

IGN's Dan Adams scored it 5.9 out of 10, citing the lack of notable new content and finding the graphics and gameplay to be virtually identical to the original. He concluded, "if you're looking for something new or compelling and some flashy sound or visuals, don't bother." GameSpot's Jason Ocampo scored it 5.5 out of 10. He was heavily critical of the graphics ("look like they'd fit in with a shooter from a decade ago") and the game's similarity to the previous titles; "it's difficult to play this expansion without feeling that you're doing the exact same things that you've done countless times before."

Official Xbox Magazine's Casey Lynch scored F.E.A.R. Files 8 out of 10, finding Extraction Point superior to Perseus Mandate. Of the bundle as a whole, he wrote that he was "hoping for more variety in the environments and more revelation in the plotline." Eurogamer's Kristen Reed scored it 7 out of 10, finding Perseus Mandate the better of the two games. He was especially critical of Extraction Point's level design, arguing that the linearity of the levels undermined the AI; "most enemies [are] clustered in groups of threes and fours, and you tend to face them as they're being funnelled through manageable choke points." He was also critical of the graphics and the lack of innovation, finding the games' "ambitions are mainly to offer more of the same."

IGN's Erik Brudvig scored it 6.7 out of 10, praising the gameplay, combat mechanics, implementation of slow motion, AI, and the player's arsenal. However, he felt both games suffered "from a lack of identity", with each failing "to make themselves feel distinct." He concluded that the games felt "out of date and half-hearted." Game Informer's Adam Biessener scored it 6.5 out of 10, arguing that the expansions "fail to recapture the magic of the original." He was critical of the level design, finding the larger arenas unsuited to the close combat mechanics. He concluded, "these expansions are a noticeable downgrade from the first story."
