= F.E.A.R. 3 =

2011 video game

- Developer: Day 1 Studios
- Publisher: Warner Bros. Games
- Director: T.J. Wagner
- Producers: Dan Way; Ernest Zamora; Tim Shymkus
- Designer: Frank Rooke
- Programmer: Matthew Singer
- Artist: Heinz Schuller
- Writers: Steve Niles; Davidson Cole; Stephen E. Dinehart
- Composer: Jason Graves
- Series: F.E.A.R.
- Platforms: PlayStation 3; Windows; Xbox 360
- Release: NA: June 21, 2011; EU: June 24, 2011; AU: June 29, 2011
- Genres: First-person shooter, psychological horror
- Modes: Single-player, multiplayer

F.E.A.R. 3 (stylized as F.3.A.R.) is a 2011 first-person shooter psychological horror video game for PlayStation 3, Windows, and Xbox 360. Developed by Day 1 Studios and published by Warner Bros. Games, it was released on all platforms in June 2011. It is the third game in the F.E.A.R. series. In 2015, it was released on GOG.com, and in 2021, it was added to Microsoft's backward compatibility program, making it playable on the Xbox One and Xbox Series X/S. Filmmaker John Carpenter consulted on the cutscenes and script, which was written by comic writer and novelist Steve Niles. It is the only F.E.A.R. game to feature co-op gameplay.

The game takes place nine months after the conclusion of F.E.A.R. 2: Project Origin, with Alma Wade's pregnancy nearing its end. When a resurrected Paxton Fettel rescues Point Man from captivity by Armacham Technology Corporation (ATC) in a Brazilian prison, the two distrustful brothers head back to Fairport. Point Man plans to save the still-missing Jin Sun-Kwon and prevent Alma from giving birth. Fettel, however, has an entirely different motive. Meanwhile, a new threat emerges, one of which even Alma herself is terrified.

Beginning life as F.E.A.R. 2, the game was initially to be published by Vivendi Games as direct competition to Monolith Productions' Project Origin. However, when Warner acquired the rights to the entire franchise, the game was reconstituted as F.E.A.R. 3. Subsequently, a difficult development cycle saw Day 1 and Warner clashing over multiple gameplay and tonal elements, with Warner forcing Day 1 to build the game as a co-op. Enamoured of the success of the Call of Duty games, Warner also mandated more focus on action and less on horror, the exact opposite of what Day 1 had originally planned for the game. Forced to crunch, many of Day 1's staff left the project before it was completed. After three postponements, the game was eventually released, but few at Day 1 were happy with it, feeling that although it was a satisfactory first-person shooter, it was not a F.E.A.R. game.

F.E.A.R. 3 received generally mixed reviews. Critics generally lauded the multiplayer, co-op, the differentiation between the play styles of Point Man and Fettel, graphics, gameplay and the combat mechanics, but were unimpressed with the plot, the absence of any real horror, and the short length of the campaign. The game's sales were considered disappointing, and the F.E.A.R. franchise has been on hiatus since its release. (Note: A free-to-play online multiplayer game called F.E.A.R. Online was released in 2014. Developed by Korean company Inplay Interactive and published by Aeria Games under license from Warner Bros. Interactive Entertainment, although it did feature a narrative-based co-op campaign set within the F.E.A.R. universe, it is not considered canon nor a part of the core F.E.A.R. series. The servers were shut down in 2015 with the game still in open beta.)

== Gameplay ==
F.E.A.R. 3 is a first-person shooter in which the campaign can be played in either single-player mode or co-op mode. As well as being playable online, co-op is also available offline via split screen. In single-player mode, the player can initially only play as Point Man. However, upon the completion of each level, the player unlocks the ability to play through that level as Paxton Fettel. Level layout, cutscenes, and dialogue are identical irrespective of which character the player is using.

When playing as Point Man, the player's arsenal includes a handgun, assault rifle, submachine gun, combat shotgun, sniper rifle, nail gun, rocket launcher, machine pistols (which the player can dual wield), and arc weapon. Only two different firearms can be carried at any one time. Point Man also has access to three different types of projectile - frag grenades, flash bangs, and zap grenades (electricity-based). The player can initially carry only two of each type, but this limit can be upped to five via upgrades. The player can carry all three types at once, but only one type may be equipped at any one time. Players can also "cook" grenades before throwing them; arming them but holding onto them for a moment before tossing them. An on-screen meter tells the player how much time is left before they detonate. Point Man also carries a knife for hand-to-hand combat, and can perform a silent insta-kill on an enemy if he can sneak up behind the enemy without being seen. He also has several melee attacks, such as a punch, a jumping kick, and a sliding kick.

A prominent gameplay element when playing as Point Man is "reflex time"; an ability which slows down the game world while still allowing the player to aim and react at normal speeds. This effect is used to simulate Point Man's superhuman reflexes, and is represented by stylized visual effects, such as bullets in flight that cause air distortion or interact with the game's particle system. The duration which reflex time lasts is limited, determined by a meter which slowly fills up automatically when the ability is not being used.

Instead of reflex time, when playing as Fettel, the player has access to a possession ability. Like reflex time, possession is determined by an on-screen meter, but unlike reflex time, possession only becomes available when the meter is full. The ability allows Fettel to take control of an enemy NPC, who then becomes the playable character. When Fettel possesses an NPC, he gains access to any abilities and weaponry wielded by that individual, meaning that although the player cannot use guns when playing directly as Fettel, they can use guns when Fettel possesses gun-wielding enemies. Once in possession of an NPC, the possession meter will begin to empty, and when it is depleted, the possession ends, and the player returns to controlling Fettel. The meter fills up automatically when the ability is not being used, and killing enemies while possessing an NPC will drop psychic energy pickups that the player can collect to recharge the meter by a set amount. The player also has the option to manually end possession at any time.

Fettel attacks an enemy in his normal form, suspending the NPC in mid-air.

Although he cannot carry any weapons in his normal form, Fettel does have other combat abilities. He can fire bolts of psychic energy, use telekinesis to lift and throw objects, punch enemies, crush their heads with his hands (if he can successfully sneak up behind them), suspend them mid-air, explode them (if he is close enough to a suspended enemy), and send out a concussive blast (only available in co-op mode, and only when the other player is using Point Man's reflex time ability).

Whether playing in single-player or co-op mode, the player can permanently increase the size of the reflex time/possession meter via the game's ranking system, which is based on completing various challenges in four different categories (aggressive, technical, aptitude, psychic). These challenges include such things as killing a certain number of enemies, using specific weapons a certain number of times, finding hidden collectibles, using reflex time or possession for a certain amount of time, killing a certain number of enemies from cover, etc. Completing a challenge awards points, and when enough points have been accrued, the player's rank increases. Each rank progression gives the player an award, such as increasing the size of the reflex time/possession meter, unlocking new melee abilities, increasing ammo and grenade capacity, or allowing the player's health to regenerate faster.

As with F.E.A.R. 2: Project Origin, the player can use mechs, although in F.E.A.R. 3 there are two available; the REV9 Powered Armor and the Enhanced Power Armor (EPA). The REV9 is armed with two burst cannons and a head-mounted raygun. The EPA has two miniguns and a shoulder-mounted rocket launcher. Ammo is infinite for all weapons, but the cannons/miniguns overheat if fired continuously, and require a short cool-down period. Similarly, the raygun/rocket launchers require a moment to arm. Both mechs also have fully regenerative health. New to the EPA in F.E.A.R. 3 is that it has shields, which can significantly reduce incoming damage. However, when the shields are deployed, the rocket launchers cannot be used. Also new is a target lock system for the rockets, a melee attack, and a foot stomp that stuns enemies within a certain radius.

F.E.A.R. 3 also features an active cover system, the first game in the franchise to do so. When cover is available to the player, a command prompt will appear on-screen, allowing the player to snap to cover. Once in cover, the player can peer around or over their cover and can move around to a limited degree while staying snapped. If another piece of cover is nearby, the player can move from one piece to the other without having to leave cover. Players can also vault over cover and automatically spin 180 degrees to face in the opposite direction and target any enemies who have emerged behind them. Players are also capable of firing from within cover, both standard firing and unsighted firing over the top of the cover without being able to aim.

=== Multiplayer ===
The game's multiplayer, like co-op, is available both online and offline, via split-screen. There are four different multiplayer modes, each allowing for up to four players.

In "Soul King", all players have the possession ability and are unable to bear arms. To win, the player must possess enemy NPCs and collect their souls; the winner is the player with the most souls at the end of the match. As well as acquiring souls, when a player possesses an NPC, they get access to that NPC's weaponry, and thus the ability to kill the other players. Killing another player causes them to drop half of their souls, which then become available for other players to pick up. However, the player with the most souls at any given moment is highlighted via a glowing outline, making them an easy target.

"Contractions" is a co-op mode. Players must defend a base against a series of increasingly difficult enemy waves, working together to collect resources, construct barricades, and revive one another when necessary. Additionally, Alma is present on the battlefield, and if a player attacks her or keeps her in their sight for too long, that player dies.

In "F**king Run!", players must fight their way through enemies as they move towards an extraction point, all while running from Alma's "Wall of Death". If a player is killed by an NPC, their teammates can revive them, but if the Wall consumes any one player, the game is over for all players.

"Soul Survivor", like "Contractions", sees the players defending against waves of enemies. However, in this mode, one of the players is randomly corrupted by Alma at the commencement of the game, and that player's goal is to possess the other players before the time limit expires. When a player is possessed, they too become corrupted and work to possess the remaining players. To win the game, a player must survive until the end of the round without being possessed.

== Plot ==
The game begins nine months after the events of the first two games. Young Alma is shown sitting at a tree, playing with her doll. She pauses, listening for a moment, but then continues playing. Suddenly, there is a growl, and Alma becomes instantly terrified.

The game then cuts to a prison in Brazil where Armacham Technology Corporation (ATC) soldiers are interrogating Point Man. (Note: ATC's capture of Point Man and Point Man's first encounter with the reborn Fettel is depicted in the F.E.A.R. 3: Prelude comic.) As the interrogators demand to know the location of Jin Sun-Kwon, (Note: Jin Sun-Kwon's actions immediately after the helicopter crash which concluded the original game are depicted in the F.E.A.R. 2: Project Origin digital comic. Douglas Holiday's fate has never been addressed outside the non-canon F.E.A.R. Extraction Point and remains unresolved.) a red mist floats through the room's closed door, and possesses one of them, who then snaps the other's neck. Point Man immediately grabs a knife and slits the possessed interrogator's throat. The man's body falls to the ground, leaving only Fettel, surrounded by the red mist. (Note: How Fettel is present despite being killed in the original game is explained in the F.E.A.R. 2: Reborn DLC.) Point Man then sets out to rescue Jin, who is trapped in Fairport, and is joined by a reluctant Fettel, who is more concerned with Alma's pregnancy than Jin's fate.

The brothers escape the prison via the sewers and steal a helicopter, flying back to Fairport, unaware of how dangerous the city has become. As they approach the city, a wave of psychic energy hits the helicopter, forcing them to crash. As they move across the city, they discover that most of the population have either been driven insane by the paranormal activity or executed by ATC clean-up crews. Meanwhile, both men begin to catch glimpses and have hallucinations of a hideous creature. In one particular vision, the creature is about to attack a terrified Alma. Intermittently, they are also dragged into a fragment of memory from their childhood, when they were kept imprisoned in a lab by Harlan Wade and experimented upon.

Eventually, the brothers find Jin, although she cannot see Fettel. She tells Point Man that Sgt. Michael Becket of Delta Force is claiming he was raped by Alma and is the father of her unborn child. Given that Alma is pregnant, Jin speculates that the energy pulses may be her contractions rippling out across the world. With Becket held captive by ATC, he is due to be transported out of the city in a few hours, so the brothers head to intercept him. As the city literally collapses in on itself, they approach the airport. Finding a distraught Becket, Fettel possesses him, confirming he is telling the truth about his role in Alma's pregnancy and learning about Project Harbinger and the attempt to artificially create psychic commanders. However, the possession causes Becket to explode.

The brothers head to the facility where Harlan Wade kept them as children. There, as the creature stalks them, they begin destroying items associated with horrific memories from their childhood. As they do, they recall ATC scientists talking about how the first prototype (Point Man) was a failure but the second (Fettel) is perfect. They then remember that the creature is from their childhood. Called "the Creep", it is a monster manifested from the cruel actions of Harlan Wade towards the brothers and their subsequent psychological trauma.

They defeat the Creep and find Alma, who is moments away from giving birth. Point Man aims his pistol at her belly, but Fettel intervenes. They fight, and one of two endings occur, depending on which character has scored the most points across the game's challenge system. In Point Man's ending, he shoots Fettel in the head. He then aims his gun at Alma before lowering it, and helps her give birth. She then peacefully dies and Point Man learns from Jin that everything in the world has returned to normal. He then leaves with the baby. In Fettel's ending, Fettel possesses Point Man and extracts the baby. He vows to raise the child in his own image before cannibalizing Alma to acquire her power.

In a post-credits scene, security footage of the first Synchronicity Event is shown; Alma, although in a coma at the time, linked telepathically with the ten-year-old Fettel, causing him to go into a rage, in which he mutilates several ATC security officers using his psychic powers. Fettel is then heard in voiceover saying, "They deserved to die. They all deserved to die." He vows he won't stop until ATC is completely destroyed and he has achieved revenge for his mother.

== Development ==
=== Announcement ===
Warner Bros. Interactive Entertainment announced F.E.A.R. 3 for PC, PlayStation 3, and Xbox 360 in April 2010. The announcement revealed that both Point Man and Paxton Fettel would be playable characters and, for the first time in the F.E.A.R. franchise, there would be a co-op mode of gameplay. The press release also revealed that Monolith Productions, who had developed both the original F.E.A.R. and F.E.A.R. 2: Project Origin, would not be developing F.E.A.R. 3. Instead, the game was being developed by Day 1 Studios, who had handled the PlayStation 3 and Xbox 360 ports of the original game. Warner would later say that Monolith had "passed the torch" to Day 1. The game was scheduled for a third quarter 2010 release.

Warner also revealed that film director John Carpenter was working as a creative consultant for the game's cutscenes and script, which was being written by comic book author and novelist Steve Niles. Both men were fans of the franchise already, and Carpenter had previously done promotional work for the first game.

The following week, Warner released additional details about the game mechanics, explaining that the co-op mode would be "divergent", wherein players won't necessarily have to help one another and can, in fact, compete for bonuses. They also noted that the game would have a prominent semi-randomised system based on Left 4 Dead's "Director" system, but there was no information on exactly how this system would manifest in-game.

=== Origins ===
F.E.A.R. 3 originally began life as F.E.A.R. 2. In 2004, after the original F.E.A.R. had already begun development and a publishing deal struck with Vivendi, Monolith was purchased by Warner. This led to a copyright split whereby Monolith and Warner owned the rights to the F.E.A.R. intellectual property and characters, and Vivendi owned the name "F.E.A.R." As a result, any non-Vivendi game set in the F.E.A.R. universe could use the characters and events from the original game, but could not be called F.E.A.R. At the same time, any non-Warner game set in the F.E.A.R. universe could not use the characters and events from the original game, but could be called F.E.A.R.

In 2006, both Warner and Vivendi began development of their own sequel to the original game; Warner stuck with Monolith as developers whereas Vivendi hired Day 1. Thus, two rival sequels were in production at the same time - the Warner/Monolith game and the Vivendi/Day 1 game. The Day 1 game was loosely inspired by the Philadelphia Experiment, and was to depict a new phasing technology falling into the wrong hands and being used to open up a passage to and from a supernatural parallel universe called the World Behind the Walls. To close it, a F.E.A.R. squad is deployed.

In September 2008, 18 months into development on the Vivendi/Day 1 game, Monolith and Warner re-acquired the F.E.A.R. name from Vivendi, bringing all of the copyrights under one roof. Monolith continued development on their sequel, which now became the 'official' sequel (and could once again be called F.E.A.R.). When Warner looked at the work Day 1 had been doing for their version of F.E.A.R. 2, they suggested that the game could be moulded into F.E.A.R. 3. Day 1 began reworking the game from the ground up.

=== Writing ===
With Day 1 now having access to the established characters and events of the F.E.A.R. universe, they consulted with Monolith to ensure the F.E.A.R. 3 storyline was in line with Project Origin. It was Monolith who suggested that the game focuses on the relationship between Point Man and Fettel. Associate producer Jason Frederick said that the team felt obliged to work with Monolith, and to not do so would be "doing the fans a disservice." More specifically, producer Dan Hay said, "we brought the best parts of Monolith, their understanding of the F.E.A.R. franchise, and then we marry it with Day 1's expertise in mech combat and combat in general." Producer Ernest Zamora said that Monolith's involvement was crucial in terms of "making sure all of the tenets of F.E.A.R. were in place from the ground up."

The earliest iterations of the storyline for F.E.A.R. 3 (after it had ceased to be F.E.A.R. 2) were constructed by Stephen Dinehart (credited as "narrative designer" in the final game). His main role was to integrate into the existing framework the characters and events that Day 1 originally weren't allowed to use and to mould the concept for F.E.A.R. 2 so that it fit sequentially into the F.E.A.R. universe. According to Dinehart, "it wasn't really F.E.A.R., and suddenly the game had to be F.E.A.R., with all the characters and in alignment with the canon of the franchise." He says that when he joined the team, there was already a lot of burnout amongst the Day 1 people, as they had put a lot of work into their original concept for F.E.A.R. 2, and "basically they realised it was all for naught."

When it came time to write an actual script, Warner hired Niles over the objections of Day 1, who wanted to use Brian Keene. Niles had finished playing Project Origin just a month before he got the offer to write F.E.A.R 3, which he immediately accepted. At the same time, a project on which he had working with Carpenter recently fell through, and so he asked Warner if they'd be interested in bringing Carpenter on board, to which they said yes. Upon being hired, Niles immersed himself in the lore of the first two games, and set out to "turn the series into a trilogy; to really bring all the points of the games together into this game and answer a lot of questions."

Being unfamiliar with the technology behind video game design, having never worked on a game before, Niles treated the story as if it were a film. He wrote a conventionally formatted script;

we started, and at first they would show me the story and literally hand me a graph, because they're the tech people. So we had to come up with a way to work, and what I wound up doing was using Final Draft, which is what I write screenplays with. I said, "how about I just write the story? I write all the elements, I write the scenes and the dialogue, and all that stuff, and then you guys plug it into the tech and send it back to me and tell me what you need changed and additional dialogue."

Some of the Day 1 staff, however, do not have fond memories of working with Niles and Carpenter. According to associate producer Chris Julian, "John Carpenter did absolutely nothing. It was like we licensed his name and that was about it." He also criticised Niles for regularly being late turning in deliverables and for not keeping in touch with the designers as much as he should have; "it was a less than ideal relationship with both of them." Speaking of Niles, Dinehart said that much of what he turned in had to be rewritten by Day 1.

On the other hand, both Dinehart and narrative designer Cory Lanham said that Carpenter was involved, albeit limited to conference calls where he would listen to the team's ideas and give suggestions, occasionally advising on cutscenes and the script. Carpenter himself was never on-site and never met any of the Day 1 people in person. According to lead artist Heinz Schuller, "they wrote him a cheque to get his name on the game and they got some ideas from him. Probably."

=== Design and atmosphere ===
Officially, the main design principle when making F.E.A.R. 3 was to preserve the core F.E.A.R. mechanics and both enhance and expand upon them. Specifically, the team didn't want to "mess too much with the F.E.A.R. franchise's successful formula of frenetic soldier combat and paranormal horror." Behind the scenes, however, Day 1 initially wanted to make the game more like the original than the sequel - emphasising the survival horror elements, such as a dearth of ammo and medkits, and a real sense of being isolated and alone. However, according to Schuller, the then president of Warner Bros. Games, Martin Tremblay, had become a big fan of the Call of Duty games, and Day 1

started getting notes from [Warner] saying, "we really need epic moments, we want big out of control, world-coming-to-an-end type stuff." We were really taken aback because that was not the game we were making. We weren't making Call of Duty, we were making F.E.A.R., and F.E.A.R. is you against an unbelievably terrifying force. That completely changed the nature of the game, and hardcore fans will tell you right away, this was not a scary game.

In relation to the game's horror, the key element was the "generative scare system", which randomises the appearance of the game's apparitions, scares, and enemies. According to product manager Alex Friend, "you will never know what is going to happen next, or when it is going to happen." Hay explained, "the AI and scare moments are going to be reactive to how you play the game." Similarly, Frederick said the system "monitors the way you are playing the game and determines which scare events to trigger next." The system tracks the player's movements, where they are looking at any given moment, and which scares they have already seen. It then uses this data not just to determine what scare to use next, but where and how to use it.

Chris Julian was primarily responsible for the game's horror elements. He had a team of ten Day 1 personnel each of whom had experience with different types of horror. This group, called the "Scare Team" set themselves the goal of creating 10 to 15 really good scares to spread across the game. According to Julian, however, "once the co-op came down, horror pretty much went out the window."

=== Divergent co-op ===
In relation to the game's co-op, Hay explained that one of the benefits of the system is that Point Man and Fettel can combine their attacks to create a unique offensive unavailable to either one of them alone; "we thought maybe there could be a tie in with some of the powers, and how they work in conjunction with one another." However, the major selling point for the game's co-op system was not the benefit of teamwork, but what the developers referred to as "divergent co-op". Essentially, this means that players can compete for bonuses instead of simply assisting one another.

The key element in divergent co-op is the game's challenge system, which determines a player's ranking. If the players work together, the game is easier, but points for completing challenges are not split between each player. The hope was that this would lead to situations where players would start to actively compete for points, stealing kills from one another, and playing to try to maximise their own score. Behind the scenes, however, Day 1 had no real interest in making the game co-op, which was a decision made by Warner. According to Julian,

we had got the word from Warner that co-op was hot so we were making a co-op game. Our response was "co-op isn't frightening, co-op isn't scary when you're playing with somebody else." They didn't care because co-op was a buzzword in the industry at the time and they demanded we make a co-op. So we had to go back and retool all the levels to make them co-op compatible.

Similarly, programmer Matthew Singer states, "co-op hurt the scariness of the game, but none of us had control over that. It was decided from above that a co-op scoring system was going into place so at that stage, there's no point complaining about it, you just have to do it."

=== Single-player and multiplayer ===
A screenshot from the game mode "F**king Run!". Here, the player is running away from the Wall of Death.

Initially, the plan for the single-player campaign was to have Point Man as the only playable character, with Day 1 stating, "Fettel is a partner to Point Man, but the way we designed the game Point Man is the focus." In February 2011, however, it was revealed that the game had been altered, and players would also be able to play through each level as Fettel, but only after they had already completed that level as Point Man. The decision for the game's single player campaign not to feature an AI-controlled ally was met with some surprise, but Hay explained that they chose not to go this route so as to try to retain a horror element; "the F.E.A.R. franchise did a very good job of making you feel like you're alone in a basement, and we wanted to make sure that as you're playing the single-playing campaign, we leveraged that."

In relation to the game's multiplayer, the unique game modes, and the absence of traditional modes such as deathmatch and capture the flag, the team wanted to make the multiplayer component as close as possible to the tone of the single-player/co-op campaign, to make the modes quintessentially F.E.A.R.-like. According to Zamora, "what we set out to do was focus on making modes that are innovative and unique to the franchise. [We] focused on leveraging the F.E.A.R. brand."

=== Crunch, delays, and release ===
By late 2010, many of the staff, who had been working on the game for over four years, had burnt out. According to level designer Matt Mason, there were "many, many months" of "unofficial crunch", before the crunch became official with staff being told they had to work longer hours. There were multiple occasions when staff members wouldn't go home for several days, instead sleeping on site. According to Schuller, the game had 44 milestones, each of which involved a degree of crunch, whilst the last crunch consisted of eight months of 60-80 hour weeks. Multiple staff members quit during this period.

Mason says that one of the biggest problems was that there hadn't been enough scoping; "we needed to scope the game down to fit what we could actually do, but instead of that, we tried something that was about 50% more than that." According to Dinehart, "there was a lot of negative attitude about this game, which led to poor decision making. It was something which I won't blame on particular individuals, but maybe it was allowed to fester for longer than it should, and it became a very negative working environment."

Originally scheduled for a third-quarter 2010 release, in August 2010, the game was pushed back to an unspecified date in 2011. In October, it was given a world-wide release date for all platforms of March 22, 2011. Also announced at that time were three pre-order bonuses; players who preordered the game at Amazon would get a prequel comic, those who used Best Buy would get access to an exclusive multiplayer weapon called the "Shredder" that fires nitrate bullets, and those who used GameStop would give access to a multiplayer weapon called the "Hammer", a .50 caliber handgun. In January 2011, however, the game was pushed back again, this time to May. In March, the UK release was announced as May 27, although no North American date was specified. Then, in April, the game was delayed for a third time, and was now scheduled for June.

==== Collector's Edition ====
Announced in January 2011, the steel case Collector's Edition of F.E.A.R. 3 included an 18 cm pregnant Alma figure with a glow in the dark fetus, the F.E.A.R. 3: Prelude comic, and the unlockable in-game gun the Hammer.

==== Prelude ====
Available via Amazon pre-order and as part of the Collector's Edition of the game, F.E.A.R. 3: Prelude was written by Steve Niles, illustrated by Stefano Raffaele, and published by DC Comics. The comic serves as a prequel to the game, beginning with the helicopter crash which ends the original F.E.A.R. Point Man is thrown from the helicopter, and believing Jin to be dead, he takes off, unaware he is being followed by Fettel. Encountering a team of ATC soldiers, Point Man wipes them out, as Fettel, and then Alma reveal themselves. Point Man flees but he is captured by ATC. As they detain him, Fettel watches from nearby, laughing to himself.

== Reception ==
Reception

Aggregate score
Aggregator	Score		
Aggregator	PC	PS3	Xbox 360
Metacritic	74/100	74/100	75/100

Review scores
Publication	Score		
Publication	PC	PS3	Xbox 360
Eurogamer			8/10
Game Informer	7.75/10		
GameSpot	7.5/10	7.5/10	7.5/10
IGN	8/10		
PlayStation Official Magazine – Australia		6/10	
Official Xbox Magazine (UK)			7/10
Official Xbox Magazine (US)			8/10
PC Gamer (UK)	75/100		
PC Gamer (US)	74/100		
VideoGamer.com	7/10		

F.E.A.R. 3 received "mixed or average reviews," with the PC and PlayStation 3 versions holding aggregate scores of 74 out of 100 on Metacritic, based on 34 and 48 reviews, respectively. The Xbox 360 version holds a score of 75 out of 100, based on 71 reviews.

IGN's Colin Moriarty scored the PC version 8 out of 10, praising the combat mechanics and the "authentically chilling" atmosphere. He also praised the game for trying something new, citing co-op, the "incredibly thoughtful" multiplayer, and the "addicting" challenge system. Although he was critical of the graphics, he praised the sound design and music, concluding, "you won't find the be-all, end-all shooter experience with F.E.A.R. 3, but you're still bound to have a lot of fun." Eurogamer's Jeffrey Matulef scored the Xbox 360 version 8 out of 10 and was critical of the "subpar scares" and "shoddy narrative", arguing that the game is "comically ineffective at getting us to care." However, he praised the shooting mechanics, level design, "deceptively addictive" challenge system, co-op, and multiplayer. Ultimately, he found it to be "a finely crafted action game and an exceptionally inventive shooter."

Game Informer's Matt Bertz scored the PC version 7.75 out of 10. He was highly critical of the narrative, lack of scares, and the length of the campaign, but praised the "satisfying action." He was especially impressed with multiplayer. He concluded, "if you hardly pay attention to narratives and are looking for a fun multiplayer experience, F.E.A.R. 3 is worth checking out." GameSpot's Carolyn Petit scored all three versions 7.5 out of 10, criticizing the graphics and lack of scares, but praising the shooting mechanics, co-op, the different gameplay styles, and multiplayer. She argued that "while F.E.A.R. 3 may disappoint as a horror game, it satisfies as a shooter."

Tim Francis of PC Gamer (UK) scored it 75 out of 100. He was critical of the plot and lack of scares but praised multiplayer and the "remarkably well-built co-op." He found it to be "a passable single player game that's hilarious fun in co-op." Rob Zacny of PC Gamer (US) scored it 74 out of 100, arguing that the decision to go with co-op undermined the horror. Finding it to be "just another shooter," he argued, "there is no imagination or style here, just repeated blood-textures and shrill screams." However, he praised Fettel's gameplay and the multiplayer, concluding "the strong combat and clever mechanics save it from its own clumsy campaign." VideoGamer.com's Jamin Smith gave the game a 7 out of 10, concluding that "FEAR 3 is an enjoyable experience, but is sadly lacking in the fear department, and has subsequently lost its defining characteristic."

Cameron Lewis of Official Xbox Magazine (US) scored the Xbox 360 version 8 out of 10. He praised Fettle's "frantic" gameplay, and especially lauded multiplayer. He concluded, "F.E.A.R. 3 isn't expertly polished or perfectly balanced, but it's got sufficient creeping dread and more than enough gameplay variety." Edwin Evans-Thirlwell of Official Xbox Magazine (UK) scored it 7 out of 10. He praised the shooting mechanics and multiplayer, which "makes the ambition festering within Day 1 Studios immediately plain", but he criticised the story and lack of scares. He concluded, "bettering its predecessors in many respects, F.E.A.R. 3 falls well short of the mark in others."

Adam Mathew of Australia's PlayStation Official Magazine scored it 6 out of 10. He was critical of the inconsistent logic regarding Fettel (such as how he uses keyboards and opens doors but cannot pick up guns), and argued that "F.E.A.R. 3 has gone the decidedly unscary, action intensive route of Resident Evil 5. Calling it "solid, if stock-standard", he did praise the "halfway decent " multiplayer. He concluded, "it does nothing to stand out from the status quo. Judged in the context of the wider F.E.A.R. franchise, this co-op-infused test sacrifices too much of what made this series unique." Calum Wilson Austin of The Sydney Morning Herald praised the gameplay but was critical of the plot; "I would hate to see this entry be the death knell of the franchise [...] those looking for any resolution from the previous games will be sorely disappointed."
