= F.E.A.R. =

Video game series

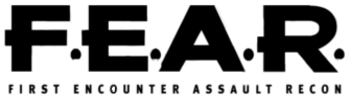
- Genres: First-person shooter, psychological horror
- Developers: Monolith Productions (F.E.A.R., F.E.A.R. 2); TimeGate Studios (Extraction Point, Perseus Mandate); Day 1 Studios (F.E.A.R. 3); Inplay Interactive (F.E.A.R. Online)
- Publishers: Vivendi Games (2005–2007); Warner Bros. Interactive Entertainment (2008–present)
- Creator: Craig Hubbard
- Platforms: PlayStation 3; Windows; Xbox 360
- First release: F.E.A.R. October 18, 2005
- Latest release: F.E.A.R. Online; October 17, 2014

F.E.A.R. is a first-person shooter psychological horror video game series created by Craig Hubbard in 2005. Released on Windows, PlayStation 3, and Xbox 360, there are three main games in the series; F.E.A.R. (2005), F.E.A.R. 2: Project Origin (2009), and F.E.A.R. 3 (2011). There are also two standalone expansion packs for the first game; F.E.A.R. Extraction Point (2006) and F.E.A.R. Perseus Mandate (2007), but these games are no longer considered canon, as their plots were ignored in Project Origin and F.E.A.R. 3. In 2014, F.E.A.R. Online, a free-to-play game, was released, but the servers were shut down in 2015 with the game still in open beta. Monolith Productions developed the original game and Project Origin; Day 1 Studios developed F.E.A.R. 3; TimeGate Studios developed Extraction Point and Perseus Mandate; Inplay Interactive developed F.E.A.R. Online. Initially, the series' publishing rights were owned by Vivendi Games, who published the original game and the two expansions under the Sierra Entertainment label. In 2008, Warner Bros. Interactive Entertainment acquired the publishing rights and went on to publish Project Origin and F.E.A.R. 3. Aeria Games published F.E.A.R. Online under license from Warner.

The original game is set in the city of Fairport in 2025 and follows the fictional F.E.A.R. (First Encounter Assault Recon) unit, an elite group in the United States Army tasked with investigating supernatural phenomena, as they probe a private military company's secret research program, which has resulted in the unintended release of a dangerous and powerful psychic. The player takes on the role of the unit's newest recruit, Point Man, as he faces down not only the psychic, but also a lethal and unpredictable paranormal menace in the form of a young girl, Alma Wade. Project Origin is set immediately after the conclusion of the first game, and follows Sgt. Michael Becket of Delta Force, who awakens in a strange hospital only to find that Alma, now free from her confinements, has taken a keen interest in him. F.E.A.R. 3 takes place nine months after the conclusion of Project Origin. Alma's pregnancy is nearing its end, and when a resurrected Paxton Fettel (the psychic from the first game) rescues Point Man from captivity, the two head back to Fairport, with Point Man determined to prevent Alma from giving birth. Fettel, however, has an entirely different motive.

All F.E.A.R. games are first-person shooters and feature several common guns, projectiles, and game mechanics, the most notable of which is "reflex time" (a slow motion technique that allows players to aim and shoot in real-time). With the exception of F.E.A.R. 3, the campaign in each game is single player-only. F.E.A.R. 3 can be played in either single-player or co-op mode. F.E.A.R. 3 is also the only game to offer the player a choice as to the playable character.

Critical reactions to the games have been mixed, although leaning positive. The original game received very strong reviews and went on to be celebrated as a defining title in the FPS genre, both for its mechanics and its innovations in AI technology. Subsequent games in the series were not as well-received; whilst their mechanics were generally lauded, a common complaint has been that the series' psychological horror elements have lost potency with each entry. The original game sold very well, but after F.E.A.R. 3 failed to meet commercial expectations, the mainline series has been on hiatus.

== Games ==
Release timeline
2005	F.E.A.R. First Encounter Assault Recon
2006	F.E.A.R. Extraction Point
2007	F.E.A.R. Perseus Mandate
2008
2009	F.E.A.R. 2: Project Origin
2009	F.E.A.R. 2: Reborn
2010
2011	F.E.A.R. 3
2012
2013
2014	F.E.A.R. Online

- F.E.A.R. First Encounter Assault Recon was developed by Monolith Productions for Microsoft Windows and published by Vivendi Games, under the Sierra Entertainment label. Released in October 2005, it was made available in both a standard edition and a Director's Edition, which included both a CD-ROM and DVD version of the game, a Dark Horse comic prequel, a live-action prequel, a "Making of F.E.A.R." documentary, a one-hour "Developers' commentary", and an episode of a promotional machinima. It was ported to the Xbox 360 in October 2006 and to the PlayStation 3 in April 2007, with both ports developed by Day 1 Studios and published by Vivendi. In March 2007, F.E.A.R. Gold Edition was released on PC, containing all the content from the Director's Edition, plus the Extraction Point expansion pack. In November, F.E.A.R. Platinum Collection was released, containing all the content from the Gold Edition plus the Perseus Mandate expansion pack. The complete F.E.A.R. series was released on Steam in July 2012, the Platinum Collection was released on GOG.com in February 2015, and the entire franchise was added to Microsoft's backward compatibility program, making the games playable on the Xbox One and Xbox Series X/S, in November 2021.
- F.E.A.R. Extraction Point, a standalone expansion pack for the original game, was developed by TimeGate Studios and published by Vivendi, under the Sierra Entertainment label. Originally released for PC in October 2006, it was later included in both the Gold Edition and Platinum Collection re-releases of the game. It was released for Xbox 360 in November 2007, although was only available bundled with the Perseus Mandate expansion, under the collective name F.E.A.R. Files. The complete F.E.A.R. series was released on Steam in July 2012, the Platinum Collection was released on GOG.com in February 2015, and the entire franchise was added to Microsoft's backward compatibility in November 2021.
- F.E.A.R. Perseus Mandate, a second standalone expansion pack for the original game, was developed by TimeGate Studios and published by Vivendi, under the Sierra Entertainment label. Released for PC and Xbox in November 2007, it was made available for PC in both a standard edition and as part of the Platinum Collection re-release of the game. On Xbox 360, it was only available bundled with the Extraction Point expansion, under the collective name F.E.A.R. Files. The complete F.E.A.R. series was released on Steam in July 2012, the Platinum Collection was released on GOG.com in February 2015, and the entire franchise was added to Microsoft's backward compatibility in November 2021.
- F.E.A.R. 2: Project Origin, which ignores the events of both expansions, was developed by Monolith for Microsoft Windows, PlayStation 3, and Xbox 360, and was published by Warner Bros. Interactive Entertainment in February 2009. In September 2009, Monolith released a single-player DLC pack, F.E.A.R. 2: Reborn, which continued the story. The complete F.E.A.R. series was released on Steam in July 2012, both Project Origin and Reborn were made available on GOG.com in March 2015, and the entire franchise was added to Microsoft's backward compatibility in November 2021.
- F.E.A.R. 3 was developed by Day 1 Studios for Microsoft Windows, PlayStation 3, and Xbox 360, and was published by Warner Bros. Interactive Entertainment in June 2011. It was released on Steam in July 2012 as part of the complete F.E.A.R. series. The entire F.E.A.R. franchise, including F.E.A.R. 3, was added to Microsoft's backward compatibility in November 2021.
- F.E.A.R. Online, a free-to-play online multiplayer shooter, was developed by InPlay Interactive and published by Aeria Games, under license from Warner Bros. Interactive Entertainment. The storyline of the game runs parallel to Project Origin. It entered closed beta in May 2014, and open beta in October. The servers were shut down in May 2015 with the game still in open beta.

== Gameplay overview ==
All games in the F.E.A.R. series are first-person shooters and all share multiple game mechanics. In the first game and F.E.A.R. Extraction Point, the only playable character is Point Man; in F.E.A.R. Perseus Mandate, the player controls an unnamed F.E.A.R. sergeant; in F.E.A.R. 2: Project Origin, the player controls Sgt. Michael Becket of Delta Force; in F.E.A.R. 3, which can be played in either single player or co-op modes, the player can control both Point Man and Paxton Fettel, one of the antagonists of the original game.

When the player is controlling Point Man, the sergeant, or Becket, gameplay is very similar, irrespective of which game is being played. Common weaponry across all games includes handguns, assault rifles, submachine guns, shotguns, sniper rifles, nail guns, and rocket launchers. Other weapons available in the games include repeating cannons, particle beams, miniguns, laser carbines, grenade launchers, night vision rifles, lightning arcs, flamethrowers, pulse rifles, and machine pistols. The player also has access to various projectiles. Frag genades are common across all games, whilst other types of projectiles include proximity grenades, remote bombs, deplyable turrets, incendiary grenades, shock grenades (electricity-based), flash bangs, and zap grenades (electricity-based). Point Man, the sergeant, and Becket also have limited melee abilities; punch, kick, jumping kick, sliding tackle, and using the butts of their guns in hand-to-hand combat. In F.E.A.R. 3, Point Man also has a knife for use in close combat.

Point Man uses reflex time in the PC version of the first game. Note the visual distortions representing the bullet trails.

A prominent gameplay element in all F.E.A.R. games is "reflex time"; an ability which slows down the game world while still allowing the player to aim and react at normal speeds. This effect is used to simulate the player character's superhuman reflexes, and is represented by stylized visual effects, such as bullets in flight that cause air distortion or interact with the game's particle system. In all games, the duration which reflex time lasts is limited, determined by a meter which slowly fills up automatically when the ability is not being used. In all games except F.E.A.R. 3, the player can permanently increase the size of the reflex meter by picking up reflex boosters.

In F.E.A.R. 3, Fettel attacks an enemy in his normal form, suspending the NPC in mid-air.

In F.E.A.R. 3, the player only has access to reflex time when playing as Point Man. When playing as Fettel, the player has access to a possession ability which allows Fettel to take control of an enemy NPC, who then becomes the playable character. When Fettel possesses an NPC, he gains access to any abilities and weaponry wielded by that individual, meaning that although the player cannot use guns when playing directly as Fettel, they can use guns when Fettel possesses gun-wielding enemies. Once in possession of an NPC, the player has a limited amount of time before the possession ends and the player returns to controlling Fettel. The player also has the option to manually end possession at any time. The player can permanently increase the size of the reflex time/possession meter via the game's ranking system, which is based on completing various challenges. Completing a challenge awards points, and when enough points have been accrued, the player's rank increases. Each rank progression gives the player an award, such as increasing the size of the meter, unlocking new melee abilities, increasing ammo and grenade capacity, or allowing the player's health to regenerate faster.

Introduced in Project Origin is the ability to use a heavily armored mechs, called an Elite Power Armor (EPA) in-game. In Project Origin, EPAs are armed with two miniguns and two shoulder-mounted rocket launchers. Ammo for each is infinite, but the miniguns overheat if fired continuously, and require a short cool-down period. Similarly, the rocket launchers require a moment to arm. EPAs also have fully regenerative health and an optional night vision display that allows the player to easily discern heat signatures. In F.E.A.R. 3, there are two types of mech available; the REV9 Powered Armor and the Enhanced Power Armor (EPA). The REV9 is armed with two burst cannons and a head-mounted raygun. The EPA has two miniguns and a shoulder-mounted rocket launcher. Ammo is infinite for all weapons, but the cannons/miniguns overheat if fired continuously, and require a short cool-down period. Similarly, the raygun/rocket launchers require a moment to arm. Both mechs also have fully regenerative health and shields, which can significantly reduce incoming damage. However, when the shields are deployed, the rocket launchers cannot be used.

Unique to F.E.A.R. 3 is an active cover system. When cover is available to the player, a command prompt will appear on-screen, allowing the player to snap to cover. Once in cover, the player can peer around or over their cover and can move around to a limited degree while staying snapped. If another piece of cover is nearby, the player can move from one piece to the other without having to leave cover. Players can also vault over cover and automatically spin 180 degrees to face in the opposite direction and target any enemies who have emerged behind them.

=== Multiplayer ===
The original game's multiplayer features deathmatch, team deathmatch, elimination, team elimination, capture the flag, "Control", and "Conquer All". It also features game types specifically designed to allow players to use reflex time; SlowMo deathmatch, team SlowMo deathmatch, and SlowMo capture the flag. These game types feature a reflex time power-up, which only one player can carry at a time, and when it is fully charged (it charges when it is being carried) that player can activate it and give themselves (and the rest of their team, if applicable) a considerable speed advantage over opposing players. However, whoever is carrying the power-up will have a bluish glow and will be permanently visible on all players' mini-maps.

In August 2006, F.E.A.R.'s multiplayer component was re-released on PC as a free download under the name F.E.A.R. Combat. Incorporating the latest multiplayer patches, all ten gameplay modes, and all nineteen maps, F.E.A.R. Combat was compatible with the original PC retail edition's multiplayer, meaning those with only the download could play with those who own the full game.

Project Origin's multiplayer features deathmatch, team deathmatch, "Control", "Armored Front" (similar to Control, but control points must be captured in a specific order, and each team also has access to an EPA), "Failsafe" (one team is tasked with planting and detonating a bomb, the other team with preventing them), "Blitz" (a capture the flag game), and SloMo Deathmatch.

F.E.A.R. 3's multiplayer features four different multiplayer modes. In "Soul King", all players have the possession ability and are unable to bear arms. To win, the player must possess enemy NPCs and collect their souls; the winner is the player with the most souls at the end of the match. In "Contractions", players must defend a base against a series of increasingly difficult enemy waves. In "F**king Run!", players must fight their way through enemies as they move towards an extraction point, all while running from Alma's "Wall of Death". If a player is killed by an NPC, their teammates can revive them, but if the Wall consumes any one player, the game is over for all players. In "Soul Survivor", players defend against waves of enemies, but in this mode, one of the players is randomly corrupted at the commencement of the game, and that player's goal is to possess the other players before the time limit expires. When a player is possessed, they too become corrupted and work to possess the remaining players. To win the game, a player must survive until the end of the round without being possessed.

== Development ==
=== F.E.A.R. ===
F.E.A.R. was announced for Microsoft Windows at E3 2003. The foundational concept was to make a game where the player felt like the hero of an action film. This led to the development of reflex time, with Writer, director, and lead designer Craig Hubbard stating that he wanted "to make combat as intense as the tea house shootout at the beginning of John Woo's Hard Boiled". Defeating "enemies with style" was crucial to this. Another key influence was the Wachowskis' The Matrix (1999). In particular, the lobby scene was the team's initial point of reference for how the game's combat should look and feel. In a 2008 interview, Hubbard explained,

we were setting out to make a really over-the-top John Woo style action movie with the intense combat. Combat is something all shooters have, but we felt that nobody had quite nailed that sense you get in a John Woo movie of just the insanity.

As well as its core first-person shooter gameplay, F.E.A.R. is also a psychological horror, and was specifically influenced by Japanese horror, with the developers citing films such as Ring (1998), Memento Mori (1999), Pulse (2001), The Eye (2002), Ju-On: The Grudge (2002), and Dark Water (2002), as well as Koji Suzuki's 1991 novel Ring (on which the 1998 film was based). The main source of the game's horror is Alma Wade. In terms of influences, she is often assumed to have been inspired by Samara from The Ring (the American remake of Ring). Hubbard, however, explains that Alma "was born out of a tradition of eerie, faceless female ghosts" and not "as an answer to any specific movie character". Although he does acknowledge that Alma "bears some visual resemblance to the ghosts in Dark Water or Séance", he points out that "creepy little girls have been freaking [him] out since The Shining". Alma was named after Alma Mobley from Peter Straub's novel Ghost Story (1979).

The game's AI was the culmination of work which Monolith Productions had begun with The Operative: No One Lives Forever (2000) and No One Lives Forever 2: A Spy in H.A.R.M.'s Way (2002). In developing the AI routines, the team's main goal was to try to match the NPCs' intelligence with the player's skill level. According to Jeff Orkin, senior AI engineer, "our goal is not to have the players dominated by the AI, but we want them to learn to respect the AI so much that even the easy kills provide a sense of accomplishment."

F.E.A.R. was the first video game to use "GOAP" (Goal Oriented Action Planning). GOAP is a STRIPS-based architecture that allows enemies more autonomy than simply reacting to the player. Instead, they decide on a goal from a list of options and do not have to be programmed on plan how best to reach that goal. Orkin explains that "with a planning system, we can just toss in goals and actions. We never have to manually specify the transitions between these behaviors. The AI figures out the dependencies themselves at run-time based on the goal state and the preconditions and effects of actions." This is manifested in the gameplay insofar as,

a character that formulates his own plan to satisfy his goals exhibits less repetitive, predictable behavior and can adapt his actions to custom-fit his current situation. Goals in GOAP are not created with a hard-coded plan. Instead, GOAP simply defines the conditions necessary to satisfy a goal, and the character determines the steps to satisfy this goal in real-time. With this structure, the AI is able to dynamically replan to react to environmental factors. If a situation changes, the NPC recognizes this because the steps planned to accomplish his goal are no longer valid. When a plan becomes invalid, the NPC reassesses the situation and either finds alternate means for accomplishing the goal or activates a different goal.

The Xbox 360 version of the game was announced in May 2006, with Day 1 Studios handling the port. Graphically, the Xbox 360 version was equivalent to the PC version on maximum settings and Day 1 also increased the native resolution to 720p and added high dynamic range lighting, an advanced particle system, and HD textures. The Xbox version also features an exclusive bonus level not found in the PC original, as well as an exclusive new weapon. The PlayStation 3 port was announced in August 2006 as a March 2007 launch title (although it would ultimately be pushed back to April). Like the Xbox 360 version, the PlayStation 3 port was developed by Day 1 Studios. This version also has its own exclusive additional level and weapon. Like the Xbox version, the game's native resolution was increased to 720p, but the other enhancements were removed for this version.

=== Extraction Point and Perseus Mandate ===
F.E.A.R. Extraction Point was announced for Microsoft Windows in May 2006, with TimeGate Studios working on development. Due to uncertainty regarding rights (Monolith had been purchased by Warner Bros. Games in 2004, and owned the rights to the intellectual property and characters, but Vivendi Games still owned the name "F.E.A.R."), it was stated in a press release that the plot for Extraction Point had been approved by Monolith and was in line with their own plans for a full sequel, which they had announced in February.

During the promotion of the game, producer Tim Hall explained that in making Extraction Point, the designers were keen to address some of the common criticisms of the base game. Hall explained that because one of the main criticisms of the first game was that the levels were too repetitive and enclosed, the team had ensured to include more aesthetically varied environments, especially large outdoor sections. He clarified, "we wanted to not only give the player more of the fun factor of F.E.A.R. but also to address any criticisms that players had - yes we have heard the office layout one a million times - so we changed things up a little. With Extraction Point we not only have that same fun close quarters combat but we have also added in some much larger areas for some fun ranged combat as well."

F.E.A.R. Perseus Mandate was announced in July 2007, when it was revealed that the Xbox 360 version of the game would be bundled with F.E.A.R. Extraction Point (previously only available on PC) and released under the name F.E.A.R. Files. Developers TimeGate Studios revealed that the game would not be a narrative sequel to Extraction Point, but a sidequel to the base game and the first expansion, focusing on a different F.E.A.R. team. They also stressed that the player would be accompanied for much of the game by an AI companion, a design decision made after the section in Extraction Point where Point Man is joined by a colleague received very positive feedback. Originally, the plan was to release F.E.A.R. Files on both PlayStation 3 and Xbox 360, but the PlayStation version was cancelled.

==== Canonicity ====
As of 2008, neither Extraction Point nor Perseus Mandate is considered canon in the F.E.A.R. universe insofar as Project Origin disregards the events of both, acting instead as a direct sequel to the original game. Initial reports were that Monolith had given the expansions' storylines their blessing, and that they were in line with their own in-development sequel. However, in December 2008, a year after the release of Perseus Mandate and a few months before the release of Project Origin, Dave Matthews, Project Origin's lead artist, explained that the expansions

were made outside of Monolith and they took the story in a very different direction than we had intended, so when we started working on F.E.A.R. 2, there was a very difficult decision. Did we try to figure out and change the story with what we were trying to tell with Alma, and incorporate the story arc with what goes on between Extraction Point and Perseus Mandate? That's when we decided to treat it as if it were a 'what if?' or an alternate spin because we thought it would be of merit to the story if it remained pure.

=== Project Origin ===
F.E.A.R. 2: Project Origin was announced by Monolith in February 2006. Monolith had been purchased by Warner in 2004, after development of the original F.E.A.R was already underway and a publishing deal had already been struck with Vivendi. By 2006, although Monolith and Warner owned the rights to the F.E.A.R. intellectual property and characters, but Vivendi still owned the name "F.E.A.R." As a result, any non-Vivendi game set in the F.E.A.R. universe could use the characters and events from the original, but could not be called F.E.A.R. At the same time, any non-Warner game set in the F.E.A.R. universe could not use the characters and events from the original game, but could be called F.E.A.R.

In May 2006, Vivendi announced that an expansion pack for the first game was being developed and the press release clarified that the plot for the expansion had been approved by Monolith. However, in December 2008, Monolith officially confirmed what had long been suspected; despite initial reports that they had approved the story and that that story was in line with their own plans, in fact, that sequel would ignore the events of both expansions and instead serve as a canonical follow-up to the original game. In September 2008, Monolith Productions and Warner re-acquired the F.E.A.R. name from Vivendi.

Originally, the plan for Project Origin was to release two completely different games - one for PC, and one for Xbox 360 and PlayStation 3, with Monolith president Samantha Ryan stating, "in addition to continuing the series on PC, we're committed to bringing it to next-generation consoles by creating separate titles tailored to each audience." This plan was never realised and in December 2008, Craig Hubbard explained that the two titles "just merged."

One of Monolith's main goals with Project Origin was to successfully tackle the biggest criticisms of the original game - the bland and repetitive environments, and the lack of enemy variety. Co-lead designer John Mulkey explained that "variety" in a general sense was one of the main guiding principals as the team strove for "more visual variety, more variety in enemies and in gameplay experiences." Mulkey, who was lead level designer on the first game, acknowledged that although that game was claustrophobic by design, the interiors were too similar, and so, "we've decided to mix it up and to have these more open spaces." For the sequel, Monolith wanted to have the game take place across multiple, visually differentiated, locations.

In terms of enemy variety, the team endeavored to create not just aesthetically differentiated enemies, but "new AI types that have different tactics." Indeed, the creation of new locations and new enemies unexpectedly dovetailed into one another. As Mulkey explains, "as we started to change the volume of the space the combat altered, and it gave us new opportunities to approach the AI in different ways, educate them with different activities and abilities."

Much as the first game's atmosphere was heavily inspired by certain films, so too with the sequel. Matthews names films such as Timur Bekmambetov's Nightwatch (2004) and Daywatch (2006), Alexandre Aja's Haute tension (2003), and the Saw franchise as especially important inspirations for the game's atmosphere. In relation to Saw, he explained the designers were trying to capture, "that response that happens in your body when you realise you're going to have to do something horrible, or something much worse is going to happen".

A cutscene from Project Origin; one of the scenes in the game in which Alma has a much more central role than she did in the original F.E.A.R.

One of the central elements of the game's atmosphere would be Alma, who had a much more involved role in the sequel than in the original. By way of this increased presence, Monolith intended to enhance the game's horror; "we've put a lot of effort and a lot of thought into the ways in which we can give Alma teeth." Hubbard also pointed out that Alma has "a stronger agenda, which gives her a more active, visceral role." Speaking of the balance between combat and horror, Hubbard reminded people that "this is first and foremost an action game. There are horror elements, but it's not meant to be an unrelenting experience in terror." With this in mind, Monolith were attempting to strike a similar balance as in the first game;

we have always perceived close-quarters combat as the centerpiece of the game, and the horror as a secondary element that helps to set up future combat scenarios. [...] The relationship between the two is that the horror elements are a palette cleanser that resets the player's emotional state, and allows the kinetic aspects of the next combat to land with more force.

=== F.E.A.R. 3 ===
F.E.A.R. 3 originally began life as F.E.A.R. 2. In 2006, with the rights still split between Warner and Vivendi, each company began development of their own sequel to the original game; Warner stuck with Monolith as developers whereas Vivendi hired Day 1. Thus, two rival sequels were in production at the same time - the Warner/Monolith game and the Vivendi/Day 1 game. In September 2008, 18 months into development on the Vivendi/Day 1 game, Monolith and Warner re-acquired the F.E.A.R. name, bringing all of the copyrights under one roof. Monolith continued development on their sequel, which now became the 'official' sequel. When Warner looked at the work Day 1 had been doing for their version of F.E.A.R. 2, they suggested that the game could be moulded into F.E.A.R. 3, and so Day 1 began reworking the game from the ground up.

To write the script, Warner hired Steve Niles over the objections of Day 1, who wanted to use Brian Keene. At the same time, a project on which he had been working with John Carpenter had recently fallen through, and so he asked Warner if they'd be interested in bringing Carpenter on board as well, to which they said yes. Some of the Day 1 staff, however, do not have fond memories of working with Niles and Carpenter. According to associate producer Chris Julian, "John Carpenter did absolutely nothing. It was like we licensed his name and that was about it." On the other hand, narrative designers Stephen Dinehart and Cory Lanham said that Carpenter was involved, albeit limited to conference calls where he would listen to the team's ideas and give suggestions, occasionally advising on cutscenes and the script. Carpenter himself was never on-site and never met any of the Day 1 people in person. According to lead artist Heinz Schuller, "they wrote him a cheque to get his name on the game and they got some ideas from him. Probably."

Officially, the team's main design principle was to avoid messing "too much with the F.E.A.R. franchise's successful formula of frenetic soldier combat and paranormal horror." Behind the scenes, however, Day 1 initially wanted to make the game more like the original than the sequel - emphasising the survival horror elements, such as a dearth of ammo and medkits, and a real sense of being isolated and alone. However, according to Schuller, the then president of Warner Bros. Games, Martin Tremblay, had become a big fan of the Call of Duty games, and Day 1

started getting notes from [Warner] saying, "we really need epic moments, we want big out of control, world-coming-to-an-end type stuff." We were really taken aback because that was not the game we were making. We weren't making Call of Duty, we were making F.E.A.R., and F.E.A.R. is you against an unbelievably terrifying force. That completely changed the nature of the game, and hardcore fans will tell you right away, this was not a scary game.

Chris Julian was primarily responsible for the game's horror elements. He had a team of ten Day 1 personnel each of whom had experience with different types of horror. This group, called the "Scare Team" set themselves the goal of creating 10 to 15 really good scares to spread across the game. According to Julian, however, "once the co-op came down, horror pretty much went out the window." He said that Day 1 had no real interest in making the game co-op, but

we had got the word from Warner that co-op was hot so we were making a co-op game. Our response was "co-op isn't frightening, co-op isn't scary when you're playing with somebody else." They didn't care because co-op was a buzzword in the industry at the time and they demanded we make a co-op. So we had to go back and retool all the levels to make them co-op compatible.

By late 2010, many of the staff, who had been working on the game for over four years, had burnt out. According to level designer Matt Mason, there were "many, many months" of "unofficial crunch", before the crunch became official with staff being told they had to work longer hours. According to Schuller, the game had 44 milestones, each of which involved a degree of crunch, whilst the last crunch consisted of eight months of 60-80 hour weeks. Multiple staff members quit during this period.

== Other media ==
P.A.N.I.C.S.

In the lead-up to the first game's release in October 2005, episodes were released online of a comedy miniseries created by Rooster Teeth and distributed by BeSeen Communications. P.A.N.I.C.S. (People Acting Normal In Crazy-Ass Situations) is a parody of F.E.A.R., produced primarily by way of the machinima technique of synchronizing footage created by a game engine (in this case, the LithTech Jupiter EX) to pre-recorded dialogue and audio effects. Vivendi commissioned Rooster Teeth and BeSeen to make the series as a viral marketing campaign, with Lori Inman, Vivendi's Senior Brand Manager, stating, "with F.E.A.R. we knew we had a very special title combining a cutting edge FPS engine with a spine-tingling storyline. We liked the idea of creating a humorous viral machinima series that would entertain fans and showcase the spectacular visuals and character animations offered in the game."

Alma Interview

Set several years before the main game, and included with the Director's Edition of the game, "Alma Interview" is a live-action short depicting four snippets from an interview with the seven-year-old Alma in the lead up to her being placed in Project Origin.

F.E.A.R. comic

Included with the Director's Edition of the original game, the F.E.A.R. comic was written by Alden Freewater, with art by Edwin David, and published by Dark Horse. It takes place moments before the game begins and expands on the game's opening cutscene.

F.E.A.R. 2: Project Origin digital comic

Created by DC Comics, and released on GameTrailers on October 31, 2008, the F.E.A.R. 2: Project Origin digital comic is an animated 73-second clip depicting the aftermath of the helicopter crash from the end of the first game.

Armacham Field Guide

Included with a limited steel box edition of Project Origin available only by preordering the game from GameStop, Armacham Field Guide is a primer detailing much of the background mythology behind the F.E.A.R. games. The book recounts the events of the first game, as well as expanding on Alma's history. It also includes information on the various characters and weaponry from each game. The book is littered with handwritten notations, composed shortly before the second game begins.

F.E.A.R. 3: Prelude

Available via Amazon pre-order and as part of the Collector's Edition of the game, F.E.A.R. 3: Prelude was written by Steve Niles, illustrated by Stefano Raffaele, and published by DC Comics. The comic serves as a prequel to the game, beginning with the helicopter crash which ends the original F.E.A.R.

== Reception ==
Aggregate review scores
Game	Year	Metacritic
F.E.A.R.	2005	88/100 (PC); 72/100 (PS3); 85/100 (X360)
F.E.A.R. Extraction Point	2006	75/100 (PC); 66/100 (X360)
F.E.A.R. Perseus Mandate	2007	61/100 (PC); 66/100 (X360)
F.E.A.R. 2: Project Origin	2009	79/100 (PC); 79/100 (PS3); 77/100 (X360)
F.E.A.R. 3	2011	74/100 (PC); 74/100 (PS3); 75/100 (X360)

The PC version of the original game received very positive reviews, with the AI garnering especial praise. Critics also lauded the graphics, atmosphere, sound design, music, and combat mechanics. Common points of criticism were a lack of enemy variety, a weak plot, and repetitive level design. IGN's Tom McNamara called it "one of the best shooters this year". GameSpot's Jason Ocampo said it "elevates the genre to a whole new level of intensity". Eurogamer's Tom Bramwell called it "fresh and compelling." Game Informer's Adam Biessener praised the "smartest AI-controlled opponents I've ever faced" and called the combat mechanics "intense almost to the point of sensory overload".

The Xbox 360 port also received generally positive reviews. IGN's Eric Brudvig wrote, "F.E.A.R. has made it from the PC to 360 with everything that made it an outstanding experience." Eurogamer's Kristen Reed argued that "it gets the core of the experience so absolutely spot-on." GameSpot's Jason Ocampo called it "easily one of the most intense and atmospheric games on the Xbox 360."

The PlayStation 3 port received less positive reviews, with many critics unimpressed with the port's technical issues and graphical inferiority, although they still lauded the game mechanics. IGN's Greg Miller wrote, "the PS3 doesn't hold a candle to the visuals found in the Xbox 360 version", but called it "still one of the best experiences I've had on a PS3". GameSpot's Jason Ocampo argued that it "lacks the level of polish and atmosphere seen in the previous two versions." Electronic Gaming Monthly's Joe Rybicki called it "a tragedy", citing "inexcusable technical issues", and finding it to be "one of the most reprehensible ports in recent memory."

The PC version of Extraction Point also received positive reviews, with critics praising its fidelity to the base game. Common criticisms included a lack of replay value, a short campaign, and a failure to innovate or try anything really new. Game Informer's Adam Biessener praised it for "[retaining] every single good element that was present [in the base game]". Xplay's Jason D'Aprile called it "a worthy gun fix." GameSpot's Jason Ocampo argued, "TimeGate deserves plenty of credit for maintaining the intensity of the original". IGN's Charles Onyett found it a little too similar to the original; "you may at times be fooled into thinking you're playing the first F.E.A.R."

The PC version of Perseus Mandate received mixed reviews with critics praising the mechanics, but criticising the dated graphics and the game's similarity to previous titles. PALGN's Neil Booth criticised it for not "deviating one inch from the formula", finding it "so familiar that an air of been-there-done-that sucks a lot of the life out." IGN's Dan Adams wrote, "if you're looking for something new or compelling and some flashy sound or visuals, don't bother. GameSpot's Jason Ocampo wrote, "it's difficult to play this expansion without feeling that you're doing the exact same things that you've done countless times before."

Project Origin received positive reviews but some critics felt it to be inferior to the first game. Common points of praise included the mechanics, sound effects, graphics and mech sections, and enemy variety. Less enthusiastically received were the plot, cover mechanics, horror elements, and some of the gameplay changes from the original. Several critics also felt it took too few risks and was little more than a generic, albeit well-made, shooter. IGN's Jason Ocampo called it "a good shooter, bordering on great", but acknowledged, "it's not as groundbreaking as its predecessor." GameSpot's Kevin VanOrd felt that it "seems to have lost sight of the strengths that made its predecessor so unique." PC Zone's Steve Hogarth argued "Project Origin falls short of delivering the kick provided by the original." Eurogamer's Kieron Gillen was especially unimpressed, finding the game to be "a checklist of genre-tropes" and "as archetypal a corridor-shooter as has ever been made."

F.E.A.R. 3 received mixed reviews. Critics generally lauded the multiplayer, co-op, and the mechanics, but were unimpressed with the plot, the absence of any real horror, and the short length of the campaign. Many critics felt that although it was a solid, if by-the-numbers, first-person shooter, it failed as a F.E.A.R. game. Eurogamer's Jeffrey Matulef was critical of the "subpar scares" and "shoddy narrative", but found it to be "a finely crafted action game." GameSpot's Carolyn Petit argued that "while F.E.A.R. 3 may disappoint as a horror game, it satisfies as a shooter." Adam Mathew of Australia's PlayStation Official Magazine called it "solid, if stock-standard". Calum Wilson Austin of The Sydney Morning Herald wrote, "I would hate to see this entry be the death knell of the franchise."

=== Sales and awards ===
The original game was a commercial success. By the time the game was released on PlayStation 3 in April 2007, the combined worldwide sales of the PC and Xbox 360 versions were over two million units. The PlayStation 3 version itself was the console's best selling title in April, moving 45,864 units in North America.

F.E.A.R. won Computer Games Magazine's 2005 "Best Sound Effects" award, and was a runner-up for their list of the year's 10 best PC games. It won 2005's "Best Action Game" from both the Game Critics Awards and PC Gamer US. GameSpy awarded it their 2005 "Best Story" award. In GameSpot's 2005 annual awards, it won "Best AI" and "Best Graphics (Technical)". At the 4th Annual Game Audio Network Guild Awards in 2006, it shared the "Best Use of Multi-Channel Surround" with Call of Duty 2.

Extraction Point won PC Gamer's 2006 "Best Expansion Pack" award.
