= F.E.A.R. 2: Project Origin =

2009 video game

- Developer: Monolith Productions
- Publisher: Warner Bros. Games
- Directors: Nathan Hendrickson; Peter Wyse
- Producer: Troy Skinner
- Designers: John Mulkey; Craig Hubbard
- Programmer: John O'Rourke
- Artist: Dave Matthews
- Writer: Craig Hubbard
- Composer: Nathan Grigg
- Series: F.E.A.R.
- Engine: LithTech Jupiter EX
- Platforms: PlayStation 3; Windows; Xbox 360
- Release: NA: February 10, 2009; AU: February 12, 2009; EU: February 13, 2009
- Genres: First-person shooter, psychological horror
- Modes: Single-player, multiplayer

F.E.A.R. 2: Project Origin is a 2009 first-person shooter psychological horror video game for PlayStation 3, Windows, and Xbox 360. Developed by Monolith Productions and published by Warner Bros. Games., it was released for all platforms in February 2009. It is the second game in the F.E.A.R. series and is followed by F.E.A.R. 3. In September 2009, Monolith released a single-player DLC pack, F.E.A.R. 2: Reborn. In March 2015, both the base game and Reborn were made available on GOG.com. In November 2021, the F.E.A.R. franchise, including Reborn, was added to Microsoft's backward compatibility program, making the games playable on the Xbox One and Xbox Series X/S. Project Origin ignores the events of both TimeGate Studios-developed expansion packs for the original game (F.E.A.R. Extraction Point and F.E.A.R. Perseus Mandate), which are now no longer considered canon to the F.E.A.R. universe.

Project Origin begins thirty minutes prior to the conclusion of the original F.E.A.R., with the player controlling Michael Becket, a Delta Force sergeant. Sent to take the president of Armacham Technology Corporation (ATC) into protective custody, things go awry when Point Man destroys the Origin Facility, and Becket and his teammates are caught in the blast. Waking up in a strange hospital that is seemingly under attack by an ATC black ops squad, things become even more complicated when Alma Wade, now free from her confinements, begins to show a keen interest in Becket.

In making Project Origin, Monolith looked at the reception of the first game, specifically what was popular and what was not. With this in mind, they set out to correct the two most frequently criticised elements of the original; monotone and repetitive environments, and lack of enemy variety. At the same time, they attempted to enhance the game's most lauded elements; the combat mechanics and enemy AI. By making Alma a more central presence than in the first game, they also hoped to enhance the horror elements of the original.

Project Origin was generally well received by critics, although it was felt to be inferior to the first game. Common points of praise included the combat mechanics, sound effects, mech sections, graphics, and enemy variety, with some critics also lauding the level design and voice acting. Less enthusiastically received were the plot, cover mechanics, horror elements, some of the gameplay changes from the original (specifically the removal of the lean function), and multiplayer. Several critics also felt the game took too few risks and was little more than a generic, albeit well-made, shooter.

== Gameplay ==
F.E.A.R. 2: Project Origin is a first-person shooter with gameplay broadly similar to the original F.E.A.R. The player's arsenal includes a handgun, assault rifle, submachine gun, shotgun, automatic shotgun, sniper rifle, nail gun, rocket launcher, laser carbine, flamethrower, and pulse rifle. Each weapon differs in terms of accuracy, range, rate of fire, armor penetration, damage, and weight. Only four different firearms can be carried at any one time. The player also has access to four different types of projectile - frag grenades, incendiary grenades, shock grenades (electricity-based), and proximity mines. The player can carry five of each type, and can carry all four at once (allowing for up to 20 projectiles), but only one type may be equipped at any one time. Players can also "cook" grenades before throwing them; setting them off but holding onto them for a moment before tossing them. An on-screen meter tells the player how much time is left before they detonate.

A prominent gameplay element in Project Origin is "reflex time"; an ability which slows down the game world while still allowing the player to aim and react at normal speeds. This effect is used to simulate the player character's superhuman reflexes, and is represented by stylized visual effects, such as bullets in flight that cause air distortion or interact with the game's particle system. The duration which reflex time lasts is limited, determined by a meter which slowly fills up automatically when the ability is not being used. The player can permanently increase the size of the meter by picking up "reflex injections". Other pickups available during the game include medkits, medical injections, and protective armor (reduces the amount of damage the player takes during combat). Medical injections are automatically used as soon as they are picked up, but med kits can be stored (up to three), and used manually by the player.

A new feature in the game is the ability to interact with the environment, such as upending a table or toppling a shelf to provide cover. Occasionally, the player will also be able to move objects blocking their path. Unlike the first game, Project Origin uses a limited regenerative health system. When the player's health drops below 30%, if the player can avoid taking damage for a certain amount of time, the health meter will start to refill automatically, but only up to 30%. Iron sight aiming is also new to the game (in the first game, the camera just zoomed in slightly rather than transitioning into a true iron sight perspective). The player also has access to a PDA, which contains information on current objectives, gameplay tutorials, information on the player's weaponry, and any intel the player has collected, automatically categorised into subjects.

The HUD when in the EPA; one of the new gameplay styles added to the game.

Also new to Project Origin is the ability to use mechs, called Elite Power Armor (EPA) in-game. An EPA will become available during certain sections of the game, although the player is not obliged to use it, and can, if they wish, traverse the level on foot. EPAs are armed with two miniguns and two shoulder mounted rocket launchers. Ammo for each is infinite, but the miniguns overheat if fired continuously, and require a short cool-down period. Similarly, the rocket launchers require a moment to arm. EPAs also have fully regenerative health and an optional night vision display that allows the player to easily discern heat signatures.

=== Multiplayer ===
The game's multiplayer can support up to 16 players, and initially featured deathmatch, team deathmatch, "Control" (three control points must be captured and defended), "Armored Front" (similar to Control, but control points must be captured in a specific order, and each team also has access to an EPA), "Failsafe" (one team is tasked with planting and detonating a bomb, the other team with preventing them), and "Blitz" (a capture the flag game in which the flags are canisters of PHLAG ("PhosphoLuminescent Agent"), a substance that leaks out behind the player as they carry the canister, allowing for them to be easily tracked).

Multiplayer mode features an experience levelling system and all game modes feature a customisable load out, with the player free to choose their weaponry, grenades, and armor. In the original release of the game, there were nine maps; six were general purpose and supported all game types except Armored Front, the other three supported only Armored Front. In September 2009, a patch added SloMo Deathmatch as an additional game mode. This game type features a reflex power-up, which only one player can carry at a time, and when it is fully charged (it charges when it is being carried) that player can activate it and give themselves a considerable speed advantage over opposing players. However, whoever is carrying the power-up will have a bluish glow and will be permanently visible on all players' mini-maps.

== Plot ==
The game begins thirty minutes before the end of the first game. A Delta Force unit has been deployed to take Genevieve Aristide, president of Armacham Technology Corporation (ATC) into protective custody, in light of fears that the ATC board may be planning to assassinate her so as to silence her. The hand-picked team consists of 1st Sgt. Griffin; SFC Keegan, Sgt. Jankowski (brother of the character from the first game), Sgt. Morales, Sgt. Becket (the player character), Cpl. Fox, and communications liaison 1st Lt. Stokes.

Arriving at Aristide's penthouse in an APC, the team are immediately attacked by an ATC black ops squad, commanded by Colonel Richard Vanek. From the commencement of the mission, Becket begins to experience hallucinations involving Alma Wade. In Aristide's apartment, Becket uncovers hints of an ATC project called "Harbinger", which seems to involve himself and his teammates. Files list each team member's "Paragon Review Scores" and "telesthetic potential", with Becket's scores higher than anyone "aside from the Origin Prototypes." Moments after Becket finds Aristide, Point Man causes a self destruction of the Origin facility, with the shockwave knocking Becket unconscious.

He finds himself in a hospital operating room undergoing surgery as Aristide watches. During this, he has macabre visions of the doctors mutilating and tearing him apart as he struggles on the operating table. He later wakes up and finds the hospital under attack by the black ops team, learning that himself, Stokes, and Griffin have all undergone "Activation" surgery, and were being prepared for "Attunement". He is then contacted by a man calling himself "Snake Fist", who says he wants to help them escape and destroy Alma. He meets with Aristide, who tells him he needs to get into the Telesthetic Attunement Chamber (TAC) if he wants to have any hope of defeating Alma. Mid-procedure, the lab is attacked and Becket witnesses several of the black ops team killed by otherworldly black tentacles. He then passes out and has a vision of Alma on a tree swing near a nuclear power plant.

Upon regaining consciousness, he finds Jankowski dying on an operating table, his last words to Beckett are how they have to help “her”. He later encounters Fox, who also references the woman, before Fox is killed by the black tentacles. Eventually, Becket learns the purpose of Harbinger – to turn ordinary people into psychic commanders. Becket fights his way out of the hospital, which is revealed to be a massive underground installation beneath the ruined Auburn district of Fairport, and Snake Fist directs him to Wade Elementary, informing him that the woman referenced by Jankowski and Fox was Alma, who has become "aware" of Beckett and is drawn to him due to his immense telepathic potential. He reunites with Griffin and Stokes, but moments later, Griffin is attacked and killed by the black tentacles. The remainder of the team heads to the school in the APC, and once there, Becket uncovers evidence of "Project Paragon", which is designed to spot children with promising psychic abilities. Becket himself was a student at the school and, although he has no memory of it, must have been subjected to the project. He and Stokes enter the school to search for Snake Fist but eventually get split up. Becket is then terrorized by Alma, who changes her appearance to resemble an attractive woman in order to seduce him.

Upon reaching the school’s nurse office, Becket discovers a secret Paragon facility beneath the school. When entering the facility, he watches on the security cameras as Aristide threatens Snake Fist for correctional offsets as he tries to convince her to help him with his plan to destroy Alma. While navigating towards him, Becket is attacked by the remainder of the black ops team led by Colonel Vanek attempting to reach Snake Fist before Becket. After a brief struggle, Becket kills Vanek and continues to search, while fending off against human specimens. He eventually finds Snake Fist; whose real name is Terry Halford, an ATC researcher. Halford is able to successfully transfer the files to the APC, but gets an alert that Replica forces are storming the facility because they are converging on Becket’s telesthetic signature. As they prepare to leave, Halford hands Becket a prototype weapon, but is immediately beheaded by a Replica Assassin using stealth capabilities. With Halford dead and Replica forces hunting Becket down, he manages to escape and regroup above ground with the team in the APC to view the files. In them, Halford explains that Aristide tricked Becket into the TAC so as to draw Alma's attention to him. He also says that Becket isn't yet strong enough to defeat Alma, and needs to amplify his psychic abilities by going to an ATC facility inside a nuclear power plant on nearby Still Island, which houses an amplification device. Still Island was also Alma's home before she was moved to the Origin facility.

En route, the APC is ambushed by Replica forces, and the APC falls down into a subway tunnel. As the team defends against the Replica soldiers, Keegan wanders off in a daze, searching for "her". Becket goes to search for Keegan through the subway as Stokes and Morales fix the APC, but Becket is unable to retrieve Keegan. Despite his disappearance, Becket exits the subway station and is informed by Stokes about a cargo tunnel with a train that will bring him to Still Island. As he navigates through the street, Becket has visions of Keegan, but he manages to find the cargo tunnel. Once off the train, Becket, Stokes, and Morales reunite and continue to the island. There, Becket finds the tree from his hallucinations, Alma's swing still hanging from its branches. He and Stokes head to the amplifier and Becket enters. Aristide arrives and explains that she plans to seal Becket and Alma inside the device, and then use Alma as leverage against ATC. This is why she tricked Becket into the TAC; she needed Alma to be aware of Becket so she could be lured to the machine. When Stokes tries to intervene, Aristide fatally shoots her.

Aristide seals the machine with Becket inside as Alma approaches him, and he soon appears in a hallucinatory landscape. While trying to escape the machine, Becket is forced to fight off apparitions of a maddened Keegan. As he does, he sees flashes of Alma, who appears to be raping him in the real world. Eventually, he escapes the hallucination. The machine doors open, and Becket sees Alma standing amid a post-apocalyptic landscape, the black tentacles spreading out around her. She is pregnant. She approaches Becket, placing his hand onto her stomach as a child's voice says "Mommy".

=== Reborn ===
Reborn begins with Paxton Fettel speaking about his prediction of a coming war from the original game; "The war has begun just as I dreamed it would, just as I foresaw. Dreams are all I have now, dreams of death, of blood and fire. Of her. The time has come to awaken; to be...reborn."

The game is set concurrently with Project Origin. As Becket and his squad mates are tracking down Snake Fist at Wade Elementary, in a different part of Fairport, ATC Security has launched an attack against Replica Command Post Sigma, and additional Replicas have been called in. The game begins with the Replica designated Foxtrot 813 dropping to a location near the command post inside of an EPA. He fights his way through ATC forces but no sooner has his mission begun than he starts to have problems with his radio feed and video display. He eventually makes it to Sigma and tries to correct the problems with his equipment. As he ascertains that the interference is originating at the blast site of the Origin facility, he is pulled into a hallucinatory realm by Paxton Fettel, where he is attacked by corrupt Replicas. Upon killing them, Fettel tells him, "Do you see? You are different from the others. They are meaningless now. They are ghosts. You must set me free." When 813 returns to reality, he finds that he has killed his Replica teammates. Replica command then issues an order for all Replicas to shoot 813 on sight.

Guided by Fettel, 813 starts to move through the devastated city towards the blast site, fighting off Replicas throughout his journey. In an underground car park, he is attacked by Alma but manages to escape and continue on, with Fettel continuously in his head (saying such things as "you must feel it all around you. The promise of things to come" and "they do not understand; they are blind to whom they serve").

Eventually, 813 reaches the blast site and proceeds deep under the rubble. As he moves, Fettel promises him that they will lead "a mighty army". As he nears Fettel's location, Alma again tries to stop him, but he again evades her. Eventually, 813 opens a door to find Fettel kneeling in the middle of a room. Fettel welcomes him, calling him "my brother". As he touches 813, Fettel melts away. 813 then removes his helmet to reveal Fettel's face, as he gloats "I am...reborn."

== Development ==
=== Rights issues and canonicity ===
The game was announced by Monolith Productions in February 2006. Monolith had been purchased by Warner Bros. Games in 2004, after development of the original F.E.A.R was already underway and a publishing deal had already been struck with Vivendi. By 2006, although Monolith and Warner owned the rights to the F.E.A.R. intellectual property and characters, Vivendi (who had published the first game under their Sierra Entertainment label) still owned the name "F.E.A.R." As a result, any non-Vivendi game set in the F.E.A.R. universe could use the characters and events from the original game, but could not be called F.E.A.R. At the same time, any non-Warner game set in the F.E.A.R. universe could not use the characters and events from the original game, but could be called F.E.A.R. In May 2006, Vivendi announced that an expansion pack for the first game (F.E.A.R. Extraction Point) was being developed by TimeGate Studios. The press release clarified that the plot for the expansion had been approved by Monolith and was in line with their own plans for a full sequel.

Speaking of the rights issues in August 2007, Troy Skinner (producer of the unnamed sequel) played down the significance of Monolith not being able to use the F.E.A.R. name;

the only things it changes are the name of the game, and the name of the unit the player character is assigned to. We have the rights to every other aspect of the game universe. Alma is ours. The previous story-line is ours. Armacham is ours. The weapons are ours. Obviously, the development team is ours. The game engine is ours. The AI expertise is ours.

In December 2008, a few months before the release of what was now known as Project Origin, Monolith officially confirmed what had long been suspected; despite the initial reports that they had approved the story for both Extraction Point and a second expansion, F.E.A.R. Perseus Mandate, and that that story was in line with their own plans for the sequel, in fact, that sequel would ignore the events of both expansions and instead serve as a canonical follow-up to the original game. Lead artist Dave Matthews explained that the expansions

were made outside of Monolith and they took the story in a very different direction than we had intended, so when we started working on F.E.A.R. 2, there was a very difficult decision. Did we try to figure out and change the story with what we were trying to tell with Alma, and incorporate the story arc with what goes on between Extraction Point and Perseus Mandate? That's when we decided to treat it as if it were a 'what if?' or an alternate spin because we thought it would be of merit to the story if it remained pure.

Speaking to CVG, he reiterated, "[TimeGate] took the story in a direction that we didn't intend. We look at Extraction Point and Perseus Mandate as an alternate universe, a 'what could have been', and because of that it doesn't necessarily diminish the story that we were trying to tell. F.E.A.R. was about Alma, F.E.A.R. 2 is about Alma, and we wanted to continue the story the way we originally intended."

=== Naming the game ===
With the game unnamed as a result of the rights issues, in June 2007, Monolith announced a contest called "Name Your Fear" to find a new name. Open only to residents of the United States, contestants had three weeks to submit a name, after which three finalists would be chosen by Monolith, and those three finalists would be opened to a public vote. Monolith specifically asked for a name that would evoke associations with "Frenetic Action, Horror (Asian), Destruction, Apocalypse, Paramilitary, Gore." They discouraged fans from submitting acronyms, obscenities, or titles that mean something in a different language. They also released a brief plot blurb and two pieces of concept art to help inspire fans. The three finalists would be flown to Monolith's headquarters in Kirkland, Washington, and given a behind-the-scenes tour where they'd meet the game's designers and have their likenesses captured for use in the game itself.

In August, the three names were revealed as Dead Echo, Project Origin, and Dark Signal. Monolith also revealed some of the more humorous examples of names they had rejected, including, S.C.A.R.E.D., A.F.R.A.I.D., C.H.U.C.K.N.O.R.R.I.S., M.e.a.t., S.A.U.S.A.G.E., Little Miss Bloodshine, Bloodbath Tycoon, Snake FIST, Killdozer, Rage, Inhumane, Aftermath, Shroud, Atrox, and Shattered. In September, the winning name was announced as Project Origin.

In September 2008, Monolith Productions and Warner Bros. Games re-acquired the F.E.A.R. name from Vivendi and decided to keep "Project Origin" as a subtitle.

=== Platforms ===
Originally, the plan for Project Origin was to release two completely different games - one for PC, and one for Xbox 360 and PlayStation 3, with Monolith president Samantha Ryan stating, "in addition to continuing the series on PC, we're committed to bringing it to next-generation consoles by creating separate titles tailored to each audience instead of a one-size-fits-all approach." This plan was never realised and in December 2008, writer and co-lead designer Craig Hubbard explained that the two titles "just merged."

In relation to the console versions of the game, Monolith had been unhappy with the console ports of the original game, which had been handled by Day 1 Studios, with Matthews stating, "we feel they didn't do everything that they could of achieved." As a result of their disappointment with these ports, Monolith determined to develop all three versions of the sequel simultaneously, with no lead platform from which the others would derive. Matthews explains,

our current pipeline of development affords the opportunity to create and test assets and gameplay on all three platforms simultaneously. I can very quickly see if a certain experience is synonymous across all three platforms before I put it into the game. We haven't taken a port mentality with F.E.A.R. 2, with a lead SKU that gets copied over to other platforms.

=== Design ===
In a July 2008 blog post on the game's community page, Matthews explained that the team had divided the first game's elements into three categories based on fan reaction; the good (combat mechanics, atmosphere, AI, graphics), the bad (too many interiors), and the ugly (a monochrome palette, lack of enemy variety, repetitive environments). With this in mind, one of Monolith's main goals with Project Origin was to successfully tackle the biggest criticisms of the original game - the bland and repetitive environments, and the lack of enemy variety. Co-lead designer John Mulkey explained that "variety" in a general sense was one of their main guiding principals as they strove for "more visual variety, more variety in enemies and in gameplay experiences."

Mulkey, who was lead level designer on the first game, acknowledged that although that game was claustrophobic by design, the interiors were too similar, and so, "we've decided to mix it up and to have these more open spaces." Similarly, Leo De Bruyn, lead level designer on the sequel, argued that in the first game, "we wanted to make the game have a very creepy and oppressive vibe. The color palettes reflected this, and I think we created this feeling very successfully. In retrospect, perhaps a little too successfully."

For the sequel, Monolith wanted to have the game take place across multiple, visually differentiated, locations. Matthews stated that although the game does feature a lot of interiors, "we have taken great care to diversify the areas that you will progress through." In terms of enemy variety, the team endeavored to create not just aesthetically differentiated enemies, but "new AI types that have different tactics." Indeed, the creation of new locations and new enemies unexpectedly dovetailed into one another. As Mulkey explains, "as we started to change the volume of the space the combat altered, and it gave us new opportunities to approach the AI in different ways, educate them with different activities and abilities."

At the same time as introducing such variety, however, Monolith was conscious of not straying too far from the basics of the first game. Matthews explains, "to bring too many new unique experiences to F.E.A.R. 2 could potentially diminish the F.E.A.R.-like quality we have tried so hard to preserve." An example of this was the game's health system. Initially, the plan was for the game to have a fully regenerative health system with no medkits. Early demos incorporated this system, but fan reaction was largely negative, with many arguing that the first game's medkit-based health system was superior. In response, the designers adopted a partial regenerative system that would restore a player's health to 30%, but they also incorporated the medkits from the first game (albeit limiting the player to three and making them much scarcer than before). After the change, they found that testers "reported that the fights felt more dynamic and less repetitive than before."

In terms of gameplay, Monolith initially experimented with a co-op mode in the main campaign but they decided against it because they felt it "watered down" the horror. Graphically, John O'Rorke (engine architect and principal software engineer), explained that an important element of the sequel was enhancing the first game's much-lauded particle system and dynamic lighting. In particular, Monolith worked to increase the amount of destructible elements within each location. The game also features numerous graphical elements not in the original, including HDR, motion blur, new lighting solutions, volumetric rendering, and ambient occlusion.

=== Atmosphere ===
Much like the first game's atmosphere was heavily inspired by certain films, so too with the sequel. Matthews lists films such as Timur Bekmambetov's Nightwatch (2004) and Daywatch (2006), Alexandre Aja's Haute tension (2003), and the Saw franchise as especially important inspirations for the game's atmosphere. In relation to Saw, he explained the designers were trying to capture, "that response that happens in your body when you realise you're going to have to do something horrible, or something much worse is going to happen".

One of the scenes in the game in which Alma has a much more central role than she did in the original.

One of the central elements of the game's atmosphere would be Alma, who had a much more involved role in the sequel than in the original. By way of this increased presence, Monolith intended to enhance the game's horror; "we've put a lot of effort and a lot of thought into the ways in which we can give Alma teeth." Hubbard also pointed out that Alma has "a stronger agenda, which gives her a more active, visceral role." Similarly, Matthews stated, "now she's out, after 16, 17 years in that vault, with her psyche still dreaming and hating, she's now completely toxic."

Speaking of the balance between combat and horror, Hubbard reminded people that "this is first and foremost an action game. There are horror elements, but it's not meant to be an unrelenting experience in terror." With this in mind, Monolith were attempting to strike a similar balance as in the first game;

we have always perceived close-quarters combat as the centerpiece of the game, and the horror as a secondary element that helps to set up future combat scenarios. [...] The relationship between the two is that the horror elements are a palette cleanser that resets the player's emotional state, and allows the kinetic aspects of the next combat to land with more force.

=== Promotion ===
==== Digital comic ====
Created by DC Comics, and released on GameTrailers on October 31, 2008, the Project Origin "digital comic" is an animated 73-second clip depicting the aftermath of the helicopter crash from the end of the first game. As Jin-Sun Kwon regains consciousness, she realises that both Point Man and Douglas Holiday are missing. Noting a trail of bloody footprints leading away from the crash, she is startled by Bremmer, the pilot, asking what happened. However, Bremmer begins to bleed from his ears, and seconds later, his flesh melts off his body. Outside the helicopter, Jin sees Alma smiling, her eyes glowing red.

==== Armacham Field Guide ====
Included with a limited steel box edition of Project Origin available only by preordering the game from GameStop, Armacham Field Guide is a primer detailing much of the background mythology behind the F.E.A.R. games. The book recounts the events of the first game, as well as expanding on Alma's and ATC's history and the creation of Projects Origin and Perseus. It also includes information on the various characters and weaponry from each game. The book is littered with handwritten notations by Genevieve Aristide, composed shortly before the second game begins, in which she speculates and muses about what ATC is doing, her role in it, and what the future may hold.

=== Australian release ===
In November 2008, Project Origin was refused classification by the Australian Classification Board (ACB) due to its "high-impact violence". This made it illegal to sell the game, or even bring it into the country. In its official statement, the ACB said,

the violence is considered highly impactful in such scenes as where Michael uses his sub-machine gun to explicitly bisect an enemy, the two parts of the body lying separately on the ground, with copious blood spray. There are also a number of explicit close-range decapitations involving both human and mutant creatures. The decapitations are the result of close-up throat slashing from behind and close-up gunshots to the throat. All violence results in large blood spray: there are blood-stained interiors and blood sprays onto objects, including the camera lens. With weapons such as sniper rifles, bodies can be torn apart at close range, limbs are seen flying off and the wounded flesh is reduced to a bloody pulp. The use of nail guns pins victims to a wall before they fall to the ground in a bloody mass. The scenes often have blood-soaked walls and floors and the victims' bodies do not always disappear.

Warner appealed the decision and three weeks later, the ACB's review panel revoked the ban and gave the game an MA15+ certificate without mandating any alterations or edits.

== Reception ==
Reception

Aggregate score
| Aggregator | Score | | |
| Aggregator | PC | PS3 | Xbox 360 |
|---|---|---|---|
| Metacritic | 79/100 | 79/100 | 77/100 |

Review scores
| Publication | Score | | |
| Publication | PC | PS3 | Xbox 360 |
|---|---|---|---|
| Computer and Video Games | | 7.5/10 | |
| Eurogamer | | | 5/10 |
| GameSpot | 7/10 | 7/10 | 7/10 |
| IGN | 8.3/10 | 8.3/10 | 8.3/10 |
| PlayStation Official Magazine – Australia | | 7/10 | |
| PlayStation Official Magazine – UK | | 8/10 | |
| Official Xbox Magazine (UK) | | | 7/10 |
| Official Xbox Magazine (US) | | | 7.5/10 |
| PC Zone | 80/100 | | |

Project Origin received "generally favorable reviews," with the PC and PlayStation 3 versions holding aggregate scores of 79 out of 100 on Metacritic, based on 49 and forty-eight reviews, respectively. The Xbox 360 version holds a score of 77 out of 100, based on 68 reviews.

IGN's Jason Ocampo scored all three versions 8.3 out of 10, praising the score, sound effects, voice acting, and plot, but criticising the ability to create cover ("feels like a gimmick, since there's no effective way of hugging that cover") and multiplayer. Although he enjoyed the game overall ("it's a good shooter, bordering on great"), he argued, "it's not as groundbreaking as its predecessor." GameSpot's Kevin VanOrd scored all three versions 7 out of 10. He was critical of the story, atmosphere, multiplayer, and the graphics, noting "F.E.A.R. 2 simply doesn't match its FPS peers from a technical perspective," and citing "simple textures", "inconsistent shadows", clipping, and poor lighting. However, he praised the sound effects, level design, combat mechanics, and implementation of slow motion. He concluded, that "while fun and well-crafted, [it] seems to have lost sight of the strengths that made its predecessor so unique."

PC Zone's Steve Hogarth scored the PC version 80 out of 100. He was critical of the ability to create cover and the atmosphere, but he praised the new enemies, level design, combat mechanics, and implementation of slow motion. He concluded, "the magic of the original F.E.A.R. is buried in here somewhere [...] but Project Origin falls short of delivering the kick provided by the original." CVG's Mike Jackson scored the PC version 7.5 out of 100. He was highly critical of both the horror elements and the storyline, but he praised the "satisfying" combat mechanics, graphics, sound effects, animations, physics, implementation of slow motion, level design, and enemy variety. He concluded that although the game "dresses itself up like an edgy, scary, sinister horror of epic proportions, under the surface it's a solid FPS."

Jon Blyth of PlayStation Official Magazine (UK) scored the PlayStation 3 version 8 out of 10. Calling it "a pleasure to play," he praised the plot, script, voice acting, combat mechanics, and mech sections. However, he also found the game to be very traditional, writing, "innovation is not F.E.A.R. 2's strong suit", and finding the overall gameplay "jarringly old-skool." Anthony O'Connor of Australia's PlayStation Official Magazine scored the PlayStation 3 version 7 out of 10. He was critical of the plot, and level design, and found the game too easy, concluding "it's not a bad game, but it could have been so much more."

Paul Curthoys of the Official Xbox Magazine (NA) scored the Xbox 360 version 7.5 out of 10. He was critical of the atmosphere, horror, and storyline, arguing, "this series has lost a bit of its magic." Although he praised the combat mechanics, level design, and mech sections, he concluded, "[it's] nowhere near as awesome as we hoped it'd be." Ben Talbot of Official Xbox Magazine (UK) scored the Xbox 360 version 7 out of 10. He was critical of the horror, arguing "[it has] every cliché imaginable." He praised the combat mechanics and mech sections, but concluded, "where was the ambition to innovate or surprise? It's by no means terrible, but for such a major franchise, more was expected." Eurogamer's Kieron Gillen scored the Xbox 360 version 5 out of 10, criticising the "woeful lack of inspiration". He praised the combat mechanics but found the game to be "a checklist of genre-tropes" and "as archetypal a corridor-shooter as has ever been made."

In a blog post a few days after the game's release, Steve Gaynor (lead level designer on Perseus Mandate) was highly critical of Project Origin, particularly how the level design undermines the AI and prevents it from seeming as intuitive as in the first game and its two expansions; "frequent are restrictive, linear encounter spaces without flanking corridors." He argued, "this not only makes the player's role in combat more frustrating, but makes the enemies appear less intelligent - with fewer navigational options, they tend to remain stationary more and surprise the player less."

In a 2021 retrospective on the game, The Escapist's Elijah Beahm, called it "Monolith's worst game." He was critical of the gameplay changes, particularly the removal of the lean function, and argued that such changes "serve to highlight why [the original] F.E.A.R. worked so damn well." He found the horror elements to be on the level of "a cheap haunted house gag." Echoing Gaynor's criticism of the level design, he pointed out, "levels are narrower, funneling you into predictable shootouts with half the variability of the first game." He concluded, "it's as if someone created a checklist of everything great about F.E.A.R. and actively tried to subvert or contradict every part."

=== Sales ===
In the week prior to its release, Project Origin was the most queued cross-platform title on GameFly. Upon its release, it debuted at #2 on the US PC charts. The following week, it dropped to #8. It went on to be the fifth best-selling PC title of February 2009. The Xbox 360 version finished at #11 in that month's all-platform charts.

It also debuted at #2 on the UK all-platform charts. In the first week of release, the Xbox 360 version entered the top ten rental chart at #9. The following week it climbed to #6.

== Downloadable content ==
In April 2009, Monolith released "Toy Soldiers", a free multiplayer three-map-pack. The main selling point of the map pack was that the characters are transformed into tiny toy soldiers who then battle in a normal-sized arena. The three maps were "Fulltilt!" (set inside a pinball machine), "Cockroach" (set in a hospital bathroom covered in blood), and "Recess" (set in a children's sandpit).

A second multiplayer map pack was released in May, named "Armored Front". Containing two new maps ("Decoy" and "Conductor", both for Armored Front mode), the pack also included four new character heads for player customisation, and console-specific themes for the Xbox 360 and PlayStation 3.

A third DLC pack was released in September featuring a four-mission single-player campaign; F.E.A.R. 2: Reborn. Associate producer Lucas Myers explains that Monolith approached Reborn much like they did Project Origin - by looking at fans' criticisms; "we listened very closely to our fans' praises and frustrations from F.E.A.R. 2. We've varied our environments even more, opened them up and added vertical combat elements."

In November 2021, the F.E.A.R. franchise, including F.E.A.R. 2: Reborn, was added to Microsoft's backward compatibility program, making the games playable on the Xbox One and Xbox Series X/S.
