= F.E.A.R. Extraction Point =

Standalone expansion pack for F.E.A.R.

- Developer: TimeGate Studios
- Publisher: Vivendi Games (Note: Released under the Sierra Entertainment brand name)
- Producer: Tim Hall
- Designer: Brett Norton
- Programmer: Denis Papp
- Artist: Zachary Forcher
- Writer: Richard Pearsey
- Composers: Gabriel Mann; Rebecca Kneubuhl
- Series: F.E.A.R.
- Platforms: Windows; Xbox 360
- Release: Windows: NA: October 24, 2006; EU: October 26, 2006; Xbox 360: NA: November 6, 2007; EU: November 16, 2007
- Genres: First-person shooter, psychological horror
- Mode: Single-player

F.E.A.R. Extraction Point is the first expansion pack for the first-person shooter psychological horror video game F.E.A.R. First Encounter Assault Recon. Developed by TimeGate Studios and originally published by Vivendi Games under the Sierra Entertainment label, it was released for Windows in October 2006 and for Xbox 360 in November 2007. The Xbox version was only available packaged with another expansion, F.E.A.R. Perseus Mandate, and released as F.E.A.R. Files. On the PC, as well as a standalone release, Extraction Point was also bundled with the original game for F.E.A.R. Gold Edition, released in March 2007, and with the original game and Perseus Mandate for F.E.A.R. Platinum Collection, released in November 2007. The Platinum Collection was also released on Steam in 2012 and GOG.com in 2015. In 2021, F.E.A.R. Files was added to Microsoft's backward compatibility program, making the games playable on the Xbox One and Xbox Series X/S. Neither expansion is now considered canon, as the Monolith Productions-developed F.E.A.R. 2: Project Origin ignores the events of both.

The game's story begins immediately after the original F.E.A.R. ends; the helicopter carrying Point Man, Douglas Holiday, and Jin Sun-Kwon loses power and crashes. With the city deserted in the wake of the Origin facility's explosion, the trio set out to attempt to reach an extraction point. Split off from Holiday and Jin, Point Man is shocked to find Paxton Fettel is still alive, and the Replicas have been reanimated. En route to the extraction, Point Man once again begins seeing Alma Wade. However, her behavior seems different than before, and it is slowly revealed that she has a new agenda.

Extraction Point was well received on PC, with critics praising its fidelity to the base game, and lauding the combat mechanics, sound design, graphics, atmosphere, implementation of "reflex time", and AI. Common criticisms included a lack of replay value, a short campaign given the $30 price, and a lack of innovation and originality. The expansion went on to win PC Gamer's "Best Expansion Pack" (2006). On the Xbox 360, F.E.A.R. Files received mixed reviews, with most critics preferring Extraction Point to Perseus Mandate, but finding the overall package dated and too similar to the base game.

== Gameplay ==
Point Man fires the minigun, one of the new weapons introduced in the game.

F.E.A.R. Extraction Point is a first-person shooter with gameplay very similar to the original F.E.A.R. As in the original, the player's arsenal includes handguns (which the player can dual wield), an assault rifle, submachine gun, shotgun, sniper rifle, nail gun, repeating cannon, rocket launcher, and particle beam. New weapons in Extraction Point are a minigun and laser carbine. Each weapon differs in terms of accuracy, range, rate of fire, damage, and weight. Only three different firearms can be carried at any one time. The player also has access to four different types of projectile - frag grenades, proximity grenades, remote bombs, and deployable turrets. The player can carry five of each type and can carry all four at once (allowing for up to 20 projectiles), but only one type may be equipped at any one time. Additionally, when using the remote bombs, the player must holster their weapon.

As in the original game, Extraction Point's melee combat is a viable combat alternative. The butts of all firearms can be used in close combat; lighter weapons, although less powerful, allow the player to move around more quickly and increase the chances of a successful melee attack. Movement speed is maximized if a player holsters their weapon, which allows them to engage in hand-to-hand combat. As well as the basic melee attack, players can also perform a jumping kick and a sliding tackle, both of which, if landed correctly, instantly kill regular enemies.

A prominent gameplay element in Extraction Point is "reflex time"; an ability which slows down the game world while still allowing the player to aim and react at normal speeds. This effect is used to simulate the player character's superhuman reflexes, and is represented by stylized visual effects, such as bullets in flight that cause air distortion or interact with the game's particle system. The duration which reflex time lasts is limited, determined by a meter which slowly fills up automatically when the ability is not being used. The player can permanently increase the size of the reflex meter by picking up reflex boosters. Other pickups available during the game include medkits (of which the player can store ten), protective armor (reduces the amount of damage the player takes during combat), and health boosters (permanently increase the player's health meter).

Reflex time is an important element of the game's combat mechanics insofar as Extraction Point's artificial intelligence allows hostile NPCs an unusually large range of action; enemies can duck to travel under crawlspaces, jump through windows, vault over railings, climb ladders, and push over large objects to create cover, all in reaction to what the player is doing at any given moment. Various opponents may also act as a team, taking back routes to flank the player, using suppressive fire, taking cover and often falling back if under fire, alerting one another as to the player's location, and giving one another orders (which may, or may not, be followed).

New features in Extraction Point include the ability to bash open doors by using the melee function, as well as blast them open with explosives, and the ability to smash crates, some of which contain supplies.

== Plot ==
The game opens with Alma Wade's physical form approaching Paxton Fettel's corpse, as Fettel's threat of war from the original F.E.A.R. is heard; "A war is coming. I've seen it in my dreams. Fires sweeping over the earth. Bodies in the streets. Cities turned to dust. Retaliation." The game then cuts to moments after the end of the original game; the helicopter evacuating F.E.A.R.'s Point Man and Jin Sun-Kwon and Delta Force's Douglas Holiday has crashed into a derelict building. All three have survived, but they find Fairport mysteriously empty. Jin speculates that it must have been evacuated due to the destruction of the Origin facility, but Holiday points out that a city can not be completely evacuated that quickly. Jin then suggests that it may be something to do with Alma.

Cut off from Holiday and Jin, Point Man arranges to meet them nearby. Entering a church, he is confronted by Paxton Fettel, who notes that the circumstances do not make sense; Point Man already killed him, about which he is not happy. Fettel reactivates the dormant Replicas, forcing Point Man to fight his way through them. En route to the rendezvous point with the others, he once again begins to have hallucinations of Fettel and Alma, in one of which she says, "please don't let them hurt me."

Meanwhile, Holiday and Jin are also separated. Holiday learns that an extraction point has been established on the roof of Auburn Memorial Hospital, and so arranges for the three to meet there. After Holiday and Point Man rendezvous, they head through the warehouse district. However, they are stalked by semi-transparent supernatural creatures, and Holiday is brutally killed. Point Man heads into the subway alone, continuing to engage Replicas.

As he moves through the tunnels, it becomes apparent that Alma (in her red dress form) is aiding him by pointing him in the right direction and eliminating Replicas. Meanwhile, Jin reaches the hospital only to find everyone there is dead. Point Man's hallucinations continue, including a recurring vision where he sees the transparent creatures entering and exiting a ball of blue light. Passing through an office building on the way to the hospital, Fettel taunts him for still not understanding his purpose in what is going on. Continuing through the building, Alma urges him to hurry, and Fettel tells him, "Soon, you will have a choice to make. You are near the time when you will have to stop running." Shortly thereafter, he has a hallucination of Jin being chased by the transparent creatures, and moments later he finds her mutilated body. Proceeding alone to the hospital, he finds it full of dead Replicas and Delta Force soldiers.

Alma's two forms merge near the conclusion of the game.

As he moves through the building, he sees the transparent creatures attacking and killing Replicas. When a power outage knocks out the service elevator that he needs to get to the roof, Point Man descends into the basement to restore power. There, he experiences a hallucination which concludes with both of Alma's forms (red dress and physical) walking towards the bright blue light and it flaring when they reach it. When the hallucination ends, Point Man discovers the power is back and heads to the roof. Once there, Fettel appears, telling him, "You should know better by now." Point Man fights off a group of Replicas, before heading to the evac helicopter. However, as he approaches it, it explodes, knocking him out. When he awakens, Fettel tells him, "they tried to bury their sins, but instead planted the seeds of their doom. She would not be forgotten. We will make them remember." Fettel then disappears, as Point Man sees that much of Fairport is in flames. As the credits roll, we once again hear Fettel's promise of an imminent war; "a war is coming, I've seen it in my dreams. Fires sweeping over the earth, bodies in the streets, cities turned to dust. Retaliation."

=== Canonicity ===
Extraction Point is not considered canon in the F.E.A.R. universe insofar as F.E.A.R. 2: Project Origin disregards the events of both Extraction Point and Perseus Mandate, acting instead as a direct sequel to the original game. Initial reports stated that Monolith Productions, creators of the original game, had given the expansions' storylines their blessing, and that they were in line with their own in-development sequel. However, in December 2008, a year after the release of Perseus Mandate and a few months before the release of Project Origin, Dave Matthews, Project Origin's lead artist, explained that the expansions

were made outside of Monolith and they took the story in a very different direction than we had intended, so when we started working on F.E.A.R. 2, there was a very difficult decision. Did we try to figure out and change the story with what we were trying to tell with Alma, and incorporate the story arc with what goes on between Extraction Point and Perseus Mandate? That's when we decided to treat it as if it were a 'what if?' or an alternate spin because we thought it would be of merit to the story if it remained pure.

== Development ==
Extraction Point was announced for Microsoft Windows in early May 2006, with TimeGate Studios working on development. Due to uncertainty regarding rights (Monolith Productions, who made the base game, had been purchased by Warner Bros. Games and owned the rights to the intellectual property and characters, but Vivendi Games, who had published the base game, still owned the name F.E.A.R.), it was stated in a press release that the plot for Extraction Point had been approved by Monolith and was in line with their own plans for a full sequel, which they had announced in February.

The game was first shown at E3 in May 2006. In August, publisher Sierra Entertainment revealed that due to the release of F.E.A.R. Combat (the base game's standalone multiplayer mode, which was available for free), there would be no multiplayer component to Extraction Point. In September, a demo was released.

During the promotion of the game, producer Tim Hall explained that in making Extraction Point, the designers were keen to address some of the common criticisms of the base game. With this in mind, there is greater enemy variety and more varied environments. Hall explained that because one of the main criticisms of the first game was that the levels were too repetitive and enclosed, the team had ensured to include more aesthetically varied environments, especially large outdoor sections. He clarified, "we wanted to not only give the player more of the fun factor of F.E.A.R. but also to address any criticisms that players had - yes we have heard the office layout one a million times - so we changed things up a little. With Extraction Point we not only have that same fun close quarters combat but we have also added in some much larger areas for some fun ranged combat as well."

The game's Xbox 360 announcement came in July 2007, accompanying the announcement of Perseus Mandate, with both expansions bundled together and released under the name F.E.A.R. Files. Originally, the plan was to release it on both PlayStation 3 and Xbox 360, but the PlayStation version was cancelled. As well as the two standalone expansions, F.E.A.R. Files also includes eight new instant action maps and five new multiplayer maps.

The complete F.E.A.R. series was released on Steam in July 2012, with the Platinum Collection only available as part of the bundle. The Platinum Collection was released on GOG.com in February 2015. In November 2021, the F.E.A.R. franchise, including F.E.A.R. Files, was added to Microsoft's backward compatibility program, making the games playable on the Xbox One and Xbox Series X/S.

== Reception ==
Reception

Aggregate score
Aggregator	Score	
Aggregator	PC	Xbox 360
Metacritic	75/100	66/100

Review scores
Publication	Score	
Publication	PC	Xbox 360
Eurogamer	7/10	7/10
Game Informer	8/10	6.5/10
GameSpot	7.8/10	7/10
IGN	7.6/10	6.7/10
Official Xbox Magazine (US)		8/10
X-Play	4/5	

The PC version of Extraction Point received "generally favorable reviews", and holds a score of 75 out of 100 on Metacritic, based on 30 reviews. On the Xbox 360, F.E.A.R. Files received mixed reviews and holds a score of 66 out of 100, based on 43 reviews.

Game Informer's Adam Biessener scored the PC version 8 out of 10, praising it for "[retaining] every single good element that was present [in the base game]". He found the horror element superior to the original and especially lauded the variety of environments. However, he was somewhat critical of how similar the game was to the original, citing the re-use of sound effects and decals. Xplay's Jason D'Aprile scored it 4 out of 5, saying it retained "the intense action that made the original game such a winner." He also praised the sound design, graphics, atmosphere, and AI, calling it "a worthy gun fix."

GameSpot's Jason Ocampo scored it 7.8 out of 10, praising the atmosphere, AI, sound design, and combat mechanics. He was especially impressed with the horror elements, calling it "an exceptionally creepy experience." Although he was critical of the story and lack of replay value, he concluded, "TimeGate deserves plenty of credit for maintaining the intensity of the original". IGN's Charles Onyett scored it 7.6 out of 10. He was critical of the new environments, and found the game too similar to the original F.E.A.R., writing, "you may at times be fooled into thinking you're playing the first F.E.A.R." However, he praised the new weaponry and enemies, as well as the graphics, AI, and sound design.

Official Xbox Magazine's Casey Lynch scored F.E.A.R. Files 8 out of 10, finding Extraction Point superior to Perseus Mandate. Of the bundle as a whole, he wrote that he was "hoping for more variety in the environments and more revelation in the plotline." Eurogamer's Kristen Reed scored it 7 out of 10, finding Perseus Mandate the better of the two games. He was especially critical of Extraction Point's level design, arguing that the linearity of the levels undermined the AI; "most enemies [are] clustered in groups of threes and fours, and you tend to face them as they're being funnelled through manageable choke points." He was also critical of the graphics and the lack of innovation, finding the games' "ambitions are mainly to offer more of the same."

IGN's Erik Brudvig scored it 6.7 out of 10, praising the gameplay, combat mechanics, implementation of slow motion, AI, and the player's arsenal. However, he felt both games suffered "from a lack of identity", with each failing "to make themselves feel distinct." He concluded that the games felt "out of date and half-hearted." Game Informer's Adam Biessener scored it 6.5 out of 10, arguing that the expansions "fail to recapture the magic of the original." He was critical of the level design, finding the larger arenas unsuited to the close combat mechanics. He concluded, "these expansions are a noticeable downgrade from the first story."

=== Awards ===
Extraction Point won PC Gamer US's 2006 "Best Expansion Pack" award.
