= Alma Wade =

F.E.A.R. video game character

- F.E.A.R. character
- Three of Alma Wade’s major visual forms in the series, as seen in issue 186 of the U.S. edition of PC Gamer magazine.
- First appearance: F.E.A.R. (2005)
- Created by: Monolith Productions
- Voiced by: Melissa Roberts; Alésia Glidewell

In-universe information
- Species: Human / psychic apparition
- Gender: Female
- Family: Harlan Wade (father); Point Man (son); Paxton Fettel (son)

Alma Wade is a fictional character in the F.E.A.R. series of horror first-person shooter video games by Monolith Productions. Introduced in F.E.A.R. (2005), she is the series' central supernatural figure and principal antagonist. The games depict her as a powerful psychic who was subjected to experiments by the Armacham Technology Corporation and whose trauma manifests through hauntings, hallucinations, and distortions of reality. Alma is commonly associated with the forlorn image of a young girl in a red dress, though the series also depicts her as a young adult woman and a monstrous maternal figure. Rather than functioning only as an enemy to be defeated, Alma appears through sounds, glimpses, psychic phenomena, and sudden disturbances, allowing her to permeate the player's experience of the game world. Alma and her imagery was also used extensively in the series' promotional and tie-in media, including a live-action prequel short film, comics, trailers, and merchandising.

Commentators have discussed the character in relation to Japanese horror conventions (in particular the yūrei ghost tradition), abject maternity, and sexual violence. The anticipation surrounding F.E.A.R. 2 was tied in part to the continuation of Alma's story, while critics later argued that increased familiarity with her reduced some of the mystery that made the original game's horror themes effective. Alma's pregnancy became especially prominent in discussion and promotion of F.E.A.R. 3, including the Collector's Edition figurine and critical commentary on the game's childbirth premise. Later writing has often treated Alma as both a frightening and sympathetic figure, less as a simple villain than as a figure created by unethical experimentation and institutional violence. Academic interpretations of Alma frame her as an example of the "monstrous feminine" in video games and as a figure through which the F.E.A.R. series stages anxieties about motherhood, sexuality, patriarchal control, and corporate abuse.

== Concept and creation ==
Alma was named after the character Alma Mobley in Peter Straub's novel Ghost Story. According to lead designer Craig Hubbard, the character originated from his interest in combining action cinema with ghost stories, and that her design drew from a broad range of influences. His creative vision for Alma emerged from a broader tradition of eerie, faceless female ghosts rather than as a direct imitation of any single film character.

Alma is depicted in several forms throughout the series. In the first game, Alma's child manifestation is usually glimpsed briefly in corridors, reflections and hallucinations rather than confronted as a conventional enemy. Later games emphasize Alma's adult body and her association with pregnancy and motherhood. The character's pregnant adult form was also used in the promotion of F.E.A.R. 3. Hubbard said that Alma's different appearances were designed to represent distinct aspects of her psyche rather than simply her age at different points in the narrative. Her child form represents her final conscious memory of herself before she was placed in the Vault, rather than an accurate depiction of how she appeared at eight years old. Its principal visual influence was the ghostly child in Kiyoshi Kurosawa's Séance, with additional inspiration from Sadako and Samara in the Ring films and the Grady twins in The Shining. The developers gave this manifestation a red dress both to distinguish her visually and for symbolic and technical reasons.

Her emaciated manifestation represents Alma's actual physical body following her release. Hubbard explained that she had spent most of her life in an induced coma inside a sensory-deprivation tank, having been removed only for the experiments that produced Paxton Fettel and the Point Man. She was in her early twenties when her life support was withdrawn and the Vault was sealed, after which her body remained entombed for more than a decade. The designers therefore depicted her as severely deteriorated while retaining recognizably feminine features. Her nudity followed from the liquid-tank environment and was also intended to make the form more disturbing.

Hubbard said he wanted Alma to be "terrifying but relatable", describing her as both "a monster" and "a victim". He characterized Alma's behaviour as driven less by a calculated agenda than by trauma and primal emotional need. Her child manifestation initially represents a frightened and tormented victim reaching out for rescue, with that fear subsequently developing into anger because of her extraordinary psychic power. Her physical form similarly reflects the consequences of abuse, betrayal and exploitation by her father. Hubbard said that F.E.A.R. 2 was intended to explore how Alma's emotional state manifests and changes, taking the psychological consequences of abuse to an apocalyptic supernatural extreme. By contrast, the meaning and motivations of her adult manifestation were intentionally left ambiguous, with the game providing clues from which players could form their own interpretation.

In a 2019 interview, Hubbard cited Hideo Nakata's Dark Water, The Eye, Shutter, Pulse, Ju-On: The Grudge, The Sixth Sense, Fatal Frame, and personal childhood fears as further sources of inspirations behind Alma's character development.

== Appearances ==
Alma first appears in F.E.A.R., where the player's investigation into the psychic commander Paxton Fettel gradually reveals Alma as the origin of the game's supernatural events. The game presents her as a child who was exploited by Armacham Technology Corporation because of her psychic powers, placed into the Project Origin program, and used to produce psychic prototypes. Maia described Alma as the ghostly girl whose presence links the game's psychic, scientific, and supernatural horror elements, while also noting that Harlan Wade's attempt to turn his daughter into a weapon fits the game's doctor-and-monster structure.

In F.E.A.R. 2: Project Origin, Alma becomes a more direct presence. The game depicts her in both child and adult forms and links her to Sergeant Michael Becket, whose psychic compatibility makes him a target of her attention. The ending presents Alma as pregnant, a development later discussed by scholars and critics in relation to the series' treatment of sexual violence, reproduction, and female monstrosity.

In F.E.A.R. 3, Alma's pregnancy and impending childbirth become the central premise. The game follows her sons, Point Man and Paxton Fettel, as they respond to the paranormal effects of her contractions and compete over the fate of her child. Aaron Birch of Den of Geek summarized the game's premise as following from the ending of F.E.A.R. 2, with Alma pregnant and about to give birth, an event framed as catastrophic for the world. David Muiños García argued that F.E.A.R. 3 uses Alma as an example of the "phallic mother", presenting childbirth and pregnancy through horror imagery and patriarchal fear of reproductive power.

== Promotional and tie-in media ==
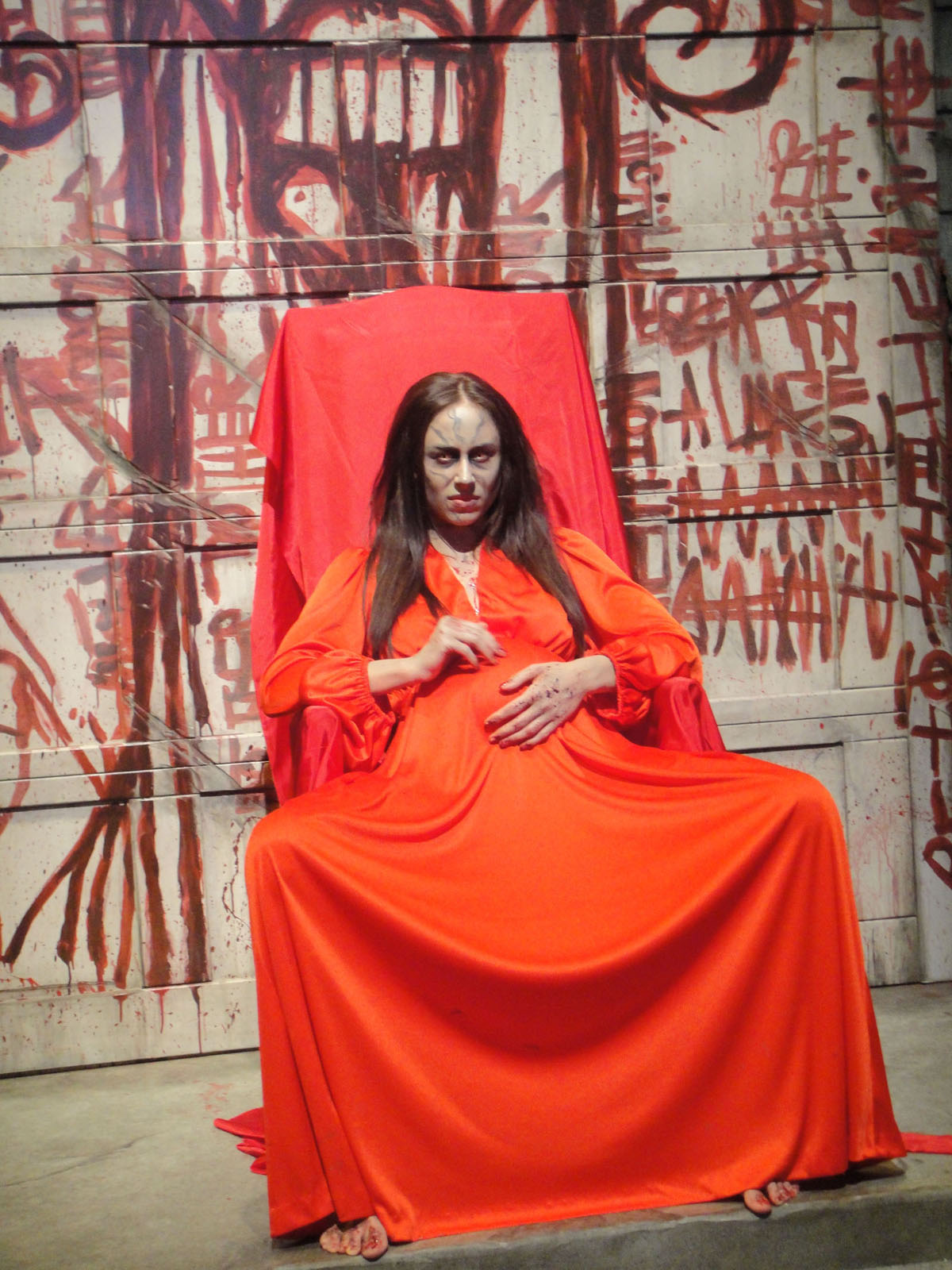
A promotional model dressed as an adult pregnant Alma Wade at E3 2010.

Alma was also used in promotional and tie-in media for the F.E.A.R. series. The F.E.A.R. Director's Edition included the live-action short "Alma Interview", which is presented a live-action "declassified" interview with Alma, along with a Dark Horse Comics prequel and other bonus material. The short is set before the first game and depicts four excerpts from an interview with the seven-year-old Alma before she is placed in Project Origin. In the interview, Alma is observed by Harlan Wade while an Armacham employee attempts to question her, with the scene showing Alma's psychic abilities, fear of the experiments, and awareness of the people who intend to use or kill her.

The Director's Edition also included a F.E.A.R. comic published by Dark Horse Comics. Written by Alden Freewater and illustrated by Edwin David, the comic serves as a prequel to the first game and expands on the opening events involving Alma and Paxton Fettel. Alma later appeared in additional tie-in comics connected with the sequels. The F.E.A.R. 2: Project Origin digital comic, created by DC Comics and released on GameTrailers in 2008, depicted the aftermath of the helicopter crash at the end of the first game. F.E.A.R. 3: Prelude, written by Steve Niles and illustrated by Stefano Raffaele, was released as a prequel comic for F.E.A.R. 3 and was distributed through Amazon pre-orders and the game's Collector's Edition.

Promotion for F.E.A.R. 3 continued to foreground Alma's pregnancy and psychic world. GamesRadar+ described the "Almaverse" trailer as a glimpse into Alma's nightmares before the release of F.E.A.R. 3. Inside Pulse similarly described the Almaverse as a space inhabited by Alma's visions that had appeared in earlier games and was losing stability as her pregnancy neared childbirth in F.E.A.R. 3. The game's Collector's Edition also included a pregnant Alma figurine with a glow-in-the-dark fetus, a detail that attracted coverage from games media because of its unusual horror-themed promotional design.

== Reception and analysis ==
=== Critical reception ===
Earlier reception emphasized Alma's memorability as a horror character. Alessandra Maia described the player's repeated hallucinations of the red-dressed girl and noting that the game's atmosphere recalls Hideo Nakata's Ringu. Richard Mitchell of Engadget similarly wrote that the Collector's Edition included a glow-in-the-dark pregnant Alma figurine, treating the item as an intentionally unsettling piece of horror-game marketing.

In a retrospective for Rolling Stone, Alma was discussed as one of gaming's notable horror antagonists, with the article framing her not only as a ghostly villain but also as a product of the abusive system that created her. GameSpot wrote that the original F.E.A.R. gave Alma's ghostly image "chilling context" by tying it to the suffering inflicted on her, while criticizing F.E.A.R. 2 for making Alma a known quantity and thereby weakening the mystery around her.

GamesRadar+ included Alma among tragic video game ghosts, emphasizing the abuse, experimentation, forced reproduction, and abandonment that turned her into a vengeful supernatural figure. In another GamesRadar+ list, Alma was ranked among the best video game villains, with the article describing her as an ambiguous antagonist whose violence is frightening but whose suffering also makes her understandable. The Age ranked Alma among the greatest Xbox characters, calling her a memorable and haunting horror-game figure and crediting her with generating anticipation for Project Origin.IGN ranked Alma 73rd on its list of top video game villains, praising the developers' low-tech horror effects and arguing that, despite superficial similarities to other ghost-girl characters, Alma belonged in a distinct league. Liz Lanier of Game Informer included Alma among the top female villains in games, writing that each of Alma's three forms carried disturbing implications for the player.

=== Japanese horror and spectrality ===
Alma has been discussed as a figure through which F.E.A.R. translates Japanese horror conventions, with its emphasis on hauntings by a ghostly female presence instead of explicit monster attacks, into a Western first-person shooter video game.

In a 2016 article published by Game Developer, Michel Sabbagh observed that Alma's appearances and powers evoke characters such as Sadako from Ring, her red dress distinguishes her from the white clothing commonly associated with yūrei in Japanese tradition, and that the name Alma means "soul" in Spanish and Portuguese. Sabbagh argued that Alma's effectiveness as a horror antagonist depends less on direct combat than on silence, uncertainty, suggestion, and environmental haunting; her ability to project visions, blur the line between the real and the imaginary, and create uncertainty over whether she is a physical threat or a mental apparition helps make her an omnipresent menace. This uncertainty over whether Alma is physically present or only a psychic projection is in Sabbagh's opinion is central to the theme of horror, because the player is encouraged to piece together her nature from environmental information rather than confront her directly. Sabbagh also argued that F.E.A.R. adapts the disease-like haunting of Ring into the idea of Alma as a toxic secret buried beneath the game world. He connected Alma's underground imprisonment and corrosive rage to Hubbard's childhood memory of the Waste Isolation Pilot Plant near his home in New Mexico and to the pollution imagery of Godzilla vs. Hedorah.

Maia emphasized the importance of sound in F.E.A.R., identifying Alma's noises, sudden darkness, blood-stained environments, and player disorientation as elements that intensify the game's psychological horror. Bernard Perron also discusses Alma in The World of Scary Video Games, identifying her as part of the first game's use of supernatural suspense and Japanese horror imagery.

In his analysis of F.E.A.R. in relation to subjective representation in video game, narratologist Jan-Noël Thon argues that the game uses hallucinatory point-of-view sequences, memory-based hallucinations, and point-of-audition effects to withhold crucial information from both the player and the player-controlled character. He argues that her appearances intensify the game's hallucinatory effects while helping generate its horror atmosphere and sense of threat. Perron similarly treats Alma as part of the game's use of ghostly suspense and audiovisual horror effects.

Justyna Janik discussed Alma in relation to spectrality in video games, identifying her as an example of a ghostly antagonist whose significance goes beyond a simple narrative trope. Janik argued that ghosts in video games can operate as part of the medium's broader relationship with memory, materiality, and the player's interaction with digital objects.

=== Monstrous feminine and motherhood themes ===
Alma has been discussed within the concept of gendered horror. Muiños García discusses Alma in relation to pregnancy and childbirth in horror games. Focusing on F.E.A.R. 3, he argues that Alma's pregnancy is presented as a near-apocalyptic event, with the Almaverse leaking into the real world through imagery of blood, swelling, contractions, and psychic disturbance. He reads the game's endings as attempts to remove Alma as a monstrous maternal threat and to bring her child into a patriarchal order through either Point Man or Paxton Fettel.

Andrei Nae's analysis of the F.E.A.R. trilogy argues that Alma functions as the series' central monstrous feminine figure, with each game attaching her to different anxieties about maternity, sexuality, and symbolic order. According to Nae, the F.E.A.R. trilogy repeatedly changes Alma's visual form in order to stage different patriarchal anxieties: the first game links her to maternal authority and abjection, F.E.A.R. 2: Project Origin foregrounds female agency and sexuality, and F.E.A.R. 3 connects her to monstrous pregnancy and birth. Nae interprets the first game as centering on the fear of matriarchal authority. In this reading, Alma's psychic influence over Paxton Fettel causes him to abandon the Symbolic order associated with paternal and corporate authority and return to the abject maternal domain. Nae also reads the child version of Alma as abject because she combines childhood, bodily fluids, morbid imagery, and the eruption of the repressed past into the present. Nae treats F.E.A.R. 2 as shifting the series toward anxieties about uncontrolled female sexual agency. The game's ending scene, in which Alma sexually assaults Becket and becomes pregnant, becomes central to this reading particularly as the player is forced to experience Becket's helplessness through a first-person perspective.. Relying on psychoanalytic and feminist film theory, Nae argues that the series' horror is built around patriarchal anxieties over maternal authority, female sexual agency, and abjection.
