= Christian Cantamessa =

Italian-American writer and director

- Born: October 4, 1976 (age 50); Savona, Italy
- Occupations: Video game writer, designer, screenwriter, film director
- Notable work: Manhunt series Grand Theft Auto: San Andreas; Red Dead Redemption; Middle-earth: Shadow of Mordor

Christian Cantamessa (born October 4, 1976, in Savona, Italy) is an Italian-American writer, director, and video game creator best known as lead designer and co-writer of Red Dead Redemption and the Manhunt series, designer on Grand Theft Auto: San Andreas, and writer of Middle-earth: Shadow of Mordor.

== Early career ==
In the early 1990s, Christian Cantamessa was a teenager from Rapallo, Italy, with no prior industry experience but a strong interest in video game development. He created the concept for a graphic adventure game centered on a small-time thief, originally titled ‘‘Steve Sailing on the Crime Wave’’. Christian met future collaborators through connections made at his father’s graphic design studio, leading to the formation of a small development team that began work on the project with financial support from his father and other early investors.

A prototype of the game was presented at the 1991 European Computer Entertainment Show (ECES) in London. Although the demo was highly unstable, the experience marked Christian’s first exposure to the international games industry. The original concept later evolved into Nippon Safes Inc., one of the early adventure games developed under the Dynabyte label. Christian eventually left the company while still attending high school, but the experience marked the beginning of his career in video games.

Christian later joined Trecision, a relatively small developer located in his home town of Rapallo. Coworkers from this era remember a collaborative, lighthearted atmosphere akin to "being back in high school," despite terrible eating habits and messy office spaces. As Trecision's financial outlook worsened, Christian and fellow programmer Tiziano Sardone chose to leave the unfinished project just before the game's release and the studio's subsequent restructuring away from traditional adventure games. Christian noted that he never actually played the finished version of his game, released with the title of The Watchmaker (video game), choosing instead to value the critical skills he developed and the lifelong industry relationships he built while there.

Immediately after leaving, he transitioned to Ubisoft's newly created Milan Studio, to focus on level design and game design.

== Rockstar Games ==
In the early 2000s, Christian joined Rockstar North, then known as DMA Design, where he worked on ‘‘Grand Theft Auto III’’ (uncredited), ‘‘Manhunt’’, and ‘‘Grand Theft Auto: San Andreas’’. Following his work on ‘‘San Andreas’’, Rockstar transferred Cantamessa to Rockstar San Diego to help lead development on the next installment in the ‘‘Red Dead’’ franchise.

Full development of ‘‘Red Dead Redemption’’ commenced in 2006, with Cantamessa serving as the game’s lead designer and co-writer. He collaborated closely with technical director Ted Carson and art directors Josh Bass and Daren Bader, both of whom had previously worked on ‘‘Red Dead Revolver’’.

== Current works ==
Christian is the founder and CEO of Sleep Deprivation Lab, which is a production company and video game consulting firm known for work on Rise of the Tomb Raider, The Crew, Forza Horizon, Middle-earth: Shadow of Mordor, and Middle-earth: Shadow of War.

He also was the director and writer of Air, a feature film released in 2015 starring Norman Reedus, Djimon Hounsou, and Sandrine Holt.

In December 2020, it was revealed that Cantamessa was working on story, world-building and cinematic direction for the reboot of Perfect Dark with Xbox's The Initiative studio. He has since left the project.

In October 2024, Cantamessa announced that he had founded a new game development company called Day 4 Night Studios, in collaboration with longtime friend Davide Soliani (creative director of Mario + Rabbids Kingdom Battle and its sequel). Cantamessa is currently the co-game director on a new original game IP. In December 2025, said IP was announced to be Bradley the Badger.

== Works ==
=== Ludography ===
Year	Game title	Role	Notes
1992	Nippon Safes Inc.	Original Concept (uncredited)	
2000	Disney's Donald Duck: Goin' Quackers	Game design (Game Boy Color version)	
2001	The Watchmaker (video game)	Game design, original story, quality assurance	
2001	Grand Theft Auto III	Game Design (uncredited)	Voice of pedestrians
2001	Rayman M	Game design (battle)	
2003	Manhunt	Lead level designer and writer	
2004	Grand Theft Auto: San Andreas	Level designer	
2007	Manhunt 2	Designer and writer	
2010	Red Dead Redemption	Lead designer and writer	Outstanding Achievement in Game Direction at 14th Annual D.I.C.E. Awards
2012	Forza Horizon	Additional writing	
2014	Middle-earth: Shadow of Mordor	Cinematics director, story	Outstanding Achievement in Story at the 18th Annual D.I.C.E. Awards; Nominated for Direction in a Game, Cinema at the NAVGTR Awards
2014	Sonic Boom: Rise of Lyric	Additional story	
2014	The Crew	Story	
2015	Rise of the Tomb Raider	Story consultant	
2017	Dead Alliance	Creative director	
2017	Middle-earth: Shadow of War	Story	
TBA	Bradley the Badger	Co-creative director alongside Davide Soliani	Music scored by Grant Kirkhope
Cancelled	Perfect Dark	Creative Consultant & Cinematics Director	

=== Filmography ===
Year	Film title	Role	Notes
2015	Air	Writer and director	Directorial feature film debut
2018	Awake	Writer	Premiered at South by Southwest 2018

=== Bibliography ===
Year	Series title	Role	Notes
2017	Kill the Minotaur	Writer	Published by Image Comics
