= Midhir =

Play-by-mail role-playing game

- Publishers: Timewyrm (UK), WORG PBM (UK)
- Genres: fantasy, role-playing
- Languages: English
- Systems: hand-moderation, mixed-moderation (hand and computer)
- Materials required: Instructions, order sheets, turn results, paper, pencil
- Media type: Play-by-mail or email

Midhir is a fantasy play-by-mail (PBM) role-playing game. It was initially hand-moderated, with a later version shifting to mixed moderation (computer and hand). It was published by Timewyrm and WORG PBM in the United Kingdom. Players rule kingdoms in the game, with various factors of gameplay including combat, politics, diplomacy, intrigue, economics, and religion. The game received some strong reviews in gaming magazines of the 1990s.

== History and development ==
Midhir was hand moderated. In 1996, Timewyrm (UK) released a version called Cities of Olynthus. Also in 1996, Midhir: Realms of Israa, was available as a mixed-moderated game. By 1997, WORG PBM (UK) was also publishing the game.

Just to clear a few things up. "Midhir" was a hand moderated game created by Timewyrm. The computerised version was written by Viking Games, Timewyrm got the right to use the software in return for the right to use the game design. The first game to use the software was "Realms of Israa" published by Viking Games. Viking also published a second game, "Empires of Corinium", about the same time as Timewyrm published "Cities of Olynthus". WORG never published any version of the game, as far as I know, and for sure, had no legal right to use the software.

== Gameplay ==
Midhir was a fantasy role-playing PBM game, "vaguely Viking/Celtic in flavour" according to reviewer Martin J. Dougherty. Players acted as a ruler of a kingdom. Combat, politics, diplomacy, intrigue, economics, and religion were all factors of gameplay.

== Reception ==
In the September 1997 issue of Games Without Frontiers, Ken Spencer stated that Midhir was "probably the best PBM game ever conceived". Martin Dougherty reviewed the game in a 1995 issue of PBMZine, stating "Midhir is the best game of its type. No, it's the best game there is." In the Flagship Summer 1995 game ratings, Midhir placed No. 11 in the Fantasy Role-Playing category, tying for first in "Value" with Land of Nevron.

== See also ==
- Delenda est Carthago
- List of play-by-mail games
- Midgard

== Bibliography ==
- Brown, Jason (June 1997). "Talking Shop: Midhir". Games Without Frontiers. No. 2. p. 39.
- Dougherty, Martin J. (August 1995). "Midhir". PBMZine. No. 2. pp. 44–45.
- Editors (Spring 1996). "Late News: Midhir". PBMZine. No. 4. p. 43.
- Editors (June 1997). "News". Games Without Frontiers. No. 2. p. 4.
- Spencer, Ken (March–April 1996). "Rules versus Roleplay". Flagship. No. 60. pp. 4–5. A review of the PBM games Midgard, Midhir, and Delenda est Carthago.
- Spencer, Ken (Summer 1996). "Midhir and Midhir: Realms of Israa". PBMZine. No. 5. pp. 43–45.
- Spencer, Ken (September 1997). "Talking Shop: Midhir". Games Without Frontiers. No. 2. p. 40.
- Tabor, Al; Palmer, Nicky (January–February 1995). "The Big Battalions: Ratings". Flagship. No. 53. p. 16.

=== Further reading ===
- Spencer, Ken (1996) [Yule 1996]. "Midhir: Realms of Israa Diary". PBMZine. No. 7. pp. 29–30.
