= Middle-earth (disambiguation) =

Middle-earth is the fictional setting of some of J. R. R. Tolkien's fantasy writings.

Middle-earth may also refer to:

- Midgard, Old English middengeard, the world of mortals in Germanic mythology
- Middle-earth in film
- Middle-earth in video games
- Middle-earth Collectible Card Game, a card game based on the Tolkien setting
- Middle-earth Role Playing, a pen and paper roleplaying game based in Middle-earth and published by Iron Crown Enterprises
- Middle Earth Housing, a student housing complex at the University of California, Irvine
- Middle Earth (album), an album by Bob Catley
- Middle Earth (club), a countercultural club and music venue in London in the late 1960s
- Middle-earth: Shadow of Mordor, a 2014 video game inspired by Tolkien
- Middle-earth: Shadow of War, a 2017 video game inspired by Tolkien

== See also ==
- Midgard (disambiguation)
