= Midgard (disambiguation) =

Midgard is the Earth in Norse mythology.

Midgard may also refer to:

- Midgard (software), an open-source content management system
- Midgard (hardware), Midgard architecture for embedded GPUs
- Midgard (album), a 2016 album by Faun
- Midgard (play-by-mail game), a play-by-mail game
- Midgard (role-playing game), a German role-playing game
- Midgard, Scotland, a location in the United Kingdom
- Midgard, a German fantasy novel by Wolfgang Hohlbein
- "Midgård", a song released by the band Therion, originally on the Secret of the Runes album
- Midgard, one of the three realms in the MMORPG Dark Age of Camelot
- Midgard I, a sailing ship later renamed Midgard IV and Dorothea Weber
- Midgard Glacier, Greenland
- Midgard Mountain, a mountain in Nunavut, Canada
- Midgard Peak, in British Columbia, Canada

== See also ==
- Middle-earth (disambiguation)
- Midgaard (Marquette, Michigan), a historic site
- Midgar, a city in the video game Final Fantasy VII
