= Davide Soliani =

Italian video game designer (born 1972)

- Soliani in Palazzo Rocca, Chiavari, 2026
- Born: 1 December 1972 (age 53); Milan, Italy
- Other names: David Soliani; The Ubisoft Crying Man
- Occupations: Video game designer; photographer
- Years active: 1999–present
- Known for: Rayman series; Mario + Rabbids series
- Website: davidesoliani.com

Davide Soliani (born 1 December 1972) is an Italian video game designer and photographer, known for developing the Rayman series and for directing the Mario + Rabbids series at Ubisoft Milan, where he worked for over twenty years until 2024.

== Early life ==
Soliani was born on 1 December 1972 in Milan, Italy. He was the only person in his family to be born in Milan, as his mother comes from Veneto, and his father comes from Emilia Romagna, though most of his family is scattered in Lombardy.

== Career ==
Soliani began his career as a game designer at Ubisoft Milan in 1999. His first project was the development of the Game Boy Color version of Rayman, released in 2000. His second project for the Game Boy Color was the platform game The Jungle Book. He has also worked on Rayman M and its American version, Rayman Arena. In 2004, he left Ubisoft for a year to work on Kuju's Battalion Wars for Nintendo GameCube.

During his career, Soliani served as creative director for the video games Mario + Rabbids Kingdom Battle and Mario + Rabbids Sparks of Hope, both of which were developed in collaboration between Ubisoft and Nintendo. In particular, the third downloadable content (DLC) for Sparks of Hope, entitled Rayman in the Phantom Show, saw the return of Rayman as the main character, which was particularly significant for Soliani, who has historical ties to the franchise.

In 2023, shortly before the release of Rayman in the Phantom Show, Soliani gave a message to the community announcing the presence of a secret message hidden upon 100% completion of the DLC, declaring his desire to "restore Rayman to the glory he deserves."

On 24 July 2024, he announced his departure from Ubisoft after more than twenty years with the company, not because of "any specific reason, but because I was searching for something that I couldn’t find there… something that we’re now creating together here".

In October 2024, he founded the independent game studio Day 4 Night Studios with Christian Cantamessa, with offices in Milan and Los Angeles. The team, supported by Krafton and 1Up Ventures, includes former developers of Just Dance, Tom Clancy's Ghost Recon, Star Wars Outlaws, and Mario + Rabbids Kingdom Battle, including key figures such as Cristina Nava, Gian Marco Zanna, and Luca Breda.

On 12 December 2025, during The Game Awards, Soliani presented the studio's first project, entitled Bradley the Badger. The video game is described as a platformer game with a meta-narrative plot and features actor Evan Peters in the lead role. The title integrates live-action scenes and will allow players to use an internal development kit.

In addition to his career in the video game industry, Soliani is also a photographer. He has developed a photography portfolio that includes projects such as "Streets of Japan", "Pryp'yat' – Chernobyl", and "Just Dance". His photographic work has also been recognized by art galleries. For example, the Blue Koi Gallery featured him as a spotlight artist, highlighting his work "Hidden Misty River" and his reflective approach to photography.

== Video games ==
Year	Title	Role
1999	Rayman (Game Boy Color version)	Game designer
2000	The Jungle Book (Game Boy Color version)	Game designer
2001	Rayman M / Rayman Arena	Game designer
2002	The Mummy: The Animated Series	Game Design Studio Manager
2004	Tom Clancy's Rainbow Six 3: Athena Sword	Lead designer
2004	Tom Clancy's Rainbow Six 3: Black Arrow	Lead designer
2005	Battalion Wars	Lead designer
2006	Open Season	Creative Direction Committee
2008	My Secret World by Imagine	Senior game/level designer
2011	Raving Rabbids: Alive & Kicking	Creative director
2012	Just Dance 4	Creative director
2013	Just Dance 2014	Creative director
2017	Mario + Rabbids Kingdom Battle	Creative director
2022	Mario + Rabbids Sparks of Hope	Creative director
TBA	Bradley the Badger	Co-creative director
