= Manhunt (video game) =

2003 stealth video game

- Developer: Rockstar North
- Publisher: Rockstar Games
- Producers: Andy Hay; Leslie Benzies
- Designer: Christian Cantamessa
- Programmers: John Whyte; Obbe Vermeij; Adam Fowler
- Artists: Andy Hay; Aaron Garbut
- Writers: Alan Davidson; James Worrall; Christian Cantamessa
- Composer: Craig Conner
- Engine: RenderWare
- Platforms: PlayStation 2; Windows; Xbox
- Release: PlayStation 2: NA: November 19, 2003; EU: November 21, 2003; Windows, Xbox: NA: April 20, 2004; EU: April 23, 2004
- Genre: Stealth
- Mode: Single-player

Manhunt is a 2003 stealth game developed by Rockstar North and published by Rockstar Games. It was released for the PlayStation 2 in November 2003, followed by Microsoft Windows and Xbox releases in April 2004. Set within the fictional Carcer City, players control a death row inmate named James Earl Cash, who is forced to participate in a series of snuff films by killing criminal gang members sent to hunt him on camera.

The game received positive reviews from critics, with praise towards its dark tone and violent gameplay, although the combat and level design were criticized. Due to its graphic violence, Manhunt was the subject of significant controversy and banned in several countries. It was also implicated in a murder by the UK media, although this accusation was later rejected by the police and courts. While not a commercial hit, Manhunt developed a substantial cult following and was followed by a stand-alone sequel, Manhunt 2, in 2007. The PlayStation 2 version of the game was re-released through the PlayStation Network for the PlayStation 3 in 2013 and PlayStation 4 in 2016, and the Xbox version was re-released in 2021 through the Xbox Backwards Compatibility program.

== Gameplay ==
An example of stealth in Manhunt; Cash hides in the shadows from a hunter, preparing to sneak up on him.

Manhunt is a stealth game played from a third-person perspective. The game consists of twenty levels, called "scenes", as well as four unlockable bonus scenes. Players survive the scenes by dispatching enemy gang members, occasionally with firearms, but primarily by stealthily executing them. At the end of each scene, players are graded based on their performance, and awarded one to five stars. Unlockable content becomes available when the player achieves three or more stars on a certain number of levels. On normal difficulty (called "Fetish"), players can earn only four stars; one is awarded for completing the scene under a certain amount of time, and one to three stars are awarded based on the brutality of the executions carried out during the scene. On hard difficulty (called "Hardcore"), players are graded out of five stars; one for speed, one to three for brutality and one for completing the scene. To gain the maximum number of stars, a set number of brutal executions must be carried out over the course of each scene; face-to-face fighting does not award stars.

To carry out executions, players must approach a hunter from behind, undetected. To facilitate this, each scene is full of "dark spots", shadows where the player can hide. Enemies cannot see into the shadows, unless they see the player actually entering the area. A standard technique in the game is to hide in the shadows and tap a wall to attract the attention of a nearby hunter. When the hunter has examined the area and is moving away, players can easily ambush and execute them. The game has three levels of execution, with each level progressively more violent and graphic than the last: "hasty" executions are quick and not very bloody, "violent" are considerably more gory, and "gruesome" are over-the-top blood-soaked murders. Players are in control of which level they use; once players have locked onto an enemy, the lock-on reticule changes color over time to indicate the three levels: white, yellow and red.

Over the course of the game, players can use a wide variety of weapons, including plastic bags, baseball bats, crowbars and a variety of bladed items. Later in the game firearms are available for use when executions become impractical. Should players take damage, their health depletes; health can be restored through the use of painkillers, which are available throughout each scene. Players have a stamina meter which depletes as they sprint, but automatically replenishes when remaining stationary. Manhunt makes use of the PlayStation 2's optional USB Microphone and the Xbox Live microphone feature on the Xbox in their respective versions of the game. When such a device is connected, players can use the sound of their own voice to distract in-game enemies and hear director's command through the Headset directly. This adds an extra element to the stealth aspect and immersion of the game, as players must refrain from making noises such as coughing as these sounds too can attract the attention of any nearby hunters.

== Synopsis ==
=== Setting ===
Manhunt is set in the fictional Carcer City, a dilapidated rust belt city rife with corruption and crime. On the prowl around the city are numerous violent gangs, who seek to find and kill the player. The game is set in a shared universe with the Grand Theft Auto series.

=== Plot ===
In 2003 in Carcer City, a journalist (Kate Miller) reports about James Earl Cash (Stephen Wilfong), a death row inmate who has been recently executed by lethal injection. However, Cash was only sedated, and awakens to an unknown voice referring to himself as "The Director" (Brian Cox), who gives him instructions through an earpiece. The Director promises Cash his freedom, but only if he kills "Hunters" – gang members sent to hunt him – in special areas around Carcer City filmed by CCTV. Cash is first pitted against the Hoods, a gang of dangerous criminals and corrupt police officers patrolling an abandoned area of the city. After eliminating them, he is abducted by the Cerberus, the Director's personal security unit, who take him to another part of Carcer City.

While the Director monitors his actions, Cash is forced to kill more criminals across various abandoned locations, including a white power skinhead gang called the Skinz, a sadistic paramilitary group called the Wardogs, an outlaw gang called the Innocentz (consisting of the Skullyz, mostly made up of Hispanic occultists, and the Babyfaces, a group of pedophiles and mentally challenged murderers), and a gang of former asylum inmates called the Smileys. Eventually, the Director betrays Cash and, after ordering the deaths of his family members, whom he had abducted, tries to murder Cash as part of his film's climax. Cash survives the trap, and escapes after vowing revenge on the Director.

The remaining Wardogs, led by the Director's right-hand man Ramirez (Chris McKinney), are sent to re-capture Cash, and they manage to trap him in a game of cat and mouse. Cash prevails and kills Ramirez and his men, before being found by the journalist reporting on him, who reveals that the Director is Lionel Starkweather, a former film producer from Los Santos who now produces for a snuff film ring. The journalist has acquired enough evidence against Starkweather to get him convicted, but needs Cash to escort her to her apartment to retrieve it. Meanwhile, Starkweather blackmails corrupt police chief Gary Schaffer into sending his men to kill Cash and the journalist, but the two manage to avoid them. After retrieving the evidence, Cash tells the journalist to leave the city with it while he goes after Starkweather.

Pursued by the police and SWAT throughout the subway and streets, Cash is eventually cornered in a train yard and almost executed. He is saved by the Cerberus, who kill the SWAT team and take Cash to Starkweather's mansion so they can execute him themselves. Cash escapes after the Cerberus are distracted when Piggsy (Hunter Platin), a chainsaw-wielding maniac that Starkweather has kept chained up in the attic, suddenly breaks free. Heading to the mansion's upper levels, Cash uses stealth attacks to fight Piggsy and tricks him into standing on a grate, which collapses under his weight, allowing Cash to take Piggsy's chainsaw and kill him with it. After eliminating the remaining Cerberus, Cash confronts Starkweather in his office and murders him with the chainsaw. The media and police arrive at the mansion as the journalist exposes Starkweather's snuff ring and police complicity, leading to Schaffer being criminally prosecuted for corruption. Cash, however, is nowhere to be found.

== Development ==
Rockstar North began development of Manhunt in 2000, building the game with the RenderWare engine that had been used for the Grand Theft Auto titles. In September 2003, GamesMaster published a preview of Manhunt, commenting "[Rockstar North has] scraped its imagination to further twist the way games are made in the future and delivers a chiseled, no-apologies assault on gaming standards. [...] it possesses a warped subtlety that questions game reality... It creates a barren, harsh, violent experience and then punctures it with something trippy and darkly comic..." In a retrospective piece, a former Rockstar employee admitted that the game almost caused a mutiny in the company, saying that the team had "already weathered plenty of controversy over GTA III and Vice City—we were no strangers to it—but Manhunt felt different. With GTA, we always had the excuse that the gameplay was untethered—you never had to hurt anybody that wasn't a "bad guy" in one of the missions. You could play completely ethically if you wanted, and the game was parody anyway, so lighten up".

Manhunt was announced at E3 in May 2003. The game was originally slated for an October release date, and it was eventually released for the PlayStation 2 on November 19, 2003, in North America, followed by a European release on November 21. During its first month on sale, the game sold 75,000 copies in the United States, "a fraction" of the copies sold by Grand Theft Auto III and Grand Theft Auto: Vice City, games also distributed by Rockstar. In spite of these comparatively poor sales, the game received a port for Windows and the Xbox, released in North America on April 20, 2004, and in Europe on April 23. Rockstar released exclusive merchandise, limited editions and pre-order bonuses such as official soundtracks, a Piggsy figure, and a handheld voice changer.

The game was added to Steam in January 2008. Manhunt was included for free for players who pre-ordered the PC version of Manhunt 2 in November 2009. On May 14, 2013, Manhunt was made available for purchase on the PlayStation 3 under the PlayStation Network's PS2 Classics category. It was released again for the PlayStation 4 on March 22, 2016, with 1080p and trophy support. The Xbox version was re-released on the Xbox storefront for Xbox One and Xbox Series systems in 2021.

== Reception ==
Reception

Aggregate score
Aggregator	Score		
Aggregator	PC	PS2	Xbox
Metacritic	75/100	76/100	74/100

Review scores
Publication	Score		
Publication	PC	PS2	Xbox
Computer Games Magazine	2/5	N/A	N/A
Computer Gaming World	2.5/5	N/A	N/A
Electronic Gaming Monthly	N/A	6.83/10	N/A
Eurogamer	N/A	7/10	6/10
Game Informer	N/A	9.25/10	9/10
GamePro	N/A	4/5	3.5/5
GameRevolution	B	B	B
GameSpot	8.3/10	8.4/10	8.3/10
GameSpy	4/5	4/5	4/5
GameZone	8/10	8.3/10	8.3/10
IGN	8.3/10	8.5/10	8.3/10
Official U.S. PlayStation Magazine	N/A	3.5/5	N/A
Official Xbox Magazine (US)	N/A	N/A	4.5/10
PC Gamer (US)	78%	N/A	N/A
Entertainment Weekly	N/A	A−	N/A
Maxim	N/A	10/10	N/A

The PlayStation 2 and PC versions of Manhunt received "generally favorable reviews", while the Xbox version received "mixed or average" reviews, according to the review aggregation website Metacritic. As of March 26, 2008, the Manhunt series has sold 1.7 million copies worldwide. At the 7th Annual Interactive Achievement Awards, the game was nominated for "Console Action/Adventure Game of the Year". Manhunt received a "Gold" sales award from the Entertainment and Leisure Software Publishers Association (ELSPA), indicating sales of at least 200,000 copies in the United Kingdom.

The game's dark nihilistic tone and violent nature were singled out by many critics as representing something unique in the world of video gaming. GameSpot concluded that, "like it or not, the game pushes the envelope of video game violence and shows you countless scenes of wholly uncensored, heavily stylized carnage". Game Informer praised the PS2 version's audacity and competent technical capabilities, stating "it's a frightening premise that places gamers in a psychological impasse. The crimes that you commit are unspeakable, yet the gameplay that leads to these horrendous acts is so polished and fierce that it's thrilling." IGN complimented the same console version's overall challenge, calling it a "solid, deep experience for seasoned gamers pining for some hardcore, challenging games". Edge gave the same console version eight out of ten, saying, "Like GTA there's more to this than shock and awe. Within its linear structure there is a lot of freedom within which to act, much more so than both Splinter Cell and Metal Gear Solid 2, the titles which Manhunt most closely resembles."

Toronto Star writer Ben Rayner, praised the relevance of the game, defending its violence and graphic nature as very much a product of its time, and condemning calls to have it banned;

As entertainment and cultural artefact, Manhunt is totally disturbing. But so is the evening news, the "I'll eat anything for money" lunacy of Fear Factor and the unfettered, misanthropic gunplay of Bad Boys II, so I will defend until my last breath Rockstar's right to sell this stuff to me and anyone else who wants it. ... Do I think games such as these could have dire psychological consequences, particularly for young people? As always, I remain agnostic on the matter. Who knows, really? The debate will never be resolved. The American military obviously thinks there's something there: The troubling new TV ad campaign for the U.S. reserves lures potential young soldiers with tales of adventure accompanied by blatant, video-game-styled animation. And, curiously, no one has complained about or tried to ban SOCOM U.S. Navy SEALs, in which stealth and killing figure even more heavily than in Manhunt.

The Chicago Tribune was especially complimentary of the game, arguing that it marked a significant moment in video gaming history;

Manhunt is easily the most violent game ever made. It will likely be dismissed by many as a disgusting murder simulator with no reason to exist. But Manhunt also is the Clockwork Orange of video games, holding your eyes open so as to not miss a single splatter – asking you, is this really what you enjoy watching? Had Manhunt been poorly made, using the snuff film angle as a cheap gimmick, the game would have been shameful and exploitative. What elevates it to a grotesque, chilling work of art is both presentation and game play. Manhunt is solid as a game; it's engaging to use stealth as you creep through the streets of this wicked city, using your smarts to avoid death, while dishing out much of your own. If Manhunt succeeds at retail, it will say more about America's fascination with violence than any political discourse or social debate. That makes Manhunt the most important video game of the last five years.

The game received some criticism. Certain gameplay elements, such as the shooting mechanics, were called "frustrating" by Eurogamer, who claimed that "more than half the time the targeting reticule refuses to acknowledge an oncoming enemy until they're virtually in front of you." GameSpot concurred, noting that the "AI is much worse in the more action-oriented levels". 1UP.com said that one quickly became "tired of [the] violence ... AI quirks [and] repetitive level design."

== Controversies ==
Manhunt attracted controversy due to its graphic execution scenes. In this particular execution, Cash suffocates an enemy with a plastic bag.

The controversy surrounding the game stems primarily from the graphic manner in which the player executes enemies. In 2007, former Rockstar employee Jeff Williams revealed that even the game's staff were somewhat uncomfortable about the level of violence; "there was almost a mutiny at the company over that game." Williams explained that the game "just made us all feel icky. It was all about the violence, and it was realistic violence. We all knew there was no way we could explain away that game. There was no way to rationalize it. We were crossing a line."

The violence in the game drew the attention of U.S. Representative Joe Baca, who was the sponsor of a legislation to fine those who sell adult-themed games to players younger than 17. Baca said of Manhunt, "it's telling kids how to kill someone, and it uses vicious, sadistic and cruel methods to kill". The media was drawn into the debate. For example, The Globe and Mail wrote "Manhunt is a venal disconnect for the genre. There's no challenge, just assembly-line, ritualistic slaughter. It's less a video game and more a weapon of personal destruction. This is about stacking bodies. Perhaps the scariest fact of all: Manhunt is so user-friendly that any sharp 12-year-old could navigate through the entire game in one sitting."

=== Murder of Stefan Pakeerah ===
On July 28, 2004, the game was linked to the murder of 14-year-old Stefan Pakeerah by 17-year-old Warren Leblanc in Leicestershire, England. Initial media reports claimed that police had found a copy of the game in Leblanc's bedroom. Giselle and Patrick Pakeerah, the victim's parents, claimed that the game had influenced LeBlanc and played a role in the murder. The Entertainment and Leisure Software Publishers' Association (ELSPA) offered sympathy to the Pakeerah family but rejected any connection between the game and the murder. ELSPA also noted that the game was rated 18 by the British Board of Film Classification and was not intended for minors. Due to controversy, the game was removed from shelves by some vendors, including Game and Dixons. In response, Rockstar reiterated that it was intended for adults and denied any link to the murder. Media speculation of a potential ban on the game increased demand for it at physical and online retailers. Giselle Pakeerah stated her disappointment over the increased interest in the game.

On July 30, 2004, American attorney Jack Thompson, an advocate against violence in video games, claimed to have warned Rockstar prior to the game's release that it could inspire copycat killings. On August 2, 2004, it was reported that the Pakeerahs had hired Thompson to represent them in a £50 million wrongful death claim against Sony Computer Entertainment (SCE) and Rockstar Games. That day, the police officially denied any link between the game and the murder, citing drug-related robbery as the motive and revealing that the game had been found in Pakeerah's bedroom, not Leblanc's as originally reported. At the conclusion of the investigation, the police reaffirmed that they could not find sufficient evidence linking the game to the murder. The presiding judge placed sole responsibility with Leblanc after sentencing him to life.

There was renewed controversy after the announcement of Manhunt 2 in February 2007, with the Pakeerahs condemning its release. Rockstar's parent company Take-Two Interactive issued a statement that "the Judge, defense, prosecution and Leicester police" in the case had refuted any connection to the game. Jack Thompson unsuccessfully attempted to have Manhunt 2 banned, claiming that Take-Two had lied about the incident and that police were incorrect in asserting the game had belonged to Pakeerah.

=== Legal status ===
In New Zealand, the game was banned on December 11, 2003, with possession deemed an offence. Bill Hastings, the Chief Censor, stated "it's a game where the only thing you do is kill everybody you see ... You have to at least acquiesce in these murders and possibly tolerate, or even move towards enjoying them, which is injurious to the public good." In 2023, the Office reconsidered Manhunt and classified it R18.

In Australia, the game was initially allowed under a MA15+ classification, but this decision was reversed by the Australian Classification Board in September 2004, after an appeal by the Attorney-General Philip Ruddock. As a consequence, the game was effectively banned, mandating a recall of all copies still being sold in stores. Before its recall, Manhunt had already sold 18,000 units in Australia.

In Canada, following a meeting in Toronto on December 22, 2003, between Hastings and officials from the Ontario Ministry of Consumer and Business Services, Manhunt became the first video game in Ontario to be classified as a film and was restricted to adults on February 3, 2004. Apart from Ontario, however, Manhunt had little or no classification problems elsewhere in North America. The British Columbia Film Classification Office reviewed the game after the controversy in Ontario and deemed the Mature rating by the ESRB to be appropriate.

In Germany, the Amtsgericht in Munich confiscated the PlayStation 2 version of Manhunt on July 19, 2004, for violation of § 131 StGB ("representation of violence"). According to the court, the game portrays the killing of humans as fun. They also said it glorified vigilantism, which they considered harmful. All other versions got indexed.

In Thailand, the government tagged Manhunt a violent video game in August 2008, following the murder of a taxi driver in Bangkok who was killed by an 18-year-old man obsessed with GTA IV. As a result, the government banned the sale of GTA and labeled numerous other games, including Manhunt.

=== Steam release crack protection issues ===
To combat piracy, the retail version contained two layers of digital rights management (DRM): the SecuROM system and several game-breaking mechanisms that are activated when SecuROM is missing. To ship the game to Steam without third party DRM, Rockstar Games re-released it with an existing crack by Razor 1911. As this was uncovered in 2010, the company quickly released a new version of the retail release with only SecuROM removed. The proprietary measures were not addressed, leading to a broken version being sold on Steam. Prior to 2023, the crack protection mechanisms, such as gates and doors not working properly blocking progress through the game, were interpreted as issues with compatibility on newer operating systems. However, it was discovered the Steam release had crack protection measures active despite being an official release due to the incomplete removal of the DRM.

== Legacy ==
Manhunt has garnered a cult following among fans, and was cited by a Vice article in March 2016 as one of Rockstar's "very best" games. Likewise, Game Informer considered the game a "dark, underappreciated masterpiece". It was recognised as an example of the "best of gaming horror" by VentureBeat in October 2011, included in the 1001 Video Games You Must Play Before You Die in 2010, and listed at #85 in IGN's "Top 100 PlayStation 2 Games" that same year.

A sequel, Manhunt 2, was released in October 2007 in the United States and October 2008 in Europe. Although the sequel retains many of the stealth elements used in its predecessor, Manhunt 2's storyline is completely unrelated to the first game.
