= Bradley the Badger =

Upcoming video game

- Developer: Day 4 Night Studios
- Publisher: Focus Entertainment
- Directors: Davide Soliani; Christian Cantamessa
- Composer: Grant Kirkhope
- Platform: Windows
- Genre: Platform
- Mode: Single-player

Bradley the Badger is an upcoming 3D platformer developed by Day 4 Night Studios and published by Focus Entertainment for Microsoft Windows.

== Gameplay and premise ==
The game follows a anthropomorphic badger-like mascot named Bradley, who's the star of his own game, Bradley the Badger, developed from a fictional game company Dreamwoods Games. However, when excited about his platforming game one morning, he discovers his world has become unfinished through spoofed games from Badgerborne to Cyberbadger, all themed around Bradley but taken to a glitched turn. Players control Bradley through these worlds and using a special game controller, you can control the worlds around you through special black and white assets from resizing them to copying them or turn Bradley into a ball to roll up assets or enter small buildings.

== Development ==
The game was announced at the pre-show of The Game Awards 2025 on December 11, with Evan Peters voicing the titular character. Core gameplay of Bradley the Badger is being described as Mario meets Portal, and a love letter to video games with parody references such as Bloodborne, The Last of Us and Cyberpunk 2077. The game will also feature live-action sequences, akin to Who Framed Roger Rabbit and The Lego Movie. It was then announced on June 10, 2026, that Focus Entertainment will be publishing the game in a partnership with developer Day 4 Night Studios.
