= Air (2015 film) =

2015 film by Christian Cantamessa

- Theatrical release poster
- Directed by: Christian Cantamessa
- Written by: Christian Cantamessa; Chris Pasetto
- Produced by: David Alpert; Chris Ferguson; Brian Kavanaugh-Jones; Robert Kirkman
- Starring: Norman Reedus; Djimon Hounsou; Sandrine Holt
- Cinematography: Norm Li
- Edited by: Greg Ng
- Music by: Edo Van Breemen
- Production companies: Stage 6 Films; Automatik; Skybound Entertainment
- Distributed by: Stage 6 Films; Vertical Entertainment
- Release date: August 14, 2015
- Running time: 95 minutes
- Country: United States
- Language: English

Air is a 2015 American post-apocalyptic film directed by Christian Cantamessa and written by Cantamessa and Chris Pasetto. Starring Norman Reedus, Djimon Hounsou and Sandrine Holt, the film depicts a dystopian future following a biochemical weapons disaster which has wiped out most of mankind and rendered the air unbreathable. The film focuses on a group of survivors in an underground facility as they struggle to survive after an equipment failure. Produced by Skybound Entertainment, the film was released in the United States on August 14, 2015. It received generally negative reviews from critics.

== Plot ==
A biochemical weapons-catastrophe has wiped out most of mankind and rendered the air unbreathable. The U.S. government hastily built a few makeshift underground bunkers in which a few scientists are kept in cryogenic sleep until the air is no longer toxic. Each of those bunkers is kept up by a couple of maintenance workers who are wakened for two hours every six months to perform routine tasks and inspections to keep the facility going.

Two workers of such a facility, Cartwright and Bauer, go about their normal list of tasks during one wake-cycle. Cartwright has occasional visions of his wife Abby, and has conversations with her, to Bauer's annoyance.

Just as the two hours are almost over, Cartwright's sleeping chamber is destroyed by a fire that was caused by recent seismic activity. The two frantically locate the valve for the emergency air-supply, and then try to find a spare chamber for Cartwright to sleep in.

The chamber is operational, and Bauer chooses to use it. The chamber malfunctions and almost suffocates Bauer until Cartwright finally appears and cuts him free, destroying the chamber in the process.

With no other spare chamber in the facility, Bauer insists that they eject a random sleeping person to allow Cartwright to occupy that chamber. Cartwright refuses to send anyone to their death, and insists there is another way. He exits the facility in a hazmat suit in an attempt to enter a nearby sister-facility, with Bauer on the radio helping him navigate. Cartwright encounters several corpses as he makes his way through air ducts.

When he finally enters the facility, he realizes that everybody there is dead, and has been for a long time. Although the computer system has reported all facility workers to be alive and well during the previous wake -cycles, it is apparent that this was a ruse to make the workers believe they're not alone, for them to stay sane.

At the same time, Bauer reviews the security-footage and realizes that Cartwright was standing next to him the entire time while he almost suffocated in the spare chamber, indicating that Cartwright had tried to kill him, and only decided against it in the last minute.

As Cartwright returns to their own facility, Bauer confronts him with a gun. A chase through the facility ensues, with Cartwright finally getting the upper hand by sneaking up on Bauer and injecting a large dose of morphine into him. Bauer accepts his fate, and makes peace with Cartwright before passing out.

In an epilogue, Cartwright wakes up for another cycle, having grown a short beard, indicating substantial time passed. The air is breathable again, and the facility's system is automatically waking up all the sleepers, who exit their chambers and walk up to the Earth's surface, with Abby among them.

== Cast ==
- Norman Reedus as Bauer
- Djimon Hounsou as Cartwright
- Sandrine Holt as Abby
- Peter Benson as Anchorman
- David Nykl as Sleeper 1

== Reception ==
On Rotten Tomatoes the film has a score of 17% based on reviews from 12 critics. On Metacritic, the film has a score of 33 out of 100 based on reviews from 6 critics, indicating "generally unfavorable" reviews.

Alan Scherstuhl at The Village Voice said in his review that the film consisted of "too many" scenes of "dudes chasing each other with guns", while Ken Jawororski in The New York Times praised the acting of Hounsou and Reedus, while concluding that "the script would benefit from more moments when hard questions are considered and unexpected actions are taken".

Jami Philbrick in CraveOnline praised the film, stating that "Air succeeds where many sci-fi movies fail, by making an unbelievable story completely believable", and commented further that "filmmaker Christian Cantamessa makes a stunning directorial debut with his new movie". James Thomas in Movie Pilot was impressed by the style of the film, stating that Air is "a love letter to the dystopian sci-fi movies we grew up loving from the late 70s and 80s".
