= Murder of Khuan Phokaeng =

2008 murder in Bangkok, Thailand

- Location: Bangkok, Thailand
- Date: 2 August 2008; 18 years ago
- Attack type: Murder by stabbing
- Victim: Khuan Phokaeng
- Perpetrator: Polwat Chinno (Note: Spelled Phalawat by some sources)
- Motive: Addiction to Grand Theft Auto IV and financial desperation

On 2 August 2008, 50-year-old taxi driver Khuan Phokaeng, was murdered in Bangkok, Thailand, by 18-year-old Polwat Chinno, a secondary school student who was addicted to playing the video game Grand Theft Auto IV, claiming during interrogation that he wanted to know if "pulling off a carjacking was as easy in real life as it was in the video game." The case prompted a nationwide ban on the sale of Grand Theft Auto games in Thailand.

== Background ==
Khuan Phokaeng was, at the time of his murder, a 50-year-old taxi driver in Bangkok, though he was originally from Maha Sarakham province, in northeastern Thailand. (Note: Some sources describe Khuan as 54-year-old, while others as 50-year-old.)

Polwat Chinno was an 18-year-old secondary school student whose addiction to the video game Grand Theft Auto IV had become so severe that he told police that he needed money to play the game every day because his daily allowance of 100 baht did not support his habits, adding that his parents were civil servants and did not earn well. He lived with his parents and a younger sister. Despite the nature of his actions, Polwat's parents described him as "polite" and a "good student." His mother tearfully defended him following his arrest, warning parents about their children's video game addictions and vowing to not abandon her son. On the other hand, Polwat's father said that his family was hardworking and that they could not afford bail or defense counsel for Polwat.

== Murder ==
Late on the night of Saturday, 2 August 2008, Polwat flagged down a taxi in the Bang Phlat district, though he desisted from his intentions to rob the driver after seeing that many people were around. He subsequently purchased two knives using his allowance of 500 baht at a local retail store in the area and stopped another cab, driven by Khuan Phokaeng. According to his testimony, Polwat directed Khuan to drive to a dark street in the same district as a means to secure a successful robbery. Upon arriving at this place, Polwat pulled out the knife and threatened Khuan with it. Khuan resisted the assault and pulled out a metal bar from beneath his seat, fighting back at Polwat, who stabbed him more than 10 times in the ensuing confrontation.

After severely wounding Khuan, Polwat took control of the car and drove off. He was arrested hours later, on Sunday 3 August, while trying to steer the car backwards out of a Bangkok street. Neighbors in the area called police after hearing Polwat constantly honk the horn and reverse into a dead end. When police arrived, Polwat briefly barricaded himself inside the car until police were able to arrest him. Khuan was found dead inside the cab.

== Aftermath ==
Polwat was charged with armed robbery resulting in death (murder) and possession of a weapon. Under those charges, Polwat was eligible for the death penalty by lethal injection. In the hours following the arrest, Polwat was held pending further investigations. He confessed to the crime, saying that he wanted to imitate the game Grand Theft Auto IV and that he was tired of not having enough money to afford his gaming habits. Polwat also stated that his father "drank too much" and physically abused his mother. When asked about any addiction, Polwat denied substance dependence and gambling, additionally denying premeditation to murder, instead saying that it was a robbery gone wrong.

During the interrogations, Polwat also confessed to having wanted to see if carjacking was "as easy in real life as it was in the game," referring to GTA. The following day, the Manager Daily reported that police were preparing a reenactment of the crime scene and that they believed that Polwat did not suffer from any mental illness that impeded him from knowing right from wrong. The newspaper added that investigators would oppose the possibility of bail in the indictment hearing against Polwat before the Taling Chan Provincial Court.

Although the specifics of Polwat's legal fate are not widely known, his case prompted a nationwide ban on the sale of Grand Theft Auto, especially Grand Theft Auto IV, which was then on sale in Thailand. The killing of Khuan also led to social debate about video game addiction among children and teenagers, as well as business responsibility over the effects of these games on young people's mental health. Manon Phokhaeng, the 25-year-old son of the victim, filed a lawsuit against New Era Interactive Media, the Thai distributor of the game. The company issued a statement expressing regret for the killing.

Before the murder of Khuan, the Ministry of Culture had sought regulations in the sales of games like GTA. After the killing, an official inside the ministry stated that the "time bomb had exploded" and that it could worsen, adding that "today it was a cab driver, but tomorrow it could be a video game shop owner." The government subsequently tagged 10 video games as violent, including Resident Evil 4, God of War, Hitman: Blood Money, Killer7, The Godfather, and Manhunt, among others.
