= Mario + Rabbids Sparks of Hope =

2022 video game

- Promotional artwork, depicting Mario, Edge, Rabbid Peach and Starburst, one of the eponymous Sparks
- Developers: Ubisoft Milan; Ubisoft Paris (Note: Additional work by Ubisoft Chengdu, Ubisoft Shanghai, Ubisoft Montpellier, Ubisoft Barcelona, Ubisoft Pune, Ubisoft Bucharest and Ubisoft Toronto)
- Publisher: Ubisoft
- Directors: Davide Soliani; Damiano Moro
- Producers: Xavier Manzanares; Gian Marco Zanna; Zou Yang; Toyokazu Nonaka
- Designer: Ugo Laviano
- Programmers: Syvain Glaize; Tiziano Sardone
- Artists: Mauro Perini; Fabrizio Stibiel
- Writers: Andrea Babich; Edward Kuehnel
- Composers: Yoko Shimomura; Grant Kirkhope; Gareth Coker; Christophe Héral
- Series: Mario; Rabbids; Mario + Rabbids
- Engine: Snowdrop
- Platform: Nintendo Switch
- Release: October 20, 2022
- Genres: Tactical role-playing, action-adventure
- Mode: Single-player

Mario + Rabbids Sparks of Hope (Note: Known in Japan as Mario + Rabbids Galaxy Battle (Japanese: マリオ+ラビッツ ギャラクシーバトル, Hepburn: Mario + rabittsu gyarakushībatoru)) (Note: French: Mario + The Lapins Crétins: Sparks of Hope) is a 2022 action-adventure tactical role-playing game developed by Ubisoft Milan and Ubisoft Paris and published by Ubisoft for the Nintendo Switch. The game is a crossover between Nintendo's Mario and Ubisoft's Rabbids franchises and the sequel to Mario + Rabbids Kingdom Battle (2017). A trio of expansion packs were released the following year, with the third and final one featuring Rayman. Sparks of Hope received generally positive reviews from critics, with praise towards the game's graphics, soundtrack, gameplay and improvements to the battle system, though the loading times received some criticism. According to Ubisoft, the game underperformed commercially. This game marks the final Mario franchise title to feature longtime voice actor Charles Martinet performing as Mario and Luigi (albeit through archival voice clips), prior to him stepping down from his various roles in the series in 2023 to become a brand ambassador for the property.

== Gameplay ==
Gameplay in Sparks of Hope is largely similar to that of Kingdom Battle. Players are able to build out their roster of characters from returning characters Mario, Luigi and Peach, along with their Rabbid counterparts. New characters feature Edge (a girl), a Rosalina-like Rabbid and Bowser have also joined the team (with the Rabbids being fully voiced for the first time). Players are also tasked with rescuing the Sparks throughout the galaxy, who provide distinct powers that will help the player in battle.

Unlike the first game, level designs are less linear, and the turn-based tactical combat features a new system that disregards the first game's grid-based layout. Also featured are enemy encounters outside of turn-based combat. Mario can now be replaced by a different character. Lead designer Xavier Manzanares, speaking about the new combat, stated: "You can move in this area of movement the way you want; you can dash a Bob-omb, then you have it in your hand. You can move around as you want, but then it's going to explode. So, you have a few seconds to react, which is completely different from what we had in the past. And so, it brings this real-time element to the mix".

== Plot ==
Some time following the Megabug anomaly's vanquishment (Note: As depicted in the 2017 video game Mario + Rabbids Kingdom Battle), the inhabitants of the Mushroom Kingdom, including Mario, Luigi and Princess Peach, now peacefully coexist with the Rabbids and the group's counterparts, who have all learned to speak. The calm is suddenly broken when hybrids of Rabbids and Lumas known as Sparks appear, pursued by a gigantic and manta ray-like creature imbued with Darkmess, a shadowy and corruptive substance. Rabbid Peach is accidentally abducted by the manta while attempting to take a selfie; Mario and Beep-0 free her from a pocket dimension inside the creature with the help of the Sparks. A malevolent entity known as Cursa then appears and attempts to assault the trio, but the other heroes save them with the WM-ARC (acronym for Washing Machine Advanced Rabbid Carrier), a spaceship constructed from the Rabbids' Time Washing Machine. Its artificial intelligence, JEANIE, explains that the unique fusion of Rabbid and Luma DNA grants the Sparks unlimited power and Cursa, whose corruptive influence has spread across the galaxy, wants to absorb that power for itself. The team resolves to find Cursa's stronghold and defeat them, saving as many Sparks and corrupted planets as possible, while also searching for Rosalina, the missing guardian of the Lumas.

Mario's team travels to five different planets while gathering enough purified sources of the Darkmess to safely travel to Cursa's stronghold – Beacon Beach, Pristine Peaks, Palette Prime, Terra Flora and Barrendale Mesa. They are joined by three new heroes along the way: Edge, a stoic sword-wielding Rabbid also looking to save the Sparks; Rabbid Rosalina, a gloomy but intelligent Rabbid who is searching for her original counterpart as she idolizes her; and Bowser, Mario and company's perpetual arch-enemy whose minions have been brainwashed by Cursa. Together, they help the wardens of each planet dispel the Darkmess infection while also battling Cursa's forces consisting of newly corrupted Rabbids, Bowser's brainwashed minions and the Spark Hunters – a trio of Rabbid-like villainesses that consist of the phantasmal Midnite, the blocky Bedrock and the plant-based Daphne. Near the end of their journey, Cursa once again confronts the heroes but unexpectedly transforms into Rosalina, who has been possessed by the entity. Rosalina gives the team a purified Darkmess source and helps them escape before Cursa regains control; from the source, they learn that Cursa was originally a surviving part of the Megabug, which was cast out into space and eventually gained sentience after being mutated by intergalactic debris, desiring to feed upon the life energies of the galaxy to adapt to its new form. It would soon besiege the Comet Observatory, home to Rosalina, the Lumas and later a group of Rabbids who came by on another version of the Time Washing Machine, in an attempt to steal the power of both the area and the Lumas, but inadvertently transfigured the latter and Rabbids together when Rosalina sacrificed herself to ensure their safety, resulting in the Sparks' existence. Cursa now seeks to use their power in order to maintain its possession of Rosalina.

The team reaches Cursa's stronghold and destroys its protective shield with one of the wardens' inventions, revealing the Comet Observatory. In a frantic attempt to stop them, Cursa creates doppelgängers of Bowser and Edge derived from the Megabug's and her respective record of their DNA; Edge confesses that she is also a creation of Cursa and was once the leader of the Spark Hunters, but betrayed her creator after gaining free will while her comrades maintained their loyalty to Cursa. Although she attempts to leave in shame, the other heroes refuse to cast her out and at last confront Cursa. After a protracted battle, Cursa releases both Rosalina and the energy of the absorbed Sparks, but makes one last-ditch effort to defeat them after assuming an independent form. The heroes, the Sparks and Rosalina all combine their power into a final attack which vanquishes Cursa. Everyone returns to the Mushroom Kingdom, where Rosalina congratulates them for their heroism. Both Rabbid Rosalina and Edge decide to stay with the heroes and Rosalina gives a final grateful regard to Mario and Bowser, the latter of whom resumes his rivalry with his enemies, before departing. Meanwhile, Beep-0 connects with the now-sentient JEANIE in a post-credits scene.

=== The Tower of Doooom ===
The heroes are summoned by Madame Bwahstrella, a fortune teller Rabbid from the main and previous games, to a large tower called the Tower of Doooom. She tasks them with rescuing Spawny, who is held hostage at the top of the tower by Cursa's minions. Once Spawny is rescued, he bids the heroes farewell and leaves to continue traveling the galaxy.

=== The Last Spark Hunter ===
Taking place after defeating Daphne and before reaching Cursa's stronghold, the heroes travel to the musical Melodic Gardens after discovering that it has gone silent. The atmosphere, having been affected by the Darkmess, also prevents them from leaving. There, they meet Allegra, the planet's warden, who informs them of the threat. The mastermind behind it is revealed to be Kanya, a fourth Spark Hunter who Edge does not know of. Like Edge, she betrayed Cursa, but with malicious intent of her own. Kanya then summons a King Bob-omb-based battle mech to attack the heroes, but they manage to defeat it. Despite this, Kanya remains unfazed and leaves. Later, the heroes find Allegra's friend Dorrie, a dinosaur who is the source of the Melodic Gardens' biophonies, that are a part of the planet, imprisoned in a cage. Kanya arrives in a more powerful King Bob-omb mech, revealing that the one they defeated earlier was a prototype and that she was testing them earlier to make improvements to her final design. After freeing Dorrie, the heroes then defeat Kanya, who is then sent flying along with her mech. With the Melodic Gardens now back to normal, the heroes can now leave to confront Cursa as Allegra wishes them luck in their adventure.

=== Rayman in the Phantom Show ===
This story takes place some time after the main story. Rayman receives a ticket to a film studio called the Space Opera Network. Arriving there, he meets Rabbid Mario, Rabbid Peach and Beep-0, who have also received tickets of their own. Rayman is uneasy towards the former two due to his past with their kind, but Beep-0 assures him that the duo are different. They learn that the studio is owned by the Phantom, a transfigured Rabbid encountered near the end of the Megabug incident. Beep-0 assumes that he is intent on avenging his previous defeat, but the Phantom claims that he has reformed, though he and Rayman remain unconvinced. The Phantom reveals that it was he who summoned them here due to Darkmess infecting his studio and wants them to exterminate it. The group fight through hordes of Darkmess enemies throughout each studio set. Once all of it is gone, The Phantom invites them to his control room, which is where the warp portal that brought the group to the studio is located, only to find it inoperable. The Phantom then confesses that he had been lying about his reformation all along and is indeed seeking revenge, confirming Beep-0 and Rayman's earlier suspicions. He wanted the heroes to get rid of the Darkmess so that he can carry out his scheme. After they defeat him, the warp portal reactivates, allowing the heroes to return home. Rayman decides to remain at the studio to supervise the Rabbids there after finally seeing the good in their kind. Rabbid Mario gives Rayman a hug, while Rabbid Peach gives a present to the latter as he does the same, showing that Rayman is now on good terms with the Rabbids. In the credits, a pair of photos are shown – one with the heroes showing their friends the gift that Rayman gave them, one of his outfits, and the other showing Rayman with the gift he received – a handicrafted replica of Mario's cap that additionally has Rabbid ears.

== Development ==
Mario + Rabbids Sparks of Hope was announced at E3 2021 and released on October 20, 2022. The game was a co-op development by Ubisoft Paris and Ubisoft Milan, with additional work by Ubisoft Pune, Ubisoft Chengdu and Ubisoft Montpellier. Creative director Davide Soliani stated that the development team had viewed the game as a spiritual successor to the first, and as a different take on the tactical genre in part due to the game having expanded beyond the Mushroom Kingdom to focus on a range of galactic locations. Its soundtrack was written by Grant Kirkhope (who composed the soundtrack for the first game), Gareth Coker (who composed the soundtrack for Ubisoft's Immortals Fenyx Rising), and Yoko Shimomura (who previously composed for the Mario & Luigi and Kingdom Hearts series). According to producer Xavier Manzanares, Yoshi was not made playable because the development team was trying to evolve what they had in Kingdom Battle and thus decided to not have the exact same team of heroes. When asked about why Rosalina was not made playable, Soliani cited her tall height, which would have caused technical issues, as well as her being "too powerful" as the key factors.

The game received three downloadable content expansions via a season pass in 2023, with the third and final one featuring Rayman.

These three expansions include the rogue-like The Tower of Doooom, a mid-game adventure titled The Last Spark Hunter featuring a villain named Kanya in an enchanted forest–like planet called the Melodic Gardens, and Rayman in the Phantom Show. The first was released on March 2, 2023, the second was released on June 21, 2023, and the third was released on August 30, 2023.

== Reception ==
Reception

Aggregate scores
Aggregator	Score
Metacritic	85/100 (Note: Score based on 122 reviews)
OpenCritic	96% recommend (Note: Scored based on 127 reviews)

Review scores
Publication	Score
Destructoid	8.5/10
Electronic Gaming Monthly	4/5
Eurogamer	Recommended
Game Informer	9/10
GameSpot	9/10
GamesRadar+	4.5/5
Giant Bomb	4/5
IGN	9/10
Nintendo Life	8/10
PCMag	4/5
The Guardian	3/5
VG247	4/5

Mario + Rabbids Sparks of Hope received "generally favorable reviews", according to the review aggregator website Metacritic, with many considering it an improvement over Kingdom Battle. Fellow review aggregator OpenCritic assessed that the game was recommended by 96% of critics.

Mario + Rabbids Sparks of Hope sold 17,647 physical copies within its first week of release in Japan, making it the third bestselling retail game of the week in the country. However, according to Ubisoft, the game underperformed in the final weeks of 2022 and early January. As of January 2024, the game had sold nearly 3 million copies.

=== Accolades ===
Year	Award	Category	Result	Ref.
2022	Golden Joystick Awards	Ultimate Game of the Year	Nominated	
2022	Hollywood Music In Media Awards	Score - Video Game	Nominated	
2022	The Game Awards	Best Family Game	Nominated	
2022	The Game Awards	Best Sim/Strategy Game	Won	
2023	New York Game Awards	Central Park Children's Zoo Award for Best Kids Game	Nominated	
2023	26th Annual D.I.C.E. Awards	Family Game of the Year	Won	
2023	Kids' Choice Awards	Favorite Video Game	Nominated	
2023	British Academy Games Awards	Family Game	Nominated	
2023	Ivor Novello Awards	Best Original Video Game Score	Won	
