= Middle-earth: Shadow of Mordor =

2014 video game

- Developer: Monolith Productions (Note: Behaviour Interactive developed the PlayStation 3 and Xbox 360 versions. Aspyr developed the Nintendo Switch 2 version.)
- Publisher: Warner Bros. Interactive Entertainment (Note: Aspyr published the Nintendo Switch 2 version.)
- Producers: Nathan Edson; Zeb Wedell
- Designer: Michael de Plater
- Programmer: Matthew Rice
- Artist: Philip Straub
- Writer: Christian Cantamessa
- Composers: Garry Schyman; Nathan Grigg
- Series: Middle-earth
- Engine: LithTech Jupiter EX
- Platforms: PlayStation 4; Windows; Xbox One; PlayStation 3; Xbox 360; Linux; macOS; Nintendo Switch 2
- Release: September 30, 2014: PlayStation 4, Windows, Xbox One; NA: September 30, 2014; EU: October 3, 2014; AU: October 8, 2014 PlayStation 3, Xbox 360; NA: November 18, 2014; EU: November 21, 2014; AU: November 26, 2014 Linux, macOS; WW: July 30, 2015 Nintendo Switch 2; WW: September 30, 2026
- Genre: Action-adventure
- Mode: Single-player

Middle-earth: Shadow of Mordor is a 2014 action-adventure game developed by Monolith Productions and published by Warner Bros. Interactive Entertainment. An original story based on the legendarium created by J. R. R. Tolkien, the game takes place between the events of The Hobbit and The Lord of the Rings film trilogies. The player controls Talion, a Gondorian Ranger who bonds with the wraith of the Elf Lord Celebrimbor, as the two set out to avenge the deaths of their loved ones. Players can engage in melee combat, and use wraith abilities to fight and manipulate enemies. The game introduces the Nemesis System, which allows the artificial intelligence of non-playable characters to remember their prior interactions with Talion and react accordingly in subsequent encounters.

The game's development began in 2011. In order to create an accurate environment and be consistent with Tolkien's books, the developers consulted Tolkien scholars from Warner Bros, as well as Peter Jackson, director of the film trilogies The Lord of the Rings and The Hobbit. They also received assistance from Wētā Workshop, who advised on the special effects. Christian Cantamessa served as the game's lead writer, while Dan Abnett was recruited to write dialogues for the Orcs featured in the game. Combat in the game was largely influenced by the Batman: Arkham series, while Monolith had previously experimented with the nemesis system in a cancelled Batman game based on Christopher Nolan films. Gameplay of sports games and pen-and-paper role-playing games influenced the design of the nemesis system, which was intended to create personal stories for each player and generate memorable Uruk-hai characters through gameplay.

The game was released for PlayStation 4, Windows, and Xbox One in September 2014. Versions for PlayStation 3 and Xbox 360, developed by Behaviour Interactive, were released in November 2014. A version for Nintendo Switch 2, developed and published by Aspyr, was released on September 30, 2026. Shadow of Mordor received generally favorable reviews upon release. Most praise was directed at its combat, open-world design, and the Nemesis System. Some criticism was aimed at the game's story and boss battles. Shadow of Mordor marked the biggest launch for a game based upon Tolkien's universe, and would go on to win several awards from video gaming publications, including Game of the Year. The game was supported by downloadable content upon release. A sequel, Middle-earth: Shadow of War, was released in October 2017.

== Gameplay ==
In this gameplay screenshot, Talion is using Celebrimbor's wraith-like abilities to defeat an enemy boss.

Middle-earth: Shadow of Mordor is a third-person open world action-adventure video game, where the player controls a ranger by the name of Talion who seeks revenge on the forces of Sauron after his family, consisting of his wife and son, are killed by those that lead them. Players can travel across locations in the game through parkour, riding monsters, or accessing Forge Towers, which serve as fast travel points. Though Talion is mortally felled in the game's introduction, the wraith of the Elven Lord Celebrimbor is able to use his power to keep Talion alive, along with gifting him wraith-like abilities. Missions in the game feature main story missions that follow Talion's quest for revenge, side missions that involve following Gollum to find artifacts that are tied to Celebrimbor's past, missions to free the human slaves that have been captured by the Uruk armies and forced to work for Sauron, and additional quests to help forge new abilities for Talion's sword, bow, and dagger. The player also has the freedom to pursue side quests and roam around Mordor, with special activities to collect specific flora or to hunt certain creatures, or to find old artifacts or Elvish seals.

In completing missions, the player can have Talion engage in melee with freeflow combat, ranged combat, and stealth approaches similar to the Batman: Arkham series, with some missions rewarding the player more for completing the mission in a specific manner. Talion's ranger abilities are enhanced through Celebrimbor, allowing the player to mix combat with special focus-based attacks; these latter attacks can be used to slow time down while aiming with the bow, drain focus out of an enemy foe, or, later in the game, brand the foe to become an ally of Talion. The combat system uses an attack-chain system that enables the player to perform special moves after building the chain to a large enough value, such as instantly draining a foe of focus or performing an area focus attack. With the combat system, they can also counter and dodge attacks. Stealth is a critical element in some missions; several areas are considered Strongholds and should Talion's presence be discovered, an alarm will sound and more Uruks will arrive to try to kill him. Completing quests earns the player a number of rewards: experience points that are used to unlock new abilities for both Talion's ranger and Celebrimbor's wraith skills, a Power value that allows the player to access more powerful abilities to unlock, and an in-game currency called "Mirian" that the player can use to improve Talion's health, wraith skill capacity, or forge new slots on his weapons to add additional runes.

=== Nemesis system ===
A core feature of Shadow of Mordor is the Nemesis system. The game can track any Uruk (a nastier orc, the general antagonists of the game) that the player comes into contact with. While there are "generic" Uruk for the player to fight en masse, and will be as cannon fodder as part of Sauron's armies, the game will begin tracking Uruk that perform any notable talents within the game, such as killing the player or surviving an encounter with the player. These Uruk will be promoted to captains. Defeating these leaders will help to weaken Sauron's army, and these leaders will drop a rune which the player can install on Talion's weapons to provide additional buffs in battle. Alternatively, being killed by a leader will cause the current mission to be cancelled and the player to return to a safe point to continue exploring, and the leader will gain additional power, making him more difficult to defeat in the next encounter. If the procedurally generated Orcs survive an encounter with Talion, they will also be promoted. Further, such deaths are tracked through online servers, and the player's friends on the various network services will be notified of this death and be offered the chance to accept a Vendetta mission and exact revenge on the Uruk. If the mission is successful, the game will give rewards to both the original player and the victorious friend.

The leader Uruk will have a range of strengths and weaknesses, the latter that can be exploited in combat to quickly weaken and defeat the leader. The player can gain knowledge of these through finding intelligence mostly by draining and interrogating specially marked Uruks. Being able to exploit such weaknesses will result in the player acquiring more experience points and better runes. Once the player gains the ability to brand Uruks, they can brand these leaders and convert portions of Sauron's army to their side. At this point, the player can use the Nemesis system to trigger infighting within the Uruk forces which they can then directly participate in, helping to weaken the army further. Uruks that survive their encounter with Talion will remember this when Talion combats them again; for example, an Uruk who was thrown into a fire by Talion might want revenge on him for being disfigured.

==== Adoption issues ====
The "Nemesis System" was patented by Warner Bros. Interactive Entertainment under the US10926179B2 patent and never used in any other game, except for Shadow of War, the game's sequel.

== Synopsis ==
=== Setting ===
Shadow of Mordor is based on Tolkien's Middle-earth legendarium and Peter Jackson's movie franchise. The game takes place in the 60-year gap between the events of Tolkien's The Hobbit and The Lord of the Rings. The family of Talion (voiced and motion captured by Troy Baker), a ranger of Gondor responsible for guarding the Black Gate of Mordor, is killed by the armies of Sauron, but Talion is revived with "wraith-like abilities" and heads into Mordor to exact his revenge. Mordor is not yet a barren wasteland in this story. The player will encounter Gollum (voiced by Liam O'Brien). Talion discovers that the wraith who revived him is Celebrimbor (voiced by Alastair Duncan), the greatest Elven smith master of the Second Age, who also seeks revenge against Sauron.

=== Plot ===
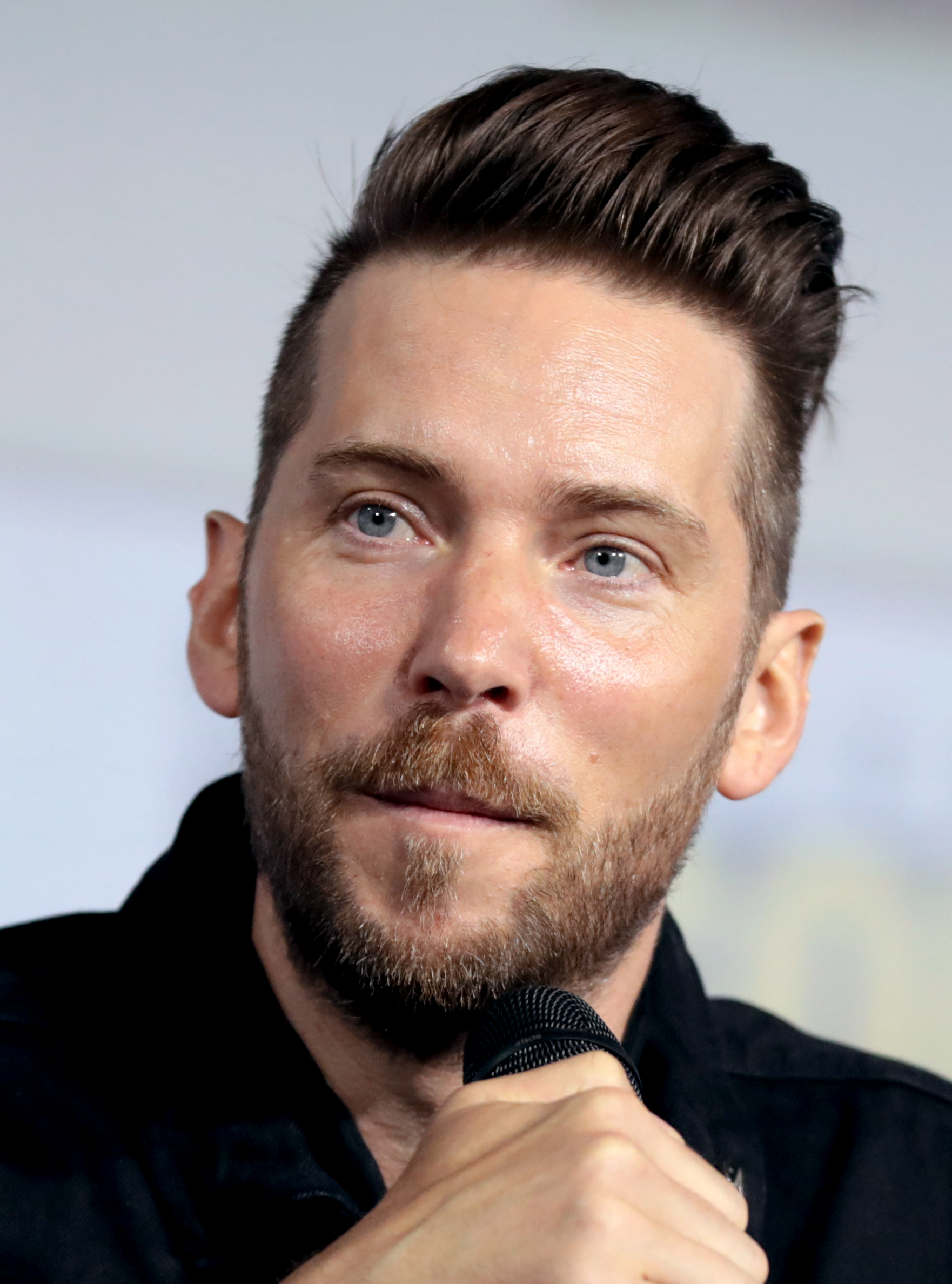
Troy Baker provided the voice for Talion, the game's protagonist.

Talion is a captain of Gondor at the Black Gate of Mordor. His garrison is attacked by Sauron's Uruk forces led by three Black Númenórean captains; the Hammer of Sauron (John DiMaggio), the Tower of Sauron (JB Blanc), and their leader, the Black Hand of Sauron (Nolan North). Talion, his wife Ioreth, and his son, Dirhael, are captured and ritually sacrificed by the Black Hand in an attempt to summon the wraith of the Elf Lord Celebrimbor. However, Celebrimbor (who suffers from amnesia due to his status as a wraith) instead merges with Talion, preventing him from dying alongside his family. Talion and Celebrimbor then depart to uncover Celebrimbor's identity and avenge the death of Talion's family.

Over the course of their travels, Talion and Celebrimbor encounter Gollum multiple times. Gollum possesses the ability to see and speak with Celebrimbor due to his prior contact with the One Ring. Hoping that Celebrimbor might lead him to the One Ring, Gollum leads Celebrimbor to relics of his past, each of which restores parts of his lost memories. Celebrimbor gradually recalls how Sauron, disguised as Annatar, the Lord of Gifts, deceived him into forging the Rings of Power. Celebrimbor ultimately assisted Sauron in forging the One Ring but was able to steal it from him. Celebrimbor proclaimed himself the Bright Lord of Mordor and raised an army of Orcs against Sauron. However, the Ring ultimately betrayed Celebrimbor and returned to Sauron. Sauron then punished Celebrimbor by executing his wife, daughter, and finally, him.

In his search for the Black Hand, Talion allies himself with Hirgon, a ranger deserter who leads a community of Gondorian outcasts choosing to settle in Mordor, and Ratbag the Coward, an Orc who offers to bring Talion closer to the Black Hand in exchange for his assistance in the military hierarchy. Talion helps Ratbag ascend the ranks to the level of warchief by killing each of his immediate superiors, and aids Hirgon in destroying a statue of Sauron. These actions draw out the Hammer of Sauron. After the Hammer decides to execute Ratbag for not killing Talion, Talion confronts and kills the Hammer in combat.

Talion is then sought out by the warrior Lithariel, the daughter of Queen Marwen, who claims to be able to assist Celebrimbor with his mission. Marwen is the ruler of Núrn, a kingdom of sea raiders located in the south of Mordor. She uses prophetic powers to guide Talion and Celebrimbor to another of Celebrimbor's relics. Later, she advises them to use Celebrimbor's powers to take control of an army of Orcs and use them to lead an assault against Sauron. Talion eventually realizes that the wizard Saruman is possessing Marwen, and assists Lithariel in freeing her from his control. Talion, however, still carries out Saruman's plan, leading an army of mind-controlled orcs in an assault against the Black Hand's stronghold at Ered Glamhoth. However, rather than the Black Hand, Talion finds the Tower of Sauron waiting for him. The two battle and Talion emerges victorious after viciously stabbing the Tower to death with his son's sword.

Talion now travels to the Black Gate for a final confrontation with the Black Hand. The Black Hand quickly incapacitates him with a spell that also restores the last of Celebrimbor's memories. He then kills himself as part of a ritual that forces Celebrimbor to depart from Talion and merge with himself. This allows Sauron to possess the Black Hand's body and incarnate in physical form. However, Celebrimbor is able to briefly paralyze Sauron from within, allowing Talion to destroy Sauron's physical form. With the Black Hand dead, Celebrimbor wishes to depart for Valinor. Talion instead convinces him to stay and attempt to overthrow Sauron. Gazing at Mount Doom, Talion declares his intention to forge a new Ring of Power.

== Development ==
Development of Middle-earth: Shadow of Mordor, which took about three years, began in late 2011. The game's lead developer was Monolith Productions, who had experience on a Middle-earth game with Guardians of Middle-earth (a multiplayer online battle arena game released in 2012). According to design director Michael de Plater, Shadow of Mordor was developed in parallel with Guardians of Middle-earth but handled by a separate team. It was published by Warner Bros., who had published the Batman: Arkham game series. The game was designed by de Plater, who had worked with Creative Assembly on Rome: Total War and Ubisoft on Tom Clancy's EndWar and Tom Clancy's Ghost Recon: Future Soldier.

=== Gameplay design ===
Gameplay screenshot of Middle-earth: Shadow of Mordor showcasing the nemesis system

Shadow of Mordor was Monolith's first third-person open-world video game, and de Plater considered its development an educational experience for the studio. In Monolith's introduction to the genre, many core mechanics were built from scratch and the studio were inspired by successful video games such as the Batman: Arkham series created by Rocksteady Studios; those games inspired Shadow of Mordor's stealth and free-flow combat mechanics. The studio considered Rocksteady's games good examples of how to handle a licensed title. In 2019, it was revealed that Monolith had worked on a standalone Batman video game based on the Dark Knight trilogy of films made by Christopher Nolan. The studio had to cancel the project, codenamed Apollo, after one-and-a-half year of development, though elements from that game, such as the nemesis system, were reused in Shadow of Mordor.

The game's signature feature is its Nemesis system. Its origins came from management in WB Games in the early 2010s, seeing that past single-player games like Batman: Arkham Asylum had great initial first sales, but which failed to capture revenue from second-hand sales. WB Games tried other experiments across its studios, such as with downloadable content that could only be activated only once in Batman: Arkham City. For Monolith, their goal was to make a gameplay element that would lead players to keep the game disc within their library rather than seek second-hand sales. The team wanted to create a system which allows non-playable characters to respond to player's actions, creating personal stories for each player and making otherwise nameless Orcs in the game memorable and unique, such that players would not want to part with the game. The system's idea was frameworked three months after development began. It was made more complex during the game's early development, incorporating personal relationships among Orcs, but was later pared down when the studio considered it too complicated. The Nemesis system was also inspired by pen-and-paper role-playing games. Although most Orcs are similar, some were designed with distinctive behavior patterns. These Orcs have dialogue written by Dan Abnett. The team also hoped that the system would provide tension and competition, similar to a multiplayer game. The studio was inspired by sports games, where the narrative continues even when players lose a match. This can prevent immersion and narrative from breaking when the player characters die in the game. The system is designed so players can emotionally attach to the protagonist through gameplay drama, while enabling players to create their own villain, leading to a more organic story.

=== Story and art ===
The game has a standalone plot. Early in development, the team consulted Peter Jackson, director of The Lord of the Rings and The Hobbit film trilogies, who advised them against a film tie-in. To prevent inaccuracies, Monolith consulted several Tolkien scholars from Warner Bros. and collaborated with Wētā Workshop (Jackson's design company) on the game's special effects and scenery. To depict well-known characters the company partnered with Middle-earth Enterprises, the franchise-rights holder, to prevent misuse and contradiction between the game's story and Tolkien's. The game was written by Christian Cantamessa, who was lead writer and lead designer for Red Dead Redemption. According to the team, the story was designed to be accessible for all players regardless of their familiarity with the franchise. Its protagonist is Talion, a half-human, half-wraith inspired by Boromir. Although Torvin was originally proposed as a playable character, the idea was scrapped. The development team picked Celebrimbor as the wraith because they considered his backstory sufficiently interesting to expand the canon's authenticity, allowing the team to write a story around power (a major theme of the game). The team hired David Salo, a linguist who worked on Tolkien's languages for the Lord of the Rings film trilogy, to develop the Orcs' Black Speech. The game's narrative was also inspired by BioShock, which according to de Plater, has successfully incorporated systemic stories with players' choices.

Shadow of Mordor bridges the gap between The Hobbit and The Lord of the Rings, with the team wanting to show iconic elements of the universe in an original way. The team had to draw notes on Tolkien's notes and appendices to ensure that their vision for the game would not change the franchise's timeline. Although the game's environment is inspired by the books and films, several places (such as Udûn and the Sea of Nurnen) were re-imagined. Art director Phil Straub considered consistency with the lore and presenting "something visually new" and realistic the most important elements of creating the game. To depict volcanic activity, the studio sent a team to Eastern Washington and the Columbia River plateau to photograph a volcano; and studied photos of Iceland and New Zealand and yellow stone found worldwide. Since Shadow of Mordor is set before The Lord of the Rings, its landscape is less post-apocalyptic; environments also vary by weather, lighting and atmosphere.

The music for Middle-earth: Shadow of Mordor was composed by Garry Schyman and Nathan Grigg, and a soundtrack album was released digitally by WaterTower Music on September 30, 2014. In designing the game's music, the team used a number of sonic tools which synchronize with other aspects of the game (such as player actions and enemy movements); combat music included waterphones and spring drums.

== Release ==
In August 2013 an artist mentioned that Monolith Productions was working on a AAA title separate from Guardians of Middle-earth. The game was officially unveiled on November 12. Although the game was originally scheduled for release on October 7, 2014, according to Warner Bros. its release was moved up to September 30 in North America and October 3 in the United Kingdom due to "fans' excitement". The PlayStation 3 and Xbox 360 versions were released on November 18 in North America and November 21 in Europe. A version for the Nintendo Switch 2, including all DLC content, is set to release on September 30, 2026. Monolith focused on developing the game's PlayStation 4 and Xbox One versions, with development of the PlayStation 3 and Xbox 360 versions outsourced to Behaviour Interactive. Although the gameplay and story are unchanged in the PlayStation 3 and Xbox 360 ports, some features (such as the Nemesis system) are less complex than the PlayStation 4 and Xbox One versions. According to the game's developer, the Nemesis system was too large for older consoles.

On December 16, 2014, the downloadable content (DLC) Lord of the Hunt was released. Its storyline revolved around Torvin, and it included new runes, skins and bosses. Lord of the Hunt received mixed reviews from critics. The final DLC for Shadow of Mordor, titled The Bright Lord, is set 3,000 years before the main campaign and allows players to control Talion's companion, Celebrimbor. It adds a chapter to Shadow of Mordor in which players can complete ten more missions and fight Sauron. The content was released on February 24, 2015, for PlayStation 4, Windows, and Xbox One. A Game of the Year edition with DLC was announced on April 29, 2015, and released on May 5 for PlayStation 4, Windows, and Xbox One. A special edition, with in-game items and a steelbook, was introduced on August 1.

Shadow of Mordor's online servers were shuttered on January 12, 2021, and a final update for the game removed some features that were tied to this, including the game's Vendetta system and leaderboards. However, in-game achievements tied to these elements were modified to still be achievable or were awarded automatically to players after starting the game following the update.

Warner Bros. patented the Nemesis system with the United States Patent & Trademark Office granting the patent in February 2021.

== Reception ==
=== Critical reception ===
Reception

Aggregate score
Aggregator	Score
Metacritic	XONE: 87/100; PC: 84/100; PS4: 84/100

Review scores
Publication	Score
Destructoid	6/10
Eurogamer	8/10
Game Informer	8.25/10
GameSpot	8/10
GamesRadar+	4.5/5
GameTrailers	8.7/10
Giant Bomb	5/5
IGN	9.3/10
Joystiq	5/5
PC Gamer (US)	85/100
Polygon	9.5/10

Awards
Publication	Award
Game Developers Choice Awards	Game of the Year
GameSpot	Game of the Year
Giant Bomb	Game of the Year
Joystiq	Game of the Year

Middle-earth: Shadow of Mordor received "generally favorable" reviews, according to review aggregator Metacritic.

The Nemesis system was praised by critics. According to Lucas Sullivan of GamesRadar, the system elevated Shadow of Mordor to excellence by making its villains memorable and adding personality to its protagonist. Brad Shoemaker of Giant Bomb wrote that the system created many distinctive characters and its side content extended the game's longevity. Joystiq's Alexander Sliwinski said that the system made each playthrough unique and made the game stand out from other action games. Chris Carter of Destructoid found the system gimmicky, since it failed to create unique villains; it added different appearances and weaknesses to villains without adding personality.

Shadow of Mordor's combat was considered excellent by most critics. Shoemaker and Sliwinski compared it to the rhythm-based combat system of the Batman: Arkham game series; both found it engaging and fluid. Shoemaker praised the game's combat variety; the combination of the combat and nemesis systems created "a specific kind of chaotic, emergent nonsense" desirable in an open world game. According to Sliwinski and Shoemaker, even without the Nemesis system the combat system would make the game compelling. Although Matt Miller of Game Informer found the game's focus on killing made it repetitive, failing to capture the charm of its inspirations Assassin's Creed and Batman: Arkham, Kevin VanOrd of GameSpot called Shadow of Mordor's combat an improvement of the Assassin's Creed formula.

The reception of the game's storyline was mixed. Although Shoemaker and Sliwinski praised its "dark" tone, Shoemaker found some story elements (such as Gollum's introduction) forced and designed to appeal to a particular audience. According to Game Informer's Matt Miller, Shadow of Mordor fails to successfully tie together all of its various plot threads in the game's conclusion. Kevin VanOrd of GameSpot also found the storyline erratic, dragged down by anticlimactic fights and scenes. Dan Stapleton of IGN wrote that the story introduced memorable characters but would not make sense to fans of the series, and his interest in the game waned towards its end. Destructoid's Chris Carter was disappointed in a plot he considered generic ("Go here, kill this, draw out this big bad, then kill him for your family"); the game failed to add anything new to the universe, and its side missions were more interesting than the main campaign.

Other aspects of Shadow of Mordor were praised. Sullivan enjoyed its Lord of the Rings' lore, and found the number of collectables in the game "staggering". Miller also admired Monolith's extensive use of lore in the game, and praised its soundtrack and voice-acting; Elements of the game were criticized. Sullivan found some side missions repetitive, and Sliwinski was disappointed with some of the boss battles. Miller wrote that some Shadow of Mordor features are too complex and inaccessible for new players or those unwilling to use strategy. Critics disagreed about the Nemesis system. Miller wrote that the system fell flat in the game's final hours; according to VanOrd, the system was unappealing until the game's second half. Carter found the unskippable cutscenes after a player died annoying.

Unlike Shadow of Mordor's current-generation versions, the PlayStation 3 and Xbox 360 versions received mixed-to-negative reviews, and many technical problems were noted. According to Thomas Morgan of Eurogamer its frame rate was substandard, and Yannick LeJacq of Kotaku cited "many technical hiccups and glitches". Morgan believed that the game developers spent little effort on the port, and LeJacq questioned the need to release the game for PlayStation 3 and Xbox 360.

Shadow of Mordor was well received by BioShock series creator Ken Levine, who called it the first open-world game with a non-linear story and narrative and said he would bring some of its elements to his upcoming science-fiction project, Judas.

=== Sales ===
Shadow of Mordor's release was the most successful for a Lord of the Rings-based game. The game debuted at number two in the UK retail software sales chart in its first week (behind FIFA 15), and was the ninth-bestselling game in the United States in October 2014.

=== Controversy ===
When Shadow of Mordor was introduced, Monolith was accused by former Ubisoft employee Charles Randall of using assets (such as the protagonist-animation code) from Assassin's Creed II. Monolith responded that all their project's assets were developed from scratch; they had confidence in their originality.

In October 2014, after the usual video game review outlets were unable to obtain early access to Shadow of Mordor, John Bain (known as TotalBiscuit) said that YouTube video creators had been offered early access in exchange for agreeing to a contract requiring them to describe it positively. James Stephanie Sterling of The Escapist obtained a copy of one of the contracts and analyzed it in detail. The Federal Trade Commission began an investigation and announced in July 2016 that Warner Brothers Home Entertainment had violated the Federal Trade Commission Act, and that the company must declare sponsored advertising in the future.

=== Awards ===
In addition to winning several awards at major events and ceremonies, the game was selected by GameSpot, Joystiq, and Giant Bomb as their Game of the Year for 2014.

Year	Award	Category	Result	Ref.
2014	Game Critics Awards Best of E3 2014	Best of Show	Nominated	
2014	Game Critics Awards Best of E3 2014	Best Console Game	Nominated	
2014	Game Critics Awards Best of E3 2014	Best RPG	Nominated	
2014	Best of Gamescom 2014	Best Console Game Sony PlayStation	Nominated	
2014	Best of Gamescom 2014	Best PC Game	Nominated	
2014	The Game Awards 2014	Game of the Year	Nominated	
2014	The Game Awards 2014	Best Performance (Troy Baker as Talion)	Nominated	
2014	The Game Awards 2014	Best Action/Adventure	Won	
2015	17th Game Developers Choice Awards	Game of the Year	Won	
2015	17th Game Developers Choice Awards	Innovation Award	Nominated	
2015	17th Game Developers Choice Awards	Best Design	Nominated	
2015	17th Game Developers Choice Awards	Best Narrative	Nominated	
2015	17th Game Developers Choice Awards	Best Technology	Nominated	
2015	11th British Academy Games Awards	Best Game	Nominated	
2015	11th British Academy Games Awards	Game Design	Won	
2015	11th British Academy Games Awards	Game Innovation	Nominated	
2015	11th British Academy Games Awards	Music	Nominated	
2015	18th Annual D.I.C.E. Awards	Game of the Year	Nominated	
2015	18th Annual D.I.C.E. Awards	Adventure Game of the Year	Won	
2015	18th Annual D.I.C.E. Awards	Outstanding Achievement in Game Direction	Won	
2015	18th Annual D.I.C.E. Awards	Outstanding Achievement in Game Design	Won	
2015	18th Annual D.I.C.E. Awards	Outstanding Achievement in Animation	Won	
2015	18th Annual D.I.C.E. Awards	Outstanding Achievement in Character (Talion)	Won	
2015	18th Annual D.I.C.E. Awards	Outstanding Achievement in Story	Won	
2015	18th Annual D.I.C.E. Awards	Outstanding Innovation in Gaming	Won	
2015	18th Annual D.I.C.E. Awards	Outstanding Technical Achievement	Won	
2015	SXSW Gaming Awards	Game of the Year	Nominated	
2015	SXSW Gaming Awards	Excellence in Technical Achievement	Nominated	
2015	SXSW Gaming Awards	Excellence in Gameplay	Won	
2015	SXSW Gaming Awards	Excellence in Animation	Won	
2015	SXSW Gaming Awards	Excellence in Design and Direction	Won	
2015	2014 NAVGTR awards	Game of the Year	Nominated	
2015	2014 NAVGTR awards	Animation, Technical	Won	
2015	2014 NAVGTR awards	Art Direction, Fantasy	Nominated	
2015	2014 NAVGTR awards	Control Design, 3D	Won	
2015	2014 NAVGTR awards	Direction In A Game Cinema	Nominated	
2015	2014 NAVGTR awards	Lighting/Texture	Nominated	
2015	2014 NAVGTR awards	Performance In A Drama, Supporting (Phil LaMarr as Ratbag)	Won	
2015	2014 NAVGTR awards	Sound Editing In A Game Cinema	Won	
2015	2014 NAVGTR awards	Sound Effects	Nominated	
2015	2014 NAVGTR awards	Game, Franchise Action	Won	
2015	Game Audio Network Guild	Audio of The Year	Nominated	
2015	Game Audio Network Guild	Music of The Year	Nominated	
2015	Game Audio Network Guild	Sound Design of the Year	Nominated	
2015	Game Audio Network Guild	Best Dialog	Nominated	
2015	Game Audio Network Guild	Best Original Instrumental ("Fort Morn")	Nominated	

== Sequel ==
The game's sequel, Middle-earth: Shadow of War, was announced in February 2017. The sequel was developed by Monolith Productions and published by Warner Bros. It was released worldwide on October 10, 2017.
