= Delenda est Carthago (play-by-mail game) =

Play-by-mail role-playing game

- Designers: Judith Proctor
- Publishers: Waveney Games
- Years active: ~1986 to unknown
- Genres: fantasy, Role-playing
- Languages: English
- Players: unlimited
- Playing time: unlimited
- Materials required: Instructions, order sheets, turn results, paper, pencil
- Media type: Play-by-mail or email

Delenda est Carthago is an open-end, mixed-moderated, play-by-mail game. It was designed by Judith Proctor and published by her company, Waveney Games, in the United Kingdom beginning in 1986. By 1992, the game had spread to the United States. The game is set in the fantasy world of Linden in an age approximating earth's medieval age. Players role-play families with wide latitude in actions. The game received multiple positive reviews in gaming magazines in the 1980s and 1990s with reviewer Dirk Dahmann stating that it was ""unquestionably the best PBM game I have ever played". U.S. Flagship editor Bob Bost said that it was "the best role-playing game I have found".

== History and development ==
Delenda est Carthago was created by Judith Proctor. A contributing author to Flagship in the 1980s, she designed and ran this game. The game was mixed-moderated. The gamemaster focused on role-playing, supplementing the computer which handled actions such as movement and combat. Proctor published the game beginning in 1986 through the UK-based Waveney Games. By 1992, U.S. PBM gamers began playing the game, enabled by CompuServe.

== Gameplay ==
The game is set on the continent of Aquila in the fantasy world of Linden which approximated Earth's medieval time period. The game's hex map comprised various terrain types with various possible features such as castles and waterfalls. Players begin with a new or existing family of three characters in one of Aquila's six regions: the Holy Empire, Papal States, Selyas, Kerim, the Kimric Nations, and Elfindas. Each character had skills and traits which guided their actions, the latter including "good/evil, brave/cowardly, trusty/treacherous, generous/miserly, religious/atheist, cautious/reckless, and ... chaste/sex maniac". Various occupations were available, such as artist, clergy, herald, mercenary, nobleman, and philosopher.

The game focused more on roleplaying versus the power aspects of wargaming. But combat was an element of gameplay. Reviewer Dirk Dahmann stated that the game had "one of the most sophisticated combat systems I know of in PBM". Player interaction occurred within gameplay, although it was not possible to differentiate between player and non-player characters.

The game had two major religions. Flaminians (Flame Faith) drew from Christianity and Hiyiros from Islam. The gamemasters provided great latitude in roleplaying. According to reviewer Bob Bost, "there is nothing that can not be attempted. People have performed miracles, been accused of pagan worship and boiled, conquered countries, climbed a castle to give a lady a gift, led a rebellion and attempted to poison a fiancé".

== Reception ==
Dirk Dahmann reviewed the game in a 1988 issue of Flagship, stating that it was "unquestionably the best PBM game I have ever played", highlighting the gamemaster interaction and the detail of the world of Linden. U.S. Flagship editor reviewed the game in a 1992 issue, stating that it "is an excellent game and the best role-playing game I have found ... If you like having open space for creativity and welcome a chance at being kingmaker, this could be the game for you.".

== See also ==
- List of play-by-mail games

== Bibliography ==
- Bost, Bob (May 1992). "Delenda est Carthago: A Yankee at the Shrine of the Flame Faith". Flagship. No. 37. pp. 22–23.
- Dahmann, Dirk (1988). "Delenda est Carthago". Flagship. No. 18. pp. 5–8.
- Athorne, Marion (1988). "Delenda est Carthago". Flagship. No. 19. pp. 10–11.
