= Rayman M =

2001 video game

- European box art
- Developer: Ubi Pictures
- Publisher: Ubi Soft
- Directors: Arnaud Carrette; Riccardo Lenzi
- Producer: Sylvain Constantin
- Designers: Philippe Blanchet; Benoit Macon; Davide Soliani
- Programmer: François Mahieu
- Artist: Jean-Marc Geffroy
- Composer: Claude Samard
- Series: Rayman
- Engine: RenderWare
- Platforms: PlayStation 2 Windows; Xbox; GameCube
- Release: PlayStation 2: FRA: 29 November 2001; EU: 30 November 2001; NA: 24 September 2002; Windows: FRA: 13 December 2001; EU: 14 December 2001; NA: 24 September 2002; Xbox, GameCube: NA: 24 September 2002
- Genres: Party, racing
- Modes: Single-player, multiplayer

Rayman M, known in North America as Rayman Arena, is a party video game developed and published by Ubi Soft. A spin-off of the Rayman series, it features two modes in which players control one of the nine characters.

Rayman M was released in Europe for the PlayStation 2 and Windows and in North America for the GameCube and Xbox. A remake known as Rayman Rush was released for the PlayStation in 2002. Rayman M received mixed reviews from critics, commenting on the game's lack of originality, with Nintendo World Report stating that some have labeled it as a Mario Party-style game. Its remake was criticised for not meeting the original game's quality.

== Gameplay ==
Globox and Rayman in racing mode

Rayman M contains two modes: racing and battle. Both incorporate platform elements from Rayman 2: The Great Escape. In racing mode, there are two playstyles (Five playstyles in the PC and PlayStation 2 versions only), "Obstacle Racing" and time attack. In "Obstacle Racing", the player races a computer player (or other players in multiplayer mode) for three laps while avoiding twelve different obstacles in each level, players can fire Ice balls (PS2 version only) or grab items (GameCube and Xbox versions only) to hinder their opponents for an advantage to keep up with them/leave them behind in the race. In time attack, one of the players must reach at a lap as possible to eliminate others if those players don't make it to that same lap on time, once all the players behind are eliminated, the player in the lead will win, players can still use ice balls to stun their opponents in all versions. The PC and PS2 versions contain training, "Lums" and "Popolopoï", which are all Single player only, "Training" mode is where players can practice on any track to become more advance at the game and quit the level whenever they want. "Lums" mode is where the player must collect all the Lums as they can before winning the race while racing with the computers. "Popolopoï" mode is where the player must quickly finish 3 laps of any track as they can before time runs out, players can shoot at Popolopoïs to earn an extra of 5 seconds (or 10 seconds if they shoot at gold Popolopoïs) of time to the time limit.

Battle mode features 3 playstyles: "Lum Spring"/Freeze Fight", where four players have to collect as many "lums" as they can to win within minutes (or by reaching the maximum point set in the PC and PS2 versions only), while shooting their opponents with Ice balls to freeze them for a few seconds, and "Lum Fight/Total Fight", where players have to fire bullets or any other item at other players to score points within minutes (or by reaching the maximum point set again In the PC and PS2 versions only), players have to deplete all the other players' hearts to score a point while in the GameCube and Xbox versions, players can repeatedly score points every time they shoot at any opponent. "Capture the Fly" (PC and PS2 versions only), is where each of the players must hold possession of a "light-fly" for a few seconds to earn points, other players can fire at that player to detach the fly from them so that they can hold possession of it. The player who gets to the set amount of points first wins.

Players can jump, glide, strafe, fire, and flip. There are twenty-four levels (with several unlockable bonus levels called "Exhibition" mode) in each mode and nine playable characters, including Rayman, Globox, Henchman 800, Razorbeard, Teensies, Tily, Dark Globox (unlockable in the GameCube and Xbox versions only), Henchman 1000 and Razorbeard Wife. In the battle mode, players focused on using items to fire shots at opponents to reduce their heart points, (players will start off with normal shots with unlimited ammo in the GameCube and Xbox versions only) and use shields to protect themselves from other players in "Lum Fight/Total Fight" and in "Lum Spring/Freeze Combat", players focused on firing ice shots to freeze their opponents, while they collect the lums before they do, however once they are out of ice, players will have to wait several seconds for their ice ball meter to refill back up (depending on how many of the ice they shot) before shooting again, while in the GameCube and Xbox versions, they will have an unlimited number of ice balls to shoot, which would also lock-on to opponents whenever they are strafing. Players will also have a radar placed on their screens to help them find the lums.

== Development and release ==
Rayman M was originally separated into two projects: Rayman Tribe and Rayman Shooting Fish, which would turn into the game's modes. Rayman M was announced in April 2001 for the PlayStation 2. Ubi Soft launched an official website for the game, containing a description of the game's characters, modes, and environments, along with galleries of screenshots from each of the game's version. Danny Ruiz, the band manager of Ubi Soft, said that the game "[promised] to provide gamers a new multiplayer experience while maintaining the production value associated with the Rayman franchise." In 2002, the game's producer Sylvain Constantin said that he wanted to do something serious after the game's development which Constantin was asked to lead the driving team and come up with a new idea because he was a driving game enthusiast.

=== Rayman Rush ===
Rayman Rush
- Developer: Ubi Soft Shanghai
- Publisher: Ubi Soft
- Designer: Michel Ancel
- Series: Rayman
- Platform: PlayStation
- Release: EU: 8 March 2002; NA: 26 March 2002
- Genre: Racing
- Modes: Single-player, multiplayer

Rayman Rush is a racing game developed by Ubi Soft Shanghai and published by Ubi Soft. It is a demake of Rayman M for the PlayStation that only features the racing mode. The game had three modes: training mode, where the player can race through levels without opponents or objectives; championship mode, where they race against an opponent; and time attack mode, where they have to finish a level within a set amount of time. Due to the PlayStation's hardware limitations, the game can only support up to two players.

== Reception ==
Reception

Aggregate scores
Aggregator	Score
GameRankings	60.12%
Metacritic	(PS2) 63/100 (PS) 62/100 (GCN) 60/100 (XBOX) 50/100 (PC) 46/100

Review scores
Publication	Score
GameRevolution	5/10
GameSpot	(PC) 5.1/10 (PS) 5.8/10
IGN	4.7/10
Play	3/5

Rayman M received "mixed or average" reviews, according to the review aggregator website Metacritic. Eurogamer writer Tom Bramwell wrote that he best described the game as "a cross country steeplechase dodgeball simulation" and also wrote that the game seems like "a manic, amazingly enterprising adventure game against the clock", describing it as a racing game that would not make sense. Nintendo World Report writer Michael Cole indicates that most video game series seems to be getting a multiplayer spin-off title which omit Rayman M and some have labelled it as a Mario Party-style game in the past however, the writer thought it isn't the solution. Mike Orlando of Nintendo World Report praised the modes for being fun to play with but criticised that the game was not worthy of purchasing. He compared the racing mode to Mad Dash Racing and Running Wild.

Rayman M has also heavily received criticism. GameSpot's Jeff Gerstmann criticising the Windows version of the game's default controls which the player can configure the keyboard and mouse for race and battle games however, the player can also use a game pad which he described as "the most convenient way to play the game" and the most difficult ways to configure. In addition, he praised the GameCube version that the game fits in nicely with games such as Mad Dash Racing, Running Wild, and Sonic R however, the game doesn't differentiate itself from the other games and create anything new. Brady Fiechter of Play criticise that the game should be call "Rayman Racing" and it was "a multiplayer game with nothing but characters from the Rayman universe running through obstacle courses." IGN writer Kaiser Hwang acknowledged that it doesn't live up to its predecessor's legacy, criticised it similar to Mad Dash Racing due to the racing and platforming mix however, it senses of speed is being called out as dull and the level design can be "flat-out horrible." Nebojsa Radakovic for GameRevolution also criticise that it does little to stimulate the kart racing/action game genres, and it tracks play like any kart racing game however, she wrote that it might not be an awful game for a young child.

=== Rayman Rush ===
Rayman Rush received "mixed or average" reviews, according to review aggregator Metacritic. Game Rant's Mark Sammut disappreciated how the game only contains the racing mode along with the game looking far worse and was less responsive than it original game. GameSpot's Ryan Davis was certain that it doesn't maintain the same level of quality as the main games such as unlike the previous games which have top-notch sound design, the music and sound effects in the game feel rushed however, it can prove to be a decent diversion for a short period of time. Martyn Clayden of Games Domain praised the game's vibrantly colourful 3D graphics and the music as cheerful and manages of not becoming too irritating during a long gameplay session.
