= Mario + Rabbids Kingdom Battle =

2017 video game

- Icon artwork, featuring most of the playable characters
- Developers: Ubisoft Milan; Ubisoft Paris (Note: Additional work by Ubisoft Montpellier)
- Publisher: Ubisoft
- Director: Davide Soliani
- Producers: Xavier Manzanares; Gian Marco Zanna
- Designers: Damiano Moro; Julien Vial
- Programmers: Sylvain Glaize; Tiziano Sardone
- Artists: Mauro Perini; Fabrizio Stibiel
- Writers: Andrea Babich; Edward Kuehnel
- Composer: Grant Kirkhope
- Series: Mario; Rabbids; Mario + Rabbids
- Engine: Snowdrop
- Platform: Nintendo Switch
- Release: 29 August 2017
- Genres: Tactical role-playing, action-adventure
- Modes: Single-player, multiplayer

Mario + Rabbids Kingdom Battle (Note: Japanese: マリオ+ラビッツ キングダムバトル, Hepburn: Mario + rabittsu kingudamubatoru) (Note: French: Mario + The Lapins Crétins: Kingdom Battle) is a 2017 action-adventure and tactical role-playing game developed by Ubisoft Milan and Ubisoft Paris and published by Ubisoft for the Nintendo Switch. A crossover between Nintendo's Mario and Ubisoft's Rabbids franchises, it follows Mario, his friends and the Rabbids, who must save the Mushroom Kingdom from the latter's invading brethren following their mishandling of an avid Mario fan's powerful invention in their world.

Mario + Rabbids Kingdom Battle was conceived in 2014 by Ubisoft Milan creative director Davide Soliani and Ubisoft brand producer Xavier Manzanares. The design objectives emphasized the dissonance of both franchises and creating a strategy game that stood out with unique elements. Its visual elements and animation were casual and vibrant and its music was composed by Grant Kirkhope. Although the game was met with poor reception when it was leaked, primarily due to its use of elements from the Rabbids franchise and weaponry, it was well received when it was officially announced at E3 2017.

The game's critical reception was overall positive, with praise towards its characters and turn-based combat and mixed responses to its puzzles and level-based combat. In 2018, a Donkey Kong-centric expansion pack for the game was released as downloadable content. A sequel, titled Mario + Rabbids Sparks of Hope, was released on 20 October 2022.

== Gameplay ==
Mario attacking an enemy Rabbid from behind cover

Gameplay follows Mario and a cast of other Mario and Rabbids characters of the player's choosing, including Luigi, Princess Peach, Yoshi and a quartet of Rabbids akin to the aforementioned Mario characters with exaggerated personalities. They are guided by a small robot named Beep-0. The campaign story mode is split up into four unique locations, or "worlds", each of which has a linear path to completion. In each world, some puzzles must be completed for progression, or give weapons and collectibles when solved. When a world is completed, Beep-0 learns a new ability to solve puzzles. Two unique weapons can be unlocked by connecting the console to any one of several Amiibo figurines.

If the team comes across territory inhabited by enemy Rabbids, a battle will commence. While the goal of each battle is usually to defeat every enemy on the field, some levels have a fixed objective, such as escorting a Toad to the end of the stage. The level is completed if all enemies are defeated or the fixed objective is satisfied; the player loses when all characters run out of health or fail to meet their goal. Before a battle, the player can choose to change their current selection of characters and weaponry; three out of eight playable characters can fight in a battle (Mario and at least one Rabbid being required), and each fighter can be equipped with weapons, each one dealing different amounts of damage or causing certain special effects that hinder the opponent. Battles are turn-based, and each character can perform up to three different options: they can move to a new location, with each character having a set distance they can travel; they can use a weapon, and have two choices of attack that vary per player; or they can use a special effect, with each character having different abilities that vary in function. If a player moves to a location where they are obscured to the enemy, the enemy's accuracy changes based on the cover's effectiveness. Characters also have movement abilities, where they can dash into an enemy to deal damage or be boosted by another character to travel a further distance. Some weapons have special effects; for example, the player can shoot a glob of honey at the enemy to restrict them from moving temporarily, or shoot an ignited bullet to burn an opponent and send them running around in a random direction in panic. Special effects also vary, such as a healing effect that restores some health to other characters, or a hypnosis effect that draws enemies towards the character that used it.

Levels are divided into chapters and each one usually contains three levels. When a chapter is completed, characters receive coins and "Skill Orbs", which can also be found by exploring the overworld, with greater rewards earned clearing battles within a certain number of turns with all characters intact. Skill Orbs can be used in each character's skill tree to grant them new abilities or increase stats such as health or movement distance. Coins can be used to purchase new weaponry and items.

== Plot ==
=== Kingdom Battle ===
A young inventor and avid fan of the Mario franchise has invented the SupaMerge, a headset-like device that can merge any pair of objects into a single entity, with the help of her virtual robot assistant Beep-0; however, the device has an overheating problem that the inventor is trying to nullify. Upon testing it, it successfully merges two items, but overheats again. While the inventor is out of the room, the Rabbids suddenly arrive in their Time Washing Machine and they begin to mischievously play with her belongings, to Beep-0's annoyance. One of them dons the SupaMerge and starts merging some of its fellow Rabbids with various items in the room. During this, the Time Washing Machine is then afflicted by the device and it malfunctions, sucking everything in the room into an interdimensional vortex.

An anomaly in spacetime appears above the Mushroom Kingdom during the unveiling of a statue of Princess Peach and sucks everyone into it, including Mario and his allies. They and the Rabbids are thrown across the kingdom along with the now-enlarged objects from the room. Beep-0, now a physical entity with Rabbid-like attributes and an ability to speak, discovers that the SupaMerge has become part of the Rabbid wearing it, who uncontrollably transfigures more of its brethren. Beep-0 is nearly hit by the now-enlarged Time Washing Machine, but Mario saves him as it crash-lands near Peach's castle. While the recently transfigured Rabbids are hostile due to the SupaMerge's power now becoming corrupted upon entering the Mario universe, a quartet of some of them akin to Mario and company are not. Aided by a mysterious email contact known only as F.B., who provides them with weapons, abilities and advice, the two groups join forces to put a stop to the chaos.

As the heroes travel across the Mushroom Kingdom while defeating and rehabilitating the corrupted Rabbids, Bowser Jr. comes across the one fused to the SupaMerge, which he dubs Spawny, and tries to use him in worsening the crisis to earn praise from his father, who is currently on vacation. Resolving to recover Spawny so they can put an end to the crisis, the heroes eventually learn that the anomaly presumably created by the SupaMerge and referred to as the "Megabug" is growing more powerful as they rehabilitate more of the corrupted Rabbids. They eventually recover Spawny from Bowser Jr., only for him to be abducted by the Megabug, which has now assumed a physical form, and becomes part of it, empowering the Megabug with the SupaMerge's abilities. It continues to create more corrupted Rabbids and later possesses Bowser, who had just returned from his vacation, to combat the heroes, who then vanquish the fiend, saving both him and Spawny. As peace returns to the Mushroom Kingdom, the heroes celebrate their victory by replacing the statue of Princess Peach that had been destroyed when the crisis began with one of the Peach-like Rabbid. In an epilogue, Beep-0 realizes that F.B. is his future self, Future Beep-0, and uses the Time Washing Machine to help his comrades in the past by sending the same emails, weapons and abilities that were sent to his past self.

=== Donkey Kong Adventure ===
During the events of the main campaign, Rabbid Kong, a Donkey Kong-like Rabbid who served as its first major boss encounter, fiddles with the Time Washing Machine in the battle's aftermath, causing him, Rabbid Peach and Beep-0 to be transported to the Donkey Kong-centric portion of the Mario universe after getting close to the machine when Rabbid Peach decides to charge her cell phone using it. The event is witnessed by Bowser Jr. and Spawny, with the latter unintentionally afflicting the Time Washing Machine once more before it teleports, causing the machine's water and the Rabbids who get sucked in it to be corrupted. They are marooned on Donkey Kong Island and the machine is severely damaged. To return to the Mushroom Kingdom, Rabbid Peach and Beep-0 must find the machine's missing parts and repair it. About to be assaulted by some of the corrupted Rabbids, the duo are saved by Donkey Kong and a Cranky Kong-like Rabbid, who had both been transported to the island during the game's prologue and agree to help. Elsewhere, Rabbid Kong ends up becoming corrupted by a "Bad Banana", a banana contaminated with the Megabug's energy oozing from the Time Washing Machine's water due to Spawny's unintentional affliction of it, and becomes more powerful. Seeking revenge against Rabbid Peach for his previous defeat, he starts a banana racketeering operation on the island to create more Bad Bananas as he takes over. The heroes fights against Rabbid Kong's forces of native versions of the enemies fought in the main campaign, disposing of all the Bad Bananas they can find and defeating a pair of powerful corrupted Rabbids working for Rabbid Kong to obtain the keys to his lair. Shortly after arriving, they defeat Rabbid Kong in a pair of final battles, the first one in his lair, which is then destroyed when the corrupted water explodes, and then again when they chase him to the coast, depriving him of his power and undoing the effects of the Megabug's influence on the island. In the aftermath, Rabbid Peach and Kong make amends and the latter helps them repair the Time Washing Machine, sending it, Rabbid Peach and Beep-0 back to the Mushroom Kingdom. In a post-credits scene, the inventor from the prologue returns and discovers Rabbid Peach's photos of the island, which somehow ended up in her room.

== Development and release ==
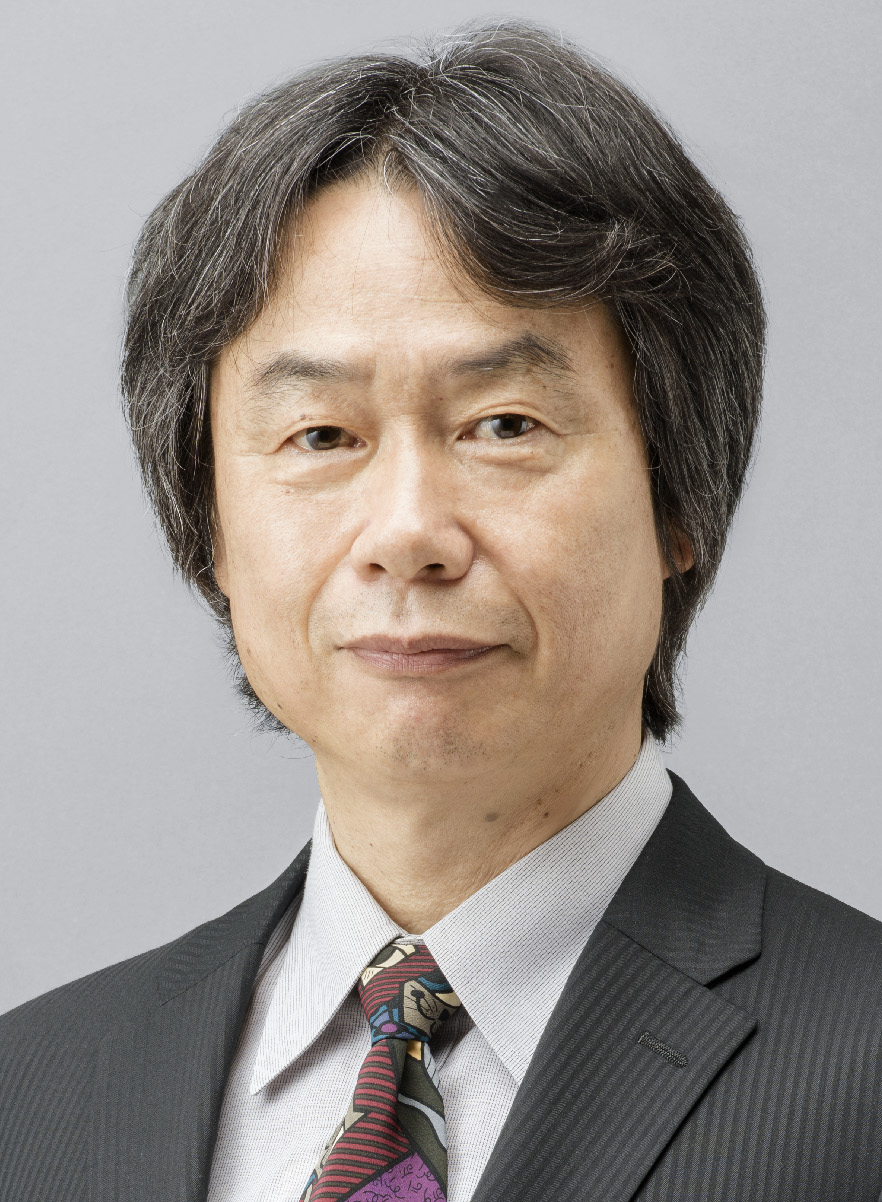
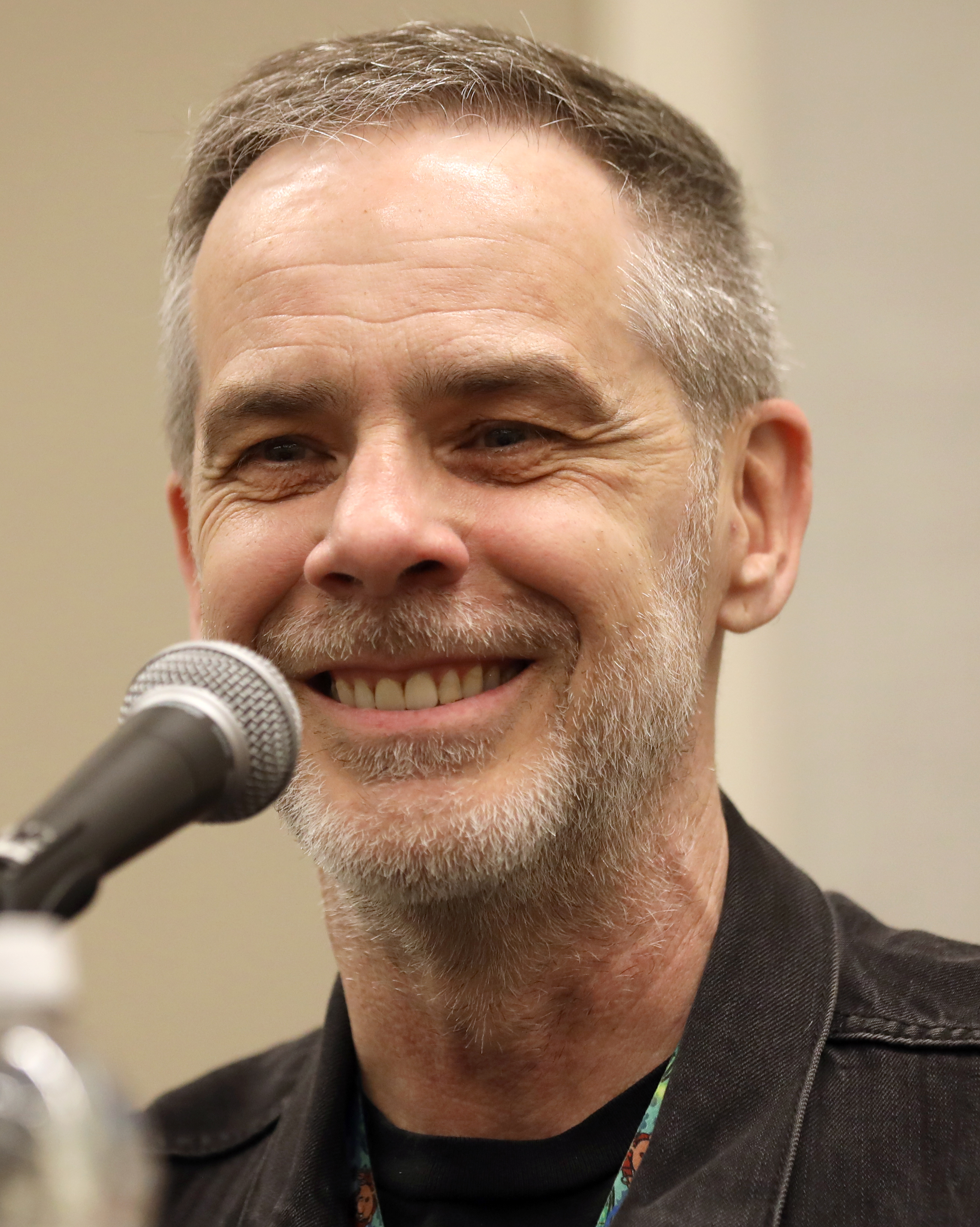
Davide Soliani, the game's creative director, was a big fan of Mario creator Shigeru Miyamoto (left) and composer Grant Kirkhope (right) and was ecstatic to work with them.

As a child, the game's Italian creative director Davide Soliani had always enjoyed playing Mario games. Soliani had met Shigeru Miyamoto, creator of the Mario franchise a handful of times in the past; on one occasion, when Soliani first met Miyamoto at E3 2014, he asked him to sign a copy of a Game Boy Advance remake of Disney's The Jungle Book, which Soliani developed in 2003.

After a long run of Rabbids video games developed by Ubisoft meanwhile, Xavier Manzanares, a Ubisoft brand producer, thought about the future of the Rabbids series in 2013. Ubisoft began to talk with Nintendo about ideas for future Rabbids video games, but only really brought the concept of party games like the ones they made prior.

Toward the end of the year, Manzanares began to conceptualize games that were not the typical genre they were familiar with. He teamed up with three others to plan a game, including Soliani, who later became the creative director of Kingdom Battle. Without any clear idea, their main goal was to combine the Rabbids and Mario franchises. When Soliani presented thirteen ideas to Manzanares, he abandoned the focus on combining the brands and shifted attention towards the game itself. Because the two franchises were very different from each other, they decided on the turn-based strategy genre because neither franchise had done anything in the field. Manzanares's ultimate goal was to design something surprising, even for Nintendo.

According to Soliani, when presenting the idea to Miyamoto, the team worked hard on a prototype for presentation. They refrained from simply a discussion or visuals and concepts because Soliani "really wanted to show stuff instead of just talking". Miyamoto's major concern was giving Mario characters weapons, but he thought that Ubisoft "understands Mario as a character" and put trust in the company when details were fleshed out. The development team was equally apprehensive about featuring firearms in a Mario game; to alleviate this, they took inspiration from films with exaggerated weaponry such as The Fifth Element, which featured plasma-firing arm cannons. Nintendo permitted to let Mario characters use the guns. Early development of the game was tricky for Ubisoft, as they had to juggle using a new game engine, Snowdrop, and a genre and concept they had not officially defined. On multiple occasions, Nintendo directly asked Ubisoft to put more emphasis on the weirdness of the Rabbids; Miyamoto found the characters to be a unique source of humor unexplored in the Mario franchise. Nintendo's ultimate goal was to be surprised in what ways the Rabbids could bring gameplay elements that were not typical in regular Mario games, so they repeatedly asked Ubisoft to surprise them.

=== Design ===
Nintendo was always keen on ensuring their games were innovative and stood out. Knowing this, Ubisoft began production by brainstorming unique ideas to set it apart from other strategy games. Considering that many games of the genre were dull in color and slower-paced to emphasize strategy, Ubisoft conceptualized a colorful and fast-paced game, and the company used Nintendo's Mario Kart series as its main point of reference. The action was focused on moving around the battlefield instead of hiding for cover often, said Soliani. To make sure they balanced casual gameplay with the strategy genre, Ubisoft extensively playtested. They made sure the game was accessible and taught the player throughout their playtime. When it came to the level of difficulty, Soliani was surprised to see nine-year-old children pulling off stunts he believed would not work with a younger audience.

An underlying goal of Ubisoft was to combine the two franchises to equally represent both. To emphasize a crossover, the company put effort into contrasting the two. Nintendo wanted a game that was built around the intellectual property (IP) of the Mario universe, while also emphasizing the anarchy of the Rabbids, which Nintendo set as a goal from the beginning. For example, Ubisoft wanted Rabbid Peach to not simply be a Rabbid in a Princess Peach costume, but rather to give her a personality that was similar in some ways yet stereotypically contrasting the original character. Rabbid Peach was in the base prototype and Nintendo found it to be a funny concept. While Nintendo gave Ubisoft a lot of open freedom, they made sure that they stayed faithful to the IP. Ubisoft received multiple notes about changes in the animation and looks in the Mario characters; in total, there were about 1,500 animations to fit.

=== Music ===
"It struck me... how on earth was I going to write music for Mario after Koji Kondo, who is the greatest games composer in the world? I thought this is impossible. I can't possibly write music for this game. I'm just not good enough."

— Composer Grant Kirkhope, 2017 GamesIndustry.biz interview

For the game's music, Soliani contracted Grant Kirkhope, a composer who had written the music for numerous critically-acclaimed games such as Banjo-Kazooie and Donkey Kong 64. Like Miyamoto, Soliani was a big fan of his works as he grew up with a Nintendo 64, which contained multiple games with music by him.

Kirkhope received an email from Gian Marco, a producer at Ubisoft, in late 2014. It simply mentioned a game he could be interested in composing music for, so he signed a non-disclosure agreement and met with Soliani in Paris, France. Kirkhope believed he was simply working on a new Rabbids video game, as the tentative title at the time was Rabbids Kingdom Battle. He was confused about why a Rabbids game was being kept secret, and when he discovered the game was a crossover with the Mario franchise, he was left in shock; Soliani was worried that Kirkhope was disinterested. Eventually, he agreed to work on the game and built a strong connection with Soliani. It was difficult for Soliani to work with Kirkhope at first due to him having to give feedback to someone he admired. One of Kirkhope's biggest challenges was the quantity: he had to compose in total approximately 2.5 hours of music. Additionally, he and Soliani were located in Los Angeles and Milan, respectively; Kirkhope would sometimes accidentally call Soliani in the middle of the night asking for feedback.

=== Release, promotion, and additional content ===
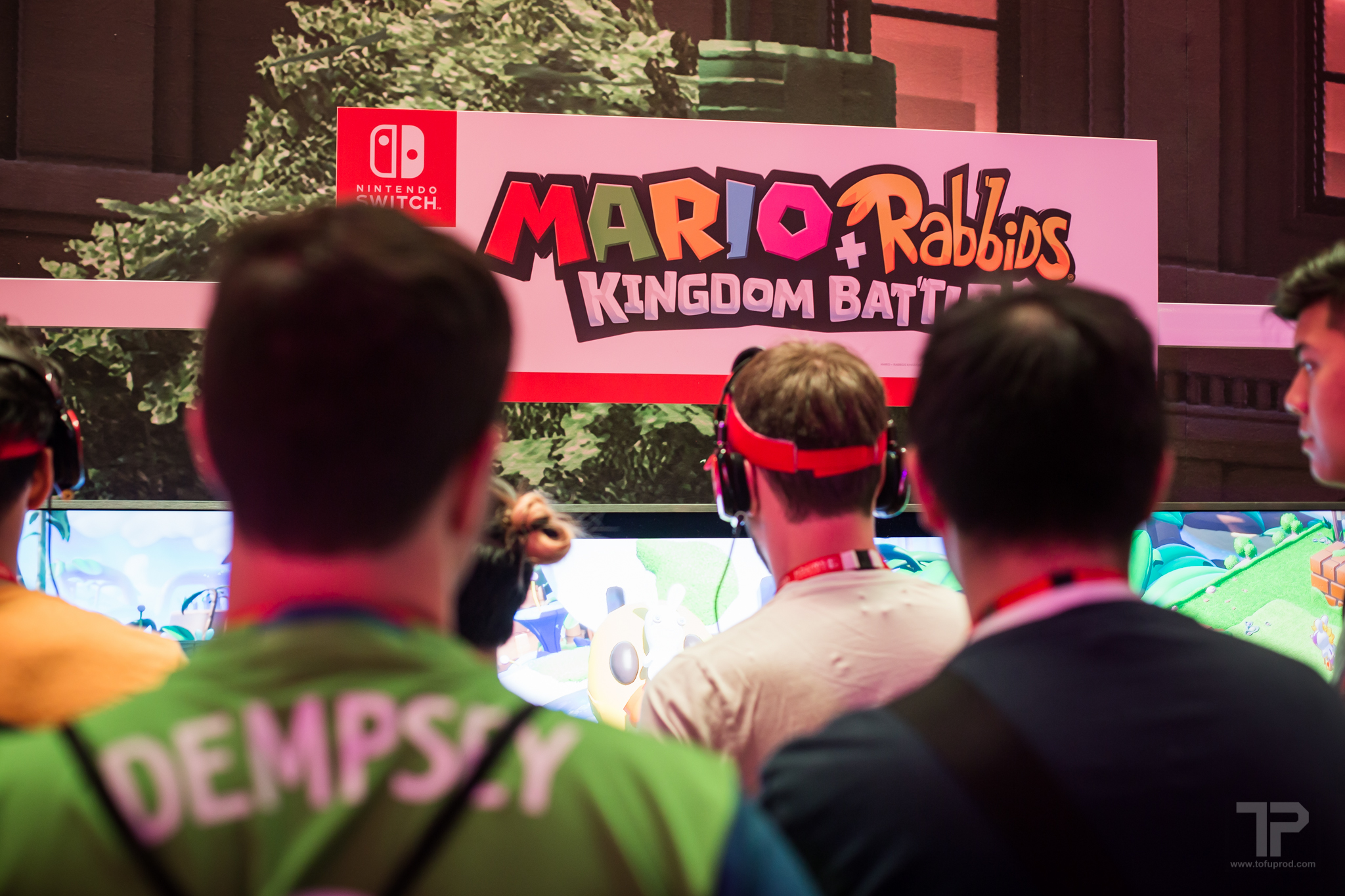
Promotion of Kingdom Battle at E3 2017

Information on a crossover between the Mario and Raving Rabbids franchises was leaked as early as November 2016, although the title Mario + Rabbids Kingdom Battle was first leaked in May 2017, before its official announcement during Ubisoft's press conference at E3 2017. Four figurines replicating characters from the game were announced in June. The game was released in North America and PAL territories for the Nintendo Switch on 29 August 2017. It was later released in Japan and other East Asian territories on 18 January 2018, where Nintendo published and distributed the title for Ubisoft. A collector's edition was released, which came with a soundtrack CD, cards, and an exclusive Rabbid Mario figurine. Ubisoft released post-launch downloadable content (DLC) through a season pass, which includes new weapons, solo challenges, cooperative maps, and story-based content. On 26 June 2018, an expansion known as Donkey Kong Adventure was released, which features a new story featuring Rabbid Peach and Beep-0 teaming up with Donkey Kong and Rabbid Cranky to defeat Rabbid Kong, one of the bosses in the game's main storyline.

"Two weeks after E3, when I came back to the office, we found a new team. It gave us wings. Player reaction and support is an incredible energizer for the team."

— Creative director Davide Soliani, 2017 Game Informer interview

Kingdom Battle was intended to be revealed at E3 2017, but some info was accidentally leaked before then. An image of Mario and Rabbid Peach posing with weapons was leaked. When the concept was met with negative reception, the development team became discouraged and lost morale, which caused Soliani to emphasize a unique experience because of it. Soliani was in a constant state of panic before its full reveal and urged his development team to not get their hopes up. When major details about the game were revealed at E3 2017, Miyamoto came and helped Soliani pitch the game to the audience. Upon seeing the game in full, fans showed curiosity and excitement in it. When Soliani saw the praise, he teared up on stage with excitement and relief, and his reaction became an internet meme. After the conference, Soliani received 37 awards for the performance. When he returned to work, the company's morale was greatly boosted.

Ubisoft began to work on the Donkey Kong Adventure DLC shortly after the game's reveal at E3 2017. According to Soliani, the initial plan was to release about 1–2 hours of additional content. After the praise of the game after its reveal, Soliani decided to add as much content as possible, with cutscenes, worlds, and gameplay totaling about half of the base game. After the rework, the DLC was 10 hours in length. Kirkhope wrote an additional 45 minutes of music and the programmers completely redid the gameplay as Soliani wanted the new content to be completely offset from the original game.

To advertise the game, the Ubisoft Instagram account was temporarily changed to appear as if it were Rabbid Peach's personal account, with posts and images being made as if they were coming from her perspective. Critics responded positively to the account, though Gita Jackson of Kotaku criticized it, finding the concept to be "creepy" and to be critical of woman on Instagram.

== Reception ==
=== Critical reviews ===
Reception

Aggregate scores
Aggregator	Score
Metacritic	85/100
OpenCritic	92% recommend 79% recommend(DLC)

Review scores
Publication	Score
Destructoid	7.5/10
Electronic Gaming Monthly	8.5/10
Game Informer	8.5/10
GameSpot	9/10
GamesRadar+	4/5
Giant Bomb	3/5
IGN	7.7/10
Nintendo Life	9/10
Nintendo World Report	9/10
PCMag	4/5
Polygon	8/10

Mario + Rabbids Kingdom Battle received "generally favorable" reviews according to review aggregator website Metacritic. Fellow review aggregator OpenCritic assessed that the game received "mighty" approval, being recommended by 92% of critics. The game debuted at number two on the UK physical video game sales charts. It was the best-selling physical video game in Australia in the week ending 3 September. It sold 66,692 copies within its first week on sale in Japan, which placed it at number one on the all-format sales chart. By September 2017, Mario + Rabbids Kingdom Battle became the best-selling game on the Nintendo Switch to have not been wholly published by Nintendo. In June 2021 Ubisoft announced in a press release that the game had been played by 7.5 million players.

Most critical reviews opened by reaffirming the ludicrousness of the game's concept; Giant Bomb considered the idea a "bad, late-night message board conversation", and most critics had mixed opinions of the Rabbids franchise as a whole, especially in comparison to the Mario franchise. When the game was released, reviewers were quick to reconsider how in-depth the game was, despite their preconceived notions that the game would be gimmicky or reliant on Rabbids-style humor. Some believed that the game's tone and writing mixed well with the Mario franchise; Wired's Julie Muncy observed that Mario often acts as a straight man to the Rabbids' childish behavior.

The cast of new characters introduced in Kingdom Battle received a generally positive response. Rabbid Peach in particular emerged as a popular character with critics and players following an initially divisive reception before the game's release. Chris Bratt from Eurogamer found that the game's characters are an effective representation of its setting and humor; he singled out Rabbid Peach as having given him an initially crass impression from the game's leak, but grew to enjoy her antics when more of the game was shown, a sentiment fellow Eurogamer contributor Jeffrey Matulef shared. Gabe Gurwin of Digital Trends regarded her as the standout of Kingdom Battle's cast, praising her for her humor and entertaining personality and suggesting that she should appear in the crossover video game series Super Smash Bros. Paul Tamburro of GameRevolution stated that she "steals the show" in Kingdom Battles, crediting her with giving the Rabbids mascot a personality. Critics were divided over Ubisoft's decision to center the game's promotional efforts on social media around Rabbid Peach; Kotaku's Gita Jackson found the change creepy due to its attempts to personify brands, and felt that the account mocked women on Instagram. Despite this, she still found the character cute. Writer Laura Kate Dale was more positive and commented that Rabbid Peach "stole the show" in Kingdom Battle, particularly citing her love for taking selfies on her mobile phone as a contributing factor.

The game's simplified combat system and structure were revered throughout reviews. Polygon reviewer Russ Frushstick commented that although the game wasn't too bold in appealing to older audiences, it successfully made the tactical roleplaying genre appealing to unfamiliar audiences with its simplistic approach. PCMag considered this to be due to the lack of complex statistics and probability, and rather favored simplistic "coin-flip" chances. The Verge also praised its simplicity, and claimed that it blended well with the Nintendo Switch and its portable functionality due to the structured format. Various sites positively compared gameplay to the XCOM franchise.

Puzzles in between the level-based combat received mixed opinions in comparison. Writing for Destructoid, Chris Carter found the space in between levels to be filler rather than a unique exploration feature, only used to hide collectible items. In addition, Jeff Marchiafava of Game Informer found certain collectibles, such as music and concept art, to be lackluster and not worth going out of the way to achieve, although the combat phases more than made up for it. Conversely, GameSpot enjoyed how it helped interconnect the environment to make it "seamless", and although some puzzles could be tedious it helped give a brief distraction once in a while.

=== Accolades ===
Kingdom Battle received numerous awards, generally in strategy game categories alongside several other nominations. The game won "Best Strategy Game" at the Game Critics Awards, Gamescom, and The Game Awards 2017, as well as "Strategy/Simulation Game of the Year" at the 21st Annual D.I.C.E. Awards. Additionally, the game won "Best Original Game" at the Game Critics Awards, as well as the "Animation" and "Visual Design" categories at the 2018 Develop Awards. It was also nominated for several other miscellaneous categories, such as best casual game, best family game, and best of show; the game was surpassed only by other first-party games developed solely by Nintendo, being under shadowed by Super Mario Odyssey and The Legend of Zelda: Breath of the Wild.

Eurogamer ranked the game fifth on their list of the "Top 50 Games of 2017"; GamesRadar+ ranked it 13th on their list of the 25 best games of 2017; EGMNow ranked it 14th on their list of the 25 Best Games of 2017; Polygon ranked it 33rd on their list of the 50 best games of 2017. The game won the award for "Best Strategy Game" in IGN's Best of 2017 Awards, whereas its other nominations were for "Best Switch Game" and "Best Original Music".

Year	Award	Category	Result	Ref(s).
2017	Game Critics Awards	Best of Show	Nominated	
2017	Game Critics Awards	Best Original Game	Won	
2017	Game Critics Awards	Best Console Game	Nominated	
2017	Game Critics Awards	Best Strategy Game	Won	
2017	Gamescom	Best Console Game (Nintendo Switch)	Nominated	
2017	Gamescom	Best Strategy Game	Won	
2017	Gamescom	Best Casual Game	Nominated	
2017	Golden Joystick Awards	Nintendo Game of the Year	Nominated	
2017	The Game Awards 2017	Best Family Game	Nominated	
2017	The Game Awards 2017	Best Strategy Game	Won	
2018	21st Annual D.I.C.E. Awards	Strategy/Simulation Game of the Year	Won	
2018	14th British Academy Games Awards	Family	Nominated	
2018	British Academy Children's Awards	Game	Won	
2018	Develop Awards	Animation	Won	
2018	Develop Awards	Visual Design	Won	

== Legacy ==
In the 2018 fighting game Super Smash Bros. Ultimate, three of the Rabbids appear as collectable power-ups ("Spirits"): Rabbid Mario, Rabbid Peach, and Rabbid Kong. Rabbid Peach appears in Just Dance 2018 as the alternative playable mascot for Beyoncé's song "Naughty Girl".

Connections forged from Kingdom Battle extend beyond Rabbids references. In January 2019, Kirkhope was asked by Soliani for his contact information on behalf of Nintendo, saying the company loved what Kirkhope had done for the Mario + Rabbids soundtrack and requested his help on an unspecified piece of music. Kirkhope was initially skeptical about the purpose of this offer but accepted it. Upon realizing that he was being asked to arrange music for Banjo and Kazooie's appearance in Super Smash Bros. Ultimate, he was excited for the return of the characters.

== Sequel ==
A sequel, Mario + Rabbids Sparks of Hope, was announced at E3 2021 and was released on 20 October 2022 on the Nintendo Switch.

== See also ==
- Rabbids
- Rayman
