= Midgard (play-by-mail game) =

Medieval fantasy play-by-mail wargame

- Title image
- Publishers: Time Space Simulations, Talisman Games
- Publication: 1984; 42 years ago
- Genres: medieval fantasy, play-by-mail
- Languages: English
- Players: unlimited
- Playing time: open ended
- Materials required: Instructions, order sheets, turn results, paper, pencil
- Media type: Play-by-mail or email
- Website: https://knightguild.com/

Midgard is an open-ended, medieval fantasy play-by-mail game. It was published in 1984 by Time Space Simulations. Through 1996, the game passed through more than four different publishers, including Midgard USA. As of 2022, Talisman Games is the publisher. At initial publication, Midgard was computer moderated with partial human moderation.

The game's context is medieval Europe. Gameplay occurs on a continent about the size of Greenland. The game's purpose is to achieve high status in the feudal system. Players begin the game with a few loyal friends, some retainers, and some resources and pursue tasks to gain Influence Points in order to rise in the ranks of the player's chosen affiliate or group. Economic and combat systems are well developed and detailed. The game was reviewed multiple times in the 1980s and 1990s, receiving generally positive marks for gameplay with negatives for a gamemaster of the period. Midgard scored #9 on the Best Play By Mail Game of 1987 list in Paper Mayhem Magazine.

== Development ==
Midgard was published in 1984. The game's developer was Mark Stiffler. In 1986, Stiffler and his wife Talla as well as additional gamemasters ran Midgard under the publishing company Time Space Simulations. Reviewer Charles Day noted that in 1986, the gamemasters processed each turn with "a personal touch", indicating human moderation.

As of 1987, the publisher stated the game had more than 900 tribes, with the potential for about 300–400 players. Turn results in the 1980s included carbon paper to allow players to handwrite turn orders to send to the gamemaster while keeping a copy. As of 1987, the publisher used a MacIntosh computer running FileMaker Pro database for tracking some data while the gamemasters handled special actions. Prior to 1996, Midgard had changed hands to four or more publishers. According to reviewer John Rayment, Stiffler passed the game on to other gamemasters who were unable to adequately manage it. Eventually, Delta Games gave Midgard a major update.

In 1996, the game was run by Midguard USA and was "computer moderated with three hand moderated special actions per turn".

== Gameplay ==
The game's context is medieval Europe after a period of conflict. Players have 18 available provinces which are further divided into smaller regions and hexes for a playing area about the size of Greenland. The Midgard continent has more than 250 cities. Players begin the game with a few loyal friends, some money, and about 200 retainers. An enjoyable aspect of gameplay is management of the retainers which could be controlled with 43 different orders. Progress in the game is made by accepting and accomplishing tasks (e.g., road construction, rescue, or reconnaissance) for rewards. Players can choose diverse styles of play including combative, capitalistic, and religious.

If you are looking for an open ended game with lots of color, sufficient but not overwhelming detail, power politics, and GM's that are dedicated to using state-of-the-art techniques, you'll find years of entertainment roaming the world of Midgard.

— Stephen Marte. "Midgard"

Turn results are detailed and comprehensive. Results average between 8 and 10 printed pages per turn. The game has well-developed and detailed economic and combat systems. The combat system can accommodate battles in size from 200 to over 200,000 troops. Reviewer Nicky Palmer stated that battle reports were extremely detailed. A gamemaster during the playtest provided a battle report for a siege with four pages of maps and eight pages of text. (Note: Palmer stated that the gamemaster-prepared battle reports combined computer-generated graphics (from a Macintosh) and human-generated text, which took the gamemaster several hours for each major battle.)

The purpose of Midgard is to achieve high status in the feudal system. Players can choose from multiple affiliations—or groups—at the start of the game, including families, religions, guilds, and even bandits or pirates. Players rise in their affiliation by gaining Influence Points, with those achieving the most points in a group becoming the Senior Player who has additional authority and resources. Alliances and cross-faction missions and tasks are also possible.

Midgard is an open-ended game. However, players at the pinnacle of their factions who reach a secret point total are promoted out of the game. Players who do this five times receive the title of Grand Master.

== Reception and legacy ==
Nicky Palmer reviewed the game in the Spring 1985 issue of Flagship. He concluded that "the game requires a fairly high degree of player commitment, but offers an exciting life as you lead your gallant band through the vicious cross-currents of Midgard's planetary power struggle. Anyone interested in games in the Tribes of Crane tradition should give it a close look".

Reviewer Charles R. Day stated in the July–August 1986 issue of Paper Mayhem magazine that the quality of the game's products such as the turnsheets and reports were the "best ever offered in a PBM game". He concluded that "If you're looking for a game which will test your skills of not only military, but politics and economics as well; if you're looking for game that offers excellent player inter-action or just to be on your own style of play, then Midguard [sic] is the game", noting that it is for players of all levels.

The main complaint players had in the initial years was a slow turnaround time for game turns which had been corrected by 1987. Midgard scored #9 on the Best Play By Mail Game of 1987 list in Paper Mayhem Magazine. In 1996, reviewer B. E. Wright stated that "Midgard is a fine game", holding back top marks due to a negative experience with a gamemaster at the time. He noted that the game had been on an upward trend in quality recently, suggesting that appeared to be continuing and that players of the period should "Go in with moderate expectations and you may find Midgard one of the best PBM games ever. And it may be in time. We shall see".

== Reviews ==
- G.M. The Independent Fantasy Roleplaying Magazine #2

== See also ==
- List of play-by-mail games

== Bibliography ==
- Babcock, Chris (December 2013). "Diplomacy" (PDF). Suspense and Decision. No. 2. p. 16.
- Day, Charles R. (July–August 1986). "A Review of Midgard". Paper Mayhem. No. 19. p. 28.
- Harvey, Chris (Spring 1984). "The Future of PBM". Flagship. No. 2. p. 21.
- Harvey, Chris (April–May 2003). "My Life in Games" (PDF). Flagship. No. 102. p. 26.
- Marte, Stephen (November–December 1987). "Midgard". Paper Mayhem. No. 27. pp. 6–7.
- McLain, Bob (August 1, 1993). "Play By Mail: The Infancy of Cyberspace". Pyramid. sjgames.com.
- Palmer, Nicky (Spring 1985). "Midgard: Fantasy De Luxe". Flagship. No. 6. pp. 4–6.
- Popolizio, Mike; LeBlanc, Liz; Popolizio, Marti (January–February 1990). "Revamping a Classic! The Redesign of BSE". Paper Mayhem. No. 40. pp. 8–10.
- Rayment, John R. (January 1992). "Midgard: Out of the Ashes". Flagship. No. 35. pp. 21–25.
- "Rick Loomis on Play-By-Mail [Editor Intro]". The Space Gamer. No. #75. July–August 1985. p. 35.
- "TSG Surveys: Play-By-Mail Game Companies". The Space Gamer. No. 33. November 1980. p. 13.
- Townsend, Jim (1988). "The PBM Corner". White Wolf Magazine. No. 11. p. 20.
- "Where We're Heading". Paper Mayhem. No. 27. November–December 1987. p. 2.
- Wright, B. E. (March–April 1996). "Midgard". Paper Mayhem. No. 77. pp. 23–26.
