= Michael Shapiro (actor) =

American actor, and theatre director

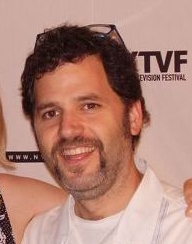
- Shapiro in 2007
- Born: Michael David Shapiro; December 29, 1965 (age 60); Springfield, Massachusetts, U.S.
- Other name: Mike Shapiro
- Occupations: Actor, theatre director
- Years active: 1991–present
- Spouse: Peggy Stafford
- Children: 2

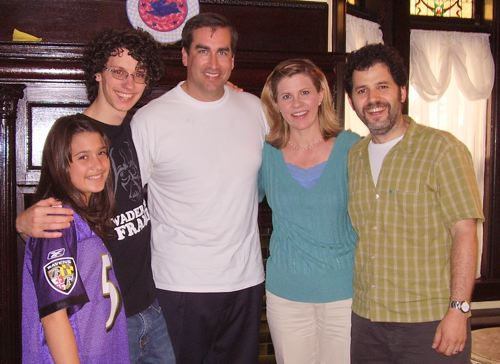
From left to right: Ashley Reyes, Peter Brensinger, Rob Riggle, Lori Hammel and Shapiro at the 2007 New York Television Festival

Michael David Shapiro (/ʃəˈpaɪroʊ/ shə-PY-roh) (born December 29, 1965) is an American actor. He is best known for voicing the G-Man and Barney Calhoun in the Half-Life video game series.

== Early life ==
Shapiro was born in Springfield, Massachusetts in 1965, and later moved to Seattle, where he worked for many years in the 1980s and '90s. In 1987, Shapiro helped launch the Annex Theatre in Seattle and performed in many of their productions. In the 1990s, he also did some acting work for Microsoft, including as the voice of McZee in 3D Movie Maker in 1995, and as the host of the MSN Preview in 1996. Shapiro moved to Brooklyn, New York in 2000.

== Career ==
Shapiro is most famous for voicing the G-Man and Barney Calhoun in all of the characters' appearances in the Half-Life series. Other video games in which he is credited as "Mike Shapiro" are Blood II: The Chosen, Grand Theft Auto: Liberty City Stories and Torin's Passage. Shapiro has also voiced many radio and TV commercials most notably ones for the office supply store Staples In which he would also provide the voice for the Staples Easy Button. Shapiro is a director of television shows and theater productions, with some of his shows being shown on Strike.TV. In 2007, Shapiro co-directed a TV pilot, Family Values, starring Rob Riggle; the pilot was screened at the New York Television Festival. Shapiro has also acted in recurring roles in television shows, including as Dr. Isaac Haimes in Law & Order: Special Victims Unit in the 2024–2025 season.

== Filmography ==
=== Video games ===
Year	Title	Role
1994	Super Punch-Out!!	Additional Voices
1995	Torin's Passage	Torin, Boogle
1997	Betrayal in Antara	Paolo, Gar Warren, Naku
1997	Big Thinkers! Kindergarten	Ben
1997	Spy Fox in "Dry Cereal"	Johnny Gecko
1998	Police Quest: SWAT 2	Sergeant Markossian, Suspect, Gangster, Vehicle Driver
1998	Get Medieval	Elf
1998	Half-Life	G-Man, HECU Soldiers, Security Guards, Scientists
1998	Blood II: The Chosen	Ishmael, Additional Voices
1999	Sin Mission Pack: Wages of Sin	Gianni Manero
1999	Starsiege	Squadmate #8
1999	Half-Life: Opposing Force	Otis, G-Man, Security Guards, Male Black Ops
1999	Gorky 17	
2000	Sanity: Aiken's Artifact	Tiger Cage Guy
2001	Half-Life: Blue Shift	Otis, Miller, Security Guards
2001	Half-Life: Decay	Scientists, Security Guards,
2004	Half-Life 2	G-Man, Barney Calhoun
2005	Grand Theft Auto: Liberty City Stories	Richard Goblin, Flashback FM Imaging Voice, Commercial Voice
2006	Half-Life 2: Episode One	G-Man, Barney Calhoun
2007	Crackdown	Special Agent Camerino, Master Wong, SUV Car
2007	Half-Life 2: Episode Two	G-Man
2008	Order Up!	Tommy Cheesehead, Salty Sam, Male Chef
2013	Dota 2	Oracle
2013	Grand Theft Auto V	The Local Population
2020	Half-Life: Alyx	G-Man
2022	Horizon Forbidden West	Javad the Willing, Parallo

=== Software ===
Year	Title	Role	Notes
1995	3D Movie Maker	McZee	Interactive 3D graphics software for children
1996	MSN Preview	Michael	Promotional video and interactive software

=== Television ===
Year	Title	Role	Notes
2004	Interpol Investigates	Narrator	12 episodes
2004	Shorties Watchin' Shorties	Additional Voices	13 episodes
2023	Law & Order: Organized Crime	Coroner	Episode: "Tag: GEN"
2024–2025	Law & Order: Special Victims Unit	Dr. Isaac Haimes	2 episodes

=== Film ===
Year	Title	Role	Notes
1991	Listen Carefully	Christa's deaf son	
1995	Georgia	Brian	
1999	The Engagement Party	Matthew	
1999	Lovers Lane	Deputy David Schwick	
2007	Day Zero	News Announcer (voice)	
2015	3rd Street Blackout	Josh	
2019	The Pulse	Travis	Short film
