= Daniel Bernstein =

American video game composer

Daniel Bernstein is a composer for video games and movies. Born in Leningrad in the Soviet Union (now part of Russia), he received a B.S. in computer science and an M.A. in music composition from the University of Virginia. Bernstein started in games in 1996 "working in development and sound design". He has also worked as a composer for Monolith Productions where he collaborated with Guy Whitmore on titles such as Blood and Claw. Outside of video games, he also wrote the soundtrack for short movies (Kansas in 1998 and Maid of Honor in 1999).

Changing career, he joined WildTangent as the Director of Product Strategy, and later left in 2002 to create Sandlot Games.

While still acting as Sandlot's CEO, he returned to composition with the soundtrack to The Penitent Man in 2010.

== Video game credits ==
Year	Title	Role(s)	Notes
1988	Moria	UNIX hangup signal fix, many bug fixes	MS-DOS version
1994	Safety Monkey	Video artist	
1994	AnnaTommy	3D Intro Architecture	
1996	Muppet Treasure Island	Digital Video Technical Director, Associate Producer, Game design	
1996	MultiPlayer BattleTech: Solaris	Music, sound programming	With Nate Burgess
1997	Air Warrior II	Sound lead, music composer	
1997	Blood	Music, sound development	With Guy Whitmore
1997	Claw	Audio lead, audio director, music	With Guy Whitmore
1998	Shogo: Mobile Armor Division	Audio composer	With Guy Whitmore
1998	Get Medieval	Audio director, music, sound design, movie compilation	With Guy Whitmore
1998	Blood II: The Chosen	Interactive Music Arrangement, music	With Guy Whitmore
1998	Rage of Mages	Product Acquisitions, Translation	
1999	Septerra Core: Legacy of the Creator	Product Manager	
1999	Rage of Mages II: Necromancer	Project Manager, game text, special thanks	
1999	ōdi∙um	Producer	
2002	Blasterball 2: Revolution	Sound and music	
2003	Tradewinds	Sound and music	
2003	Haunted Childhood	Sound and music	
2004	Super Granny	Sound and music	
2004	Snail Mail	Sound and music	
2004	Blasterball 2: Holidays	Sound and music	
2005	Tradewinds 2	Sound and music	
2005	Granny in Paradise	Sound and music	
2005	Slyder	Special thanks	
2005	Barnyard Invasion	Audio, business, production, game design	
2005	Incrediball: The Seven Sapphires	CEO, audio	
2006	Westward	CEO, audio	
2006	Super Granny 3	Sound and music	
2006	Glyph	Sound and music	
2006	Cake Mania	Sound and music	
2007	Super Granny 4	Sound and music	
2007	Burger Island	CEO of Sandlot Games	
2008	Eye for Design	Audio	
2008	Cake Mania 2: Jill's Next Adventure!	Sound and music	
2008	Westward II: Heroes of the Frontier	Audio design	With Somatone
2008	Westward III: Gold Rush	Audio design	With Somatone
2009	Westward IV: All Aboard	Audio design	
2009	Kuros	Audio, story	
2009	Boonka	President and CEO of Sandlot Games, Voice acting	
2010	Rasputin's Curse	President and CEO of Sandlot Games, sound, music	
2014	Mage and Minions	Sound effects	
