= Jinju Hyeong clan =

Korean clan from South Gyeongsang Province

Jinju Hyong clan
- Country: Korea
- Current region: Jinju
- Founder: Hyeong Ong
- Connected members: Hyung Min-woo
- Website: http://www.hyongc.com.ne.kr/

The Jinju Hyong clan (Korean: 진주 형씨; Hanja: 晋州 邢氏) is one of the Korean clans. Their Bon-gwan is in Jinju, South Gyeongsang Province. According to research conducted in 2000, the Jinju Hyong clan numbered 6277. Their founder was Hyeong Ong who was dispatched and was settled in Pyongyang as one of Hanlin Academy during Emperor Taizong of Tang’s reign to respond the request from Yeongnyu of Goguryeo. Hyeong Bang (Hanja: 邢昉), a 13th descendant of Hyeong Ong, worked as Chief Minister (Sijung; 시중; 侍中) in Goryeo during Myeongjong of Goryeo’s reign. Hyeong Gongmi (Hanja: 邢公美), a 15th descendant of Hyeong Ong, made an achievement when he fought against Wokou. After Hyeong Gongmi (Hanja: 邢公美) became Prince of Jinju, Hyeong Gongmi (Hanja: 邢公美) founded Jinju Hyong clan and made Jinju, Jinju Hyong clan's Bon-gwan.

== See also ==
- Korean clan names of foreign origin
