= Priest (2011 film) =

2011 film by Scott Stewart

- Theatrical release poster
- Directed by: Scott Stewart
- Written by: Cory Goodman
- Based on: Priest by Hyung Min-woo
- Produced by: Michael De Luca; Joshua Donen; Mitchell Peck
- Starring: Paul Bettany; Karl Urban; Cam Gigandet; Maggie Q; Lily Collins; Stephen Moyer; Christopher Plummer
- Cinematography: Don Burgess
- Edited by: Lisa Zeno Churgin
- Music by: Christopher Young
- Production companies: Screen Gems; Tokyopop
- Distributed by: Sony Pictures Releasing
- Release date: May 13, 2011
- Running time: 87 minutes
- Country: United States
- Language: English
- Budget: $60 million
- Box office: $78.3 million

Priest is a 2011 American action horror film directed by Scott Stewart, written by Cory Goodman, and starring Paul Bettany as the title character. It is loosely based on the Korean comic of the same name by Hyung Min-woo, in turn inspired by the computer game Blood by Monolith Productions. Set in an alternate universe where humanity and vampires have warred for centuries, after the last Vampire War, a veteran Warrior Priest lives in obscurity until his niece (Lily Collins) is kidnapped by vampires.

The film was released on May 13, 2011. The film earned over $78 million at the box office against a $60 million production budget, but it was panned by critics, who praised the film's visual style and art direction while criticizing the movie's use of genre clichés, writing, acting, editing, and action scenes.

== Plot ==
A centuries-long war between humans and vampires devastated the planet's surface and led to a theocracy under "The Church". Despite vampires' vulnerability to sunlight and humans technological advancements, their strength and speed made them impossible to defeat until humanity sheltered in walled cities and trained elite warriors, the Priests, who turned the tide. After the war, most vampires were killed, while the remainder were placed in reservations. The Clergy thus abandons the surviving Priests, who struggle to integrate into city society. Outside the walled cities, some humans seek out a living, free from The Church's totalitarian control.

One particular Priest (only referred to as Priest) is approached by Hicks, the sheriff of a free town, Augustine. Hicks informed Priest that a vampire group mortally wounded Priest's brother Owen, killed his sister-in-law Shannon, and kidnapped his niece Lucy. Being in love with Lucy, Hicks asks for Priest's help in rescuing her. Priest asks the Clergy to reinstate his authority, but leader Monsignor Orelas refuses, dismissing the vampire story. Priest leaves the city and Orelas sends three Priests and a Priestess to bring him back.

Priest and Hicks arrive at Nightshade Reservation, occupied by vampires and Familiars, humans who serve them. After foiling an ambush by the residents, the pair discovers that most vampires shelter in the vampire Hive of Sola Mira, believed to be abandoned after the war. There they meet Priestess who joins them, choosing to ally with Priest rather than The Church. Priest, Priestess, and Hicks destroy a massive Hive Guardian. They discover the vampires have bred a new army and dug a tunnel towards Jericho town.

At nightfall, the other three of Orelas' Priests arrive at Jericho. An armored train arrives, unleashing a horde of vampires led by a powerful human wearing a black hat. When the Priests reject Black Hat's offer to join him, he kills them all.

The next morning, Priest, Priestess, and Hicks arrive in Jericho, finding the town empty and the three Priests crucified. Priest deduces that the vampires use the train to travel by day and attack free towns at night, and their eventual target is the walled cities. He explains to Hicks that cities are covered with clouds of smoke and ash which permanently deprive them of sunlight and make them ideal vampire hunting grounds.

Hicks gets angry with Priest's cold attitude, believing he will kill Lucy if she is infected. Priestess reveals Lucy is actually Priest's daughter. He was in a relationship with Shannon before he was taken by the Church, at which point Owen stepped in as his surrogate.

The trio catch up to the train. While Priestess rushes ahead to sabotage the railroad tracks, Priest and Hicks board the train. Battling vampires and Familiars, the two are overpowered by Black Hat just as they find Lucy. Black Hat is revealed to be Priest's former comrade, captured in the attack on Sola Mira. The vampire Queen gave him her blood, making him the first Vampire-Human hybrid who can survive the sun. As Priest fights Black Hat, Lucy discovers the truth about her parentage. On the tracks ahead of the train, Priestess battles several Familiars, but one destroys the explosives' detonator. To accomplish her mission, she mounts the explosives on her motorbike and drives it into the train engine, jumping off before the ensuing explosion. The subsequent derailment kills the vampires and Black Hat while Hicks, Priest, Priestess, and Lucy escape.

Priest returns to the city and confronts Orelas during Mass, telling him of the burnt train containing the vampires' bodies, but not the Queen's. He throws a vampire head onto the floor, shocking everyone in the room. Orelas, in denial, insists that the war is over. Outside the city Priest meets Priestess, who confirms other priests have been notified and will meet them soon.

== Cast ==
- Paul Bettany as Priest
- Karl Urban as Black Hat
- Cam Gigandet as Hicks
- Maggie Q as Priestess
- Lily Collins as Lucy Pace
- Brad Dourif as Salesman
- Stephen Moyer as Owen Pace
- Christopher Plummer as Monsignor Orelas
- Alan Dale as Monsignor Chamberlain
- Mädchen Amick as Shannon Pace
- Jacob Hopkins as Boy
- Josh Wingate as Familiar
- Dave Florek as Crocker
- Joel Polinsky as Dr. Tomlin

== Production ==
The priests of our story are like Jedi knights. They have these supernatural abilities to fight vampires and they saved humanity before the movie even begins. Now, a generation later, society has moved on from war, and the priests are like pariahs. They're almost like Vietnam vets—they've been cast aside by society and they're now reviled and feared.

— Director Scott Stewart

Priest is directed by Scott Stewart and written by Cory Goodman. The film is based on the supernatural horror and action Korean comics Priest by Min-Woo Hyung.

The project was first announced in March 2005 when the studio Screen Gems bought Goodman's spec script. In January 2006, Andrew Douglas, who directed The Amityville Horror, was attached to direct Priest. In June 2006, actor Gerard Butler entered negotiations to star as the title character, and filming was scheduled to start in Mexico on October 1, 2006. Filming did not proceed and, by three years later, director Douglas had been replaced by Stewart, while Butler had been replaced in the starring role by Paul Bettany. Stewart and Bettany had previously worked together in the Screen Gems film Legion.

With a budget of $60 million, filming began in August 2009 in Los Angeles, California, and it concluded in November 2009. The film was the most expensive production from Screen Gems, to that date, and as of 2018 is still tied for third-most expensive, behind only Underworld: Awakening and Resident Evil: Retribution.

Tokyopop flew Min-Woo Hyung to where production was taking place so the comics' creator could visit the art department and discuss the film with Stewart. The film diverges from the comics in following a different timeline of events and adding elements of the sci-fi western, cyberpunk and post-apocalyptic science-fiction genres. The director described Priest's vampires as not being human in origin, and humans bitten by vampires became familiars instead. There are different forms of vampires, such as hive drones, guardians, and a queen. Since the vampires were intended to move quickly, they were fully computer-generated for the film. While vampires are harmed by sunlight in most lore, the film's vampires are instead photosensitive, being albino cave-dwellers. Stewart said, "They are the enemy we don't really understand, but we fought them for centuries. They are mysterious and alien, with their own culture. You sense that they think and communicate, but you don't really understand what they are saying." The director also called Priest an homage to The Searchers with the title character being similar to John Wayne's character and the vampires being similar to the Comanche. The animated prologue for the film was created by American animator and director Genndy Tartakovsky. The production team includes:

- Michael De Luca
- Josh Bratman
- Shareena Carlson
- Joshua Donen
- Glenn S. Gainor
- Steve Galloway
- Stuart J. Levy
- Mitchell Peck
- Nicola Stern

== Theatrical release ==
Priest was released in the United States and Canada on May 13, 2011. The film's release date changed numerous times in 2010 and 2011. It was originally scheduled for October 1, 2010, but it moved earlier to August 27, 2010, to fill a weekend slot when another Screen Gems film, Resident Evil: Afterlife, was postponed. When the filmmakers wanted to convert Priest from 2D to 3D, the film was newly scheduled for release on January 14, 2011. It was delayed again to May 13, 2011, so the film could attract summertime audiences.

Priest was released outside the United States and Canada on May 6, 2011, in four markets. It grossed an estimated $5.6 million over the weekend, with "decent debuts" of $2.9 million in Russia and $1.8 million in Spain. It performed poorly in the United Kingdom with under $700,000.

The film was released in the United States and Canada on May 13, 2011, in 2,864 theaters with 2,006 having 3D screenings. It grossed an estimated $14.5 million over the weekend, ranking fourth at the box office. Its performance was considered subpar compared to similar films in the Underworld series and Resident Evil series. To date, Priest has grossed an estimated $76.5 million, of which $29.1 million was from North America.

== Critical reception ==
Priest was largely panned by critics. Review aggregator Rotten Tomatoes gives the film a score of 16% based on reviews from 96 critics with a consensus that "Priest is admittedly sleek and stylish, but those qualities are wasted on a dull, derivative blend of sci-fi, action, and horror clichés". At Metacritic, which assigns a weighted average score out of 100 to reviews from mainstream critics, the film received an average score of 41 based on 13 reviews, indicating "mixed or average reviews". CinemaScore polls reported that the average grade audiences gave the film was a "C+" on an A+ to F scale.

== See also ==
- Legion, a film also directed by Scott Stewart and starring Paul Bettany.
- Vampire films, about vampires in cinema and other films featuring vampires.
