= Claw (video game) =

1997 video game

- Developer: Monolith Productions
- Publisher: Monolith Productions
- Designer: Garrett Price
- Programmers: Brian L. Goble; John LaCasse
- Artist: Garrett Price
- Composers: Daniel Bernstein; Guy Whitmore
- Platform: Windows
- Release: NA: 9 September 1997; EU: 17 February 1998
- Genre: Platform
- Modes: Single-player, multiplayer

Claw is a 1997 video game developed and published by Monolith Productions for Microsoft Windows. It is a 2D side-scrolling platform game in which players guide Captain Claw, an anthropomorphic pirate cat, through 14 levels. The goal is for Captain Claw to escape the imprisonment of the Cocker-Spaniards, assemble a pirate crew, and find the Amulet of Nine Lives.

The game also features an online multiplayer feature for up to 64 players. Developed alongside Blood, the game featured cutscenes animated by former Disney animators, with the studio also having explored the potential of releasing the title as an arcade game.

Upon release, the game received mixed reviews, with some critics praising its visual design and levels, and others faulting its difficulty. Several reviewers expressed the release of a 2D game was outdated during a time of adoption of 3D in the platforming genre. Although the game was commercially successful for the studio, planned development on a 3D sequel never made it to release.

== Gameplay ==
Screenshot from the second level

Claw is a 2D platform video game played from a side-scrolling perspective. Players, as Captain Claw, must locate pieces of a map to discover the Amulet of Nine Lives. Players navigate 14 levels, featuring environments such as a wharf, a forest, and a city. Enemies can be defeated in melee combat using a kick, punch, or sword, or from a distance using a pistol with ammo found throughout the levels. Levels also feature power-ups: catnip, once collected, allows players to perform attacks faster or jump higher, and swords can also be upgraded to shoot bolts of fire, ice or lightning. Items, such as exploding barrels, can also be picked up and thrown. Passing a flag triggers a checkpoint that allows players to return to that point upon death. The game features boss fights at the end of many levels.

Claw supports multiplayer for up to 64 players over a local area network or modem. Players can simultaneously compete in levels, racing for the fastest time or to collect the most treasure. Players could also upload their best times to Monolith's website to compare high scores and rankings. The game also features a level editor, a tool allowing players to create and edit their own levels.

== Plot ==
A famous cat pirate, Captain Nathaniel Joseph Claw, is imprisoned by the Cocker-Spaniards after they attack and sink his ship. In the prison cell, waiting for his execution, he finds a note and a piece of a map hidden in the wall. The note tells of the Amulet of Nine Lives: a mystical artifact that grants its wearer near-immortality.

Breaking out of his cell, Claw sets out to collect all nine gems of the amulet and retrieve it for himself. Claw escapes his cell and defeats the warden, Le Rauxe, travelling through a forest to the town of El Puerto del Lobo. At a bar, he overhears a conversation between two of the crew of Captain Red Tail, a lion who is Claw's archenemy. He learns Red Tail is looking for the gems of the amulet as well, and that Red Tail's first mate, Gabriel, has one of them in his possession.

Stowing away on Red Tail's ship, Claw defeats Gabriel and the seamen and hides in the ship until it sets port near the Pirate's Cove. In the caves of the Cove, he discovers his old crew, presumed dead after the attack on his ship. The crew informs Claw that they were given three gems by a merchant in the tavern, but were forced to give two of them to Red Tail; they managed to keep the third as Red Tail believed there were only two in their possession. The crew then reveals that Red Tail has set sail for Tiger Island, a legendary place most doubted even existed, including Claw.

Claw progresses through underwater caves to Tiger Island to defeat Red Tail's crew, but Red Tail escapes. Entering the Tiger Temple at the heart of the island to claim the amulet, he defeats Omar, the captain of the tiger guard, who holds the final gem. Claw places the gems on a pedestal, and Princess Adora appears. She gives Claw the amulet, granting him nine lives. Omar is sworn to defend the holder of the Amulet, thus becoming Claw's bodyguard. The game ends with Claw on his ship with the amulet, alongside his crew and Omar.

== Development and release ==
Claw was the first title in development by Monolith Productions, an American game studio based in Kirkland, Washington. It was formed by former staff of Edmark, including Jason Hall, Brian Goble, and Garrett Price. Development took place over a two and a half year period involving over 40 staff. The studio's first project was Games Sampler 2, a demo disc showcasing games for Windows 95, which it developed for Microsoft in 1995 while working from its offices. After its completion, Monolith moved into its own offices and began work on Claw alongside a 3D project, Blood.

Price conceived of Claw and its pirate cat protagonist based on an art school project originally intended for a comic or graphic novel, drawing inspiration from The Secret of NIMH. Studio CEO Jason Hall stated that the aim of development was to create a quality platforming game from frustration of the "lack of exciting games of this genre" on the personal computer. Goble, who had already built a 2D scrolling engine for The Adventures of MicroMan, developed the game's engine after seeing a parallax scrolling demo for the newly released DirectX. The success of Jazz Jackrabbit had recently demonstrated that side-scrolling games could succeed on PC. To support the game's visual design, the studio hired a team of former Disney animators to produce 23 minutes of cutscenes. Composer and audio director Daniel Bernstein prioritised the use of voice acting to make in-game characters feel interactive, stating it was "important" that every character and enemy "have something different to say" when prompted by direct and indirect cues.

Claw was originally intended to feature as part of a networked multiplayer system on arcade cabinets, as part of a planned partnership between Microsoft and the National Amusement Network Inc. The system would have supported Internet connectivity for up to 256 players to connect online and compete on a leaderboard. To facilitate an arcade version, Monolith created an arcade port of Claw using a library named DirectAcade that simplified gameplay elements for arcade controls. Multiplayer features for the game were ultimately hosted by Engage Games Online and Kali. Engage later released the game on its GameStorm online service.

Monolith opted to prioritise the development of Blood over Claw, with the former being released in March 1997. Claw was self-published by the studio on 9 September 1997, available in a CD-ROM and DVD version. Co-founder Toby Gladwell recalled that the game took more time and money to develop than anticipated. Hall stated that Claw cost over one million dollars to create. However, as Monolith self-published the game, it was more profitable to the studio than Blood despite selling fewer copies.

=== Sequel ===
Monolith planned a 3D sequel to Claw using its LithTech engine. Price stated that the concept would have centered on Claw being cursed after stealing an artefact from a sea cave, allowing players to shapeshift between versions of the character with different strengths and weaknesses. The studio never found a suitable publisher, and the project was dropped. Techland, the Polish publisher of Claw, was rumored to be developing a sequel, but instead released Nikita: The Mystery of the Hidden Treasure in 2009.

== Reception ==
Reception

Review scores
Publication	Score
AllGame	4/5
CNET Gamecenter	4/10
GameSpot	7.7/10
PC Gamer (US)	65%
PC Games (US)	A
PC PowerPlay	62%
Online Gaming Review	7.8/10
Ultimate PC	39%

Claw received mixed reviews. Several reviewers considered the game's 2D design was outdated by its 3D competitors, which had become more popular during the time of its development. Critics disagreed on whether the game compared favorably to older platforming titles, with several finding that it offered little new to the genre. PC Games acknowledged the game was conventional, but considered it so well made and playable that this was not an issue.

The visual presentation of Claw was praised, with reviewers highlighting character animations, sprites and backgrounds. GameSpot lauded the "lush hand-illustrated" backgrounds and its "beautifully rendered" sprites, considering them "aesthetically gorgeous". CNET considered the visuals more impressive than ever seen in a 2D platformer. PC Gamer praised the game's characters, stating they were "big, colorful and have loads of personality", and that the cutscenes were fluid and on par with Disney cartoons.

Critics were mixed on the gameplay design. Some critics found the game addictive and immersive, with Allgame enjoying its "interesting puzzles" and "expansive" levels that "give the game a feel of a role playing game". Describing the levels as "brilliant", GameSpot considered the gameplay well-designed and polished, enjoying the "divergent pathways and abundance of fun tricks of the terrain unique to each level". Reviewers observed the game was difficult. Whilst GameSpot considered the difficulty curve was "practically flawless", they wrote that levels could be lengthy, frustrating, and almost impossible to complete. The Online Gaming Review also faulted its checkpoint system for being unfriendly and that the game featured too many environmental hazards.

In a retrospective positive review, Destructoid wrote that Claw was "simple, accessible, familiar, and most of all fun", highlighting its "intricately designed" levels and critiquing the difficulty of the game due to its "frustrating and illogical" save system.
