= Shivers (video game) =

1995 video game

- Developer: Sierra On-Line
- Publisher: Sierra On-Line
- Producer: Wendy Albee
- Designers: Marcia Bales; Willie Eide
- Artist: Ron Spears
- Writers: Marcia Bales; Roberta Williams
- Composer: Guy Whitmore
- Platforms: Windows, Mac OS
- Release: Windows: NA: November 1995; EU: 1996; Mac OS: NA: May 30, 1996
- Genre: Adventure
- Mode: Single-player

Shivers is a single-player horror-themed PC adventure game, released on CD-ROM by Sierra On-Line in November 1995. It was developed with Sierra's Creative Interpreter. Being the first Sierra first-person adventure game, Shivers was compared to contemporary Myst and The 7th Guest, gaining praise mostly for its atmosphere. The game takes place in a fictitious haunted museum.

== Plot ==
Sir Hubert Windlenot was a peer of the British nobility, and as an archeologist, a member of the Royal Society. His interest in controversial fringe topics such as ancient astronauts, Hollow Earth, Atlantis and cryptozoology earned him the reputation of a mad scientist. Renouncing his life as a noble, he moved to America, where he attempted to open "Professor Windlenot's Museum of the Strange and Unusual" in Mt. Pleasant, Ohio, dedicated to his findings and theories. Construction took two decades to house both exhibits and thematic installations with several puzzles to entertain the visitors (such as an Ancient Egyptian-themed artificial lake featuring a solar barque, an underground maze that leads to a Dero installation, a greenhouse, and a diorama dedicated to Atlantis). However, Windlenot mysteriously disappeared before the museum was completed.

The player steps into the shoes of a teenager dared by his friends to spend the night on the grounds of the museum, which is said to be haunted.

Upon entering and exploring the museum, the player discovers that fifteen years prior, in 1980, while Windlenot was on one of his archaeological excursions, two students from the local high school had broken into the museum and accidentally released evil spirits from an exhibited set of ceramic vessels from the Moche Valley. These spirits, known as "Ixupi", draw the "life essence" or "Ka" from humans. They had been trapped in the vessels by the Zapana, a fictional South American indigenous people. The Ixupi are each associated with various materials, elements and natural forces, such as sand, cloth, wax, and electricity, which they can inhabit and lie in wait for unsuspecting humans. The Ixupi killed the teens, and eventually Windlenot himself, allowing three of the thirteen spirits to escape into the world.

The player becomes tasked with finding a way to capture the ten remaining spirits before the sun rises (though no actual time limit is imposed on the player) and freeing the trapped ghosts of Windlenot and the teens. This can be done by finding each vessel and its matching talisman/lid throughout the museum, and then using it on the corresponding Ixupi to capture it. In order to find all these items, the player has to explore the museum by completing puzzles of varying difficulty, navigating mazes, and making use of secret passages. Along the way, the player can find documents chronicling the exploits of Windlenot and the belongings of the two students, expanding their backstory, with elements hinting at their lives, relationships and motivations.

At the end of the game, the player captures the electricity Ixupi from the museum's power generator, causing an explosion. The player's friends appear outside the broken wall as dawn breaks. A newspaper clipping then reveals that the bodies of Windlenot and the two teens were recovered by the authorities, solving the 15-year-old mystery of their disappearance.

== Gameplay ==
The first area in the game, the exterior of which resembles the lion gate terrace of Sigiriya in Sri Lanka

Playing in first-person perspective, the game is similar in style to the Virgin Interactive/Trilobyte production, The 7th Guest (which introduced this style of gaming), but is closer in execution to Broderbund/Cyan's Myst.

As with all point and click games, the player clicks (a computer mouse or other pointing device) in order to move their character around and interact with the environment. Throughout the game, players will gather information, complete minigames/puzzles, as well as collect and piece together vessel fragments, with the ultimate goal of trapping all of the Ixupi and escaping the museum.

The only interface feature is an elaborate bar at the bottom of the screen which mostly serves as a health bar, showing how much "life essence" the player has remaining; life is lost whenever the player is attacked by an Ixupi. It also serves as the game's inventory, with the active Ixupi vessel or cover the player is currently holding, with the option to examine it in close-up. It also indicates progress in the game, as the vessels with the trapped Ixupi are placed there as trophies.

The vessels and their covers are the only items that can be picked up and stored in the inventory. Uncommonly for an adventure game, the inventory can hold only one of these items: a vessel, a cover, or a vessel combined with its cover. This means that the player can pick up a vessel and then find and pick up its corresponding cover to complete it, but if the player attempts to pick up an item that can't be combined with the one held (i.e. another vessel or a cover corresponding to another vessel), the items will switch positions. This feature obliges the player to take notes of where they have found or dropped which item (although the placed item can occasionally be moved elsewhere in the museum by an Ixupi), and to travel back and forth in order to pick them up.

While holding a completed vessel, the player can look for the corresponding Ixupi in order to trap it. Each vessel is marked with a Zapana pictograph representing a material, helping the player associate each vessel with an Ixupi.

The locations where the items are found are mostly fixed every time, although which is where is mostly random, ensuring slightly different game progression each time the game starts.

A "Flashback" feature allows the player to review game cutscenes and re-read most of the in-game text that has been found, such as books from the museum library or the victims' notebooks. These not only advance the game's backstory but also contain hints to several of the puzzles.

Upon completion of the game's main story, the player may then continue to roam freely through the museum, with all ten captured Ixupi appearing along the health bar. One benefit of this is the luxury of getting to read over the many in-game exhibit descriptions without the worry of being attacked by Ixupi. Reading these descriptions or exploring previously undiscovered parts of the museum can continue to add to the player's score.

== Development ==
The game was programmed in SCI-32, Sierra's proprietary game engine, interpreter and programming language. A challenge faced by the team was the steep learning curves, as many were inexperienced in 3d modeling or adventure game design, and it was the first time the SCI language was used for a 1st-person adventure video game.

Roberta Williams served as creative consultant and scriptwriter, which was during the time she was working on Phantasmagoria.

In somewhat of a deviation from other FMV-based games of the era, dialogues are provided with closed captions. This was a suggestion by lead game developer Willie Eide, who came from a deaf family.

=== Themes ===
Designer Marcia Bales credited her interest in travels and archeology as her main drive force for the game. Some of the footage seen in a cutscene was taken by Bales herself during a trip in Belize around 1994.

Regarding the themes seen in the fictional museum, Bales claimed that most of them presented are factual, except for Windlenot's pseudoscientific theories. The way the museum was designed, with each room assigned to a different artist, reflected the Professor's deductive fallacies of connecting otherwise unconnected facts to draw his conclusions. The elements were left for the player to decide how much of the Professor's theories were arbitrary.

The concept of the Ixupi is a retelling of an almost universal motif of vampiric spirits sucking the life out of humans, often coming out of the elements. The Ancient Egyptian concept of the soul was also an inspiration.

=== Gameplay ===
Shivers was the first first-person adventure game by Sierra On-Line to feature a nameless and unseen silent protagonist, instead of a visible player character.

Bales mentioned the game Mixed-Up Mother Goose Deluxe as an inspiration to design Shivers as an open-ended game, with the random elements enhancing the non-linear gameplay; a characteristic considered uncommon for an adventure game. Once entering the museum, the player is immediately free to explore and access almost all locations, without having to solve a puzzle to see what is next. The player's order of actions are the factor of how the backstory elements are revealed, without mattering the order these are discovered.

=== Graphics ===
The game was created using scans of watercolors – some 2500 of them – touched up in Photoshop, along with 3D Studio. Each room was assigned to one out of a team of ten artists with the art director ensuring continuity and consistency.

The cutscenes were filmed with live actors in front of a blue screen, who were superimposed on the digital backgrounds with Ultimatte. Each shot required proper camera angles and lensing before filming to ensure matching perspective and quality with the digital background. Occasionally, masonite props would stand in for foreground objects. The actors were found by talent agencies and were coached by Bales, producer Wendy Albee and director Tony Ober.

=== Sound and music ===
"If you look at movie credits, you’d see sound designers, a composer, sound editors, an orchestrator, a sound coordinator, and foley artists [..]. So far in the computer industry, at least where the industry is right now, all those roles are often rolled into one person."

— Guy Whitmore (Composer and Sound Designer)

Guy Whitmore worked as a sound engineer, sound designer and music composer for the video game soundtrack. According to context, some pieces were composed as orchestral music whereas others were more modern. Some bands were cited as inspiration, such as Nine Inch Nails. Whitmore also had dark ambient music in mind. The interactive nature of the game demanded for a repetitive motif which would provide the background and foreboding mood of suspension for the player, while being unnoticed in the same time. The crescendo happens in the cues whenever the player triggers an attack of an Ixupi monster.

Sound effects were derived mostly from a stock sound effects CD. The mumblings heard in the abandoned theatre is a relevant speech by the Ghost from a Hamlet performance. As well as utilizing sound / speech recordings for Shivers' music, Whitmore also sampled speech from the game's actors in select tracks. Examples being Rodney Sherwood's delivery of the name "Ra" (as the museum announcer) being the basis of the music in the Gods and Religious Items exhibit, or his delivery of "Welcome", and an evil laugh (as the game announcer), featuring in the music for the basement.

== Reception ==
Reception

Review scores
Publication	Score
GameSpot	6.6/10
Next Generation	3/5
PC Gamer (US)	84%
Adventure Classic Gaming	3/5
Jeuxvideo.com	17/20
Just Adventure	C
PC Entertainment	4/5
MacUser	2.5/5

Shivers drew mostly praise for its atmosphere. Presenting a deviation from earlier Sierra titles, the game was both praised and criticized for the same reasons, while it also drew comparisons with Myst and The 7th Guest. It holds an aggregated 72.2% score on GameRankings, based on reviews from various professional critics.

Quandary gave the game a 5 out of 5, praising the atmosphere and simplicity of gameplay, mentioning the ample number of save game slots and closed captions among the game's advantages. Next Generation, while briefly complimenting the graphics and interface, derided the game as an unoriginal Myst clone. They added that "the long load times, grating music, and overreaching puzzles keep it mediocre at best." French site Jeuxvideo.com called it "an undeniable success". In a retrospective review, Adventure Lantern noted that the game still looked fairly pleasant after its time, and its (mostly) clever design, while praising the game's mood and atmospheric soundtrack. Adventure Classic Gaming named Shivers a sleeper hit of the year and recognised its cult status.

Ron Dulin of GameSpot called the gameplay repetitive, as the player is forced to travel back and forth many times after a certain point. Ray Ivey of Just Adventure favored the game's atmosphere, and praised the "Flashback" feature.

All Game Guide described it as "lacking" while Finnish magazine Pelit considered it an example of Sierra's downward spiral, criticizing the puzzles and the storyline.

== Sequel ==
Shivers was followed in 1997 by Shivers II: Harvest of Souls which takes place in a ghost town.
