= Get Medieval =

1998 video game

- Developer: Monolith Productions
- Publishers: Monolith Productions; Microïds
- Producer: Chris Hewett
- Designers: Chris Hewett; Jace Hall
- Programmers: Brian L. Goble; John LaCasse; Bryan Bouwman
- Artists: Garrett Price; Israel Evans; Aaron Carlson
- Composers: Daniel Bernstein; Guy Whitmore
- Platform: Windows 95
- Release: NA: August 24, 1998; EU: September 1998
- Genres: Dungeon crawl, hack and slash
- Modes: Single-player, multiplayer

Get Medieval is a 1998 hack and slash dungeon crawl video game developed and published by Monolith Productions and Microïds for Microsoft Windows. The player controls one of four characters looking for the exit in a series of dungeons. The game is similar to that of the 1985 Atari Games arcade video game Gauntlet.

== Gameplay ==
It can be played in three modes (Dragon Quest, Random Dungeon, Custom Dungeon) and on four difficulty levels. The game's four player characters: Archer (Eryc), The Barbarian (Zared), The Sorceress (Levina), and The Avenger (Kellina), differ only in speed and strength. The slowest character (Zared) is the strongest, the fastest (Eryc) the weakest. Players can find Attack and Defense upgrades, losing them once their characters die. In the multiplayer mode, the game can be played via hotseat or network.

It includes world editor called "GMedit" (or "WapWorld") for making custom levels.

== Plot ==
The female warrior Kellina's father was killed by a giant dragon that terrorizes the kingdom and dwells in a dungeon protected by its minions. Kellina and her friends embark on a quest to kill the dragon.

== Reception ==
Reception

Aggregate score
| Aggregator | Score |
|---|---|
| GameRankings | 68% |

Review scores
| Publication | Score |
|---|---|
| CNET Gamecenter | 8/10 |
| Computer Games Strategy Plus | 2.5/5 |
| Computer Gaming World | 2.5/5 |
| EP Daily | 6/10 |
| GamePro | 4/5 |
| GameRevolution | B |
| GameSpot | 7.1/10 |
| IGN | 6.1/10 |
| Next Generation | 3/5 |
| PC Accelerator | 3/10 |
| PC Gamer (US) | 65% |

The game received average reviews according to the review aggregation website GameRankings. IGN's Trent C. Ward complimented the game's presentation, but felt that the humor in the game was overdone. Jason D'Aprile of GamePro noted the game's similarity to Gauntlet, but praised the game's sound effects and overall look. GameSpot's Tahsin Shamma wrote, "this game may be Gauntlet, but Gauntlet is still a lot of fun." GameRevolution called it "a nice update to a classic game [that] understands its limits and accepts its fate with wry humor." Next Generation wrote, "does the game offer anything new? Not really. But if you want to see how the pre-Pentium crowd lived, Get Medieval offers a pleasurable peek at the arcade arenas of the past, complete with chuckles."

== Reviews ==
- SF Site
