= Shivers II: Harvest of Souls =

1997 video game

- Developer: Sierra On-Line
- Publisher: Sierra On-Line
- Producer: Wendy Albee
- Designers: Marcia Bales; Willie Eide
- Artist: Ron Spears
- Writers: Marcia Bales; Jim Hicks
- Composer: Guy Whitmore
- Platform: Microsoft Windows
- Release: NA: April 14, 1997
- Genre: Adventure
- Mode: Single-player

Shivers II: Harvest of Souls (known as Harvest of Souls in Europe) is a horror-themed point-and-click PC adventure game, released in 1997 by Sierra On-Line. It is the sequel to Shivers.

== Gameplay ==
The game is played from a first-person perspective, like its predecessor and games like The 7th Guest and Myst. A series of rock music videos provide the player with clues to solving the game's puzzles.

== Plot ==
The game starts with the player checking into a motel in the sleepy town of Cyclone, Arizona, having been invited by their friends, members of the rock band Trip Cyclone, who are there filming a music video. Upon entering the motel, the player is greeted by a clerk who hands them a message that reads: "I have your friends, only a warrior can free them." The player walks into their room, sets down their bags and goes to bed. Once the player drifts to sleep, they have a strange dream involving a car wreck and a dead body. Once awake, the player is free to explore the town, which is now completely abandoned.

The player will quickly discover that their immediate goal is to find the twelve bahos (prayer sticks) scattered throughout the town and return them to the sacred kiva in Devil's Mouth Canyon just outside town. The bahos have been hidden by the villain known only as Darkcloud, a mysterious figure who wears a kachina mask, in order to test the player so that they may become "the warrior". The player is assured that once they become "the warrior", they will be able to free the members of Trip Cyclone, who have been transformed into petroglyphs. The player must ultimately deduce the true identity of Darkcloud and discover his actual plan.

== Reception ==
Reception

Review scores
Publication	Score
Adventure Gamers	3/5
AllGame	4/5
GameSpot	8.7/10
Next Generation	2/5
CD-Action	7/10

Next Generation rated it two stars out of five, and stated that "It might be the best puzzle game of its type, but it's still just a puzzle game that involves lots of mouse-clicking and leaps of logic to uncover its ancient mystery."
