= Torin's Passage =

1995 video game

- Developer: Sierra On-Line
- Publisher: Sierra On-Line
- Producer: Mark Seibert
- Designer: Al Lowe
- Programmer: Rob Kenny
- Artists: Jim Murphy; Bruce Sharp
- Writer: Al Lowe
- Composers: Michel Legrand; Al Lowe; Mark Seibert
- Platforms: MS-DOS, Windows 3.x, Windows 95, Mac
- Release: October 31, 1995
- Genre: Graphic adventure
- Mode: Single player

Torin's Passage is a point-and-click adventure game developed and published by Sierra On-Line in 1995. The game was designed by Al Lowe, author of the Leisure Suit Larry series.

== Gameplay ==
Starting area of the game

The player interacts with Torin and the in-game environments using a point-and-click interface. Placing the cursor over certain "hot spots" in the environment allows him to move around, examine things and pick up items. There is also an inventory system used to access the items Torin collects during the course of the game. The player can switch to Torin's pet Boogle as well, although he is mainly used to morph into various items. The items he can morph into replace the items in Torin's inventory. Any item can be viewed as a 3-D model by using the item viewer.

The game has a variety of puzzles, from puzzles involving item collection to sliding puzzles. Points are given after solving puzzles. A hint system is included as an in-game feature, and the player can ask for hints after certain time intervals, at the cost of game points. The specific time interval can be set as an in-game option. The hint system can also be turned off entirely.

== Plot ==
The protagonist of the game is Torin, the son of a farming family on the planet of Strata. An evil sorceress named Lycentia (voiced by Christine McMerdo Wallis) captures his family with a magic spell and he embarks on a quest to find her and free his parents.

Torin travels to the "lands below" to worlds beneath the surface of the nested planet, through colossal crystal columns called phenocrysts. These phenocrysts transfer life-giving sunlight—and people—to the lower worlds with erresdy powder. He is aided by a purple dog-like creature called Boogle, who is able to change himself into a variety of shapes. As Torin travels downward, scenes of both his and Lycentia's pasts reveal their true relation as well as Torin learning about his true identity and the true cause for his journey.

=== Cast ===
- Michael Shapiro - Torin, Boogle
- Frank Corrado - Pecand
- Christine Wallis - Lycentia

== Development ==
Torin's Passage was designed to be suitable for children, which surprised many of the fans of its designer, who was known for making rather "adult" games. In an interview Al Lowe stated: "I think many people misunderstood Torin's Passage, however. It was designed for a parent to share with a child, because I wanted a game that Megan (my then 11-year-old daughter) and I could play together." Al Lowe states on his official website that he wrote Torin's Passage in 1994 after seeing the film Mrs. Doubtfire with his daughter. He states that while watching the film, he realized that the audience was laughing in two different pitches: "high little giggles when the kids laughed at the slapstick parts of the film, and deep knowing guffaws when the adults caught something that they knew the kids wouldn't get." Lowe thought, "Why isn't there a computer game that my 9-year-old daughter and I could play that works like that?" Lowe's daughter would take a small role in the development of the game, designing the maze puzzle seen late in the game. The game was intended to be the first in a series of five games but no sequels were made due to market conditions and the departure of Sierra's founder Ken Williams. The second game would have been about Torin marrying Princess Leenah and becoming the king of the Lands Above, the third one would have involved a rebellion against Torin's rule, the fourth game would have centered on Torin's sons fighting for their right to be the heir, and the fifth installment would have focused on Torin's death and his heir assuming the throne.

The game's developers included a variety of easter eggs in the game. Some of the more obvious ones occur near the end of the game. Several characters make cameo appearances at the same time, including Darth Vader, Yoda and Taylor from the original Planet of the Apes film. Hotaru Tomoe, also known as "Sailor Saturn" from Sailor Moon, also makes an appearance. While the other characters were placed in there by the game's background artists, Hotaru was placed in the game by Bryan Wilkinson, an art tech working on the game. There are also various references made to Torin's Passage in a subsequent Al Lowe release, Leisure Suit Larry: Love for Sail!. The final version also contains some unused content. Some members of the development team who worked on Torin's Passage went on to work for notable companies. Lead animator Jim Murphy went on to work for Pixar and lead background artist Bruce Sharp went on to work for Microsoft.

== Reception ==
Reception

Review scores
Publication	Score
Computer Gaming World	3/5
Next Generation	4/5
PC Gamer (US)	79%
PC PowerPlay	5/10
PC Magazine	4/4
PC Games	A−

According to Al Lowe, Torin's Passage was commercially successful, with sales above 200,000 units by early 1999. However, he noted that the game and Freddy Pharkas: Frontier Pharmacist "had a reputation as failures at Sierra". The four sequels Al Lowe had hoped to create for Torin's Passage were subsequently never made.

Reviews for the game were generally positive. A reviewer for Next Generation opined "Al Lowe has tried his hand at something other than the naughty Leisure Suit Larry series and surprisingly enough he's not only crafted an entertaining family-oriented adventure, but one full of depth and character." He praised the story, graphics, and humor, though he criticized that the puzzles are difficult enough that, when played with the whole family as intended, children would be left out when leaving the puzzle-solving to their parents. GameSpot's Jeffrey Adam Young lauded the game as an adventure for players of all ages, although he agreed that younger children and novice adventure game players might find some puzzles too difficult. Young also noted that although the game is child-friendly, some of Lowe's characteristic toilet humour remains in the narrative.

Some reviews were less positive. David Wildgoose of PC PowerPlay described the game as a "bog-standard Sierra adventure" with a "sickeningly sentimental" plot, "slick and sterile" graphics, "awkward, incongruous and often downright silly puzzles", and "absolutely no sense of humour whatsoever". Claire Wood from Adventure Gamers called the game "a promising fairy tale that just never breaks through the wall of mediocrity."
