= Priest (manhwa) =

Manhwa series by Hyung Min-woo

- Cover of Priest vol. 1 (1998), art by Hyung Min-woo

프리스트 RR: Peuriseuteu MR: P'ŭrisŭt'ŭ
- Genre: Action/adventure, weird west
- Author: Hyung Min-woo
- Publisher: Daewon C.I. (South Korea)
- English publisher: Tokyopop (US)
- Other publishers: Tokyopop (Germany); Tokebi (France); Kasen (Poland); Lumus (Brazil); J POP (Italy)
- Original run: 1998–2007
- Volumes: 16

Priest (Korean: 프리스트) is a manhwa (Korean comic) series created by Hyung Min-woo. It fuses the Western genre with supernatural horror and dark fantasy themes and is notable for its unusual, angular art style. An interview with Hyung in Priest: Volume 3 states that the comic was based on the computer game Blood by Monolith Productions, which featured a similar horror-Western aesthetic and undead protagonist. He has also cited the comic as a mishmash of influences from other books, movies and games, elements from a culture that he felt was underground in Korea at the time.

Priest was published in English by Tokyopop. The manhwa was loosely adapted into the 2011 American horror film of the same name.

== Story ==
Priest tells the story of humanity's battle against 12 fallen angels. The angels descended to Earth to 'play God' among humans, who build a temple and statues in their honor. For their rebellion against Him, God destroyed their temple, imprisoned their souls in statues, and buried the statues underground.

Centuries later, a Holy Knight named Vascar De Gullion loses his family. He 'loses faith' and wanders the earth in a 'blood rage'. He discovers a cave containing the statues of the 12 fallen angels. Temozarela convinces Vascar De Gullion to give up his body to the angel to take revenge against God. Vascar De Gullion is discovered by a powerful priest, Betheal. He discovers that Vascar De Gullion is actually Temozarela. Betheal traps their souls within a powerful weapon called the Domas Porada, becoming the demon Belial in the process.

Ivan Isaacs solves the puzzle of the Domas Porada, freeing Temozarela. The angel murders Isaacs' love, Gena, after escaping. Priest follows Ivan Isaacs' quest for revenge against the fallen angel, Temozarela, and his 12 angelic disciples, with assistance from Belial and others.

== Characters ==
=== Main ===
==== Ivan Isaacs ====
The main protagonist of Priest. Ivan lived in an orphanage until Mr. Isaacs, a wealthy farm owner, adopted him after his wife died to be a companion for his daughter. Fond of ancient stories and myths, he spent his time researching in his own library and with Gena Isaacs, whom he eventually falls in love. When Mr. Isaacs finds out, he reprimands Ivan. His father sends him off to a boarding school called Conrad to get him away from Gena. Ivan returns after becoming a priest. An essay he wrote brings him to the attention of an Order of St. Vinetz. They approach him to help unlock the secrets of the Domas Porada, which contains the souls of Temozarela and Belial.

After reading through a book, Ivan finds blood in it and confronts Piestro. He admits his true plan is to let Temozarela free. Temozarela, realizing that Ivan could liberate him, tells Piestro to sacrifice Gena in front of the Domas Porada. During this, Ivan goes into a stupor and attempts to open the Domas Porada. He is transported inside the Domas Porada finding Temozarela imprisoned and Belial standing watch. Belial reprimands Isaac for entering the relic as the archangel breaks free.

Ivan stalks the west as an undead creature sustained solely by his infinite rage; his strength directly related to his anger. He also uses weapons: a Bowie knife he coats with blessed silver, a sawed off shotgun with silver bullets, and a Thompson sub-machine gun.

==== Betheal Gavarre (Belial) ====
Belial was originally an inquisitor in the medieval church called Betheal. He presided over the case of the possessed Vascar de Guillon. Temozarela, possessing Vascar, influences Betheal's adoptive son, Matthew, to slaughter one of the women at the monastery. Temozarela orchestrated this tragedy to shatter Betheal's faith. In remorse and enraged, Betheal sacrifices himself, condemns his faith, renounces God, and becomes the devil Belial. Betheal uses his new power to imprison Temozarela and himself in the Domas Porada. After Temozarela is freed, he melds with Ivan's body to help him defeat the angels.

==== Gena Isaacs ====
The natural daughter of Mister Isaacs, a ranch owner who adopted Ivan. Gena eventually falls in love with Ivan despite being his adoptive sister, but is killed by Temozarela's minions. The Order of St. Vertinez uses her to make Ivan finally snap and release Temozarela. She is killed while calling Ivan's name and dies in his arms. He brings Gena's body back to the ranch. Belial appears and Ivan leaves her to talk with him. At this time, a servant of Temozarela, appears and raises the dead of a nearby graveyard. Ivan sees them and runs into the house for Gena, finding several zombies feeding on her flesh. Gena comes back to life as a zombie. She pleads with him to love her still, but he refuses at Belial's words and stabs her with a scythe. After killing the zombies, he takes her corpse and buries her in a makeshift grave with a cross at the head.

Gena later appears as a visage to Ivan and other characters. Most notably, when Ivan is about to be killed by Achmode. Ivan finally begins to accept death and we see Gena in a field in front of him, before Armandiel saves him. She also appeared as a hallucination to Lizzie, saying nothing and just touching her heart after Lizzie almost succumbs to Temozarela.

==== Coburn ====
Coburn is a cynical atheist and a federal marshal hired by the government to investigate Ivan and Temozarela. He first appears saving Lizzie from being hung as a witch, then subsequently hires her to help him find Isaac. He reveals to Lizzie how he knew her father. During Ivan's battle with Achmode, the group comes across Little Bosack ruined and inhabited by corpses. While Father Lucian stops to pray for the souls, every corpse comes alive and attacks them. Coburn protects the group with two guns and a whip.

Coburn tries to convince the mayor of Windtale that his city is in danger of an attack by Temozarela. His pleas are ignored, and Coburn leaves, remarking 'Either way, this town is doomed'. Coburn reappears when the village is surrounded by members of St. Vertinez who are about to attack. In the fight, he duels with Joshua. Joshua stabs him above the heart, but Coburn withdraws the sword and gives it back to Joshua, saying 'aim a bit higher.'

==== Lizzie ====
Lizzie is the leader of a gang of outlaws. The authorities catches her and places her on a train transporting her to be executed. After the gang massacres most of the train, they try to steal the cargo, but Ivan kills them. She witnesses Ivan's battle with Jarbilong. While watching, a zombie bites her. Jarbilong tried to make Lizzie his disciple, but dies before succeeding. After the battle, Ivan visits her and tells her he will kill her unless she commits suicide before the curse takes control. During her recovery, she asks Ivan for help, but he ignores her, saying 'Why do you ask me questions which God Himself doesn't answer?' She cuts her long hair and recruits a mysterious clan to help her quest against Ivan.

==== Father Lucian ====
The Vatican assigned Father Lucian to Coburn as a religious assistant in his pursuit of Ivan and Temozarela. He is calm and collected, preferring pacifism to violence. When Lizzie catches the plague, he heals her temporarily with holy water and prayer. After they find Ivan Isaacs, he reveals to Coburn that Betheal Gavarre is controlling Ivan. Lucian later appears with Coburn and attempts to persuade the townsfolk of Windtale to allow federal government into their town. When the Order of St. Vertinez surrounds Windtale, Lucian warns the mayor of Windtale about the impending danger. He notices the hanging body of Netraphim and speculates the town is going to Hell.

==== Cairo ====
Cairo is an Indigenous American (possibly of the Apache tribe) traveling with Coburn. He is skilled with knives, and throws them with fatal accuracy. He is an expert tracker sent to locate Ivan Isaacs. Later, he attacks members of St. Vertinez after witnessing them murder a small child from an infected village. He continues fighting before Antione, a member of St. Vertinez, murders and dismembers him. Seeing this, Coburn renounces the Vatican, saying 'From now on, the cross will only be the sign of the enemy to me.'

=== The Fallen Angels ===
==== Temozarela ====
Temozarela is an arch-angel who fought on God's side in the war against Lucifer. This war caused God to lose faith in the angels and begin preferring humanity. A bitter Temozarela took twelve empathetic angels to Earth to prove that humans were more fallible than angels. He set up a cult that worshiped him through ritual sacrifice. This only angered God and he banished Temozarela to the earth, imprisoning him in a statue. Years later, a Knight Templar called Vascar de Guillon fought in the crusades and led fearsome armies. His wife contracted a plague, but the doctors and priests said she was possessed by the devil. As a remedy, they burned de Guillon's castle with his wife and children inside. He discovered a hidden cavern on his "crusades of blood" that imprisoned Temozarela and his disciples. Temozarela explained how he and Vascar were both betrayed by God. In his fury, he gives his body to Temozarela who releases his angels and uses them to possess the Vascar's knights.

100 years later, Temozarela tries to seduce Betheal, but Betheal resists and eventually imprisons both himself and Temozarela in the Domas Porada. Belial and his battle causes Temozarela's body to be horribly burned. His life is saved by four of his Dark Apostles: Netraphim, Jarbilong, Achmode, and Armand.

Temozarela's actions are sometimes contradictory, indicating a deeper wish for Ivan to continue on his pilgrimage. He gives non-lethal powers to Jarbilong and slays Achmode after he eats Ivan's arm. Belial tells Ivan that his quest for blood is Temozarela's bidding, but Ivan ignores him.

==== Jarbilong ====
Jarbilong is one of the twelve Angels who rebelled against God with Temozarela. He was present at Temozarela's release from the Domas Porada, but played little part in the battles with Belial. After this event he turns the townspeople of Saint Baldlas into zombies that attack Ivan. He has the 'gift' of merging his spirit with any of his disciples at will, giving him an inexhaustible supply of bodies. Ivan used Voodoo magic to damage all of Jarbilong's servants by attacking his soul instead of the angel's body. Wounded, the 11th Angel revealed his hideous true form. Jarbilong impales Ivan on one of his arms. Belial possesses Ivan and defeats Jarbilong, eventually impaling the angel on his own blades. In his final moments before dying, Jarbilong tells Ivan that Temozarela could destroy him if he wished, but the angel has plans for him.

==== Achmode ====
The second Fallen Angel to battle Ivan on his pilgrimage, Achmode fancies himself both an artist and a beast. After turning a village into mindless zombies, Achmode creates undead killers and winged monstrosities by mutilating the zombie bodies. His sacred site is Small Bosack.

Ivan is confronted by Achmode's latest modification, Christine, a child deformed into a hawk-like form. Achmode offers Ivan a glimpse of Christine's "dream", that retells the heretical angels' fall. When Ivan kills Christine with the Belial's help, Achmode is further enraged by insults about his 'glorious past' being little more than mindless instinct. Achmode decides to kill Ivan himself, despite Temozarela's orders to the contrary. In their battle, Ivan's best efforts to destroy Achmode fall short, and Belial demands that Ivan turn complete control of his body over to him. Ivan refuses. As Achmode is about to kill Ivan, Armandiel, Temozarela's lieutenant, intervenes. He accuses Achmode of betraying their lord and slays him, saying 'He does not resent your foolish yearning to enter heaven.' In a bizarre twist, Armandiel grants Ivan the severed arm of Achmode to replace his, saying that it will make him more than human and bolster his power.

==== Armand/Armandiel ====
He is possibly the most powerful of the Fallen Angels, especially considering his status of High Priest in Temozarela's Black Sabbath. He is part of the party that rescues a burnt Temozarela from the Domas Porada. He is depicted as a handsome young man with long, straight hair, dressed in 19th century formal wear. In his first appearance, he gives Jarbilong his orders and advises him on how to fight Ivan and Belial. He is later pleased with Jarbilong's defeat. He also is able to distract opponents with roses and the folds of his cape. Even though he is Ivan's ally against Achmode, he later wounds Ivan so badly that Belial is unable to heal him.

==== Netraphim ====
Another of the Fallen Angels, Netraphim resembles a young woman and is accompanied by a giant wolf named Bendo. Against Temozarela's orders, she protects the unfortunate in the valley of Windtale. Her alias is 'Nera.' In heaven, she tried to stop Temozarela from leaving heaven, and had her wings ripped off as punishment. She asked to be killed because she was torn between her love for God and her secret attraction to Temozarela. Her life was spared and she joined Temozarela's angels. While on Earth, she sees the young orphan Dana, and Netraphim decides to repent for her sins.

Armand delivers Temozarela's word to Bendo, saying that Netraphim's defiance will not be punished as long as she does not utter a single word of regret or remorse. If so, he will destroy her. When her "family" is killed, she allows the angry townspeople to hang her. Before she dies, Temozarela visits her and offers her a place by his side, provided she regrets her existence. She refuses and dies.

==== Unnamed Figure ====
This Unnamed Figure is seen during the events of Ivan's fall from grace. Once Gena had been murdered, and the Domas Porada opened, a man arrived swathed in bandages bearing a lantern and a staff tipped with the symbol 'II'. The staff secretes a fluid that releases the zombies. The dead eventually try to devour Gena before Ivan destroys them. After this, the figure's lantern shatters setting fire to the graveyard and the mansion. He walks away prophesying 'Ivan Isaacs, we will meet again one day.' As the 'II' symbol occupies a space on Temozarela's circle (seen often relating to the demise of Jarbilong and Archmode) it is possible this man is another Fallen Angel or servant of Temozarela.

=== The Order of St. Vertinez ===
The Vatican created the Order of St. Vertinez to handle what Coburn describes as 'the vatican's dirty laundry.' Their real name is 'Michael's Sword.' They have the authority to take matters into their own hands without the Pope's knowledge. They are harsh and judgmental, killing anyone who disagrees with them as a service to the Church. Only 4 members are named. Their uniform consists of a white hooded robe with some members wearing masks.

==== Father Raul Piestro ====
Father Piestro was the head priest of Saint Vertinez before Temozarel's release. In his first appearance, he visits Ivan about an essay he submitted on the ideology in the church. Piestro explains that he was part of the investigation into Ivan Isaac after he submitted his paper, revealing that his research findings are absolutely correct, but that he should stop further research to avoid punishment. He asks Ivan to help them solve The Domas Porada. After finding blood in one of the books, Ivan confronts Piestro. The head of St. Vertinez explains how he was visited by Temozarela in a dream and that he believes the archangel brought a new message from God. Afterwards, he kills Gena. When the Domas Porada is opened, Temozarela kills all the members of St. Vertinez, before killing Piestro and remarking, 'Did you not ask to be rid of sin or desire?'

==== Father Joshua ====
One of possible current leaders of St. Vertinez, Joshua was recruited by Father Raul Piestro in an asylum. The asylum was run by Doctor Gerard, who St. Vertinez commissioned to create a new super-soldier. Joshua was one of only 3 who survived the process. He increased membership in the Order to reinforce his army against the heretics. He first appears praying at a ruined shrine with another priest, Antoine. Later, he takes part in wiping out an entire village that was infected by Temozarela's plague with other priests. Joshua is indifferent when his comrades die, remarking only 'Presume them martyrs'.

==== Father Antoine ====
Another possible leader of St. Vertinez, this priest has a marine-style haircut and has a hook instead of a left hand. During the experiments with Dr. Gerard, the drugs deformed his left hand rendering it useless. He cut it off and replaced it with an artificial device that could attach various implements for his use. He was held in the same asylum as Joshua and Baston before Piestro recruited him. The asylum's experiments gave him super-regenerative capabilities. He first appears praying with Father Joshua, and helps him fight Cairo.

==== Brother Baston ====
Piestro recruited Baston from the same asylum as the others. He is the strongest of the surviving priests, surpassing all of the tests given to him by Doctor Gerard. From the experiments he gained heightened senses and super physical strength, presumably along with regeneration.

== Volume list ==
The Graphic novels have been out of print since Tokyo Pop ceased business, however, now that they have resumed parts of business the books are available for digital download on amazon.com.

No.	American release date	American ISBN
01	July 2002	1-59182-008-1
There is going to be a hanging in the frontier town of St. Baldlas. The leader of the infamous Angel Gang has finally been brought to justice, and the marshals want to hang her high. But before they can string her up they must first put her on the earliest available train to get her to St. Baldlas. Of course, her gang is not about to lose their leader without a fight. The deadly Kacho and a half-dozen other thugs take over the train, but they are about to find out that there is more on this train than just marshals. When the first drop of blood spills they open the gates to Hell and a shipment of zombies is unleashed. The only one capable of stopping the undead threat is Ivan Isaacs, a mysterious priest with an arsenal of weapons for fighting the ghouls.
02	September 2002	1-59182-009-X
Welcome to Saint Baldlas. Population: dwindling. This frontier town is one of the 12 sacred sites that seal the fallen archangel Temozarela in darkness. Now the seal is about to be broken. Demonic preacher Jarbilong has made Saint Baldlas his home, and has desecrated the land and poisoned the citizens in preparation for his master's return. The only man who has the power to stop him is Ivan Isaacs, a priest who sold his soul to the devil Belial for the power to fight Temozarela. When Ivan comes to town at high noon, heads will roll.
03	November 2002	1-59182-010-3
While railroad men and pioneer families expand into the frontier of the old west, a secret war is being waged between two factions: the followers of Temozarela, an angel of blood fallen from Heaven, and those who stand against the darkness he represents. Temozarela's cult spreads plague in its wake as it attempts to pave the way for its master. The agents of righteousness face the scorn of Christians and heathens alike in their secret mission. And somewhere in between stands Ivan Isaacs, a priest who sold his soul to the devil Belial for the power to fight the darkness. Both sides need him to reach their goals, but Ivan has plans of his own.
04	January 2003	1-59182-088-X
Before Ivan Isaacs became the undead pilgrim who battles Temozarela's forces, he was just a mortal man with the usual human failings. Orphaned at an early age, Ivan was adopted by Jacob Isaacs, a wealthy frontiersman who wanted his only daughter, Jenna, to have a companion. In the solitude of the Isaacs' homestead, the two siblings developed stronger feelings than their father or society would allow. To escape from his desire, Ivan entered seminary, where he found a new interest: the study of ancient religions. Nine years later, Father Ivan Isaacs is still haunted by memories of his true love. But a new figure has begun appearing in his dreams – a knight Templar, a holy defender of the crusades. Now Ivan stands at a crossroads. One path leads to ancient demons, the other to a forbidden love. Whichever path he chooses will certainly lead to damnation.
05	March 2003	1-59182-201-7
Vascar De Guillon was once willing to give his life for the cross serving as a knight in the crusades. His faith was shattered after he lost his wife and children to plague. Consumed by rage, he made a pact with the fallen archangel Temozarela, becoming his agent in the mortal world and slaughtering countless innocents. When De Guillon is brought to trial for his sins, the church sends their top priest to serve as prosecutor – Belial Gabarre. The prosecutor finds himself the defendant when De Guillon uses any means at his unholy disposal in his attempt to corrupt Belial's faith.
06	May 2003	1-59182-202-5
Belial Gabarre thought his faith was unbreakable. He was wrong. Everyone has a breaking point. When an agent of Temozarela corrupts Belial's own son, he loses faith, but rather than join Temozarela, he gives his soul to the Lord of Darkness himself in order to fight Temozarela. Belial creates Domas Poradas, a prison in which he binds himself and Temozarela for eternity – or so he hoped. Hundreds of years later Domas Poradas is discovered ... and a Pandora's box is opened in America's Old West.
07	July 2003	1-59182-203-3
With the Domas Poradas opened, the spirit of Temozarela has escaped, but the fallen angel is too weak to survive alone. Drawn to his cries, his followers arrive to spirit him to safety, leaving the young priest Ivan Isaacs in the unholy prison in Temozarela's place. In order to escape his prison and avenge his beloveds death, Ivan must make an unholy pact that will change his destiny forever.
08	September 2003	1-59182-204-1
Everybody wants a piece of Ivan Isaacs. The agents of the fallen angel Temozarela want to destroy him. The law has a bounty on his head, not knowing that no mortal man could hope to take it. The one who needs Ivan most of all is Coburn, a US Marshal who leads a team in an investigation of the recent string of 'unusual' incidents around the Southwest. His only lead to finding Ivan is Lizzie, former leader of the Rebel Angels and the only surviving Witness of the St. Baldlas Massacre. Lizzie needs Ivan too ... he might be the only one who can help her cure the plague she contracted from her encounter with Temozarela's agents.
09	December 2003	1-59182-205-X
Ivan Isaacs continues his bloody march toward a showdown with Achmode. Under Achmode's panoptic gaze and influence, the townspeople have turned into walking zombies feasting on one another's bodies. After fighting through an army of deformed creatures, Ivan finally stands face to face with Akmode ...
10	January 2004	1-59182-511-3
Despite being locked in mortal combat with Achmode, Ivan, resists the temptations of Belial to the end. He would rather die than give up his will, his ability to choose, completely. Temozarela finally intervenes – and his messenger informs all that Ivan's pilgrimage is far from over. After all this, Lizzie and Ivan have a nasty encounter with Coburn and gang ...
11	April 2004	1-59182-512-1
Federal marshal Coburn and his team aren't the only ones tracking Ivan and Temozarela. The order of St. Vertinez, the Vatican's secret branch for taking care of the church's "dirty laundry," has been sent to the West to take care of the "incident" at Stonetale Abbey and its aftermath. Meanwhile, Lizzie has escaped from the marshal's custody and has settled in with a new band of outlaws.
12	July 2004	1-59182-513-X
Though the baptism of blood continues, one last sanctuary for the afflicted remains. Nera, the guardian saint of Windtale, will not remain silent as a sheep before slaughter when evil moves in on her beloved flock. With her resurrected wolf Bendo, she will bear fangs against Ivan Isaacs, Temozarela or anyone else who threatens their way of life.
13	November 2004	1-59182-514-8
Eons ago the angel Netraphim was commanded to guard the final gate of heaven. However, this faithful guardian could not prevent Temozarela from proceeding down the path of dissension and war upon man. Now as the bloodiest power struggle ever ignited rides in on the coattails of Ivan Isaacs, will the guardian of Windtale be able to protect this last outpost of outcasts?
14	January 2005	1-59182-515-6
In his unyielding battle to quench a thirst for vengeance, Ivan Isaac must now do a twisted tango with his most tantalizing opponent yet: Armand, Temozarela's right-hand angel. As the battle intensifies between the two, Ivan takes a vicious beating and becomes impaled on Armand's sword. But the blow only seems to add fuel Ivan's burning desire for revenge—he is looking for a little payback, and will kill anybody who crosses his path!
15	October 2006	1-59182-516-4
At last, the dark saga of Priest continues! Death has come to Windtale, the corrupt town of farmers and freaks. As Ivan wrestles with his demons, the citizens of Windtale are haunted by a more human horror...
16	April 2007	1-4278-0162-2
As the deadly massacre by the Order of St. Vertinez rushes on in extreme fury, Dudley charges all villagers to defend Windtale with their lives. But is it already too late for them to escape the wrath of the Order? Vengeance may taste sweet, but it will be Coburn who must take a sip if the residents of Windtale are to escape with their lives...and souls.

== In other media ==
=== MMO game ===
A massively multiplayer online game based on the comic was in production by South Korean developer JC Entertainment back in 2003, but was later cancelled following being renamed Rust Online. Appropriately given the comic's inspiration, the game attempted to meld in elements of first-person shooters; combat was real time and aiming and movement directly controlled by the player. Successful attacks brought players more experience points. The game featured two factions: Heretics, who side with Temozarela, and Templars who are more aligned with Ivan Isaacs. Players were then further divided into four weapons classes (leader, fighter, distance weapon and mage), with both demonic and spiritual abilities. Set among 48 different environments in New Mexico (including ghost towns, mines and desserts), factions would fight for control of twelve "sacred sites" which provide bonuses to the possessing faction. The conflict to control each of the counties containing these sites formed the basis of the main faction vs. faction mode. Other modes included single player and player vs. player. JC Entertainment described the game as controversial, owing to its graphic violence and religious mysticism. The game received extensive previews from The Adrenaline Vault and IGN's RPG Vault.

=== Film adaptation ===
Priest is a 2011 action horror film loosely based on the manhwa, although the director claimed it was set in the comic's far future. It is directed by Scott Stewart and stars Paul Bettany as the title character. The film was released on May 13, 2011, in 2D and 3D. A prequel comic, Priest: Purgatory, was begun in an attempt to bridge the original manhwa with the movie, although it was never completed. Min Woo Hyung was largely supportive of the movie, praising the visuals, even if missing the comic's philosophical aspects.

== Cultural influence ==
The progressive metal band Dream Theater's song "In the Presence of Enemies" features a storyline patterned after Priest's plot with lyrics directly quoting the official English translation of Volume 1. A character called Priest also appears in the brawler game Lost Saga by South Korean developer I.O. Entertainment. It has also been regularly cited as an example for manhwa to Western audiences, as well as analysed for its religious content and cultural connections.

== See also ==
- Blood, the primary influence on Priest
- Science fiction Western
- "In the Presence of Enemies", a song by progressive metal band Dream Theater about Priest Volume 1.
