= Blood (video game) =

1997 video game

- Developers: Monolith Productions; Nightdive Studios (remaster)
- Publishers: GT Interactive; Eidos Interactive (Europe); Atari (remaster); Warner Bros. Games (Refreshed Supply)
- Director: Nick Newhard
- Producer: Matt Saettler
- Programmers: Peter Freese; Nick Newhard; Dan Leeks; Matt Saettler
- Artist: Kevin Kilstrom
- Composers: Daniel Bernstein; Guy Whitmore
- Engine: Build; KEX Engine (remaster)
- Platforms: MS-DOS, Windows, PlayStation 4, PlayStation 5, Xbox One, Xbox Series X/S, Nintendo Switch, Nintendo Switch 2
- Release: NA: March 7, 1997 (Shareware); NA: May 21, 1997 (Registered); EU: June 20, 1997; NA: July 15, 1998 (One Unit Whole Blood); Fresh Supply: WW: May 9, 2019; Refreshed Supply: WW: December 4, 2025; WW: May 7, 2026 (Switch 2)
- Genre: First-person shooter
- Modes: Single-player, multiplayer

Blood is a 1997 first-person shooter game developed by Monolith Productions using the Build engine and published by GT Interactive. The shareware version was released for MS-DOS on March 7, 1997, while the full version was later released on May 21 in North America and June 20 in Europe.

The game follows the story of Caleb, an undead early 20th century gunslinger seeking revenge against the demon Tchernobog. It features a number of occult and horror themes. Blood includes large amounts of graphic violence, a large arsenal of weapons ranging from the standard to the bizarre, and numerous enemies and bosses.

Blood received largely positive reviews from critics upon release, with many praising its creative level design, humor (particularly its use of pop-culture references), atmosphere, and gameplay, though some criticism was aimed at the game's difficulty. It has since garnered a cult following and is now considered one of the best games on the Build engine.

The Blood franchise was continued with two official expansion packs titled Plasma Pak (developed by Monolith) and Cryptic Passage (developed by Sunstorm Interactive). A sequel titled Blood II: The Chosen was released in 1998. Blood also served as the principal inspiration for the manhwa series Priest. The game was released on GOG.com along with its two expansion packs on April 22, 2010, utilizing the DOSBox emulator to run on modern systems, and on Steam on July 14, 2014. A remaster of the game made to run better on modern systems entitled Blood: Fresh Supply was released on May 9, 2019, by Nightdive Studios and Atari. Nightdive released a port of Fresh Supply to modern consoles, titled Blood: Refreshed Supply, on December 4, 2025.

== Gameplay ==
In single-player mode, the player takes the role of Caleb in his quest for revenge against his former master by navigating levels in episodes, looking for an exit, until the boss level.

Blood's gameplay is similar to other classic FPS games like Doom: the player must activate switches or seek keys to go through the levels; some larger maps contain up to six different keys. Features include teleporters, traps such as crushing blocks, explosive barrels, lava pits, jumping puzzles, and combination lock doors.

Blood is one of the earliest FPS games to feature alternate or secondary attack modes for its weapons. Weapons include a flare gun, voodoo doll, and an aerosol canister that can be used as a flamethrower. It also features a power-up known as "Guns Akimbo", which allows the player to dual wield certain weapons temporarily. Blood also has "super secret" areas which contain rewards for discovering them.

Enemies include human members of the Cabal and creatures fighting for the demon Tchernobog. Enemies can use objects in the environment for cover. The game also features a lesser class of enemies (bats, rats, eels, possessed hands, etc.) often referred to as "nuisance enemies" that are not considered threats individually, but can be deadly in large numbers.

Blood, like many FPS games of the time, features multiplayer modes. When it was released, Internet play was not well established, so Blood used modem, LAN, or serial cable connections for multiplayer. Modem and serial cable connections only allow two player games, while an IPX network connection can support up to eight players. This can easily be achieved on a variety of platforms that support DOSBox and its IPX modes, coupled with VPN software such as Hamachi. Online multiplayer was also possible via the Total Entertainment Network and DWANGO.

The multiplayer modes consist of deathmatch, known in Blood as "Bloodbath", and cooperative play. Bloodbath matches can be played on specifically designed multiplayer maps or on the levels of the various episodes; the "frag limit" or "time limit" options are available to end matches, as well as the possibility to control respawn mode for weapons and power-ups. A feature of Bloodbath is "The Voice", an audio comment heard upon each frag, that punctuates the death of an opponent often in gory and irreverent terms. "The Voice" is that of Jace Hall, who was CEO of Monolith Productions at the time. Cooperative gameplay follows the lines of the single player campaign, allowing several players to work together in the levels of the different episodes.

== Plot ==
Blood takes place in an unspecified time period. The various levels contain elements from the 1920s, 1930s, and 1940s, in addition to futuristic and retro-futuristic technologies and a weird West theme. Many elements are anachronistic, including weapons and pop-culture references. The sequel, Blood II: The Chosen, retroactively dates the game to the year 1928.

The backstory is not delineated in the game itself, only on the Monolith website and a readme text document. The player takes on the role of Caleb, once the supreme commander of a cult called "The Cabal", followers of the forgotten demon Tchernobog. Known as a merciless gunfighter in the late 19th century American West, Caleb joined the Cabal in 1871 after meeting Ophelia Price, a woman whose husband and son may have been murdered by the members of the Cabal; it is implied that she later became Caleb's lover. Together they rose to the highest circle of the dark cult, "The Chosen", until all four members of The Chosen were betrayed and killed by Tchernobog for unspecified failures. Several years later, Caleb rises from his grave, seeking answers and vengeance.

In search of the gargoyle Cheogh, one of Tchernobog's minions, Caleb moves to the rail yard and station, where he boards the northbound "Phantom Express". He fights off the undead which swarm the train, finally stopping the train by blowing up the locomotive. Emerging from the wreckage, cutting through swarms of Cabal loyalists and other creatures, Caleb enters the "Great Temple". A teleporter in the temple leads Caleb to Cheogh's altar, where he finds Ophelia crucified, and he fights and slays Cheogh. Caleb finishes by lighting up Ophelia's funeral pyre to cremate her body.

The player confronts Cerberus (left) and Tchernobog.

Caleb heads to the Arctic north on a large icebound wooden sailing ship. He disembarks at a lumber mill the Cabal has transformed into a crude human remains processing area. He makes his way into a mine in search of the mother spider Shial's lair. Navigating the Cabal infested tunnels, Caleb finds a dark stony cavern where he defeats Shial, crushing her with a stomp of his boot. He then rips out and consumes the heart of the webbed corpse of Gabriel, another of the betrayed Chosen, thus gaining the power of his fallen comrade.

Cerberus is promoted to Tchernobog's second in command. Caleb moves across an industrial facility, entering a nearby dam control installation located near Cerberus' cavern, then blows up the dam with explosives. The resulting flood makes Cerberus' hideout accessible. Caleb kills Cerberus, and upon finding no trace of Ishmael, fills Cerberus' stomach with bundles of TNT, and blows up the corpse.

Caleb heads for the "Hall of the Epiphany" where Tchernobog is waiting. There, before facing him, Caleb learns why "The Chosen" were cast down: Tchernobog knew Caleb would return to him, killing anyone he ran into to take his revenge and thus gaining immense power, something Tchernobog wants for himself. Caleb battles and destroys the demon. One of Tchernobog's followers approaches Caleb and declares him their new leader. Caleb shoots him and leaves the Hall of Epiphany.

== Expansion packs ==
The first episode of Blood was released as shareware. The full retail version of Blood was released on a CD-ROM, featuring all four original episodes and all of the elements that were missing in the shareware version. The extremely violent content of the game later prompted the release of a censored version of Blood with toned-down violence. Two official expansions were released for the game. Cryptic Passage was developed by Sunstorm Interactive and features a new 10 level episode for single player and four new multiplayer levels. Monolith's official add-on for Blood is called the Plasma Pak and contains 11 new levels, new enemies, and weapons modes. A special edition collection titled One Unit Whole Blood was released on July 15, 1998, including the fully patched versions of Blood, Cryptic Passage, and the Plasma Pak, as well as the Blood: Unlock the Secrets guide in a single package. Strategy guides for the game were also published, namely Blood: The Official Strategy Guide and Blood: Unlock the Secrets.

=== Cryptic Passage ===
Cryptic Passage was published by Sunstorm Interactive and is the only officially authorized commercially available add-on for Blood that was not created by Monolith. It was released on June 30, 1997, and contains 10 new single player levels and four new multiplayer Bloodbath levels.

In the episode's new story, having heard news of an ancient scroll, Caleb sets out to retrieve it for his own dark needs.

=== Plasma Pak ===
Released in September 1997, the Plasma Pak expansion adds several new features to Blood; a new episode with nine single player levels titled "Post Mortem" is included, along with two new multiplayer Bloodbath levels, one of which was modeled after Monolith's corporate offices, for a total of 11 levels. New enemies are included in the Plasma Pak, and all of them are featured in the extra episode; the new creatures include two new Cabal loyalist types, Chrysallid pods, miniature Calebs, and a new boss, the Beast. There are no new weapons added to Caleb's arsenal, though some new weapon abilities are introduced; the Tesla Cannon can now be wielded akimbo (provided the appropriate power-up is collected), while the Napalm Cannon and Life Leech have new secondary attacks. The Plasma Pak also integrated a large number of bug fixes which had been previously addressed by several patches.

Episode 5: Post Mortem

After Caleb learns the Cabal is training replacements for the fallen Chosen, he sets out to stop the cult's plans. Caleb moves into Cabal territory, wreaking havoc in a temple complex, then storming the inner temple. Satisfied the temples have been dealt with, Caleb enters the training ground for "The Chosen". In order to rest, Caleb destroys each of the four "Chosen" in training and the Beasts within them.

== Development ==
Development began at Q Studios, an independent developer funded by 3D Realms, in parallel with a number of other well-known titles. It started development in 1995. Following the success of Duke Nukem 3D, development progress was made public starting in June 1996 with weekly updates on their website. It was originally scheduled for release in early 1997. Q Studios was acquired by Monolith in November 1996. On January 22, 1997, all rights had been sold to Monolith so that 3D Realms could focus efforts on Shadow Warrior, another Build engine game slated for release the same year. Ports for the PlayStation and Sega Saturn were planned but never completed.

Blood was one of two games (the other being Shadow Warrior) that took advantage of the Build engine's support for voxel objects in the game world. Blood used this for weapon and ammo pickups, power-ups, and occasionally decorations, such as the tombstones in the first level of episode one, "Cradle to Grave". The Build engine was enhanced for Blood to allow new lighting effects, real-time shadows, and simulated "rooms above rooms".

A central feature of Blood is an abundant (and often exaggerated) graphic violence, from which the game derives its name. Enemies can be blown to pieces, and the pieces often rain down on the player. Zombies' heads can be shot off and then kicked around like footballs, spewing fountains of blood. Enemies scream if set on fire or are otherwise injured, making sound an integral part of the violent atmosphere of Blood. The levels themselves are designed with the same spirit, as corpses, torture victims, and several grotesque situations are witnessed in the game. Collectively, these features caused some public concern about Blood, leading to a censored re-release of the game.

== Intellectual property ownership ==
3D Realms sold Monolith the intellectual property (IP) so 3D Realms could make Shadow Warrior. Monolith sold the publishing rights, but not the IP for Blood and its sequel to GT Interactive. GT Interactive was later acquired by Infogrames, which has since been renamed to Atari. Monolith itself was acquired by Warner Bros., which owns the Blood trademark and intellectual property. Atari re-released Blood and Blood 2 on Steam and GOG, but unlike other Build engine games (Duke Nukem 3D and Shadow Warrior), the source code for Blood has not officially been released, however multiple incomplete versions of it exist online.

== Fresh Supply and Refreshed Supply ==
Nightdive Studios was commissioned by Atari to create an enhanced version of Blood. It was released exclusively for Windows on May 9, 2019, under the title Blood: Fresh Supply. The new version featured compatibility with modern operating systems and native support for monitor resolutions up to 4K, anti-aliasing, ambient occlusion and interpolation among other improvements.

A newer version of Fresh Supply, also developed by Nightdive Studios, got more quality of life features as well the integration of the mod scenario Marrow, with the scenario Death Wish in a later update. It was released for Windows, Nintendo Switch, PlayStation 4, PlayStation 5, Xbox One and Xbox Series X/S on December 4, 2025. A Nintendo Switch 2 port was released on May 7, 2026.

== Reception ==
Reception

Aggregate score
Aggregator	Score
Metacritic	82/100

Review scores
Publication	Score
GamePro	4/5
GameSpot	8/10
Next Generation	4/5
PC PowerPlay	71%

Blood received "generally favorable" reviews from professional critics, according to review aggregator website Metacritic based on seven reviews. Critics especially praised the intricate and creative level designs, humorous wisecracks and pop culture references, over-the-top gore, variety of settings, and inventive, unconventional weaponry. GameSpot particularly noted that the voodoo doll "might be the coolest little accessory to ever grace the weapons belt of a first-person killing machine".

A few criticisms were voiced about the game, but did not find consensus among reviewers. For example, while GameSpot said the game "is just too damn hard", citing how quickly enemies can deal damage, Next Generation asserted that "the game is lengthy without being too tedious, and challenging without being too difficult". GamePro followed up its own criticisms by concluding: "Blood's flaws are easily swept aside when your guns start blasting and the bodies start falling".

GamingOnLinux reviewer Hamish Paul Wilson decided in a 2015 retrospective that Blood was easily the best of the three major Build engine games, stating that Blood was "one of the most underrated shooters of the whole decade. Blood arguably built more on the legacy of Duke Nukem 3D than Shadow Warrior did, taking its gameplay to sophisticated new heights and offering its referential overtones with an even greater degree of refinement". Player Attack described Blood in a 2011 article as "the best of the Build engine games after Duke Nukem 3D, with its combination of scary atmosphere, great level design and challenging gameplay putting it above the rest".

More than 350,000 copies of Blood have been downloaded. This number reached one million in its first six months of release. By 1998, the game sold 120,000 copies worldwide.

== Legacy ==
Blood has received numerous fan homages and remakes, including Transfusion, ZBlood, BloodCM, and The Flesh Game, as well as community produced source ports such as BloodGDX, NBlood and Raze, and mods for other games such as the Bloom mod made for GZDoom. The game has also inspired several later boomer shooters such as Eternal Damnation, Viscerafest, Dread Templar, Coven, Nightmare Reaper, Project Warlock, Dusk, and most notably Cultic. It was also influential on the roguelike game Infra Arcana.

The manhwa series Priest created by Hyung Min-woo was inspired by Blood. An interview with Hyung in Priest, Vol. 3: Requiem for the Damned states that the comic was influenced by the game, which featured a similar horror-Western aesthetic and undead protagonist. The manhwa was adapted into the 2011 American horror film of the same name.

The 2014 horror film FPS: First Person Shooter features Stephan Weyte, the actor who played Caleb, as the voice of the protagonist.
