= Josh Wingate =

American actor

Josh Wingate is an American actor most recently known for his recurring role as Roland on Showtime's hit series Let the Right One In (2022) starring Demián Bichir, Kevin Carroll, Nick Stahl, and Grace Gummer.

Wingate had guest-starring and recurring roles on prime-time series like FX's Justified (2010), Sons of Anarchy (2008) as Harlan Hodges, AMC's Fear the Walking Dead (2015), ABC's The Rookie (2018) as Caine, Castle (2009) as Greg Page, and Showtime's Dexter (2006) as a paramedic.

Wingate portrayed Carter on the ABC daytime series General Hospital. His story line made history as the first time a soap opera had addressed the taboo topic of male survivors of sexual violence. In 2011, Wingate won a TV Guide Canada Soap Opera Spirit Award nomination for Outstanding Male Actor in a Recurring Role.

Wingate has also guest starred in other notable roles on several other prime-time series including: CSI: NY (2000) as Clay Miller, Crossing Jordan (2001) as Trent Willows, Medium (2005) as NA Attendee, How I Met Your Mother (2005) as Mike, The Unit (2006) as Marine Sergeant, Moonlight (2007) as 20-year old Lee Spalding, FlashForward (2009) as Guard, Teen Wolf (2011) as Fahey, Chicago P.D. (2014) as Tyler Jerome Hansen and Lethal Weapon (2016) as Duke Rawlings.

On the big screen, Wingate has appeared opposite Paul Bettany in Scott Stewart's Priest (2011), alongside Brad Pitt in director Marc Forster's World War Z, (2013), starred as the lead role in Inverse (2014) as both Arquin and Max Gilchrist, and most recently starred across Trevor St. John in A Good Enough Day (2022).

Wingate was amongst the cast, including Sterling K. Brown and Michael McKean, in the West Coast premiere of Pulitzer Prize winner Suzan-Lori Parks' Father Comes Home From the Wars (Parts 1, 2 & 3) at the Mark Taper Forum in Los Angeles.

Raised just south of Boston in Quincy, Massachusetts, Wingate started acting at age 15, performing in several local and regional productions, before moving to Los Angeles as a young adult to pursue acting.
