= AnnaTommy =

1995 video game

- Developer: Viridis Corporation
- Platform: Windows
- Release: 1995
- Genres: Educational, arcade
- Mode: Single-player

AnnaTommy is a 1995 education game developed by Viridis Corporation and published by IVI Publishing for Windows. Upon release, it received negative reviews.

== Gameplay ==
Players assist Anna and Tommy after they have been shrunk into a ship that can navigate ten systems around the human body. Players complete shoot 'em up games in each location based on the system they are in: such as shooting bad enzymes in the pancreas, or guiding sperm in the testes. They also complete quizzes about the functions of the systems they are visiting, and complete arcade-style minigames resembling Breakout and Asteroids.

== Development ==
The game was created using an authoring system called CyberCad, and used early 3D software Infini-D.

== Reception ==
Reception

Review scores
Publication	Score
CD-ROM Today	2.5/5
CD-ROM Magazine	2.5/5
PC Computing Magazine	1/5

AnnaTommy received negative reviews upon release. CD-ROM Magazine appreciated its attempts to be entertaining and humorous, but found its humour "lame", the games "not very good", and some of the minigames to feature little relationship to how systems in the human body work. Describing AnnaTommy as a "dull program" and "boring and repetitive", CD-ROM Today enjoyed the game's animation sequences for featuring "bright colors and sharp graphics", but felt the game was not educational or entertaining as it lacked lesssons and were restrictive. PC Computing critiqued the game as "crudely animated and exasperating to navigate". NY Daily News deemed it "a nicely done CD rip-off of the old "Incredible Journey" movie". The Los Angeles Times felt it was "reminiscent of some ‘60s sci-fi flicks" and that its educational content came across as an afterthought detached from the gameplay.
