= Staples Easy Button =

Advertising campaign and toy

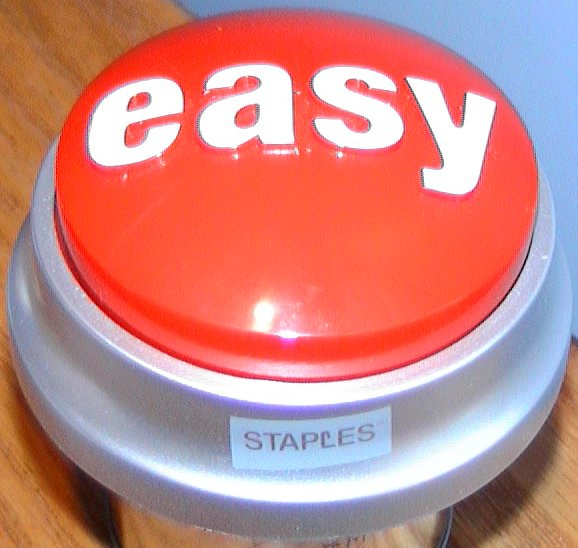
- Type: Push-button
- Inception: 2005; 21 years ago
- Manufacturer: Staples Inc.
- Available: Yes
- Slogan: "That was easy"

The Staples Easy Button is an advertising campaign and push-button office toy by American office supply retailing company Staples. The button serves as "an almost magical ability for the retailer to solve all their shoppers' problems instantly".

== History ==
In January 2005, Staples Inc. began their "Easy Button" advertising campaign with "Easy Button Launch," a 30-second commercial that, due to receiving "such a tremendous response," led the company to show the commercial during Super Bowl XXXIX. The commercial features a series of people in tough situations pressing a red "Easy Button" to rescue them, closing with a narration: "Wouldn't it be nice if there was an easy button for life? Now there's one for your business. Staples. That was easy." Due to the popularity of the advertisements, Staples began selling physical replicas of the Easy Button in October 2005. The button had over one million units sold in less than a year.

== Design ==
The Staples Easy Button is a red plastic push-button device with the word "easy" printed white on the top. When pressed, it plays the audio phrase "That was easy".
