= Blood II: The Chosen =

1998 video game

- Developer: Monolith Productions
- Publisher: GT Interactive
- Producer: Karen Burger
- Designer: Jay Wilson
- Programmer: Greg Kettell
- Artist: Kevin Kilstrom
- Writer: Jay Wilson
- Composers: Guy Whitmore; Daniel Bernstein; Matt Allen
- Engine: LithTech
- Platform: Microsoft Windows
- Release: NA: November 25, 1998; EU: 1998
- Genre: First-person shooter
- Modes: Single-player, multiplayer

Blood II: The Chosen is a 1998 first-person shooter game developed by Monolith Productions and distributed by GT Interactive. Unlike the first installment, Blood, which was set in 1928, it takes place in the year 2028, so in addition to conventional weapons and magical items also incorporates science fiction technology, mostly falling under the cyberpunk genre, and elements of dystopian fiction. Much like its predecessor, the game contains a significant amount of graphic violence and black humor.

== Gameplay ==
Screenshot of the gameplay

=== Single-player ===
In single player mode the player can choose their character from among the four Chosen. Blood II's gameplay is influenced by the choice of character at the start of the game because every Chosen has different marksmanship abilities, amount of maximum hit point and armor level, however the story mode can only be completed by playing as Caleb.

The game is divided into chapters, each of which accessible once the previous one is completed. A total of 17 weapons (some of them usable in dual mode) are available to the player, although there are only 10 weapon slots, forcing the player to choose which weapons will be included in their arsenal. Most weapons also have a secondary fire mode. For example, one mode deals higher damage to hostile creatures but consumes more ammunition. Several power ups including invulnerability, stealth movement, or increased firepower give the player an advantage over enemies for a limited period of time.

=== Multiplayer ===
Blood II is primarily focused on the single player experience, but also features a multiplayer mode. Instead of Deathmatch mode, authors decided to change the name to "Bloodbath" because it better reflects the game's title. Each player can choose one of the four Chosen to control during the match – Caleb, Gabriella, Ishmael and Ophelia. Since every character has different abilities, the weaponry they receive at the beginning of the game varies. Players can also customize their characters, giving a score from 1 to 5 to four different stats.

== Plot ==
=== The Chosen ===
The game takes place in 2028. Caleb, the protagonist, has spent the last century since Blood searching for a way to resurrect his comrades, The Chosen, who were killed in the previous game by the Cabal, a cult dedicated to the worship of the demon, Tchernobog. The Cabal, in the meantime, has spent the century since Tchernobog's death by Caleb's hands turning the cult into a global mega-corporation called CabalCo, which uses its economic influence to control the world's populace. This is all thanks to Gideon, the Cabal's current leader who has been raised to restore Tchernobog and destroy Caleb, now called the "Great Betrayer".

The game begins with Caleb riding a CabalCo subway train, where he discovers that Gideon is the one driving, after Gideon orders his troops to attack. Ready for a fight, Caleb pursues him through the train, which Gideon rigs to crash before escaping. After he regains consciousness, Caleb continues to chase Gideon through the city of New Town, leading to a few short encounters. He later catches up to Gideon in a CabalCo-owned museum, but before they fight, Gideon's bodyguard fires an experimental weapon creating a dimensional rift. Failing to harm Caleb, it instead brings back Gabriella, one of The Chosen, prompting Gideon and his companions to retreat.

From this point on, Caleb begins encountering strange creatures and people infested with strange mind-controlling parasites as he continues to hunt Gideon; fighting through CabalCo housing, steam tunnels, disease laboratories, and an air ship, before heading off to a Cabal controlled cathedral. Gideon is nowhere to be found and he is instead met with a giant of the creatures called the Naga, which Caleb defeats. Gabriella comes up from nearby subway tracks and probes Caleb about the creatures; Caleb has no good answer, and Gabriella expresses her doubts over Caleb's ability to handle this problem. Caleb tersely reassures her, and runs off to catch a train, which again crashes.

Caleb returns to his goal of killing Gideon, ignoring the creature problem, other than killing any encountered. After cornering Gideon in a CabalCo safe house, he is unexpectedly joined by Ishmael, another of The Chosen, after Gideon's bodyguard uses his weapon again. Gideon and his companions again escape, this time in a helicopter. After talking with Ishmael, Caleb fights his way through many CabalCo-owned institutions such as sewage and meat treatment plants and dams, as well as fighting through the subway system many times trying to get to the old underground.

Once there, he fights off a beast called a Behemoth and meets Ishmael again. During both encounters, Ishmael explains that the creatures are the inhabitants of an invading parallel universe, entering that world through tears in reality left by the death of Tchernobog, who maintained the walls separating realities, which have finally broken down due to the Cabal's experiments. Only Caleb can stop the invasion from consuming our world, as he inherited Tchernobog's power after killing the demon. Caleb shrugs off Ishmael's concerns, not accepting his powers, and returns to hunting Gideon.

Just before he leaves, Ishmael explains the whereabouts of Ophelia – the final Chosen and Caleb's lover; she is at CabalCo headquarters in Gideon's temple, the epicentre of the rifts. Caleb proceeds there, and, after dealing with several Cabal-created obstructions such as a raised bridge, finds Ophelia. Gideon returns and carries Ophelia away before Caleb can rescue her. Angered, Caleb blasts his way through CabalCo's offices, electrical generation areas, CabalCo's R&D lab, and finally finds Gideon on the rooftops. After Caleb defeats Gideon, with Ophelia freed, Gideon retreats through a dimensional rift. Against Ophelia's advice, Caleb follows him through.

Caleb finds Gideon in an ancient temple, part of a large strange citadel, and faces his spider version. With Gideon dead, Caleb fights many of the otherworldly beings until he encounters three undead forms of his comrades. They introduce themselves as The Ancient One, the leader of the invasion. After clumsily explaining their plans, Caleb faces them, before falling and finding the being's true form. After defeating the squid-like creature, the real Chosen appear. Grudgingly, Caleb gives in to their wishes and re-binds the realities, and the four Chosen begin their long walk home.

=== The Nightmare Levels ===
The Nightmare Levels, released in August 1999, was an expansion pack for Blood II that provided background information on Caleb, Gabriella, Ishmael, and Ophelia, narrated by a deceased Gideon. As the Chosen continue to walk home to their world from the invading reality, they encounter a psychic beast known as the Nightmare that captures Caleb due to the Chosen attracting it by telling scary stories.

The player then has to relive some of the most horrific moments of the Chosen's lives – Caleb fighting the Cabal in the frozen north (Blood, episode two), the Cabal attack on Ophelia's sorority which led her to join, Ishmael's escape from his life as a circus freak into the Cabal, and Gabriella's spooky night in a haunted house.

Caleb pops in at the end of each of the other Chosen's stories, and tries to figure out what is going on. After Gabriella's nightmare, he is transported to a level resembling the old west, which he escapes back out into the otherworld. There he finds the Nightmare, surmises that it is the being responsible for his troubles, and slays it. Gideon finishes with an end narration, foretelling the Chosen's many adventures and conquests ahead of them.

The Nightmare Levels reintroduced the Robed Cultist enemies from the original game, added the Gremlins enemies and the Nightmare boss, CabalCo cultists re-skinned as killer clown guards, and two new weapons – the combat shotgun and the flayer. The game also added new multiplayer (BloodBath) models (CabalCo cultists, Soul Drudges, etc.) and modes (such as "Zombie Head Soccer").

== History ==
Blood II: The Chosen was developed by Monolith Productions and featured Monolith's new fully 3D engine LithTech, which was concurrently used in Shogo: Mobile Armor Division. The game was released on November 25, 1998, by GT Interactive, which was later purchased by Infogrames. An official expansion pack was released in August 1999 under the title of Blood II: The Chosen – The Nightmare Levels. As with Blood, a guide book was released for the game entitled Blood II: The Chosen Strategy Guide by Jamie Madigan.

Work on porting it and LithTech in general to Linux, and then later potentially to other systems like Solaris, was being done by employee Jeremy Blackman, but was never completed.

Around 1999, the source code was partly released to allow easier modding. On April 29, 2010 Blood II was re-released by the digital distributor GOG.com.

== Reception ==
Reception

Review scores
Publication	Score
Next Generation	2/5
PC Accelerator	8/10
PC Gaming World	4/10

Mark Asher of CNET Gamecenter reported "disappointing" sales for Blood II in the United States during 1998's Christmas shopping season, a problem it shared with competitors SiN and Shogo: Mobile Armor Division. Noting that the "only FPS game that has done really well [over the period] is Half-Life", he speculated that first-person shooters' market size was smaller than commonly believed. In April 1999, Asher wrote that the game "went nowhere at the retail level, although I've heard that Monolith has done well with OEM deals."

Next Generation reviewed the PC version of the game, rating it two stars out of five, and stated, "In the end, Blood 2 seems like the Sybil of video games; it mimics a lot of different shooter genres, but it has no personality of its own." Elvis Bacon of PC Gaming World disliked the game, writing that it "has neither the gameplay to compete with the definitive title of the genre—Half-Life—nor the character of its predecessor."
