= Guy Whitmore =

American video game composer

Guy Whitmore is an American composer specializing in video game music, notable for creating the soundtracks to Claw, Die Hard: Nakatomi Plaza, Russian Squares, Peggle 2, Shivers, Shivers II: Harvest of Souls, Blood, Blood II: The Chosen, Shogo: Mobile Armor Division and No One Lives Forever. He is the co-founder of a music production company called Music Design Network, and a founding member of the Seattle Composers Alliance.

Whitmore has specialized in creating "adaptive music" using techniques such as cross-fading, location-based music, and techniques to render music "on-the-fly" rather than using "pre-rendered" linear tracks.
