= Hyung Min-woo =

South Korean manhwa artist (born 1974)

Hyung Min-woo 형민우
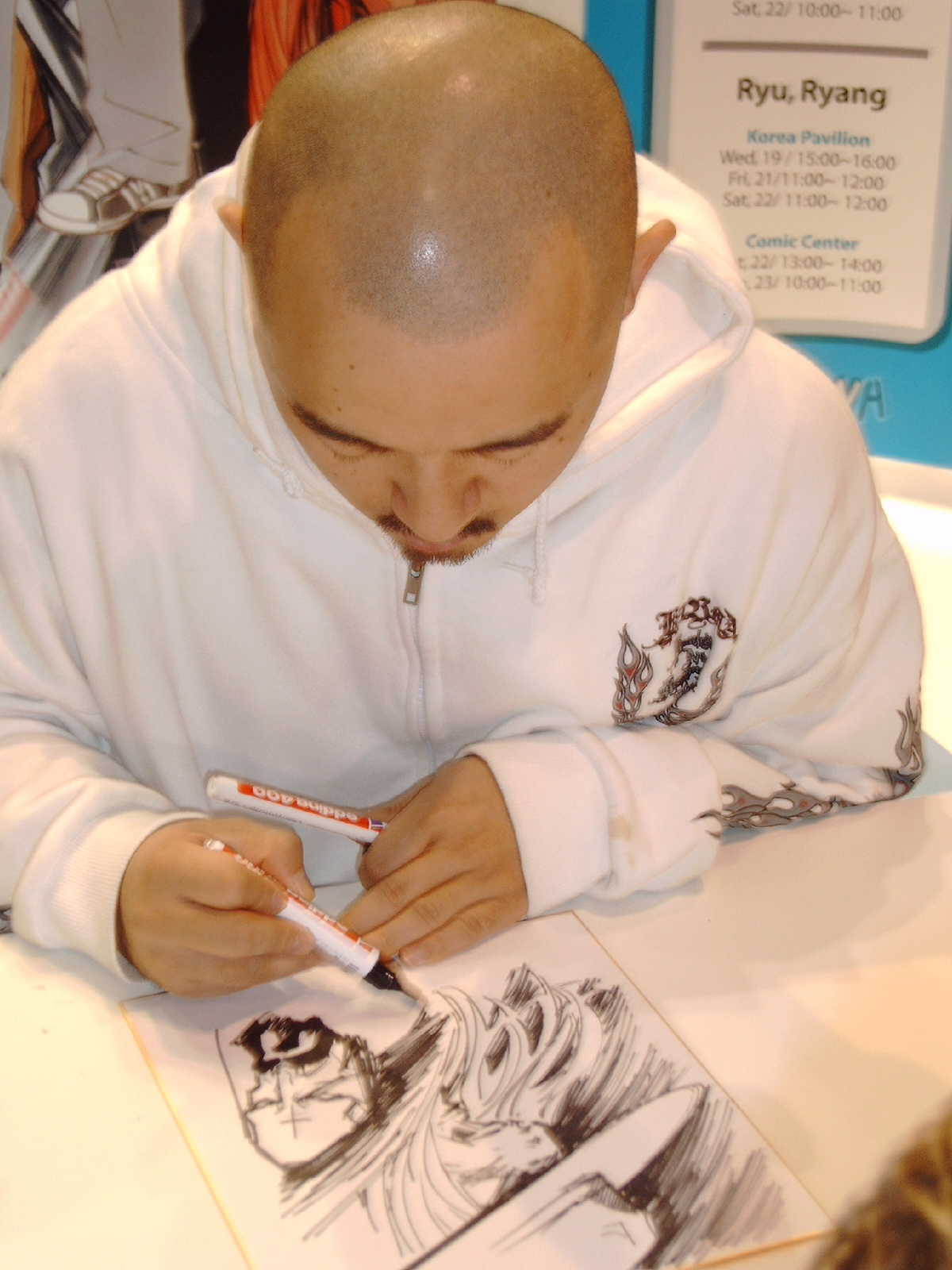
- Hyung Min-woo in October 2005 at Frankfurt Book Fair, Germany
- Born: April 14, 1974 (age 52) South Korea
- Area: Artist
- Notable works: Priest, Ghostface

- Hyung Min-woo
- Hangul: 형민우
- Hanja: 邢民友
- RR: Hyeong Minu
- MR: Hyŏng Minu

Hyung Min-woo (Korean: 형민우; born 14 April 1974) is a South Korean manhwa artist best known for his work on the series Priest.
