= Rayman: The Animated Series =

Television series by Ubisoft (1999–2000)

- Cover art of the French DVD release
- Based on: Rayman by Michel Ancel
- Developed by: Jonathan Greenberg
- Written by: Jonathan Greenburg; Michelle Jabloner-Weiss
- Story by: Vanessa Coffey; Jonathan Greenburg; Alexis Nolent
- Directed by: Laurent Jennet
- Creative director: Vanessa Coffey
- Voices of: Billy West; Carlos Alazraqui; Lacey Chabert; Kate Donahue; Carolyn Lawrence; Danny Mann; Candi Milo; Kath Soucie; Brian Stepanek
- Music by: La Belle Equipe
- Countries of origin: Canada; France; United States
- Original language: English
- No. of episodes: 4

Production
- Executive producers: Vanessa Coffey; Jim Ballantine; Gérard Guillemot
- Producer: François Pétavy
- Editor: Alexis Nolent
- Running time: 13 minutes
- Production company: Ubi Soft

Original release
- Release: 20 December 1999 – 10 January 2000

Rayman: The Animated Series (Note: Also known as Rayman: The TV Series, or just Rayman.) is a series of animated short films created by Ubi Soft in 1999, based on the Rayman series, following the success of Rayman 2: The Great Escape.

It was meant to be a 26-episode series with a projected fall 2000 release, but only four were completed before it was cancelled mid-series due to production issues. The series aired only in Europe, but was released on VHS in North America and, in France, on DVD before airing on TV. The show met with mixed reviews from critics.

== Premise ==
Lac-Mac, Betina, Cookie, and Flips are performers in a galactic circus run by the abusive Rigatoni and his henchman, Admiral Razorbeard. One night, Rayman is brought into the circus as a new performer. Shortly after, Rayman and the other circus performers escape to the city of Aeropolis, where they are forced to hide from a bumbling detective named Grub, who has been hired by Rigatoni to track down the runaway performers.

== Characters ==
- Rayman (voiced by Billy West) – The protagonist of the show. He has no limbs, with most of his body floating in the air. In the English dub, he speaks with a New Jersey English accent.
- Betina (voiced by Carolyn Lawrence in episode 1, Lacey Chabert in episodes 2 and 3, and Kath Soucie in episode 4) – A kind-hearted humanoid girl, who is particularly close to Flips, but has a rivalry with Cookie due to his rude behaviour.
- Cookie (voiced by Carlos Alazraqui) – A paranoid and condescending anthropomorphic mole.
- Flips (voiced by Candi Milo) – A young female fairy, who cannot speak English and instead communicates via squeaking noises that Betina can understand.
- Lac-Mac (voiced by Danny Mann) – A slightly dumb, linguistically challenged anthropomorphic rabbit who has super strength.
- Rigatoni (voiced by Danny Mann) – The cruel owner of the flying circus and the main antagonist of the show. He is the one who hires Grub to track down Rayman and the other performers after they escape. His name is derived from a pasta of the same name and he has a Brooklyn accent.
- Admiral Razorbeard (voiced by Carlos Alazraqui) – A robot pirate working for Rigatoni, who previously appeared as the main antagonist of Rayman 2: The Great Escape.
- Grub (voiced by Billy West) – A policeman and detective hired by Rigatoni to capture Rayman and his friends. He lives on his own in an apartment building, living one floor below the hideout of Rayman and his friends.

== Production and release ==
Rayman: The Animated Series was announced in December 1998, by Ubi Soft, as the first animated show in the Rayman series, with a budget of US $7.5 million. According to producer François Pétavy, the series was internationally co-produced by Ubi Soft's teams in France (pilot episode, design, storyboard, a scenario portion, layout and post-production), Canada (animation, set modeling, characters integration and rendering), and the United States (script). 26 quarter-hour episodes were planned with a release during the fall of 2000.

The series was first shown at the Annecy International Animated Film Festival, NATPE, and the Quebec government in 1999. The second episode that was shown at those festivals was "No Parking", serving as a pilot episode. The show had also been broadcast in Europe (France, Germany and the Netherlands) and the United States. It was also released on VHS in North America, and on DVD in France prior to the TV airing.

The series was cancelled after the fourth episode was completed, leaving a fifth episode unfinished (though Midi Libre also reported the sixth episode had been in production before cancellation). The cancellation was made due to production issues; Destructoid and Retro Gamer reported that the reason for the show's cancellation was due to a lack of funds. Plans to broadcast the show worldwide were also shelved.

== Reception and legacy ==
Game Informer praised the show's 3D computer animation visuals, finding it "quite spectacular". Thinking that "this is the look we can expect from Rayman games on the PlayStation 2." The show's voice actor of Rayman, Billy West, would later voice Murfy's character in Rayman 3: Hoodlum Havoc and Rayman Legends Retold.

== Episodes ==
No.	Title	Original release date
1	"Lac-Mac Napping" "(LacMac Napping)"	20 December 1999
Rayman, a creature with no limbs, is forced to perform in a mobile circus by its abusive owner, Rigatoni and his minion Admiral Razorbeard, who imprison Rayman in a cage with the circus' other performers: Lac-Mac, a dim-witted rabbit; Betina, a kind-hearted girl; Cookie, a pompous mole; and Flips, a dragonfly-like fairy girl. Rayman comes up with a plan for everyone to escape the circus by having Lac-Mac use his strength to bend the cage bars while Flips flies around the surveillance cameras to distract Rigatoni. Rayman then uses Cookie's knife to cut a hole in the circus tent, allowing the group to leave. Enraged at his performers' escape, Rigatoni enlists the help of a detective named Grub to track down Rayman and his friends, who have fled to the city of Aeropolis.
2	"No Parking" "(Stationnement interdit)"	27 December 1999
While driving in a car in search of a place to hide from the law, Rayman and his friends are spotted by Grub though they manage to evade him. While the group hide out at a park, Flips takes a nap in the car, which is soon taken away by a tow truck. Realising that Flips is trapped in the car, Rayman and the others travel to the Scrapyard, where the car is being taken but not without Grub following them. At the Scrapyard, Rayman uses his magic hands to save Flips in the nick of time and Lac-Mac chases Grub away with a steamroller. The group leave the Scrapyard in the steamroller but end up falling off a pier and crashing into an apartment building; unbeknownst to them, their new room is just above Grub's own apartment.
3	"High Anxiety" "(Cookie craque)"	3 January 2000
Cookie has been dealing with a splitting headache due to the crash that the group experienced from the previous episode, so they all take a taxi to the doctor's office. There, Cookie's doctor concludes that the problem is in his mind and that he should be put in a mental asylum. While in the asylum, Cookie meets his new roommate, who turns out to be the mother of Grub. Meanwhile, in the waiting room, Rayman and the others find Grub entering the building to visit his mother; fearing that Grub will discover Cookie, the group decide to find Cookie before Grub does. Grub soon arrives at his mother and Cookie's room and ends up recognising Cookie before Rayman and the others arrive. They all escape with the help of Grub's mother while Grub is mistaken for a similar-looking patient and is thrown into that patient's cell.
4	"Big Date" "(Grub flirte)"	10 January 2000
After discovering that they are out of food, Rayman and his friends decide to go to the grocery store but are afraid of possibly getting caught by Grub. While checking to see whether Grub is home, they discover that Grub has a date and conclude that he might focus less on arresting them while pursuing a romantic relationship. Due to his clumsiness, Grub's date goes poorly, prompting Rayman and the gang to secretly help him out. In spite of the group's efforts at tidying Grub's apartment and preparing a feast, Grub ends up angering his date after he accidentally dumps food on her. In a last-ditch effort to save Grub's evening, Rayman goes to Grub's date's house to give her a singing telegram, apologising for the disastrous date and inviting her to the movies, which she happily accepts.

== See also ==
- Rabbids Invasion – another TV show based on the Rayman franchise
