= Rayman: Hoodlums' Revenge =

2005 video game

- North American cover art
- Developer: Digital Eclipse
- Publisher: Ubisoft
- Designers: Rafael Baptista; Ryan Slemko; Eric Emery; Christoph Sapinsky
- Programmers: Rafael Baptista; Adam Leggett; Darren Schebek; Pierre Tardif
- Artists: Luc Velhulst; Jeff Faust; Tony Lupidi; Roberta Brandão
- Composer: Mashi Hasu
- Series: Rayman
- Platform: Game Boy Advance
- Release: NA: March 15, 2005; EU: March 18, 2005
- Genre: Platform
- Mode: Single-player

Rayman: Hoodlums' Revenge, (Note: A typo on the North American box art has "Hoodlum's" rather than "Hoodlums'", implying the revenge of a single Hoodlum character, rather than the Hoodlums collectively.) (French: Rayman: La Revanche des Hoodlums) is a platform game developed by Digital Eclipse and published by Ubisoft for the Game Boy Advance in 2005. It was the first Rayman game to be a isometric platformer and was set after Rayman 3: Hoodlum Havoc.

== Gameplay ==
Rayman standing in Vertiginous Riddle

Rayman: Hoodlums' Revenge is an isometric platformer with a mix of puzzle gameplay elements. The player can play as Rayman and Globox through various levels. Rayman's abilities are his default attack, hover jump, and climbing. The game includes adventuring elements, where the player will have to track down switches in order to progress to the next segment of the level.

The goal is to complete each level, while collecting the maximum number of gems and lums, freeing Teensies and defeating enemies gives the player points. When the level is completed, the player earns "Murfy" stamps based on the player score. These stamps can be used to unlock extra levels.

== Plot ==
Rayman and Globox were sleeping in a forest, Globox's dreams are disturbed by the Black Lum André. He is awakened by a strange sound, and sets off to search for his source. Rayman wakes up later to find Globox missing, and sets off to look for him. As he journeys onward, Rayman is told by Murfy that the Hoodlums are trying to clone Reflux, an antagonist from Rayman 3. Rayman must destroy the Infernal Machine, which makes the potent plum juice before he could meet Globox. Meanwhile, in the Bog of Murk, Globox was slowly being taken over by André, This is apparent by Globox's sudden mood swings in which he becomes condescending and aggressive. Later, when he escapes from prison and reunites with Rayman, André often insults Rayman or the feeble attempts of the Hoodlums.

Meanwhile, Globox is unaware of what's going on. As they continue through the land, they must save the Teensies and defeat bosses. In the Pit of Endless Fire, after the defeat of the Firemonster, André takes full control of Globox and announces his return. When Rayman finally encounters the cloned Reflux, created from Globox's body, and defeats him, an unconscious Globox appears. André's black spirit flutters away through Globox's mouth. Globox wakes up and asks if he missed breakfast and the game ends with the pair walking off into the forest.

== Development ==
Rayman: Hoodlums' Revenge was developed by Digital Eclipse. In 2003, Digital Eclipse had merged with ImaginEngine to become Backbone Entertainment. In 2005 Backbone merged with The Collective to form Foundation 9 Entertainment. During this period, Digital Eclipse remained a brand within the bigger business.

== Release and reception ==
Reception

Aggregate scores
Aggregator	Score
GameRankings	59%
Metacritic	61/100

Review scores
Publication	Score
GamePro	3/5
GameSpot	7.3/10
IGN	6.5/10
Jeuxvideo.com	11/20
Nintendo World Report	5/10

In February 2005, Ubisoft announced Rayman: Hoodlums' Revenge and stated that the game would be released on the same day as Rayman DS for the Nintendo DS.

Rayman Hoodlums' Revenge received mixed or average reviews from review aggregator Metacritic. GamePro writer GameGirl praised the game's music and sound effects while criticizing the linear and repetitive gameplay and the isometric camera angle which makes it difficult to navigate through the levels. She also noted that the control pad handles diagonal movements clumsily, and unwisely prevents the fluidity that characterizes the Rayman series. GamesRadar+ writer described the game as a visually appealing platform game but criticized the game's isometric viewpoint and level design.
