= Rayman Legends =

2013 video game

- Developer: Ubisoft Montpellier (Note: Pastagames co-developed the Switch version.)
- Publisher: Ubisoft
- Director: Michel Ancel
- Producers: Abdelhak Elguess; Pierre-Arnaud Lambert
- Designer: Emile Morel
- Programmer: Guillaume Gernez
- Artist: Jean-Christophe Alessandri
- Composers: Christophe Héral; Billy Martin
- Series: Rayman
- Engine: UbiArt Framework
- Platforms: Microsoft Windows; PlayStation 3 Wii U Xbox 360; PlayStation Vita; PlayStation 4 Xbox One; Nintendo Switch; Stadia
- Release: Microsoft Windows, PlayStation 3, Wii U, Xbox 360: AU: 29 August 2013; EU: 30 August 2013; NA: 3 September 2013; PlayStation Vita: NA: 3 September 2013; AU: 12 September 2013; EU: 13 September 2013; PlayStation 4, Xbox One: NA: 18 February 2014; EU: 21 February 2014; Nintendo Switch: NA: 12 September 2017; EU: 12 September 2017; Stadia: WW: 23 November 2021
- Genre: Platform
- Modes: Single-player, multiplayer

Rayman Legends is a 2013 platform game developed by Ubisoft Montpellier and published by Ubisoft. It is the fifth main title in the Rayman series and the direct sequel to the 2011 game Rayman Origins. The game was released for Microsoft Windows, PlayStation 3, Xbox 360, Wii U, and PlayStation Vita platforms in August and September 2013. PlayStation 4 and Xbox One versions were released on February 18, 2014, with a Stadia version released in November 2021. A Nintendo Switch port, titled Rayman Legends Definitive Edition, was released in North America, Europe and Australia on September 12, 2017.

Rayman Legends was announced at E3 2012 for Wii U and was planned for release during the console's launch window. However, the game was delayed to February 2013 in order to put the finishing touches to the game, and due to the financial failure of ZombiU, the release was delayed again by six months and the game was made multi-platform.

Rayman Legends received critical acclaim upon release. Critics praised the game's visuals, level design, controls, soundtrack, overall gameplay, and the large amount of content. The game experienced slow sales on release but sold over a million copies by 2014. A remake, Rayman Legends Retold, is scheduled to be released on December 3, 2026.

== Gameplay ==
Rayman Legends is a platform game.

The game carries on the style of gameplay from Rayman Origins in which up to four players (depending on the format) simultaneously make their way through various levels. Lums can be collected by touching them, defeating enemies, or freeing captured Teensies. Collecting Teensies unlocks new worlds, which can be played in any order once they are available. Along with Rayman, Globox, and the Teensies returning as playable characters, players can now control the new female character Barbara the Barbarian Princess, her sister and their cousins, once they are rescued from certain stages.

In addition to the main playable characters, Murfy the greenbottle, who first appeared in Rayman 2: The Great Escape, appears as an assist character. Murfy can perform various actions such as cutting through ropes, activating mechanisms, grabbing hold of enemies and assisting in gathering Lums. These offer a range of levels in which co-operation is required to progress. In the Wii U, PlayStation Vita, and PlayStation 4 versions of the game, an additional player can control Murfy directly with touch controls, using the Wii U GamePad, the Vita's front touch screen, and the DualShock 4 touchpad respectively. In single-player mode, control will switch over to Murfy during certain sections whilst the computer controls the player's character. In the PlayStation 3, Xbox 360, Xbox One, and PC versions of the game, Murfy moves automatically and can be prompted to interact with certain objects with button controls. Other new features include sections where players can fire projectile fists at enemies and rhythm based levels set to covers of songs such as "Black Betty", "Eye of the Tiger", and "Woo-Hoo".

The game features over one hundred twenty levels, including forty remastered levels from the original Rayman Origins, which are unlocked by obtaining Lucky Tickets, which can also win additional Lums and Teensies. Some levels feature remixed 'Invaded' versions, which must be completed as quickly as possible. The game also offers daily and weekly challenge stages, in which players can compete with other players via leaderboards in challenges such as collecting a certain number of Lums in a short time or surviving the longest on a stage. More challenge stages can be accessed by raising the player's 'awesomeness' rating, which increases by collecting trophies earned by rescuing Teensies, collecting a high number of Lums in each level or by having a high leaderboard position at the end of a challenge. A local multiplayer football game, Kung Foot, is also featured, in which players use attacks to knock a football into the opponent's goal.

== Plot ==
One century after the events of Origins have passed, Rayman, Globox, and the Teensies have been sound asleep after the adventure. During that time, the Bubble Dreamer's nightmares have gotten stronger and expanded with help from the Magician (who survived and split himself into 5 Dark Teensies) and captured Barbara and her fellow warrior princesses. Upon finding out, Murfy wakes up Rayman and co. and tells them what has happened before setting off to end the chaos. After beating each world's boss (Grunderbite, the Armored Toad, El Chili, a mechanical dragon and the Cloud of Darkness/Hades' Hand), Rayman and co. punch each Magician into space, where they each end up being used as instruments by imps for fun in a parody of A Trip to the Moon.

== Development ==
The game was first leaked in an online marketing survey, which hinted that the upcoming "Rayman Origins 2" would include dragons, vampires, ghosts, the return of the Land of the Livid Dead and also someone dear to the Rayman series, in addition to returning features from its predecessor. Subsequently, Ubisoft registered the domain names "RaymanLegends.com" and "Rayman-Legends.com".

On 27 April 2012, the game's first trailer was leaked, revealing several details about it, including new playable characters, as well as the inclusion of online multiplayer. The end of the trailer also showcased Wii U exclusive features such as the use of NFC to make figures placed on the touchscreen appear on the game, as demonstrated with figures of Rabbids and Ezio from Assassin's Creed. Ubisoft later released a statement that confirmed its development, though stated it was "intended as a purely internal demonstrative video, and in no way represents the final game, the final console or their features."

The game was officially unveiled for the Wii U and demonstrated by Ubisoft at the E3 2012 trade show, Murfy appeared as a playable character in the demo. Though Ubisoft has only confirmed the game's release on the Wii U, Ubisoft senior game manager Michael Micholic stated that Ubisoft is considering PS3, Xbox 360 and PC versions of Rayman Legends as "we're looking at a lot of different launch options". A trailer released at Gamescom 2012 revealed it would be exclusive to the Wii U.

It was originally set to be released on 30 November 2012 (as a Wii U launch title). However, on 8 October 2012, it was reported to be delayed. On 13 December 2012, a demo of the game was released on the Wii U eShop. The official release date was revealed to be 26 February 2013, but was delayed further to September 2013 to allow for the title to have a simultaneous release on PlayStation 3 and Xbox 360. This delay upset fans since the developer had stated that the Wii U version was already finished. Fans started a petition for the game to be released on the original date on the Wii U, which had over 11,000 people signed onto it. To appease fans, Ubisoft said the Wii U would get another exclusive demo in the future, however this was just as negatively received. Developers that worked on the game have also expressed their distaste for the delay, while creator Michel Ancel was photographed with protesters campaigning for the release of the game.

In response to the delay, the development team announced that they will be releasing the game's Online Challenges mode for free via the Nintendo eShop, which released on 25 April 2013. This mode features daily challenges based on one of five scenarios, one of which is exclusive to Wii U, and features online leaderboards and ghost functionality. They also stated that with the extra development time, they would be adding new levels, enemies and more to the game. On 24 February 2013, it was revealed that Michel Ancel and the Montpellier team might leave Ubisoft over the controversy but Ubisoft denied any rumours. According to Yves Guillemot, chairman and CEO of Ubisoft, ZombiU's poor sales performance led to the decision of making Rayman Legends a multiplatform game. Although the team considered using Xbox Smartglass to recreate the game's Wii U GamePad features on Xbox 360, the system was not responsive enough.

On 1 August 2013 it was announced that Wii U owners who downloaded the Rayman Legends Challenges App prior to 28 August 2013 receive an exclusive costume for Rayman. Pre-orders of certain versions of the game either come with bonus character Avelina, inspired by Aveline de Grandpré from Assassin's Creed III: Liberation, or bonus costumes for Rayman. On 7 August 2013, in a Nintendo Direct presentation, two new costumes were announced for the Wii U version: a Mario costume for Rayman, and a Luigi costume for Globox. On 23 August, the Rayman Legends Musical Beatbox App became available on the internet, iTunes, and Android devices. This app allows users to create their own songs from scratch, or by using Legendary Mode, which allows them to edit the game songs with 3 choices: Teensies in Trouble, 20000 Lums Under the Sea, and Fiesta de los Muertos. On 28 August 2013, Ubisoft announced on the Rayman Legends site that the European PlayStation Vita Version has been delayed to 12 September 2013 to apply the "final level of polish" players expect from a Rayman game.

The game features various improvements to the Ubi Art Framework engine used in Origins. These include a new dynamic lighting system, which lightens or silhouettes characters based on their environment, along with stealth sections that make use of light and shadow, and the seamless integration of 3D elements in 2D environments, made prominent in the game's 3D modelled bosses and monsters.

A smartphone game based on Legends' art style, Rayman Fiesta Run, was developed by Pastagames and released for iOS and Android devices on 7 November 2013. It is the sequel to the previous title, Rayman Jungle Run.

On the PS4 and Xbox One, Rayman Legends took advantage of the improved specifications. This means the game uses uncompressed textures and features reduced loading times between levels. Rayman's bonus costumes from the PS3 and Xbox 360 versions are also readily available in these versions.

A Nintendo Switch port co-developed by Pastagames (who would later collaborate with Ubisoft on Rayman Mini), nicknamed Definitive Edition, was released in September 2017.

In 2020, Ubisoft announced a Play Your Part, Play At Home campaign during the COVID-19 pandemic. As part of this campaign, PC users were able to redeem a free digital copy of Rayman Legends (among other games) via the Ubisoft website.

== Reception ==
=== Critical response ===
Reception

Aggregate scores
Aggregator	Score
Metacritic	PC: 89/100; PS3: 91/100; WIIU: 92/100; X360: 90/100; VITA: 87/100; PS4: 90/100; XONE: 91/100; NS: 84/100
OpenCritic	95% recommend

Review scores
Publication	Score
Edge	9/10
Famitsu	33/40
Game Informer	9/10
GameSpot	9/10
GamesRadar+	PS4/XONE: 4.5/5
GameTrailers	9.1/10
Giant Bomb	VITA/WIIU: 5/5
IGN	9.5/10
Nintendo Life	9/10
Nintendo World Report	9.5/10
Polygon	8.5/10

Rayman Legends received "universal acclaim", according to the review aggregator website Metacritic. Edge gave the game a 9/10 praising it by saying "One of the most jubilant, vividly imagined and open-hearted platformers to come along in a long time". GamesRadar gave the game a score of 4.5 out of 5 stars, praising the level variety and presentation, whilst criticizing the sometimes chaotic multiplayer and some of the touchscreen sections during solo play. Tom McShea of GameSpot rated the game a 9.0/10 praising the game mechanics, the level design and the local co-op.

Jose Otero of IGN rated the game a 9.5/10, praising the gameplay and the design of the levels, saying that "Naturally, Rayman starts out with simple running, jumping, and punching, but before you know it you’re sneaking past dozens of deadly traps, battling huge bosses, or playing through awesome challenge levels that look like '90s music videos. Every time I thought I found a personal favorite stage, the next one came along and replaced it", but criticized the absence of online co-op. Danielle Riendeau of Polygon rated the game an 8.5/10 saying that it is "a beautifully designed gauntlet". Thomas Whitehead of Nintendo Life gave the Wii U version an "excellent" 9/10, stating it is "close to perfection", but with "minor missteps". He criticized the game's short length but added that "Clearly aware of this, the developers made those hours utterly glorious".

GameTrailers stating that the co-operative play on the Wii U GamePad "only serves to complement the game design". Game Informer writer Jeff Cork discussed how flexible Murfy can be in the game which players can use him to poke or tickle enemies to temporarily stun them which left them vulnerable to the player's attacks. He also discussed that one of his favorite gimmicks was Murfy rotates large wheels that contain spikes and platforms and he also noted an obstacles in a level comes in the form of giant slabs of cake which Murfy has an insatiable appetite, and he crunched paths for the player. GamesRadar+ writer Lucas Sullivan noted that Murfy was the biggest change in the game and he discussed that players who played as him should be cautious and he would make a great addition to the series. Polygon writer Michael McWhertor described him as "part puzzle solver and part guardian angel" and he discussed that Murfy can burst enemies that looked like flaming ghosts before they could defeat the player. Nintendo World Report writer Neal Ronaghan played as him and felt that he is the personification of the Wii U Gamepad. He also discussed that he was sometimes bored during the Boost Mode in New Super Mario Bros. U, however, he was constantly enjoying playing as Murfy in the game, especially during segments where the player have to tilt the GamePad to help the playable characters maneuver through spiked passages.

During the 17th Annual D.I.C.E. Awards, the Academy of Interactive Arts & Sciences nominated Rayman Legends for "Family Game of the Year", "Outstanding Achievement in Art Direction", and "Outstanding Achievement in Original Music Composition".

=== Sales ===
Within its first week of international sales, Legends outsold Origins, with the Wii U version selling the most copies. However, a month later, Ubisoft reported that the launch failed to meet their financial expectations. One million units were sold by November 2013, and Ubisoft reported in early November 2014 that Rayman Legends was still selling well and contributing to the company's earnings. As of February 4, 2019, Rayman Legends has sold 4.48 million copies across all platforms, including the PS Vita and Nintendo Switch.

== Remake ==
On 2 June 2026, Ubisoft announced Rayman Legends Retold, co-developed by Ubisoft's divisions in Milan and Montpellier in the Snowdrop engine. In addition to a new 2.5D visual style, the remake adds 3D segments during gameplay, new levels, new minigames, a new soundtrack by the original composer Christophe Héral along with Grant Kirkhope, and full voice acting (including David Gasman as Rayman and Billy West as Murfy, both reprising their roles from Rayman 3: Hoodlum Havoc). The first standalone console Rayman game since the original Legends, it is set to be released on 3 December 2026 for Nintendo Switch 2, PlayStation 5, Windows, and Xbox Series X/S.

When asked why Ubisoft decided to remake Rayman Legends, Rayman brand producer Loïc Gounon said that Rayman Legends Retold was intended to serve as a foundation for the future of the franchise. In a separate interview with GamesRadar+, Gounon said Ubisoft believed it might be time to return to more adventurous 3D Rayman games, adding that such a direction was the plan "if everything goes well". When asked regarding the fate of previous releases of Rayman Legends on modern platforms, the official Rayman Twitter account confirmed they’d be “staying put”.
