= Rayman Origins =

2011 video game

- Developers: Ubisoft Montpellier; Ubisoft Paris; Ubisoft Casablanca (Note: Ported to OS X by Feral Interactive, who also handled publishing duties.)
- Publisher: Ubisoft
- Directors: Michel Ancel; Sébastien Morin
- Producer: Pierre-Arnaud Lambert
- Designers: Lorenzo Avi; Juilen Chevallier; Romain Claude; Axel Cossardeaux
- Programmers: Guillaume Gernez (lead); Philippe Vimont (animation system creation & programming); Yousri Salas (animation system creation & programming)
- Artists: Celine Tellier (producer); Amina Rachdi (associate producer); Jean-Baptiste Rollin (lead level artist)
- Writer: Gabrielle Shrager (lead)
- Composers: Christophe Héral; Billy Martin
- Series: Rayman
- Engine: UbiArt Framework
- Platforms: Microsoft Windows; OS X; Wii; Xbox 360; PlayStation 3; PlayStation Vita; Nintendo 3DS; Enhanced Edition; Nintendo Switch 2; PlayStation 5; Windows; Xbox Series X/S
- Release: November 15, 2011: PlayStation 3, Wii, Xbox 360; NA: November 15, 2011; AU: November 24, 2011; EU: November 25, 2011; PlayStation Vita; NA: February 15, 2012; EU: February 22, 2012; AU: February 23, 2012; Microsoft Windows; NA: March 29, 2012; AU: March 29, 2012; EU: March 30, 2012; Nintendo 3DS; EU: June 8, 2012; AU: June 14, 2012; NA: November 6, 2012; OS X; December 12, 2013; Enhanced Edition; Nintendo Switch 2, PlayStation 5, Windows, Xbox Series X/S; December 3, 2026
- Genre: Platform
- Modes: Single-player, multiplayer

Rayman Origins is a 2011 platform game developed and published by Ubisoft. It is the fourth main installment in the Rayman series and the first main installment following Rayman 3: Hoodlum Havoc (2003). The game was released for the PlayStation 3, Xbox 360, and Wii platforms worldwide, with PlayStation Vita, Nintendo 3DS, and Microsoft Windows versions being released the following year. The OS X version of the game was released on December 12, 2013, by Feral Interactive. The story follows Rayman, his friend Globox, and two Teensies as they fight Darktoons and other evil creatures that have infected the Glade of Dreams after they unleashed said evil by complete accident.

Rayman Origins has received critical acclaim, being highly praised for its graphical style, level design, and sense of humor. Despite its critical reception, the game experienced sluggish sales at the beginning of its release, but sold well in the end and contributed to the company's earnings. A mobile game based on Origins, titled Rayman Jungle Run, was developed by Pastagames and released for iOS, Android, and for Windows Phone 8 on May 29, 2013. A sequel, Rayman Legends, was released for Microsoft Windows, PlayStation 3, PlayStation Vita, Wii U and Xbox 360 in 2013 to similar critical acclaim.

A remastered version of the game for current-gen consoles, Rayman Origins: Enhanced Edition, is scheduled to be released on Nintendo Switch 2, PlayStation 5, Windows, and Xbox Series X/S on December 3, 2026, and will be included with all versions of Rayman Legends Retold.

== Gameplay ==
Rayman Origins co-operative gameplay

Rayman Origins is a side-scrolling platformer, the same style as the original Rayman game. Rayman Origins is playable with up to four local players who may drop in or out at any time. Players can choose to control either Rayman, Globox or two Teensies, with additional costumes available as the game progresses.

Players travel through each level, fighting enemies and rescuing imprisoned Electoons. As the game progresses, players gain new abilities such as running up walls, gliding in midair, swimming underwater and shrinking in size to reach new areas. Certain segments also see players riding a mosquito, where players can shoot enemies or inhale and fire them. If a character is hit by an enemy or hazard, they will "bubblize", or inflate into a ballooned state. To get out of this state, another player can slap, or jump on them, similar to New Super Mario Bros. Wii. Players can also collect hearts that will protect them from one hit. However, if all players are bubblized simultaneously, or if a character is hit during single play, they will explode and the play will return to the last checkpoint, normally a Darkblocker where the player had go through before, or the last place where the player broke a cage. Throughout each level, players can collect yellow Lums, which they will need for Electoons. When a character collects a Lum King, it turns all Lums red for a short time. Red Lums are worth two yellow Lums. There are also Skull Coins placed in hidden or dangerous areas. They are worth 25 Lums if successfully collected. If the player gets harmed while collecting a Skull Coin, they will lose it and the player must try again to get the coin.

In order to progress through certain parts of the story, players need to free Electoons. The most common way to get Electoons is to free them from cages; there is one at the end of each level, with more to be found in hidden areas and are guarded by several enemies that collectively use a forcefield to protect the cage, the team must defeat every single enemy that uses the forcefield, then the cage can be destroyed by attacking it. Most of the cages are hidden away in secret passages, so once the Electoons are free, they will create a portal which leads to the outside of these passages. Each level contains a medallion that shows how many Electoon challenges the players completed, such as break a single cage, collect a specific amount of Lums or beat the clock whilst the level has been completed. In every level there are hidden cages ranging from 1 to 3. More Electoons can be earned by collecting a certain amount of Lums within a level and clearing Time Trials that are unlocked after clearing a level once. Scoring high marks in either of these challenges can also earn medals and trophies. Players can also unlock special 'treasure chest' levels, in which they must chase a runaway treasure chest across a dangerous course in order to receive a skull tooth. Completing all of the teeth grants access to the bonus level, The Land of the Livid Dead.

While every version of the game is nearly identical due to the game engine's high versatility, there are some minor differences across platforms. The Wii version of the game takes advantage of the versatility (though not the motion controls) of the Wii Remote to provide three different control schemes, while the Nintendo 3DS version displays the player's current progress during a particular level on the touchscreen. The PlayStation Vita version has some additional unlockable content and players can use the touchscreen for some in-game actions. Achievements are available on the PlayStation 3, PlayStation Vita, and Xbox 360 versions through online support, while the Nintendo 3DS version's achievements are associated to a saved game.

== Plot ==
At the beginning of the game, Bubble Dreamer, Rayman, his best friend Globox, and a couple of Teensies friends are chilling out at Bubble Dreamer's resting grounds, the Snoring Tree. However, their snoring, with the help of a strange microphone disguised to resemble a flower, disturbs an old granny from the Land of the Livid Dead, who retaliates by sending an evil army of horrendous creatures and the Darktoons across the world. The heroes, being woken up, fight back, but are defeated and captured. Rayman escapes and finds out the Darktoons have captured the Electoons that inhabit the world, imprisoned his "mother" Betilla the Nymph and her sisters and plunged the Glade of Dreams into chaos. This causes Bubble Dreamer to go crazy, and as a result, have nightmares. Rayman and his friends are then tasked by the Magician to gather enough Electoons to cure Bubble Dreamer and restore the Glade. Their efforts to locate the Electoons allow them to gain access to the various lands of the Glade, and rescue the Nymphs along the way.

Eventually, they make their way to a mysterious gate, which can only be opened by rescuing the Glade Kings, who have been turned into monsters as a result of Bubble Dreamer's nightmares. Upon freeing the Glade Kings, the Nymphs are able to open the stargate, granting Rayman access to a hideout in the steampunk-themed land of Moody Clouds. There, they discover that their supposed friend, the Magician, is the one responsible for all the chaos. He secretly admires Mr. Dark, the villain of the original Rayman, and he is a Teensy who was mocked by the other Teensies for his lesser magical abilities, and he was behind the events that caused the Land of the Livid Dead forces and the Nightmares to attack: with all the chaos distracting and preoccupying the heroes, and him using the Lums they had given him to power and use his diabolical machines, he would be able to dethrone Polokus and become the new leader of the Glade by controlling the Nightmares out of Polokus' control. The Magician then sends Rayman and his friends into a pit with his mechanical monsters, but they escape and return to his office. The Magician then begins to dance and sends them into a dancing funk, using this as a good time to escape. The heroes chase after and fight the Magician in his escape airship, sending it crashing into the power source of his hideout. The resulting chain of events causes the hideout to explode, while Rayman and his friends free-fall back to the Snoring Tree, where they proceed to resume their relaxation.

If players manage to collect the ten ruby teeth throughout the game, they can gain access to the Land of the Livid Dead itself, where another monster, Big Mama, awaits. Once defeated, it is revealed to be the nymph of the Land of the Livid Dead, turned into a Nightmare because of the Darktoons, and then she thanks her saviours for freeing her.

== Development ==
The game was officially announced at the end of Ubisoft's E3 2010 press conference as a downloadable episodic title for PlayStation Network and Xbox Live Arcade with release on PC, Nintendo 3DS, iPad, and iPhone "to be considered". The first episode was originally to be released by the end of 2010, but was delayed until 2011. Following a dearth of information in the new year, the project was confirmed as alive in April 2011. In May 2011, it was announced the title has been expanded to a full-retail title, with a tentative release of Q4 2011.

The game is the first title to use UbiArt Framework, an in-house graphics engine which allows artists to easily create content and then use it in an interactive environment. The artists only have to pose the model and edit the silhouette, as the software takes care of image distortion automatically. The main aim of this engine is to allow artists and designers focus on the art itself, without having to worry about technical aspects of game development. According to Yves Guillemot, only five people were working on the game when it was first announced. Ubisoft obtained a French government grant, dedicated to supporting the arts, for developing UbiArt tools. The engine is optimized for HD resolutions, allowing games to run in full 1080p HD at 60 frames per second, with the 3DS version running at 30 frames per second. The engine was further developed for Rayman Legends to include dynamic lighting and integration of 3D models.

== Reception ==
=== Critical response ===
Reception

Aggregate score
Aggregator	Score
Metacritic	PS3: 87/100; Wii: 92/100; X360: 87/100; Vita: 88/100; PC: 86/100; 3DS: 71/100

Review scores
Publication	Score
1Up.com	A−
Eurogamer	8/10
Game Informer	8.5/10
GameTrailers	8.5/10
IGN	9.5/10
Joystiq	5/5
Nintendo Life	10/10
Nintendo Power	9.5/10
VideoGamer.com	8/10

Rayman Origins received critical acclaim. Review aggregator website Metacritic gave the Wii version 92/100, the PlayStation Vita version 88/100, the Xbox 360 version 87/100 the PlayStation 3 version 87/100, the PC version 86/100, and the Nintendo 3DS version 71/100.

1UP.com gave the game an A− Rank, praising its varied level design, saying "Origins' brilliance is it keeps that simplicity on the surface, but ends up feeling incredibly varied thanks to its level design", and calling it "the best 2D platformer not called Mario."

Eurogamer rated the game 8/10, calling it "a delightful, playful, and occasionally exhilarating platformer" while opining that the level design was inferior to the Mario series in that "the same ideas are repeated too often." GameTrailers gave the game a score of 8.5/10.

Game Informer gave the game an 8.5/10, stating: "If you only know about Rayman from his affiliation with the now-ubiquitous Rabbids, that probably wasn’t the best introduction. Rayman Origins is the proper way to catch up with the character, who finally has a game that puts him squarely in the majors."

IGN gave it a 9.5/10, saying that "Rayman Origins is the best looking platformer this generation and also the most fun. A truly realized vision at the top of its genre, Rayman Origins is an extravaganza with plenty of action to keep it fresh from start to finish and beyond,"

Joystiq gave the game 5 stars out of 5, saying it "embodies the kind of creativity and craftsmanship that have been largely missing in 2D platfomers since their heyday in the 16-bit era."

Nintendo Life awarded it a 10/10 and called it "The very pinnacle of 2D platforming and undoubtedly one of the Wii’s very best games". Nintendo Power gave the game a score of 9.5/10, calling it 'a platforming masterpiece.'

VideoGamer.com gave the game 8 out of 10, stating: "A passionate tribute to the days when platform games ruled the Earth, but beyond that, it's also one of the best examples of the genre we've had in recent memory."

The Nintendo 3DS version was particularly criticized for its technical issues and lack of content, such as multiplayer and a level, "Get Away!". However, it was praised for retaining its enjoyable controls, art style, and 3D effect.

=== Awards ===
GameSpot named Rayman Origins "Best Platformer of 2011". IGN nominated Rayman Origins for "Game Of The Year". Giant Bomb named Rayman Origins the tenth best game of 2011. During the 15th Annual Interactive Achievement Awards, the Academy of Interactive Arts & Sciences nominated Rayman Origins for "Outstanding Achievement in Animation" and "Outstanding Achievement in Art Direction".

=== Sales ===
Despite the game's positive reviews, it did not live up to its sales expectations. It sold 50,000 copies in its first month in the USA. However, Ubisoft revealed that the game has been profitable.

== Sequels and remaster ==
=== Rayman Legends ===
A sequel to Rayman Origins, titled Rayman Legends, was originally being developed exclusively for the Wii U and was planned for a release in Q1 2013. The game follows on from the gameplay of Origins whilst adding new asymmetric gameplay elements via the Wii U GamePad, as well as new characters and an improved graphics engine. The sequel was first hinted at via a marketing survey in April 2012. A leaked teaser video on YouTube confirmed the existence of the sequel, entitled Rayman Legends. It was later announced that the sequel's release was being delayed until September 2013 and would also be released for the PlayStation 3 and Xbox 360. The game was also revealed to be released on PlayStation Vita and Microsoft Windows via Steam. Later in September 2017 Ubisoft ported it to the Nintendo Switch. A reimagined remake, Rayman Legends Retold, is scheduled to be released on December 3, 2026.

=== Rayman Jungle Run ===
A mobile platformer developed by Pastagames based on the style of Rayman Origins, titled Rayman Jungle Run, was released on September 20, 2012, for iOS and on September 27, 2012, for Android devices. The Android version was developed by DotEmu. Retaining the look of Origins, Jungle Run sees Rayman automatically running through 63 levels (plus 7 Land of the Livid Dead levels) with players tasked to jump and punch through obstacles and collect as many lums as possible in each stage. Collecting all 100 lums in each stage earns a skull tooth which go towards unlocking the Land of the Livid Dead level for each world. IGN gave the game a score of 8.8, calling it "a brilliant solution to one-touch platforming." iTunes named it the iPhone game of the year. During the 16th Annual D.I.C.E. Awards, the Academy of Interactive Arts & Sciences nominated Rayman Jungle Run for "Casual Game of the Year" and "Mobile Game of the Year". A version for Windows 8, Windows RT and Windows Phone was released on March 7, 2013. A sequel, Rayman Fiesta Run, was released on November 7, 2013, featuring additional gameplay features carried over from Rayman Legends. As of January 2021, the game has been removed from Android and iOS. The Windows version, on Steam, was removed in December 2021.

=== Rayman Origins: Enhanced Edition ===
A remastered 4K 60fps version of Rayman Origins for current-gen consoles, titled Rayman Origins: Enhanced Edition, is scheduled to be released on Nintendo Switch 2, PlayStation 5, Windows, and Xbox Series X/S on December 3, 2026, and will be included with all versions of Rayman Legends Retold. It will also be available to purchase separately on December 3. Rayman Origins: Enhanced Edition contains an in-game gallery featuring original artworks and collectibles that were exclusive to the PlayStation Vita version. The game will also have quality of life improvements as well as haptic feedback with compatible controllers.
