= Amazing Learning Games with Rayman =

2000 video game

- Developer: Ubi Soft
- Publisher: Ubi Soft
- Producer: Gérard Guillemot
- Programmer: Olivier Couvreur
- Composer: Daniel Masson
- Series: Rayman
- Platforms: MS-DOS, Windows, PlayStation
- Release: Windows, MS-DOS; WW: 1996; Rayman Learning Center; WW: 1999; PlayStation; WW: August 9, 2001
- Genre: Education
- Mode: Single-player

Amazing Learning Games with Rayman, also released under different titles, is an educational video game developed and published by Ubi Soft. It is a spin-off entry in the Rayman series. Players control Rayman, who must retrieve the Magic Book of Knowledge from Mr. Dark. The game features levels in mathematics and phonics involving spelling, word recognition, number recognition and arithmetic.

The game was distributed in different configurations and under different titles depending on the region and platform. The original educational content was divided into three difficulty levels corresponding to different age groups. In the United Kingdom, these levels were released as separate titles, under the names Maths and English with Rayman for MS-DOS and Windows and Rayman Junior for PlayStation. In the United States, in addition to the Rayman Learning Center series for MS-DOS and Windows, Amazing Learning Games with Rayman and Rayman Brain Games were released as single games combining all three difficulty levels.

Since its release in 1996 for MS-DOS and Windows, the game has been received mixed reception. Reviewers praised its experience, gameplay and visuals, though with common criticism being that it had sound and educational issues resulting in no educational impact on players.

== Gameplay and premise ==
It is an educational game with platformer elements which the player control as Rayman. The game features twelve levels in mathematics and phonics, and three difficulty modes for each. The levels will include spelling, word recognition, number recognition and arithmetic. The player could replay a level with the questions reset, but the player cannot replay it once it is completed. In order to complete the game, all levels must be completed. The player can lose lives and halt progress for each wrong answer. The game's premise involves Rayman retrieving the Magic Book of Knowledge, which has been stolen by Mr. Dark. Besides Rayman and Mr. Dark, other characters featured in the game include Betilla the Fairy and the Magician who both of them guide the player. The player could practice their actions at Betilla's Garden.

== Release and reception ==
In the United States, the game was originally published as Amazing Learning Games with Rayman for the MS-DOS and Windows in 1996, and Rayman Learning Center with three volumes in 1999. The game would be released for the PlayStation on August 9, 2001.

It has received mixed reception since its release. Writer Bonnie James felt that the game mixed educational elements with gameplay well and that kids who enjoy playing games will enjoy it, though they noted that kids who are not skilled at games might not maximize enjoyment. James went on to praise the game's aesthetic, conceptual variety, and the quality of its visuals. They felt that it should have more choices to what players can do from the beginning, comparing the idea to how one can do questions out of order on a test. Active Learning Associates praised it for its addictive, action-oriented gameplay. Peggy Berg of CNET noted how the game's plot and gameplay could fascinate players despite its nonviolent approach. Berg also note that young players might benefit from its educational features though pointing out features the players may not understand. Writer Jennifer Beam felt that its experience may captivate players, but noted that its educational elements developed too slowly and criticised sound issues, which may hamper a child's ability to hear instructions or questions clearly. Author George Kalmpourtzis noted that the educational approach of "modifying and extending their game mechanisms" that the game takes is a risky one, arguing that such games can result in no educational impact on players. He went on to argue that such a game does not lend itself to being used in classrooms due to being unhelpful as educational games. Writer Andrzej Sitek felt that it was an interesting approach to platform games, commenting on their issues with children's educational video games being unrefined.
