= Rayman Raving Rabbids (handheld game) =

2006 video game

- European Nintendo DS cover art
- Developers: Visual Impact Productions (GBA); Ubisoft Casablanca (DS)
- Publisher: Ubisoft
- Series: Rayman
- Platforms: Game Boy Advance, Nintendo DS
- Release: Game Boy Advance: NA: November 14, 2006; AU: December 7, 2006; EU: December 8, 2006; Nintendo DS: NA: March 6, 2007; AU: March 15, 2007; EU: March 16, 2007
- Genre: Platform
- Mode: Single-player

Rayman Raving Rabbids (French: Rayman contre les Lapins Crétins) is a 2006 platform game developed and published by Ubisoft for the Game Boy Advance and Nintendo DS. It was the handheld version of the party video game Rayman Raving Rabbids.

== Gameplay ==
Unlike its home console counterpart, Rayman Raving Rabbids is a 2D side-scrolling platformer, similar in gameplay to Rayman (1995). The player controls Rayman, who initially limited to jumping, climbing and attacking. Throughout the game, he collects outfits with different abilities. The game features 25 stages.

== Plot ==
Similarly to its home console counterpart, the Rabbids started attacking Rayman's world in revenge for other species who had chased and insulted them, resulting in them disappearing for some time. They kidnapped Rayman and put him into a jail cell. Rayman was able to find an innovative way in order to defeat the Rabbids by wearing various disguises.

== Reception ==
Reception

Aggregate score
Aggregator	Score
Metacritic	DS: 56/100

Review scores
Publication	Score
GameSpot	GBA: 5.3/10; DS: 5.9/10
IGN	DS: 6.5/10

Rayman Raving Rabbids received mixed reception upon its release. GameSpot writer Alex Navarro criticized the game's adventure elements, controls, and level designs, which he felt it often little gameplay. He also criticized how all the levels are not challenging, with enemies not appearing frequently, bosses being easy to defeat, and reused obstacles. He wrote that the Rabbids were degenerated to generic antagonists.

Navarro commented that the Nintendo DS version had unsightly graphics, and it was too short. IGN wondered why the version played so well, but looked so awful.
