= Rayman Legends Retold =

Upcoming platform video game

- Developers: Ubisoft Milan; Ubisoft Montpellier
- Publisher: Ubisoft
- Composers: Christophe Héral; Grant Kirkhope
- Series: Rayman
- Engine: Snowdrop
- Platforms: Nintendo Switch 2; PlayStation 5; Windows; Xbox Series X/S
- Release: December 3, 2026
- Genre: Platform
- Modes: Single-player, multiplayer

Rayman Legends Retold is an upcoming platform game developed by Ubisoft Milan and Ubisoft Montpellier and published by Ubisoft. It is a reimagined remake of Rayman Legends (2013), the fifth main title of the Rayman series, and is scheduled for release on December 3, 2026 for Nintendo Switch 2, PlayStation 5, Windows, and Xbox Series X/S.

== Gameplay ==
Rayman Legends Retold retains the side-scrolling platform gameplay of Rayman Legends, while rebuilding the presentation with 3D visuals in the Snowdrop engine. The game supports up to four-player local cooperative play, with Rayman, Globox, Grand Minimus, and Barbara returning as playable characters.

The remake adds new levels, a new sixth realm, four new musical stages, dragon-riding sequences, the return of the Cave of Bad Dreams, and Cave of Trials challenges. Kung Foot, the football-based local multiplayer mode from the original game, returns with revised controls, power-ups, and customizable rules. Game Informer described the dragon-riding stages as new 3D sequences that connect the end of one world to the beginning of another, similar to Rayman Origins.

== Premise ==
The game is set in the Glade of Dreams, where Rayman, Globox, Barbara, Grand Minimus, and Murfy travel across different realms after a new villain spreads chaos and corruption through the world. Unlike the original Rayman Legends, the remake includes a new story, fully voiced cinematics, and expanded character interactions.

== Development ==
Rayman Legends Retold is co-developed by Ubisoft Milan and Ubisoft Montpellier. Production director Alessandro Arndt Mucchi said the collaboration arose after the two studios met "almost by chance" at a Ubisoft event and discovered that both wanted to make a Rayman game, comparing the encounter to the Spider-Man pointing meme. He said Rayman Legends was chosen because of its popularity, tight gameplay, and variety of content. Brand producer Loïc Gounon said the remake was intended to retell Rayman Legends for a new generation, expand the series' lore and world logic, and provide a foundation for the future of the Rayman franchise.

The soundtrack includes new music by Christophe Héral, who had composed the original Rayman Legends, and Grant Kirkhope. Ubisoft Milan production director Alessandro Arndt Mucchi said Kirkhope's musical style suited the humorous tone of Rayman, while animation director Marco Renso said Kirkhope worked with Héral on new compositions for the remake. The remake also introduces full voice-acting, including David Gasman as Rayman and Billy West as Murfy, both reprising their roles from Rayman 3: Hoodlum Havoc.

=== Technology ===
The original Rayman Legends was developed in the 2.5D UbiArt Framework for seventh and eighth generation consoles. Rayman Legends Retold instead uses Ubisoft's own Snowdrop engine which could automatically convert the original 2.5D structures into 3D. The remake still uses a two-dimensional gameplay structure beneath its 3D staging.

Rayman Legends was originally announced as a Wii U console exclusive in 2013 with the game being built around the console's GamePad touch controls before plans changed. As such, Ubisoft felt that a new Rayman title could not skip releasing on a Nintendo console. They had already begun work on Rayman Legends Retold before hearing details about the Nintendo Switch 2 ahead of its official reveal. Ubisoft Montpellier tech director Thibaut Assandri said the team were initially worried that the game could not run on Switch 2 due to the quality and detail of the assets they had already developed as the game was already pushing the much more technically capable PlayStation 5. They contacted the team at Ubisoft Berlin who had also worked on the Switch 2 port of Star Wars Outlaws, based on the same Snowdrop engine. Star Wars Outlaws ran on the system at a capped 30 FPS with ray tracing but Ubisoft wanted to push their Snowdrop engine for Rayman Legends Retold to run with ray tracing at 60 FPS instead. To meet their frame rate target, they lowered the internal resolution to save GPU resources. In handheld mode, it is rendered at a 480p internal resolution with DLSS upscaling to a 1080p output resolution. When docked, the game outputs 4K resolution. Ubisoft wanted the Switch 2 version to achieve content parity with other platforms with visual quality comparable to Xbox Series S.

== Release ==
Rayman Legends Retold is scheduled for release on 3 December 2026 for Nintendo Switch 2, PlayStation 5, Windows, and Xbox Series X/S. Ubisoft also announced cloud availability through GeForce Now and Blacknut. Ubisoft stated that Rayman Legends Retold would not replace the original Rayman Legends which would be "staying put" and won't be delisted from digital storefronts.

The standard edition includes Rayman Origins: Enhanced Edition, an updated version of the 2011 game with 4K resolution, 60 frames-per-second support, new collectibles, rewards, and quality-of-life changes. Rayman Origins: Enhanced Edition is also planned as a standalone purchase on the same date.

Rayman Legends Retold was originally slated for a release date of 1 October 2026, but was delayed to 3 December of the same year, with Ubisoft stating that they "decided to take extra time to make sure every detail gets the care it deserves".

Version-exclusive costumes are also planned, such as an Astro Bot-inspired costume for the PlayStation 5 version, a Rabbids-inspired costume for the Switch 2 version, and a costume inspired by the Vortex Fist power-up from Rayman 3 for the Xbox Series X/S version.

== Accolades ==
Rayman Legends Retold won Best Nintendo Switch 2 Game at Gamescom 2026.

== Future ==
When asked why Ubisoft decided to remake Rayman Legends, Rayman brand producer Loïc Gounon said that Rayman Legends Retold was intended to serve as a foundation for the future of the franchise. In a separate interview with GamesRadar+, Gounon said Ubisoft believed it might be time to return to more adventurous 3D Rayman games, adding that such a direction was the plan "if everything goes well". TheGamer, citing a leaker who had revealed the remake before its official announcement, reported that development of Rayman 4 would depend on how well Rayman Legends Retold performs financially.
