= Ubisoft Montpellier =

French video game developer

- Formerly: Ubi Pictures (1994–2003); Ubisoft Pictures (2003)
- Type: Subsidiary
- Industry: Video games
- Founded: 1994; 32 years ago in Carnon, France
- Founders: Michel Ancel; Frédéric Houde
- Headquarters: Castelnau-le-Lez, France
- Key people: Frédéric Houde (technical director)
- Revenue: 34,302,900 euro (2021)
- Net income: 1,401,900 euro (2021)
- Number of employees: 350 (2019)
- Parent: Ubisoft
- Website: ubisoft.com/en-us/studio/montpellier

Ubisoft Montpellier is a French video game developer and a studio of Ubisoft based in Castelnau-le-Lez. Founded in 1994 as Ubi Pictures, it is best known for developing the Rayman and Beyond Good & Evil series. At 350 employees as of September 2019, Ubisoft Montpellier is led by co-founder Frédéric Houde as technical director.

== History ==
Ubisoft Montpellier was founded by Michel Ancel and Frédéric Houde, two French video game designers. Houde, after obtaining a Brevet de technicien supérieur at the Lycée Jean-Mermoz in Montpellier, first met Ancel (at the time still a high school student) in 1987 at Informatique 2000, a local technology store. They co-operated on the development of video games, sometimes spending multiple hours at a time in front of their computers. Houde later went on to serve his military service, while Ancel was hired by French video game company Ubisoft (then named Ubi Soft) to work at its Montreuil-based studio as a developer. After Houde finished his service, he was also hired by Ubi Soft to aid the company in the launch of a Sega Mega Drive game. Thereby, Houde re-encountered Ancel, who by this time was developing car-centric games for Ubi Soft. However, Ancel wanted to leave the Paris area; he presented Houde with Rayman, a game he had conceptualised aged 17 and created a prototype for on his Atari ST. Ancel and Houde thus resigned from Ubi Soft and presented Rayman to the company, agreeing to develop the game as freelancers.

Subsequently, Ancel moved to Carnon in his native Montpellier area; Ubi Soft formally established a new studio out of these operations in 1994 under the name Ubi Pictures. Ancel and Houde hired three further people—Eric Pelatan, Alexandra Steible, and Olivier Soleil—to form a core team of five. All five worked remotely, exchanging data via bulletin board systems, and met with Ancel at least once per month. After Rayman was released in 1995, development on a sequel—Rayman 2: The Great Escape—began, and the team began to grow. Ubi Pictures briefly operated out of the apartment of Ancel's sister before moving to its first proper offices, located on Rue de l'Ancien Courrier in the centre of Montpellier, in 1995. These new accommodation could fit up to ten people and provided the studio with its first conference system, using which it could frequently communicate with Ubi Soft's other studios. However, the team rapidly grew, wherefore it moved to another office on the nearby Rue de l'Argenterie less than two years later in 1997; this move made room up to thirty people.

Rayman 2 was finished in 1999, allowing Ubi Pictures to relocate again, this time to a 400-years-old farm house (referred to internally as "La Villa") on Avenue de Saint-Maur, also located within the Montpellier city centre and close to the Opéra national de Montpellier. Part of La Villa became an internal sound studio that was set up in the building's attic. By December 2000, Ubi Pictures employed 25 people.

In late 2003, when the studio was known as Ubisoft Pictures, Ubisoft acquired Montpellier-based developer Tiwak and consolidated it and its 17 employees with Ubisoft Pictures, which was rebranded as Ubisoft Montpellier. By 2007, Ubisoft Montpellier's staff count had risen to 80 people, led by Xavier Poix as producer and Ancel as creative director. By July 2009, Ubisoft Montpellier and Tiwak collectively employed 250 staff members. Tiwak, as well as other Ubisoft-owned properties in the Montpellier area, were formally merged into Ubisoft Montpellier, which also adopted the "Ubisoft Montpellier" name legally, in March 2011. That same year, Ubisoft Montpellier moved to offices in the Bellegarde business park in Castelnau-le-Lez, a town neighbouring Montpellier.

In July 2014, Ancel opened an independent development studio, Wild Sheep Studio, while simultaneously remaining creative director for Ubisoft Montpellier. In May 2017, Ubisoft Montpellier announced that it was moving to new, larger offices located close to the previous location. The new offices were designed by Philippe Rubio Architectes and built specifically for Ubisoft Montpellier. At the time, the studio had 220 employees. After a two-year construction phase, the 4,500 m^{2} (48,000 sq ft) building (known as "Le Monolithe") was inaugurated on 17 September 2019; Ubisoft Montpellier had 350 employees then and planned to reach 500 within three years. A research and development project known as Uramate is financed by the regional council of Occitania, which granted the studio €1.87 million in September 2019.

Ancel left Ubisoft Montpellier, as well as Wild Sheep Studio and the video game industry in general, in September 2020 to work with a wildlife sanctuary. This move came about in the midst of widespread departures of high-profile employees at Ubisoft due to various misconduct allegations. Ancel had been under investigation of toxic behaviour, which was reported by fifteen employees, since August 2020 but disputed these claims as "fake news" and denounced the link between them and his departure.

== Technology ==
For the development of Beyond Good & Evil (released in 2003), Ubisoft Montpellier developed a game engine known as Jade, named after the protagonist of the game. Around 2009, Ubisoft Montpellier developed the LyN engine for their game Rabbids Go Home. In response to Ubisoft Montreal's drive of developing games with photo-realistic graphics, Ubisoft Montpellier developed the UbiArt Framework engine, which the studio used for Rayman Origins, its sequel Rayman Legends, and Valiant Hearts: The Great War. For virtual reality games, such as the internally developed Space Junkies, Ubisoft Montpellier developed the Brigitte engine. For the upcoming Beyond Good and Evil 2, the studio developed an entirely new engine from scratch to integrate multiple simultaneous multiplayer and single-player systems, called Voyager engine.

== Litigation ==
In December 2012, Ubisoft Montpellier fired Alain "Gaston" Rémy, an artist of six years at the studio, over caricatures of the studio's management. Rémy insisted that the caricatures were intended to be humorous and were not publicised, and opted to challenge the firing; a French labour court was scheduled to make a decision on the matter on 26 July 2013. The court ruled in favour of Rémy and ordered Ubisoft to pay €55,000 in addition to compensation. A second, unnamed artist was also fired in 2012 for employing a "too Franco-Belgian" style; they challenged the decision and the court again ruled in favour of the artist.

== Games developed ==
| Year | Title | Platform(s) |
|---|---|---|
| 1995 | Rayman | Atari Jaguar, PlayStation, Sega Saturn, MS-DOS, Nintendo DSi |
| 1999 | Rayman 2: The Great Escape | Nintendo 64, Microsoft Windows, Dreamcast |
| 2001 | Rayman M | GameCube, Microsoft Windows, PlayStation 2, Xbox |
| 2003 | Beyond Good & Evil | GameCube, Microsoft Windows, PlayStation 2, PlayStation 3, Xbox, Xbox 360 |
| 2005 | Peter Jackson's King Kong | GameCube, Microsoft Windows, PlayStation 2, PlayStation Portable, Xbox, Xbox 360 |
| 2006 | Tom Clancy's Ghost Recon Advanced Warfighter | Xbox 360, Xbox, PlayStation 2, Microsoft Windows |
| 2006 | Rayman Raving Rabbids | Mac OS X, Microsoft Windows, PlayStation 2, Wii, Xbox 360 |
| 2009 | Rabbids Go Home | Microsoft Windows, Wii |
| 2010 | Michael Jackson: The Experience | Wii, PlayStation 3 |
| 2011 | From Dust | Microsoft Windows, PlayStation 3, Xbox 360 |
| 2011 | The Adventures of Tintin: The Secret of the Unicorn | Android, iOS, Microsoft Windows, Nintendo 3DS, PlayStation 3, Wii, Xbox 360, Symbian^3 |
| 2011 | Rayman Origins | OS X, Microsoft Windows, Nintendo 3DS, PlayStation 3, PlayStation Vita, Wii, Xbox 360 |
| 2012 | ZombiU | Microsoft Windows, PlayStation 4, Wii U, Xbox One |
| 2013 | Rayman Legends | Microsoft Windows, PlayStation 3, PlayStation 4, PlayStation Vita, Wii U, Xbox 360, Xbox One, Nintendo Switch, Google Stadia |
| 2013 | Just Dance 2014 | PlayStation 3, Wii, Wii U, Xbox 360, PlayStation 4, Xbox One |
| 2014 | Valiant Hearts: The Great War | Android, iOS, Microsoft Windows, PlayStation 3, PlayStation 4, Xbox 360, Xbox One, Nintendo Switch, Google Stadia |
| 2015 | Rayman Adventures | Android, iOS |
| 2019 | Space Junkies | Microsoft Windows, PlayStation 4 |
| 2019 | Rayman Mini | iOS, macOS (Apple Arcade) |
| 2023 | Valiant Hearts: Coming Home | Android, iOS |
| 2024 | Prince of Persia: The Lost Crown | Microsoft Windows, PlayStation 4, Xbox One, Xbox Series X/S, PlayStation 5, Nintendo Switch, Amazon Luna |
| 2026 | Rayman Legends Retold | Microsoft Windows, Xbox Series X/S, PlayStation 5, Nintendo Switch 2 |
| TBA | Beyond Good and Evil 2 | TBA |
