= Rayman Raving Rabbids =

2006 party video game

- European Wii box art
- Developers: Ubisoft Montpellier; Ubisoft Sofia (PC)
- Publisher: Ubisoft
- Directors: Patrick Bodard; Jacques Exertier; Yoan Fanise; Florent Sacré
- Producer: Pierre-Arnaud Lambert
- Artist: Florent Sacré
- Writer: Jacques Exertier
- Composer: Mark Griskey
- Series: Rayman; Rabbids
- Engine: Jade
- Platforms: Wii; PlayStation 2 Windows; Xbox 360; Mac OS X
- Release: November 19, 2006: Wii; NA: November 19, 2006; AU: December 7, 2006; EU: December 8, 2006 PlayStation 2; NA: December 5, 2006; AU: December 7, 2006; EU: December 8, 2006 Windows; AU: December 7, 2006; EU: December 8, 2006; NA: December 11, 2006 Xbox 360; EU: April 6, 2007; NA: April 24, 2007 Mac OS X; WW: November 30, 2008
- Genre: Party
- Modes: Single-player, multiplayer

Rayman Raving Rabbids (French: Rayman contre les lapins crétins) is a 2006 party video game developed by Ubisoft Montpellier and published by Ubisoft. First released for the Wii in 2006, with the various other consoles' versions, including the handheld version being released later. It is a spin-off for the Rayman series and the debut title for the Rabbids franchise.

The game was initially developed by Phoenix Interactive Entertainment, naming it tentatively Rayman 4, after finishing the PlayStation Portable port of King Kong. The game was intended to capture elements from Rayman (1995) and the sequel to Rayman 3: Hoodlum Havoc (2003) with characters expressing self-awareness of being in a video game controlled by the player of real life. After Nintendo revealed the Wii, members of Ubisoft were concerned that being a more conventional 3D platformer could negatively affect the game's sales, making the decision to restart development. A source code of Rayman 4's prototype was leaked online on 4chan in December 2022.

Rayman Raving Rabbids received generally positive reviews from critics, with praise for its frantic gameplay, humor and implementation of the Wii's features, with the other versions being less well received.

== Gameplay ==
Rayman Raving Rabbids is a party video game. Players control Rayman as he must partake in a series of minigames. On the hub world, players control Rayman from a third-person perspective where he is presented five minigames, consisting of three random minigames, a dancing rhythm game featuring pop culture songs, and another final challenge in order to proceed the story. Three minigames must be completed to proceed to the final challenge.

Each minigame plays differently, and mostly focuses on using the Wii Remote and Nunchuck (Wii) in a frantic manner to achieve the required score. Minigames can range from muscle memory games to sports to puzzles. The final challenge either features a "bunny hunt" or a "warthog race". Bunny hunts follow Rayman from a first-person perspective to shoot Rabbids with plungers and achieve a high score while maintaining their hit points. Warthog races follow Rayman as he must race a warthog and reach first place after three laps, with a limited number of boosts to help.

At the end of a day, Rayman is taken into his cell with a plunger as a reward. There the player can customize Rayman, listen to the soundtrack, view records, and replay previous minigames. Depending on the numbers of plungers obtained, the player can then reach the cell's window, ending the game. Ending a day also saves the progress. Some minigames support multiplayer features, where up to four players can partake in achieving the high score.

The PC, PS2, and Xbox 360 features button gameplay in contrary to the Wii versions. For example, the dancing minigames require pressing the trigger buttons rather than shaking the Wii Remote and Nunchuck. The Xbox 360 also features unique minigames.

== Plot ==
While Rayman is having a picnic with some of Globox's children, it is interrupted by an earthquake and the Baby Globoxes sink into the ground, only for three Rabbids to emerge. The Rabbids' commander Sergueï kidnaps Rayman and throws him in an arena with Rabbids. To survive and rescue the baby Globoxes, Rayman begrudgingly partakes in their trials. After a while, Sergueï takes him to his cell and gives him a plunger. Despite initially being hostile towards Rayman, they became bored and start to root for him instead later on, and eventually he becomes popular among the Rabbids as they cheer him. In addition, they also make his jail cell more hospitable.

After fifteen days, Rayman amasses a collection of plungers as rewards for completing the trials. By building a ladder of his plungers to reach the window and chasing away a bird who attempted to defecate on his nose, Rayman manages to escape and free himself. Once liberated, he returns to the picnic site to find sheep eating the leftovers of the picnic, only to realize he left the Baby Globoxes behind and attempts to return through one of Rabbid holes to rescue them, only to get stuck. In a post-credits scene, Rayman is still stuck in the hole through the night while the sheep lick his face.

== Development ==
In 2005, Phoenix Interactive Entertainment, a studio who also developed King Kong for the PlayStation Portable initially began development of Rayman 4. The game was intended to capture elements from the 1995 video game Rayman and the characters are self-aware that they exist inside a video game and being controlled by players from the outside world. The game used Pixar as the main source of inspiration for the plot.

The game was developed for the GameCube, PlayStation 2, and Xbox. The studio spent ten months developing it before Nintendo announced the Wii, which members of Ubisoft worried that the seventh generation consoles could give negative effects to the performance of the game, and made the decision to restart development. A source code of Rayman 4's prototype was leaked online on 4chan on December 24, 2022, with fans of the Rayman series quickly obtaining the files.

== Reception ==
Reception

Aggregate score
| Aggregator | Score |
|---|---|
| Metacritic | Wii: 76/100; PS2: 64/100; PC: 58/100; X360: 67/100 |

Review scores
| Publication | Score |
|---|---|
| GameSpot | 8/10 (Wii); 7.1/10 (X360) |
| IGN | 8.3/10 (Wii); 5/10 (Win) |

Award
| Publication | Award |
|---|---|
| Academy of Interactive Arts & Sciences | Family Game of the Year and Outstanding Achievement in Animation |

Rayman Raving Rabbids received generally positive reviews from critics. IGN writer Matt Casamassina complimented the game's impressive sense of humor and a heavy emphasis on fun, as well as the design of the Rabbids and the game in general. Reviewers in general found these versions to play at an inferior level to the Wii version due to the game's controls having been optimized with the Wii in mind. GameSpot also echoed these thoughts, praising the game's creativity, implementation of the Wii's features as well as the game's soundtrack, though they admitted that the Xbox 360 version was inferior due to its controls.

== Legacy ==
Following the game's positive success, two further sequels were released, Rayman Raving Rabbids 2 and Rayman Raving Rabbids: TV Party in 2007 and 2008, after TV Party, Ubisoft abandoned the Rayman title and character beginning with the 2009 game Rabbids Go Home.

In October 2017, series' creator Michel Ancel posted on Instagram that he wants Rayman 4 to happen.
