= Rayman =

Platform game series

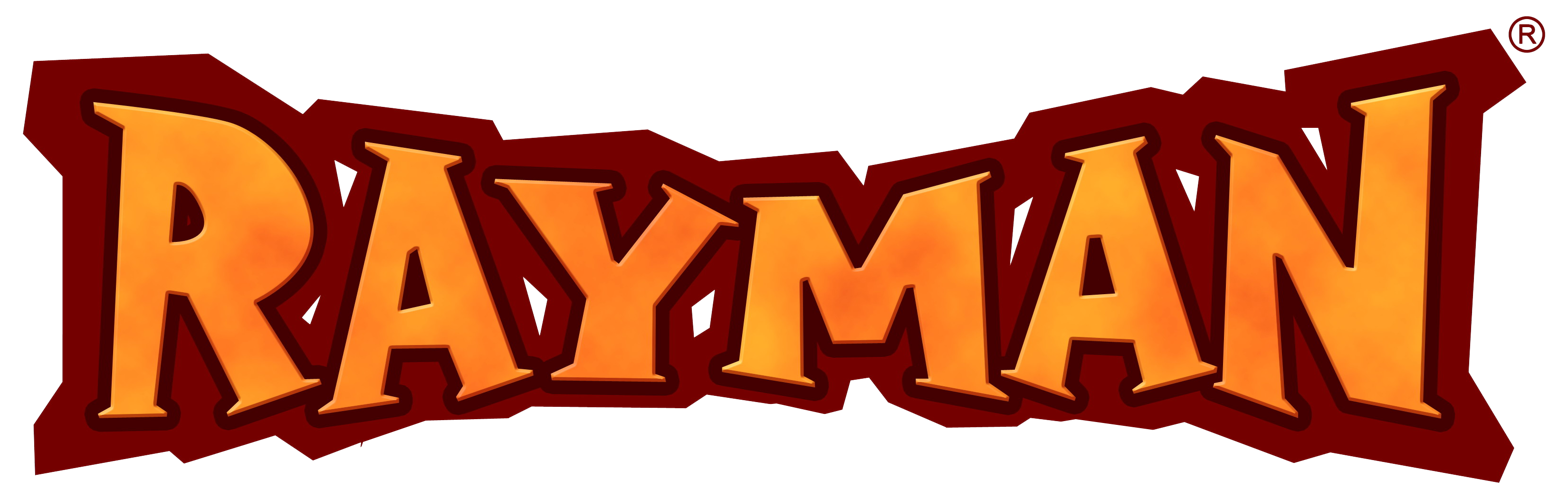
- Primary logo from 2011 to 2026
- Genre: Platformer
- Developers: Ubisoft Montpellier; Ubisoft Sofia; Ubisoft Casablanca; Ubisoft Milan; Ubisoft Paris; Ubisoft Bucharest; Ubisoft Shanghai
- Publishers: Feral Interactive; Gameloft; Nintendo; Ubisoft
- Creator: Michel Ancel
- Platform: List: Android; Atari Jaguar; Dreamcast; DSiWare; Game Boy Advance; Game Boy Color; GameCube; iOS; Microsoft Windows; MS-DOS; N-Gage; Nokia Communicator; Nintendo 3DS; Nintendo 64; Nintendo DS; Nintendo Switch; Nintendo Switch 2; OS X; Palm OS; PlayStation (PS1); PlayStation Classic; PlayStation 2; PlayStation 3; PlayStation 4; PlayStation 5; PlayStation Portable; PlayStation Vita; Sega Saturn; Wii; Wii U; Xbox; Xbox 360; Xbox One; Xbox Series X/S
- First release: Rayman; September 7 1995
- Latest release: Rayman Legends Retold; December 3 2026
- Spin-offs: Rabbids

Rayman is a platform game series created by Michel Ancel for Ubisoft. It follows its protagonist character Rayman, a magical limbless creature, being renowned for his courage and determination who, with the help of his friends, must save his world from various villains. The series is set in a fantastical, magical world which features a wide range of environments that are very often based on certain themes, such as "the Eraser Plains", a landscape made entirely of stationery, or "Fiesta De Los Muertos/Mystic Mesa", based on Mexican tradition. The series began with the release of the first Rayman in 1995 and has since produced multiple games across multiple systems, as well as several spin-off titles in other, non-platforming genres.

== Characters ==
=== Main characters ===
- Rayman is the protagonist of the series. He is a human-like creature who has no limbs, though he has hands, feet, and a head that are able to move independently from his body. He can use his hair as helicopter blades for means of transportation, throw his fists to punch from a distance, and in some games, even project balls of energy from his hands. He was voiced by Steven Perkinson in the 1995 video game of the same name. He was voiced by Billy West in Rayman: The Animated Series, where he was given a Boston accent. He was voiced by David Gasman in multiple games from 1999 to 2008. He has been voiced by Douglas Rand in the Rayman series since Rayman Origins, and was voiced by David Menkin in the 2023 adult animated series Captain Laserhawk: A Blood Dragon Remix.
- Globox is a toad-like creature who is Rayman's dimwitted best friend and sidekick. Although easily frightened, he has often demonstrated his courage and has a heart of gold. However, from Rayman M and onward, he is no longer cowardly. He and his wife Uglette have over 650 children. For his speaking role, in Rayman 2, he is voiced by Christian Erickson, but in Rayman 3 he is voiced by John Leguizamo.
- Grand Minimus is the king of Teensies, magical creatures created to protect the Heart of the world. In Rayman 2, after Rayman saves four Teensies, with one being the Grand Minimus, they're having trouble remembering who is the king. Grand Minimus is a playable character from Rayman Origins onward.
- Goth Teensy is a playable character from Rayman Origins onward. He is the guardian of the door to the Land of the Livid Dead to keep them from coming to the surface – however, he and his friends' snoring eventually annoy them to the point where they invade the Glade of Dreams.
- Barbara is a spunky, red-haired young woman and a princess warrior who first appeared in Rayman Legends, becoming the first human being to be playable in the main series – simultaneously with a younger sister and eight barbarian princess cousins who can be rescued throughout Legends. She is armed with a flail battle axe, whose head can be launched forward from the shaft to strike foes from a distance, and uses a magical winged helmet to float through the air, mimicking Rayman's helicopter hair ability. She returns in Rayman Legends Retold, this time fully voice-acted and with a 3D design faithful to the original 2D one.

=== Supporting characters ===
- Betilla the Fairy is a benevolent fairy and, in a sense, Rayman's "mother". After failing to stop Mr. Dark from stealing the Great Protoon, Betilla assists him in his quest by granting him various new abilities as the game progresses. Betilla reappears in a similar role – and with a new humanoid, curvaceous design – in Rayman Origins, where it is revealed she was the one who created Rayman and that she also has five sisters, who may also have contributed to the aforementioned event. She returns in Rayman Legends Retold, this time fully voice-acted and with a realistic, goddess-like 3D design.
  - Holly Luya, the fairy of the Desert of Dijiridoos and one of Betilla's sisters.
  - Edith Up, the fairy of the Gourmand Land and one of Betilla's sisters.
  - Annetta Fish, the fairy of the Sea of Serendipity and one of Betilla's sisters.
  - Helena Handbasket, the fairy of the Mystical Pique and one of Betilla's sisters.
  - Voodoo Mama or Fée de la Mort, the fairy of the Land of the Livid Dead and one of Betilla's sisters, she was transformed into a multi-eyed tentacled monster, Big Mama, by one of the Bubble Dreamer's nightmares which Rayman must defeat to return her back to normal.
- Ly the Fairy is a benevolent fairy, an ally of Rayman who assists him through the course of the second game and in the other versions of Rayman 3 (e.g. Game Boy Advance) and Rayman Raving Rabbids (e.g. Game Boy Advance). She has an assortment of magical powers. According to the official site of Rayman 2, Ly and Rayman are in love.
- Murfy is a green bottle fly who serves as a guide to Rayman. He has a snarky, sarcastic nature, unable to deal with failure. He appears to be bored with his job and cannot be bothered with trivial details. His race is depicted as mischievous and described as "cultivated hedonist". He first appears in Rayman 2: The Great Escape. He would appear in Rayman 3: Hoodlum Havoc, and in Rayman Legends as an assist character for the Wii U Gamepad. He was voiced by Pierre-Alain de Garrigues in Rayman 2: The Great Escape, David Gasman for Rayman M, Billy West for Rayman 3: Hoodlum Havoc and Douglas Rand for Rayman Origins and outwards.
- The Teensies are a magical race of ancient, diminutive and wise creatures created by Polokus, typically recognizable by their large and long noses.
- Polokus, also known as the Bubble Dreamer in Rayman Origins and Legends, is a divine being and, according to Rayman 2, is the creator of Rayman's world. During the plot of Rayman 2, Polokus is sleeping and can only be awoken with four masks that Rayman is tasked with collecting. He later got redesigned in Rayman Origins, where he appears larger, a little more amphibious and elderly while blowing bubbles with a hookah or pipe.
- The Captain, an adventurous and good pirate introduced in Rayman Adventures where he requires Rayman and Barbara's help to rescue Incrediballs from enemy hands.
- Rabbids, lunatic and psychotic rabbits first introduced in Rayman Raving Rabbids, they mainly appear to be white anthropomorphic rabbits with blue eyes (which turn red when getting aggressive). They are also not very smart at times and usually use plungers as weapons; despite this, they are a very advanced species capable of creating giant robots and time machines, and reproduce with the use of science. They went on to star in their own spin-off series of party games.

=== Antagonists ===
- Mr. Dark is Rayman's archenemy, the main antagonist of the first game and the main antagonist of the series overall. In the first game, he stole the Great Protoon and by doing so threw the world into chaos and Rayman went after him to bring it back. He later kidnapped Betilla who was helping Rayman by giving him powers. Rayman faced him and defeated him. In Rayman Origins, although he is absent, his influence inspired the Magician to become a villain and his successor, as seen in the E3 2011 trailer of Rayman Origins and in the level "The Reveal" of the same game (with various references and clues such as various drawings depicting Mr. Dark, a sign with "Love Mr. D." written on it, and the same hat worn by the Magician disguised as Mr. Dark in the aforementioned trailer exposed on a shelf). He later reappears for a mode in Rayman Mini.
- Admiral Razorbeard is the leader of the Robo-Pirates and the main antagonist of Rayman 2: The Great Escape. He invades Rayman's world and captured its inhabitants and destroyed the Heart of the World, causing Rayman to lose his powers. Throughout the game he tries to prevent Rayman from getting the four masks and awakening Polokus, who can destroy his troops on the land. At the end of the game, Razorbeard uses a robot called Grolgoth to fight Rayman. After his defeat he sets Grolgoth to self destruct while he escapes. Razorbeard returns as the main antagonist of the Game Boy Advance version of Rayman 3, where he kidnaps Globox to harness the energy of the Black Lum he has swallowed. He is voiced by Ken Starcevic in the PlayStation version of the game, and by Matthew Géczy in other ports. and by Carlos Alazraqui in The Animated Series.
- André is a Black Lum and the main antagonist of Rayman 3: Hoodlum Havoc. He was created after Rayman's hands accidentally scared a Red Lum while he was sleeping, and since then he has been creating more Black Lums. He was accidentally eaten by Globox. At the end of the game he teamed up with Reflux (an enemy Rayman encountered along the way) to defeat him, but was ultimately defeated and turned back to normal. André returns as the main antagonist of Rayman: Hoodlums' Revenge, as a part of his spirit remained in Globox after he was swallowed and extracted out of him. He slowly started to possess Globox, causing him to become mean, but is eventually expelled out of him. He is voiced by Ken Starcevic.
- The Magician or the Dark Teensy is a supporting character to secondary antagonist of the series, serving as the main antagonist of Rayman Origins and Rayman Legends. In unused dialogue for Rayman Origins, he was also known with the name Ales Mansay.

== Games ==
=== Main series ===
Release timeline
1995	Rayman
1996
1997
1998
1999	Rayman 2: The Great Escape
2000
2001
2002
2003	Rayman 3: Hoodlum Havoc
2004
2005
2006
2007
2008
2009
2010
2011	Rayman Origins
2012	Rayman Jungle Run
2013	Rayman Legends
2013	Rayman Legends Beatbox
2013	Rayman Fiesta Run
2014
2015	Rayman Adventures
2016
2017
2018
2019	Rayman Mini
2020
2021	Rayman's Incrediballs Dodge
2022
2023
2024
2025
2026	Rayman Legends Retold
2026	Rayman Origins: Enhanced Edition

Game	Details
Rayman Original release dates: EU: 1 September 1995; NA: 7 September 1995	Release years by system: 1995 - Atari Jaguar, PlayStation, Sega Saturn, MS-DOS; 2001 - Game Boy Advance; 2002 - Nokia Communicator; 2009 - Nintendo DSi; 2016 - iOS, Android
Rayman Original release dates: EU: 1 September 1995; NA: 7 September 1995	Notes: Developed by Ubisoft Montpellier.; A PC version titled Rayman Gold was released with additional features including levels, online features, and level creator Rayman Designer.; A version was released on the Game Boy Advance titled Rayman Advance.; A port by Gameloft was released for Symbian-based Nokia Communicator models.; Rayman Advance was re-released for Wii U Virtual Console in 2017.; Part of the lineup of the 20 games that come pre-loaded on the PlayStation Classic.; The PlayStation, Jaguar, MS-DOS, Game Boy Color and GBA versions of the game were all released and remastered on modern platforms as part of Rayman 30th Anniversary Edition on the 13th of February, 2026.
Rayman 2: The Great Escape Original release dates: EU: 22 October 1999; NA: 4 November 1999	Release years by system: 1999 - Nintendo 64, Microsoft Windows; 2000 - Dreamcast, PlayStation, PlayStation 2; 2005 - Nintendo DS; 2010 - iOS; 2011 - Nintendo 3DS; 2025 - Nintendo Classics
Rayman 2: The Great Escape Original release dates: EU: 22 October 1999; NA: 4 November 1999	Notes: Developed by Ubisoft Montpellier.; The first 3D Rayman game.; An updated remake was released for the PlayStation 2, titled Rayman Revolution. This version added upgraded graphics, the inclusion of new areas, bosses, and mini-games.; A port of the Nintendo 64 version was released for the Nintendo DS, titled Rayman DS.; A port of the Dreamcast version was released for the Nintendo 3DS, titled Rayman 3D.; Rereleased on the Nintendo Switch and Nintendo Switch 2 through the Nintendo Classics Nintendo 64 library on December 17, 2025.
Rayman 3: Hoodlum Havoc Original release dates: NA: 21 February 2003; EU: 4 March 2003	Release years by system: 2003 - GameCube, PlayStation 2, Xbox, Microsoft Windows; 2004 - Mac OS X 2012 - PlayStation 3, Xbox 360
Rayman 3: Hoodlum Havoc Original release dates: NA: 21 February 2003; EU: 4 March 2003	Notes: Developed by Ubisoft Montpellier.; The sequel to Rayman 2.; Re-released in HD for PlayStation Network and Xbox Live Arcade in 2012, titled Rayman 3 HD.
Rayman Origins Original release dates: NA: 15 November 2011; AU: 24 November 2011; EU: 25 November 2011	Release years by system: 2011 - PlayStation 3, Wii, Xbox 360; 2012 - Microsoft Windows, Nintendo 3DS, PlayStation Vita; 2013 - OS X 2026 - Microsoft Windows, Nintendo Switch 2, PlayStation 5, Xbox Series X/S
Rayman Origins Original release dates: NA: 15 November 2011; AU: 24 November 2011; EU: 25 November 2011	Notes: Developed by Ubisoft Montpellier, Ubisoft Paris, and Ubisoft Casablanca.; The first original 2D Rayman game since the first Rayman.; Remastered and rereleased in 2026 under the title Rayman Origins: Enhanced Edition.
Rayman Legends Original release dates: AU: 29 August 2013; EU: 30 August 2013; NA: 3 September 2013	Release years by system: 2013 - Microsoft Windows, PlayStation 3, Wii U, Xbox 360, PlayStation Vita; 2014 - PlayStation 4, Xbox One; 2017 - Nintendo Switch; 2021 - Stadia
Rayman Legends Original release dates: AU: 29 August 2013; EU: 30 August 2013; NA: 3 September 2013	Notes: Developed by Ubisoft Montpellier.; The direct sequel to Rayman Origins.; An updated version, titled Rayman Legends: Definitive Edition, was released for Nintendo Switch in 2017.
Rayman Legends Retold Original release date: WW: 3 December 2026	Release years by system: 2026 - Microsoft Windows, Nintendo Switch 2, PlayStation 5, Xbox Series X/S
Rayman Legends Retold Original release date: WW: 3 December 2026	Notes: Co-developed by Ubisoft Montpellier and Ubisoft Milan.; A remake of Rayman Legends, which adds new visuals, new levels, new mini-games, new soundtrack, and full voice acting.; The first standalone console Rayman game since the original Legends

=== Spin-offs ===
==== Raving Rabbids ====
Release timeline
2006	Rayman Raving Rabbids
2007	Rayman Raving Rabbids 2
2008	Rayman Raving Rabbids: TV Party
2009
2010
2011
2012
2013
2014
2015
2016
2017
2018
2019
2020
2021
2022	Mario + Rabbids Sparks of Hope

Game	Details
Rayman Raving Rabbids Original release dates: NA: 19 November 2006; AU: 7 December 2006; EU: 8 December 2006	Release years by system: 2006 - Wii, PlayStation 2, Microsoft Windows, OS X 2007 - Xbox 360
Rayman Raving Rabbids Original release dates: NA: 19 November 2006; AU: 7 December 2006; EU: 8 December 2006	Notes: Developed by Ubisoft Montpellier and Ubisoft Sofia.; The console versions are minigame-based party games, with the Wii version taking advantage of the motion control capabilities of the Wii Remote.; The Wii version of Rayman Raving Rabbids was re-released on the Wii U eShop in 2017.
Rayman Raving Rabbids (handheld game) Original release dates: NA: 14 November 2006; AU: 7 December 2006; EU: 8 December 2006	Release years by system: 2006 - Game Boy Advance
Rayman Raving Rabbids (handheld game) Original release dates: NA: 14 November 2006; AU: 7 December 2006; EU: 8 December 2006	Notes: The Game Boy Advance version is notably different from the console versions, being that it is a 2D platformer developed using the same engine as the Game Boy Advance port of Rayman 3. This version includes characters from previous Rayman games that do not appear in the console versions.; Both the Game Boy Advance and DS version are based on a canceled Raving Rabbids prototype known as Rayman 4.
Rayman Raving Rabbids (handheld game) Original release dates: NA: 6 March 2007; AU: 15 March 2007; EU: 16 March 2007	Release years by system: 2007 - Nintendo DS
Rayman Raving Rabbids (handheld game) Original release dates: NA: 6 March 2007; AU: 15 March 2007; EU: 16 March 2007	Notes: The DS version is also notably different as it combines parts of platforming and party game elements. This version uses the same engine as Rayman DS.; Both the Game Boy Advance and DS version are based on a canceled Raving Rabbids prototype known as Rayman 4.
Rayman Raving Rabbids 2 Original release dates: NA: 13 November 2007; AU: 15 November 2007; EU: 16 November 2007	Release years by system: 2007 - Wii, Microsoft Windows
Rayman Raving Rabbids 2 Original release dates: NA: 13 November 2007; AU: 15 November 2007; EU: 16 November 2007	Notes: Developed by Ubisoft Paris.; The sequel to Rayman Raving Rabbids.
Rayman Raving Rabbids 2 Original release dates: NA: 13 November 2007; EU: 16 November 2007; AU: 22 November 2007	Release years by system: 2007 - Nintendo DS
Rayman Raving Rabbids 2 Original release dates: NA: 13 November 2007; EU: 16 November 2007; AU: 22 November 2007	Notes: Developed by Ubisoft Casablanca.; The sequel to Rayman Raving Rabbids.; Unlike the DS version of Rayman Raving Rabbids, the DS version of Rayman Raving Rabbids 2 is primarily a party game like the Wii version.
Rayman Raving Rabbids: TV Party Original release dates: EU: 13 November 2008; AU: 14 November 2008; NA: 18 November 2008	Release years by system: 2008 - Wii
Rayman Raving Rabbids: TV Party Original release dates: EU: 13 November 2008; AU: 14 November 2008; NA: 18 November 2008	Notes: Developed by Ubisoft Paris.; The third game in the Raving Rabbids series.; The final Rabbids game to feature Rayman until Mario + Rabbids Sparks of Hope.
Mario + Rabbids Sparks of Hope Original release date: 20 October 2022	Release years by system: 2022 - Nintendo Switch
Mario + Rabbids Sparks of Hope Original release date: 20 October 2022	Notes: Developed by Ubisoft Paris, Ubisoft Milan.; The second game in the Mario + Rabbids series.; The first appearance of Rayman since TV Party, as a downloadable content.; Rayman's first console game since Rayman Legends.

==== Other ====
Game	Details
Rayman Designer Original release dates: EU: 1997	Release years by system: 1997 - PC
Rayman Dictées Original release dates: EU: 1998	Release years by system: 1998 - PC
Rayman CP Original release dates: EU: 1999	Release years by system: 1999 - PC
Rayman Activity Centre Original release dates: EU: 1999	Release years by system: 1999 - PC
Rayman Maternelle Original release dates: EU: 1999	Release years by system: 1999 - PC
My First Rayman Original release dates: EU: 2000	Release years by system: 2000 - PC
Rayman (video game) Original release dates: NA: 29 March 2000; EU: 24 July 2000	Release years by system: 2000 - GBC
Rayman (video game) Original release dates: NA: 29 March 2000; EU: 24 July 2000	Notes: A Game Boy Color version of the first game.
Rayman Junior: English Original release dates: EU: 10 November 2000	Release years by system: 2000 - PlayStation
Rayman Junior: Level 1 Original release dates: EU: 15 December 2000	Release years by system: 2000 - PlayStation
Rayman Junior: Level 1 Original release dates: EU: 15 December 2000	Notes: UK version of Rayman Brain Games that was split into multiple games
Rayman Junior: Level 2 Original release dates: EU: 15 December 2000	Release years by system: 2000 - PlayStation
Rayman Junior: Level 2 Original release dates: EU: 15 December 2000	Notes: UK version of Rayman Brain Games that was split into multiple games
Rayman Junior: Level 3 Original release dates: EU: 12 January 2001	Release years by system: 2001 - PlayStation
Rayman Junior: Level 3 Original release dates: EU: 12 January 2001	Notes: UK version of Rayman Brain Games that was split into multiple games
Rayman Brain Games Original release dates: NA: 11 August 2001	Release years by system: 2001 - PlayStation
Rayman Brain Games Original release dates: NA: 11 August 2001	Notes: North American version of the Rayman Junior games combined.
Rayman M Original release dates: EU: 30 November 2001; NA: 24 September 2002	Release years by system: 2001 - PlayStation 2, Microsoft Windows; 2002 - GameCube, Xbox
Rayman M Original release dates: EU: 30 November 2001; NA: 24 September 2002	Notes: Titled as Rayman Arena in North America
Rayman 2 Forever Original release dates: EU: 14 December 2001; NA: 1 January 2002	Release years by system: 2001 - GBC
Rayman 2 Forever Original release dates: EU: 14 December 2001; NA: 1 January 2002	Notes: A version of Rayman 2: The Great Escape that was released for the Game Boy Color.
Rayman Rush Original release dates: EU: 8 March 2002; NA: 26 March 2002	Release years by system: 2002 - PlayStation
Rayman Rush Original release dates: EU: 8 March 2002; NA: 26 March 2002	Notes: A version of Rayman M that was released for the PlayStation.
Rayman Golf Original release dates: EU: 1 June 2002; NA: 2 July 2003	Release years by system: 2002 - Mobile
Rayman Bowling Original release dates: NA: 16 July 2003	Release years by system: 2003 - Mobile
Rayman Garden Original release date: NA: 2001	Release years by system: 2001 - Mobile
Rayman 3 Original release dates: EU: 21 February 2003; NA: 4 March 2003	Release years by system: 2003 - Game Boy Advance, N-Gage
Rayman 3 Original release dates: EU: 21 February 2003; NA: 4 March 2003	Notes: The Game Boy Advance version of Rayman 3 that focuses on Razorbeard, the main antagonist from Rayman 2, instead of the Hoodlums.
Rayman: Hoodlums' Revenge Original release dates: NA: 15 March 2005; EU: 18 March 2005	Release years by system: 2005 - Game Boy Advance
Rayman Kart Original release dates: NA: 12 March 2009	Release years by system: 2009 - BlackBerry
Rayman Jungle Run Original release dates: NA: 20 September 2012	Release years by system: 2012 - iOS, Android; 2013 - Microsoft Windows, Windows Mobile
Rayman Fiesta Run Original release dates: NA: 7 November 2013	Release years by system: 2013 - iOS, Android; 2014 - Windows Mobile, Microsoft Windows
Rayman Adventures Original release dates: NA: 5 December 2015	Release years by system: 2015 - iOS, Android
Rayman Adventures Original release dates: NA: 5 December 2015	Notes: The game servers got shut down in 26 June 2023.
Rayman Mini Original release date: NA: 19 September 2019	Release years by system: 2019 - iOS
Rayman Mini Original release date: NA: 19 September 2019	Notes: Nominated for the A-Train Award for Best Mobile Game at the New York Game Awards; Nominated for "Best Mobile Game" at the Pégases Awards 2020; The game was delisted from Apple Store on late August 2025.

=== Cancelled games ===
- Rayman (SNES) - Ancel initially produced Rayman for the Atari ST, a 16-bit personal computer system, working alone on every aspect of the game. Following Houde's arrival on the project, Ancel noticed that public interest in the ST had started to wane and looked to the Super NES CD-ROM, a CD peripheral for the 16-bit Super Nintendo Entertainment System (SNES). However, in 1993 Nintendo abandoned the project before the hardware was produced. Ancel and Houde ruled out a release for the cartridge-based SNES, doubting its ability to handle the large amount of information they wanted to incorporate into the game. The pair switched focus towards newer and more powerful consoles, leaving the SNES version of the game unfinished. This led to the decision to produce Rayman for the Atari Jaguar, a 64-bit cartridge-based system that the team felt could handle the graphics they wanted. In late 1994, magazine advertisements announced the game as a Jaguar exclusive title. Between 1993 and 1994, Rayman originally was submitted to Apogee Software by Ancel, however the publisher was scrapped.
- Rayman 2 (2D platformer) - Rayman 2 was originally conceptualised as a sidescrolling 2D platformer, like the first game. Development on the prototype began in early 1996 with a team of six people and a budget of 10 million francs. It was slated to be released on the PlayStation, Sega Saturn, and Microsoft Windows in the fourth quarter of that year. The prototype of Rayman 2 featured some usage of prerendered bitmaps of 3D computer models, differing from the hand painted presentation of its predecessor, beginning in 1998. A prototype containing a single level is playable in the final PlayStation version of the game if the player completes a certain percentage of the game.
- Rayman 4 - Two years after the release of Rayman 3: Hoodlum Havoc, Ubisoft had foreseen the development of the sequel. The initial stages of development began in 2005, with totally different concepts and without the presence of the Rabbids, and were entrusted to the studios of Phoenix Interactive. The programmers created a considerable amount of concept-artworks, of which a good part was gradually revealed to the public in the following years. These artworks show that the game should have 3D features faithful to many environments of Rayman, such as the "Land of Music" and "Picture City", as well as a new presumed return of Bad Rayman. After four months of initial production, development of the game was cancelled. It appears that the game was to be a reboot/retelling of the original Rayman game, and would have involved Rayman revisiting numerous locations from the original game recreated in 3D and to a high level of accuracy. In the book L'Histoire de Rayman, it was revealed that the Robo-Pirates and the Livingstones/Lividstones were planned to return in Rayman 4, also the evil counterpart Dark Rayman and even Mr. Dark were planned to return. There is also concept art of a young human girl named "Cielle" who was intended to appear in the game. It is unknown what her role was to be in the game or if she was intended to be playable.
- Rayman Raving Rabbids (platformer) - From the previous project a second development was started at the studio of Ubisoft Montpellier, the studio that developed the first three chapters of the series. In 2006, the second phase was again geared towards the development of a 3D platform game designed by Michel Ancel and known by the final title of Rayman Raving Rabbids. This new title, which Michel Ancel himself referred to as Rayman 4, was to be an adventure story in which Rayman teams up with his former enemy André from Rayman 3 to save the world by an army of Rabbids. In addition to the characters already appeared in previous titles, there were new ones, among which stand out an anonymous female one belonging to the same lineage as Rayman who served as damsel in distress, and a hedonistic emperor of the Rabbids. Michel Ancel also stated that in the course of history the main purpose would have consisted also in saving, in addition to the aforementioned girl, André himself and the latter's girlfriend. Gameplay innovations included attacking enemies with punches and kicks, the ability to ride creatures such as giant hawks, tarantulas, sharks, and warthogs, and in an end-of-level minigame where you had to hypnotize the Rabbids by dancing to access new areas to play. The project was supported for several months, until the developers received the Nintendo Wii development kit. With these tools, the developers experimented with further varieties of play styles and as a result the action and platform elements were removed and replaced by the final party-style version of Rayman Raving Rabbids, followed over time by new titles of the same kind. However, the Game Boy Advance and Nintendo DS versions were not generally released as a party but as a side-scrolling platform game and very similar to the gameplay of the Game Boy Advance version of Rayman 3, and the storyline is a fusion of the first two projects. On December 24, 2022 most of the assets and levels used in the prototype were leaked by an anonymous user on Internet Archive including the original designs of the Rabbids, the rideable creatures, some of the cutscenes and the levels. However, when Rayman gets hit by the Rabbids, he loses his clothes for some reason.

== Reception ==
Aggregate review scores
Game	Metacritic
Rayman	(JAG) 85% (Note: GameRankings score) (SAT) 85% (GBA) 84/100 (PC) 77% (PS1) 75% (DSi) 66% (iOS) 60%
Rayman 2: The Great Escape	(DC) 93% (PC) 91% (N64) 90/100 (PS2) 90/100 (PS1) 87% (3DS) 61/100 (NDS) 58/100 (iOS) 53/100
Rayman 3: Hoodlum Havoc	(GBA) 83/100 (GC) 77/100 (PS2) 76/100 (Xbox) 75/100 (PC) 74/100 (PS3) 72/100 (X360) 69/100
Rayman Origins	(Wii) 92/100 (Vita) 88/100 (X360) 87/100 (PS3) 87/100 (PC) 86/100 (3DS) 71/100
Rayman Legends	(WiiU) 92/100 (XOne) 91/100 (PS3) 91/100 (PS4) 90/100 (X360) 90/100 (PC) 89/100 (Vita) 87/100 (NS) 84/100

Rayman was named the Best New Character award of 1995 by Electronic Gaming Monthly. Since his debut in 1995 on the Atari Jaguar, Rayman has become a well received and recognizable video game character by players and is known for his lack of limbs.

== Other media ==
Rayman has been the subject of a short-lived animated television series in 1999, Rayman: The Animated Series, which was produced as a tie-in to the video games, though significantly different from the source material. Only four episodes were made.

In 2019, another animated TV series was announced to be in works at Ubisoft Film & Television. However, the project was scrapped in 2023.

Rayman appears as a recurring character in the 2023 adult animated series Captain Laserhawk: A Blood Dragon Remix, voiced by David Menkin.
