= Rayman (video game) =

1995 video game

- Developer: Ubi Pictures (Note: Rayman Advance and Rayman: 30th Anniversary Edition developed by Digital Eclipse; additional work for 30th Anniversary Edition by Ubisoft Montpellier, Ubisoft Montreal, Ubisoft Romania, Ubisoft Kyiv and Ubisoft Pune)
- Publisher: Ubi Soft
- Director: Agnès Haegel
- Producer: Gérard Guillemot
- Designers: Michel Ancel; Serge Hascoët; Alexandra Steible
- Programmers: Daniel Palix; Frédéric Houde; Fred Markus
- Artists: Alexandra Steible; Éric Pelatan; Sylvaine Jenny
- Composers: Rémi Gazel; Didier Lord; Stéphane Bellanger; Christophe Héral (Note: Rayman 30th Anniversary Edition Soundtrack)
- Series: Rayman
- Platforms: PlayStation: Atari Jaguar; Sega Saturn; MS-DOS; Game Boy Color; Game Boy Advance; Palm OS; Nintendo DSi; Android; iOS; Nintendo Switch; PlayStation 5; Windows; Xbox Series X/S
- Release: 7 September 1995: PlayStation; NA: 7 September 1995; EU: September 1995; Atari Jaguar; NA: 19 September 1995; Sega Saturn; EU/NA: November 1995; MS-DOS; EU: December 1995; NA: 1 April 1996; Game Boy Color; NA: 2000; Game Boy Advance; NA: 11 June 2001; EU: 22 June 2001; Palm OS; WW: 1 September 2001; Nintendo DSi; NA: 7 December 2009; Android, iOS; WW: 18 February 2016; 30th Anniversary Edition; Nintendo Switch, PlayStation 5, Windows, Xbox Series X/S; WW: 13 February 2026
- Genre: Platform
- Mode: Single-player

Rayman is a 1995 platform game developed by Ubi Pictures and published by Ubi Soft. The player controls Rayman, who must pursue Mr. Dark to recover the Great Protoon that used to keep the balance between nature and the people of Rayman's valley. The player must navigate the valley, defeat enemies with abilities gained throughout the game, and free captured Electoons, while also encountering a boss at the end of each thematic world.

Michel Ancel originally conceived Rayman as a teenager, and was later able to realise the concept after being hired by Ubi Soft in 1989. The game initially targeted the Atari ST, and then the Super NES CD-ROM, but development was moved to the Atari Jaguar after the peripheral's cancellation. Ancel incorporated several childhood memories into the design and was soon joined by a larger development team. Ubi Soft made Rayman a launch title for the PlayStation in North America and Europe to compete with Japanese platform games on the console.

Rayman was first released for the PlayStation on 7 September 1995, and shortly thereafter for the Atari Jaguar, Sega Saturn, and MS-DOS. The game received positive reviews, with praise going towards its atmosphere, visuals, and soundtrack, though some criticized its high difficulty and lack of originality. Rayman became one of the best-selling PlayStation games and would become the first entry in the Rayman series. A 30th Anniversary Edition for modern platforms featuring bonus content and a compilation of ports, including a prototype of the cancelled Super NES version, was released in February 2026 in partnership between Ubisoft and Digital Eclipse.

== Gameplay ==
Rayman prepares to attack using his "telescopic fist".

Rayman is a side-scrolling platformer. The player controls Rayman, who must navigate six thematic worlds. Each level hides six cages of captured Electoons that Rayman can free. Additionally, he can collect blue crystals, "Tings", and gain an extra life whenever he has obtained 100 of them. If the player loses their five lives, they would need to load their save file or restart the game. Rayman occasionally gains new powers, including the ability to fly, run, and hang from platforms. Modifications to his detached hands include grabbing and punching distant entities, the latter known as the "telescopic fist".

A boss must be defeated at the end of each world, requiring the use of the previously gained abilities. Rescuing all Electoons in the first five worlds grants Rayman access to the final world, the Candy Château, the hideout of the final boss, Mr Dark. When Rayman interacts with the Magician, who is hidden in various levels, he can access hidden rooms that grant him Tings or extra lives if beaten in a given time.

== Plot ==
Rayman lives in a valley that, thanks to a magical orb known as the Great Protoon, has the people and nature living in harmony. One day, Mr Dark steals the Great Protoon and defeats its guardian, Betilla the Fairy. As a result, the Electoons that used to orbit the Great Protoon scatter and many are imprisoned by villains that appear in the Great Protoon's absence. Upon Betilla's request, Rayman sets out to recover the Great Protoon and free the captured Electoons. Mr Dark observes as Betilla guides Rayman though his quest and eventually kidnaps her. Rayman, having retrieved all Electoons, confronts Mr Dark in the Candy Château. However, Mr Dark takes away Rayman's telescopic fist and traps between walls of fire that close in on him. Electoons return Rayman's fist at the last moment, such that he can defeat Mr Dark and retrieve the Great Protoon. In the epilogue, Rayman takes a vacation with his friends and former enemies.

== Development and release ==
=== Early concepts and design ===
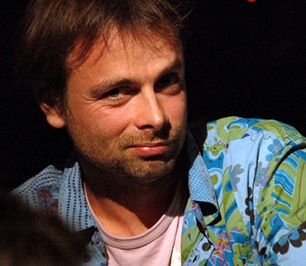
Michel Ancel (pictured in 2007), the creator and lead designer of Rayman

Rayman was created by French video game designer Michel Ancel. He conceived the character as a teenager in the 1980s, when he was learning to draw, compose music, and program to pursue his dream of making video games. In 1988, his animation skills led him to be one of the early hires for the nascent publisher Ubi Soft, which at the time was operating with from Montreuil with six developers. One of Ubi Soft's founders, Yves Guillemot, encouraged Ancel to pitch game ideas to the company leadership. He worked one his own developing a game prototype based on his concept of Rayman for the Atari ST, including six months spent on building an animation system. He teamed up with Frédéric Houde and, during a meeting with Serge Hascoët, Gérard Guillemot, Michel Guillemot, and Yves Guillemot, the duo pitched their idea using "a picture of a big, giant trombone and you had to imagine the player inside". Although the presented technology was in its research-and-development stage, Hascoët pushed for the game to enter into production, which Michel Guillemot agreed to take on.

Rayman was greenlit in 1992, and Michel Guillemot gave Ancel and his team artistic freedom. The game's style was inspired by Celtic, Chinese, and Russian fairy tales, as well as Ancel's childhood, having spent a lot of time by rivers, chasing insects, and climbing trees. When Ancel started work on the game, he began with trees and creature designs. Having become interested in rendering tools such as Autodesk 3ds Max, he chose to incorporate 60 Hz animations. Houde considered this impressive for a time where most games used sprites animated at five frames per second.

Before embarking on the creation of the settings, characters and animations, Ancel and Houde recruited the illustrator Eric Pelatan and the artist Alexandra Steible. The latter came from an animation studio and was tasked with drawing rough templates of animations and later study the results for them to be digitised. Olivier Soleil, an architecture student, was hired as a graphic designer in 1994 to work on the characters. Ancel initially envisioned a game revolving around the human boy Jimmy, who creates the online world Hereitscool. After it becomes infected with a virus, Jimmy travels into the world and inhabits the body of his in-game avatar, Rayman, to defeat it. This idea was later scrapped. Ancel defined his intent as seeking "a colourful platform game with breathtaking graphics, concrete animations, fantasy, humour and, above all, great playability". During development, four people worked on each world and the synchronisation of Rayman's attitudes.

=== Production and release ===
Rayman was developed for the Super NES CD-ROM until the peripheral was cancelled in 1993. This version was rediscovered in 2016 and released officially in 2026.

When Ancel noticed the waning public interest in the Atari ST, he pivoted the development towards the ill-fated Super NES CD-ROM drive. When Nintendo cancelled the peripheral in 1993, that version of Rayman was also scrapped. It was presumed lost until Houde rediscovered a copy dated 1992 in October 2016. With his permission, the programmer Omar Cornut released it online in July 2017.

Michel Guillemot eventually assigned additional developers to the project and allocated 15 million francs for its development. The production became split between two locations: While Ubi Soft's Montreuil headquarters continued to work on technical tasks, the creative team around Ancel and Houde worked from Ancel's hometown, Montpellier. The project's headcount grew to 100 people. The team moved the production over to the Atari Jaguar, a console they felt could handle the graphics they aimed for. Later, they decided to also bring the game to the PlayStation and the Sega Saturn due to their more capable hardware. Ubi Soft made Rayman a launch title for the North American and European releases of the PlayStation, seeking to outclass competing platformers from Japan by releasing it simultaneously with a new powerful system.

Rayman on the Jaguar was first displayed at the 1994 Summer Consumer Electronics Show. In late 1994, magazine advertisements announced Rayman as a title for the Atari Jaguar with a release in the fall or by December 1994. Pre-release promos of the PlayStation had advertised a release date of Rayman on 13 January 1995 in Japan. Later, Japanese magazines stated a release date for the PlayStation version as being June 1995. Similarly, American magazines reported a Jaguar release by June 1995, as well as versions for the 32X and 3DO, both of which were cancelled.

Rayman was released on 7 September 1995 for the PlayStation in North America. During September, it was published for the Atari Jaguar, and in November for the Sega Saturn. A version for MS-DOS was released in December 1995 in Europe and in North American in April 1996. Also in April 1996, a preview demo with the first of six worlds was released for the PlayStation and Sega Saturn.

The MS-DOS version of the game in particular later received several expansion packs. 1997's Rayman Designer (also known as Rayman's World in Europe) included a level editor alongside 24 new levels by the design team. 1998's Rayman by His Fans amassed 40 fan-made levels created through the level editor. 1999's Rayman 60 Levels contained 60 levels by designers at Ubisoft.

== Reception ==
Reception

Aggregate scores
| Aggregator | Score |
|---|---|
| GameRankings | GBA: 85% GBC: 79% |
| Metacritic | GBA: 84/100 |

Review scores
| Publication | Score |
|---|---|
| AllGame | JAG: 4.5/5; GBC: 4.5/5; SAT: 3.5/5 |
| Electronic Gaming Monthly | PS: 9/10, 7.5/10, 9/10, 9/10; JAG: 8.5/10, 7.5/10, 8/10, 8/10 |
| Famitsu | SAT: 7/10, 7/10, 7/10, 8/10; PS: 7/10, 6/10, 7/10, 7/10; GB: 26/40 |
| GameSpot | 7.4/10 |
| Next Generation | PS: 4/5; JAG: 4/5; PC: 3/5; GBA: 4/5 |
| TouchArcade | 3/5 |
| Sega Saturn Magazine | 78% |

Award
| Publication | Award |
|---|---|
| Electronic Gaming Monthly | Game of the Month |

Rayman received a generally positive reception upon release, with critics praising its animations, atmosphere, and soundtrack. Eurogamer felt there was "no shame in admitting" that it was reviewed favourably. Tommy Glide of GamePro described the game as one of the best for the Atari Jaguar and commended it as a showcase of the console's capabilities, although he considered it inferior to the PlayStation version. Electronic Gaming Monthly similarly wrote that the Atari Jaguar version was an outstanding platformer but paled against the PlayStation version due to the lower audio quality and slow responsiveness of the controls. Glide appreciated the precise controls on account of the constant jumping, ducking, and dodging involved in the gameplay. Captain Squideo, also of GamePro, commented that the PlayStation version was a "dazzling delight" and proclaimed it to be one of the most visually appealing games at the time.

Next Generation, while noting a lack of original gameplay elements, believed the game set itself apart from many other platform games and had a true sense of depth and playability. The Entertainment Weekly writer Bob Strauss felt that the game may be the one that "ennobles the adolescent world of video games" and the likes of Disney animated films like Snow White and the Seven Dwarfs. Strauss exclaimed that the game was a must-have for those with a fifth-generation video game console. Many reviewers commented on the contrast of the game's difficult gameplay to its innocent visual presentation. Sam Hickman of Sega Saturn Magazine criticised the Sega Saturn version because of what he considered an overabundance of levels that played similarly with only varied attacks or an increased difficulty used as differentiation. Hence, he regarded the game "a bit too dull a bit too often", while also being "plain irritating and damned difficult" on occasion. Game Informer, while praising its visuals, believed the game was "the height of platforming challenge", with its high difficulty making it less memorable.

Reviewers raised differing opinions on the game's graphics. The GameSpot writer Jeff Sengstack compared the game to Donkey Kong Country or Pitfall! and considered it to feature "wonderfully clever gaming elements, engaging and humorous characters, terrific music, and heaps of whimsy", although he faulted the lack of frequent save points. Lawrence Neves of GamePro felt it was what players wanted for the Sega Saturn and compared it favourably to previous platformers, such as Bug! and Astal. He noted that, while the graphics and music seemed childish at times, the challenge targeted experienced players. Neves regarded the lush visuals as impeccable and made particular note of the version's level transition effects. Next Generation praised the game's graphics, optimisation, challenge variety, and charming player character, and said the game made a good change of pace from other PC releases. The magazine considered the Atari Jaguar version impeccable, saying that "with its vast color palette, detailed sound effects, and overall playability, there is nothing about Rayman for the Jaguar that falls below the mark of excellent".

=== Sales ===
By the end of 1995, 400,000 copies of Rayman had been sold in Europe. The game sold 900,000 copies globally by 1997. It was the all-time best-selling PlayStation game in the United Kingdom, while in France it had sold 670,000 copies by 2000, becoming the second-best-selling game on the platform in the country. Total sales in the United States numbered 357,000. The game sold over 3 million copies. By 1997, the PC version had sold nearly 37,000 retail copies in South Korea. According to Gamasutra, Rayman Advance's sales neared 600,000 units during the first half of the 2001–2002 fiscal year alone and then reached 770,000 copies by the end of March 2002.

== Legacy ==
The commercial success of Rayman established a successful franchise with several sequels, including Rayman 2: The Great Escape (1999), and some of the game's elements influenced Rayman Origins. Rayman was Ubisoft's first game to achieve considerable success, and it empowered the company to go public in 1996. Ancel was honoured by the French government for his work in 2006. The character Rayman became a recognisable character after the game's release, especially his popularity surviving the transition to next-generation consoles, and was once considered to become the mascot character for the Atari Jaguar.

Rayman was brought to the Game Boy Color in early 2000, to Palm OS in September 2001, to the Nintendo DSi in December 2009, and to iOS in February 2016. The Game Boy Color version was one of a number of Ubisoft games for the platform that utilised the "Ubi Key" feature, allowing players to share data between games via the system's infrared port and unlock extra content. Rayman Advance, a variant for the Game Boy Advance developed by Digital Eclipse, was released in June 2001. Next Generation noted that the game remained largely the same as the original and lauded its graphics, music, and controls. Eurogamer writer Martin Taylor considered it "a stunning looker, and possibly one of the best looking GBA games available at the moment". The game is one of twenty titles included with the PlayStation Classic, a miniature PlayStation replica released in December 2018.

Rémi Gazel, the composer for Rayman, sought to turn the soundtrack into a live performance titled Rayman by Rémi prior to his death from cancer in May 2019.

=== Fan remake ===
Rayman Redemption, a fan remake by the Finnish developer Ryemanni, features additional worlds, levels, and minigames. It was released for free via Game Jolt for Rayman's 25th anniversary. It received praise from reviewers, with PC Gamer and Kotaku highlighting that the game has an option for casual and masocore players, something they considered a fortune for players traumatised by the original game's difficulty. Kotaku also commended the added content. The Retronauts writer Stuart Gipp considered the game impressive when compared to Alex Kidd in Miracle World DX and Sonic Mania. He highlighted the project's extensive attempts at revising the original game's flaws before criticising the reduction of some characteristics that had given the original game its identity.

=== 30th Anniversary Edition ===
On 12 February 2026, Ubisoft announced Rayman: 30th Anniversary Edition, a compilation developed by Digital Eclipse that is composed of the PlayStation, Atari Jaguar, MS-DOS, Game Boy Color, and Game Boy Advance versions of the original game, alongside the 124 extra levels from Rayman Designer, Rayman 60 Levels, and Rayman By His Fans. New features include rewind, infinite lives and invincibility toggles, a reimagined soundtrack by Rayman Origins and Rayman Legends composer Christophe Héral, newly-recorded interviews with the original staff, and a playable prototype of the cancelled Super NES version. The original soundtrack by Rémi Gazel is not available in the compilation, with Nintendo Life attributing its absence to Ubisoft potentially losing the rights to the original audio. The collection was released for Nintendo Switch, PlayStation 5, Windows, and Xbox Series X/S on 13 February 2026, with physical editions planned on 26 June of that year.

==== Reception ====
Reception

Aggregate scores
| Aggregator | Score |
|---|---|
| Metacritic | 72/100 |
| OpenCritic | 59% recommend (Note: Based on 39 reviews) |

Review scores
| Publication | Score |
|---|---|
| Nintendo Life | 7/10 |
| Retro Gamer | 84% |

Rayman: 30th Anniversary Edition received "mixed or average" reviews, according to the review aggregator website Metacritic. Push Square rated the game 6/10, praising the gameplay "[holding] up well after all these years" and the inclusion of additional levels, but criticizing the soundtrack "[cutting] out entirely, leaving large silences" and stating that the different ports "feel almost identical", opining that the anniversary package should have included other Rayman games. Similar remarks were issued by Nintendo Life, who gave the game a score of 7/10, outlining the game's value to a "super fan of the original game", noting the absence of the original soundtrack and stating that it "would have been nice to at least have had Rayman 2 included".

Upon launch, the 30th Anniversary Edition received mixed reviews on Steam, with more than half of the reviews being negative. Users complained about the new soundtrack not being faithful to the game, with no option to switch to the original soundtrack, as well as the forced DRM via Ubisoft Connect. A Ubisoft employee later stated on the official Ubisoft Discord server that the team will "look into" the ability to swap to the original soundtrack. After a saved game bug was discovered, one Ubisoft Support representative falsely reported the end of the game's support after less than two days of its release; this was later debunked by another employee.
