= Rayman (character) =

Video game character

- Rayman character
- Rayman as he appears in Rayman Legends (2013)
- First game: Rayman (1995)
- Created by: Michel Ancel
- Designed by: Michel Ancel
- Voiced by: Language-neutral: Steven Perkinson (Rayman); Pierre-Alain de Garrigues (Rayman 2: The Great Escape); Gabrielle Shrager (2011); Douglas Rand (2013); French: Fabrice Melquiot (Rayman Dictées); Emmanuel Garijo (1999-2003); Sébastien Mineo (Mario + Rabbids Sparks of Hope); Guillaume Darnault (Captain Laserhawk: A Blood Dragon Remix); English: Billy West (Rayman: The Animated Series); David Gasman (2000-2003, 2023-present); David Menkin (Captain Laserhawk: A Blood Dragon Remix)

Rayman (French pronunciation: [ʁɛman]) is the titular protagonist of Ubisoft's video game series of the same name. He was created by Monégasque game designer Michel Ancel, who thought that games needed a character who can perfectly connect with players. Due to technical issues during the development of Rayman (1995), Rayman's body is distinctively limbless, with his head, hands and feet invisibly linked to his torso.

Rayman's signature abilities are throwing his fists as projectiles to attack enemies and spinning his hair like a helicopter rotor to slow his descent. He uses his abilities to rescue the inhabitants of the Glade of Dreams from evil forces. Rayman is accompanied on his adventures by his best friend Globox, the Teensies, Barbara and other supporting characters. In most of his appearances, Rayman is depicted as fun-loving and humorous.

Since his debut title, Rayman has become one of Ubisoft's most recognizable characters. Critics have praised Rayman for his limbless and wacky nature and the character has since gained a cult following. After being overshadowed in popularity by the Rabbids, Rayman returned to the series as a playable character in an expansion pack for Mario + Rabbids Sparks of Hope (2022). Rayman also appeared as a supporting character in Captain Laserhawk: A Blood Dragon Remix (2023). He is currently set to appear as the main protagonist in the 2026 game Rayman Legends Retold, a remake of Rayman Legends.

== Conception and characteristics ==
Rayman was created and designed by French designer Michel Ancel. He conceived Rayman as a teenager in the 1980s and noted that his simplicity and directness made him perfect, feeling that his design is as much about the psychology of a gamer than it is about lines on paper. Ancel believes that games need a face and a personality because those are the best means by which to connect with players. As a result of his research, Ancel became interested in rendering tools and he initially named his character Rayman, after a ray tracing software that Ubisoft used for the original game.

Rayman originally had limbs, but when the developer tried to install the game on the systems, it did not work properly, leaving him with a floating body on the screen. At the time, there was insufficient processing power to render everything which made it technically impossible to display this character with animated limbs. The creative answer was to create the character without limbs, which became one of his major characteristics. As a result of the worldwide success of the character after the first game was released, Ubisoft gained their first growth.

Rayman is an anthropomorphic being who is limbless in which he can use his hair as helicopter blades means of transportation which was trademarked as "hairlicopter" and punch at a distance. His personality was an adventurer with a sense of humor inspired by Indiana Jones. Rayman is defined by his ability rather than his appearance or any traits of individuality or autonomy.

== Appearances ==
=== Main appearances ===
Rayman makes his first appearance in the first game (1995) of the series, in which the evil Mr. Dark steals the Great Protoon and makes the Electoons lose their natural stability and scatter throughout the Glade of Dreams, where they are then captured by Mr. Dark's forces. Rayman must retrieve the Great Protoon from Mr. Dark and free the Electoons. In the sequel Rayman 2: The Great Escape (1999) Rayman and his friend Globox are kidnapped by Robo-Pirates, led by the ruthless Admiral Razorbeard, who starts invading their colorful world. Rayman begins his adventure captured aboard the prison ship and escapes when Globox gives him a Silver Lum, restoring his powers. After escaping, Rayman must travel across different lands, collecting Lums and powerful masks to awaken the spirit of the Glade, Polokus, to eradicate the Robo-Pirate threat.

In Rayman 3: Hoodlum Havoc (2003), Rayman and Globox face an invasion of evil and mischievous creatures known as Hoodlums, caused by a red Lum turned Dark Lum, André, who turned all the other red Lums around into other Dark Lums. However, Globox accidentally swallows André, and Rayman must take him to various Doctors in the Glade of Dreams to get André out of Globox and stop the invasion before the Hoodlums get their hands on Globox first. In Rayman Raving Rabbids (2006), Rayman and a few baby Globoxes relax until the Rabbids capture the baby Globoxes. They force Rayman to participate in several activities to entertain them. However, in the handheld version, The Rabbids imprison Rayman and take his fists. Murfy later rescues him with his fists, and Rayman sets out to stop the Rabbids. In Rayman Raving Rabbids 2 (2007), Rayman pretends to be a Rabbid to foil their mission to take over the Earth.

In Rayman Origins (2011), Rayman is sleeping alongside Globox, Teensies and their creator, the Bubble Dreamer. However, their snoring disturbs an old grandmother figure from the Land of the Livid Dead who retaliates by sending an evil army of disgusting creatures known as Darktoons across the world to get revenge. Rayman must defeat the Darktoons and rescue his creator, Betilla the Nymph, as well as her sisters. In Rayman Legends (2013), Rayman and his friends have been asleep for one century. Rayman and his friends are awakened by Murfy who tells them about a bunch of new characters that have invaded during their slumber. Rayman and his friends set out to defeat a series of enemies and Mr. Dark emulators known as Dark Teensies.

=== Other appearances ===
In Super Smash Bros. for Nintendo 3DS and Wii U, Rayman appears as a trophy. Masahiro Sakurai made the announcement on Miiverse: Ubisoft was expected a 2D model of the character, however the company was both surprised and pleased when a 3D model was delivered. In Super Smash Bros. Ultimate, Rayman appears as a spirit. Many people have noted that a crystal on the Battlefield stage in the game appears to contain Rayman, though this has been yet to be confirmed. Rayman also appeared as a playable character in Brawlhalla.

In Mario + Rabbids Sparks of Hope, Rayman was featured as playable character in a downloadable content (Rayman in the Phantom Show) expansion announced during Ubisoft Forward 2022. Davide Soliani, the game's director, claimed that he was elated to reunite Rayman with the Rabbids, who had vastly overshadowed Rayman's own popularity. Rayman was added to the game on August 30, 2023. Rayman also made an appearance in the 2023 adult animated series Captain Laserhawk: A Blood Dragon Remix, in which he was portrayed as a cocaine-addicted propaganda host. Rayman appears in the 2024 platform game Astro Bot as a VIP Bot dressed as him appears in the Winter Wonder DLC level, released on December 13, 2024. The Bot is called "Limbless Legend" and his design is based on his appearances in the original Rayman game and Rayman 2.

Rayman also appeared in the animated series Rayman: The Animated Series.

== Promotion and reception ==
Rayman has become a well received, and recognizable video game character by fans and critics and was known for his lack of limbs. In an interview with Stevior's Steve Wright, Ubisoft CEO Yves Guillemot stated Rayman was one of the company's most well-known and beloved characters. Bertoli Ben described Rayman as one of the most beloved video game characters originally created in France, stating that he is different and had a unique movement. GamesRadar+'s Rachel Weber described Rayman as the 20th most recognizable video game character of all time. She added that Rayman was much like Mumford and Sons or Worcester sauce-flavored crisps, few people publicly stated to Rayman being their favorite and described him as "Ubisoft's cheerful magical hero". Nintendo Life's Alana Hagues felt that the character was bit of an "underdog, even Ubisoft has struggled what to do with the character, but the character has gained a cult following". She noted that Rayman sticks out more for his "weirdness" more than anything else and "he has always been a bit more lowkey than the other 1990's video game mascots".

Rayman became a recognizable character after his debut appearance that he was once considered to become the mascot character for the Atari Jaguar. In an article about the character's 20th anniversary by Vice writer David Whelan, he commented that the character set standards for being weird and described him as "a floating collection of limbs and bandana or scarf, or the flesh of his enemies." He also criticized Ubisoft for having made very little to commemorate what is essentially their "mascot". While discussing about his childhood, he noted that Rayman seemed like a "total dork", pointing out that he was not "cool" like Sonic or "fun-for-everyone" like Mario, but rather seemed "nerdish" and "weird-looking." Another Vice writer Grant Pardee wrote that Rayman is like the "quiet kid of the platformer mascot class" who could perhaps secretly have been the best of them all yet, due to timing or circumstance, never quite got the attention he seemingly deserved because "Rayman looks stupid, has a dumb, stupid face", and does not have limbs.

Rayman has been one of the most requested characters for Super Smash Bros. over the years as said when Twitter user CallMeKorora sent off a letter to Nintendo of America - requesting the character in the series. In February 2015, YouTuber Omni Jacala uploaded a fake leaked video of the character and Mewtwo being selected in Super Smash Bros. for Nintendo 3DS and Wii U which led to rumors and Super Smash Bros. fans convincing that the character was set to join the cast of the game.

In the wake of the 2023 animated series Captain Laserhawk: A Blood Dragon Remix, Michael McWhertor of Polygon interviewed the series' creator Adi Shankar who mentioned that his pitch was reviewed by the Guillemot brothers at Ubisoft and that there was "no pushback" with his it. He described Rayman as the "chief propaganda officer" for Eden and also explained that using Rayman as a marketing vehicle for his propaganda-pumping masters was like "a nod to the methods that Saturday-morning and afternoon cartoons were oftentimes 30-minute advertisements for toys." The Verge writer Charles Pulliam-Moore also interviewed the series' creator, who observed that Rayman as propaganda mouthpiece character was not a choice so much as it was a vision. He also stated that "[He] saw two images of Rayman as [he] was first writing: one of him with Tommy guns; and then the second was of him effectively being the mouthpiece — the chief propaganda officer for the fascist regime, but even with that being the case, he's been used. He's as much a victim as everyone else living in Eden."
