= Rayman Mini =

2019 video game

- Developers: Ubisoft Montpellier; Pastagames
- Publisher: Ubisoft
- Producer: Michel Ancel
- Designer: Axel Cossardeaux
- Programmer: César Leblic
- Artists: Nicolas Weis; Florence Charpentier; Omar Sabrou; Chloé Rousseau‑Maurice; Vincent le Guillou
- Series: Rayman
- Engine: UbiArt Framework
- Platforms: iOS, macOS, tvOS
- Release: September 19, 2019
- Genre: Platform
- Mode: Single-player

Rayman Mini is a platform video game developed by Ubisoft Montpellier and Pastagames and published by Ubisoft released on September 19, 2019 for iOS, macOS and tvOS through Apple Arcade as a launch title.

== Gameplay ==
Rayman Mini is centered on Rayman who has been shrunk to the size of an ant. The players have to pass through scenarios (48 levels at total), full of different obstacles and enemies, with the goal to undo the spell. The game gives the opportunity to choose between three characters, (Rayman, Barbara, or Globox), and unlock different costumes to customize them.

== Development ==
Michel Ancel said he "felt the right opportunity to immerse the player in a macro-photographic universe", giving this angle to him the idea to create a Rayman mini-universe, and he described the level design as the harder part of the game's development due to the game being fundamentally an endless runner. Ancel promised that future updates would arrive after Rayman Mini's launch, wanting to give it a founding role for the brand on the Apple Arcade service.

== Reception ==
Jerome Joffard of Jeuxvideo describes the game as beautiful and effective, praising the levels and soundtrack as high quality. The author added that the gameplay was enhanced in comparison of Rayman Adventures, where the difficulty was precisely calculated, but maintained old good features unaltered. The lack of new mechanics, new characters and the re-play bonus content were criticized.
