= Rayman 2: The Great Escape =

1999 video game

- PC cover art
- Developer: Ubi Pictures (Note: Ported to PlayStation by Ubi Soft Shanghai, to PlayStation 2 by Ubi Soft Annecy, to Nintendo DS by DC Studios, to iOS by Gameloft and to Nintendo 3DS by Ubisoft Casablanca. The Game Boy Color version was developed by Ubi Studios UK.)
- Publishers: Ubi Soft; Gameloft (iOS)
- Director: Michel Ancel
- Producers: Arnaud Carrette (DC); Pauline Jacquey (N64)
- Designers: Christophe Tribaut (DC); Jean-Christophe Guyot; Serge Hascoët
- Programmers: Yann Le Tensorer (N64, PC); Fabien Bole-Feysot (DC)
- Artists: Michel Ancel; Florent Sacre; Paul Tumelaire
- Writers: David Neiss; Michel Ancel
- Composers: Éric Chevalier; Daniel Masson (N64)
- Series: Rayman
- Platforms: Windows; Nintendo 64; Dreamcast; PlayStation; PlayStation 2; Game Boy Color (Note: The Game Boy Color version is a different game, and is a 2D side scroller with gameplay similar to the original Rayman); Nintendo DS; iOS; Nintendo 3DS
- Release: 29 October 1999: Windows; EU: 29 October 1999; NA: 4 November 1999 Nintendo 64; EU: 29 October 1999; NA: 9 November 1999; AU: 22 November 1999 Dreamcast; EU: 16 March 2000; NA: 21 March 2000; AU: 7 April 2000 PlayStation; EU: 8 September 2000; NA: 16 September 2000; AU: 2000 PlayStation 2; EU: 22 December 2000; NA: 20 January 2001 Game Boy Color; EU: 14 December 2001; NA: 1 January 2002 Nintendo DS; EU: 11 March 2005; NA: 28 March 2005; AU: March 2005 iOS; WW: 1 March 2010 Nintendo 3DS; EU: 25 March 2011; NA: 27 March 2011; AU: 31 March 2011
- Genres: Platform, action-adventure
- Mode: Single-player

Rayman 2: The Great Escape is a 1999 platform game developed by Ubi Pictures and published by Ubi Soft for Windows, the Nintendo 64, Dreamcast and PlayStation. The game serves as a sequel to the 1995 game. The game centers on the titular character Rayman, who is tasked with saving the fantastical land of the Fairy Glade from an army of robotic pirates led by Admiral Razorbeard.

An enhanced port titled Rayman Revolution (Note: In North America, the port was titled "Rayman 2: Revolution".) was developed by Ubi Soft Annecy for the PlayStation 2, and released in 2000. An alternative remake known as Rayman 2 Forever was developed by Ubi Studios for the Game Boy Color. Rayman 2 was critically acclaimed for its gameplay, graphics and accessibility.

== Gameplay ==
Screenshot of the Fairy Glade, the second level of the game

Rayman 2: The Great Escape is a 3D platformer which is played from a third-person perspective and allows the player control over the camera, though in some situations this control is limited to only certain angles. At several points in the game the player loses control during cutscenes, which typically show dialogue between characters.

By collecting lums (small bodies, or shards of magical energy), the player unlocks more information about the game world and its back story, which can be read by standing still and pressing a specific button for some time. Some back story is also obtained through (optional) instructions from Murfy, a "flying encyclopaedia" who provides explanations on all kinds of gameplay elements.

In contrast to its predecessor, which was a 2D platformer, Rayman 2 is a 3D platformer. The player navigates through a mostly linear sequence of levels, fighting robotic pirate enemies, solving puzzles and collecting lums. Collecting enough lums gains the player access to new parts of the world. Part of the lums are hidden in small cages, in which other freedom fighters or Teensies are imprisoned, and can be obtained by breaking the cages.

Rayman starts the game with minimal abilities, and he can gain more abilities as the game progresses. The main weapon available in the game is Rayman's fist, with which energy orbs can be shot. Eventually, the orbs can be charged before shooting them, making them more powerful. Rayman can also enter a strafing stance which allows him to easily aim orbs whilst avoiding enemy attacks. Rayman later gains the ability to swing over large gaps using Purple Lums. Rayman is also able to use his helicopter hair to slow his descent while jumping, with some segments later in the game allowing him to fly with his hair. There are also various items Rayman can use throughout the game, such as explosive barrels he can throw, giant plums he can ride on to carry him across dangerous surfaces, and rockets he must ride on to access new areas.

In addition to the main, story-based level sequence, there are also several levels in which the player can gain bonuses in a time trial. Additionally, by collecting all lums and breaking all cages in a level, the player unlocks a bonus level in which one of Globox's children races against a robot pirate. When the player controlling the child wins the race, Rayman gains health or a powerup.

== Plot ==
In this cutscene, Rayman gives one of the four masks to Polokus.

The Glade of Dreams is invaded by robotic pirates, led by Admiral Razorbeard, with the intent to conquer and enslave. The crisis prompts volunteers, including Rayman and his friend Globox, to form resistance groups. Rayman and Globox confront an army of robots. Rayman battles valiantly with energy spheres, while Globox, despite his fear, aids by creating rain to rust the robots. However, a telepathic message from Ly the Fairy reveals devastating news: the pirates have destroyed the Primordial Core, scattering the world's energy, and have captured most of the warriors. This loss strips Rayman of his powers, leading to his capture. As Admiral Razorbeard gloats, Rayman urges Globox to escape and find Ly, defiantly vowing to resist.

Imprisoned aboard the pirate ship Buccaneer, Rayman despairs over his lost powers until Globox delivers a Silver Lum from Ly, restoring his abilities. Rayman escapes through a pipe, but a collision with Globox sends them plummeting. Landing in the Woods of Light and separated from Globox, Rayman learns from Globox’s children that Ly has been captured. The four Teensie Kings inform him that Ly is held in the Fairy Glade's robotic pirate fortress. Rayman rescues Ly, who reveals that Polokus, the world's spirit, can restore his full powers if Rayman collects four magical masks. After Ly transfers her remaining power to him and vanishes, Rayman frees Ssssam the Swamp Snake, who reveals Globox's recapture.

Rayman's quest for the masks begins at the Sanctuary of Water and Ice, where he defeats the guardian Axel to claim the first mask. In Polokus's realm, the spirit promises to awaken and aid Rayman once all masks are gathered. In the Menhir Hills, Rayman finds the warrior Clark, weakened from swallowing a robotic pirate. To heal him, Rayman enters the Cave of Bad Dreams, surviving pursuit by the guardian Jano. Rejecting a treasure of gold, Rayman chooses the Elixir of Life, curing Clark. In the Canopy, Rayman frees Globox, who provides another Silver Lum. Carmen the whale guides Rayman through Whale Bay to the Sanctuary of Stone and Fire, where the guardian Umber helps him secure the second mask. Rayman defeats the guardian Foutch in the Sanctuary of Rock and Lava for the third mask. In the Iron Mountains, Globox's wife Uglette reveals Globox's re-imprisonment on the Buccaneer and their children's enslavement in the mines. Rayman rescues the children, one of whom found the fourth mask. With all masks united, Polokus awakens, destroying the pirates' land fortresses but leaving the Buccaneer to Rayman.

Aboard the ship, Admiral Razorbeard acquires the Grolgoth, a formidable mecha, for a final showdown. Rayman frees the prisoners and confronts Admiral Razorbeard in the crow's nest, where Globox is held hostage. The battle intensifies as the deck collapses, plunging Rayman toward a lava-filled furnace. Ly's timely Silver Lum saves him, and she urges him to defeat Admiral Razorbeard. In an airborne clash, Rayman knocks the Grolgoth into the lava. Razorbeard escapes in a small craft, triggering the Grolgoth's self-destruction, obliterating the Buccaneer. Rayman's friends, mourning his apparent death after finding only his foot, are overjoyed when he emerges, injured but alive, on a crutch.

== Development ==
Rayman 2: The Great Escape was originally conceptualised as a sidescrolling 2D platformer, like the first game. Development on the prototype began in early 1996 with a team of six people and a budget of 10 million francs. It was slated to be released on the PlayStation, Sega Saturn, and Windows in the fourth quarter of that year. The prototype of Rayman 2 featured some usage of prerendered bitmaps of 3D computer models, differing from the hand-drawn presentation of its predecessor.

In July 1996, German magazine MAN!AC previewed the original 2D version of Rayman 2, describing a storyline in which robot invaders polluted Rayman's world. The game featured new mechanics allowing Rayman to move between foreground and background sections, alongside expanded combat abilities. The preview also identified the returning fairy Betilla and a scientist named Fudge as supporting characters.

With the rise of 3D games, the team changed direction and turned it into a 3D platformer inspired by Super Mario 64. This required Ubisoft hire more team members; 70-80 developers, many of whom inexperienced, ultimately worked on Rayman 2 for more than two years. To avoid damaging Rayman's reputation, Ubisoft first released Tonic Trouble, a 3D platformer whose game engine would also be used in Rayman 2. The PC was the original lead platform, but it was switched to the Nintendo 64 mid-development, necessitating reducing the quality of the textures. The Dreamcast version uses the original high-quality textures. The art design was inspired by the works of animators Hayao Miyazaki and Tex Avery, as well as Art Nouveau artists such as Alphonse Mucha, and was made to give the game's world a sense of mythology.

Development of the Dreamcast version began in March 1999, with approximately 25 people working on the conversion. Project leader Arnaud Carrette and game designer Alexandre Gatto explained that the Dreamcast team was based in Paris and separate from the PC development team in Annecy, although the two shared four graphics artists. The developers prioritised maintaining a frame rate of 60 frames per second, which influenced decisions about the number of characters appearing on screen. They also expanded the game's graphical effects and environments for the Dreamcast hardware. In February 2000, Italian magazine Consolemania reported that approximately 80% of the Dreamcast version's code had been adapted from earlier versions, with roughly half of its development team having previously worked on the Nintendo 64 release. The conversion also supported widescreen display and both 50 Hz and 60 Hz video output on PAL consoles. In August 2000, Sega Magazin reported that three bonus levels for the Dreamcast version were available to download from the game's website, rayman2dc.com.

== Release ==
Rayman 2: The Great Escape was first released for the Nintendo 64 and Windows in Europe on 29 October 1999. The Windows version followed in North America on 4 November, with the Nintendo 64 version arriving on 9 November. The Nintendo 64 edition supports the Expansion Pak, allowing the game to run at a higher resolution, and uses sequenced music rather than CD audio. By comparison, the Windows version features more detailed graphics and a 22 kHz Red Book CD soundtrack.

A Dreamcast conversion was released in Europe on 16 March 2000, followed by North America on 21 March and Japan on 23 March. Based on the Windows version, it features modified environments and a reworked final battle, alongside additional bonus minigames.

Following an earlier delay, a PlayStation conversion developed by Ubi Soft Shanghai was released in Europe on 8 September 2000 and North America on 16 September. This version features reduced graphical detail, redesigned level layouts, alterations to the world map and a playable prototype of an early 2D version of the game. An enhanced PlayStation 2 adaptation, titled Rayman Revolution and developed by Ubi Soft Annecy, followed in Europe on 22 December 2000. It features improved graphics compared with the Windows and Dreamcast versions, together with additional and modified levels.

Subsequent releases included Rayman DS, a port of the Nintendo 64 version released as a European Nintendo DS launch title on 11 March 2005, followed by North America on 28 March. An iOS version was released on 1 March 2010, followed by Rayman 3D, a Nintendo 3DS launch title in 2011. Both were based on the Dreamcast version, with the bonus minigames removed. The original Nintendo 64 edition was subsequently made available through Nintendo Classics on 17 December 2025.

== Reception ==
Reception

Aggregate scores
Aggregator	Score
GameRankings	List: SDC: 93%; N64: 89%; DS: 59%; PC: 91%; PS: 87%; PS2: 85%
Metacritic	List: 3DS: 61/100; iOS: 53/100; N64: 90/100; DS: 58/100; PS2: 90/100

Review scores
Publication	Score
Computer Games Magazine	4.5/5
Computer and Video Games	4/5
Electronic Gaming Monthly	(SDC) 9/10 (N64) 9/10 (PS2) 9/10
Eurogamer	9/10
Game Informer	(SDC) 9/10; 3DS: 7.5/10 (N64) 7.75/10
GameFan	(PS) 96% (N64) 9/10
GamePro	(N64) 5/5 (PS2) 5/5
GameRevolution	(3DS) 3/7 (PS) 4.5/5
GameSpot	List: (SDC) 9.4/10; (3DS) 7/10; (DS) 6/10; (PC) 9.3/10; (PS) 8.2/10; (PS2) 9.1/10
GamesRadar+	7/10
IGN	List: (SDC) 9.6/10; (iOS) 5.5/10; (3DS) 5.5/10; (DS) 6/10; (PC) 9.2/10; (PS) 9.2/10; (PS2) 8.8/10
Jeuxvideo.com	9.5/10
N64 Magazine	73%
Next Generation	4/5
Nintendo Life	4/10
Nintendo World Report	(DS) 6/10 (3DS) 5/10
Official U.S. PlayStation Magazine	5/5
Pocket Gamer	(iOS) 3/5 (3DS) 3/5
TouchArcade	3/5
VideoGamer.com	7/10

Award
Publication	Award
Game Developers Choice Awards	Excellence in Level Design (2001)

Rayman 2: The Great Escape received critical acclaim upon release, with the Windows version receiving a silver sales award from Entertainment and Leisure Software Publishers Association (ELSPA).

Jeff Lundrigan for Next Generation reviewed the Nintendo 64 version of the game for and stated that "with its cute character designs and slick, polished gameplay, Rayman 2 is one of the few titles that can honestly claim to have something to offer any gamer of any age or skill." IGN writer Brandon Justice praised it as "the most impressive feat of game design and execution the platforming genre has ever seen" and recommended players to forget about Crash Bandicoot, Super Mario 64 (both 1996), and Banjo-Kazooie (1998).

Many writers of Game Informer praised the game as a "gorgeous" game in which pays homage to Banjo-Kazooie and calling it the best Nintendo 64 game because of its camera and control system in which one of the writers Jay wrote how there times when the game looked brilliantly such as "helicoptering down a long chute or skiing behind a sea monster." Stuart Clarke of The Sydney Morning Herald appreciated that the graphics are "lush and beautiful" which was helped by the Nintendo 64 Expansion Pak or a "good" PC 3D accelerator card. He also reviewed the Dreamcast version and stated that "just go out and buy it. You won't be disappointed."

GameSpot regarded the Dreamcast version as the best version of the game at the time of its release.

The reception for Rayman DS was mixed or average, IGN writer Craig Harris citing graphical flaws and camera problems. While it did support controlling the game via the touchpad, this was regarded as both "sloppy and awkward," GameSpot writer Provo Frank criticize that it has made numerous graphical issues that often interfere with gameplay.

Rayman 2 is occasionally included in "greatest video games" lists by video game publications, with IGN calling it "a demonstration of what the modern platform game could be -- smart, fast and challenging."

=== Accolades ===
Rayman 2 was nominated for personal computer action game of the year award by GameSpot in 1999. The Dreamcast version was a runner-up for GameSpot's annual best platform game award. During the 4th Annual Interactive Achievement Awards, the Academy of Interactive Arts & Sciences nominated Rayman 2 in the categories of "Game of the Year", "Console Game of the Year", "Console Action/Adventure", "Animation", and "Game Design". Rayman Revolution was a runner-up for GameSpot's annual best platform game award.

== Legacy ==
A sequel titled, Rayman 3: Hoodlum Havoc was released in 2003, Rayman 2 influenced the development of Evil Twin: Cyprien's Chronicles (2001). During development, In Utero lead programmer Diego Fernandez-Bravo named Rayman 2, Crash Bandicoot and Shadow of the Beast among the platform games that the team considered to have the best gameplay, stating that Evil Twin borrowed some camera techniques from those games. Project manager Stephan Hernandez also said that the team aimed for a level of gameplay quality comparable to Rayman 2.

Rayman 2 also influenced the development of Psychonauts (2005). In a 2021 interview, Psychonauts director Tim Schafer named Rayman 2, alongside Super Mario 64 and Skies of Arcadia, as games that inspired Psychonauts, particularly citing his interest in the feeling of an epic story and a large world to explore.
