= Rayman 3: Hoodlum Havoc =

2003 video game

- Developers: Ubi Soft Paris; Ubi Soft Shanghai (NGC / HD); Ludi Factory (GBA); Gameloft (NGE)
- Publishers: Ubi Soft; Gameloft (NGE); Feral Interactive (OS X)
- Producer: Ahmed Boukhelifa
- Designer: Michael Janod
- Writer: David Neiss
- Composers: Plume; Fred Leonard; Laurent Parisi
- Series: Rayman
- Platforms: GameCube; Game Boy Advance; Mobile phone; PlayStation 2; Xbox; Microsoft Windows; N-Gage; OS X; PlayStation 3; Xbox 360
- Release: 21 February 2003: GameCube, Game Boy Advance; EU: 21 February 2003; NA: 4 March 2003 PlayStation 2, Xbox; EU: 14 March 2003; NA: 18 March 2003 Microsoft Windows; EU: 21 March 2003; NA: 24 March 2003 Mobile (Java ME); FRA: 3 April 2003; NA: May 2003 N-Gage; NA: 9 December 2003; EU: 26 November 2004 OS X; WW: 6 February 2004 PlayStation 3; NA: 20 March 2012; PAL: 21 March 2012 Xbox 360; WW: 21 March 2012
- Genres: Platform, action-adventure
- Modes: Single-player, multiplayer (Note: Only the GameCube version has multiplayer.)

Rayman 3: Hoodlum Havoc is a 2003 platform game developed and published by UbiSoft, it is the third major installment in the Rayman series and the sequel to Rayman 2: The Great Escape (1999). It follows Rayman in his quest to stop an evil Black Lum named André from taking over the world with his army of hoodlum soldiers, which includes finding a cure for his best friend Globox after he accidentally swallows André. It was released for the GameCube, PlayStation 2, Xbox and Microsoft Windows, and on OS X by Feral Interactive in 2004. It was also released for the Game Boy Advance, N-Gage and mobile phones as a 2D platformer.

== Gameplay ==
Rayman's controls are similar to that of Rayman 2: The Great Escape, albeit utilising long-ranged punches (and kicks at some opportunities), instead of throwing Energy Spheres. Rayman can restore health by picking up Red Lums. Instead of permanent upgrades to his abilities, Rayman can find special "Laser Detergent" cans (used by the Hoodlums to turn their clothes into combat fatigues) containing one of five temporary power-ups. The Vortex allows Rayman to fire mini-tornadoes instead of punching, the Heavy Metal Fist increases Rayman's strength and allows him to break down certain doors, the Lockjaw gives Rayman extendable claw weapons that can be used to latch onto and electrocute enemies or swing across gaps, the Shock Rocket allows Rayman to fire a remote controlled missile, and the Throttle Copter provides Rayman with a special helmet that allows him to fly vertically for a limited time. After a certain point in the game, Rayman gains the ability to pull a face similar to the original game, which allows him to turn Black Lums left behind from defeating Hoodlums into Red Lums.

Unlike most entries, Rayman 3 features an arcade-style scoring system that tallies points from the player's actions. Whenever points are scored, this system switches to a "Combo mode" that adds additional points acquired from the player's actions to a separate counter, though if the player's scoring stops after a short time, the Combo mode ends as well; any points earned while the Combo mode was active are added to the score when it ends (i.e. if the player scores 50 points while the Combo mode is active, another 50 will be added to the Combo mode counter and then added to the total score once the mode ends). If Rayman takes damage, one point is deducted from the score. Points earned over the course of the game can unlock hidden content and, in some levels, allow access to hidden areas in later sections, therefore it is imperative to get as high a score as possible. If points are scored while using a power-up acquired from a Laser Detergent, all point values are doubled, but this also applied to the penalty upon taking damage. Until the release of Rayman Raving Rabbids, players could enter their final overall game scores in a worldwide score ranking on the RaymanZone website.

== Plot ==
Set shortly after the events of the second game, André, supposed to have grown out of pure evil, appears and transforms Red Lums into Black Lums to join him. The group eventually gains enough hair from various animals throughout the forest to dress themselves as scarecrow-like Hoodlums. In the middle of the process, Murfy, one of the residents and workers of the Fairy Council, discovers them. André later finds him hiding nearby, and he and his Black Lums pursue him. Murfy is chased to a small clearing, where Rayman and his friend Globox are sound asleep. Just after Murfy reaches them, Globox is awakened by the commotion. Now aware of the situation, Globox helps Murfy to get Rayman, who is still asleep, to safety. In the process, Globox accidentally removes Rayman's hands, forcing Murfy to pick Rayman up by his hair and fly him away from the clearing himself. In an attempt to save himself, Globox runs to safety, taking Rayman's hands along with him.

As time passes, more Hoodlums invade the forest. After Rayman wakes up, he and Murfy reach the entrance to the Council and discover Globox hiding in a barrel. Just as Rayman gets his hands back from Globox, André and a few of his minions appear, following Globox as he flees into the Council. As Rayman and Murfy pursue them, they learn of André's evil plan: to taint the world's heart so he can create an army of Hoodlums. Eventually, André catches up with Globox, who accidentally swallows the evil creature. Afterward, Rayman attempts to seek out a doctor who can rid André of Globox's insides, and Murfy departs from the team, warning Rayman the Black Lum may force Globox to drink plum juice despite the latter's allergy to it. Rayman meets up with three doctors: Otto Psi (a play on the word autopsy), Romeo Patti (homeopathy), and Art Rytus (arthritis). After all three doctors make independent attempts at purging André by using various parts of Globox's body as musical instruments, they get rid of him after collaborating in Art Rytus' clinic room. Refusing to admit defeat, André teams up with Reflux, a member of the Knaaren race that Rayman had defeated to get to Art Rytus.

Reflux steals the scepter of the Leptys – a god worshiped by his people – from the child king of the Knaaren and uses it to increase his power, which in turn will allow Andre to reproduce infinitely. With Globox's help, Rayman climbs to the top of the Tower of the Leptys and faces Reflux and André as the former transforms into a giant winged monster. After a prolonged battle, Rayman and Globox destroy Reflux, and Rayman turns André back into a Red Lum by scaring him by pulling a face (a power he had acquired prior from being imbued with the Leptys' power), which results in all the Black Lums turning back into Red Lums. Shortly thereafter, Rayman and Globox return to the clearing that they were in before. Before they resume their nap, Globox admits that he misses André and would like him back, but Rayman says it is not a good idea and does not know how to get him back. Globox says that a Red Lum has to be scared to be a Black Lum, to which Rayman replies that he would hate to imagine what could scare a Lum. A flashback to before the beginning of the game reveals that Rayman unwittingly created André when his hands went off on their own and scared a Red Lum with frightening shadow puppets.

== Development ==
Rayman 3: Hoodlum Havoc was announced by Ubi Soft on March 6, 2002, for the PlayStation 2, Xbox, GameCube and Microsoft Windows. The company promoted the game as introducing a greater emphasis on combat, new environments and more elaborate character designs. The game had a marketing budget of $4 million.

Unlike the previous two mainline Rayman games, series creator Michel Ancel was not directly responsible for leading development. Ancel explained that he wished to explore new characters and gameplay concepts, and instead provided occasional creative assistance, including advice on Rayman's redesigned appearance. Several developers from earlier games assumed leading roles, including art director Céline Tellier and lead game designer Michael Janod. Ahmed Boukhelifa served as project manager, overseeing the main development team.

According to Boukhelifa, the development team sought to preserve the identity of the series while introducing faster-paced action and more exaggerated humour. Combat was redesigned around encounters with multiple enemies, including opponents attacking from different elevations. The developers also created distinctive environments intended to move beyond conventional platform-game settings. Character designer Stéphane Zinetti contributed designs for the game's new creatures and enemies. A September 2002 preview by GameSpot observed that the game placed greater emphasis on combat and puzzle-driven action than its predecessor.

Rayman's character model was rebuilt from scratch to take advantage of the increased graphical capabilities of contemporary consoles. Additional polygons were used for his face and hands, allowing a wider range of facial expressions and animations. Ancel approved of the more cartoon-like appearance, believing it recalled the humour and personality of the original Rayman.

Development was divided among several international teams. The PC, PlayStation 2 and Xbox versions were developed in Montreuil, France, by a team of more than 50 people. The GameCube version was assigned to a 19-person team in Shanghai led by He Jun Xian, while a 10-person team in Montreal led by Bertrand Hélias worked on the Game Boy Advance version. Ubisoft also announced connectivity between the GameCube and Game Boy Advance versions, allowing players to unlock additional maps.

In December 2002, Ubisoft announced that John Leguizamo and Billy West would provide the English-language voices of Globox and Murfy, respectively. Originally announced for release in late 2002, the game was subsequently scheduled for spring 2003.

== Reception ==
Reception

Aggregate scores
Aggregator	Score
GameRankings	(GBA) 82% (N-G) 81% (PS2) 80% (PC) 78% (NGC) 78% (XBOX) 77%
Metacritic	(GBA) 83/100 (NGC) 77/100 (PS2) 76/100 (XBOX) 75/100 (PC) 74/100 (PS3) 72/100 (X360) 69/100

By the end of March 2003, Rayman 3: Hoodlum Havoc had sold more than 1 million copies.

Rayman 3: Hoodlum Havoc received generally positive reviews from critics. Review aggregator websites GameRankings and Metacritic gave the Game Boy Advance version 82% and 83/100, the PlayStation 2 version 80% and 76/100, the PC version 78% and 74/100, the GameCube version 78% and 77/100, the Xbox version 77% and 75/100, the Xbox 360 version 69/100, and the PlayStation 3 version 72/100.
