= Raving Rabbids: Travel in Time =

2010 video game

- North American Wii box art
- Developers: Ubisoft Paris; Ubisoft Casablanca (3DS)
- Publisher: Ubisoft
- Director: Cédric Royer
- Producer: Nino Sapina
- Writers: Cédric Royer; David Neiss
- Composer: Jennifer Kes Remington
- Series: Raving Rabbids
- Platforms: Wii, Nintendo 3DS
- Release: Wii: NA: November 21, 2010; AU: November 25, 2010; EU: November 26, 2010; JP: January 27, 2011; Nintendo 3DS: JP: March 24, 2011; PAL: March 31, 2011; NA: April 10, 2011
- Genres: Party (Wii), platformer (3DS)
- Modes: Single-player, multiplayer

Raving Rabbids: Travel in Time (French: The Lapins Crétins: Retour vers le Passé) is a party video game developed and published by Ubisoft for the Wii. It was released in North America on November 21, 2010, in Europe on November 26, 2010, in Australia on November 25, 2010, and in Japan on January 27, 2011. It is the fifth installment in the Rabbids series and, unlike the previous entry, Rabbids Go Home, it returns to the minigame genre.

== Plot summary ==
=== Wii version ===
The Rabbids use a time machine (which looks like a washing machine) to go through different times to disturb the space-time continuum. According to the trailer, first they go to Paleolithic in 10 000 BC and help a caveman discover fire, but end up giving him a lighter. Then they go to Ancient Egypt in 2500 BC to disturb work on the Sphinx and make the nose fall off. And last, they go to Middle Ages in 520 but they end up underground holding down the legendary sword Excalibur when Arthur tries to pull it off the stone, but he gives up and leaves. When the Rabbids leave, Grannie ended up pulling the sword instead of Arthur.

In the intro for the game, a Rabbid is seen inside the washing machine/time machine altering paleolithic, ancient Egypt, Middle Ages, Vienna in 1803 Beethoven's composition of the Fifth Symphony and Street Punk in 1980s, before smashing a vase in the modern day. The player then teams up with the Rabbid to mess with history (by accessing paintings related to each minigame) in order to repair the time machine (which was damaged on the trips to the aforementioned time periods). Upon altering time and accessing the golden washing machine, the Rabbid and the player are warped forward to the year 4096 A.D where Professor Barranco (the ultra-intelligent leader from Rayman Raving Rabbids 2) is drilling 30 cadet-Rabbids to use time machines to take absolute control over the space-time continuum. However, the player's Rabbid literally pulls the plug on one of the machines and causes all the time machines to disappear. This action inadvertently initiates a time paradox (which results in a sped-up version of the game intro) before ending up back in the museum. The cadets look at Barranco in confusion, not knowing exactly what happened.

== Gameplay ==
Gameplay revolves around several minigames for up to four players (with computer AI controlling unused players) set during various segments of time. Some levels feature co-operative play, such as a level where two players are tethered by toilet paper. Ubisoft has stated this game intends to be 'waggle-free', and rather than having players shake the controller as hard as they can, the designers hoped to create mini-games with more depth.

Bouncerium

*Titanic in 1912

*Wrangle Island in 400,000 BC

*Hollywood in 1923

*Ford Motor Company in 1908

*Cretaceous Period in 100,000,000 BC

Shootarium

*Carolina Gold Rush in 1799

*Apollo 11 in 1969

*Egypt in 2500 BC

"Rome in 44 BC

Flyarium

*Kite Experiment in 1750

*Project Test Apollo-Sojuz in 1975

*Mount Rushmore in 1939

*Discovery of the America in 1492

*First Flight in 1903

*Italian Renaissance in 1506

Runarium

*Camelot in 520

*Well Street Crash (Great Depression) in 1929

*Wild West of America in 1861

*Cave Painting in 32,000 BC

*Cambridge in 1665

Hookarium

*Era Jurasic in 400,000,000 BC

*Paris in 1885

*Invention of Wheel in 3000 BC

== Nintendo 3DS version ==
A Nintendo 3DS version of this game was released as a platform game in 2011, titled Rabbids Travel in Time 3D in North America, Rabbids 3D in Europe and Australia, and Rabbids Time Travel in Japan. The game was later re-released in a compilation pack called Rayman & Rabbids Family Pack, alongside Rayman Origins and Rabbids Rumble. The pack was released exclusively in Europe on October 2, 2014.

=== Plot ===
Taking place after the events of the Wii version of Raving Rabbids Travel In Time, the Rabbids are playing in the museum, when the same Time Machine appears, this time containing a Rabbid with a duck ring. After the Rabbids fight for the duck ring, the player and the Rabbid get warped to the past, in which the player once again teams up with the Rabbid to get back to the Present while making mess of history again. The game's ending shows the Rabbid the player teamed up with finding a refrigerator, in which the Rabbid attempts to use it as a Time Machine, but he only put some stuff on himself, and is zapped by a lighting spark, and the credits roll.

== Reception ==
Reception

Aggregate score
Aggregator	Score
Metacritic	(WII) 62/100 (3DS) 55/100

Review scores
Publication	Score
Game Informer	(3DS) 5.5/10
GameSpot	(WII) 6.5/10 (3DS) 6/10
GamesRadar+	(WII) 3.5/5
IGN	(WII) 7/10 (3DS) 4.5/10
Nintendo Life	(WII) 7/10 (3DS) 6/10
Nintendo World Report	(3DS) 3.5/10
The Guardian	(WII) 3/5
VideoGamer.com	(WII) 8/10

Raving Rabbids: Travel in Time was met with mixed reviews. Nintendo Power gave the game a 6.5, while VideoGamer gave it a score of 8/10. Official Nintendo Magazine criticized the game, giving it a 40/100. IGN reviewed the game, praising the graphics and the museum hub included, and gave the game a 7/10. Other websites, such as Nintendo Life and GameStyle, gave it the same score as well. TheBitBlock.com was more positive, giving the game 8/10, praising the inclusion of online play, graphics, and multiplayer, but criticized the disappointing use of WiiMotionPlus, the shooting games, and the historical theme of the game. TheBitBlock.com called it "a party game that offers up content that you've never seen before in the party genre." The game was not well received by fans of the series and was criticized for the return to the party roots.
