= Jennifer Kes Remington =

American composer and filmmaker

Jennifer Kes Remington is an American composer and filmmaker. She has done music for titles such as The Powerpuff Girls, Scary Movie 4, Foster's Home for Imaginary Friends, Socket, and Clerks II. Her work on Foster's Home for Imaginary Friends garnered her two Annie Award wins in 2005 and 2006 as well as a third Annie nomination in 2007. All three were in the category "Best Music in an Animated Television Production" and shared with series composer James L. Venable. Her documentary film Hollywood, 90038 won the award for Best Documentary at the 2007 LA Femme Film Festival. She has also composed music for the video games Raving Rabbids: Travel in Time, Raving Rabbids: Alive & Kicking, and Rabbids Land.

== Personal life ==
Remington attended Pittsford Mendon High School and later Eastman School of Music in Rochester, New York. She obtained her Bachelor of Fine Arts degree in music technology at the University of Michigan School of Music, Theatre & Dance in Ann Arbor, Michigan, in 2000.

== Filmography ==
Year	Work	Credit	Notes
1999	Dancing with Agnes	Weapons specialist	Short
2002	Project Redlight	Composer	Short
2003	Scary Movie 3	Music pre-mix	Film
2003–2004	The Powerpuff Girls	Additional music score, Music score by	TV series
2004	EuroTrip	Music pre-mix	Film
2004	Jersey Girl	Music pre-mix	Film
2005	Deuce Bigalow: European Gigolo	Music pre-mix	Film
2005	Venom	Music pre-mix	Film
2005–2009	Foster's Home for Imaginary Friends	Music editor, composer	39 episodes
2006	Scary Movie 4	Composer: additional music	Film
2006	Clerks II	Music pre-mix; Performer: "An Evening in Paradise"	Film
2006	The Reef	Composer: additional music	Film
2006	Happily N'Ever After	Composer: additional music	Film
2006	The Legend of the Grand Director	Composer	Short
2007	Kickin' It Old Skool	Composer: additional music	Film
2007	The Last Day of Summer	Composer: additional music	Film
2007	Socket	Writer	"Last Night", "Everything Real", "Electric Current", "New Girl", "Saturday Afternoon"
2007	Hollywood, 90038	Director, editor, producer	Documentary
2008	Turok: Son of Stone	Music editor	Video
2008	Foster's Home for Imaginary Friends: Destination Imagination	Music editor, composer	TV movie
2008	The Powerpuff Girls Rule!!!	Composer: additional music	TV short
2008	Benny: Escaped Convict	Composer	Short
2008	Tour de Fright	Composer	Video short
2008	Yay! Planes	Composer	Video short
2009	The Powerpuff Girls: Who, What, Where, How, Why... Who Cares?	Composer: additional music	Video documentary short
2009	Frequently Asked Questions About Time Travel	Composer: additional music, music editor	Film
2009	I Hope They Serve Beer in Hell	Music editor	Film
2009	L.A. Bag Brothers	Composer	Short
2010	Pretty the Series	Musician	1 episode
2010	Justice League: Crisis on Two Earths	Music editor	Video
2010	Broken Springs	News reporter	Film
2010	Rubdown	Composer	Short
2012	Californication	Performer: "Can't Get Worse" (uncredited)	TV series
2014	If We Took a Holiday	Composer: theme music; actress (Dancer)	Short
2017	Armstrong	Composer	Film
2022	Oren's Way	Composer	Short

== Accolades ==
Year	Award	Category	Work	Shared with	Result
2006	Annie Awards	Best Music in an Animated Television Production	Foster's Home for Imaginary Friends	James L. Venable for "Duchess of Wails"	Won
2007	Annie Awards	Best Music in an Animated Television Production	Foster's Home for Imaginary Friends	James L. Venable for "One False Movie"	Won
2007	LA Femme Filmmaker Award	Best Documentary	Hollywood, 90038	—	Won
2008	Annie Awards	Best Music in an Animated Television Production	Foster's Home for Imaginary Friends	James L. Venable for "The Bloo Superdude and the Magic Potato Power"	Nominated
