= Raving Rabbids: Alive & Kicking =

2011 video game

- European box art
- Developers: Ubisoft Paris; Ubisoft Milan (Note: Additional work by Ubisoft Bucharest.)
- Publisher: Ubisoft
- Directors: Xavier Poix; Cédriv Royer; Diego Fernandez-Bravo; Davide Soliani
- Producer: Gian Marco Zanna
- Designers: Dominieuq Leblanc; Jean-Phillippe Mottier; Damiano Moro
- Programmers: Patrick Marty; Tizano Sardone
- Artists: Stéphane Bachelet; Sebastien Theilot; Fabrizio Stibiel
- Writer: Jérôme Collette
- Composer: Jennifer Kes Remington
- Series: Raving Rabbids
- Engine: LyN
- Platform: Xbox 360
- Release: AU: November 3, 2011; EU: November 4, 2011; NA: November 8, 2011
- Genre: Party
- Modes: Single player, multiplayer

Raving Rabbids: Alive & Kicking, also known as simply Rabbids: Alive & Kicking, as The Lapins Crétins: Partent en Live in France and as Rabbids: Fuori di schermo in Italy, is an Xbox 360 Kinect party video game developed by Ubisoft Paris and Ubisoft Milan and published on November 3, 2011 in Australia, November 4, 2011 in Europe and November 8, 2011 in North America for the Xbox 360. This is the sixth game from the Rabbids franchise and it is the first Rabbids game not released on the Wii. The game was exclusively developed for the Kinect and consists of mini-games with up to 4 players.

== Premise ==
The game follows the Rabbids planning to rule the surface by trying to increase their population. Professor Barranco wants his assistant to use a Cow for their experiment on breeding more Rabbids. Once it worked, the invasion begins and the player must complete many minigames to contain the rabbids before it's too late.

== Reception ==
Reception

Aggregate score
Aggregator	Score
Metacritic	58/100

Review scores
Publication	Score
4Players	75%
Game Informer	5/10
Gamekult	4/10
GamesMaster	75%
GameSpot	4/10
GamesTM	6/10
IGN	3/10
Jeuxvideo.com	8/20
Official Xbox Magazine (US)	5.5/10
PALGN	6.5/10
Common Sense Media	3/5
Digital Spy	3/5

Rabbids: Alive & Kicking received "mixed" reviews according to the review aggregation website Metacritic. Mitch Dyer of IGN criticized the game for the gameplay but not for the controllers: "Imprecise controls ruin the uncomplicated games. It started out unfulfilling and didn't get much better. It's the kind of mindless thing I'd load up on my phone for five minute bursts." However, GameSpot criticized the "weak visuals" and "tedious navigation."

Common Sense Media gave the game three stars out of five, saying, "Rabbids: Alive & Kicking isn't as good as it could have been. The games are often fun and inventive -- we particularly liked one that involved moving to different areas of our play space and calling out for a blind rabbid to walk towards us, luring him into stepping on tacks, slipping on an oil slack, and walking into a live wire -- but there are a few that are just plain confusing and left us scratching our heads." Digital Spy gave it a similar score of three stars out of five, saying that it "Features more highlights than low points, which makes it a worthy mini-game compilation for those looking to party with Kinect." However, Metro gave it a score of two out of ten, saying, "Thank goodness Rayman is back because his would-be usurpers have never seemed more inanely un-entertaining than in this vapid mini-game collection."
