= Rabbids Rumble =

2012 video game

- Developer: Headstrong Games
- Publisher: Ubisoft
- Series: Raving Rabbids
- Platform: Nintendo 3DS
- Release: NA: November 13, 2012; AU: November 15, 2012; EU: November 16, 2012
- Genre: Turn-based strategy
- Modes: Single-player, multiplayer

Rabbids Rumble (French: The Lapins Crétins: La Grosse Bagarre) is a 2012 turn-based strategy video game developed by Headstrong Games and published by Ubisoft for the Nintendo 3DS. Initially announced by Ubisoft a few weeks before E3 2012, it is the first handheld-exclusive Rabbids game.

== Gameplay ==
Rabbids Rumble centers around battling within 7 differently-themed worlds, in which the player's party and the current foe's party take turns attacking each other until only one side has health remaining. When a rabbid loses in battle, a new party member takes their place until there are no more fighters left on one side. It features 102 playable Rabbids, who are earned by playing the different modes; StreetPass; or the packaged AR card, each with their own simple moveset. As the box art shows, these Rabbids include a professional wrestler, a football player, a superhero, a dragon, a Spartan, and an astronaut, among others. The game contains various mini-games, alongside the main fighting mode. StreetPass can be used to battle friends.

AR Cards and QR Codes are both located online for downloading. There are 5 QR Codes containing a different Rabbids character each.

== Development ==
Rabbids Rumble's development began in London some time before late May 2012. By late May, a name, box art, and screenshots of the game were released publicly even though E3 2012 was still a month away. It was decided early on in development that the game would have a slapstick humor theme. Rabbid Rumble was being developed at the same time as the Rabbids Invasion television show, meaning Nick and Ubisoft planned for the game to, among other things, keep the Rabbids brand fresh in the minds of consumers in time for the show's airing. Strong similarities between this game and the show can be found in the heavy usage of slapstick humor and the distinct 3D animation style.

== Reception ==
Reception

Aggregate score
Aggregator	Score
Metacritic	59/100

Review score
Publication	Score
Eurogamer	5/10

After its release, Rabbids Rumble received mixed reviews. Despite that, Adam Riley of Cubed3 gave the game a positive 7 out of 10 stars, and said the mini-game portions of the game were a "healthy" addition. He also said the game overall was a "very enjoyable experience", but claimed the Pokémon-like gameplay was "nowhere near as deep [as the game series it's mimicking]". Metacritic's review average is a mixed 59 out of 100.
