= Rabbids Land =

2012 video game

- European box art
- Developer: Ubisoft Paris
- Publisher: Ubisoft
- Composer: Jennifer Kes Remington
- Series: Rabbids
- Platform: Wii U
- Release: NA: November 18, 2012; PAL: November 30, 2012; JP: June 6, 2013
- Genre: Party
- Modes: Single-player, multiplayer

Rabbids Land (French: The Lapins Crétins Land) is a 2012 party video game developed and published by Ubisoft for the Wii U. It is the seventh console installment of the Rabbids series. The game was announced by Ubisoft at E3 2012, and was released as a launch title for the Wii U in North America and Europe in November 2012, with a release in Japan following in June 2013.

Rabbids Land received mixed reviews, with critics praising several mini-games but criticizing its board game play style. Online services for the game were shut down on November 11, 2017.

== Plot ==
Still on Earth, the Rabbids find themselves taking over an amusement park. Two Rabbids are attempting to go on one of the rides (not in disguise the first time, in disguise the second time as a dragon and in disguise the third time as a tall man), but are thrown out by an unseen person due to them not meeting the height requirements. One of the Rabbids contacts the Rabbid spaceship through an iPhone-like device. He tries to call the Rabbid in the spaceship, who is too busy playing with the Wii U GamePad. Unaware of the consequences, the Rabbid in the spaceship continues to play with the GamePad, which was actually controlling the whole ship. The Rabbid turns the GamePad upside down, which causes the ship to flip itself and crash land in the amusement park.

== Gameplay ==
Gameplay is similar to the Mario Party series. It features a board game-like scenario. The player rolls a die with the Wii U GamePad, and depending on the number the die lands on, the Rabbid will move to the corresponding square. These squares trigger a different feature and can be easily told apart by looking at the symbol drawn on the square. The primary goal is to win the board game by winning trophies, which can be collected by playing and winning minigames. Once a player has collected all trophies needed, they must get back to the center of the board. Upon reaching it, the game is over and the player can win prizes. Although up to four players can take turns in the main game, only two players can play the minigames at a time, with one player using the GamePad and the other using the Wii Remote (and sometimes the Nunchuk for minigames that require it). If playing single-player and you are selected to play a minigame with a CPU player that lands on a minigame square, you will always use the GamePad, while the CPU controls the Wii Remote/Nunchuk gameplay.

== Soundtrack ==
The music was composed by Jennifer Kes Remington. A 17-song soundtrack is available on the iTunes Music Store, and is based on the minigames played. Similar to the dance called "Here Comes The Hotstepper" by The Hit Crew from Just Dance 2, the game also includes licensed songs such as "Make the Party (Don't Stop)" by Bunny Beats (featuring Liquid) from Just Dance 4, "Dance All Nite" and "Baby Don't Stop Now" by Anja from Just Dance 3 and "Crazy Little Thing" from Just Dance 4, also by Anja.

Rabbids Land (Original Game Soundtrack)
No.	Title	Length
1.	"Boardgame Theme"	2:43
2.	"In the Nile, Crocodile"	2:35
3.	"Lose your Marbles"	2:01
4.	"The Pirate's Precious Jewels"	2:05
5.	"The Gift of Taking"	3:00
6.	"Octoblow"	2:50
7.	"Ghosts Suck"	1:57
8.	"Tunnel De L'amour"	2:26
9.	"Star Cheap Discovery"	1:36
10.	"Pyrobang"	2:03
11.	"Ducky Paddle"	1:57
12.	"The Beanstalk Freefall"	1:58
13.	"If You Can't Stand the Heat"	1:01
14.	"Cuperpillar"	2:23
15.	"Totemslap"	2:22
16.	"Wet the Bed"	1:39
17.	"Elephantitan"	1:01
Total length:		35:37

== Reception ==
Reception

Aggregate score
Aggregator	Score
Metacritic	52/100

Review scores
Publication	Score
Destructoid	5/10
Digital Trends	3/5
Electronic Gaming Monthly	3/10
Game Informer	4/10
GamesRadar+	2.5/5
GameTrailers	6.6/10
IGN	5/10
Nintendo Life	7/10
Nintendo Power	5/10
Nintendo World Report	7/10
Common Sense Media	3/5

Rabbids Land received "mixed" reviews, mostly because of its board game style of play, according to the review aggregation website Metacritic.

IGN called it "a mediocre party game mini-game collection." Nintendo Life praised its fun mini-games and amazing graphics and said, "if you don't mind the one-to one restriction of the mini-games, there's a lot of fun to be had here." They disliked a few mini-games saying "It's a few you can go without." They noted that the lack of attractions is disappointing. Game Informer called the Rabbids "party poopers". They disliked the tired infused board game concept and low replay value. They also stated that the animation was great, but overall the graphics weren't impressive, claiming that the game still could have been a Wii game. Nintendo World Report praised its fun couch multi-player, Off-TV Play and well-designed style, but criticized its low levels of difficulty, lack of creativity and disliked that only two players could play at a time.
