= List of Rabbids Invasion episodes =

Rabbids Invasion is an animated television series based on the Rabbids video game series. Four seasons and a special were produced by Ubisoft Film & Television, TeamTO, France Télévisions, and Anima.

== Series overview ==
Season	Segments	Episodes	Originally released	
Season	Segments	Episodes	First released	Last released
1	78	26	August 3, 2013	December 6, 2014
2	78	26	October 11, 2014	June 14, 2016
3	78	26	June 21, 2016	June 23, 2017
4	76	26	September 1, 2018	December 26, 2018
Mission to Mars			September 29, 2021	

== Episodes ==
=== Season 1 (2013–14) ===
No. overall	No. in season	Title	Directed by	Written by	Original release date	Prod. code	U.S. viewers (millions)
1a	1a	"Omelet Party"	Akama	Olivier Jean-Marie	August 3, 2013	101	2.60
The Rabbids become fascinated with the process of how chickens lay eggs.
1b	1b	"Rabbid Mollusk"	Akama	Hervé Benedetti & Nicolas Robin	August 3, 2013	101	2.60
The Rabbids play with starfish and an octopus, not knowing that they are interrupting a man's attempt to clean the windows of his shop.
1c	1c	"Rabbid, Are You There?"	Akama & Stéphane Mit	Fred Neidhardt	August 3, 2013	101	2.60
The Rabbids observe a thief in action while a sorcerer magic show is going on upstairs.
2a	2a	"Stop! No More!"	Fabien Ouvrard	Jean-Louis Momus	August 10, 2013	102	2.50
The Rabbids annoy a hitchhiker with their crazy Rabbid antics, then discover a gas station selling "singing" cards.
2b	2b	"Rabbids vs. the Vacuum Cleaner"	Fabien Ouvrard	Anne Hugo	August 10, 2013	102	2.50
A janitor's relaxing night gets disturbed with the Rabbids' awkward behavior at the supermarket.
2c	2c	"Runway Rabbids"	Akama & Stéphane Mit	Nicolas Gallet	August 10, 2013	102	2.50
The Rabbids disturb a game of tennis, then run loose in an airport.
3a	3a	"Rabbids Say Cheese"	Stéphane Mit	Agnes Slimovici	August 17, 2013	103	1.78
A photo booth is invaded by the Rabbids.
3b	3b	"Raving Lifeguard"	Akama & Stéphane Mit	Mélanie Duval	August 17, 2013	103	1.78
The Rabbids visit a beach and disturb several 3 old ladies and a lifeguard.
3c	3c	"Rabbid Market"	Akama, Fablen Ouvrard, & Laurent Masson	Fred Neidhardt	August 17, 2013	103	1.78
After viewing a commercial for pepper juice, which "makes you peppy," the Rabbids are enamored and go on a search for pepper juice at the supermarket.
4a	4a	"Elevatorus Rabbidinus"	Akama & Stéphane Mit	Nicolas Gallet	August 24, 2013	104	2.16
The Rabbids discover an elevator in a mall, believing that it is magic, then try on free hats.
4b	4b	"Until Rabbids Do You Part"	Stéphane Mit	Leimdo & Restier	August 24, 2013	104	2.16
The Rabbids interfere with wedding photos while trying to catch a fly.
4c	4c	"Rabbid Radar"	Stéphane Mit	Philippe Riche	August 24, 2013	104	2.16
The Rabbids drive a police officer crazy while the officer is trying to take pictures of licence plates.
5a	5a	"Fast Food Rabbid"	Fabien Ouvrard	Leimdo & Restier	September 14, 2013	106	2.50
An intercom at a drive-through proves to be much fun for the Rabbids.
5b	5b	"Rabbids Against the Machine"	Fabien Ouvrard	Leimdo & Restier	September 14, 2013	105	1.75
A Rabbid gets stuck in a vending machine trying to figure out how it works.
5c	5c	"Ring! Bwaah!"	Philippe Riche	Sébastien Guérout	September 14, 2013	105	1.75
The Rabbids find a women's smartphone in the park and start to have fun with it.
6a	6a	"Rabbid Playa"	Akama, Fablen Ouvrard, & Laurent Masson	Anne Hugo	September 21, 2013	106	2.50
The Rabbids play with a toy on the beach and battle a seagull for a pretzel.
6b	6b	"Radio Rabbid"	Fabien Ouvrard	Issabelle Bottier	September 21, 2013	105	1.75
After being scared of a radio station, the Rabbids discover that they can change radio stations; a Rabbid gets electrified when it stands too close to the radio.
6c	6c	"Escalator Rabbid"	Stéphane Mit	Sébastien Guérout	September 21, 2013	106	2.50
A Rabbid has to go up the down escalator to try to get some candy from his friends.
7a	7a	"Scout Rabbids"	Philippe Riche	Philippe Riche	September 28, 2013	107	2.05
The Rabbids get demoted from the Squirrel Patrol for not doing what they are told to do, and the leader gets accused of attacking an old lady and arrested.
7b	7b	"Jurassic Rabbid"	Fabien Ouvrard	Philippe Riche	September 28, 2013	107	2.05
The Rabbids try to unfreeze the "chin-curtained" Lapinibernatus.
7c	7c	"Moo Rabbids"	Stéphane Mit	Simon Lecocq	September 28, 2013	107	2.05
Several Rabbids discover a "cow in a can" toy on a beach while another one tries to talk to a seagull.
8a	8a	"Keypad Rabbids"	Stéphane Mit	Leimdo & Restier	October 12, 2013	108	2.19
Two Rabbids try to gain entrance into an apartment complex when one gets locked in.
8b	8b	"Special Agent Rabbids"	Fabien Ouvrard	Leimdo & Restier	October 12, 2013	108	2.19
The Rabbids interfere with a spy's mission to save a woman from a bomb.
8c	8c	"Schnoz Rabbid"	Philippe Riche	Philippe Riche	October 12, 2013	108	2.19
A Rabbid puts on a fake nose disguise and soon, he becomes the leader of the Rabbids; the Rabbid Leader gets jealous and wants a nose, too.
9a	9a	"Museum Rabbids"	Franz Kirchner	Candice Corbeel	November 2, 2013	109	2.09
The Rabbids cause a scene in an art museum.
9b	9b	"Kite Rabbids"	Wilson Dos Santos & Stéphane Mit	Yann Ropars	November 2, 2013	109	2.09
The Rabbids try to battle with a fan.
9c	9c	"Never Refreeze a Rabbid"	Franz Kirchner	Mélanie Duval	November 2, 2013	109	2.09
The Rabbids try to get frozen food out of a grocery store freezer.
10a	10a	"Music Rabbid"	Willson Dos Santos & Stéphane Mit	Simon Lecocq	November 9, 2013	110	2.26
The Rabbids are fascinated by a record player.
10b	10b	"Wake Up, Rabbids!"	Stéphane Mit	Denis Lima	November 9, 2013	110	2.26
The Rabbids battle an alarm clock.
10c	10c	"R.C. Rabbid"	Franz Kirchner	Yann Ropars	November 9, 2013	110	2.26
The Rabbids discover a remote-controlled car.
11a	11a	"Get in Line, Rabbids!"	Franz Kirchner	Leimdo & Restier	November 16, 2013	111	2.12
The Rabbids wait in line for a store opening.
11b	11b	"Sticky Rabbid"	Stéphane Mit	Yann Ropars	November 16, 2013	111	2.12
The Rabbids try to retrieve a sticker from a runner's shoe.
11c	11c	"Rabbid Test N°98002-c: the Platform"	Franz Kirchner	Sébestien Guérout	November 16, 2013	111	2.12
John and Gina experiment on two Rabbids.
12a	12a	"Rabbidocchio"	Franz Kirchner	Philippe Riche	November 23, 2013	112	2.02
An old man carves a wooden Rabbid puppet and thinks it came to life when a real Rabbid gets locked in his shop while playing "hide and seek".
12b	12b	"Rabbid Test N°98003-c: the Cube"	Wilson Dos Santos & Stéphane Mit	Jean-Louis Momus	November 23, 2013	112	2.02
Two Rabbids fight over a wooden toy block.
12c	12c	"Rabbids with Fleas"	Stéphane Mit	Simon Lecocq	November 23, 2013	112	2.02
The Rabbids play with a flea but try to avoid it when it starts biting them. At the end, a chick eats the flea.
13a	13a	"Rabbid Elevation"	Fabien Ouvrard	Sébastien Guérout	November 30, 2013	113	2.05
The Rabbids think an elevator will take them to the moon.
13b	13b	"Surprise Rabbid"	Stéphane Mit	Sébastien Guérout	November 30, 2013	113	2.05
A Rabbid hides in a cardboard box, in hopes of surprising the other Rabbids as well as ordinary people living in the town.
13c	13c	"Rabbid Test N°98001-c: the Mirror"	Franz Kirchner	Yann Ropars	November 30, 2013	113	2.05
John and Gina monitor the interactions of two Rabbids. Each are on the separate sides of the mirror.
14a	14a	"Super Rabbid"	Fabien Ouvrard	Philippe Riche	January 4, 2014	114	1.85
The Rabbids find a comic book. The Rabbid Leader is fascinated by the comic book and pretends to be a superhero like the one in the comics.
14b	14b	"Dueling Rabbids"	Franz Kirchner	Candice Corbeel	January 4, 2014	114	1.85
The Rabbids engage in a duel.
14c	14c	"Rabbid Test N°98004-c: the Animals"	Stéphane Mit	Sébastien Guérout	January 4, 2014	114	1.85
John and Gina test the Rabbids' intelligence by giving them the same intelligence tests as a chicken, a dog, and a fly.
15a	15a	"Flight of the Rabbids"	Stéphane Mit	Stéphane Mit	January 11, 2014	115	1.95
The Rabbid Leader attempts to fly.
15b	15b	"The Rabbid Who Fell to Earth"	Stéphane Mit	Stéphane Mit	January 11, 2014	115	1.95
After pretending to be a chicken and wearing a crazy disguise, a conspiracy theorist mistakes a Rabbid for an alien life form.
15c	15c	"Holy Rabbid-Cow!"	Franz Kirchner	Yann Ropars	January 11, 2014	115	1.95
The Rabbids are determined to catch a fly.
16a	16a	"Pecking Rabbid"	Franz Kirchner	Mélanie Duval	January 18, 2014	116	2.06
A Rabbid meets his match when it goes to the farm and faces a hungry chick.
16b	16b	"Rabbidmobile"	Fabien Ouvrard	Simon Lecocq	January 18, 2014	116	2.06
The Rabbids find an unlocked car.
16c	16c	"Prisoner Rabbid"	Franz Kirchner	Sébastien Guérout	January 18, 2014	116	2.06
Someone throws rubber balls at the Rabbids.
17a	17a	"Rabbid Dreams"	Fabien Ouvrard	Mélanie Duval	January 25, 2014	117	2.12
John and Gina observe the Rabbids' dreams, which relate to their previous experiences.
17b	17b	"Snoring Rabbid"	Franz Kirchner	Yann Ropars	January 25, 2014	117	2.12
The Rabbids try to move a heavy couch.
17c	17c	"Hypno Rabbid"	Stéphane Mit	Simon Lecocq & Stéphane Mit	January 25, 2014	117	2.12
A couple of Rabbids use hypnosis on the Rabbid Leader.
18a	18a	"Rabbid Race to the Moon"	Franz Kirchner	Candice Corbeel	February 1, 2014	118	2.45
The Rabbids compete to earn the right to blast off into space.
18b	18b	"Rabbid Games"	Stéphane Mit	Yann Ropars	February 1, 2014	118	2.45
The Rabbids challenge one another to a series of physical challenges. Meanwhile, a female Rabbid tries to sing a song to open the Rabbid Games.
18c	18c	"Rabbid Test Nº98005-c: the Blue Rabbid"	Stéphane Mit	Philippe Riche	February 1, 2014	118	2.45
John and Gina paint one Rabbid blue.
19a	19a	"Rabbid Doggies"	Stéphane Mit	Denis Lima	February 8, 2014	119	2.21
The Rabbids befriend two different types of dogs.
19b	19b	"Rabbid Test Nº98006-c: the Chair"	Stéphane Mit	Simon Lecocq	February 8, 2014	119	2.21
John and Gina observe the Rabbids trying to reach a trap door.
19c	19c	"Raving Thirst"	Franz Kirchner	Simon Lecocq	February 8, 2014	119	2.21
The Rabbids grow thirsty while trapped in the desert.
20a	20a	"Rabbid Like Me"	Stéphane Mit	Yann Ropars	February 15, 2014	120	2.64
John tries to blend in by dressing up as a Rabbid.
20b	20b	"Rabbid Mozart"	Franz Kirchner	Philippe Riche	February 15, 2014	120	2.64
After being hit on the head, a Rabbid gains the skills of a professional pianist.
20c	20c	"Raving Alien"	Fabien Ouvrard	Sébastien Guérout	February 15, 2014	120	2.64
An alien comes across a pair of Rabbids.
21a	21a	"Rabbid Parasol"	Stéphane Mit	Philippe Riche	April 5, 2014	121	2.08
The Rabbids fly using a beach umbrella.
21b	21b	"Rabbid Tummy Rumble"	Stéphane Mit	Sébastien Guérout	April 5, 2014	121	2.08
A Rabbid tries to quiet his rumbling stomach.
21c	21c	"Rabbid's Rules of Order"	Franz Kirchner	Sébastien Guérout	April 5, 2014	121	2.08
The Rabbids disrupt a lifeguard at the beach, again.
22a	22a	"Raving Chicken"	Franz Kirchner	Simon Lecocq	April 12, 2014	122	1.71
A Rabbid thinks he is a chicken after getting hit on the head.
22b	22b	"Plunger Rabbids"	Franz Kirchner	Sébastien Guérout	April 12, 2014	122	1.71
The Rabbids are fascinated with plungers.
22c	22c	"Rabbid Snob"	Stéphane Mit	Sébastien Guérout	April 12, 2014	122	1.71
A Rabbid teaches manners to his uncivilized friend.
23a	23a	"Vampire Rabbid"	Fabien Ouvrard	Philippe Riche	October 18, 2014	123	1.53
The Rabbids unintentionally star in their own horror story when they experiment with a mysterious instant growth tonic.
23b	23b	"Rabbid Halloween"	Stéphane Mit	Mélanie Duval	October 18, 2014	123	1.53
The Rabbids try their hand at trick or treating.
23c	23c	"Zombie Rabbid"	Fabien Ouvrard	Mélanie Duval	October 18, 2014	123	1.53
A Rabbid think his friends has turned into zombies when they accidentally eat rotten donuts. Meanwhile, the "zombie" Rabbids run behind the normal Rabbid, trying to explain what really happened.
24a	24a	"Safe Deposit Rabbids"	Fabien Ouvrard	Philippe Riche	April 19, 2014	124	1.51
The Rabbids are stuck in a bank vault after closing hours while a burglar plans to rob the bank. At the end, the Rabbids get out while the burglar gets locked in the bank vault and is arrested by a lot of police.
24b	24b	"Why Did the Rabbid Cross the Road?"	Stéphane Mit	Stéphane Mit	April 19, 2014	124	1.51
A Rabbid must cross a busy street to reach his friends.
24c	24c	"Dream On, Rabbid"	Stéphane Mit	Jean-Louis Momus	April 19, 2014	124	1.51
The Rabbids play on a construction site. Soon, they end up hypnotizing people into thinking they're Rabbids when they say "bwaaah" loudly into a pipe.
25a	25a	"Rabbid 2.0"	Laurent Masson	Sébastien Guérout	April 26, 2014	125	2.22
Lapinibernatus from "Jurassic Rabbit" crash-lands his time-machine on Earth.
25b	25b	"Rabbid Undies"	Stéphane Mit	Mélanie Duval	April 26, 2014	125	2.22
The Rabbids fight over a pair of underwear they stole from an old lady.
25c	25c	"Sneezy Rabbid"	Franz Kirchner	Philippe Riche	April 26, 2014	125	2.22
The Rabbids imitate sneezing when another Rabbid gets a cold from hiding in a freezer at the supermarket.
26a	26a	"O'Come All Ye Rabbids"	Franz Kirchner	Mélanie Duval	December 6, 2014	126	2.17
The Rabbids try to bring the spirit of Christmas by decorating a palm tree.
26b	26b	"Slippery and Soapy"	Stéphane Mit	Stéphane Mit	December 6, 2014	126	2.17
A Rabbid befriends a bar of soap.
26c	26c	"Rabbid Stick-Up"	Akama & Fabien Ouvrard	Fred Neidhardt	December 6, 2014	126	2.17
The Rabbids meet some crazy thieves.

=== Season 2 (2014–16) ===
No. overall	No. in season	Title	Directed by	Written by	Original release date	Prod. code	U.S. viewers (millions)
27a	1a	"Being Rabbid"	Arnaud Bouron	Christophe Leborgne	October 11, 2014	201	1.97
A scientist accidentally switches brains with a Rabbid.
27b	1b	"Rabbid Diet"	Stéphane Mit	Christophe Leborgne	October 11, 2014	201	1.97
The Rabbids try to fit in a rocket ship.
27c	1c	"Reflections in a Rabbid Eye"	Stéphane Mit	Thomas Coste	October 11, 2014	201	1.97
The Rabbids notice the Moons reflection.
28a	2a	"Green Rabbid"	Philippe Riche	Philippe Riche	November 1, 2014	202	1.73
A Rabbid plants a flower, hoping it reaches the Moon.
28b	2b	"Star Rabbid"	Pascal David	Sébastien Guéroud	November 1, 2014	202	1.73
A Rabbid deals with fame.
28c	2c	"Rabbid Obsession"	Arnaud Bouron	Philippe Riche	November 1, 2014	202	1.73
The Rabbids' new obsession intrigues John and Gina.
29a	3a	"Rabbidroid"	Stéphane Mit	Mélanie Duval	November 15, 2014	203	1.73
John builds a robot to do a Rabbid's job.
29b	3b	"Rabbid Compression"	Franz Kirchner	Christophe Leborgne	November 15, 2014	203	1.73
A Rabbid gets compressed with a pile of junk.
29c	3c	"Rabbid Fit"	Stéphane Mit	Sébastien Guéroud	November 15, 2014	203	1.73
After a crash of one of their Rockets, The Rabbids have a funeral for the fallen rocket, After one of them farts, One Rabbid started to laugh and can't stop, So his friends want to make him stop laughing by taping his mouth and buttocks, This doesn't work, So they try putting on a sad movie, Again it does not work. At the end, They blast him into space, where he continues to laugh.
30a	4a	"Guide-Rabbid"	Xavier de Broucker	Christophe Leborgne	November 22, 2014	204	1.60
A Rabbid poses as a guide dog.
30b	4b	"The Mystery of the Disappearing Rabbids"	Arnaud Bouron	Mélanie Duval	November 22, 2014	204	1.60
Some Rabbids start to vanish.
30c	4c	"Rabbids BFFs"	Stéphane Mit	Mélanie Duval	November 22, 2014	204	1.60
Two Rabbids become best friends.
31a	5a	"The Moon Rabbid"	Franz Kirchner	Mélanie Duval	June 6, 2015	205	1.62
The Rabbids mistake one of their own as an alien.
31b	5b	"Dreaming Rabbid"	Stéphane Mit	Sébastien Guéroud	June 6, 2015	205	1.62
A Rabbid dreams he's on the Moon.
31c	5c	"Rabbid Secrets"	Stéphane Mit	Sébastien Guéroud	June 6, 2015	205	1.62
A Rabbid tries to learn a secret.
32a	6a	"Love Rabbid"	Arnaud Bouron	Philippe Riche	June 13, 2015	206	1.47
A mean Rabbid turns nice after he's had an accident.
32b	6b	"Super Inventive Rabbids"	Stéphane Mit	Stéphane Mit	June 13, 2015	206	1.47
Four Rabbids suggest new propulsion ideas after a series of failed attempts at flying to the Moon.
32c	6c	"Welcome to Rabbidland"	Franz Kirchner	Franz Kirchner	June 13, 2015	206	1.47
A young Rabbid learns what it means to be a Rabbid.
33a	7a	"Run, Rabbid, Run!"	Arnaud Bouron	Sébastien Guéroud	June 20, 2015	207	2.01
A Rabbid runs back and forth from one mysterious location to another.
33b	7b	"Mafia Rabbids"	Franz Kirchner	Mélanie Duval	June 20, 2015	207	2.01
The Rabbids infiltrate another gang of Rabbids who have confiscated a stock of pepper juice.
33c	7c	"Wild West Rabbid"	Arnaud Bouron	Thomas Coste	June 20, 2015	207	2.01
A Rabbid cowboy searches for the outlaw who destroyed his rocking horse.
34a	8a	"Dressed Up Rabbid"	Stéphane Mit	Stéphane Mit	June 27, 2015	208	1.74
Rabbid workers must move a heavy cement mixer.
34b	8b	"Self-Conscious Rabbid"	Arnaud Bouron	Christophe Leborgne	June 27, 2015	208	1.74
One of the Rabbids' ears gets stuck.
34c	8c	"Rabbid Associates"	Franz Kirchner	Philippe Riche	June 27, 2015	208	1.74
A Rabbid sets out to steal a reactor.
35a	9a	"Rabbid Home"	Xavier de Broucker	Christophe Leborgne	December 7, 2015 (Nicktoons)	209	0.06
Three Rabbids get banned from the junkyard and are rolled into an unlocked house.
35b	9b	"Rabbid Toast"	Franz Kirchner	Franz Kirchner	December 7, 2015 (Nicktoons)	209	0.06
A Rabbid builds a giant toaster to get to the Moon.
35c	9c	"Voiceless Rabbid"	Stéphane Mit	Stéphane Mit	December 7, 2015 (Nicktoons)	209	0.06
A Rabbid loses his voice.
36a	10a	"Rabbid Rocket for Grandma"	Franz Kirchner	Thomas Coste	December 9, 2015 (Nicktoons)	210	0.12
The Rabbids find an old lady stuck in her chair lift and use it to go to the Moon.
36b	10b	"Being Rabbid – Part 2"	Franz Kirchner	Arnaud Bouron	December 9, 2015 (Nicktoons)	210	0.12
While still trapped inside a Rabbid's body, John the scientist tries to fix the situation.
36c	10c	"Appallo 11"	Franz Kirchner	Philippe Riche	December 9, 2015 (Nicktoons)	210	0.12
Two Rabbids crash land in the desert but they think they've landed on the Moon.
37a	11a	"Rabbid Invaders"	Xavier de Broucker	Philippe Riche	December 11, 2015 (Nicktoons)	211	0.08
A teenager named Zak thinks the Rabbids are taking over the world.
37b	11b	"Mother Rabbid"	Stéphane Mit	Stéphane Mit	December 11, 2015 (Nicktoons)	211	0.08
Zak thinks his mom got turned into a Rabbid when actually a Rabbid has swallowed a walkie talkie.
37c	11c	"Rabbid Babysitting"	Pascal David	Mélanie Duval	December 11, 2015 (Nicktoons)	211	0.08
A baby inadvertently gets swapped with a Rabbid at the babysitter's expense. With two Rabbids now trying and failing to make the baby stop crying and the babysitter now treating one Rabbid with baby bottles and diapers.
38a	12a	"An Intruder Among the Rabbids"	Xavier de Broucker	Thomas Coste	December 14, 2015 (Nicktoons)	212	0.11
Zak disguises himself as a Rabbid to prove that they're going to take over the world.
38b	12b	"Buddy Rabbids"	Stéphane Mit	Stéphane Mit	December 14, 2015 (Nicktoons)	212	0.11
A Rabbid befriends Zak's new robot.
38c	12c	"Rabbids Stage Coach"	Arnaud Bouron	Arnaud Bouron	December 14, 2015 (Nicktoons)	212	0.11
Two gang of Rabbid cowboys fight over some chickens.
39a	13a	"Sulky Rabbid"	Xavier de Broucker	Sébastien Guérout	December 16, 2015 (Nicktoons)	213	0.13
A Rabbid gets his feelings hurt.
39b	13b	"Love-Struck Rabbid"	Xavier de Broucker	Philippe Riche	December 16, 2015 (Nicktoons)	213	0.13
A Rabbid falls in love with Zak.
39c	13c	"Moonless Rabbids"	Stéphane Mit	Stéphane Mit	December 16, 2015 (Nicktoons)	213	0.13
The Rabbids think the Moon has disappeared.
40a	14a	"The Last Rabbid"	Franz Kirchner	Philippe Riche	January 10, 2016	215	1.30
After launching his buddies to the Moon with a see-saw, a Rabbid is the last one to be launched but has no one to launch him.
40b	14b	"Mini-Rabbid"	Franz Kirchner	Franz Kirchner	January 10, 2016	215	1.30
A Rabbid shrinks when it gets caught in the clothes dryer.
40c	14c	"Rabbid Negotiation"	Xavier de Broucker	Thomas Coste	January 10, 2016	215	1.30
The police are called when the Rabbids cause a ruckus in a house.
41a	15a	"Rabbid Test Pilot"	Stéphane Mit	Philippe Riche	January 17, 2016	216	1.47
A Rabbid looks for a test pilot.
41b	15b	"Rabbid Brass Band"	Xavier de Broucker	Philippe Riche	January 17, 2016	216	1.47
The Rabbids start a band when a cloud stops a rocket launch.
41c	15c	"Mini Rabbid vs. Giant Chicken"	Franz Kirchner	Franz Kirchner	January 17, 2016	216	1.47
Professor Mad Rabbid accidentally turns a Rabbid and a chicken into giants.
42a	16a	"Rabbid Fetch"	Arnaud Bouron	Arnaud Bouron	January 24, 2016	217	1.23
The Rabbids try to find a playmate to play fetch with.
42b	16b	"Rabbid Escape"	Xavier de Broucker	Philippe Riche	January 24, 2016	217	1.23
The Rabbids crash land on a prison van.
42c	16c	"Rabbid Werewolf"	Xavier de Broucker	Mélanie Duval	January 24, 2016	217	1.23
After putting some hair shampoo on, a Rabbid turns into a werewolf.
43a	17a	"Invisible Rabbid"	Franz Kirchner	Sébastien Guérout	January 31, 2016	218	1.13
Professor Mad Rabbid turns himself invisible.
43b	17b	"Rabbid Anthem"	Stéphane Mit	Clément Savoyat	January 31, 2016	218	1.13
A Rabbid tries to become a good singer at the rocket launch.
43c	17c	"The Incredible Rabbid Space Time Machine"	Franz Kirchner	Mélanie Duval	January 31, 2016	218	1.13
Professor Mad Rabbid creates a washing machine that can travel through space and time.
44a	18a	"Rabbiddoll"	Xavier de Broucker	Thomas Coste	February 7, 2016	214	1.26
After a Rabbid accidentally gets stuck in a doll box, a little girl named Alice thinks the Rabbid is the doll.
44b	18b	"Rabbid Stratagems"	Franz Kirchner	Franz Kirchner	February 7, 2016	214	1.26
The Rabbids use different strategies to get Alice to give up her tricycle so they can build their rocket.
44c	18c	"A Rabbid's Valentine"	Xavier de Broucker	Mélanie Duval	February 7, 2016	214	1.26
A Rabbid thinks by falling in love, you can go to the Moon. So he falls in love with a doll.
45a	19a	"Rabbidstein"	Franz Kirchner	Philippe Riche	April 19, 2016 (Nicktoons)	221	0.09
Professor Mad Rabbid decides to make an assistant for himself.
45b	19b	"Anti Grabbidy"	Arnaud Bouron	Arnaud Bouron	April 19, 2016 (Nicktoons)	221	0.09
Professor Mad Rabbid invents an anti-gravity ray.
45c	19c	"Rabbid Dummy"	Franz Kirchner	Clément Savoyat	April 19, 2016 (Nicktoons)	221	0.09
A Rabbid falls in love with a ventriloquist dummy.
46a	20a	"Two Rabbids in Orbit"	Fabien Ouvrard	Rémi Verrière	April 26, 2016 (Nicktoons)	222	0.14
Two rabbids run out of fuel after launching their rocket into space.
46b	20b	"Rabbid Remote"	Stéphane Mit	Mélanie Duval	April 26, 2016 (Nicktoons)	222	0.14
Professor Mad Rabbid invents a remote that alters with time.
46c	20c	"Rabbid School"	Guillaume Rio	Camille Fery, Cédric Lachenaud, & Julie Maréchal	April 26, 2016 (Nicktoons)	222	0.14
When the Rabbids crash land and lose a gear to their rocket, they must sit through Alice's pretend school in order to get it.
47a	21a	"Lost Rabbids"	Xavier de Broucker	Sébastien Guérout	May 3, 2016 (Nicktoons)	223	0.21
The Rabbids get locked in the supermarket after closing time.
47b	21b	"The Curse of Rabbidkhamun"	Arnaud Bouron	Philippe Riche	May 3, 2016 (Nicktoons)	223	0.21
The Rabbids accidentally wake up a mummy Rabbid.
47c	21c	"Mad Rabbid vs. the Robots"	Stéphane Mit	Clément Savoyat	May 3, 2016 (Nicktoons)	223	0.21
Professor Mad Rabbid builds a robot.
48a	22a	"Rabbids Gang"	Arnaud Bouron	Arnaud Bouron	May 10, 2016 (Nicktoons)	225	0.15
Two gangs of Rabbids have a dance off.
48b	22b	"Glow Rabbid"	Guillaume Rio	Christophe Leborgne	May 10, 2016 (Nicktoons)	225	0.15
A Rabbid accidentally swallows a flashlight, giving him the ability to glow.
48c	22c	"Rabbids Go Skiing"	Stéphane Mit	Mélanie Duval	May 10, 2016 (Nicktoons)	225	0.15
A Rabbid's prank backfires when he accidentally glues two wooden planks to his feet.
49a	23a	"Dr. Mad Rabbid's Super-Duper Iron-Clad Underpants"	Guillaume Rio	Mélanie Duval	May 17, 2016 (Nicktoons)	226	0.18
Professor Mad Rabbid invents a pair of iron underpants.
49b	23b	"Monstrous Rabbids"	Stéphane Mit	Philippe Riche	May 17, 2016 (Nicktoons)	226	0.18
Vampire Rabbid, Werewolf Rabbid and Rabbidstein go out on the town on Halloween.
49c	23c	"Mad Rabbid and the Genius's Mustache"	Arnaud Bouron	Philippe Riche	May 17, 2016 (Nicktoons)	226	0.18
Professor Mad Rabbid has a flashback of when he got a mustache from Alice.
50a	24a	"Feathered Rabbid"	Stéphane Mit	Stéphane Mit	May 24, 2016 (Nicktoons)	219	0.12
A Rabbid builds a wagon to take him to the Moon, but he needs an animal to pull the wagon.
50b	24b	"Queen of Rabbid"	Arnaud Bouron	Clément Savoyat	May 24, 2016 (Nicktoons)	219	0.12
The Rabbids think Alice is a real magician.
50c	24c	"Rabbid Amnesia"	Arnaud Bouron	Sébastien Guérout	May 24, 2016 (Nicktoons)	219	0.12
Zak wakes up in the desert with amnesia and uses a video he made to help retrace his steps.
51a	25a	"Rabbid 00Zilch"	Franz Kirchner	Sébastien Guérout	June 7, 2016 (Nicktoons)	224	0.16
A rogue Rabbid plans to destroy the Moon.
51b	25b	"Mad Rabbid and the Rabbid Clones"	Arnaud Bouron	Philippe Riche	June 7, 2016 (Nicktoons)	224	0.16
Professor Mad Rabbid finds a way to make clones of himself.
51c	25c	"Mad Fly Rabbid"	Fabien Ouvrard	Mélanie Duval	June 7, 2016 (Nicktoons)	224	0.16
Professor Mad Rabbid accidentally gets turned into part of a fly.
52a	26a	"Rabbid of the Third Kind (Part 1)"	Philippe Riche	Philippe Riche & Mélanie Duval	June 14, 2016 (Nicktoons)	220	0.12
John the scientist tries an experiment on three Rabbids.
52b	26b	"The Pact of the Super Rabbids (Part 2)"	Philippe Riche	Philippe Riche & Mélanie Duval	June 14, 2016 (Nicktoons)	220	0.12
The three Rabbids become superheroes.
52c	26c	"On the Rabbid Trail (Part 3)"	Philippe Riche	Philippe Riche & Mélanie Duval	June 14, 2016 (Nicktoons)	220	0.12
The super Rabbids board the president's plane.

=== Season 3 (2016–17) ===
Note: This is the last season to air on Nickelodeon/Nicktoons. The next season was released by Netflix worldwide.

No. overall	No. in season	Title	Directed by	Written by	Original release date	Prod. code	U.S. viewers (millions)
53a	1a	"Rabbid on Film"	Stéphane Mit	Clément Savoyat	June 21, 2016 (Nicktoons)	303	0.12
The Rabbids try to make their own blockbuster movie.
53b	1b	"Bubble-Wrap Rabbid"	Guillaume Rio	Florian Guzek	June 21, 2016 (Nicktoons)	303	0.12
Lapinibernatus creates a bubble device to keep the other Rabbids out.
53c	1c	"Rabbid Theory"	Arnaud Bouron	Arnaud Bouron	June 21, 2016 (Nicktoons)	303	0.12
John the scientist picks up Lapinibernatus as a test subject.
54a	2a	"Odd Rabbid Out"	Franz Kirchner	Franz Kirchner	June 28, 2016 (Nicktoons)	301	0.17
Lapinibernatus tries to get his time traveling device back from the Rabbids.
54b	2b	"Rabbid on Repeat"	Arnaud Bouron	Camille Fery & Cédric Lachenaud	June 28, 2016 (Nicktoons)	301	0.17
After the Rabbids repeatedly keep crushing a gift for Lapinibernatus, he uses his time traveling device to go back and try to open his gift before it gets destroyed again.
54c	2c	"Rabbid Real Estate Rampage"	Guillaume Rio	Rémi Verrière	June 28, 2016 (Nicktoons)	301	0.17
A builder traps all the Rabbids and Lapinibernatus so he can build a house on the Rabbids' junkyard, and Lapinibernatus needs to be free before his time machine runs out of time.
55a	3a	"Checkpoint Rabbid"	Stéphane Mit	Julien David	July 5, 2016 (Nicktoons)	302	0.08
In order to work on his time machine, Lapinibernatus sets up a checkpoint to keep the other Rabbids at bay.
55b	3b	"Lost Ball Rabbids"	Franz Kirchner	Franz Kirchner	July 5, 2016 (Nicktoons)	302	0.08
The Rabbids accidentally hit a ball over a fence. Note: This segment is scheduled to air on June 21, 2016, but was replaced by "Rabbid Theory".
55c	3c	"Rabbidus Carnivorous"	Guillaume Rio	Sébastien Guérout	July 5, 2016 (Nicktoons)	302	0.08
A Rabbid uses the time machine to get some eggs and accidentally brings back carnivorous plant eggs.
56a	4a	"Rabbid Tribe"	Franz Kirchner	Franz Kirchner	July 12, 2016 (Nicktoons)	306	0.15
A Rabbid goes back in time and encounters a mysterious Rabbid tribe.
56b	4b	"Rabbid Mate"	Guillaume Rio	Guillaume Rio	July 12, 2016 (Nicktoons)	306	0.15
Lapinibernatus and a group of Rabbids battle over control of a robot.
56c	4c	"Gorilla Rabbid"	Arnaud Bouron	Arnaud Bouron	July 12, 2016 (Nicktoons)	306	0.15
Professor Mad Rabbid accidentally turns his assistant into a giant.
57a	5a	"Rabbid on Trial"	Stéphane Mit	Philippe Riche	July 19, 2016 (Nicktoons)	309	0.12
Lapinibernatus falls victim to the Rabbid justice system.
57b	5b	"Biker Rabbids"	Stéphane Mit	Stéphane Mit	July 19, 2016 (Nicktoons)	309	0.12
Lapinibernatus joins a biker gang.
57c	5c	"Rabbid Twin"	Pascal David	Pascal David	July 19, 2016 (Nicktoons)	309	0.12
Professor Mad Rabbid clones his assistant.
58a	6a	"Rabbid Knights"	Arnaud Bouron	Arnaud Bouron	July 26, 2016 (Nicktoons)	304	0.13
Two Rabbids go back into the medieval ages.
58b	6b	"Rabbid Assistants"	Stéphane Mit	Florian Guzek & Philippe Riche	July 26, 2016 (Nicktoons)	304	0.13
Professor Mad Rabbid and his assistant hunt for donuts.
58c	6c	"Rabbid Soundtrack"	Franz Kirchner	Franz Kirchner	July 26, 2016 (Nicktoons)	304	0.13
A Rabbid discovers a pair of headphones.
59a	7a	"Flying Rabbids"	Arnaud Bouron	Arnaud Bouron	August 2, 2016 (Nicktoons)	307	0.25
A Rabbid tries to learn how to fly in order to impress his crush.
59b	7b	"Voodoo Rabbid"	Guillaume Rio	Guillaume Rio	August 2, 2016 (Nicktoons)	307	0.25
The Rabbids learn to harness the power of voodoo dolls.
59c	7c	"Animal Rabbid"	Franz Kirchner	Sébastien Guérout	August 2, 2016 (Nicktoons)	307	0.25
Professor Mad Rabbid tries to quiet his assistant down with a potion, but he accidentally made his assistant speak in animal sounds.
60a	8a	"Rabbid Re-Freeze"	Stéphane Mit	Philippe Riche	August 9, 2016 (Nicktoons)	308	0.15
Lapinibernatus accidentally gets frozen again.
60b	8b	"Rabbid Nightmare"	Franz Kirchner	Philippe Riche	August 9, 2016 (Nicktoons)	308	0.15
Zak and his grandma head to the woods for a camping trip.
60c	8c	"Being Rabbid – Part 3"	Rémi Verrière	Rémi Verrière & Philippe Riche	August 9, 2016 (Nicktoons)	308	0.15
Gina's brain is swapped with a Rabbid's, and John accidentally sends her to the junkyard, where she meets Lapinibernatus.
61a	9a	"Rabbid Quiz"	Arnaud Bouron	Arnaud Bouron	August 16, 2016 (Nicktoons)	305	0.11
The Rabbids take over a TV game show.
61b	9b	"Mona Rabbida"	Stéphane Mit	Julien David	August 16, 2016 (Nicktoons)	305	0.11
A Rabbid goes back in time and falls in love with the Mona Lisa painting.
61c	9c	"Team Rabbid"	Guillaume Rio	Philippe Riche	August 16, 2016 (Nicktoons)	305	0.11
Lapinibernatus is forced to join a Rabbid sports team.
62a	10a	"Radioactive Rabbid"	Pascal David	Camille Fery & Cédric Lachenaud	August 23, 2016 (Nicktoons)	310	0.08
Professor Mad Rabbid's assistant accidentally swallows plutonium.
62b	10b	"Rabbid Handcuffs"	Stéphane Mit	Stéphane Mit	August 23, 2016 (Nicktoons)	310	0.08
Lapinibernatus gets handcuffed to a police Rabbid.
62c	10c	"Rabbidzzzzzz"	Guillaume Rio	Guillaume Rio	August 23, 2016 (Nicktoons)	310	0.08
The Rabbids keep Lapinibernatus from napping.
63a	11a	"Rabbidbowl – Part 1"	Guillaume Rio	Philippe Riche	September 25, 2016 (Nicktoons)	312	0.12
Lapinibernatus puts together a team for the Rabbid Bowl.
63b	11b	"Rabbidbowl – Part 2"	Guillaume Rio	Philippe Riche	September 25, 2016 (Nicktoons)	312	0.12
The Rabbids continue their Rabbid Bowl.
63c	11c	"An Alien Amongst the Rabbids"	Rémi Verrière & Laurent Masson	Fab	September 25, 2016 (Nicktoons)	312	0.12
An alien comes to the junkyard looking for a spacecraft.
64a	12a	"Helpful Rabbid"	Clément Savoyat	Fab	October 2, 2016 (Nicktoons)	313	0.12
A Rabbid intends to be a helpful assistant.
64b	12b	"Time Travel Rabbids"	Stéphane Mit	Stéphane Mit	October 2, 2016 (Nicktoons)	313	0.12
Two Rabbids use the time machine as a tourist attraction.
64c	12c	"Excalirabbid"	Guillaume Rio	Philippe Riche	October 2, 2016 (Nicktoons)	313	0.12
Professor Mad Rabbid accidentally sends his multipurpose plunger to the middle ages.
65a	13a	"The March of the Rabbids"	Pascal David	Camille Fery & Cédric Lachenaud	October 9, 2016 (Nicktoons)	314	0.16
Mini Rabbid gets mistaken for a baby penguin.
65b	13b	"Rabbid Fishing"	Franz Kirchner	Franz Kirchner	October 9, 2016 (Nicktoons)	314	0.16
The Rabbids try to revive a frozen fish by throwing him back in the ocean.
65c	13c	"Rabbid Ahoy"	Franz Kirchner	Franz Kirchner	October 9, 2016 (Nicktoons)	314	0.16
The Rabbids dress as pirates and take to the high seas.
66a	14a	"Rabbids at the Edge of the World"	Pascal David	Arnaud Bouron	October 16, 2016 (Nicktoons)	315	0.10
A pair of hungry Rabbids stumble upon the scientists' frozen research station.
66b	14b	"Rabbid Dad"	Guillaume Rio	Clément Savoyat	October 16, 2016 (Nicktoons)	315	0.10
A Rabbid trains a baby penguin to surf.
66c	14c	"Rabbid Treasure"	Stéphane Mit	Stéphane Mit	October 16, 2016 (Nicktoons)	315	0.10
An adventurous Rabbid goes on a quest.
67a	15a	"Rabbid Countdown"	Stéphane Mit	Camille Fery & Cédric Lachenaud	October 23, 2016 (Nicktoons)	311	0.18
A kitten gets trapped in the teleporter.
67b	15b	"Heroic Rabbids"	Guillaume Rio	Clément Savoyat	October 23, 2016 (Nicktoons)	311	0.18
Professor Mad Rabbid makes a potion that turns him into a villain mastermind.
67c	15c	"Teleportarabbids"	Philippe Riche	Philippe Riche	October 23, 2016 (Nicktoons)	311	0.18
A Rabbid discovers a teleporting television.
68a	16a	"Rabbid Santa"	Guillaume Rio	Florian Guzek	December 11, 2016 (Nicktoons)	319	0.15
A Rabbid pretends to be Santa Claus.
68b	16b	"Snow Rabbid"	Pascal David	Lionel Dutemple	December 11, 2016 (Nicktoons)	319	0.15
A Rabbid yearns to scare his buddies.
68c	16c	"Egg-ceptional Rabbid"	Clément Savoyat	Clément Savoyat	December 11, 2016 (Nicktoons)	319	0.15
A Rabbid tries to get a penguin a new egg.
69a	17a	"Rabbid Charming"	Pascal David	Clément Savoyat	May 26, 2017 (Nicktoons)	316	0.09
Two Rabbids attempt to build a castle out of ice blocks.
69b	17b	"Freezing Rabbid – Part 1"	Franz Kirchner	Philippe Riche	May 26, 2017 (Nicktoons)	316	0.09
Werewolf Rabbid gets transported to the scientists' research lab.
69c	17c	"Freezing Rabbid – Part 2"	Franz Kirchner	Philippe Riche	May 26, 2017 (Nicktoons)	316	0.09
John tries to face up to Werewolf Rabbid.
70a	18a	"Rabbid Power"	Franz Kirchner	Franz Kirchner	May 26, 2017 (Nicktoons)	317	0.08
John thinks he can use the Rabbids' love of pretzels to power up the research station.
70b	18b	"Rabbid 000 vs. The Penguins"	Guillaume Rio	Philippe Riche	May 26, 2017 (Nicktoons)	317	0.08
The evil mastermind Rabbid thinks he has got 000 right where he wants him.
70c	18c	"Rabbid Penguin"	Stéphane Mit	Stéphane Mit	May 26, 2017 (Nicktoons)	317	0.08
The tables turn when a Rabbid transforms into a penguin.
71a	19a	"Rabbid Wheel"	Pascal David	Arnaud Bouron	June 2, 2017 (Nicktoons)	320	0.09
The rabbids step back in time to when man first discovers the wheel.
71b	19b	"Super Rabbid vs. Super Penguins"	Pascal David	Emmanuel Poulain Arnaud	June 2, 2017 (Nicktoons)	320	0.09
One of the super Rabbids gets kicked out of the trio and then starts his own super team.
71c	19c	"Rabbid Toothbrush"	Guillaume Rio	Emmanuel Poulain Arnaud	June 2, 2017 (Nicktoons)	320	0.09
A rabbid on a cleaning spree goes back to the prehistoric era.
72a	20a	"Bowling Rabbid"	Pascal David	Sébastien Guérout	June 2, 2017 (Nicktoons)	318	0.09
Rabbids mistake a group of penguins as bowling pins.
72b	20b	"Customer Service Rabbid"	Rémi Verrière	Camille Fery & Cédric Lachenaud	June 2, 2017 (Nicktoons)	318	0.09
When a rabbid cannot reach a donut, he calls for help.
72c	20c	"Rabbid Epidemic"	Guillaume Rio	Guillaume Rio	June 2, 2017 (Nicktoons)	318	0.09
A nurse rabbid, obsessed with treating everything around him, finds himself in the arctic research station.
73a	21a	"Tricycle Rabbid"	Pascal David	Tigran Rosine	June 9, 2017 (Nicktoons)	321	0.14
The rabbids take a tricycle back to prehistoric times.
73b	21b	"Neat Freak Rabbid"	Franz Kirchner	Franz Kirchner	June 9, 2017 (Nicktoons)	321	0.14
A rabbid who is obsessed with cleaning goes back in time to help clean up the prehistoric era.
73c	21c	"Copycat Rabbid"	Julien Charles	Lionel Dutemple	June 9, 2017 (Nicktoons)	321	0.14
Copycat Rabbid is propelled into prehistoric times along with a rearview mirror.
74a	22a	"Defibrillator Rabbid"	Guillaume Rio	Sébastien Guérout	June 9, 2017 (Nicktoons)	323	0.15
A rabbid finds himself transported back to prehistoric times and becomes a hero thanks to his machine.
74b	22b	"Rabbid Breakdown"	Stéphane Mit	Marine & Cédric Lachenaud	June 9, 2017 (Nicktoons)	323	0.15
Professor Mad Rabbid and his assistant get stuck in time.
74c	22c	"Safety Rabbid"	Pascal David	Pascal David	June 9, 2017 (Nicktoons)	323	0.15
A rabbid goes back to the stone age.
75a	23a	"Rabbid Park"	Clément Savoyat	Marine & Cédric Lachenaud	June 16, 2017 (Nicktoons)	324	N/A
A Rabbid brings the dodoraptor back to the junkyard.
75b	23b	"Rabbid Enlightment"	Clément Savoyat	Philippe Riche	June 16, 2017 (Nicktoons)	324	N/A
A Rabbid teaches the caveman family how to live in modern times.
75c	23c	"Between a Rabbid and a Hard Place"	Julien Charles	Sébastien Guérout	June 16, 2017 (Nicktoons)	324	N/A
A Rabbid angers the dodoraptor by taking its egg.
76a	24a	"Rabbid Cruise"	Guillaume Rio	Guillaume Rio	June 16, 2017 (Nicktoons)	325	N/A
The Rabbids accidentally take an old lady back to the prehistoric times.
76b	24b	"Rabbid Little Brother"	Stéphane Mit	Stéphane Mit	June 16, 2017 (Nicktoons)	325	N/A
A Rabbid becomes the caveman daughter's little brother.
76c	24c	"Spit-Roast Rabbid"	Rémi Verrière	Philippe Riche	June 16, 2017 (Nicktoons)	325	N/A
A Rabbid tries to escape the hungry caveman family.
77a	25a	"Rabbindigestion"	Stéphane Mit	Stéphane Mit	June 23, 2017 (Nicktoons)	322	N/A
Two Rabbids get separated in the prehistoric era.
77b	25b	"A Cro-magnon Among the Rabbids"	Pascal David	Arnaud Bouron	June 23, 2017 (Nicktoons)	322	N/A
When some Rabbids come across a caveman, They accidentally take him to the present.
77c	25c	"Nanny Rabbid"	Julien Charles	Philippe Riche	June 23, 2017 (Nicktoons)	322	N/A
Equipping themselves at the supermarket for a little getaway to prehistoric times, two Rabbids take the wrong shopping cart and mistakenly load a sleeping baby into the cart. It is only once they have landed in prehistory that they discover the infant among the gear piled up on the time machine. Once the surprise is over, the Rabbids decide to integrate the infant into their team and against all odds, find him very useful to face the thousand dangers of prehistory thanks to his crying.
78a	26a	"Dr. Mad Rabbid's Daughter"	Guillaume Rio	Philippe Riche	June 23, 2017 (Nicktoons)	326	N/A
Professor Mad Rabbid tries to get his doll back from Alice.
78b	26b	"Rabbid Heatwave – Part 1"	Franz Kirchner	Franz Kirchner	June 23, 2017 (Nicktoons)	326	N/A
The Rabbids transport icebergs to the junkyard due to a heatwave.
78c	26c	"Rabbid Heatwave – Part 2"	Franz Kirchner	Franz Kirchner	June 23, 2017 (Nicktoons)	326	N/A
Due to a misunderstanding, all the humans (except Zak) believe the Rabbids are heroes and treat them with respect.

=== Season 4 (2018) ===
No. overall	No. in season	Title	Directed by	Written by	Original release date	Prod. code	U.S. viewers (millions)
79	1	"Mad Rabbid and the Secret of the Flying Submarine"	Guilaume Rio & Clément Savoyat	Philippe Riche	September 1, 2018	401	N/A
Mad Rabbid discovers a submarine buried underneath the junkyard.
80a	2a	"The Revenge of the Rabbid Mole"	Clément Savoyat	Philippe Riche	September 1, 2018	402	N/A
Mole Rabbid attacks the submarine for his revenge.
80b	2b	"Rabbid Special Unit"	Clément Savoyat	Philippe Riche	September 1, 2018	402	N/A
The Three Rabbids accidentally get left behind by the submarine, resulting in Zack trying to bring them back.
80c	2c	"Rabbid Elit"	Guillaume Rio	Philippe Riche	September 1, 2018	402	N/A
A group of Rabbids accidentally stumble into the evil lair of Otto Torx.
81a	3a	"Rabbid as a Doorknob"	Guillaume Rio	Antoine Colomb	September 8, 2018	403	N/A
A Rabbid accidentally swallows a hearing aid, resulting in him hearing everything louder than before. The Rabbid now needs to find a quiet place.
81b	3b	"Rabbid Picnic"	Clément Savoyat	Clément Savoyat	September 8, 2018	403	N/A
A group of Rabbids have a picnic in the woods.
81c	3c	"Rabbid Brain Exchange"	Guillaume Rio	Emmanuel Poulain-Arnaud	September 8, 2018	403	N/A
A Rabbid switches brains with a dinosaur, making another Rabbid terrified.
82a	4a	"Rabbid of the Jungle"	Clément Savoyat	Philippe Riche	September 15, 2018	404	N/A
Jungle Rabbid must protect a chick from the other Rabbids who want to hurt it.
82b	4b	"Rabbid Princess"	Guillaume Rio	Lionel Dutemple	September 15, 2018	404	N/A
Princess Rabbid stumbles upon a biker gang after a costume mishap.
82c	4c	"Rabbid Jailbirds"	Guillaume Rio	Antoine Colomb	September 15, 2018	404	N/A
A group of prisoner Rabbids attempt to escape from prison.
83a	5a	"Rabbid Jockey"	Clément Savoyat	Sébastein Guérout	September 22, 2018	405	N/A
Two jockey Rabbids race against each other to prove who's the best.
83b	5b	"Viking Rabbids"	Clément Savoyat	Sébastein Guérout	September 22, 2018	405	N/A
A group of Rabbids become vikings and seek revenge on a cow while finding a doll and Alice to join them.
83c	5c	"Rabbid Road-Warrior"	Clément Savoyat	Romain Rossard	September 22, 2018	405	N/A
After the sub loses power, Mad Rabbid sends a rabbid to steal pepper juice from Biker Rabbids.
84a	6a	"Tropical Rabbids"	Guillaume Rio	Romain Rossard	September 29, 2018	406	N/A
A Rabbid must defend himself from a tribe of tribal Rabbids.
84b	6b	"Rabbid-Dragon"	Guillaume Rio	Emmanuel Poulain-Arnaud	September 29, 2018	406	N/A
Two Rabbids compete against each other to bring a flower to impress Princess Rabbid.
84c	6c	"Boxing Rabbids"	Guillaume Rio	Sébastein Guérout	September 29, 2018	406	N/A
A Rabbid accidentally angers a biker gang, resulting in him going into a boxing match against the hulking Gorilla Rabbid.
85a	7a	"Rabbid Clowns"	Clément Savoyat	Pascal David	October 6, 2018	407	N/A
A group of Rabbids discover and play with gags from a truck carrying funny objects.
85b	7b	"Rabbid and the Barbecue of Doom"	Guillaume Rio	Antoine Colomb	October 6, 2018	407	N/A
Explorer Rabbid discovers a powerful amulet that Torx attempted to gain first.
85c	7c	"No Costume for a Rabbid"	Clément Savoyat	Pascal David	October 6, 2018	407	N/A
A Rabbid tries to find a perfect costume in order to get into a costume party.
86a	8a	"Rabbid Cupid"	Clément Savoyat	Pascal David	October 13, 2018	408	N/A
Mad Rabbid helps a Rabbid fall in love by dressing himself up as Cupid.
86b	8b	"Little Red Rabbid Hood"	Antoine Colomb	Antoine Colomb	October 13, 2018	408	N/A
A Rabbid (who is dressed up as Red Riding Hood) must defend herself from Wolf Rabbid.
86c	8c	"Teddy-Rabbid"	Clément Savoyat	Capucine Lewalle	October 13, 2018	408	N/A
A Rabbid becomes a teddy bear which almost caused him to get snatched by a baby.
87a	9a	"Rabbid's Island"	Guillaume Rio	Emmanuel Poulain-Armand & Armand Robin	October 20, 2018	409	N/A
Pirate Rabbids attempt to find pirate treasure on a desert island.
87b	9b	"The Masked Rabbid"	Clément Savoyat	Sébastein Guérout	October 20, 2018	409	N/A
An outlaw Rabbid must avoid Sheriff Rabbid.
87c	9c	"Musketeer Rabbid"	Clément Savoyat	Sébastein Guérout	October 20, 2018	409	N/A
The Rabbids host a mustache-themed party.
88a	10a	"Rabbids in the Maze"	Guillaume Rio	Romain Rossard & Erwan Witschger	November 17, 2018	410	N/A
Torx uses some Rabbids as his sinister test subjects.
88b	10b	"Rabbid Pirates – Part 1"	Clément Savoyat	Antoine Colomb	November 17, 2018	410	N/A
Pirate Rabbids take over the sub as their pirate ship.
88c	10c	"Rabbid Pirates – Part 2"	Guillaume Rio	Antoine Colomb	November 17, 2018	410	N/A
Torx takes over the Rabbids sub.
89a	11a	"Rabbid Investigation"	Clément Savoyat	Olivier Berclaz	November 24, 2018	411	N/A
Sherlock Rabbid must investigate the case of the missing dog treats which were mysteriously eaten by an unknown suspect.
89b	11b	"Rabbid Exfiltration"	Guillaume Rio	Emmanuel Poulain-Arnaud & Armand Robin	November 24, 2018	411	N/A
A Rabbid gets kidnapped and interrogated.
89c	11c	"Rabbids in Trouble"	Guillaume Rio	Pascal David	November 24, 2018	411	N/A
Secur-X malfunctions and starts attacking the Rabbids and sends the sub into space.
90a	12a	"The Rabbid Stowaway"	Clément Savoyat	Romain Rossard & Erwan Witschger	December 5, 2018	412	N/A
A Rabbid stowaways an octopus on board the sub.
90b	12b	"Rabbid 000 vs. Captain Furious"	Guillaume Rio	Simon Raynaud & Anton Sgambato	December 5, 2018	412	N/A
Captain Furious attacks Rabbid 000 & Dark Rabbid, resulting in the duo having to work together to defeat Captain Furious.
90c	12c	"Night of the Living-Rabbids"	Clément Savoyat	Antoine Colomb	December 5, 2018	412	N/A
The Rabbids must escape from a horde of zombie Rabbids.
91a	13a	"The Great Rabbid Escape"	Guillaume Rio	Antoine Colomb	December 5, 2018	413	N/A
Zack gets kidnapped by Torx, which leads to the Rabbids trying to save him.
91b	13b	"Drive, Rabbid!"	Clément Savoyat	Philippe Riche	December 5, 2018	413	N/A
Mad Rabbid attempts to drive the sub like his own personal car.
91c	13c	"The Great Rabbid Chase"	Guillaume Rio	Sébastein Guérout	December 5, 2018	413	N/A
Secur-X accidentally gets taken out of the sub, and now must chase after the Rabbids.
92a	14a	"Captain Mad vs. The Aliens"	Clément Savoyat	Philippe Riche	December 5, 2018	414	N/A
Mad Rabbid angers a pair of aliens, resulting in them attacking the Rabbids and trying to invade Earth.
92b	14b	"Ghost-Rabbid"	Clément Savoyat	Nicolas Le Nevé	December 5, 2018	414	N/A
An opera-singing Rabbid tries to get back into the sub, only to get mistaken for a ghost.
92c	14c	"Robber Rabbid"	Guillaume Rio	Philippe Riche	December 5, 2018	414	N/A
Mad Rabbid attempts to win some games by cheating like a pro.
93a	15a	"The Bride of Bwah-Cula"	Aude Massot	Philippe Riche	December 11, 2018	415	N/A
A Rabbid falls in love with the vampire Rabbid, Bwah-Cula.
93b	15b	"Bwah-Cula's Wedding"	Aude Massot	Philippe Riche	December 11, 2018	415	N/A
During a Rabbid wedding, Bwah-Cula finally gets married.
93c	15c	"The Bowtie and the Rabbid"	Guillaume Rio	Antoine Colomb & Guillaume Rio	December 11, 2018	415	N/A
Dark Rabbid sends some Ninjas to deal with Rabbid 000.
94a	16a	"Rabbid Allergy"	Antoine Colomb	Pascal David	December 18, 2018	416	N/A
A Rabbid gains an allergy from eating a caterpillar, which caused anyone who touches him to get paralyzed.
94b	16b	"Aztec Rabbids"	Aude Massot	Philippe Riche	December 18, 2018	416	N/A
Zack gets caught by the tribal Rabbids.
94c	16c	"The Rabbid Quest"	Clément Savoyat	Pascal David	December 18, 2018	416	N/A
A group of Rabbids go on a quest.
95a	17a	"Search for the Rabbid Totem"	Guillaume Rio	Emmanuel Poulain-Arnaud & Armand Robin	December 18, 2018	417	N/A
Two Rabbids accidentally stumble upon a totem.
95b	17b	"Rabbid Mutation"	Aude Massot	Sébastein Guérout	December 18, 2018	417	N/A
After drinking an energy drink, a Rabbid becomes a terrifying mutant monster and starts causing havoc and chaos.
95c	17c	"Battle for the Rabbid Throne"	Clément Savoyat	Antoine Colomb	December 18, 2018	417	N/A
The Rabbids battle for the toilet seat.
96a	18a	"Rabb-Attack"	Guillaume Rio	Pascal David	December 18, 2018	418	N/A
A pair of aliens take over the sub.
96b	18b	"Jungle Rabbid and the Army of the Three Crabs"	Antoine Colomb	Philippe Riche	December 18, 2018	418	N/A
Jungle Rabbid must rescue the chick from the nefarious Torx.
96c	18c	"Commando Rabbid"	Antoine Colomb	Emmanuel Poulain-Arnaud & Armand Robin	December 18, 2018	418	N/A
After the President gets abducted by Rabbids, the agency sends Zack's Rabbids to save him.
97a	19a	"Rabbids vs. The Infernal Kitten"	Guillaume Rio	Emmanuel Poulain-Arnaud & Armand Robin	December 18, 2018	419	N/A
The evil Torx sends a robotic kitten to get rid of the President.
97b	19b	"The Rabbid Paradox"	Clément Savoyat	Pascal David	December 18, 2018	419	N/A
The sub gets trapped in an alternate universe.
97c	19c	"The Rabbid from the Future"	Clément Savoyat	Antoine Colomb	December 18, 2018	419	N/A
A robotic Rabbid from the future tries to wipe out a Rabbid with a blonde wig.
98a	20a	"Santa Rabbid vs. The Christmas Turkey"	Aude Massot	Philippe Riche	December 18, 2018	420	N/A
Mini Rabbid is throwing screaming fits. To shut him up, the Rabbids attempt to give him the spirit of Christmas. Later, a Rabbid organizes a Christmas dinner on the sub. Note: When Mini Rabbid gets slapped by Christmas Turkey Rabbid, this marks his first time crying.
98b	20b	"Cow and Rabbid"	Clément Savoyat	Guillaume Picard & Clément Savoyat	December 18, 2018	420	N/A
A Rabbid attempts to protect a cow from becoming a hamburger.
98c	20c	"Shark-Rabbid"	Antoine Colomb	Emmanuel Poulain-Arnaud & Armand Robin	December 18, 2018	420	N/A
Pirate Rabbids accidentally bring a shark into the sub.
99a	21a	"Garden Rabbid"	Guillaume Rio	Pascal David	December 18, 2018	421	N/A
Mad Rabbid accidentally turns the Rabbids to stone.
99b	21b	"A Sub Inside the Rabbid"	Aude Massot	Emmanuel Poulain-Arnaud & Armand Robin	December 18, 2018	421	N/A
After the sub accidentally gets shrunk, a Rabbid swallows it. Now the sub is stuck in the Rabbid's body.
99c	21c	"Rabbid Riddle"	Guillaume Rio	Pascal David	December 18, 2018	421	N/A
The agency watches footages of Zack and the Rabbids.
100a	22a	"The Rabbid Boat"	Clément Savoyat	Sébastien Guérout	December 18, 2018	422	N/A
The Rabbids transform the sub into a cruise ship to calm down an angry alien.
100b	22b	"Rabbid Kitty Business"	Aude Massot	Camille Féry	December 18, 2018	422	N/A
A group of Rabbids disguise themselves as adorable baby kittens.
100c	22c	"Rabbidus Gladiatus"	Antoine Colomb	Antoine Colomb	December 18, 2018	422	N/A
A Viking Rabbid tries to survive in Torx's evil lair.
101a	23a	"Rabbid Getaway"	Guillaume Rio	Nicolas Le Nevé	December 18, 2018	423	N/A
Zack tries to get the Rabbids away from a stark-raving mad farmer.
101b	23b	"The Attack of the Rabbid Flies"	Clément Savoyat	Sébastien Guérout	December 18, 2018	423	N/A
Mad Rabbid becomes a fly/Rabbid mutant once again, This time he turns all the Rabbids into fly/Rabbid mutants.
101c	23c	"Rabbid 000 vs. The Son of Dark Rabbid"	Aude Massot	Philippe Riche & Erwan Witschger	December 18, 2018	423	N/A
After getting jealous of Rabbid 000 getting all the credit, Mini Rabbid joins forces with Dark Rabbid.
102a	24a	"Circus Rabbid"	Antoine Colomb	Simon Raynaud & Antonin Sgambato	December 18, 2018	424	N/A
A determined Rabbid tries to join the circus.
102b	24b	"Fightin' Rabbids"	Aude Massot	Pascal David	December 18, 2018	424	N/A
A Rabbid tries to get his knife back from Mad Rabbid.
102c	24c	"The Three Rabbid-Teers"	Antoine Colomb	Sébastien Guérout	December 18, 2018	424	N/A
A Rabbid teaches two Rabbids good behavior. They later do good deeds everywhere they go. Note: Final appearance of Junior Gassman.
103a	25a	"The Castaway Rabbid – Part 1"	Guillaume Rio	Philippe Riche	December 26, 2018	425	N/A
A Rabbid gets stranded on a desert island.: The episode references Robert Zemeckis' 2000 film, Cast Away.
103b	25b	"The Castaway Rabbid – Part 2"	Guillaume Rio	Philippe Riche	December 26, 2018	425	N/A
The now-abandoned Rabbid attempts to survive on the desert island.: The episode also references Robert Zemeckis' 2000 film, Cast Away.
103c	25c	"Rabbidrooster and the Lost Chick"	Antoine Colomb	Philippe Riche	December 26, 2018	425	N/A
A Rabbid must rescue chicks from an insane farmer who wants to hurt them.
104a	26a	"Mad Rabbid and Leonardo's Astrolabe"	Clément Savoyat	Philippe Riche & Clément Savoyat	December 26, 2018	426	N/A
The Rabbids outbid Torx for an astrolabe to get to Pretzel Island.
104b	26b	"Mad Rabbid on Pretzel Island – Part 1"	Clément Savoyat	Philippe Riche	December 26, 2018	426	N/A
Mad Rabbid finally arrives at Pretzel Island where he sees Lapinbernatus again.
104c	26c	"Mad Rabbid on Pretzel Island – Part 2"	Guillaume Rio	Philippe Riche	December 26, 2018	426	N/A
Mad Rabbid tries to get back the sub from Lapinibernatus.

=== Film (2021) ===
A film titled Mission to Mars was announced in 2019, and was aired in France on 29 September 2021.

Title	Directed by	Written by	Original release date
"Rabbids Invasion: Mission to Mars"	Franz Kirchner	Howard Read and Arnaud Bouron Based on an idea by: Arnaud Bouron	September 29, 2021
Lapinibernatus (known to the humans as "Scribbles" in the special) joins Mini Rabbid and newcomers Disco and Cosmo on an expedition to Mars by their employer and co-funder of the expedition, tech giant Nebulous Industries CEO Dr. Frank Nebula from trying to terraform Mars. During the course of the adventure, they meet a race of Martians living on the planet while them and their new scientist friends try to stop Nebula from killing the Martians (that he does not want the public to know about) with nuclear bombs. Note: This film is the series finale.
