= Rabbids Go Home =

2009 video game

- PAL cover art for Wii
- Developers: Ubisoft Montpellier; Ubisoft Casablanca (Nintendo DS version)
- Publisher: Ubisoft
- Directors: Jacques Exertier; Jean-Philippe Caro
- Designer: Christophe Pic
- Composer: Fanfare Vagabontu
- Series: Rabbids
- Platforms: Wii; Nintendo DS; Microsoft Windows
- Release: Nintendo Wii, Nintendo DS: NA: November 3, 2009; AU: November 5, 2009; EU: November 6, 2009; JP: November 26, 2009; Microsoft Windows: RUS: December 12, 2009; PL: March 30, 2011
- Genres: Action-adventure, platformer, puzzle (DS version only)
- Modes: Single-player, multiplayer

Rabbids Go Home (French: The Lapins Crétins: La Grosse Aventure) is an action-adventure video game developed and published by Ubisoft for the Wii and Nintendo DS. The game was released in North America on November 3, 2009, in Australia on November 5, 2009, and in Europe on November 6, 2009. A modified, shorter version of the game was ported to Microsoft Windows and released in Russia and Poland.

Rabbids Go Home is the fourth installment in the Rabbids series of video games and takes place after the events of Rayman Raving Rabbids: TV Party (2008), and is the first title in the series without Rayman, unlike majority other games in the series, and Rabbids Go Home is not a collection of mini games, but a full-fledged platformer. The game's plot centers on the efforts of the titular Rabbids to collect as many human objects as they can and create a huge pile high enough to reach the Moon, all the while avoiding the extermination attempts by the "Verminators", who wish to gain back the stuff the Rabbids have stolen.

The game received generally positive reviews from critics, who praised the game's humor, soundtrack and accessible gameplay, though some noted the game's low difficulty. The reviews for the Nintendo DS version were mixed. The online services for the game were shut down when the Nintendo Wi-Fi Connection service was shut down in May 2014.

The game's premise would later be loosely adapted in the second season of Rabbids Invasion, which features many of the Rabbids failed attempts at reaching the Moon.

== Gameplay ==
Wii version

The player controls a team of newlyweds Rabbids on a rampage pushing a shopping cart. The goal of the game is to go to human places (including but not limited to malls, hospitals and airports) to collect as much stuff as possible during each level and help the Rabbids build a pile high enough to reach the Moon. In each level, there is enough stuff to grow the pile by 1,000 feet. The minimum requirement for completing a level is to collect the "Xtra Large Stuff" and carry it to the toilet at the end of the level. The more items the player collects, the more items are unlocked for the Rabbids (such as figurines, tattoos, tools, accessories and challenges) depending on the score. The Xtra Large Stuff is located either in the middle or end of a level. Some Xtra Large items affect the gameplay. For example, a jet engine will propel the shopping cart to three times its normal speed, while a sick patient's quarantine bed allows the cart to float and glide. Placed throughout the levels are "Collector Rabbids", with which the player can leave any stuff they have collected up to that point. The health of the Rabbids (described in-game as "ideas") is measured in light bulbs, which fry out when the Rabbids take damage and get collected to refill. At the start of the game, the Rabbids will have three light bulbs, displayed at the bottom-left corner of the screen. Later in the game, the player can earn up to 6 light bulbs. If all of the light bulbs burn out or the player falls into the void, the Rabbids will get set back to an automated checkpoint.

The player can move the shopping cart with the Nunchuk and accelerate using the A button. The Rabbids' main mode of offense is a loud vocalization called the "Bwaaaah! Attack", which can be triggered by shaking the Wii Remote. This attack can break certain objects, stun enemies like guard dogs, scare humans and strip them of their clothing. As the player advances through the game, the Verminators and robots appear, and humans will start wearing soundproof helmets to protect themselves from the "Bwaaaah! Attack". The player can perform another technique named the "Super Boost", which is initiated when the shopping cart turns and drifts to the point where blue sparks fly from under the cart's wheels. When the player presses the A button and turns, the cart will skid. When blue sparks are visible, the player may press the B button, and the "Super Boost" will be performed. This ability allows the player to knock down piles of crates, strip certain enemies faster and leap over obstacles through the use of springboards. The player can also launch the "Cannonball Rabbid", a Rabbid living inside the player's Wii Remote, by aiming with the Wii Remote and pressing the Z button on the Nunchuk attachment. This attack can strip certain enemies and open certain grates that are marked.

At several points during the game, a Rabbid is "drawn" into the Wii Remote itself and can be thrown and bounced around while "inside" the remote as the screen displays an apparent interior view of the remote.

Nintendo DS version

Unlike the console version, it is a 2D puzzle game.

== Plot ==
TV Party concluded with the Rabbids invading the world of television, which serves as a bridge to Rabbids Go Home, where the Rabbids become bored of Earth and decide to build a pile of junk to reach the moon, following their failure and previous schemes of capturing Rayman. On the outskirts of a bustling city set in Earth, a family of Rabbids hang around in a junkyard, bored of partying, and want to go home. The problem is, they don't even know where they came from. The rabbids see the moon and believe it is their home.

They gather the human objects and fit them all into the shopping cart, transfer all of the stuff they have found through the sewage system via a series of toilets and add the stuff to their growing pile, which becomes higher as the game progresses. Eventually, the humans revolt against the Rabbids and become "Verminators" in a bid to exterminate the Rabbids and retrieve their stolen stuff.

At the end of the game, the Rabbids are still not able to reach the Moon, even after gathering almost everything from the city. The humans, in a desperate attempt to get rid of the Rabbids, bombard the pile with time-delay bombs which explode on the pile, causing it to fly up into space. The humans initially celebrate, but once the XL junk falls from the sky, they start to panic as the city is left in shambles. Meanwhile, in space, the Rabbids celebrate their accomplishment of finally reaching the Moon, albeit caught in the Moon's gravitational orbit.

== Development ==
Rabbids Go Home underwent three years of development before its release during the production of the Rayman Raving Rabbids trilogy, A coherant and authentic storyline was needed to keep the Rabbids fresh and conserve their variety in the context of an adventure game. The development team evaluated the Rabbids as representing "emotions pushed to the extreme" and created the human characters to be the exact opposite: "[They] mull over all their decisions, their emotions in-check. Their organs have atrophied. They have nearly forgotten that they have a body or a heart, and can barely handle those." Jacques Exertier stated that the meeting between the two opposing characters is an allegory of the "internal debates we have with ourselves each time we make a decision" and that much of the comedic situations in the game stem from the meeting of the two archetypes. The setting of Rabbids Go Home was visually inspired by the period between 1945 and 1975, during which there was an explosion in mass consumption. The visuals were based on simple colors and geometric shapes rather than photorealism to create a caricaturized image of its "uptight humans with their sterile places and normalized urban planning". Ubisoft Montpellier created a proprietary game engine, LyN, specifically for and alongside Rabbids Go Home. The game was announced on April 9, 2009. On November 17, 2009, Ubisoft denied a rumor that the game would be recalled from United Kingdom shops due to "inappropriate language". As a result of this, the game has been re-rated a 12 in Europe.

== Music ==
The music of Rabbids Go Home was performed by Fanfare Vagabontu, a Moldovan romani brass band, and inspired by Romanian folk music. A 12-track soundtrack was made available on the iTunes Music Store on November 17, 2009. The game also includes licensed songs such as "Come Go With Me" by The Del-Vikings, "Louie Louie" by Richard Berry, "Take Me Home, Country Roads" by John Denver, "Jamaica Farewell" by Harry Belafonte, "Somebody to Love" by Jefferson Airplane, "I Told You So" by The Delfonics, "Smarty Pants" by First Choice, "Me and Mrs. Jones" by Billy Paul, "Misty Blue" by an unknown male singer, "Boogie Wonderland" by Earth, Wind, & Fire, and "Rivers of Babylon" by Boney M. The licensed music is primarily heard coming from radios and loudspeakers in various areas of the game and can be shut off (or silenced down) by destroying said loudspeakers and radios.

== Reception ==
Reception

Aggregate scores
Aggregator	Score	
Aggregator	DS	Wii
GameRankings	68.25%	80.25%
Metacritic	70%	79%

Review scores
Publication	Score	
Publication	DS	Wii
1Up.com		B
Eurogamer		8/10
Game Informer		7.5/10
GamePro		4/5
GamesMaster		86%
GameSpot		7/10
GameZone		8/10
IGN		8.5/10
Nintendo Power	7/10	7/10
Nintendo World Report		9/10
Official Nintendo Magazine	40%	83%

The Wii version of Rabbids Go Home received generally favorable reviews from critics. Pedro Hernandez of Nintendo World Report praised the game's "inventive" uses for the Wii Remote, "easy-to-get-into" gameplay, "deep" Rabbid customization modes, "great" soundtrack and "incredible" sense of humor, but noted the redundancy of the gameplay and inconsistent framerate as weak points. NGamer UK concluded that "the Rabbids can pull off a fully fledged game without Rayman's assistance. This is witty, charming and, above all, incredible fun." GamesMaster UK described the game as "witty, energetic and hugely entertaining, even if it isn't particularly smart." Matt Casamassina of IGN stated that the game was "far more inspired and ambitious" than Rayman Raving Rabbids and said that the title "at times feels like an action romp and at times a platformer on wheels, but regardless of the scenario, you'll be having fun and smiling if not laughing." Chris Scullion of Official Nintendo Magazine UK considered Rabbids Go Home to be "the funniest game on the Wii" and commented positively on the "tight" controls and "fantastic" soundtrack, but stated that the game was too easy. Aceinet of GameZone praised the game's humor and "ever-changing" gameplay, concluding with a reminder that "games are supposed to be fun and Rabbids Go Home is a fun-filled experience that shouldn't be missed regardless of the score." Aaron Koehn of GamePro pointed out that the game draws its strength from its odd tone, but added that the simplicity of the gameplay becomes tiresome. Dan Pearson of Eurogamer noted that the "constant enthusiasm" of the Rabbids can be "draining" to some and said that the game wasn't for hardcore gaming enthusiasts. Annette Gonzalez of Game Informer said that the animations were "laugh-out-loud", but some of the gameplay sequences were "repetitive". Matt Leone of 1UP.com remarked that the licensed soundtrack and customization features added enough personality to make the game worth playing. Nintendo Power concluded that while the game had "difficulty issues", it was "a definite step in the right direction for the Rabbids, and I hope to see them continue this way." Tom McShea of GameSpot commented positively on the character creator, unlockable content and cutscenes, but said that the early levels were too easy and simple and the game became repetitive.

Reviews for the Nintendo DS version were mixed. NGamer UK called the game "the best example of the genre we've seen in ages." Nintendo Power said that the game's style of puzzle is "perfect" for touch-screen control and noted that the ability to customize challenges "adds a lot of replay value to this latest exercise in Rabbid abuse." Chris Scullion of Official Nintendo Magazine UK criticized the game's "broken" physics, "universally dull" minigames and "irritating" gameplay, but noted that the cutscenes were "decent" and the level editor is "solid".
