= Rabbids Big Bang =

2013 party video game

- Developers: Ubisoft Milan; Ubisoft Paris
- Publisher: Ubisoft
- Series: Rabbids
- Platforms: iOS; Android; Microsoft Windows; Windows Phone
- Release: WW: October 17, 2013
- Genres: Puzzle, Party
- Mode: Single player

Rabbids Big Bang (French: The Lapins Crétins Big Bang) is a party video game which was developed by Ubisoft Milan in collaboration with Ubisoft Paris and published by Ubisoft on October 17, 2013 in Europe, North America and Japan for iOS and Android. This is a spin-off game of the Rabbids games franchise.

== Gameplay ==
The game features 150 levels. In this game, players control the Rabbids along with their jetpacks to fling them across space, avoiding obstacles such as cows and the gravitational forces of other planets. Players are able to customize both their Rabbid and its jetpack.

== Reception ==
Reception

Aggregate score
Aggregator	Score
Metacritic	(iOS) 62/100

Review scores
Publication	Score
TouchArcade	3/5
Pocket Gamer	4/10
GameZebo	3/5

Rabbids Big Bang received mixed or average reviews. Touch Arcade called it predictable and lacking in humor. Pocket Gamer complained about the sense of physics and a lack of personality, calling the game frustrating and forgettable. GameZebo found the game humorous but felt the gameplay was shallow and ultimately best suited for short play sessions.
