= Rayman Raving Rabbids: TV Party =

2008 video game

- European Wii cover art
- Developer: Ubisoft Paris
- Publisher: Ubisoft
- Composer: Mark Griskey
- Series: Rayman; Raving Rabbids
- Platforms: Wii, Nintendo DS
- Release: AU: November 13, 2008; EU: November 14, 2008; NA: November 18, 2008
- Genre: Party
- Modes: Single-player, multiplayer

Rayman Raving Rabbids: TV Party (French: Rayman Prod' présente: The Lapins Crétins Show, also known as Rayman Raving Rabbids 3) is a 2008 party video game developed and published by Ubisoft in 2008 and is the direct sequel to Rayman Raving Rabbids (2006) and Rayman Raving Rabbids 2 (2007). It is the third and final installment in the original Rayman Raving Rabbids trilogy.

In the game, the Rabbids take control of Rayman's TV station and monopolize their transmissions during a whole week. Each day of this week contains a different set of minigames, and some of them make use of the Wii Balance Board. All the minigames follow the TV theme, being based on films, fitness programs, gardening programs and all sorts of shows. The "ads" are present in the form of microgames which appear randomly during gameplay, lasting only a few seconds. Clearing a microgame awards a bonus to the winning player. The game allows up to 8 players in turn-based mode.

The game was met with mixed reception and was the last Rabbids game to feature Rayman until Mario + Rabbids Sparks of Hope as a downloadable content known as Rayman in the Phantom Show. It is followed by Rabbids Go Home.

== Gameplay ==
Unlike its predecessors, the game supports the Wii Balance Board. Several mini-games support use of the Balance Board, including dance and racing games – notably, the "first video game you can play with your butt".

The minigames consist of a channel system, each channel giving hold to specific minigames, in the same setting. For example, the X-TRM Sports, consist of racing on the belly of a yak down a hill, doing jumps, or a parody of MTV's Jackass that involves the player diving off an unfinished skyscraper, drawing shapes to fit through boards with holes in them. Other minigames involve a Plunger Shooting Gallery similar to the other games. But this time, the player shoots plungers at a specific clothed Rabbid that does not belong in a movie, and in the ending, the ability to shoot is disabled for the whole ending for that minigame. Also featured are various games tied to dancing, wrestling, and even a Rock Band-esque experience. The player can run over other Rabbids with a giant tractor, try to flip burgers, or possibly destroy a city as a fire-breathing Rabbid on a take of Godzilla. In the DS version of the game, the game replaced some games with new games. A change is also seen to the minigame "Prison Fake", in which the player has to find an item somewhere in the prison using the touch screen.

== Plot ==
Following the events of the second game, after the Rabbids were invading Earth, they began chasing Rayman likely due to his disguise being discovered. Rayman runs away from a group of Rabbids while lightning strikes. As Rayman reaches an abandoned house, another strike causes the Rabbids to be teleported into the TV antenna, down the wire, and get trapped in the TV. Rayman turns on the TV and suddenly, the Rabbids are merged with the TV. They transform into cartoon versions of themselves and start to appear on their own channels in their own service: Trash TV, Groove On, Shake It, The Raving Channel, Cult Movies, X-TRM Sports, Macho TV, and No Brainer Channel (only available on the final level).

During the week, Rayman unsuccessfully tries to get rid of the Rabbids, who are constantly annoying him and putting his patience to the test. First, on Monday, he tries simply pulling the plug, but this doesn't stop them from messing around with the TV. Hitting the TV with his fist and then an ice pack Tuesday night causes the screen to slowly crack throughout the game. On Wednesday, after taping the TV doesn't get rid of the Rabbids' noise control after having two consecutive sleepless nights, he throws it out of the house, only to have it given back to him by moles who also got annoyed the next day. On Friday, Rayman throws it on the toilet, but the Rabbids make use of their time by breaking the fourth wall and using a hook outside the TV to repeatedly flush the toilet. When he sees this the following day, he decides to drown them in the sink, but the whole house shakes when the Rabbids scream.

Finally, he changes the channel to watch a football game on Sunday night, but it kept getting interrupted by the Rabbids. Even though he tries to keep changing the channel, it doesn't work, and Rayman, easily influenced by their mayhem and pushed to his breaking point, breaks the TV with his shoe and frees them, undoing the effects of the TV and the Rabbids, and returning them to their original forms. He flees from his house as the Rabbids chase him again, while one Rabbid stays inside and takes up residence of the now abandoned house.

== Reception ==
Reception

Aggregate score
Aggregator	Score
Metacritic	73/100

Review scores
Publication	Score
GameSpot	6/10
GamesRadar+	4/5
GameZone	7.6/10
IGN	(WII) 7/10 (DS) 4/10
Nintendo Life	8/10
The Guardian	3/5
VideoGamer.com	7/10

Rayman Raving Rabbids: TV Party received mixed reviews. It was nominated for multiple Wii-specific awards by IGN for its 2008 video game awards, including Best Use of Sound, Best Family Game, and Best Use of the Wii Balance Board. During the 12th Annual Interactive Achievement Awards, the Academy of Interactive Arts & Sciences nominated TV Party for "Family Game of the Year".

As of January 2009, the game had sold 1.5 million copies.

== Spin-off follow-up ==
The next game is Rabbids Go Home and is the first title in the series to not include Rayman. In this game, the Rabbids became bored with invading Earth in the second game, they decide to build a pile of junk to visit the Moon.
