= Rabbids =

Multimedia franchise by Ubisoft

- Logo used since 2009
- Genre: Party
- Developers: Ubisoft Montpellier; Ubisoft Sofia; Ubisoft Paris; Ubisoft Milan; Ubisoft Casablanca; Headstrong Games; Ubisoft Barcelona; Ubisoft Chengdu
- Publisher: Ubisoft
- Creator: Michel Ancel
- Platforms: Wii; PlayStation 2; Microsoft Windows; Xbox 360; Game Boy Advance; Nintendo DS; Nintendo 3DS; Kinect; Wii U; iOS; Android; PlayStation 4; Xbox One; Nintendo Switch; Web browser; PlayStation 5; Xbox Series X/S
- First release: Rayman Raving Rabbids; November 14, 2006
- Latest release: Rabbids: Legends of the Multiverse; June 6, 2024
- Parent series: Rayman

Rabbids, also known as Raving Rabbids (French: Lapins Crétins), is a multimedia franchise developed and published by Ubisoft. It originated as a spin-off video game from the Rayman video game series, 2006's Rayman Raving Rabbids. The franchise centers on the titular characters – a species of mischievous, rabbit-like extraterrestrials that only speak gibberish or scream wildly whenever they experience adrenaline rushes. Most video games from the franchise are of the party video game genre, though other genres have been explored as well.

The Rabbids were initially introduced as antagonists in the Rayman series of games. The popularity of the characters, aided by various viral videos and media appearances, led Raving Rabbids to become its own separate franchise, dropping the Rayman name as of 2009's Rabbids Go Home. The success of the Rabbid characters led the developers to create more games in the franchise, eventually leading to the removal of Rayman from the branding entirely.

The Rabbids have gone on to appear in other expanded media, such as a TV show and a feature film in development, as well as making guest appearances in other Ubisoft games. As of June 2019, the series had sold over 20 million units worldwide. A film adaptation is in development by Lionsgate, Ubisoft Film & Television, Mandeville Films, and Stoopid Buddy Stoodios.

== Development ==
The earliest Rayman 4 trailers depicted menacing rabbit-like aliens, appearing from underground with a blank stare in various shapes and forms, smaller eyes and furry. At this point, trailers showed the game as an adventure game with fight stages, where Rayman would need to punch and kick himself through a horde of zombie-like bunnies. As the game concept evolved, from one of a central objective to minigames, a series of viral videos were created by marketing manager Adrian Lacey and animator Charles Beirnaert which became successful on YouTube. The rabbits slowly evolved into various merchandising products such as the Rabbid figures, which were much more conscious and amusing, changing from merely being enemies to fight through into more characters with various traits and quirks. Rayman creator Michel Ancel described the bunnies as "vicious, but at the same time [...] totally stupid".

In a video interview, project lead Loïc Gounon confirmed the possibility of splitting the Rayman and Rabbid series apart, mentioning that the Rabbids "managed to hit a bit more adult and a bit more older audience than the previous Raymans". By 2009's Rabbids Go Home, Rayman does not make an appearance; when asked about the omission of Rayman during an interview about Rabbids Go Home, director Jacques Exertier provided an assurance that Rayman would return for more action-adventure video games.

The music style for the franchise was created by composer Mark Griskey. Griskey worked with audio director Yoan Fanise to define the comedic style of the early games and the style was continued with the further versions of the franchise.

== Characters ==
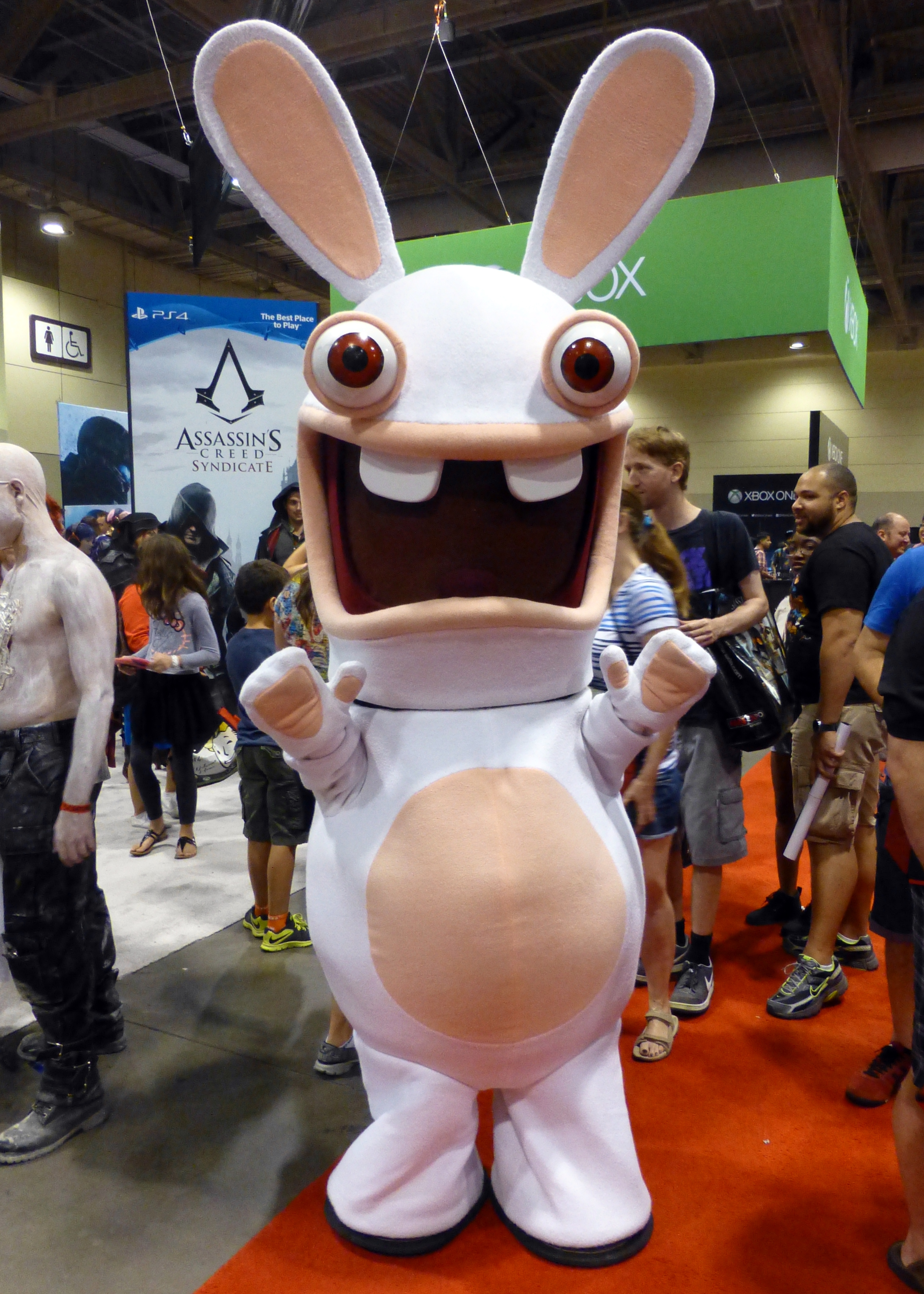
A cosplayer in a Rabbid costume

- Rabbids – Rabbids are wild hare-like extraterrestrials. They are rather limited in their intelligence, enjoying causing havoc and mischief on Rayman's world, the human world and others and can merely speak gibberish or yell out the phrase, "Bwah!", whenever they experience adrenaline rushes. Originally antagonists, due to increase in popularity, they became the protagonists in Rabbids Go Home. A pair of notable Rabbids who first appeared in Mario + Rabbids Kingdom Battle are Rabbid Mario and Rabbid Peach.
- Rayman – the main protagonist of the first three games. He always foils the Rabbids' plans. When the Rabbids became the protagonists of the franchise, Rayman was dropped, but continues to appear in his own games. He returns as a playable character in an expansion pack for Mario + Rabbids: Sparks of Hope.
- Rabbid Leader – This Rabbid is frequently depicted to be the species' leader. He is first seen in Rayman Raving Rabbids 2 but later makes appearances in Rabbids: Travel in Time and Rabbids: Alive and Kicking. He is heterochromic, with blue and red eyes. He is one of the few intelligent Rabbids featured in the series, but he can still be easily fooled. He also appears as a minor character in Rabbids Invasion, but is more of a dictator to his minions. He is the only character from the games to appear in the TV series. (The character is referred to as "Rabbid Leader" in merchandise and books.)
- Professor Barranco – A bullied Rabbid that is picked on by his peers. Normally he is seen wearing bandages on his head, in addition to a distinct black eye. He is frequently shown getting hurt through slapstick comedy. Whether it be through Rayman, his fellow rabbids attacking him, or even himself. He only appears in Rayman Raving Rabbids, though a cosmetic in Rayman Raving Rabbids 2 is based on him.
- Serguei – An antagonist in Rayman Raving Rabbids. He is a large and black Rabbid who abducted Rayman and the Globox kids and forced them to take part in a series of deadly trials. Over the course of the game, Sergeuei becomes more friendly towards Rayman until he escapes. Serguei makes no major appearances following the first game.
- Professor Albert Einequen – A scientist who only appears in Raving Rabbids: Travel in Time. He is the owner of a local museum and like any other human, he is afraid of the Rabbids. When one Rabbid first enters his museum, he encounters the professor holding a vase, who then screams and runs away, dropping various collectible clocks along the way. The Rabbid proceeds to follow him. After winning the first minigame, the professor hides in the family tree and is never seen again. Although it is still unclear, but it is possible that the professor is responsible for inventing the time washing machine as well as the golden washing machine. Einequen also appears on a trailer for Travel in Time in an 8-bit scenario, while he is explaining the various game modes of the game. It is unknown what happens to the professor after that.
- Pink – Portrayed as a creepy and robotic Rabbid that rides a spider-based mech, Pink does not speak and instead fires missiles towards the player. The manual jokingly refers to this as his only form of communication. In the early versions of Rayman Raving Rabbids, he is portrayed as a pink and fluffy rabbit, though his robotic form remains underneath. A character with a similar design to his prototype look, appears in the GBA release of the game. This design is also used for more generic enemies in the GBA version as well.

== Games ==
Release timeline
2006	Rayman Raving Rabbids
2007	Rayman Raving Rabbids 2
2008	Rayman Raving Rabbids: TV Party
2008	Rayman Origins
2009	Rabbids Go Home, Rabbids Lab
2010	Raving Rabbids: Travel in Time (WII, NA/AU/EU)
2011	Raving Rabbids: Travel in Time (WII, JP), Raving Rabbids: Travel in Time (3DS), Raving Rabbids: Alive & Kicking
2012	Rabbids Rumble, Rabbids Land (NA/PAL)
2013	Rabbids Land (JP), Rabbids Big Bang
2014	Rabbids Invasion: The Interactive TV Show
2015
2016	Rabbids Heroes
2017	Rabbids Crazy Rush, Mario + Rabbids Kingdom Battle, Virtual Rabbids: The Big Plan
2018	Mario + Rabbids: Donkey Kong Adventure
2019	Rabbids Coding
2020
2021
2022	Rabbids: Party of Legends, Mario + Rabbids Sparks of Hope
2023	Mario + Rabbids: The Tower of Doooom, Mario + Rabbids: The Last Spark Hunter, Mario + Rabbids: Rayman in the Phantom Show
2024	Rabbids: Legends of the Multiverse

Overview of Rabbids games
Year	Title	Developer(s)	Platform(s)
2006	Rayman Raving Rabbids	Ubisoft Montpellier, Ubisoft Sofia	Windows, Xbox 360, PS2, Wii
2006	Rayman Raving Rabbids	Visual Impact	GBA
2006	Rayman Raving Rabbids	Ubisoft	DS
2006	Rayman Raving Rabbids	Gameloft	J2ME
2007	Rayman Raving Rabbids 2	Ubisoft Paris	Windows, Wii
2007	Rayman Raving Rabbids 2	Ubisoft Paris	DS
2008	Rayman Raving Rabbids: TV Party	Ubisoft Paris	Wii
2008	Rayman Raving Rabbids: TV Party	Ubisoft Paris	DS
2008	Rayman Raving Rabbids: TV Party	Gameloft Argentina	J2ME
2009	Rabbids Go Home	Ubisoft Montpellier, Ubisoft Sofia	Windows, Wii
2009	Rabbids Go Home	Ubisoft	DS
2009	Rabbids Lab	Ubisoft Montpellier, Ubisoft Sofia	Wii, WiiWare
2010	Raving Rabbids: Travel in Time	Ubisoft Paris, Ubisoft Casablanca	Wii
2010	Rabbids: Travel in Time 3D	Ubisoft	3DS
2010	Rabbids Go Phone/ Again	Ubisoft	iOS
2011	Raving Rabbids: Alive & Kicking	Ubisoft Milan, Ubisoft Paris	Xbox 360
2011	Raving Rabbids: Party Collection (Feat. Rayman)	(Compilation of Rabbids, Rabbids 2 and TV Party)	Wii
2012	Rabbids Land	Ubisoft Paris	Wii U
2012	Rabbids Rumble	Headstrong Games	3DS
2012	Rabbids Invasion (Facebook Game)	Ubisoft Paris	Browser
2013	Rabbids Big Bang	Ubisoft Milan, Ubisoft Paris	iOS, Android, Windows Phone
2014	Rabbids Invasion: The Interactive TV Show	Ubisoft Barcelona	Xbox 360, Xbox One, PS4
2016	Rabbids Heroes	Ubisoft	iOS, Android
2017	Rabbids Crazy Rush	Ubisoft	iOS, Android
2017	Mario + Rabbids Kingdom Battle	Ubisoft Milan, Ubisoft Paris	Nintendo Switch
2017	Virtual Rabbids: The Big Plan	Ubisoft	Android
2018	Mario + Rabbids: Donkey Kong Adventure (DLC)	Ubisoft Milan, Ubisoft Paris	Nintendo Switch
2019	Rabbids Coding	Ubisoft	Microsoft Windows, iOS, Android
2020	Rabbids Wild Race	Ubisoft	Browser
2021	Rabbids Volcano Panic	Ubisoft	Browser
2021	Rabbids @ Versailles	Ubisoft	iOS
2022	Rabbids: Party of Legends	Ubisoft Chengdu	Windows, PS4, Xbox One, Nintendo Switch, Stadia
2022	Mario + Rabbids Sparks of Hope	Ubisoft	Nintendo Switch
2023	Mario + Rabbids: The Tower of Doooom (DLC 1)	Ubisoft	Nintendo Switch
2023	Mario + Rabbids: The Last Spark Hunter (DLC 2)	Ubisoft	Nintendo Switch
2023	Mario + Rabbids: Rayman in the Phantom Show (DLC 3)	Ubisoft	Nintendo Switch
2024	Rabbids: Legends of the Multiverse (Note: Titled as Rabbids Multiverse in the App Store.)	Ubisoft	Apple Arcade (macOS, iOS, iPadOS, tvOS, visionOS)

=== Other video games ===
The Rabbids have made several appearances in games outside of their own series or the Rayman franchise. In Red Steel, the Rabbids appear as enemies in one of the game's later stages. Chessmaster: Grandmaster Edition includes a children's chess set with Rabbids figures. The Wii version of Teenage Mutant Ninja Turtles: Smash-Up includes three different types of Rabbids as playable characters, along with a stage based on Rabbids Go Home. Toys of the Rabbids appear as hidden easter eggs in Far Cry 5, Tom Clancy's Splinter Cell: Conviction and Watch Dogs. In Assassin's Creed IV: Black Flag, a cheat can be used to turn the game's enemies into Rabbids.

The song "Here Comes the Hotstepper" in Just Dance 2 and Just Dance: Summer Party includes a Rabbid who attempts to dance with the choreographer. Another song, "Make the Party (Don't Stop)" in Just Dance 4, features a Rabbid as the DJ in the background. The alternate version of the song "Naughty Girl" in the Nintendo Switch version of Just Dance 2018 via the Just Dance Unlimited subscription service includes Rabbid Peach from Mario + Rabbids Kingdom Battle as the main choreographer.

Super Smash Bros. Ultimate features three Rabbids from Mario + Rabbids Kingdom Battle as unlockable spirits and a Rabbid Mii Fighter hat was available as downloadable content on January 28, 2020. On April Fools' Day 2019, For Honor featured a limited time event in which Rabbids replaced all of the game's characters. In 2021, they have been featured in The Crew 2 as their own Live Summit Event, as well as introducing two vanity cosmetic items into the game. The first is roof rack of a Rabbid hanging on to it and the second being a window tint full of Rabbids which can only be acquired by scoring platinum in the Live Summit. They also appeared in a Stumble Guys crossover event, which introduced six unlockable characters and a new "Rabbids Rampage" show. The rabbids also appeared in Legend of Mushroom with a crossover event that offers free appearance items and more. Before the release of POPUCOM, a trailer for the game features a collaboration/crossover with the rabbids. Making POPUCOM the third game where the rabbids had a crossover event with a video game. In December 2025, Ubisoft simultaneously released a cinematic trailer and a Roblox game called Rabbids: Takeover, a free game that is a mixture of genres like comedy, action, slapstick, and tower defense.

== In other media ==
=== TV series ===
In October 2010, Ubisoft and Aardman announced a partnership to produce a TV series pilot and several shorts based on the franchise. One year later, it was announced that a series of 7-minute computer generated animated episodes called Rabbids Invasion had been commissioned by France Televisions and that it would be produced in-house by Ubisoft Motion Pictures in France. In 2013, The series premiered on France 3 in France and Nickelodeon in the United States. In early 2012, Ubisoft Motion Pictures called on the French animation studio TeamTO to create most of the CGI parts of the series. At E3 2013, it was announced that it would be an interactive show entitled Rabbids Invasion: The Interactive TV Show for the Xbox 360, Xbox One and PlayStation 4 with a require of camera devices (Kinect and PlayStation Camera). The show aired for four seasons, with the fourth season premiering on Netflix on July 1, 2019. The show got a film/special taking place after season 4 called Rabbids Invasion: Mission To Mars, it was released onto some television channels in France on September 29, 2021, and got a worldwide release on Netflix on February 18, 2022.

=== TV Special/Film ===
On September 29, 2021, a TV special called Rabbids Invasion: Mission to Mars aired on Okoo in France. After the release of the TV special in France, it was released onto Netflix on February 18, 2022, as an original film. At the 50th International Emmy Awards, The TV Special/Film was then nominated for the International Emmy Award for Best Kids: Animation, becoming the first video game film to be nominated for an Emmy Award. Charles Hartford from “But Why Tho?” gave the film a rating of 7.5 out of 10 by saying “Rabbids Invasion: Mission to Mars delivers a tale that has an endearing core wrapped up in a furry coat of Rabbids mayhem. If you are looking for something to plop some youngsters down in front of, that will deliver some solid messages as well as cheap laughs, this movie should serve for the hour it lasts.” Brian Costello of Common Sense Media gave the film three out of five stars. Tessa Smith from "Mama's Geeky" gave the film a 2.5 (out of 5) but the review was positive, she says "Rabbids Invasion: Mission To Mars is a fun adventure for kids that teaches some important lessons through all the crazy [antics]", and "Rabbids Invasion: Mission To Mars is jam packed with the humor that we all have come to expect from the Rabbids, but there are some valuable lessons for children hidden here as well. There are great messages about accepting others for who they are, which is something we can all use a reminder of now and then". She also states that the film was predictable but nothing new by saying, "This movie is very predictable, nothing new, and nothing special, but if you are looking for something that will have the whole family laughing while the kids sneakily learn some things, Rabbids Invasion: Mission To Mars is the perfect choice".

=== Film ===
In 2014, a film based on the franchise was in the works from Columbia Pictures. The following year, Sony Pictures Animation joined in. It was supposed to aim for a late 2016 release, but the reasons are unknown for why it did not get released during that time. In late 2019, Ubisoft signed a deal with Lionsgate to produce the Rabbids film instead, with Todd Strauss-Schulson in talks to direct the film with Todd Lieberman and David Hoberman as producers along with Jason Altman and Margaret Boykin. Mandeville Film's Alex Young will be an executive producer for the film. It is being developed by Lionsgate, Ubisoft Film & Television, Mandeville Films, and Stoopid Buddy Stoodios, with Matthew Senreich, Tom Sheppard, and Zeb Wells set to write the film, while the script is revised by Todd Rosenberg. Ever since the film was shipped to Lionsgate, no updates about the film's status were released and it is now in development hell. On April 6, 2022, test footage of the film was released on Vimeo by one of the people potentially/possibly working on the film, who also posted work-in-progress (WIP) footage of the film Chip 'n Dale: Rescue Rangers, which is produced by Mandeville Films. The footage follows two Rabbids in the live-action environment going through a zany, rambunctious, and comedic process to find a glowing green remote.

=== Comic book series ===
A comic book series based on the franchise has been released in Europe, releasing in countries such as France, Belgium and Switzerland. They are drawn by the French cartoonist Romain Pujol and written by Thithaume. As of January 2025 comic book series has seventeen main-series volumes and three special editions.

=== Merchandising ===
The Rabbids have merchandising such as T-shirts, figurines, plush toys, school equipment, fan club magazines, and for a limited time, a Happy Meal toy. A Raving Rabbids themed version of the card game Jungle Speed was released in France.

=== Licensing ===
The Rabbids franchise has also been licensed for the out-of-home entertainment market such as the recent collaboration with arcade game manufacturer LAI Games to produce Virtual Rabbids: The Big Ride, an attendant-free VR attraction.

=== Amusement Center ===
In 2016, an amusement center based on the world of the Rabbids opened its doors in Montreal. The center offered an immersive and personalized experience for children, plunging them into quests combining RFID technology with physical activities. In the fall of 2018, changes were made and the center was replaced by Le Monde d'Ubisoft, which now targets people of all ages.

== Reception ==
The Rabbids series, along with its titular characters, have become very popular. IGN has stated that the Rabbids have "more personality and charisma than 10 of the most popular video game mascots combined", and that the bunnies have literally "upstaged Rayman himself".

GameSpot noted that the Rabbids themselves are "almost exclusively responsible for [selling the game's humor], as they are, without a doubt, hysterical. They're adorably designed, with their dumb stares, high-pitched shrieks, and a penchant for taking comedic bumps."

== See also ==
- Servbot, a similar type of yellow childlike henchmen in video games developed and published by Capcom.
- Minions (Despicable Me), a similar group of yellow childlike henchmen and published by Universal and Illumination.
- Grizzy & the Lemmings, the lemmings, a group of blue lemmings whose most known catchphrase is "Tabodi!"
