= Rayman Raving Rabbids 2 =

2007 video game

- European Wii box art
- Developers: Ubisoft Paris; Ubisoft Casablanca (DS)
- Publisher: Ubisoft
- Director: Nicolas Normandon; Xavier Poix
- Series: Rayman Raving Rabbids
- Engine: Jade
- Platforms: Wii; Nintendo DS; Microsoft Windows
- Release: November 13, 2007: Wii; NA: November 13, 2007; AU: November 15, 2007; EU: November 16, 2007; JP: December 6, 2007; KOR: April 26, 2008 Nintendo DS; NA: November 13, 2007; EU: November 16, 2007; AU: November 22, 2007 Microsoft Windows; RUS: June 5, 2008; POL: September 16, 2008
- Genre: Party
- Modes: Single-player, multiplayer

Rayman Raving Rabbids 2 (French: Rayman Contre les Lapins Encore + Crétins) is a 2007 party video game developed and published by Ubisoft. The sequel to Rayman Raving Rabbids (2006) and the second installment of the Raving Rabbids spin-off franchise, it was released for the Wii and Nintendo DS platforms worldwide in 2007. The game was also ported to PC exclusively in Poland and Russia, with the game being released as four parts (each on a separate disc) and some content cut, such as certain minigames, due to the absence of the Wii remote. It follows the Rabbids' attempt to invade Earth, with their headquarters set up near a local shopping mall. Players have the option to play as a Rabbid or as Rayman, who has disguised himself as a Rabbid to infiltrate their plans. This is the first Rayman game to have an E10+ rating by the ESRB, a greater emphasis on simultaneous multiplayer gameplay compared to the original game, and online leaderboards. It was followed by Rayman Raving Rabbids: TV Party in 2008.

== Gameplay ==
Minigames in Rayman Raving Rabbids 2 are played by entering a mode known as 'Trips', which is divided into five regions of the Earth: USA, Europe, Asia, South America, and Tropics. The game features 51 minigames with 9 divided upon each region, 5 of which are randomly chosen each time the player begins a trip. Completing a trip unlocks those minigames, which can later be played individually through Free Play mode. Additionally, players can use a Trip Customization mode to create their own trips using the available minigames.

Rayman Raving Rabbids 2 features a wide variety of minigames that focus on different themes and use different control schemes. In rhythm music games, players use selective instruments (singing, guitar, drum, keyboard, etc.) to perform as part of a Rabbid band. Each minigame can be played with up to four players at once, as either Rabbids or Rayman.

Shooting games, which in the first Rayman Raving Rabbids were scattered among the regular levels, have now been moved to a separate area called the Shooting Arcade, where they can be played after completion of Trips. These first-person rail shooter games utilize real footage of locations around the world with Rabbids digitally inserted. As with other games in the Raving Rabbids series, plungers serve a primary role as ammunition.

=== Character customization ===
Raving Rabbids 2 features an ability to create both custom Rayman outfits as well as custom Rabbids. These outfits are often parodies or references to famous movie, comic book or video game characters, including Indiana Jones, Spider-Man, Superman, Teenage Mutant Ninja Turtles, Sam Fisher, Ken Masters from Street Fighter, a Mantel Trooper from the PlayStation 3 game Haze, a Krusty Krew hat from the TV series SpongeBob SquarePants, Jason Voorhees from Friday the 13th, and Altair's costume from another Ubisoft game, Assassin's Creed, that is often referred by fans as "The Bunny Creed".

== Plot ==
=== Characters ===
Rayman and the Rabbids return in this game. Players take the role of Rayman in Trips mode, and have the option of playing as either Rayman or a Rabbid in Free Play mode. It is possible to unlock costumes for both Rayman and Rabbids by completing high scores in both minigames and shooting games, or by shooting a specific Rabbid in each shooting game. Occasionally, when the player beats a high score, a new Rabbid will join their party as a play-and-customizable character.

=== Story ===
Sometime after Rayman’s escape after completing all the large subterranean Rabbid Colosseum trials for 15 days in the first game, the Rabbids who have grown tired after their last scheme of capturing Rayman, decide to invade planet Earth. When a breaking news report is issued, the Rabbids begin invading the Earth in large, yellow, flying submarines. They run amok and attack an announcer woman named Jennifer Hart, broadcasting in Paris amidst the chaos (she also mentioned that the world leaders were having a conference about this). This appears to be coming from Rayman's TV, as he sets off to put a stop to the Rabbids' plans. After the Rabbids took over the planet and the humans disappeared, Rayman is seen infiltrating a mall overrun by Rabbids. As he's about to sneak in, he disguises himself wearing two socks on his head, a headband with two makeshift eyes, and inhaling helium into his lungs (in order to disguise his voice, thus blending in more with the other Rabbids). He then picks up a soda can and throws it to distract two guard Rabbids and steals one of their plungers. Rayman climbs to the roof of the facility and peers through a skylight, where he observes the Rabbids watching a montage of everyday human life (which are actually all related to some minigames in the game) to study them, planning to learn to act like humans. Seconds later, one of the males jerks its head, noticing Rayman's presence. Accidentally, he falls into the mall and is spotted. The Rabbid Leader, a Rabbid with split color eyes, walks up to him and whips out a European Wii copy of the first Raving Rabbids game. Taking a look at the cover, it seems to recognize Rayman. Thinking quickly, Rayman screams "BWAAAAAAAAH!", convincing the Rabbids that he is one of their own. Rayman and the Rabbids are then led into an airborne submarine, taking them to a location for invasion.

==== Nintendo DS story ====
The Nintendo DS version of the game features a similar storyline with a few differences. The Wii version shows how Rayman invades the Rabbids HQ in disguise, while the DS storyline explains how Rayman followed the Rabbids to Earth and learns how the Rabbids plan to act like humans. He then decides to help the humans by following the Rabbids in each area of the world (i.e., USA, Europe, Asia, etc.) by collecting information and evidence on the Rabbids antics and behavior. While remarking that the Rabbids are too stupid to understand the world and its culture, he still knows that they are a dangerous threat. He then gives the info to the humans to help prevent any more Rabbid attacks in the future at the end of story mode, which happened again.

== Development ==
=== Previews and marketing ===
The original teaser trailer is a parody of the trailer for the 2007's Transformers film. As with other games in the Raving Rabbids series, Ubisoft released a number of humorous promotional videos entitled "Around the World", featuring Rabbids in a number of locations such as Japan; France; and Leipzig, Germany. Featuring the music of Around the World by Daft Punk.

== Reception ==
Reception

Aggregate scores
Aggregator	Score
GameRankings	(Wii) 66% (DS) 50.5%
Metacritic	(Wii) 67/100

Review scores
Publication	Score
Eurogamer	5/10
Game Informer	7.75/10
GameSpot	6.5/10
GameSpy	(WII) 3.5/5 (DS) 3/5
GamesRadar+	(WII) 4/5 (DS) 3.5/5
IGN	6.3/10
Nintendo Life	8/10
Nintendo Power	7.5/10
Nintendo World Report	5.5/10
Official Nintendo Magazine	78%
VideoGamer.com	5/10
X-Play	2/5

Rayman Raving Rabbids 2 received mixed to positive reviews as well as slightly less praise in comparison to its predecessor, with a 68% GameRankings average (Rayman Raving Rabbids had a 76% GameRankings average). IGN dismissed the game as disappointing, as they felt the core games were less enjoyable than those in the first. GameSpot stated that, despite not being nearly as captivating as the first game, it also has its quality moments.

During the 11th Annual Interactive Achievement Awards, Raving Rabbids 2 received a nomination for "Family Game of the Year" by the Academy of Interactive Arts & Sciences.

== Sequel ==
A third and final sequel titled Rayman Raving Rabbids: TV Party was released in 2008 as the final installment.
