= Broken Springs =

- Directed by: Neeley Lawson
- Written by: Neeley Lawson
- Produced by: Neeley Lawson
- Starring: Teague Quillen; Travis Moody; Brandon Jenkins; Shannon Wallen
- Cinematography: Ron Loepp
- Edited by: Neeley Lawson
- Music by: Jake McMurray; Bryan Tanori; Chris Ingle
- Release date: June 4, 2010 (Dances With Films)
- Running time: 85 minutes
- Country: United States
- Language: English

Broken Springs (original title Broken Springs: Shine of the Undead Zombie Bastards, distributed under title 101 Zombies) is an independent horror film written, directed, produced, and edited by Virginia native Neeley Lawson, as his first feature effort. It stars Teague Quillen, Jake Lawson and Shannon Wallen. The movie was filmed in late fall of 2008, mainly in Gate City, Virginia, U.S. and Rogersville, Tennessee, U.S.

== Plot ==
The movie centers on three high school students whose world is turned upside down by tainted moonshine which turns everyone who drinks it into a flesh eating zombie. It does not take long for the whole town to be overrun.

== Cast ==
- Teague Quillen as Ken
- Travis Moody as Dave
- Brandon Jenkins as Brandon
- Shannon Wallen as Billy Jack
- Sean Loepp as Ron
- Jake Lawson as Flea Market Preacher
- Hunter Roberts as Cop
- Debbie Green as Ken's Mom
- Jeff Bobo as Danny
- Brent McConnell as Drunk

== Release ==
Broken Springs had its world premier on June 4, 2010 in Hollywood at the Dances With Films festival on Sunset Boulevard in Hollywood, California. The second showing was September 24, 2010 at the Chicago Horror Film Festival. Broken Springs also screened at the inaugural Anaheim International Film Festival, the Southern Appalachian International Film Festival, The Spooky Movie Film Festival (aka Washington D.C. International Horror Festival), and the Telluride Horror Show Film Festival. A teaser trailer was released on YouTube on October 26, 2009.

In 2012, the film was distributed under the title 101 Zombies and became available for rent on YouTube, Charter Cable On-Demand and Amazon.

== Soundtrack ==
The Soundtrack featured songs from The Flow of Opinion and Jake McMurray.

== Critical reception ==
Variety wrote that the film borrowed "equally from George A. Romero and Joe Dante for its wit and politics", and that "fans exhausted with big-budget zombie movies will be refreshed" by the film.

OC Weekly reviewer Matt Coker remarked, "How can one not love a film with 'undead', 'zombie”' and 'bastards' in the same title?", "barely" recommended the film, writing that as it acts as an "homage of sorts" to other low/no budget zombie films, and has "just enough humor and ironic stereotypes to make up for the poor acting, bad lighting and looooooong build up to the inevitable conclusion".
