= Rabbids Invasion =

French-American animated television series

- Original French title card
- French: Les Lapins Crétins: Invasion
- Genre: Comedy; Slapstick
- Based on: Rabbids by Ubisoft
- Developed by: Jean-Louis Momus
- Voices of: Damien Laquet; Matthew Géczy; David Coburn; David Gasman; Barbara Scaff
- Theme music composer: La Belle Equipe
- Composer: La Belle Equipe
- Countries of origin: France; United States
- Original languages: French; English
- No. of seasons: 4
- No. of episodes: 104 (309 segments + 1 special) (list of episodes)

Production
- Executive producers: Jean-Julien Baronnet (S1–3); Didier Lupfer (S1–2); Yves Guillemot (S4); Gérard Guillemot (S4)
- Producers: Frédéric Thonet; Fannie Pailloux (S1–3); Damien Leyris (S2); Ruben Berissi (S3)
- Editor: Julien Hell
- Running time: 20–21 minutes (7 minutes per segment)
- Production companies: Ubisoft Film & Television; TeamTO; Anima (Mission to Mars); France Télévisions

Original release
- Network: France 3 (France); Nickelodeon / Nicktoons (U.S., 2013–2017); Netflix (U.S., 2019)
- Release: 3 August 2013 – 26 December 2018

Rabbids Invasion (French: Les Lapins Crétins: Invasion) is an animated television series based on the Rabbids video game series by Ubisoft. It is a co-production of Ubisoft Film & Television, TeamTO, and France Télévisions. The show was developed by Jean-Louis Momus and stars Damien Laquet as the voice of the Rabbids.

The show premiered on 3 August 2013 on Nickelodeon and France 3. The first three seasons, each with 26 episodes, aired between 2013 and 2017. A fourth and final season aired in 2018 and was released worldwide through Netflix on 1 July 2019. Following the series finale, Rabbids Invasion: Mission to Mars—an hour-long TV movie serving as a follow-up—premiered in France on 29 September 2021 and was released globally as a Netflix Original on 18 February 2022.

== Plot ==
The series tells the story of the "Rabbids" — a group of mischievous, rabbit-like alien creatures that explore the human world with boundless curiosity. Because they know nothing about the rules of human society, they treat their surroundings like a vast amusement park. Wherever they go, they always cause all kinds of unpredictable chaos, destruction and commotion.

Season 1 focuses on a series of fragmented scenes, depicting the chaos that occurs when the Rabbids first come into contact with human technology, public places and everyday objects. Season 2 centres around the Rabbids' recurring, slapstick efforts to assemble scrap materials and construct spacecraft to reach the Moon. In Season 3, the Rabbids mimic various human behaviours, incorporating time travel as a recurring theme throughout. In Season 4, the Rabbids leave their junkyard home and travel to "Pretzel Island" in a flying submarine. Along the way, they make new friends and enemies: Zak and Zoe, who want to help them get home, and Otto Tox, who schemes to exploit their technology.

== Characters ==
=== Rabbids ===
- Rabbid Leader has two differently coloured eyes, including one red eye, and leads a small group of Rabbids. The character appears only in season 1.
- Professor Mad Rabbid, also known as Mad Rabbid, is depicted as a mad scientist. Several episodes focus on his inventions. He appears from season 2 onwards.
- Lapinibernatus, also known as Ancestral Rabbid, is an ancient Rabbid with a beard and hair. He is portrayed as shorter and more intelligent than modern Rabbids. He appears in several episodes of season 1 and becomes a main character in seasons 3 and 4.
- Mini Rabbid is a small Rabbid who shrinks in the wash. He is treated like a baby by the other Rabbids, and his size leaves him more vulnerable to slapstick incidents.
- Female Rabbid wears a blonde wig and is presented as feminine. She also appears in other costumes. A female Rabbid with a short black wig also appears in the series.
- CSI Rabbids are a pair of investigators, one male and one female, who wear vests. The male also wears sunglasses and a police hat and speaks in a low voice. The female speaks in falsetto. Their attempts to investigate crimes are usually unsuccessful. They first appear in season 2.
- Mafia Rabbids are three low-voiced Rabbids with facial features drawn in black marker. They are portrayed as criminals and frequently appear in Rabbid Jail.
- Rabbid 000 is a parody of James Bond and frequently fights Dark Rabbid.
- Dark Rabbid is an antagonist who first plans to destroy the Moon and later targets Rabbid 000.

=== Humans ===
- Thimothy Gluant (or Timothy Gluant) Thimothy is a spoiled boy and is prone to tantrums. He is Tina Glaunt's son. He is a background character, but becomes the main antagonist for two episodes in Season 1.
- Tina Glaunt is Thimothy Gluant's mom.
- Zak is a nervous teenager who initially saw the Rabbids as legitimate alien invaders to be hunted, but later warmed up to them, becoming a friend to the Rabbids.
- Zoe is Alice and Junior's babysitter and Zak's girlfriend. She along with Zak become friends to the Rabbids in season 4.
- John is a scientist who is studying the behaviour of the Rabbids. He and his colleague Gina struggle to figure out what the Rabbids are capable of.
- Gina is John's colleague.
- Alice Gassman is a young girl and the big sister of Junior Gassman. She has short blonde hair, blue eyes, and wears a pink shirt and dark blue pants. She befriends the Rabbids.
- Junior Gassman is the baby brother of Alice Gassman and son of Mr. Gassman and Ashton Lincoln. He is shorter than Alice. He has blonde hair, blue eyes, and wears a Rabbit outfit. Junior is prone to crying. In season 4, his voice is realistic baby sounds.
- Ashton Lincoln (or Ashton Gassman) is an enemy of the Rabbids and a frequent target of their antics. She is the ex-wife of Mr. Gassman and the mother of Alice Gassman and Junior Gassman.
- Otto Torx is the antagonist of season 4. He's an egotistical supervillain who wants the world to recognize his genius. He is eventually defeated by the Rabbids.

== Episodes ==
Season	Segments	Episodes	Originally released	
Season	Segments	Episodes	First released	Last released
1	78	26	August 3, 2013	December 6, 2014
2	78	26	October 11, 2014	June 14, 2016
3	78	26	June 21, 2016	June 23, 2017
4	76	26	September 1, 2018	December 26, 2018
Mission to Mars			September 29, 2021	

== Production ==
In October 2010, Ubisoft and Aardman announced a partnership to produce a TV series pilot and several shorts based on the Rabbids franchise. The following year, it was announced that 78 animated episodes would be made by Ubisoft's Montreuil-based studio Ubisoft Motion Pictures as its first in-house production. In the United States, the series premiered on Nickelodeon on 3 August 2013. On 17 December 2013, the series was renewed for a second season of 26 half-hour blocks, with three segments per block. On 16 June 2015, it was renewed for a third season.

A fourth and final season was announced in July 2018. This season was not aired by Nickelodeon, and it instead aired on France 3 and Netflix.

== Broadcast ==
The series aired on France 3 in France. In China, Rabbids Invasion ranked as the most-watched children's television series in 2017, having gathered over a billion views. Disney Channel Asia premiered the fourth and final season of Rabbids Invasion on 8 July 2019.

In the United States, from 3 August 2013 to 7 February 2016, the first season, and several episodes of the second season, aired on Nickelodeon. The rest of the second season and all of the third season was aired on the Nicktoons channel. The fourth season was not aired in the United States until Netflix released it in July 2019. In 2023, the series was picked up by the U.S. video-on-demand service Kabillion.

== Reception ==
Emily Ashby of Common Sense Media gave the show two out of five stars, stating: "Rabbids Invasion tones down the violence for the characters' jump from gaming to the TV, but they still have a lot of fun at the expense of each other and unsuspecting bystanders, and a lot of their antics would be frowned upon in the real world (using chickens' buttocks as egg shooters in a mock battle, for instance). Ultimately, though, it's crude and minimally taxing on viewers' sense of comprehension, so for better or worse, it's bound to appeal to the grade-school set."

The show was nominated for an International Emmy Award for Best Kids: Animation at the 50th International Emmy Awards for its TV special/film Rabbids Invasion: Mission to Mars.

== Video game ==
Rabbids Invasion was adapted into an interactive TV series titled Rabbids Invasion: The Interactive TV Show. The game combines existing television episodes with a series of challenges. It was released on Xbox 360, Xbox One, and PlayStation 4 in November 2014, requiring a Kinect or PlayStation Camera, respectively.

== See also ==
- Rayman: The Animated Series – another TV show based on the Rayman franchise
