= List of Ubisoft games: 2010–2019 =

Title	Platform(s)	Release date	Developer(s)	Ref.
Assassin's Creed II: Discovery	iOS	January 7, 2010	Griptonite	
Sleepover Party	Wii	January 12, 2010	Zöe Mode	
No More Heroes 2: Desperate Struggle	Wii	January 26, 2010	Grasshopper Manufacture	
Battle of Giants: Mutant Insects	Nintendo DS	March 2, 2010	Ubisoft Quebec	
Assassin's Creed II	Microsoft Windows	March 4, 2010	Ubisoft Montreal, Ubisoft Annecy, Ubisoft Singapore	
Silent Hunter 5: Battle of the Atlantic	Microsoft Windows	March 4, 2010	Ubisoft Bucharest, Massive Entertainment	
Racquet Sports	Wii	March 9, 2010	Asobo Studio	
Boot Camp Academy	Wii	March 11, 2010	Naps Team	
Battle of Giants: Dinosaurs - Fight for Survival	Nintendo DSi	March 15, 2010	Ubisoft Quebec	
Imagine: Gymnast	Nintendo DS	March 23, 2010	1st Playable Productions	
Red Steel 2	Wii	March 23, 2010	Ubisoft Paris	
The Settlers 7: Paths to a Kingdom	Microsoft Windows	March 25, 2010	Blue Byte, Massive Entertainment	
Tom Clancy's Splinter Cell: Conviction	Xbox 360	April 13, 2010	Ubisoft Montreal	
Castle & Co	Facebook	April 28, 2010	Ubisoft Chengdu	
OK! Puzzle Stars	Nintendo DS	April 30, 2010	Team 3 Games	
Tom Clancy's Splinter Cell: Conviction	Microsoft Windows	April 30, 2010	Ubisoft Montreal, Massive Entertainment	
Prince of Persia: The Forgotten Sands	PlayStation 3	May 18, 2010	Ubisoft Montreal, Ubisoft Singapore	
Prince of Persia: The Forgotten Sands	Xbox 360	May 18, 2010	Ubisoft Montreal, Ubisoft Singapore	
Prince of Persia: The Forgotten Sands	Wii	May 18, 2010	Ubisoft Quebec	
Voodoo Dice	PlayStation Portable	May 26, 2010	ExKee	
Voodoo Dice	Xbox 360	May 26, 2010	ExKee	
Prince of Persia	iOS	May 28, 2010	Ubisoft Quebec	
Voodoo Dice	PlayStation 3	June 8, 2010	ExKee	
Prince of Persia: The Forgotten Sands	Microsoft Windows	June 10, 2010	Ubisoft Montreal, Massive Entertainment, Ubisoft Singapore	
Dance on Broadway	Wii	June 15, 2010	Longtail Studios	
Battle of Giants: Mutant Insects - Revenge	Nintendo DSi	June 28, 2010	Ubisoft Quebec	
Voodoo Dice	iOS	June 28, 2010	ExKee	
Voodoo Dice	Microsoft Windows	July 15, 2010	ExKee	
Petz Hamsterz Family	Nintendo DSi	July 26, 2010	Ubisoft Nagoya	
Galaxy Racers	Nintendo DS	July 2010	Kunst-Stoff	
Petz: Dogz Family	Nintendo DSi	August 2, 2010	Ubisoft Nagoya	
Scott Pilgrim vs. the World: The Game	PlayStation 3	August 10, 2010	Ubisoft Chengdu, Ubisoft Montreal	
Gold's Gym Dance Workout	Wii	August 17, 2010	Land Ho!	
Scott Pilgrim vs. the World: The Game	Xbox 360	August 25, 2010	Ubisoft Chengdu, Ubisoft Montreal	
Tom Clancy's H.A.W.X 2	Xbox 360	September 3, 2010	Ubisoft Bucharest	
R.U.S.E.	Microsoft Windows	September 9, 2010	Eugen Systems, Massive Entertainment	
R.U.S.E.	PlayStation 3	September 9, 2010	Eugen Systems, Massive Entertainment	
R.U.S.E.	Xbox 360	September 9, 2010	Eugen Systems, Massive Entertainment	
Tom Clancy's H.A.W.X 2	PlayStation 3	September 10, 2010	Ubisoft Bucharest	
Racquet Sports	PlayStation 3	September 15, 2010	Asobo Studio	
Arthur and the Revenge of Maltazard	Microsoft Windows	September 24, 2010	Phoenix Studio	
Arthur and the Revenge of Maltazard	PlayStation 3	September 24, 2010	Phoenix Studio	
Arthur and the Revenge of Maltazard	Wii	September 24, 2010	Phoenix Studio	
Shaun White Skateboarding	Microsoft Windows	October 1, 2010	Ubisoft Montreal	
The Hollywood Squares	Wii	October 5, 2010	Ludia	
Just Dance 2	Wii	October 12, 2010	Ubisoft Paris	
Puzzler World 2011	Nintendo DS	October 15, 2010	Team 3 Games	
The Settlers Online	Browser	October 22, 2010	Blue Byte	
Shaun White Skateboarding	PlayStation 3	October 24, 2010	Ubisoft Montreal	
Shaun White Skateboarding	Wii	October 24, 2010	Ubisoft Montreal	
Shaun White Skateboarding	Xbox 360	October 24, 2010	Ubisoft Montreal	
CSI: Fatal Conspiracy	Microsoft Windows	October 28, 2010	Telltale Games	
CSI: Fatal Conspiracy	PlayStation 3	October 28, 2010	Telltale Games	
CSI: Fatal Conspiracy	Wii	October 28, 2010	Telltale Games	
CSI: Fatal Conspiracy	Xbox 360	October 28, 2010	Telltale Games	
Bloody Good Time	Microsoft Windows	October 29, 2010	Outerlight, Haiku Interactive, Ubisoft Pune	
Bloody Good Time	Xbox 360	October 29, 2010	Outerlight, Haiku Interactive, Ubisoft Pune	
Fighters Uncaged	Xbox 360	November 4, 2010	Ama Studios	
Just Dance Kids	Wii	November 9, 2010	Land Ho!	
Family Feud: Decades	Wii	November 10, 2010	Ludia	
MotionSports	Xbox 360	November 10, 2010	Ubisoft Milan	
My Chinese Coach	iOS	November 11, 2010	Sensory Sweep Studios, Ubisoft Chengdu	
Tom Clancy's H.A.W.X 2	Microsoft Windows	November 12, 2010	Ubisoft Bucharest	
Tom Clancy's H.A.W.X 2	Wii	November 12, 2010	Ubisoft Bucharest	
Assassin's Creed: Brotherhood	PlayStation 3	November 16, 2010	Ubisoft Montreal, Ubisoft Annecy, Ubisoft Bucharest, Ubisoft Quebec, Ubisoft Shanghai	
Assassin's Creed: Brotherhood	Xbox 360	November 16, 2010	Ubisoft Montreal, Ubisoft Annecy, Ubisoft Bucharest, Ubisoft Quebec, Ubisoft Shanghai	
Tom Clancy's Ghost Recon	Wii	November 16, 2010	Next Level Games	
Tom Clancy's Ghost Recon Predator	PlayStation Portable	November 16, 2010	Virtuos	
Raving Rabbids: Travel in Time	Wii	November 21, 2010	Ubisoft Paris	
CSI: Unsolved!	Nintendo DS	November 23, 2010	Other Ocean Interactive	
Michael Jackson: The Experience	Wii	November 23, 2010	Ubisoft Montpellier, Ubisoft Milan, Ubisoft Paris	
Michael Jackson: The Experience	Nintendo DS	November 23, 2010	Ubisoft Sao Paulo	
Michael Jackson: The Experience	PlayStation Portable	November 23, 2010	Ubisoft Sao Paulo	
Sports Collection: 15 Sports to Master	Nintendo DS	December 2, 2010	Ubisoft Pune	
The Hollywood Squares	iOS	December 13, 2010	Ludia	
Prince of Persia: The Sands of Time HD	PlayStation 3	December 15, 2010	Ubisoft Bucharest	
Prince of Persia: The Two Thrones HD	PlayStation 3	December 15, 2010	Ubisoft Bucharest	
Prince of Persia: Warrior Within HD	PlayStation 3	December 15, 2010	Ubisoft Montreal	
Petz: Catz Family	Nintendo DSi	January 10, 2011	Phoenix Studio	
Zeit²	Microsoft Windows	January 12, 2011	Brightside Games	
Zeit²	Xbox 360	January 12, 2011	Brightside Games	
Beyond Good & Evil HD	Xbox 360	March 2, 2011	Ubisoft Shanghai	
The $1,000,000 Pyramid	Wii	March 8, 2011	Ludia	
We Dare	PlayStation 3	March 14, 2011	Ubisoft Milan	
We Dare	Wii	March 14, 2011	Ubisoft Milan	
Fit in Six	PlayStation 3	March 15, 2011	Blue Byte	
Fit in Six	Wii	March 15, 2011	Blue Byte	
Dance on Broadway	PlayStation 3	March 17, 2011	Longtail Studios, AiLive	
Assassin's Creed: Brotherhood	Microsoft Windows	March 22, 2011	Ubisoft Bucharest, Ubisoft Montreal	
Rayman 3D	Nintendo 3DS	March 22, 2011	Ubisoft Casablanca	
Family Feud: Decades	Microsoft Windows	March 25, 2011	Ludia	
Asphalt 3D	Nintendo 3DS	March 27, 2011	Gameloft Montreal	
Combat of Giants: Dinosaurs 3D	Nintendo 3DS	March 27, 2011	Ubisoft Quebec	
Tom Clancy's Ghost Recon: Shadow Wars	Nintendo 3DS	March 27, 2011	Ubisoft Sofia	
IL-2 Sturmovik: Cliffs of Dover	Microsoft Windows	March 30, 2011	1C:Maddox Games	
Rabbids: Travel in Time 3D	Nintendo 3DS	April 10, 2011	Ubisoft Casablanca	
Tom Clancy's Splinter Cell 3D	Nintendo 3DS	April 10, 2011	Gameloft	
Might & Magic: Clash of Heroes	PlayStation 3	April 12, 2011	Capybara Games	
Might & Magic: Clash of Heroes	Xbox 360	April 12, 2011	Capybara Games	
Michael Jackson: The Experience	PlayStation 3	April 12, 2011	Ubisoft Montpellier, Ubisoft Milan, Ubisoft Paris	
Michael Jackson: The Experience	Xbox 360	April 12, 2011	Ubisoft Montreal	
The $1,000,000 Pyramid	iOS	April 20, 2011	Ludia	
Child of Eden	Xbox 360	June 14, 2011	Q Entertainment, MatchLock Corporation	
Cubic Ninja	Nintendo 3DS	June 14, 2011	AQ Interactive	
Outland	PlayStation 3	June 14, 2011	Housemarque	
Outland	Xbox 360	June 14, 2011	Housemarque	
Petz Fantasy 3D	Nintendo 3DS	June 21, 2011	Ubisoft Casablanca	
Beyond Good & Evil HD	PlayStation 3	June 28, 2011	Ubisoft Shanghai	
Call of Juarez: The Cartel	PlayStation 3	July 19, 2011	Techland	
Call of Juarez: The Cartel	Xbox 360	July 19, 2011	Techland	
Just Dance: Summer Party	Wii	July 19, 2011	Ubisoft Paris	
The Smurfs	Nintendo DS	July 19, 2011	Ubisoft Osaka	
The Smurfs Dance Party	Wii	July 19, 2011	Land Ho!	
From Dust	Xbox 360	July 27, 2011	Ubisoft Montpellier, Ubisoft Bucharest	
The Smurfs & Co	Facebook	July 29, 2011	Ubisoft Chengdu	
Tom Clancy's Splinter Cell Classic Trilogy HD	PlayStation 3	August 2, 2011	Ubisoft Pune	
From Dust	Microsoft Windows	August 17, 2011	Ubisoft Kyiv	
Driver: Renegade	Nintendo 3DS	August 30, 2011	VD-dev	
Driver: San Francisco	PlayStation 3	September 6, 2011	Ubisoft Reflections, Ubisoft Annecy, Ubisoft Bucharest, Ubisoft Montreal, Ubisoft Vancouver	
Driver: San Francisco	Xbox 360	September 6, 2011	Ubisoft Reflections, Ubisoft Annecy, Ubisoft Bucharest, Ubisoft Montreal, Ubisoft Vancouver	
Call of Juarez: The Cartel	Microsoft Windows	September 13, 2011	Techland	
From Dust	PlayStation 3	September 13, 2011	Ubisoft Montpellier, Ubisoft Bucharest	
Puzzler Mind Gym 3D	Nintendo 3DS	September 13, 2011	Ideas Pad	
TrackMania 2: Canyon	Microsoft Windows	September 14, 2011	Nadeo	
Might & Magic: Clash of Heroes	Microsoft Windows	September 22, 2011	Capybara Games, DrinkBox Studios	
Child of Eden	PlayStation 3	September 27, 2011	Q Entertainment, MatchLock Corporation	
Driver: San Francisco	Microsoft Windows	September 27, 2011	Ubisoft Kyiv	
Just Dance 3	Wii	October 7, 2011	Ubisoft Paris	
Just Dance 3	Xbox 360	October 7, 2011	Ubisoft Montreal	
Battle of Giants: Dinosaurs Strike	Wii	October 9, 2011	Ubisoft Quebec	
Might & Magic Heroes VI	Microsoft Windows	October 13, 2011	Black Hole Entertainment, Limbic Entertainment	
Family Feud: 2012 Edition	Wii	October 18, 2011	Ludia	
Family Feud: 2012 Edition	Xbox 360	October 18, 2011	Ludia	
PowerUp Heroes	Xbox 360	October 18, 2011	Longtail Studios	
The Price is Right: Decades	Wii	October 18, 2011	Ludia	
The Adventures of Tintin: The Secret of the Unicorn	Microsoft Windows	October 21, 2011	Ubisoft Montpellier, Ubisoft Bucharest	
The Adventures of Tintin: The Secret of the Unicorn	Nintendo 3DS	October 21, 2011	Ubisoft Barcelona	
The Adventures of Tintin: The Secret of the Unicorn	PlayStation 3	October 21, 2011	Ubisoft Montpellier, Ubisoft Bucharest	
The Adventures of Tintin: The Secret of the Unicorn	Wii	October 21, 2011	Ubisoft Montpellier, Ubisoft Bucharest	
The Adventures of Tintin: The Secret of the Unicorn	Xbox 360	October 21, 2011	Ubisoft Montpellier, Ubisoft Bucharest	
Imagine: Babyz	Nintendo 3DS	October 23, 2011	Visual Impact	
Just Dance Kids 2	Wii	October 25, 2011	Land Ho!	
Just Dance Kids 2	PlayStation 3	October 25, 2011	Land Ho!	
Just Dance Kids 2	Xbox 360	October 25, 2011	Land Ho!	
Zoo Mania 3D	Nintendo 3DS	October 25, 2011	AQ Interactive, Marvelous Entertainment	
James Noir's Hollywood Crimes	Nintendo 3DS	November 1, 2011	Ubisoft Montreal	
MotionSports Adrenaline	Xbox 360	November 1, 2011	Ubisoft Vancouver	
MotionSports Adrenaline	PlayStation 3	November 1, 2011	Ubisoft Vancouver	
NCIS	Microsoft Windows	November 1, 2011	Ubisoft Shanghai	
NCIS	PlayStation 3	November 1, 2011	Ubisoft Shanghai	
NCIS	Wii	November 1, 2011	Ubisoft Shanghai	
NCIS	Xbox 360	November 1, 2011	Ubisoft Shanghai	
Raving Rabbids: Alive & Kicking	Xbox 360	November 4, 2011	Ubisoft Casablanca	
Michael Jackson: The Experience 3D	Nintendo 3DS	November 8, 2011	Ubisoft Shanghai	
Puppies 3D	Nintendo 3DS	November 8, 2011	MTO	
The Black Eyed Peas Experience	Wii	November 8, 2011	Ubisoft Quebec	
The Black Eyed Peas Experience	Xbox 360	November 8, 2011	Inis Corporation	
Self-Defense Training Camp	Xbox 360	November 8, 2011	Ama Studios	
Your Shape: Fitness Evolved 2012	Xbox 360	November 10, 2011	Ubisoft Montreal	
ABBA: You Can Dance	Wii	November 15, 2011	Ubisoft Paris, Ubisoft Bucharest, Ubisoft Pune	
Assassin's Creed: Revelations	PlayStation 3	November 15, 2011	Ubisoft Montreal, Massive Entertainment, Ubisoft Annecy, Ubisoft Bucharest, Ubisoft Quebec, Ubisoft Singapore	
Assassin's Creed: Revelations	Xbox 360	November 15, 2011	Ubisoft Montreal, Massive Entertainment, Ubisoft Annecy, Ubisoft Bucharest, Ubisoft Quebec, Ubisoft Singapore	
Imagine: Fashion Designer	Nintendo 3DS	November 15, 2011	Virtual Toys	
Rayman Origins	PlayStation 3	November 15, 2011	Ubisoft Montpellier, Ubisoft Paris, Ubisoft Casablanca	
Rayman Origins	Wii	November 15, 2011	Ubisoft Montpellier, Ubisoft Paris, Ubisoft Casablanca	
Rayman Origins	Xbox 360	November 15, 2011	Ubisoft Montpellier, Ubisoft Paris, Ubisoft Casablanca	
The Price is Right: Decades	Xbox 360	November 15, 2011	Virtuos	
Anno 2070	Microsoft Windows	November 17, 2011	Related Designs, Blue Byte	
Assassin's Creed: Revelations	Microsoft Windows	November 29, 2011	Ubisoft Kyiv, Ubisoft Bucharest	
Just Dance 3	PlayStation 3	December 6, 2011	Ubisoft Reflections	
Puzzler World 2012	Nintendo DS	December 16, 2011	Team 3 Games	
Prince of Persia Classic	iOS	December 19, 2011	Ubisoft Pune	
Tom Clancy's Splinter Cell HD	PlayStation 3	December 27, 2011	Ubisoft Shanghai, Ubisoft Annecy	
Tom Clancy's Splinter Cell: Chaos Theory HD	PlayStation 3	December 27, 2011	Ubisoft Shanghai, Ubisoft Annecy	
Tom Clancy's Splinter Cell: Pandora Tomorrow HD	PlayStation 3	December 27, 2011	Ubisoft Shanghai, Ubisoft Annecy	
Asphalt: Injection	PlayStation Vita	February 14, 2012	Gameloft Bucharest	
Dungeon Hunter: Alliance	PlayStation Vita	February 14, 2012	Gameloft Montreal	
Lumines: Electronic Symphony	PlayStation Vita	February 14, 2012	Q Entertainment	
Rayman Origins	PlayStation Vita	February 14, 2012	Ubisoft Montpellier, Ubisoft Paris, Ubisoft Casablanca	
Tom Clancy's Splinter Cell: Conviction	Mac OS	February 29, 2012	Ubisoft Montreal	
I Am Alive	Xbox 360	March 7, 2012	Ubisoft Shanghai	
Assassin's Creed: Recollection	iOS	March 8, 2012	Ubisoft Montreal	
Shoot Many Robots	PlayStation 3	March 13, 2012	Demiurge Studios	
Shoot Many Robots	Xbox 360	March 13, 2012	Demiurge Studios	
MotoHeroz	iOS	March 14, 2012	RedLynx, Ubisoft Pune	
Rayman 3 HD	PlayStation 3	March 21, 2012	Ubisoft Shanghai	
Rayman 3 HD	Xbox 360	March 21, 2012	Ubisoft Shanghai	
Funky Barn 3D	Nintendo 3DS	March 27, 2012	Tantalus Media	
Horses 3D	Nintendo 3DS	March 27, 2012	Neko Entertainment	
Just Dance: Best Of	Wii	March 29, 2012	Ubisoft Paris	
Rayman Origins	Microsoft Windows	March 29, 2012	Ubisoft Kyiv	
I Am Alive	PlayStation 3	April 3, 2012	Ubisoft Shanghai	
Shoot Many Robots	Microsoft Windows	April 6, 2012	Demiurge Studios	
Trials Evolution	Xbox 360	April 18, 2012	RedLynx	
Tom Clancy's Ghost Recon: Future Soldier	PlayStation 3	May 22, 2012	Ubisoft Paris, Red Storm Entertainment, Ubisoft Annecy, Ubisoft Bucharest, Ubisoft Montpellier, Ubisoft Singapore	
Tom Clancy's Ghost Recon: Future Soldier	Xbox 360	May 22, 2012	Ubisoft Paris, Red Storm Entertainment, Ubisoft Annecy, Ubisoft Bucharest, Ubisoft Montpellier, Ubisoft Singapore	
Mad Riders	Microsoft Windows	May 30, 2012	Techland	
Mad Riders	PlayStation 3	May 30, 2012	Techland	
Mad Riders	Xbox 360	May 30, 2012	Techland	
Babel Rising	PlayStation 3	June 11, 2012	Mando Productions	
Babel Rising 3D	Android	June 13, 2012	Mando Productions	
Babel Rising 3D	iOS	June 13, 2012	Mando Productions	
Babel Rising	Xbox 360	June 13, 2012	Mando Productions	
James Noir's Hollywood Crimes	iOS	June 20, 2012	Ubisoft Montreal	
Just Dance: Greatest Hits	Xbox 360	June 21, 2012	Ubisoft Paris	
Tom Clancy's Ghost Recon: Future Soldier	Microsoft Windows	June 26, 2012	Ubisoft Kyiv	
The Expendables 2: Videogame	PlayStation 3	July 24, 2012	ZootFly	
Babel Rising	Mac OS	August 7, 2012	Mando Productions	
Babel Rising	Microsoft Windows	August 7, 2012	Mando Productions	
The Expendables 2: Videogame	Xbox 360	August 17, 2012	ZootFly	
The Expendables 2: Videogame	Microsoft Windows	August 20, 2012	ZootFly	
I Am Alive	Microsoft Windows	September 6, 2012	Ubisoft Shanghai	
Might & Magic: Duel of Champions	Microsoft Windows	September 13, 2012	Ubisoft Quebec	
Prince of Persia Classic	Android	September 13, 2012	Ubisoft Pune	
NCIS 3D	Nintendo 3DS	September 18, 2012	Ubisoft Osaka	
Rayman Jungle Run	iOS	September 18, 2012	DotEmu	
Puzzler World 2012	Nintendo 3DS	September 25, 2012	Team 3 Games	
Rayman Jungle Run	Android	September 28, 2012	DotEmu	
Babel Rising 3D	Windows Phone	October 1, 2012	Mando Productions	
Just Dance 4	PlayStation 3	October 9, 2012	Ubisoft Milan, Ubisoft Bucharest, Ubisoft Paris, Ubisoft Pune, Ubisoft Reflections	
Just Dance 4	Wii	October 9, 2012	Ubisoft Milan, Ubisoft Bucharest, Ubisoft Paris, Ubisoft Pune, Ubisoft Reflections	
Just Dance 4	Xbox 360	October 9, 2012	Ubisoft Milan, Ubisoft Bucharest, Ubisoft Paris, Ubisoft Pune, Ubisoft Reflections	
Monster 4x4 3D	Nintendo 3DS	October 9, 2012	Ubisoft Pune	
Rocksmith	Microsoft Windows	October 16, 2012	Ubisoft San Francisco, Ubisoft Shanghai	
Rocksmith	PlayStation 3	October 16, 2012	Ubisoft San Francisco, Ubisoft Shanghai	
Rocksmith	Xbox 360	October 16, 2012	Ubisoft San Francisco, Ubisoft Shanghai	
Just Dance: Disney Party	Wii	October 23, 2012	Land Ho!	
Just Dance: Disney Party	Xbox 360	October 23, 2012	Land Ho!	
Imagine: Fashion Life	Nintendo 3DS	October 23, 2012	Ubisoft Sofia	
Assassin's Creed III	PlayStation 3	October 30, 2012	Ubisoft Montreal, Ubisoft Annecy, Ubisoft Bucharest, Ubisoft Quebec, Ubisoft Shanghai, Ubisoft Singapore	
Assassin's Creed III	Xbox 360	October 30, 2012	Ubisoft Montreal, Ubisoft Annecy, Ubisoft Bucharest, Ubisoft Quebec, Ubisoft Shanghai, Ubisoft Singapore	
Assassin's Creed III: Liberation	PlayStation Vita	October 30, 2012	Ubisoft Sofia	
The Avengers: Battle for Earth	Xbox 360	October 30, 2012	Ubisoft Quebec	
Nutty Fluffies Rollercoaster	iOS	October 31, 2012	RedLynx	
Poptropica Adventures	Nintendo DS	November 6, 2012	Other Ocean Interactive	
Rayman Origins	Nintendo 3DS	November 6, 2012	Ubisoft Montpellier, Ubisoft Paris, Ubisoft Casablanca	
Assassin's Creed III	Wii U	November 18, 2012	Ubisoft Montreal, Ubisoft Annecy, Ubisoft Bucharest, Ubisoft Quebec, Ubisoft Shanghai, Ubisoft Singapore	
Rabbids Rumble	Nintendo 3DS	November 13, 2012	Headstrong Games	
The Hip Hop Dance Experience	Wii	November 13, 2012	Inis Corporation, Land Ho!	
The Hip Hop Dance Experience	Xbox 360	November 13, 2012	Inis Corporation	
ESPN Sports Connection	Wii U	November 18, 2012	Longtail Studios	
Just Dance 4	Wii U	November 18, 2012	Ubisoft Milan, Ubisoft Bucharest, Ubisoft Paris, Ubisoft Pune, Ubisoft Reflections	
Rabbids Land	Wii U	November 18, 2012	Ubisoft Paris	
Your Shape: Fitness Evolved 2013	Wii U	November 18, 2012	Blue Byte	
ZombiU	Wii U	November 18, 2012	Ubisoft Montpellier, Ubisoft Bucharest	
Assassin's Creed III	Microsoft Windows	November 20, 2012	Ubisoft Kyiv, Ubisoft Bucharest	
Far Cry 3	Microsoft Windows	December 4, 2012	Ubisoft Montreal, Massive Entertainment, Red Storm Entertainment, Ubisoft Shanghai	
Far Cry 3	PlayStation 3	December 4, 2012	Ubisoft Montreal, Massive Entertainment, Red Storm Entertainment, Ubisoft Shanghai	
Far Cry 3	Xbox 360	December 4, 2012	Ubisoft Montreal, Massive Entertainment, Red Storm Entertainment, Ubisoft Shanghai	
The Avengers: Battle for Earth	Wii U	December 4, 2012	Ubisoft Quebec	
Might & Magic: Duel of Champions	iOS	December 20, 2012	Ubisoft Quebec	
Racquet Sports	PlayStation 3	January 22, 2013	Asobo Studio	
Nutty Fluffies Rollercoaster	Android	February 26, 2013	Ubisoft Pune	
TrackMania 2: Stadium	Microsoft Windows	February 27, 2013	Nadeo	
Trials Evolution: Gold Edition	Microsoft Windows	March 21, 2013	Ubisoft Shanghai	
ShootMania Storm	Microsoft Windows	April 10, 2013	Nadeo	
Far Cry 3: Blood Dragon	Microsoft Windows	May 1, 2013	Ubisoft Montreal, Ubisoft Shanghai	
Far Cry 3: Blood Dragon	PlayStation 3	May 1, 2013	Ubisoft Montreal, Ubisoft Shanghai	
Far Cry 3: Blood Dragon	Xbox 360	May 1, 2013	Ubisoft Montreal, Ubisoft Shanghai	
Call of Juarez: Gunslinger	Microsoft Windows	May 21, 2013	Techland	
Call of Juarez: Gunslinger	PlayStation 3	May 21, 2013	Techland	
Call of Juarez: Gunslinger	Xbox 360	May 21, 2013	Techland	
Rayman Jungle Run	Windows Phone	May 29, 2013	DotEmu	
Splinter Cell: Blacklist - Spider-Bot	iOS	June 10, 2013	Soap Mobile Games Studio	
The Smurfs 2	PlayStation 3	June 23, 2013	WayForward	
The Smurfs 2	Wii U	June 23, 2013	WayForward	
The Smurfs 2	Xbox 360	June 23, 2013	WayForward	
Might & Magic: Clash of Heroes	Android	June 24, 2013	Capybara Games	
Might & Magic: Clash of Heroes	iOS	June 24, 2013	Tag Games	
Spartacus Legends	PlayStation 3	June 25, 2013	Kung Fu Factory	
Spartacus Legends	Xbox 360	June 25, 2013	Kung Fu Factory	
The Smurfs & Co: Spellbound	Facebook	July 3, 2013	Ubisoft Chengdu	
TrackMania 2: Valley	Microsoft Windows	July 4, 2013	Nadeo	
The Smurfs 2	Nintendo DS	July 23, 2013	Ubisoft Osaka	
The Smurfs 2	Wii	July 23, 2013	WayForward	
Prince of Persia: The Shadow and the Flame	Android	July 24, 2013	Ubisoft Pune	
Prince of Persia: The Shadow and the Flame	iOS	July 24, 2013	Ubisoft Pune	
Cloudberry Kingdom	Microsoft Windows	August 2, 2013	Pwnee Studios	
Cloudberry Kingdom	PlayStation 3	August 2, 2013	Pwnee Studios	
Cloudberry Kingdom	Wii U	August 2, 2013	Pwnee Studios	
Cloudberry Kingdom	Xbox 360	August 2, 2013	Pwnee Studios	
Splinter Cell: Blacklist - Spider-Bot	Android	August 20, 2013	Soap Mobile Games Studio	
Tom Clancy's Splinter Cell: Blacklist	Microsoft Windows	August 20, 2013	Ubisoft Toronto, Red Storm Entertainment, Ubisoft Montreal, Ubisoft Shanghai	
Tom Clancy's Splinter Cell: Blacklist	PlayStation 3	August 20, 2013	Ubisoft Toronto, Red Storm Entertainment, Ubisoft Montreal, Ubisoft Shanghai	
Tom Clancy's Splinter Cell: Blacklist	Wii U	August 20, 2013	Ubisoft Toronto, Red Storm Entertainment, Ubisoft Montreal, Ubisoft Shanghai	
Tom Clancy's Splinter Cell: Blacklist	Xbox 360	August 20, 2013	Ubisoft Toronto, Red Storm Entertainment, Ubisoft Montreal, Ubisoft Shanghai	
Rayman Legends	Microsoft Windows	September 3, 2013	Ubisoft Montpellier, Ubisoft Casablanca	
Rayman Legends	PlayStation 3	September 3, 2013	Ubisoft Montpellier, Ubisoft Casablanca	
Rayman Legends	PlayStation Vita	September 3, 2013	Ubisoft Montpellier, Ubisoft Casablanca	
Rayman Legends	Wii U	September 3, 2013	Ubisoft Montpellier, Ubisoft Casablanca	
Rayman Legends	Xbox 360	September 3, 2013	Ubisoft Montpellier, Ubisoft Casablanca	
Panzer General Online	Microsoft Windows	September 13, 2013	Funatics, Blue Byte	
Anno Online	Microsoft Windows	September 26, 2013	Blue Byte	
Flashback	Microsoft Windows	October 1, 2013	VectorCell, Ubisoft Chengdu	
Flashback	PlayStation 3	October 1, 2013	VectorCell, Ubisoft Chengdu	
Flashback	Xbox 360	October 1, 2013	VectorCell, Ubisoft Chengdu	
Just Dance 2014	PlayStation 3	October 8, 2013	Ubisoft Paris, Ubisoft Bucharest, Ubisoft Milan, Ubisoft Montpellier, Ubisoft Pune, Ubisoft Reflections	
Just Dance 2014	Wii	October 8, 2013	Ubisoft Paris, Ubisoft Bucharest, Ubisoft Milan, Ubisoft Montpellier, Ubisoft Pune, Ubisoft Reflections	
Just Dance 2014	Wii U	October 8, 2013	Ubisoft Paris, Ubisoft Bucharest, Ubisoft Milan, Ubisoft Montpellier, Ubisoft Pune, Ubisoft Reflections	
Just Dance 2014	Xbox 360	October 8, 2013	Ubisoft Paris, Ubisoft Bucharest, Ubisoft Milan, Ubisoft Montpellier, Ubisoft Pune, Ubisoft Reflections	
Rabbids Big Bang	Android	October 17, 2013	Ubisoft Paris, RedLynx, Traplight, Ubisoft Pune	
Rabbids Big Bang	iOS	October 17, 2013	Ubisoft Paris, RedLynx, Traplight, Ubisoft Pune	
Just Dance Kids 2014	Wii	October 22, 2013	Ubisoft Osaka	
Just Dance Kids 2014	Wii U	October 22, 2013	Ubisoft Osaka	
Just Dance Kids 2014	Xbox 360	October 22, 2013	Ubisoft Osaka	
Rocksmith: All-new 2014 Edition	Mac OS	October 22, 2013	Ubisoft San Francisco, Red Storm Entertainment, Longtail Studios	
Rocksmith: All-new 2014 Edition	Microsoft Windows	October 22, 2013	Ubisoft San Francisco, Red Storm Entertainment, Longtail Studios	
Rocksmith: All-new 2014 Edition	PlayStation 3	October 22, 2013	Ubisoft San Francisco, Red Storm Entertainment, Longtail Studios	
Rocksmith: All-new 2014 Edition	Xbox 360	October 22, 2013	Ubisoft San Francisco, Red Storm Entertainment, Longtail Studios	
Assassin's Creed IV: Black Flag	PlayStation 3	October 29, 2013	Ubisoft Montreal, Ubisoft Annecy, Ubisoft Bucharest, Ubisoft Chengdu, Ubisoft Milan, Ubisoft Montpellier, Ubisoft Quebec, Ubisoft Shanghai, Ubisoft Singapore, Ubisoft Sofia	
Assassin's Creed IV: Black Flag	Xbox 360	October 29, 2013	Ubisoft Montreal, Ubisoft Annecy, Ubisoft Bucharest, Ubisoft Chengdu, Ubisoft Milan, Ubisoft Montpellier, Ubisoft Quebec, Ubisoft Shanghai, Ubisoft Singapore, Ubisoft Sofia	
Rocksmith: All-new 2014 Edition	PlayStation 4	November 4, 2013	Ubisoft San Francisco, Red Storm Entertainment, Longtail Studios	
Rocksmith: All-new 2014 Edition	Xbox One	November 4, 2013	Ubisoft San Francisco, Red Storm Entertainment, Longtail Studios	
Rayman Fiesta Run	Android	November 7, 2013	Ubisoft Casablanca, Ubisoft Montpellier	
Rayman Fiesta Run	iOS	November 7, 2013	Ubisoft Casablanca, Ubisoft Montpellier	
Just Dance 2014	PlayStation 4	November 12, 2013	Ubisoft Paris, Ubisoft Bucharest, Ubisoft Milan, Ubisoft Montpellier, Ubisoft Pune, Ubisoft Reflections	
Just Dance 2014	Xbox One	November 12, 2013	Ubisoft Paris, Ubisoft Bucharest, Ubisoft Milan, Ubisoft Montpellier, Ubisoft Pune, Ubisoft Reflections	
Assassin's Creed IV: Black Flag	PlayStation 4	November 15, 2013	Ubisoft Montreal, Ubisoft Annecy, Ubisoft Bucharest, Ubisoft Chengdu, Ubisoft Milan, Ubisoft Montpellier, Ubisoft Quebec, Ubisoft Shanghai, Ubisoft Singapore, Ubisoft Sofia	
Assassin's Creed IV: Black Flag	Microsoft Windows	November 19, 2013	Ubisoft Kyiv	
Fighter Within	Xbox One	November 19, 2013	Daoka	
Assassin's Creed IV: Black Flag	Xbox One	November 22, 2013	Ubisoft Montreal, Ubisoft Annecy, Ubisoft Bucharest, Ubisoft Chengdu, Ubisoft Milan, Ubisoft Montpellier, Ubisoft Quebec, Ubisoft Shanghai, Ubisoft Singapore, Ubisoft Sofia	
Assassin's Creed Pirates	Android	December 5, 2013	Ubisoft Paris Mobile, Ubisoft Craiova Mobile	
Assassin's Creed Pirates	iOS	December 5, 2013	Ubisoft Paris Mobile, Ubisoft Craiova Mobile	
Rabbids Big Bang	Windows Phone	December 17, 2013	Ubisoft Paris, RedLynx, Traplight, Ubisoft Pune	
Assassin's Creed: Liberation HD	Microsoft Windows	January 15, 2014	Ubisoft Sofia	
Assassin's Creed: Liberation HD	PlayStation 3	January 15, 2014	Ubisoft Sofia	
Assassin's Creed: Liberation HD	Xbox 360	January 15, 2014	Ubisoft Sofia	
Rayman Fiesta Run	Windows Phone	January 16, 2014	Ubisoft Casablanca, Ubisoft Montpellier	
Might & Magic X: Legacy	Microsoft Windows	January 23, 2014	Limbic Entertainment, Massive Entertainment, Ubisoft Bucharest, Ubisoft Kyiv	
MotoHeroz	Android	February 5, 2014	RedLynx, Ubisoft Pune	
Far Cry Classic	PlayStation 3	February 11, 2014	Crytek	
Far Cry Classic	Xbox 360	February 11, 2014	Crytek	
Rayman Legends	PlayStation 4	February 18, 2014	Ubisoft Montpellier	
Rayman Legends	Xbox One	February 18, 2014	Ubisoft Montpellier	
South Park: The Stick of Truth	Microsoft Windows	March 4, 2014	Obsidian Entertainment, South Park Digital Studios, Heavy Iron Studios, Magic Pixel Studios	
South Park: The Stick of Truth	PlayStation 3	March 4, 2014	Obsidian Entertainment, South Park Digital Studios, Heavy Iron Studios, Magic Pixel Studios	
South Park: The Stick of Truth	Xbox 360	March 4, 2014	Obsidian Entertainment, South Park Digital Studios, Heavy Iron Studios, Magic Pixel Studios	
Tom Clancy's Ghost Recon Phantoms	Microsoft Windows	April 10, 2014	Ubisoft Singapore	
Trials Frontier	Android	April 13, 2014	RedLynx, Ubisoft Pune, Ubisoft Shanghai	
Trials Frontier	iOS	April 13, 2014	RedLynx, Ubisoft Pune, Ubisoft Shanghai	
Trials Fusion	Microsoft Windows	April 15, 2014	RedLynx, Ubisoft Kyiv, Ubisoft Shanghai	
Trials Fusion	PlayStation 4	April 15, 2014	RedLynx, Ubisoft Kyiv, Ubisoft Shanghai	
Trials Fusion	Xbox 360	April 15, 2014	RedLynx, Ubisoft Kyiv, Ubisoft Shanghai	
Trials Fusion	Xbox One	April 15, 2014	RedLynx, Ubisoft Kyiv, Ubisoft Shanghai	
Might & Magic X: Legacy	Mac OS	April 16, 2014	Limbic Entertainment, Massive Entertainment, Ubisoft Bucharest, Ubisoft Kyiv	
Child of Light	Microsoft Windows	April 30, 2014	Ubisoft Montreal	
Child of Light	PlayStation 3	April 30, 2014	Ubisoft Montreal	
Child of Light	PlayStation 4	April 30, 2014	Ubisoft Montreal	
Child of Light	Wii U	April 30, 2014	Ubisoft Montreal	
Child of Light	Xbox 360	April 30, 2014	Ubisoft Montreal	
Child of Light	Xbox One	April 30, 2014	Ubisoft Montreal	
CSI: Hidden Crimes	Android	May 1, 2014	Ubisoft Abu Dhabi	
CSI: Hidden Crimes	iOS	May 1, 2014	Ubisoft Abu Dhabi	
Watch Dogs	Microsoft Windows	May 27, 2014	Ubisoft Montreal, Ubisoft Paris, Ubisoft Reflections	
Watch Dogs	PlayStation 3	May 27, 2014	Ubisoft Montreal, Ubisoft Paris, Ubisoft Reflections	
Watch Dogs	PlayStation 4	May 27, 2014	Ubisoft Montreal, Ubisoft Paris, Ubisoft Reflections	
Watch Dogs	Xbox 360	May 27, 2014	Ubisoft Montreal, Ubisoft Paris, Ubisoft Reflections	
Watch Dogs	Xbox One	May 27, 2014	Ubisoft Montreal, Ubisoft Paris, Ubisoft Reflections	
Valiant Hearts: The Great War	Microsoft Windows	June 26, 2014	Ubisoft Chengdu	
Valiant Hearts: The Great War	PlayStation 3	June 26, 2014	Ubisoft Montpellier	
Valiant Hearts: The Great War	PlayStation 4	June 26, 2014	Ubisoft Montpellier	
Valiant Hearts: The Great War	Xbox 360	June 26, 2014	Ubisoft Montpellier	
Valiant Hearts: The Great War	Xbox One	June 26, 2014	Ubisoft Montpellier	
Child of Light	PlayStation Vita	July 1, 2014	Ubisoft Montreal	
Assassin's Creed: Memories	iOS	August 21, 2014	GREE	
Little Raiders: Robin's Revenge	Android	August 28, 2014	Future Games of London, Ubisoft Pune	
Little Raiders: Robin's Revenge	iOS	August 28, 2014	Future Games of London, Ubisoft Pune	
Just Dance Now	Android	September 28, 2014	Massive Entertainment, Ubisoft Milan	
Just Dance Now	iOS	September 28, 2014	Massive Entertainment, Ubisoft Milan	
Petz Beach	Nintendo 3DS	October 14, 2014	Ubisoft Osaka	
Petz Countryside	Nintendo 3DS	October 14, 2014	Ubisoft Osaka	
Just Dance 2015	PlayStation 3	October 21, 2014	Ubisoft Paris, Ubisoft Milan, Ubisoft Bucharest, Ubisoft Pune, Ubisoft Reflections	
Just Dance 2015	PlayStation 4	October 21, 2014	Ubisoft Paris, Ubisoft Milan, Ubisoft Bucharest, Ubisoft Pune, Ubisoft Reflections	
Just Dance 2015	Wii	October 21, 2014	Ubisoft Paris, Ubisoft Milan, Ubisoft Bucharest, Ubisoft Pune, Ubisoft Reflections	
Just Dance 2015	Wii U	October 21, 2014	Ubisoft Paris, Ubisoft Milan, Ubisoft Bucharest, Ubisoft Pune, Ubisoft Reflections	
Just Dance 2015	Xbox 360	October 21, 2014	Ubisoft Paris, Ubisoft Milan, Ubisoft Bucharest, Ubisoft Pune, Ubisoft Reflections	
Just Dance 2015	Xbox One	October 21, 2014	Ubisoft Paris, Ubisoft Milan, Ubisoft Bucharest, Ubisoft Pune, Ubisoft Reflections	
Valiant Hearts: The Great War	iOS	November 3, 2014	Ubisoft Casablanca	
Shape Up: Battle Run	Android	November 9, 2014	RocketChicken	
Shape Up: Battle Run	iOS	November 9, 2014	RocketChicken	
Shape Up: Battle Run	Windows Phone	November 9, 2014	RocketChicken	
Assassin's Creed Rogue	PlayStation 3	November 11, 2014	Ubisoft Sofia, Ubisoft Bucharest, Ubisoft Chengdu, Ubisoft Montreal, Ubisoft Quebec, Ubisoft Singapore	
Assassin's Creed Rogue	Xbox 360	November 11, 2014	Ubisoft Sofia, Ubisoft Bucharest, Ubisoft Chengdu, Ubisoft Montreal, Ubisoft Quebec, Ubisoft Singapore	
Assassin's Creed Unity	Microsoft Windows	November 11, 2014	Ubisoft Montreal, Ubisoft Annecy, Ubisoft Kyiv, Ubisoft Quebec, Ubisoft Shanghai, Ubisoft Singapore, Ubisoft Toronto	
Assassin's Creed Unity	PlayStation 4	November 11, 2014	Ubisoft Montreal, Ubisoft Annecy, Ubisoft Kyiv, Ubisoft Quebec, Ubisoft Shanghai, Ubisoft Singapore, Ubisoft Toronto	
Assassin's Creed Unity	Xbox One	November 11, 2014	Ubisoft Montreal, Ubisoft Annecy, Ubisoft Kyiv, Ubisoft Quebec, Ubisoft Shanghai, Ubisoft Singapore, Ubisoft Toronto	
Shape Up	Xbox One	November 11, 2014	Ubisoft Montreal	
Tetris Ultimate	Nintendo 3DS	November 11, 2014	SoMa Play	
Far Cry 4	Microsoft Windows	November 18, 2014	Ubisoft Montreal, Red Storm Entertainment, Ubisoft Kyiv, Ubisoft Shanghai, Ubisoft Toronto	
Far Cry 4	PlayStation 3	November 18, 2014	Ubisoft Montreal, Red Storm Entertainment, Ubisoft Kyiv, Ubisoft Shanghai, Ubisoft Toronto	
Far Cry 4	PlayStation 4	November 18, 2014	Ubisoft Montreal, Red Storm Entertainment, Ubisoft Kyiv, Ubisoft Shanghai, Ubisoft Toronto	
Far Cry 4	Xbox 360	November 18, 2014	Ubisoft Montreal, Red Storm Entertainment, Ubisoft Kyiv, Ubisoft Shanghai, Ubisoft Toronto	
Far Cry 4	Xbox One	November 18, 2014	Ubisoft Montreal, Red Storm Entertainment, Ubisoft Kyiv, Ubisoft Shanghai, Ubisoft Toronto	
Far Cry 4: Arcade Poker	Android	November 18, 2014	Ubisoft Montreal	
Far Cry 4: Arcade Poker	iOS	November 18, 2014	Ubisoft Montreal	
Far Cry 4: Arena Master	Android	November 18, 2014	Ludomade	
Far Cry 4: Arena Master	iOS	November 18, 2014	Ludomade	
Rabbids Invasion: The Interactive TV Show	PlayStation 4	November 18, 2014	Ubisoft Barcelona	
Rabbids Invasion: The Interactive TV Show	Xbox 360	November 18, 2014	Ubisoft Barcelona	
Rabbids Invasion: The Interactive TV Show	Xbox One	November 18, 2014	Ubisoft Barcelona	
Watch Dogs	Wii U	November 18, 2014	Ubisoft Montreal, Ubisoft Paris, Ubisoft Reflections	
Anno: Build an Empire	Android	November 20, 2014	Mi'pu'mi Games, Blue Byte	
Anno: Build an Empire	iOS	November 20, 2014	Mi'pu'mi Games, Blue Byte	
Valiant Hearts: The Great War	Android	November 27, 2014	Ubisoft Casablanca	
Monopoly Deal	PlayStation 4	December 2, 2014	Asobo Studio	
Monopoly Deal	Xbox One	December 2, 2014	Asobo Studio	
Monopoly Plus	PlayStation 4	December 2, 2014	Asobo Studio	
Monopoly Plus	Xbox One	December 2, 2014	Asobo Studio	
The Crew	Microsoft Windows	December 2, 2014	Ivory Tower, Ubisoft Reflections	
The Crew	PlayStation 4	December 2, 2014	Ivory Tower, Ubisoft Reflections	
The Crew	Xbox 360	December 2, 2014	Asobo Studio, Ubisoft Shanghai	
The Crew	Xbox One	December 2, 2014	Ivory Tower, Ubisoft Reflections	
Tetris Ultimate	PlayStation 4	December 16, 2014	SoMa Play	
Tetris Ultimate	Xbox One	December 16, 2014	SoMa Play	
Monopoly Deal	PlayStation 3	January 13, 2015	Asobo Studio	
Monopoly Deal	Xbox 360	January 13, 2015	Asobo Studio	
Monopoly Plus	PlayStation 3	January 13, 2015	Asobo Studio	
Monopoly Plus	Xbox 360	January 13, 2015	Asobo Studio	
Horse Haven: World Adventures	Android	January 21, 2015	Ubisoft Shanghai	
Risk	PlayStation 4	February 3, 2015	Zoë Mode	
Risk	Xbox One	February 3, 2015	Zoë Mode	
Grow Home	Microsoft Windows	February 4, 2015	Ubisoft Reflections	
The Mighty Quest for Epic Loot	Microsoft Windows	February 5, 2015	Ubisoft Montreal	
Monkey King Escape	Android	February 17, 2015	Ubisoft Chengdu	
Monkey King Escape	iOS	February 17, 2015	Ubisoft Chengdu	
Trivial Pursuit Live!	PlayStation 3	February 17, 2015	Longtail Studios	
Trivial Pursuit Live!	PlayStation 4	February 17, 2015	Longtail Studios	
Trivial Pursuit Live!	Xbox 360	February 17, 2015	Longtail Studios	
Trivial Pursuit Live!	Xbox One	February 17, 2015	Longtail Studios	
Assassin's Creed Rogue	Microsoft Windows	March 10, 2015	Ubisoft Kyiv	
Horse Haven: World Adventures	iOS	March 26, 2015	Ubisoft Shanghai	
Driver: Speedboat Paradise	Android	April 7, 2015	Ubisoft Paris Mobile, Ubisoft Craiova Mobile	
Driver: Speedboat Paradise	iOS	April 7, 2015	Ubisoft Paris Mobile, Ubisoft Craiova Mobile	
Assassin's Creed Chronicles: China	Microsoft Windows	April 21, 2015	Climax Studios, Massive Entertainment, Ubisoft Kyiv	
Assassin's Creed Chronicles: China	PlayStation 4	April 21, 2015	Climax Studios	
Assassin's Creed Chronicles: China	Xbox One	April 21, 2015	Climax Studios	
Risk	PlayStation 3	April 28, 2015	Zoë Mode	
Risk	Xbox 360	April 28, 2015	Zoë Mode	
Tetris Ultimate	PlayStation Vita	June 2, 2015	SoMa Play	
Rabbids Appisodes	iOS	June 18, 2015	Ubisoft Paris Mobile, Ubisoft Pune	
Scrabble	PlayStation 4	June 30, 2015	Ubisoft Chengdu	
Scrabble	Xbox One	June 30, 2015	Ubisoft Chengdu	
Boggle	PlayStation 4	August 4, 2015	Frima Studio	
Boggle	Xbox One	August 4, 2015	Frima Studio	
Toy Soldiers: War Chest	Microsoft Windows	August 11, 2015	Signal Studios	
Toy Soldiers: War Chest	PlayStation 4	August 11, 2015	Signal Studios	
Toy Soldiers: War Chest	Xbox One	August 11, 2015	Signal Studios	
Zombi	Microsoft Windows	August 15, 2015	Straight Right	
Zombi	PlayStation 4	August 18, 2015	Ubisoft Montpellier, Ubisoft Bucharest	
Zombi	Xbox One	August 18, 2015	Ubisoft Montpellier, Ubisoft Bucharest	
Grow Home	PlayStation 4	September 1, 2015	Ubisoft Pune	
Might & Magic Heroes VII	Microsoft Windows	September 29, 2015	Limbic Entertainment	
Care Bears: Belly Match	Android	October 9, 2015	Ubisoft Pune	
Care Bears: Belly Match	iOS	October 9, 2015	Ubisoft Pune	
The Smurfs 3D	Nintendo 3DS	October 13, 2015	Magic Pockets	
Gravity Falls: Legend of the Gnome Gemulets	Nintendo 3DS	October 20, 2015	Ubisoft Osaka	
Just Dance 2016	PlayStation 3	October 20, 2015	Ubisoft Paris, Ubisoft Milan, Ubisoft Pune	
Just Dance 2016	PlayStation 4	October 20, 2015	Ubisoft Paris, Ubisoft Milan, Ubisoft Pune	
Just Dance 2016	Wii	October 20, 2015	Ubisoft Paris, Ubisoft Milan, Ubisoft Pune	
Just Dance 2016	Wii U	October 20, 2015	Ubisoft Paris, Ubisoft Milan, Ubisoft Pune	
Just Dance 2016	Xbox 360	October 20, 2015	Ubisoft Paris, Ubisoft Milan, Ubisoft Pune	
Just Dance 2016	Xbox One	October 20, 2015	Ubisoft Paris, Ubisoft Milan, Ubisoft Pune	
Just Dance: Disney Party 2	Wii	October 20, 2015	Ubisoft San Francisco	
Just Dance: Disney Party 2	Wii U	October 20, 2015	Ubisoft San Francisco	
Just Dance: Disney Party 2	Xbox 360	October 20, 2015	Ubisoft San Francisco	
Just Dance: Disney Party 2	Xbox One	October 20, 2015	Ubisoft San Francisco	
Assassin's Creed Syndicate	PlayStation 4	October 23, 2015	Ubisoft Quebec	
Assassin's Creed Syndicate	Xbox One	October 23, 2015	Ubisoft Quebec	
Anno 2205: Asteroid Miner	Android	November 2, 2015	Blue Byte	
Anno 2205: Asteroid Miner	iOS	November 2, 2015	Blue Byte	
Anno 2205	Microsoft Windows	November 3, 2015	Blue Byte	
Grow Home	Linux	November 10, 2015	Ubisoft Reflections	
Assassin's Creed Syndicate	Microsoft Windows	November 18, 2015	Ubisoft Kyiv	
Might & Magic: Heroes Online	Linux	November 24, 2015	Blue Byte	
Might & Magic: Heroes Online	Mac OS	November 24, 2015	Blue Byte	
Might & Magic: Heroes Online	Microsoft Windows	November 24, 2015	Blue Byte	
Tom Clancy's Rainbow Six Siege	Microsoft Windows	December 1, 2015	Ubisoft Montreal, Ubisoft Barcelona, Ubisoft Kyiv, Ubisoft Toronto	
Tom Clancy's Rainbow Six Siege	PlayStation 4	December 1, 2015	Ubisoft Montreal, Ubisoft Barcelona, Ubisoft Kyiv, Ubisoft Toronto	
Tom Clancy's Rainbow Six Siege	Xbox One	December 1, 2015	Ubisoft Montreal, Ubisoft Barcelona, Ubisoft Kyiv, Ubisoft Toronto	
Tom Clancy's EndWar Online	Microsoft Windows	December 3, 2015	Ubisoft Shanghai	
Rayman Adventures	Android	December 5, 2015	Ubisoft Montpellier, Ubisoft Casablanca	
Rayman Adventures	iOS	December 5, 2015	Ubisoft Montpellier, Ubisoft Casablanca	
Just Dance Now	TvOS	December 10, 2015	Massive Entertainment, Ubisoft Milan	
Tetris Ultimate	Microsoft Windows	December 10, 2015	SoMa Play	
The Smurfs: Epic Run	Android	January 12, 2016	Ubisoft Paris Mobile	
The Smurfs: Epic Run	iOS	January 12, 2016	Ubisoft Paris Mobile	
Assassin's Creed Chronicles: India	Microsoft Windows	January 13, 2016	Climax Studios, Ubisoft Barcelona	
Assassin's Creed Chronicles: India	PlayStation 4	January 13, 2016	Climax Studios, Ubisoft Barcelona	
Assassin's Creed Chronicles: India	Xbox One	January 13, 2016	Climax Studios, Ubisoft Barcelona	
Sandstorm: Pirate Wars	Android	January 21, 2016	Ubisoft Barcelona Mobile	
Sandstorm: Pirate Wars	iOS	January 21, 2016	Ubisoft Barcelona Mobile	
Assassin's Creed Chronicles: Russia	Microsoft Windows	February 9, 2016	Climax Studios, Ubisoft Barcelona	
Assassin's Creed Chronicles: Russia	PlayStation 4	February 9, 2016	Climax Studios, Ubisoft Barcelona	
Assassin's Creed Chronicles: Russia	Xbox One	February 9, 2016	Climax Studios, Ubisoft Barcelona	
Rayman	iOS	February 18, 2016	Ubisoft Paris	
Far Cry Primal	PlayStation 4	February 23, 2016	Ubisoft Montreal	
Far Cry Primal	Xbox One	February 23, 2016	Ubisoft Montreal	
Assassin's Creed Identity	iOS	February 26, 2016	Blue Byte	
Far Cry Primal	Microsoft Windows	March 1, 2016	Ubisoft Montreal, Ubisoft Kyiv, Ubisoft Shanghai, Ubisoft Toronto	
Tom Clancy's The Division	Microsoft Windows	March 8, 2016	Massive Entertainment	
Tom Clancy's The Division	PlayStation 4	March 8, 2016	Massive Entertainment	
Tom Clancy's The Division	Xbox One	March 8, 2016	Massive Entertainment	
Rabbids Appisodes	Android	March 9, 2016	Ubisoft Paris Mobile, Ubisoft Pune	
Rayman	Android	March 17, 2016	Ubisoft Paris	
TrackMania Turbo	Microsoft Windows	March 22, 2016	Nadeo, Encore	
TrackMania Turbo	PlayStation 4	March 22, 2016	Nadeo, Encore	
TrackMania Turbo	Xbox One	March 22, 2016	Nadeo, Encore	
The Smurfs: Epic Run	TvOS	April 20, 2016	Ubisoft Paris Mobile	
Hungry Shark: World	iOS	May 4, 2016	Future Games of London	
Rock Gods: Tap Tour	Android	May 16, 2016	Ubisoft Halifax	
Rock Gods: Tap Tour	iOS	May 16, 2016	Ubisoft Halifax	
Assassin's Creed Identity	Android	May 18, 2016	Blue Byte	
Trials of the Blood Dragon	Microsoft Windows	June 13, 2016	RedLynx	
Trials of the Blood Dragon	PlayStation 4	June 13, 2016	RedLynx	
Trials of the Blood Dragon	Xbox One	June 13, 2016	RedLynx	
NCIS: Hidden Crimes	Android	July 11, 2016	Ubisoft Abu Dhabi	
Battleship	PlayStation 4	August 2, 2016	Frima Studio	
Battleship	Xbox One	August 2, 2016	Frima Studio	
Risk: Urban Assault	PlayStation 3	August 2, 2016	Zoë Mode	
Risk: Urban Assault	PlayStation 4	August 2, 2016	Zoë Mode	
Risk: Urban Assault	Xbox 360	August 2, 2016	Zoë Mode	
Risk: Urban Assault	Xbox One	August 2, 2016	Zoë Mode	
Grow Up	Microsoft Windows	August 16, 2016	Ubisoft Reflections	
Grow Up	PlayStation 4	August 16, 2016	Ubisoft Reflections	
Grow Up	Xbox One	August 16, 2016	Ubisoft Reflections	
Uno	PlayStation 4	August 16, 2016	Ubisoft Chengdu	
Uno	Xbox One	August 16, 2016	Ubisoft Chengdu	
Champions of Anteria	Microsoft Windows	August 30, 2016	Blue Byte	
Just Sing	PlayStation 4	September 8, 2016	Inis Corporation	
Just Sing	Xbox One	September 8, 2016	Inis Corporation	
Rabbids Crazy Rush	Android	September 12, 2016	Ubisoft Chengdu	
Rabbids Crazy Rush	iOS	September 12, 2016	Ubisoft Chengdu	
NCIS: Hidden Crimes	iOS	September 15, 2016	Ubisoft Abu Dhabi	
Face Up: The Selfie Game	Android	September 28, 2016	Ubisoft Montreal	
Face Up: The Selfie Game	iOS	September 28, 2016	Ubisoft Montreal	
Rocksmith: All-new 2014 Edition - Remastered	Mac OS	October 4, 2016	Ubisoft San Francisco, Red Storm Entertainment, Longtail Studios	
Rocksmith: All-new 2014 Edition - Remastered	Microsoft Windows	October 4, 2016	Ubisoft San Francisco, Red Storm Entertainment, Longtail Studios	
Rocksmith: All-new 2014 Edition - Remastered	PlayStation 4	October 4, 2016	Ubisoft San Francisco, Red Storm Entertainment, Longtail Studios	
Rocksmith: All-new 2014 Edition - Remastered	Xbox One	October 4, 2016	Ubisoft San Francisco, Red Storm Entertainment, Longtail Studios	
Hungry Shark: World	Android	October 16, 2016	Future Games of London	
Eagle Flight	Microsoft Windows	October 18, 2016	Ubisoft Montreal	
Just Dance 2017	Microsoft Windows	October 25, 2016	Ubisoft Paris, Ubisoft Pune	
Just Dance 2017	PlayStation 3	October 25, 2016	Ubisoft Paris, Ubisoft Pune	
Just Dance 2017	PlayStation 4	October 25, 2016	Ubisoft Paris, Ubisoft Pune	
Just Dance 2017	Wii	October 25, 2016	Ubisoft Paris, Ubisoft Pune	
Just Dance 2017	Wii U	October 25, 2016	Ubisoft Paris, Ubisoft Pune	
Just Dance 2017	Xbox 360	October 25, 2016	Ubisoft Paris, Ubisoft Pune	
Just Dance 2017	Xbox One	October 25, 2016	Ubisoft Paris, Ubisoft Pune	
Eagle Flight	PlayStation 4	November 8, 2016	Ubisoft Montreal	
Assassin's Creed: The Ezio Collection	PlayStation 4	November 15, 2016	Virtuos	
Assassin's Creed: The Ezio Collection	Xbox One	November 15, 2016	Virtuos	
Watch Dogs 2	Microsoft Windows	November 15, 2016	Ubisoft Montreal	
Watch Dogs 2	PlayStation 4	November 15, 2016	Ubisoft Montreal	
Watch Dogs 2	Xbox One	November 15, 2016	Ubisoft Montreal	
Steep	Microsoft Windows	December 2, 2016	Ubisoft Annecy, Ubisoft Kyiv, Ubisoft Montpellier, Ubisoft Sofia	
Steep	PlayStation 4	December 2, 2016	Ubisoft Annecy, Ubisoft Kyiv, Ubisoft Montpellier, Ubisoft Sofia	
Steep	Xbox One	December 2, 2016	Ubisoft Annecy, Ubisoft Kyiv, Ubisoft Montpellier, Ubisoft Sofia	
Werewolves Within	Microsoft Windows	December 6, 2016	Red Storm Entertainment	
Werewolves Within	PlayStation 4	December 6, 2016	Red Storm Entertainment	
Uno	Microsoft Windows	January 3, 2017	Ubisoft Chengdu	
City of Love: Paris	Android	January 18, 2017	Ubisoft Paris Mobile	
City of Love: Paris	iOS	January 18, 2017	Ubisoft Paris Mobile	
For Honor	Microsoft Windows	February 14, 2017	Ubisoft Montreal	
For Honor	PlayStation 4	February 14, 2017	Ubisoft Montreal	
For Honor	Xbox One	February 14, 2017	Ubisoft Montreal	
Just Dance 2017	Nintendo Switch	March 3, 2017	Ubisoft Paris, Ubisoft Pune	
Tom Clancy's Ghost Recon Wildlands	Microsoft Windows	March 7, 2017	Ubisoft Paris, Ubisoft Milan, Ubisoft Annecy, Ubisoft Belgrade, Ubisoft Bucharest, Ubisoft Montpellier, Ubisoft Reflections	
Tom Clancy's Ghost Recon Wildlands	PlayStation 4	March 7, 2017	Ubisoft Paris, Ubisoft Milan, Ubisoft Annecy, Ubisoft Belgrade, Ubisoft Bucharest, Ubisoft Montpellier, Ubisoft Reflections	
Tom Clancy's Ghost Recon Wildlands	Xbox One	March 7, 2017	Ubisoft Paris, Ubisoft Milan, Ubisoft Annecy, Ubisoft Belgrade, Ubisoft Bucharest, Ubisoft Montpellier, Ubisoft Reflections	
TrackMania 2: Lagoon	Microsoft Windows	May 23, 2017	Nadeo	
Star Trek: Bridge Crew	Microsoft Windows	May 30, 2017	Red Storm Entertainment, Ubisoft Barcelona	
Star Trek: Bridge Crew	PlayStation 4	May 30, 2017	Red Storm Entertainment, Ubisoft Barcelona	
Mario + Rabbids Kingdom Battle	Nintendo Switch	August 29, 2017	Ubisoft Milan, Ubisoft Paris	
Monopoly Plus	Microsoft Windows	September 7, 2017	Ubisoft Pune	
Rayman Legends: Definitive Edition	Nintendo Switch	September 17, 2017	Ubisoft Montpellier	
Atomega	Microsoft Windows	September 19, 2017	Ubisoft Reflections	
Hungry Shark: World	TvOS	September 28, 2017	Future Games of London	
South Park: The Fractured But Whole	Microsoft Windows	October 17, 2017	Ubisoft San Francisco	
South Park: The Fractured But Whole	PlayStation 4	October 17, 2017	Ubisoft San Francisco	
South Park: The Fractured But Whole	Xbox One	October 17, 2017	Ubisoft San Francisco	
Just Dance 2018	Nintendo Switch	October 24, 2017	Ubisoft Paris, Ubisoft Bucharest, Ubisoft Montreal, Ubisoft Pune, Ubisoft Shanghai	
Just Dance 2018	PlayStation 3	October 24, 2017	Ubisoft Paris, Ubisoft Bucharest, Ubisoft Montreal, Ubisoft Pune, Ubisoft Shanghai	
Just Dance 2018	PlayStation 4	October 24, 2017	Ubisoft Paris, Ubisoft Bucharest, Ubisoft Montreal, Ubisoft Pune, Ubisoft Shanghai	
Just Dance 2018	Wii	October 24, 2017	Ubisoft Paris, Ubisoft Bucharest, Ubisoft Montreal, Ubisoft Pune, Ubisoft Shanghai	
Just Dance 2018	Wii U	October 24, 2017	Ubisoft Paris, Ubisoft Bucharest, Ubisoft Montreal, Ubisoft Pune, Ubisoft Shanghai	
Just Dance 2018	Xbox 360	October 24, 2017	Ubisoft Paris, Ubisoft Bucharest, Ubisoft Montreal, Ubisoft Pune, Ubisoft Shanghai	
Just Dance 2018	Xbox One	October 24, 2017	Ubisoft Paris, Ubisoft Bucharest, Ubisoft Montreal, Ubisoft Pune, Ubisoft Shanghai	
Assassin's Creed Origins	Microsoft Windows	October 27, 2017	Ubisoft Montreal	
Assassin's Creed Origins	PlayStation 4	October 27, 2017	Ubisoft Montreal	
Assassin's Creed Origins	Xbox One	October 27, 2017	Ubisoft Montreal	
Monopoly	Nintendo Switch	October 31, 2017	Asobo Studio	
Jeopardy!	PlayStation 4	November 7, 2017	Frima Studio	
Jeopardy!	Xbox One	November 7, 2017	Frima Studio	
Uno	Nintendo Switch	November 7, 2017	Ubisoft Chengdu	
Wheel of Fortune	PlayStation 4	November 7, 2017	Ubisoft Chengdu	
Wheel of Fortune	Xbox One	November 7, 2017	Ubisoft Chengdu	
South Park: Phone Destroyer	Android	November 9, 2017	RedLynx, South Park Digital Studios, Ubisoft Pune	
South Park: Phone Destroyer	iOS	November 9, 2017	RedLynx, South Park Digital Studios, Ubisoft Pune	
Ode	Microsoft Windows	November 27, 2017	Ubisoft Reflections	
South Park: The Stick of Truth	PlayStation 4	February 13, 2018	Obsidian Entertainment, South Park Digital Studios	
South Park: The Stick of Truth	Xbox One	February 13, 2018	Obsidian Entertainment, South Park Digital Studios	
Discovery Tour: Assassin's Creed - Ancient Egypt	Microsoft Windows	February 20, 2018	Ubisoft Montreal	
Hungry Dragon	Android	February 22, 2018	Ubisoft Barcelona Mobile	
Hungry Dragon	iOS	February 22, 2018	Ubisoft Barcelona Mobile	
Assassin's Creed Rogue Remastered	PlayStation 4	March 20, 2018	Ubisoft Sofia, Ubisoft Bucharest, Ubisoft Chengdu, Ubisoft Montreal, Ubisoft Quebec, Ubisoft Shanghai, Ubisoft Singapore	
Assassin's Creed Rogue Remastered	Xbox One	March 20, 2018	Ubisoft Sofia, Ubisoft Bucharest, Ubisoft Chengdu, Ubisoft Montreal, Ubisoft Quebec, Ubisoft Shanghai, Ubisoft Singapore	
Far Cry 5	Microsoft Windows	March 27, 2018	Ubisoft Montreal, Ubisoft Toronto	
Far Cry 5	PlayStation 4	March 27, 2018	Ubisoft Montreal, Ubisoft Toronto	
Far Cry 5	Xbox One	March 27, 2018	Ubisoft Montreal, Ubisoft Toronto	
South Park: The Fractured But Whole	Nintendo Switch	April 24, 2018	Ubisoft San Francisco	
Far Cry 3: Classic Edition	PlayStation 4	May 29, 2018	Ubisoft Pune	
Far Cry 3: Classic Edition	Xbox One	May 29, 2018	Ubisoft Pune	
The Crew 2	Microsoft Windows	June 29, 2018	Ivory Tower	
The Crew 2	PlayStation 4	June 29, 2018	Ivory Tower	
The Crew 2	Xbox One	June 29, 2018	Ivory Tower	
Hungry Shark: World	Nintendo Switch	July 17, 2018	Future Games of London	
Hungry Shark: World	PlayStation 4	July 17, 2018	Future Games of London	
Hungry Shark: World	Xbox One	July 17, 2018	Future Games of London	
The Settlers: History Edition	Microsoft Windows	August 21, 2018	Ubisoft Blue Byte	
Legendary Fishing	New Nintendo 3DS	September 18, 2018	Sims	
Legendary Fishing	Nintendo Switch	September 18, 2018	Sims	
Legendary Fishing	PlayStation 4	September 18, 2018	Sims	
Transference	Microsoft Windows	September 18, 2018	SpectreVision, Ubisoft Montreal	
Transference	PlayStation 4	September 18, 2018	SpectreVision, Ubisoft Montreal	
Transference	Xbox One	September 18, 2018	SpectreVision, Ubisoft Montreal	
South Park: The Stick of Truth	Nintendo Switch	September 25, 2018	Obsidian Entertainment, South Park Digital Studios, Heavy Iron Studios, Magic Pixel Studios	
Assassin's Creed Odyssey	Microsoft Windows	October 5, 2018	Ubisoft Quebec	
Assassin's Creed Odyssey	PlayStation 4	October 5, 2018	Ubisoft Quebec	
Assassin's Creed Odyssey	Xbox One	October 5, 2018	Ubisoft Quebec	
Child of Light: Ultimate Edition	Nintendo Switch	October 11, 2018	Ubisoft Montreal	
Starlink: Battle for Atlas	Nintendo Switch	October 16, 2018	Virtuos	
Starlink: Battle for Atlas	PlayStation 4	October 16, 2018	Ubisoft Toronto, Red Storm Entertainment, Ubisoft Leamington, Ubisoft Reflections, Ubisoft San Francisco	
Starlink: Battle for Atlas	Xbox One	October 16, 2018	Ubisoft Toronto, Red Storm Entertainment, Ubisoft Leamington, Ubisoft Reflections, Ubisoft San Francisco	
Just Dance 2019	Nintendo Switch	October 23, 2018	Ubisoft Paris, Ubisoft Pune, Ubisoft Shanghai	
Just Dance 2019	PlayStation 4	October 23, 2018	Ubisoft Paris, Ubisoft Pune, Ubisoft Shanghai	
Just Dance 2019	Wii	October 23, 2018	Ubisoft Paris, Ubisoft Pune, Ubisoft Shanghai	
Just Dance 2019	Wii U	October 23, 2018	Ubisoft Paris, Ubisoft Pune, Ubisoft Shanghai	
Just Dance 2019	Xbox 360	October 23, 2018	Ubisoft Paris, Ubisoft Pune, Ubisoft Shanghai	
Just Dance 2019	Xbox One	October 23, 2018	Ubisoft Paris, Ubisoft Pune, Ubisoft Shanghai	
Jeopardy!	Nintendo Switch	October 30, 2018	Frima Studio	
Sports Party	Nintendo Switch	October 30, 2018	Magic Pockets	
Trivial Pursuit Live!	Nintendo Switch	October 30, 2018	Ubisoft Chengdu	
Wheel of Fortune	Nintendo Switch	October 30, 2018	Ubisoft Chengdu	
Brawlhalla	Nintendo Switch	November 6, 2018	Blue Mammoth Games	
Brawlhalla	Xbox One	November 6, 2018	Blue Mammoth Games	
Brawlhalla	PlayStation 4	November 6, 2018	Blue Mammoth Games	
Brawlhalla	Microsoft Windows	November 6, 2018	Blue Mammoth Games	
Valiant Hearts: The Great War	Nintendo Switch	November 8, 2018	Ubisoft Montpellier	
Assassin's Creed: Rebellion	Android	November 20, 2018	Behaviour Interactive	
Assassin's Creed: Rebellion	iOS	November 20, 2018	Behaviour Interactive	
Far Cry New Dawn	Microsoft Windows	February 15, 2019	Ubisoft Montreal	
Far Cry New Dawn	PlayStation 4	February 15, 2019	Ubisoft Montreal	
Far Cry New Dawn	Xbox One	February 15, 2019	Ubisoft Montreal	
Anno 1800	Microsoft Windows	February 16, 2019	Ubisoft Blue Byte	
Trials Rising	Microsoft Windows	February 26, 2019	RedLynx, Ubisoft Kyiv, Ubisoft Shanghai	
Trials Rising	Nintendo Switch	February 26, 2019	RedLynx, Ubisoft Kyiv	
Trials Rising	PlayStation 4	February 26, 2019	RedLynx, Ubisoft Kyiv	
Trials Rising	Xbox One	February 26, 2019	RedLynx, Ubisoft Kyiv	
Tom Clancy's The Division 2	Microsoft Windows	March 15, 2019	Massive Entertainment, Red Storm Entertainment, Ubisoft Annecy, Ubisoft Bucharest, Ubisoft Leamington, Ubisoft Reflections, Ubisoft Shanghai, Ubisoft Sofia	
Tom Clancy's The Division 2	PlayStation 4	March 15, 2019	Massive Entertainment, Red Storm Entertainment, Ubisoft Annecy, Ubisoft Bucharest, Ubisoft Leamington, Ubisoft Reflections, Ubisoft Shanghai, Ubisoft Sofia	
Tom Clancy's The Division 2	Xbox One	March 15, 2019	Massive Entertainment, Red Storm Entertainment, Ubisoft Annecy, Ubisoft Bucharest, Ubisoft Leamington, Ubisoft Reflections, Ubisoft Shanghai, Ubisoft Sofia	
Space Junkies	Microsoft Windows	March 26, 2019	Ubisoft Montpellier	
Space Junkies	PlayStation 4	March 26, 2019	Ubisoft Montpellier	
Growtopia	Nintendo Switch	March 28, 2019	Hamumu Software, Robinson Technologies	
Assassin's Creed III Remastered	Microsoft Windows	March 29, 2019	Ubisoft Barcelona, Ubisoft Philippines, Ubisoft Shanghai	
Assassin's Creed III Remastered	PlayStation 4	March 29, 2019	Ubisoft Barcelona, Ubisoft Philippines, Ubisoft Shanghai	
Assassin's Creed III Remastered	Xbox One	March 29, 2019	Ubisoft Barcelona, Ubisoft Philippines, Ubisoft Shanghai	
Starlink: Battle for Atlas	Microsoft Windows	April 30, 2019	Ubisoft Toronto, Red Storm Entertainment, Ubisoft Leamington, Ubisoft Reflections, Ubisoft San Francisco	
Assassin's Creed III Remastered	Nintendo Switch	May 21, 2019	Ubisoft Barcelona, Ubisoft Philippines, Ubisoft Shanghai	
The Mighty Quest for Epic Loot	Android	May 22, 2019	Ubisoft Paris Mobile	
The Mighty Quest for Epic Loot	iOS	May 22, 2019	Ubisoft Paris Mobile	
Growtopia	PlayStation 4	July 18, 2019	Hamumu Software, Robinson Technologies	
Growtopia	Xbox One	July 18, 2019	Hamumu Software, Robinson Technologies	
Discovery Tour: Assassin's Creed - Ancient Greece	Microsoft Windows	September 10, 2019	Ubisoft Montreal	
Rayman Mini	iOS	September 19, 2019	Ubisoft Montpellier, Pastagames	
Rayman Mini	TvOS	September 24, 2019	Ubisoft Montpellier, Pastagames	
Tom Clancy's Ghost Recon Breakpoint	Microsoft Windows	October 4, 2019	Ubisoft Paris, Ubisoft Belgrad, Ubisoft Bordeaux, Ubisoft Bucharest, Ubisoft Kyiv, Ubisoft Milan, Ubisoft Montpellier, Ubisoft Odesa	
Tom Clancy's Ghost Recon Breakpoint	PlayStation 4	October 4, 2019	Ubisoft Paris, Ubisoft Belgrad, Ubisoft Bordeaux, Ubisoft Bucharest, Ubisoft Kyiv, Ubisoft Milan, Ubisoft Montpellier, Ubisoft Odesa	
Tom Clancy's Ghost Recon Breakpoint	Xbox One	October 4, 2019	Ubisoft Paris, Ubisoft Belgrad, Ubisoft Bordeaux, Ubisoft Bucharest, Ubisoft Kyiv, Ubisoft Milan, Ubisoft Montpellier, Ubisoft Odesa	
Rabbids: Coding!	Microsoft Windows	October 8, 2019	Ubisoft Montreal	
Rayman Mini	Mac OS	October 18, 2019	Ubisoft Montpellier, Pastagames	
Just Dance 2020	Nintendo Switch	November 5, 2019	Ubisoft Paris, Ubisoft Bordeaux, Ubisoft Pune, Ubisoft Shanghai	
Just Dance 2020	PlayStation 4	November 5, 2019	Ubisoft Paris, Ubisoft Bordeaux, Ubisoft Pune, Ubisoft Shanghai	
Just Dance 2020	Wii	November 5, 2019	Ubisoft Paris, Ubisoft Bordeaux, Ubisoft Pune, Ubisoft Shanghai	
Just Dance 2020	Xbox One	November 5, 2019	Ubisoft Paris, Ubisoft Bordeaux, Ubisoft Pune, Ubisoft Shanghai	
Assassin's Creed Odyssey	Stadia	November 19, 2019	Ubisoft Quebec	
Just Dance 2020	Stadia	November 19, 2019	Ubisoft Paris, Ubisoft Bordeaux, Ubisoft Pune, Ubisoft Shanghai	
Might & Magic Heroes: Era of Chaos	Android	November 26, 2019	Playcrab	
Might & Magic Heroes: Era of Chaos	iOS	November 26, 2019	Playcrab	
Assassin's Creed: The Rebel Collection	Nintendo Switch	December 6, 2019	Ubisoft Sofia	
Star Trek: Bridge Crew	Oculus Quest	December 16, 2019	Red Storm Entertainment, Ubisoft Barcelona	
Tom Clancy's Ghost Recon Breakpoint	Stadia	December 18, 2019	Ubisoft Paris, Ubisoft Belgrad, Ubisoft Bordeaux, Ubisoft Bucharest, Ubisoft Kyiv, Ubisoft Milan, Ubisoft Montpellier, Ubisoft Odesa	
