= List of Ubisoft games =

Ubisoft is a video game company based in Saint-Mandé, France. Founded by five brothers in 1986, Ubisoft is well known for developing franchises such as Assassin's Creed, Far Cry, Just Dance, Prince of Persia, Tom Clancy's franchise, Watch Dogs, The Crew, TrackMania, Trials and Rayman.

== Lists of games ==
- List of Ubisoft games: 1986–1999
- List of Ubisoft games: 2000–2009
- List of Ubisoft games: 2010–2019
- List of Ubisoft games: 2020–present

== Cancelled games ==
- Aliens Versus Predator for Game Boy Advance
- America's Army: Rise of a Soldier for PlayStation 2
- Animalz Marine Zoo for Nintendo DS
- Arcatera for Dreamcast
- Assassin's Creed: Lost Legacy for Nintendo 3DS
- Assassin's Creed Utopia for Android, iOS
- Babyz Party for Wii
- Bonx for Game Boy Advance
- Bratz: Formal Funk for PlayStation 2
- Brothers in Arms: Furious 4 for Windows, PlayStation 4, Xbox One
- Call of Juarez for Xbox
- Campus for PlayStation 2, Xbox
- Charlie's Angels for Game Boy Advance, Xbox
- Cloudberry Kingdom for PlayStation Vita
- Crouching Tiger, Hidden Dragon for GameCube
- Dance on Broadway for Nintendo DS
- Dragon Riders for Game Boy Color
- E.T.: Return to the Green Planet for PlayStation 2
- Far Cry Instincts for PlayStation 2
- F1 Racing Championship 2 for Windows, PlayStation 2
- Funky Barn for Nintendo 3DS
- Gold and Glory: The Road to El Dorado for Dreamcast
- Guitar Hits for PlayStation Portable
- Haze for PlayStation 3
- Heroes for PlayStation 3, Xbox 360
- Imagine: Animal Doctor for Windows
- Killer Freaks from Outer Space for Wii U
- Killing Day for PlayStation 3, Xbox 360
- Larry Bond's Harpoon 4 for Windows
- Might & Magic Raiders for Browser
- My Life Coach for Nintendo DS
- Petz: Monkeyz House for Windows
- Project Q for Windows, PlayStation 4, PlayStation 5, Xbox One, Xbox Series X/S
- Rayman for Super Nintendo Entertainment System
- Rayman 2 for Sega Saturn
- Rayman 4
- Rayman 4: Raving Rabbids
- Steep for Nintendo Switch
- TMNT for PlayStation 3
- Tom Clancy's Ghost Recon 2 for Windows
- Tom Clancy's Ghost Recon Advanced Warfighter for GameCube
- Tom Clancy's Ghost Recon Advanced Warfighter 2 for Wii
- Tom Clancy's Ghost Recon Commander for Browser
- Tom Clancy's Ghost Recon Frontline for Windows, PlayStation 4, PlayStation 5, Xbox One, Xbox Series X/S, Google Stadia
- Tom Clancy's Ghost Recon: Future Soldier for Nintendo DS, PlayStation Portable
- Tom Clancy's Ghost Recon: Island Thunder for PlayStation 2
- Tom Clancy's Ghost Recon Phantoms for Wii U
- Tom Clancy's Rainbow 6: Patriots for Windows, PlayStation 3, PlayStation 4, Xbox 360, Xbox One
- Tom Clancy's Rainbow Six: Critical Hour for PlayStation 2
- Tom Clancy's Rainbow Six: Rogue Spear for PlayStation 2
- Tom Clancy's Rainbow Six: Vegas for GameCube, PlayStation 2, Xbox
- Tom Clancy's Splinter Cell for Meta Quest 2
- Tom Clancy's The Division Heartland for Windows, PlayStation 5, Xbox One
- V.I.P. for Dreamcast
- Wild for PlayStation 5
- Wildwaters for Nintendo 64
- ZombiU 2 for Wii U
- Prince of Persia: The Sands of Time remake for Windows, PlayStation 4, Xbox One
