= Elias Toufexis =

Canadian-American actor

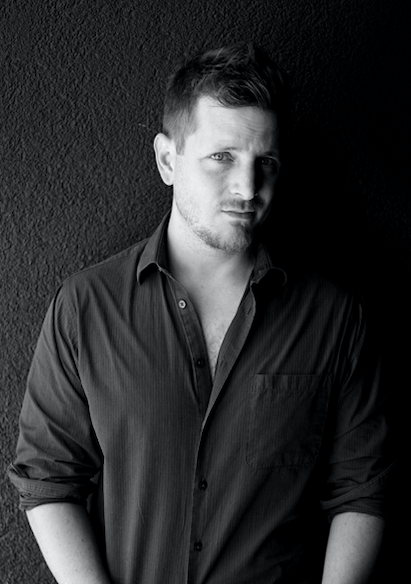
- Toufexis in 2019
- Born: Montreal, Quebec, Canada
- Citizenship: Canadian; American
- Years active: 2000–present
- Spouse: Michelle Boback (m. 2007)
- Children: 2
- Website: www.eliastoufexis.com

Elias Toufexis (/tuːˈfɛksɪs/, too-FEK-sis) is a Canadian-American actor. He has played characters on television and in video games, mostly in science fiction and fantasy genres. He is known as the voice of Adam Jensen in Deus Ex: Human Revolution and its sequel, Deus Ex: Mankind Divided.

== Career ==
=== Film and television ===
Toufexis acted in small television roles at first, eventually playing Morton in the made-for-television film The Five People You Meet in Heaven, based on a book by Mitch Albom.

He then played Webber in an episode of Supernatural. Toufexis followed this with his second appearance on Smallville as Bronson, a character who can travel between radio frequencies and kidnaps Lex Luthor. His third character on Smallville was Emil Lasalle, a.k.a. Warp, a member of the Suicide Squad from DC Comics.

He has since appeared on dozens of television shows, including Criminal Minds, The Listener, Painkiller Jane, Flashpoint, Flash Gordon, Stargate Atlantis, Lost Girl, and Houdini & Doyle.

He has also appeared on The Expanse, where he plays two characters. In season one, he plays the role of Kenzo Gabriel, a spy who joins the crew of the Rocinante. In season two, he portrays, via performance capture, the role of the hybrid creature or "The Seventh Man".

In 2022, Toufexis joined the cast of the fifth season of Star Trek Discovery as the recurring character L'ak, filmed in 2022 and 2023, with an announced 2024 release.

=== Video games ===
Toufexis began his video game voice-over and performance-capture career in 2006 with Need for Speed: Carbon. Two of his most popular characters are Andriy Kobin and Adam Jensen. Kobin is one of the villains in Tom Clancy's Splinter Cell: Conviction. He reprised the role, this time as a main supporting character in Tom Clancy's Splinter Cell: Blacklist. Adam Jensen is the main character in Deus Ex: Human Revolution; Toufexis' wife, Michelle Boback, had a supporting role in this game as scientist Megan Reed. Toufexis has publicly stated that he is a fan of the Deus Ex series, particularly the one released in 2000. Toufexis was cast to play the protagonist of Far Cry 3, Jason Brody. However, he was replaced by another voice actor, Gianpaolo Venuta, after he worked on the role for two years, as the publisher of the game did not want players to confuse Brody with Jensen. He played the lead role in Far Cry Primal, a spin-off of the Far Cry series. Toufexis reprised his role as Jensen in Deus Ex: Mankind Divided, a sequel to Human Revolution. On February 28, 2018, Toufexis announced on Twitter that he was voicing a character in the new BattleTech video game by Harebrained Schemes, stating that he had sought out a role and was accepted. That character was later revealed to be Commodore Samuel Ostergaard of the Taurian Concordat Navy, a primary antagonist in the game.

== Personal life ==
Toufexis became a naturalized American citizen on January 27, 2025.

== Filmography ==
=== Film ===
List of film appearances, with year, title, and role shown
Year	Title	Role	Notes
2004	Brilliant	Adam	
2004	Decoys	Roger	
2007	Max Steel: Dark Rival	Iago	Voice role
2008	Max Steel: Bio Crisis	Iago	Voice role
2012	Imaginaerum	Mr. White	Voice role
2013	The Legend of Sarila	Kauji	Voice role
2013	Louis Cyr	Bryce Johnston	
2015	Len and Company	Robert	

=== Television ===
List of television appearances, with year, title, and role shown
Year	Title	Role	Notes
2004	Fries with That?	Dwayne	1 episode
2004	The Days	Josh	1 episode
2004	The Dead Zone	Punk #2	1 episode
2004	Dead Like Me	Brian	1 episode
2004	The Five People You Meet in Heaven	Morton	TV movie
2004, 2006, 2010	Smallville	Emil LaSalle, Bronson, Luke	3 episodes
2005	Da Vinci's Inquest	Constable Dan Archibald	2 episodes
2005	Bloodsuckers	Officer Brackish	TV movie
2006	The Collector	Zeke	1 episode
2006	Blade: The Series	Young Donny Flannigan	1 episode
2006	Kraken: Tentacles of the Deep	Keith	TV movie
2006	Supernatural	Ansem 'Webber' Weems	1 episode
2006	Stargate Atlantis	Replicator	2 episodes
2007	Painkiller Jane	Howie	1 episode
2007	Flash Gordon	Rundle	1 episode
2009	Sand Serpents	Private Andrews	TV movie
2010	Eureka	Adam Barlowe	3 episodes
2010	Lost Girl	Michael Connel	1 episode
2011	The Listener	Dmitry Volkov	1 episode
2011	Against the Wall	O'Leary	1 episode
2011	Flashpoint	Danny Lucic	1 episode
2012	Rookie Blue	Charlie Davis	2 episodes
2012	Alphas	Cornell Scipio	4 episodes
2013	Zero Hour	Colleague	1 episode
2013	Played	Donny Blair	1 episode
2014	Ascension	Mark Hayes	1 episode
2014–2016	Bitten	Joey Stillwell	Recurring role
2016	Honest Trailers	Adam Jensen / Himself	Web series; guest star
2016	Houdini & Doyle	Roland Carson	1 episode
2016–2018	The Expanse	Kenzo, US Marine, Hybrid, Monster	Recurring role (Kenzo, season 1); guest roles (seasons 2–3)
2017	Shadowhunters	Jonathan Morgenstern	2 episodes
2017	Star Trek: Discovery	Cold	Episode: "Context is for Kings"
2019	Criminal Minds	Dustin Eisworth	Episode: "Night Lights"
2019–2020	Marisa Romanov		Main role
2020–2025	Blood of Zeus	Seraphim	Main voice role
2021	FBI	Curt Williams	1 episode
2021–2022	Blade Runner: Black Lotus	Drove, SWAT officer, guard A	Voice; 4 episodes
2022	New Amsterdam	Ronnie Cooper	2 episodes
2024	Star Trek: Discovery	L'ak	Recurring role

=== Video games ===
List of video game appearances, with year, title, and role shown
Year	Title	Role	Notes
2006	Need for Speed: Carbon	Sal Mustela	
2007	Assassin's Creed	Rafiq informers	
2008	Tom Clancy's Rainbow Six: Vegas 2	Gabriel Nowak	
2008	Tom Clancy's EndWar	X-397 pilot	
2008	Suikoden Tierkreis	Asad / Logan	
2009	Assassin's Creed II	Federico Auditore da Firenze, Ugo	
2010	Silent Hunter 5		Motion capture
2010	Tom Clancy's Splinter Cell: Conviction	Andriy Kobin	
2010	Prince of Persia: The Forgotten Sands	Malik's Royal guardsman	
2010	Tom Clancy's H.A.W.X 2	miscellaneous	
2010	Shaun White Skateboarding	Snail	
2010	Assassin's Creed: Brotherhood	Federico Auditore da Firenze	
2011	Deus Ex: Human Revolution	Adam Jensen	
2011	James Noir's Hollywood Crimes	Lt. Matt Booker	
2011	Assassin's Creed: Revelations	Byzantine guards	
2012	I Am Alive	Henry	
2013	Dota 2	Adam Jensen announcer	2016 DLC
2013	Tom Clancy's Splinter Cell: Blacklist	Andriy Kobin	
2013	Contrast	Johnny Fenris	
2014	Hearthstone: Heroes of Warcraft	Husam, infested goblin, Nightmare	
2014	Assassin's Creed Unity	Jacques Roux	
2015	Dying Light	Christof Merpe	Cuisine & Cargo DLC
2015	Hellraid	Alistair the Knight	Cancelled
2016	Fallout 4: Far Harbor	Grand Zealot Brian Richter, Cog	
2016	Far Cry Primal	Takkar	
2016	Deus Ex: Mankind Divided	Adam Jensen	
2017	Fortnite	Ragnarok, The Major	
2017	The Long Dark	Mathis	
2018	BattleTech	Commodore Samuel Ostergaard	
2018	Thief of Thieves	Erasmo Nicchi	
2018	Marvel's Spider-Man	additional voices	
2018	Call of Duty: Black Ops 4	additional voices	
2018	Lego DC Super-Villains	Arkham cop, Parademons	
2018	Assassin's Creed: Odyssey	Leonidas, Nikolaos	
2018	Last Year: The Nightmare	Slasher	
2019	Death Stranding	The Timefall Farmer / Mule	
2019	MechWarrior 5: Mercenaries	Sebastian Spears	
2020	The Last of Us: Part II	additional voices	
2020	Call of Duty: Black Ops Cold War	Maxim Antonov	
2020	Immortals Fenyx Rising	Prometheus	
2021	The Walking Dead: Survivors	Vayne	
2021	Back 4 Blood	Garner	
2022	Horizon Forbidden West	additional voices	
2022	As Dusk Falls	Vincent "Vince" Walker	
2022	Gotham Knights	Oswald Cobblepot / Penguin	
2023	Starfield	Sam Coe	
2023	Star Trek: Resurgence	Galvan, Hadri	
2024	Flintlock: The Siege of Dawn	Baz	
2025	Dynasty Warriors: Origins	Yu Jin	
2025	Hell Is Us	Rémi Letam	
2026	Marathon	Assassin	
2026	Star Wars: Zero Company	The Gunny	
TBA	Emberville	Unannounced role	In production
