= Gundam Side Story 0079: Rise from the Ashes =

1999 video game

- North American Dreamcast cover art
- Developer: BEC
- Publisher: Bandai
- Composers: Takanori Arima, Koji Yamada
- Platform: Dreamcast
- Release: JP: August 26, 1999; NA: April 28, 2000
- Genre: Action
- Mode: Single-player

Gundam Side Story 0079: Rise From the Ashes (Note: Japanese: 機動戦士ガンダム外伝 コロニーの落ちた地で..., Hepburn: Kidou Senshi Gundam Gaiden: Colony no Ochitachi de...) is a video game that was released for the Dreamcast. It is based in the Universal Century timeline of the popular Mobile Suit Gundam franchise. It was developed by BEC and published by Bandai. It takes place in Australia, following an elite squad of RGM-79 GMs (known as the "White Dingo" squad) who are charged with various missions pertaining to the attacks by the Principality of Zeon.

== Gameplay details ==
The game allows players to pilot mobile suits through a first-person cockpit view. It also requires the player to employ team-tactics with two AI-controlled teammates.

The player can normally choose from two mobile suits, the standard RGM-79 GM, a decent all around mobile suit, or the heavier RGC-80 GM Cannon, a mobile suit with a cannon attached to its shoulder. If a certain mission was completed successfully, a third mobile suit, the RX-77D Mass-Production Type, a heavy mobile suit with dual cannons on its shoulders, and a machine gun in each hand, could be unlocked.

The very last mission of the game puts the player in the cockpit of the RGM-79SP GM Sniper II, a modified version of the RGM-79 GM Sniper decked out in blue and white colors.

The game has nine stages set all over Australia in an attempt to stop Zeon from developing and releasing Astaroth, a biological weapon capable of accelerating the growth of plant life on the Earth, turning it into an uninhabitable forest.

After completing the game, the player could open up an "Extra Options" menu with customizable "cheats" like Lunar Titanium Alloy (larger health bar) or certain weapons, like the Prototype Beam Rifle used in the GAW Assault Carrier mission.

== Weapons ==
Machine Gun: A light, rapid-fire weapon with 30 rounds, and no delay for reloading.

Rocket Launcher: A heavier rocket launcher with only 8 rounds. It deals significantly more damage, and can stagger suits, but has a large reloading delay.

Prototype Beam Rifle: Only selectable in one mission, this rifle holds enough power to destroy an enemy mobile suit with a single shot. It has a 6 shot capacity, and an extremely long reloading delay. Unlockable through the "Extra Options" menu.

Beam Spray Gun: The original gun of the RGM-79 GM. A small beam handgun which shoots rapidly and has a fast recharge rate. It causes weak damage however. Unlockable through the "Extra Options" menu.

Beam Rifle: A high powered beam rifle. It can shoot 12 shots before having to reload. It has a slightly shorter reload time than the Prototype Beam Rifle. Unlockable through the "Extra Options" menu.

Head Vulcan: A secondary weapon that automatically recharges ammunition, but deals very little damage.

Beam Saber: A melee weapon, automatically activated when an enemy mobile suit closes in. It can take down an enemy suit with only a few swipes.

Hand Grenade: Common secondary weapon for the RGM-79. They deal damage comparable to a rocket.

Shoulder Cannon: This special weapon carries 16 rounds, and is found on the shoulders of the RGC-80 GM Cannon. They deal damage comparable to a rocket, and can be used with the scope to deal heavy damage to unaware enemy suits.

Shield (Large or Small): While technically not a weapon, activating thrusters and ramming an enemy suit with a small shield will deal damage and stagger both suits. Larger shields withstand more damage before being destroyed.

Premium Disc Weapons

G-Beam Rifle: The RX-78's beam rifle. It shoots 14 shots and has massive firepower, however its reload time is incredibly long. Unlockable via the Premium Disc's "Extra Options" menu.

Hyper Hammer: Another of the RX-78's weapons, this propels a giant spiked ball at a mobile suit. It has a small range however, but has no recharge or reload time. It can deal massive damage if the player can manage to strike their target. Unlockable via the Premium Disc's "Extra Options" menu.

== Premium disc ==
Released at about the same time as the original game, the Gundam 0079 Premium Disc was a special disc that could be ordered upon completion of the original Japanese version of Kidou Senshi Gundam Gaiden: Colony no Ochichita Chide.

It contained a small MS Simulator, which let the player battle against Amuro Ray in the RX-78 Gundam, as well as the RX-77 Guncannon, and RX-75 Guntank, from the original Mobile Suit Gundam animation. Upon completion, players were given a battle ranking, and could unlock certain things from the Extra Options menu.

The disc also includes a sound test option, missing from the original game, a gallery of MS artwork, and an Extra Options menu allowing the player to unlock special weapons, such as the Gundam's beam rifle, or hyper hammer.

This disc was never released in the United States, and will only work if the player possess an original completed save file from the Japanese version.

== Release ==
Mobile Suit Gundam 0079: Rise from the Ashes was developed by Bandai and published in Japan on August 26, 1999. It was later published in the United States on April 28, 2000. A "Bandai the Best" version was re-released on July 28, 2001.

This game was never released in Europe.

Originally developed as part of an ongoing story line meant stretch over the course of several games, but due to Dreamcast's short life no other entries were ever released.

It also received a T for Teen rating, by the ESRB.

== Reception ==
Reception

Review scores
Publication	Score
Electronic Gaming Monthly	7.5/10, 7.5/10, 7/10, 8/10
Game Informer	7.75/10

On release, Famitsu magazine scored the game a 32 out of 40.

== Sources ==
- http://www.gamefaqs.com/console/dreamcast/data/197508.html
- http://dreamcast.ign.com/objects/853/853099.html
