= Arcatera =

2000 video game

- Developer: Westka Interactive
- Publisher: Ubi Soft
- Platform: Microsoft Windows
- Release: EU: 2000; NA: August 2000
- Genre: Role-playing

Arcatera: The Dark Brotherhood is a role-playing game developed by German studio Westka Interactive and published by Ubi Soft in August 2000 for Windows.

== Plot and gameplay ==
The town of Senora has been taken over by the Dark Brotherhood, and it is the player's task to defeat the villains. Players explore the town, interact with characters, and gather information to advance the story. There are four available characters: a fighter, a thief, a magician, and a monk.

== Production ==
The concept and story was development for over 12 years, and it was Westka's first international video game project. A comic book based on the game was also released. The game was dubbed into the Polish language for a Polish release.

== Critical reception ==
Eurogamer said the game is confusing to play. while Ray Ivey of Just Adventure was impressed by the game at E3, he said he was very disappointed by the final result. Actiontrip praised the animations and settings. Evolver felt it had an "exciting, challenging background story". Mediabiz wrote Arcatera was a respectable game that showed that Germany was becoming a developer of impressive games. Jeuxvideo felt it was a success mix between the adventure and roleplaying genres. Gry Online decided that while the game had beautiful concept behind it, the final product was not attractive at all. Actiontrip noted that the music was simple and uninspired. GameCaptain felt the game's biggest problem was its persistent bugs.
