= Babel Rising =

2009 video game

- App icon on iTunes
- Developer: Mando Productions
- Publisher: Ubisoft
- Platforms: iPhone, iPod, iPad, PlayStation Network, Xbox Live Arcade, Android, Windows Phone 7, Windows Phone 8, Microsoft Windows, macOS, WiiWare
- Release: iOS; December 21, 2009; PSN/XBLA; June 13, 2012; Windows, macOS; August 7, 2012; Wiiware: EU: January 24, 2013
- Genre: Tower defense
- Mode: Single-player

Babel Rising is a video game developed by Mando Productions and produced by Michel Bams and Olivier Fontenay. An arcade game with short levels, the 2D version of the game was first published in 2009 and in 3D in 2012. Babel Rising 3D was published with Xbox achievements for Windows Phone 8 and Windows 8 in October 2013.

The storyline is based on the legend of the Tower of Babel, where God unleashes his wrath and powers against pagans who endeavor to build a tower to reach him. The goal is to stop them from ever reaching the skies. The player impersonates God and uses their powers to destroy the workers or the tower they are trying to build.

== Plot ==
The game is a fanciful adaptation of a biblical context. At the time of the construction of the city of Babylon, the humans erect a tower meant to reach the skies and they show such arrogance as to supposedly irritate God-the player.

The action takes place in an imaginary Babylon and uses various monuments and places associated to this civilization. The game does not take itself seriously and, as such, disregards historical facts. Workers can thus build the Tower of Babel, the Ishtar Gate, the Hanging Gardens of Babylon, but also more fanciful buildings such as a giant statue.

The characters in the game are the workers that the player must incessantly destroy whilst they carry on with the construction of the tower.

Depending on the version, the player may also face protector priests who will fend off her/his powers, or siege towers that the workers will have placed next to the tower.

The only named character in the series is King Nabu, and is a reference to Nebuchadnezzar II, famous for his building of Babylon. Nabu is portrayed as a secret tyrant, the most arrogant of all human beings, the man who issues the construction orders that anger the player. He is mentioned but never actually represented during the game, and the player never has the opportunity to eradicate him in person.

== Gameplay ==
The gameplay of Babel Rising mixes action and management of resources: the divine powers. The player has an array of powers that they may send at a chosen location, the only limitation being the recharging time for each power. The more the powers recharge, the more powerful they become; this generates tactical choices and forces players to take risks for maximum earnings.

If at first, it seems easy to destroy all the workers as they come closer, as the player progresses in the game, choosing the right moment to send each power becomes increasingly difficult. Sooner or later, the player will quite often be overwhelmed and the tower will rise slowly to game over.

Babel Rising uses a combo system to accrue higher scores. This allows for a longer game lifespan, by creating competition for first place. All the versions have online rankings, so as to compare scores with other players throughout the world.

The concept of Babel Rising is to stop the construction of the tower. Hence the goal is to survive as long as possible. The game also offers various missions with required conditions for victory, such as to eliminate a given amount of adversaries.

== Development ==
Babel Rising was originally a co-production of White Birds Productions studio and Exequo. White Birds Productions ceased to exist in December 2010 and Exequo carried through with the development of the game and of its sequels, in partnership with Mando Productions, who was in charge of creating and producing all the new versions of the game.

The initial version of Babel Rising iPhone was developed using tools internal to the development team at White Birds, some of which were specifically designed for the game itself. The ensuing versions were progressively centralized in a unique middleware, Shiva, developed by the firm Stonetrip. All developments were carried out by internal teams at Mando Productions and a few collaborators from the outside, using Shiva as the main engine.

Babel Rising 3D was also developed with Shiva, and produced in eight versions in parallel: XBLA, PSN, PC, Mac, IOS (iPhone and iPad), Android, Windows Phone 7 and Blackberry. The 2D version is available for 4 platforms: iPhone, Android, PC and WiiWare.

The original soundtrack was composed by Philippe Saisse.

== Reception ==
Reception

Aggregate scores
Aggregator	Score				
Aggregator	iOS	PC	PS3	Wii	Xbox 360
GameRankings	65%	N/A	58%	30%	53%
Metacritic	61/100	40/100	55/100	N/A	51/100

Review scores
Publication	Score				
Publication	iOS	PC	PS3	Wii	Xbox 360
Destructoid	N/A	N/A	N/A	N/A	5.5/10
Edge	N/A	N/A	N/A	N/A	3/10
Electronic Gaming Monthly	N/A	N/A	N/A	N/A	4/10
Eurogamer	5/10	N/A	4/10	N/A	N/A
GameSpot	N/A	N/A	N/A	N/A	6/10
GameZone	6/10	N/A	N/A	N/A	4/10
IGN	N/A	N/A	5/10	N/A	5/10
Nintendo Life	N/A	N/A	N/A	3/10	N/A
Official Xbox Magazine (US)	N/A	N/A	N/A	N/A	5.5/10
PlayStation: The Official Magazine	N/A	N/A	6/10	N/A	N/A
The Digital Fix	N/A	N/A	N/A	N/A	7/10

The iOS, PlayStation 3 and Xbox 360 versions received "mixed" reviews, while the PC version received "unfavorable" reviews, according to the review aggregation website Metacritic. It was criticized on several counts. The main reproach was the repetitive aspect of the game, but criticism also pointed at technical inaccuracies in the console version of Babel Rising 3D (Kinect and PS Move).

=== Sales ===
In July 2012, the Babel Rising license reached 2.5 million downloads, for all the versions of the game. In the following month, in the space of two weeks, Babel Rising 3D reaped an additional million downloads, thanks to the game's transition to Free-to-play on Google Play, bringing the total to over 3.5 million downloads.

The game Babel Rising was number one (free or paying version) in over 25 countries.
