= Voodoo Dice =

2010 video game

- Developer: Exkee
- Publisher: Ubisoft
- Platforms: iOS, PlayStation 3 and PlayStation Portable (PSN), Wii (WiiWare), Windows, Xbox 360 (XBLA)
- Release: May 26, 2010: Xbox 360; PAL: May 26, 2010; NA: May 26, 2010 PlayStation 3, PSP; PAL: May 26, 2010; NA: June 8, 2010 (PS3) Wii; AU: May 27, 2010; EU: May 28, 2010; NA: May 31, 2010 Windows; AU: June 11, 2010; NA: July 15, 2010 iOS; AU: June 15, 2010
- Genres: Action, puzzle
- Modes: Single-player, multiplayer

Voodoo Dice is an action puzzle game produced by French studio Exkee and distributed by Ubisoft on Xbox Live Arcade, PlayStation Network, and WiiWare. In Voodoo Dice, the player rolls dice through a path containing barriers, switches, conveyors and trap doors. The game consists of 60 single-player levels and 20 multiplayer levels. There are four multiplayer play modes (arcade, race mode, flag mode, tactic mode). In single-player mode, the player must finish each level within a set time limit in order to win achievements.

== Reception ==
Reception

Aggregate scores
Aggregator	Score
GameRankings	(iOS) 65% (X360) 61% (Wii) 56%
Metacritic	(PS3) 70/100 (X360) 61/100 (Wii) 52/100

Review scores
Publication	Score
Eurogamer	(X360) 8/10
GameSpot	(X360) 5.5/10
Gamezebo	(iOS) 3.5/5
IGN	5/10
Nintendo Life	(Wii) 6/10
Official Nintendo Magazine	(Wii) 52%
PlayStation Official Magazine – Australia	(PS3) 70%
Official Xbox Magazine (US)	(X360) 5.5/10
Pocket Gamer	(iOS) 3.5/5

The PlayStation 3, Wii, and Xbox 360 versions received "mixed or average reviews" according to the review aggregation website Metacritic.

Since its release, the Xbox 360 version sold 3,152 units worldwide as of January 2011. Sales had moved up to 5,576 units by the end of 2011.
