= Nutty Fluffies Rollercoaster =

2012 video game

- Developer: RedLynx
- Publisher: Ubisoft
- Platforms: iOS, Android
- Release: iOS; November 1, 2012; Android; February 26, 2013
- Genre: Side-scroller
- Mode: Single-player

Nutty Fluffies Rollercoaster, also known as simply Nutty Fluffies, is a side-scrolling video game developed by RedLynx and published by Ubisoft for iOS in 2012, and for Android in 2013.

== Reception ==
Reception

Aggregate score
| Aggregator | Score |
|---|---|
| Metacritic | 73/100 |

Review scores
| Publication | Score |
|---|---|
| Gamezebo | 4/5 |
| Hyper | 60% |
| Jeuxvideo.com | 17/20 |
| MacLife | 2.5/5 |
| Pocket Gamer | 3/5 |
| Digital Spy | 3/5 |

The iOS version received "mixed or average reviews" according to the review aggregation website Metacritic.
