= MotionSports =

2010 sports video game

- North American cover art
- Developer: Ubisoft Milan
- Publisher: Ubisoft
- Platform: Xbox 360
- Release: NA: November 4, 2010; EU: November 10, 2010; AU: November 18, 2010
- Genre: Sports
- Modes: Single-player, multiplayer

MotionSports is a sports video game developed by Ubisoft Milan and published by Ubisoft. The game was released on November 4, 2010, in North America, November 10, 2010, in Europe, and November 18, 2010, in Australia for the Xbox 360. It was one of the first games released for use with the Kinect sensor.

== Gameplay ==
MotionSports offers a wide range of sports experiences. Players can partake in activities like football, skiing, boxing, hang gliding, horseback riding, and soccer, controlling the action with their body movements. The game features both single-player and multiplayer modes for competing against AI or friends.

Each sport in MotionSports requires players to perform realistic movements. For instance, boxing involves throwing punches and dodging, while skiing mimics downhill motions. The Kinect sensor accurately tracks these movements, providing responsive controls. MotionSports emphasizes physical activity and skill development, rewarding precision and timing.

With its focus on diverse sports and motion-based controls, MotionSports appeals to players of various ages and interests. Whether facing AI opponents or competing with friends, the game aims to provide an active virtual sports experience, encouraging players to enjoy the physicality facilitated by the Kinect technology.

== Reception ==
Reception

Aggregate score
Aggregator	Score
Metacritic	40/100

Review scores
Publication	Score
Eurogamer	3/10
GameRevolution	D
GamesMaster	4/10
GameSpot	3.5/10
GamesRadar+	2/5
GameTrailers	4.1/10
GameZone	4/10
IGN	4.5/10
Official Xbox Magazine (UK)	5/10
Official Xbox Magazine (US)	3.5/10
PALGN	6/10
VideoGamer.com	4/10
Gamereactor	4/10
Metro	2/10

MotionSports received "generally unfavorable" reviews according to review aggregator Metacritic.

Ronan Jennings for Eurogamer rated the game 3/10, stating that "hopefully this is the last we'll see of the human d-pad experiment. I spend enough time under the thumb as it is."

GamesRadar+ rated the game 2 stars, stating that "if your biggest complaint about previous such entries is that they didn't include horseback riding, hang gliding or skiing, then MotionSports might get you in front of the TV for a weekend of flawed fun. Otherwise, we suggest leaving this one on the sidelines."

Ryan Clements for IGN rated the game 4.5/10, stating that "MotionSports is not a strong launch title for Kinect. Its inconsistent controls, poor interface, and general lack of polish keep it from being the entertaining mini-game collection it could have been. I highly recommend that gamers looking for a sports compilation go with Kinect Sports, which is far superior in its controls and interface."

The Official Xbox Magazine (US) rated the game 3.5/10, stating that you should "Spend your $50 on something--anything--else," whereas the Official Xbox Magazine (UK) rated the game 5/10, similar to IGN's review, stated that "You'd do better to get Kinect Sports instead."

Vandal rated the game 4/10, stating that "MotionSports may have been born as a good idea to take advantage of the possibilities of Kinect by offering us a varied set of tests that would invite us to progress and unlock new challenges, but the truth is that neither how they ended up developing the idea nor the implementation of the control works."

== Sequel ==
MotionSports Adrenaline, a sequel to MotionSports, released on October 27, 2011 for the Xbox 360 and on November 10, 2011 for the PlayStation 3. The game was also developed and published by Ubisoft. The game also received "generally unfavorable" reviews according to review aggregator Metacritic.
