= James Noir's Hollywood Crimes =

2011 video game

- Developer: Ubisoft Montreal
- Publisher: Ubisoft
- Platforms: Nintendo 3DS, iOS
- Release: Nintendo 3DS: NA: November 1, 2011; AU: November 24, 2011; EU: November 25, 2011; iOS; June 21, 2012
- Genre: Puzzle

James Noir's Hollywood Crimes (known in Europe as James Noir's Hollywood Crimes 3D) is a puzzle game developed by Ubisoft for the Nintendo 3DS and iOS. The game is set within a TV game show in the 1960s and the player must solve puzzles to defeat a mysterious criminal mastermind. The player takes on the role of a contestant working their way through 6 stages of a game show as Hollywood becomes the staging ground for a set of gruesome crimes. The game stars Elias Toufexis who played Adam Jensen in Deus Ex: Human Revolution.

== Reception ==
Reception

Aggregate score
Aggregator	Score
Metacritic	60/100

Review scores
Publication	Score
Adventure Gamers	2.5/5
GamesMaster	78%
GameSpot	7/10
GamesTM	3/10
NGamer	62%
Nintendo Life	7/10
Nintendo Power	5/10
Nintendo World Report	7.5/10
Official Nintendo Magazine	76%
PALGN	6/10
Pocket Gamer	(iOS) 3/5
The Digital Fix	3/10
Metro	5/10

The game received "mixed" reviews on both platforms according to the review aggregation website Metacritic.
