= Sandstorm: Pirate Wars =

2016 video game

- Developer: Ubisoft Barcelona
- Publisher: Ubisoft
- Platforms: Android, iOS
- Release: NA: January 28, 2016
- Genre: Action game
- Modes: Single-player, multiplayer

Sandstorm: Pirate Wars is an action video game developed by Ubisoft Barcelona and published by Ubisoft. It was released for Android and iOS in North America on January 28, 2016.

== Gameplay ==
Two game modes are included: story mode and sand mode. In the story mode, the goal is to take out other ships along the way and pick up resources whenever possible by travelling between areas in the sand-cruiser. Sand mode represents player versus player battles with online matchmaking. There is a base, where the player can upgrade or customize the cruiser, before going to a map and choosing where to go next. While travelling, events will come up, including ruins explorations, helping civilians, or threats from the enemies. Some responses will give bolts and others will put the player into a battle.

Pirate Wars consists of real-time air battles against other sand-cruisers with dynamic camera. They are entirely tactical, which means the player is able to decide which weapon or defense type to opt for at any time. The player can choose and attack a specific ship element. The duel is won by destroying the equipment of the rival's sand-cruiser or by decreasing its health bar to zero. Every attack type has its own properties, which forces a diversification of the setup to be as more effective as possible against the rivals. Meanwhile, the defense is installed in the bottom of the ship with objects that can send decoys or shields that will reduce the incoming damage.

== Reception ==
Reception

Review scores
Publication	Score
Gamezebo	3.5/5
IGN	6.5/10
Jeuxvideo.com	10/20
Pocket Gamer	3.5/5
