= MotionSports Adrenaline =

2011 video game

- Xbox 360 version's North American cover art
- Developer: Ubisoft Milan
- Publisher: Ubisoft
- Platforms: Xbox 360; PlayStation 3
- Release: Xbox 360: EU: October 27, 2011; NA: November 1, 2011; PlayStation 3: WW: November 10, 2011
- Genre: Sports
- Modes: Single-player, multiplayer

MotionSports Adrenaline is a sports racing video game developed by Ubisoft Milan and published by Ubisoft. The game was released on October 27, 2011, in Europe, and November 1, 2011, in North America for the Xbox 360, and November 10, 2011, for the PlayStation 3. The game is the sequel to MotionSports.

== Gameplay ==
Promotional material for the mountain biking game mode

MotionSports Adrenaline offers six sporting events: rock climbing, kayaking, kite surfing, mountain biking, wingsuit skydiving, and the return of skiing from the previous game. Each sport has the same race objective where the player completes a given course in as little time as possible while collecting coin pieces that are scattered throughout the course. To increase the player's score, certain onscreen stunt markers appear. These typically direct the player to throw their arms or legs in a particular direction and mimic the image on the screen.

In MotionSports Adrenaline, there are three game modes, those being the single-player, multiplayer, and quick play modes, providing opportunities for solo challenges or competitive experiences with friends. The more the user plays a particular activity, the more courses and boosts for the game's cast of characters become available. Each sport has two or three courses available.

== Reception ==
Reception

Aggregate score
Aggregator	Score	
Aggregator	PS3	Xbox 360
Metacritic	35/100	41/100

Review scores
Publication	Score	
Publication	PS3	Xbox 360
Electronic Gaming Monthly	N/A	3/10
GameSpot	N/A	2.5/10
GameZone	N/A	2/10
IGN	N/A	4/10
Jeuxvideo.com	N/A	11/20
Push Square	4/10	N/A

MotionSports Adrenaline received "generally unfavorable" reviews according to review aggregator Metacritic.

Electronic Gaming Monthly rated the game 3/10, stating that the "Kinect offers a few worthwhile casual-gaming experiences—but this isn't one of them." GameSpot rated the game 2.5/10, stating that "MotionSports Adrenaline is a mess."

In their review, GameZone stated that "Chalk up another stinker for Kinect. Like Blackwater and Hulk Hogan's Main Event, MotionSports Adrenaline serves no purpose whatsoever, with its laggy gameplay, lame sports, lacking modes, Uplay limitations, and boring presentation. You're better off playing a game seeing who can chuck this back onto the store shelf the quickest."

Peter Eykemans for IGN rated the game 4/10, stating that "while the subject matter is full of exciting potential, the imprecise controls and repetitive movements across events keep MotionSports Adrenaline from becoming a hit. Compounded with the lack of real punishment or consequences, MotionSports Adrenaline simply fails to leave a lasting mark on the motion-game scene."

Jeuxvideo.com rated the game 11/20, stating that "MotionSports Adrenaline surprises with its exemplary production but the software also offers uneven gameplay and rickety content. In short, in the end, the game seems a little expensive given that it will only take a good hour to play through it."

Christopher Ingram for Push Square, like IGN's review, rated the game 4/10, stating that "MotionSports Adrenaline tries to bring a unique control interface to Move that can compare with what's found on Kinect, but while there's some potential to be had here, the overall experience is nowhere near as exciting as any of these sports are in real life."
