= I Am Alive =

2012 video game

- Developers: Darkworks (2005–2009); Ubisoft Shanghai (2009–2012)
- Publisher: Ubisoft (Note: Published on GOG.com by Atari)
- Director: Stanislas Mettra
- Producer: Sergei Titarenko
- Designer: David Maurin
- Programmer: Yann Courties
- Artist: Liao Jun Hao
- Writer: Jess Lebow
- Composer: Jeff Broadbent
- Engine: Unreal Engine 2
- Platforms: PlayStation 3; Windows; Xbox 360
- Release: Xbox 360: WW: March 7, 2012; PlayStation 3: NA: April 3, 2012; EU: April 4, 2012; Microsoft Windows: WW: September 6, 2012
- Genres: Action-adventure, survival
- Mode: Single-player

I Am Alive is a 2012 action-adventure survival game set in a post-apocalyptic world. Developed by Ubisoft Shanghai and published by Ubisoft, it was released for Xbox 360 (via Xbox Live Arcade) in March 2012, for PlayStation 3 (via the PlayStation Network) in April, and for Windows (via Steam and UPlay) in September.

The game takes place one year after "The Event", a cataclysmic disaster that has wiped out most of humanity and reduced cities to rubble. The unnamed protagonist returns to his home in the fictional city of Haventon looking for his wife and daughter. He later encounters a young girl looking for her lost mother, and the protagonist vows to help find her.

I Am Alive was initially in development by Darkworks from 2005 to 2009, and was conceived as a first-person game called Alive. It was postponed and re-announced multiple times over its seven-year development cycle. Ubisoft Shanghai restarted development from scratch until its completion in 2012, keeping only the original pitch and the gameplay designs, minus the combat. Inspired by films such as The Road and The Book of Eli, the developers wanted players to experience the emotions and moral quandaries of choosing who lives and who dies. The scope of the game was originally planned as a full retail release, but was eventually released as a digital-only title.

I Am Alive received mixed reviews. Praise was directed at its tone, graphics, combat, climbing mechanics, and the moral choices presented in the gameplay. Criticisms tended to focus on the combat and intimidation system as repetitive and undeveloped. The game topped the charts for Xbox Live and PlayStation Network for several weeks after its release, and became one of the top-ten selling games of 2012 on both networks. Atari SA acquired the IP from Ubisoft in 2025. It was released on GOG.com and added to its Preservation Program on November 25, 2025.

== Gameplay ==
I Am Alive is an action-adventure survival game, in which the player controls the unnamed protagonist from a third-person perspective, although the camera switches to first-person when aiming and shooting.

The game features an emphasis on climbing, which is governed by a stamina meter, whereby physically demanding activities, such as jumping or running exert stamina and drain the meter. Once the protagonist's feet are off the ground, everything exerts stamina, even hanging motionless. Some actions exert more stamina than others - for example, jumping from one beam to another when climbing uses a lot more stamina than shimmying across a beam. The stamina meter refills automatically when the player is on solid ground, unless the protagonist is outside at ground level, where the dust in the air constantly depletes the stamina meter, and eventually the health meter. If the player runs out of stamina when climbing, they are allowed a few seconds for a final exertion to try to get to solid ground. However, such exertion results in a piece of the stamina meter itself disappearing (thus reducing the maximum stamina the player can have going forward). This loss can only be restored by using a specific item. To aid in climbing, the player can use pitons, which allow the protagonist to rest and recharge his stamina mid-climb. Each piton can only be used in a single location; once they are placed into a wall, they cannot be removed.

Screenshot from I Am Alive showing the protagonist attempting to lure an armed enemy in for a quick kill. By raising his hands, he can fool enemies into thinking he has surrendered, and when they get close, he can cut their throat with his machete.

Hostile encounters are another prominent part of gameplay. When the protagonist is confronted by a group of hostiles, there are various strategies available, depending on how the group acts. He can surprise a single enemy with a machete quick kill, engage in melee combat with a single enemy at a time, draw his gun and attempt to intimidate the enemies into surrendering (irrespective of whether or not he has ammo), or actually fire his gun (or bow), killing one enemy in the hopes the others will surrender. When an enemy has surrendered, the player has the option of either knocking them out or pushing them off a ledge or into a fire (if available at the location). The player must always keep a lookout for the group's leader (usually the most talkative member of the group), and attempt to kill him first, as this will often compel the others to surrender. On the other hand, killing a weaker group member will cause a group leader to immediately attack. If the protagonist aims his gun at enemies for too long without doing anything, they will become convinced he is bluffing and attack.

The player must collect resources and supplies scattered throughout the city, including items such as water, food, gas, medicine, and ammo. These items can be used to replenish the player's health and stamina, and often restore the maximum size of the stamina bar. Resources such as cigarettes and alcohol have a negative effect on the player's stats and are instead intended for use in side missions. As the player encounters non-hostile survivors, they will make requests for various items. When the player gives them the required item, the player will receive a single retry, and the survivor will fill some of the game's backstory.

The game saves automatically at checkpoints, but if the player dies during combat or climbing, they can use a retry, which allows them to return to the specific area where they died without having to go back to the previous checkpoint. Retries are scarce, however, and can only be obtained by finding them in the game world or by completing sidequests. If the player dies without any retries in their inventory, they are forced to return to the previous checkpoint, which is oftentimes right at the start of a level.

== Plot ==
The game takes place a year after a catastrophic disaster known as "The Event" wiped out 90% of the human race. The cataclysm continues to make itself felt by way of aftershocks and the toxic dust that hangs permanently within the half-collapsed cities. In the weeks and months after The Event, resource shortages quickly became peoples' biggest problem, a situation that has only gotten worse as time has passed. As the game begins, society has broken down into small pockets of survivors, some of whom want only to protect what meagre resources they have, whereas others are out to get everything they can. No matter their agenda, however, everyone is on guard and on edge, and everyone is capable of violence.

The game opens with an unnamed man arriving in his home city of Haventon, hoping to find his wife, Julie, and daughter, Mary, whom he last saw just before The Event. Recording updates via a video camera, which are being watched by an unidentified person at some point in the future, he explains it took him almost a year to walk back to Haventon from "out east". When he gets to his apartment, he finds a note written by Julie in which she explains that she and Mary left shortly after The Event, hoping to make it to one of the emergency camps. She also tells him that she forgives him for everything.

As he is leaving the apartment, he sees a small girl who he initially mistakes for Mary, before saving her from three hostile men. The girl, Mei, tells him that her mother went missing on a supply run and she gives him a walkie-talkie with which to speak to Henry, Mei's family friend. Upon arriving at Henry's apartment, Henry thanks the protagonist for protecting Mei and asks him to retrieve a radio transmitter. Henry himself is unable to get it as he is disabled.

Traversing the deadly dust clouds, the protagonist is able to retrieve the transmitter. Back in the apartment, Henry tells him that Mei's mother is in a local hotel, held against her will, and asks him to save her. Fighting his way through gang members who take women prisoner and force them to provide sexual gratification, he finds and rescues Mei's mother, Linda. On the way back to Henry's, she says that Henry used to oversee the dispatch and communications systems of the Haventon Fire Department, and will probably know the locations of all the emergency camps in the city.

At Henry's, Linda and Mei are reunited, and Linda is able to use the radio to pick up a broadcast from a ship en route to Haventon to collect survivors. However, it can't dock because of the heavy dust. Henry says they need to create a beacon to guide the boat in by using fireworks. The protagonist takes the fireworks to the roof of the tallest building in the city, where he successfully ignites them. However, upon returning to the apartment, he finds Henry, Linda, and Mei gone. Outside, he encounters Linda, who tells him that men came and took Mei. Henry pursued them, but he didn't return. The protagonist finds Henry's wheelchair and learns from an injured man that Henry was taken by the gang, who wanted to learn what he knew about the camps. Eventually, the protagonist finds Mei, and the beacon successfully guides the ship into the harbour.

Mei and Linda get aboard but the protagonist decides to stay, still hoping to find Julie and Mary, and maybe Henry. Mei and Linda bid him farewell and he records his last tape, vowing that he will find his family no matter what and apologizing to Julie, promising her that he will find a way to "make it up". It is then revealed that the person watching the tapes is a young woman. As the protagonist vows to find Julie and Mary, the woman begins to cry, and we see that all of the protagonist's gear is on a nearby table.

== Development ==
=== Darkworks (2005–2009) ===
The game was first mentioned on September 3, 2006, in an article on how to get more women involved with playing video games in the International Herald Tribune. In the article, Ubisoft's Chief Executive, Yves Guillemot, stated, "next year, Ubisoft will publish a game called Alive that features characters who rely on their instincts and each other to endure after an earthquake." Nothing more was heard about the game until July 2008, when Gamekyo reported that Assassin's Creed producer and co-creator Jade Raymond was producing what was now called I Am Alive. According to the article, the game was a first-person "survival-adventure" set in a post-apocalyptic Chicago. Developed by Darkworks for PlayStation 3, Microsoft Windows, and Xbox 360, it had originally gone into production in 2005 and was now scheduled for a second quarter 2009 release. When asked about Raymond's involvement, Ubisoft declined to comment.

At E3 the following week, Ubisoft formally unveiled a CGI trailer showcasing the game's post-apocalyptic setting and introducing the protagonist, Adam Collins. Guillemot stated that the game "will appeal to anyone that enjoys a thrilling journey. It will offer a rich palette of emotions while challenging players to make life-changing decisions." In August, Ubisoft executive director, Alain Corre told MCV that there were hopes the game could launch a new franchise; "we hope it can be another strong franchise for our portfolio, alongside Prince of Persia or Rayman Rabbids. It's a new baby for us – and we have big hopes."

In January 2009, Ubisoft confirmed that Raymond was not working on the title in any capacity, with Alexis Goddard serving as senior producer. She explained that the game would feature violence only as a last resort, and "we wanted the player to really feel the power of Mother Nature, to feel the danger coming from the collapsing towers and devastating rifts, feel the chaos happening all around him. There's nothing like a first-person view to create that kind of emotion." The game was now slated for release in March of that year. However, the following day, Ubisoft published a release schedule for the remainder of the fiscal year that did not include I Am Alive. They attributed its absence to the fact that it "will require further development time and will now bolster the line-up for 2009-10."

In March, Ubisoft announced that Darkworks were no longer working on the game, due to the changes in the release schedule; "in order to respect the new launch date for this ambitious title, and Darkworks having other obligations, we have mutually decided to complete development of I Am Alive at Ubisoft Shanghai, as the two studios have collaborated on aspects of the title over the past year. The team at Darkworks has respected its contractual obligations on the project and will be a part of the success of the game when it launches."

=== Ubisoft Shanghai (2009–2012) ===
In May 2009, Ubisoft confirmed that the game was scheduled for a January-March 2010 release. However, in July, in their 2009-2010 Q1 fiscal year report, they announced that it had been pushed back to the fiscal year 2010-2011, meaning an April 2010 release at the earliest. Little more was heard about the game until January 2010, when it was pushed back even further - to the fiscal year 2011-2012, meaning an April 2011 release at the earliest. In a conference call, Guillemot stated, "we have been totally re-engineering the product, so it is still on the way." In May 2011, after Ubisoft announced it had cancelled a number of planned titles as part of an internal restructuring exercise, Eurogamer reached out to the company and were assured that both I Am Alive and Beyond Good and Evil 2 were still very much in development, although they also stated, "we have nothing new to report on those two titles for the moment."

In June, PlayStationLifeStyle noted that the game had been listed by the Australian Classification Board, rated 15+ for "strong violence". It was then rated by the ESRB in September, suggesting a release was imminent. Rated as "Mature", according to the ESRB's report, the game "is an action game in which players assume the role of a man who must find his family in a post-apocalyptic world. From a third-person perspective, players traverse through city ruins and use a machete to kill human enemies in melee-style combat." This was the first reference to the game being third-person; up to this point, it was still thought to be first-person.

A few days later, Ubisoft released a new trailer, which looked radically different from that shown at E3 2008. In this new iteration of the game, the story is set in the fictional city of Haventon rather than Chicago, and the main character is no longer named Adam Collins, instead, he is unnamed. Ubisoft also revealed that the game would be digital-only, and was scheduled for release on the PlayStation Network and Xbox Live Arcade "this winter"; "Xbox Live Arcade and PlayStation Network are the perfect platforms to leverage the mature and challenging experiences of the game." They also stated that the previously announced PC version had been cancelled, although they offered no information as to why.

In November, Ubisoft began releasing gameplay clips and giving interviews to game journalists. Speaking to Eurogamer, Ubisoft Shanghai's director of business and marketing, Aurélien Palasse, said that when Ubisoft took over the project from Darkworks, they essentially started development from scratch; "it arrived in Shanghai in 2010, and we decided to make it more realistic. We started from scratch, but with the same pitch." Speaking to Digital Spy, creative director Stanislas Mettra echoed these comments;

what happened is that we made two games. The first one was almost finished and almost developed fully. The thing is, it was based on the pitch that was communicated, set in Chicago, all this stuff, and the game was produced and considered somehow disappointing according to Ubisoft's standards. We know there were really high expectations to create a unique game experience, but the first version of the game had an interesting concept but the game systems were not entertaining enough, they didn't work enough. When we hear about games like that, often, we hear about new game creations that take a long time, which usually means that there's not one game that's been made, but one, two, three, sometimes we get the second or third or fourth version, and that's what happened here. This is basically the second version, especially designed for XBLA and PSN in mind [sic].

Speaking of the reaction to the first iteration of the game, he explained, "the top management decided to not release it, they even considered to cancel the whole thing, but we proposed the idea of going XBLA, propose really something really [sic] new and different, redo the levels as they have to be, and present this."

Meanwhile, speaking to IncGamers about the decision to abandon the PC version of the game, Mettra explained that the main reason for doing so was the financial cost of piracy; "there's so much piracy and so few people are paying for PC games that we have to precisely weigh it up against the cost of making it. Perhaps it will only take 12 guys three months to port the game to PC, it's not a massive cost but it's still a cost. If only 50,000 people buy the game then it's not worth it." However, some of his comments received considerable backlash, especially, "we've heard loud and clear that PC gamers are bitching about there being no version for them. But are these people just making noise just because there's no version or because it's a game they actually want to play?" The following day, he sent IncGamers a follow-up email, in which he said he had misspoken; "I don't think I meant to say "the game won't happen on pc [...] What I meant is that the pc version did not happen yet. But we are still working to see the feasibility of it, which is not necessarily simple. I gave some examples to illustrate the problematic [sic], but obviously it is not in my hands and not my part to talk about this."

In January 2012, Ubisoft confirmed that the Xbox Live version would join Alan Wake's American Nightmare, Nexuiz, and Warp as part of the "Xbox Live Arcade House Party" event, which would run from February 15 to March 7, with a game released each week. The day before the game went live on XBLA, an iOS companion app was released on the App Store, featuring maps of the game's locations, hints and tips, an Achievement checklist, information on the effects of each type of resource, concept art, the game's soundtrack, trailers, a short making-of documentary, and a photo filter. Two weeks after the release of the Xbox version, Ubisoft announced the PlayStation version would be made available in April. In August, it was announced that the once-cancelled PC version would release on Steam and UPlay in September. This version would feature improved graphics with higher resolutions and two new modes of play - an "Easy" difficulty offering infinite retries and a "Replay" mode allowing players to replay any completed levels at any time. Atari SA acquired the IP from Ubisoft in 2025.

=== Genre ===
Conceptually, from its very inception, the game was geared towards avoiding violence when possible. When speaking to the International Herald Tribune in 2006, Guillemot stated, "it reflects the company's focus on an "action plus" style. It's more oriented toward drama, more life in characters, more depth. It's still about surviving, but you can't resolve things by shooting only." At E3 in 2008, he said that "players will be challenged to think, react and take risks that will directly affect themselves and those around them." When the game was re-announced in September 2011, an Ubisoft press release stated, "I Am Alive presents a unique take on the post-apocalyptic, survival genre by creating more complex and emotional situations for the player." Speaking to GameSpot in January 2012, Aurélien Palasse said, "I Am Alive is the opposite of gaming's postapocalyptic power fantasy. Post-disaster [in games] is often unrealistic, and I Am Alive is realistic. I think it's different from all the other games we've seen: it's more mature; everything is real." He cited films such as The Road and The Book of Eli as specific inspirations.

Speaking to VentureBeat at CES in January 2012, Mettra said of the game, "we wanted to focus the experience on something human-centric, and that's why there's no zombies, no monsters. It's really about the human condition." He emphasised that the game is not about shooting hundreds of enemies or engaging in mindless combat; "when you're surrounded by a group of bad guys, it's always important to assess the situation and see who's the most dangerous - if someone is carrying a weapon, some might have a gun, some might have a machete, you need to take down the one with the gun first." Speaking of the importance of the stamina bar, Palasse reiterated, "you're not a superhero." In a "making of" video released in January 2012, Mettra further explains, "the premise of this game calls for something different and it forced us to rethink a lot of the traditional mechanics that we have in survival games."

== Reception ==
Reception

Aggregate score
Aggregator	Score		
Aggregator	PC	PS3	Xbox 360
Metacritic	66/100	75/100	69/100

Review scores
Publication	Score		
Publication	PC	PS3	Xbox 360
Destructoid			8.5/10
Eurogamer			8/10
Game Informer			8.5/10
GameSpot		8/10	8/10
IGN			4.5/10
PlayStation Official Magazine – Australia		9/10	
PlayStation Official Magazine – UK		7/10	
Official Xbox Magazine (UK)			7/10
Official Xbox Magazine (US)			7.5/10
PC Gamer (US)	73%		

The PlayStation 3 version of I Am Alive received "generally favorable reviews", holding an aggregate score of 75 out of 100 on Metacritic, based on fifteen reviews. The PC and Xbox 360 versions received "mixed or average" reviews, with scores of 66 out of 100 from ten reviews, and 69 out of 100 from sixty-eight reviews.

Writing for Australia's PlayStation Official Magazine, Clint McCreadie scored the PlayStation 3 version 9 out of 10, praising the core game mechanics and highlighting the psychological discomfort one feels when playing. He wrote, "rare is the game that packs in this much originality, pulse-racing action, and palpable pride at overcoming serious challenges," and he concluded by calling it "an original and satisfying challenge. A breath of fresh air." Destructoid's Maurice Tan scored the Xbox 360 version 8.5 out of 10, praising the climbing, combat, tone, and management of morality. His one major criticism was that combat never gives the player a non-violent solution, arguing that "the lack of a penalty for killing [enemies] eliminates any moral compass the game carefully tries to construct." Nevertheless, he concluded, "I Am Alive is a remarkable accomplishment. Not only does it create an atmospheric world that feels real enough to identify with, but it succeeds at delivering a unique experience geared towards an adult audience while simultaneously being a fun game to play."

Game Informer's Tim Turi scored the Xbox 360 version 8.5 out of 10, praising the combat, climbing, side missions, and tone, and calling it "one of the most memorable survival games I've ever played." Eurogamer's Tom Bramwell scored it 8 out of 10, praising the tone, gameplay, and the moral element of the side-missions. His main criticism was that the combat and intimidation systems never develop or become any more complicated or in-depth than how they are first introduced.

GameSpot's Tom McShea scored the PlayStation 3 and Xbox 360 versions 8 out of 10, writing, "I Am Alive is so effective because it removes many artificial barriers and forces you to make intimate and emotional decisions." He particularly praised the psychological component of the combat system, the atmosphere, tone, and how it draws the player in emotionally, calling it "an engrossing experience that's difficult to forget." PC Gamer's Julian Benson scored the PC version 73%, feeling that combat was repetitive; "you must repeat the same encounter many times, always following the same routine: surprise kill, shoot, ledge kick." However, he praised how well realised Haventon felt and the general tone and atmosphere. He concluded, "it falls just short of being satisfying."

Writing for the US's Official Xbox Magazine, Corey Cohen scored the Xbox 360 version 7.5 out of 10, calling it "an absorbing action/adventure, if one that doesn't quite match its creators' ambitions." He lauded how the art style and graphics mirrored the game's dark theme and tone, but he criticised the save and retry system, finding it "overly convoluted." Writing for the UK's edition, Edwin Evans-Thirlwell scored the game 7 out of 10, calling it "occasionally brilliant." He found the intimidation system to be "a clunky and repetitive business" and called the stamina meter "irritating". Nevertheless, he acknowledged that at times, the game was exceptionally well put together. Writing for the UK's PlayStation Official Magazine, Joel Gregory scored the PlayStation 3 version 7 out of 10. He found combat to be repetitive, but he also argued that "this is a survival game that gets way more right than wrong." He was particularly impressed with how well-crafted the game world was. He concluded, "that a game with such a troubled development has turned out so well is impressive."

IGN's Greg Miller scored the Xbox 360 version 4.5 out of 10, criticising the graphics and gameplay and calling the game "a cumbersome, frustrating mess." He argued that it fails to create any emotional stakes because "there's no impact to the deaths," and he concluded by calling it "a flat, frustrating game that isn't worth your time or money." Two weeks later, after his review generated negative feedback, Miller had other members of staff write short reviews. Keza MacDonald called it "thematically brilliant but mechanically unsatisfying". Eric Neigher criticised the "clunky combat, brutal, learn-by-dying scenes, and a general lack of polish." Steven Hopper found it to be "an incomplete experience that doesn't quite work." Peter Eykemans called it "a good idea and a bad game," finding it buggy and poorly paced. Destin Legarie stated, "I would highly recommend that you pass on the entire experience."

=== Sales ===
During the first three weeks of release, I Am Alive was the top selling game on Xbox Live Arcade. It was ultimately the eighth best-selling 2012 title on XBLA. On the PlayStation Network, it was the top selling title for April 2012. In both May and June, it was the fourth top-selling title. It remained in the top-ten until April 2013.
