= Dance on Broadway =

2010 video game

- European Wii box art
- Developer: Longtail Studios
- Publisher: Ubisoft
- Engine: Gamebryo
- Platforms: Wii, PlayStation 3
- Release: Wii: NA: June 15, 2010; AU: June 24, 2010; EU: July 2, 2010; PlayStation 3: NA: March 17, 2011; EU: March 18, 2011; AU: March 24, 2011
- Genres: Music, Rhythm
- Modes: Single player, multiplayer

Dance on Broadway is a 2010 rhythm game for the Wii and PlayStation 3. Published by Ubisoft, the creators of Just Dance, Dance on Broadway is similarly a dance-based music game but with songs taken from stage musicals rather than popular music. In addition, it is a spinoff of the Just Dance franchise.

== Gameplay ==
Gameplay during the "Aquarius/Sunshine medley."

The game has one main game mode, in which players can choose from any of the game's 20 tracks and attempt - singularly or with up to three additional players - to follow the on-screen dancers and instructions using the Wii Remote or up to two PlayStation Move motion controllers. Most songs feature all players performing the same moves in synch with one another, but some involve individual steps for certain players; e.g. in "My Favourite Things", one player takes on the role of Maria von Trapp, doing different steps from the others, who play as three of the von Trapp children. Different steps for different players are represented through the use of different-colored silhouettes and on-screen dancers.

Players are scored on how closely their actions follow the actions on-screen and on how many consecutive successful moves they make. The game features the same judgements from the original Just Dance. A progress bar displays the players' points throughout the song and a winner is revealed at the end of each track.

The Wii version can accommodate up to four players, while the PS3 version can accommodate up to two players.

== Song list ==
The game includes 20 showtunes. Note that the following are from the Wii version.

Song title	Artist	Show	Year
"All That Jazz"	Velma Kelly	Chicago	1975
"Aquarius/Let the Sunshine In"	The 5th Dimension	Hair	1969
"Bend & Snap"	Cast of Legally Blonde	Legally Blonde	2008
"Cabaret"	Cast of Cabaret	Cabaret	1972
"Dreamgirls"	Cast of Dreamgirls	Dreamgirls	1981
"Fame"	Irene Cara	Fame	1980
"Good Morning Baltimore"	Cast of Hairspray	Hairspray	2002
"I Just Can't Wait to Be King"	Cast of Disney's The Lion King	Disney's The Lion King	1994
"Little Shop of Horrors"	Cast of Little Shop of Horrors	Little Shop of Horrors	1982
"Luck Be a Lady"	Robert Alda	Guys and Dolls	1950
"Lullaby of Broadway"	Wini Shaw	Gold Diggers of 1935	1935
"Money, Money"	Cast of Cabaret	Cabaret	1972
"My Favorite Things"	Julie Andrews	The Sound of Music	1959
"One Night Only"	Cast of Dreamgirls	Dreamgirls	1981
"Roxie"	Roxie Hart	Chicago	1975
"Supercalifragilisticexpialidocious"	Cast of Disney's Mary Poppins	Disney's Mary Poppins	1964
"Thoroughly Modern Millie"	Cast of Thoroughly Modern Millie	Thoroughly Modern Millie	1967
"Time Warp"	Cast of The Rocky Horror Picture Show	The Rocky Horror Show	1975
"We're in the Money"	Ginger Rogers	Gold Diggers of 1933	1933
"You Can't Stop the Beat"	Cast of Hairspray	Hairspray	2002

== Reception ==
Reception

Aggregate scores
Aggregator	Score
GameRankings	(Wii) 48% (PS3) 30%
Metacritic	(Wii) 48/100

Review scores
Publication	Score
GameSpot	(Wii) 4/10
NGamer	(Wii) 37%
Official Nintendo Magazine	(Wii) 48%
Push Square	(PS3) 3/10
The Telegraph	(Wii) 6/10
The Guardian	(Wii) 2/5
Common Sense Media	(Wii) 2/5

The Wii version received "generally unfavorable reviews" according to the review aggregation website Metacritic. The site gave it a score of 48 out of 100.

The Observer called "the short, 20 song line-up...disappointing" and complained that the Wii version's motion-tracking "fails miserably", but conceded that this flaw "doesn't detract from the fun of the game in the slightest." GameFocus criticized the absence of a career mode, saying that said console version is "lacking in terms of a sense of progression and/or accomplishment" but called it as an easy-to-pick-up game for younger players.

The Daily Telegraph gave the same Wii version a score of six out of ten and said that the controls were "a little ropy and its depth severely lacking, but these aren't concerns that will trouble the audience it's aimed at. Not only that, but it's tremendous entertainment value. Just ask my other half. She hasn't laughed this much in ages." However, The Guardian gave it a score of two stars out of five and said that it "will appeal to fans of Just Dance, of show tunes, and of games that provide an excuse to get up and throw yourself around your front room. Lyrics are displayed during the songs to allow players to sing along and as a party game it will provide plenty of cheap giggles. Some people will love it. And they knew they would from the moment they saw the title." Common Sense Media gave the same console version two stars out of five and said it was "noteworthy for the fact that it celebrates Broadway music -- something not many games can say – but it is not a worthwhile gaming experience."
