= Tom Salta =

Tom Salta (Atlas Plug)
- Born: Norwalk, Connecticut, U.S.
- Genres: Breakbeat, dance, electronic, orchestral
- Occupations: Recording artist, composer
- Label: FiXT Music
- Website: tomsalta.com www.atlasplug.com

Tom Salta, also known as Atlas Plug, is an American recording artist and soundtrack composer. Salta's score for Red Steel received an award for "Best Original Score" in IGN's Best of 2006 awards.

== Video games ==
| Year | Title | Developer | Publisher |
| 2023 | The Outlast Trials | Red Barrels | Red Barrels |
| 2021 | Deathloop | Arkane Studios | Bethesda Softworks |
| 2020 | Warface | Crytek Kiev | My.com |
| 2019 | Wolfenstein: Youngblood | MachineGames | Bethesda Softworks |
| 2017 | LawBreakers | Boss Key Productions | Nexon |
| 2017 | Ode | Ubisoft Reflections | Ubisoft |
| 2017 | PUBG: Battlegrounds | Krafton | Krafton; Microsoft Studios; Tencent Games |
| 2016 | Killer Instinct: Season 3 | Double Helix Games; Iron Galaxy Studios | Microsoft Studios |
| 2015 | Eon Altar | Flying Helmet Games | Flying Helmet Games |
| 2015 | Halo: Spartan Strike | 343 Industries; Vanguard Games | Microsoft Studios |
| 2014 | Halo 2: Anniversary | Blur Studio; Bungie; Certain Affinity; Saber Interactive | Microsoft Studios |
| 2013 | Halo: Spartan Assault | 343 Industries; Vanguard Games | Microsoft Studios |
| 2013 | Galactic Reign | Slant Six Games | Microsoft Studios |
| 2012 | Tom Clancy's Ghost Recon: Future Soldier | Red Storm Entertainment; Ubisoft | Ubisoft |
| 2011 | Halo: Combat Evolved Anniversary | 343 Industries; Saber Interactive | Microsoft Studios |
| 2011 | From Dust | Ubisoft Montpellier | Ubisoft |
| 2010 | R.U.S.E. | Eugen Systems | Ubisoft |
| 2010 | Tom Clancy's H.A.W.X. 2 | Ubisoft Bucharest | Ubisoft |
| 2010 | The Agency: Covert Ops | SOE Seattle | Sony Online Entertainment |
| 2010 | Prince of Persia: The Forgotten Sands | Ubisoft | Ubisoft |
| 2010 | Red Steel 2 | Ubisoft Paris | Ubisoft |
| 2009 | Tom Clancy's H.A.W.X. | Ubisoft; Gameloft | Ubisoft |
| 2008 | Kung Fu Panda: Legendary Warriors | Artificial Mind & Movement | Activision |
| 2008 | Movie Studio Party | Phoenix Interactive Entertainment | Ubisoft |
| 2007 | Tom Clancy's Ghost Recon Advanced Warfighter 2 | Red Storm Entertainment; Ubisoft Paris | Ubisoft/Red Storm |
| 2007 | Crackdown | Realtime Worlds | Microsoft Studios |
| 2006 | Tom Clancy's Ghost Recon Advanced Warfighter | Darkworks; Grin; Red Storm Entertainment; Tiwak; Ubisoft | Ubisoft/Red Storm |
| 2006 | Red Steel | Ubisoft Paris | Ubisoft/Nintendo |
| 2006 | Full Auto 2: Battlelines | Deep Fried Entertainment; Pseudo Interactive | SEGA |
| 2006 | The Fast and the Furious | Eutechnyx | Namco |
| 2006 | Kim Possible: What's the Switch? | Behaviour Interactive | A2M |
| 2005 | Cold Fear | Darkworks | Ubisoft |
| 2005 | Project Gotham Racing 3 | Bizarre Creations; Glu Mobile | Microsoft Studios |
| 2005 | Still Life | Microïds | Microïds |
| 2005 | MLB 2006 | 989 Studios | Sony Computer Entertainment |
| 2004 | Need for Speed: Underground 2 | EAIdeaworks Game Studio; Pocketeers | EA |
| 2004 | Tom Clancy's Ghost Recon 2 | Red Storm Entertainment | Ubisoft |
| 2004 | Sprung | Longtail Studios | Ubisoft |
| 2004 | Get on da Mic | Behaviour Interactive | Eidos/A2M |
| 2004 | Rallisport Challenge 2 | EA DICE | Microsoft Studios |
| 2004 | Street Racing Syndicate | Eutechnyx Limited; Raylight Studios; Streamline Studios | Namco |

=== TV and film ===
| Title | Company Name |
| Toy Story 3 (web trailer) | Pixar |
| Astro Boy (film trailer) | Summit Entertainment |
| Coraline (film trailer) | Focus Features |
| Traitor (film trailer) | Overture Films |
| Harry Potter and the Order of the Phoenix (film trailer) | Warner Bros. |
| DOA (film trailer) | Constantin Film |
| The Da Vinci Code - Featurette: Making of and Promos | Sony |
| The Last Mimzy (film trailer) | New Line Cinema |
| Arthur and the Invisibles (TV & film trailers) | Weinstein Co. |
| Derailed (film trailer) | Miramax |
| Making of Spider-Man 2 | HBO |
| Infinity | Q45 National TV/Radio Commercial |
| GMC | National TV/Radio Commercial |
| CFDA Awards (Committee of the Fashion Designers of America) | CFDA Awards Show Theme - Televised |
| 2006 Winter Olympics | NBC |
| Joan of Arcadia | CBS |
| Third Watch | NBC |
| Latin Access | NBC |
| 1-800-Missing (Known as Missing in season 2) | Lionsgate Television |
| Making of Anaconda 2 | Cinemax |
| All Music Branding for KTLA | WB Television Network |
| Open Water (television trailer) | Lionsgate |
| Shrediquette | Indie |
| US Open Commercials | ESPN |
| Volvo | S40 Worldwide TV Commercial |
| Bertolli National Commercial | Bertolli |
| Johnny Zero | Warner Brothers |
| America's Next Top Model | UPN |
| Punk'd | MTV |
| Vertical Zoo 2004 | Indie |
| Wild Discovery Main Theme | The Discovery Channel |
| Halo: The Fall of Reach (film) | Microsoft |

=== Records and artists ===
| Album/Song | Artist(s) |
| 2 Days or Die | Atlas Plug (Solo Album) |
| "Believe" | Cher |
| Whitney: The Greatest Hits - "How Will I Know" | Whitney Houston |
| "While the Earth Sleeps" | Deep Forest and Peter Gabriel |
| "Love Has a Name" | Kathy Troccoli |
| "Moonchild" | Deborah Gibson |
| Introduction to Mayhem | Primer 55 |
| Ten Till Midnight | Tommy Page |
| Mobius - "Hardly a Day", "So It Is", "Unaware", "Epilogue (Hardly a Day Part 1)" | QED |
| Halfway Till Dawn | Philippe Saisse |
| WCW Mayhem: The Music | Various Artists |
| "Round Window" (for Malcolm in the Middle) | Flak |
| "Angel" (Remix) | Christian Davis |
| Turn the Tides | 38th Parallel |
| "Tell Me" | Dru Hill |
| "I Am Thin and Gorgeous" | Junior Vasquez |
| "One More Chance" | Julio Iglesias Jr. |
| Rarities & Remixes - "Faith, Hope & Love" | Point of Grace |
| Welcome to Woop Woop | Original Soundtrack |
| Various songs | Sinéad O'Connor |
| "Missing" (Remix) | Everything but the Girl |
| "If You Believe" (Remix) | Sascha Schmitz |
| "How Crazy Are You?" (Remix) | Meja |
| "Awa Awa" | Wes Madiko |
| "Feel What You Want" (Remix) | Kristine W |
| "Golden Brown" (Remix) | Emer Kenny |
| "The Gates of Annwn" (Remix) | Ceredwen |
| "Love Won't Wait" (Remix) | Gary Barlow |
| Leap of Faith - "It's Alright" | David Charvet |
| "Breakin'" | Arthur Baker |
| Let's Roll: Together in Unity, Faith and Love - "I Believe" | Various Artists |
| Celldweller 10 Year Anniversary Edition - "Ghosts (feat. Tom Salta)" | Celldweller |
