= Ode (video game) =

2017 video game

- Developer: Ubisoft Reflections
- Publisher: Ubisoft
- Director: Pierre Escaich
- Producer: Anne Langourieux
- Designers: Liam Charlton; Dale Scullion
- Programmers: Chris Jenner; Jon Jilja
- Artist: Jack Couvela
- Composers: Romain His; Tom Salta
- Engine: Unity
- Platform: Windows
- Release: EU: November 26, 2017; NA: November 27, 2017; AU: November 28, 2017
- Genres: Adventure; Music
- Mode: Single-player

Ode (stylized in all lowercase) is an adventure music video game developed by Ubisoft Reflections and published by Ubisoft. The game was released on November 26, 2017, in Europe, on November 27, 2017, in North America, and on November 28, 2017, in Australia, for Windows.

== Gameplay ==
The gameplay is centered around exploration and musical discovery. Players control a small creature named Joy who is in a spherical ball, as they traverse through four distinct worlds, each designed to evoke different emotional responses through color, light, and sound. The game's main objective is to collect scattered orbs, which, when gathered, contribute to the world's musical score and visual effects.

A screenshot from the game, with Joy in purple, surrounded by orbs

Ode operates without conventional game mechanics such as scores, levels, or objectives. This approach eliminates any form of competition or progression, focusing solely on the player's interaction with the game. The game's structure allows for a self-directed experience, where players determine the extent and nature of their engagement with the environment.

The controls allow the players to roll, jump, and interact with various elements in the environment. Joy can absorb different types of orbs that influence the gameplay, such as speeding up movement or altering the musical score. The game has no time limits. As players progress through the levels, they unlock new musical elements and environmental changes that allow them to shape the world around them. There are no enemies to combat in the game.

== Development ==
The game was developed by the team at Ubisoft Reflections which had developed previous games such as Grow Home (2015), Grow Up (2016), and Atomega (2017). The game is intended to be a "musical exploration" video game. The game is also intended to be an experimental video game.

== Reception ==
Reception

Aggregate scores
Aggregator	Score
Metacritic	75/100
OpenCritic	80% recommend

Review scores
Publication	Score
Edge	8/10
Eurogamer	UK: Recommended; IT: 6/10
Gamekult	7/10
GamesTM	8/10
Hardcore Gamer	7/10
IGN	ES: 8/10; IT: 7.8/10
3D Juegos	7.5/10
CD-Action	5/10
Multiplayer.it	7/10
Vandal	7/10

Ode received "generally favorable" reviews according to review aggregation website Metacritic. The game received 80% recommendation from critics on review aggregation website OpenCritic.

British video game magazine Edge gave Ode a rating of 8/10, complementing the game's gameplay. Christian Donlan for Eurogamer listed the game under 'Eurogamer Recommended', complementing the idea of Ode, and describing it as "magic". Andrea Forlani for Eurogamer Italy, rated the game 6/10, pointing out that the game itself is concise, "has nothing memorable", and that "if you are looking for a game that would resonate with your soul, you would be better off looking elsewhere".

Gauthier Andres for Gamekult gave Ode a rating of 7/10, praising the setting, sound, music, and light, stating that the game is "visually evocative and seductive", but, like Forlani, stated that the game is concise. GamesTM gave the game 8/10 in their magazine, stating that the game is "a wonderfully-executed musical masterpiece". Chris Shive for Hardcore Gamer gave the game a 7/10, stating that the game is destitute of a story and any dangerous or "malevolent" creatures to challenge the player, only praising the game's presentation.

Jose A. Rodriguez for IGN España gave Ode a rating of 8/10, complementing the graphics and the freedom to play the game at the pace of choice, and music. Marco Esposto for IGN Italia gave the game a rating of 7.8/10, praising the visuals, sound, and challenge, but, like others, condemns the length of the game, stating that is "too short". 3DJuegos rated the game 7.5/10, or 'Bueno', praising the game's relaxation and visuals, stating that the game "stands out for its great color and spectacular staging", and that it "captivates the senses with a beautiful sensory experience".

Polish video game magazine CD-Action gave Ode a rating of 5/10, stating that "Ode is a hollow, shallow experience that I will never come back to and can’t recommend". Tommaso Pugliese for Multiplayer.it rated the game 7/10, stating that "the ideas put into play are original, the artistic part appears inspired and some glimpses and sequences are undeniably evocative", but condemns the "excessive slipperiness regarding the character's movement". Ramón Varela for the Spanish review website Vandal rated the game 7/10, like others, praising the originality and relaxation, but condemning the amount of time taken to beat the game.

Ode was rated as 'one of the best PC games of 2017' by PCGamesN.
