= Exo-cell =

Exo-cell may be a misspelling of:

- Exa-cell, exagamglogene autotemcel
- Exocell, an organism in the video game Cold Fear
