= Turn the Tide =

Turn the Tide may refer to:

- Turn the Tide (album), a 1989 album by Baillie & the Boys
- "Turn the Tide" (Johnny Hates Jazz song), 1989
- "Turn the Tide" (Sylver song), 2000

== See also ==
- Turn the Tides, an album by 38th Parallel
