= Atomega =

2017 video game

- Developer: Ubisoft Reflections
- Publisher: Ubisoft
- Platform: Microsoft Windows
- Release: 19 September 2017
- Genres: Action, shooter
- Mode: Multiplayer

Atomega is an action shooter developed by Ubisoft Reflections and published by Ubisoft. The game was released for Microsoft Windows on September 19, 2017. The development team had previously developed Grow Home.

== Gameplay ==
A gameplay screenshot showing an Omega Exoform attacking a more primitive Exoform.

Atomega is a multiplayer-only action game. Played from a first-person perspective, eight players compete against each other to gain "mass" in order to score points. Players assume control of a simple Exoform when a match starts, and they must search the arena for cubes. By collecting these cubes, the player gains points and mass, which allows the Exoform to evolve to become larger and more sophisticated. The ultimate form is known as Omega Exoform, which is massive and powerful. The player who has the most mass by the end of the 10-minute match will win the game.

To gain more points, players can engage in combat with other Exoforms, which when defeated, it will deform and its mass will be disintegrated. Different forms have different properties. For instance, the Prime is slow but powerful, while Saur is weaker but faster. Players can also teleport away from enemies in combat situations, but they will lose some of their mass and devolved into a smaller Exoform. There are also "hacks", which are golden cubes that give Exoform additional skills such as healing and knocking off opponents when they are collected.

== Development ==
The game was developed by the team at Ubisoft Reflections which had developed Grow Home and Grow Up. The aim of the project is to create an "unusual" idea that will surprise players. The game was announced on September 11, 2017, and was released a week later, on September 17, 2017, for Microsoft Windows via Steam. The game only includes one mode and one map at launch.

== Reception ==
The game received mixed reviews from critics. Review aggregator Metacritic calculated an average score of 65 out of 100 based on 14 reviews. Christian Donlan from Eurogamer recommended the game, stating that the game was "fascinating" and unique. However, both Brett Makedonski from Destructoid and Mike Fahey from Kotaku noted that the game's lack of content results in low replayability and longevity.

The game was nominated for "Best Arcade Game" at The Independent Game Developers' Association Awards 2018.

Reception

Aggregate score
Aggregator	Score
Metacritic	65/100

Review scores
Publication	Score
Destructoid	6/10
Eurogamer	Recommended
PCGamesN	8/10
