= Katakara =

Katakara may refer to

- Katakara Road, a road in Mityana, Uganda
- A fictional samurai clan in the 2010 action video game Red Steel 2
