= Sprung (video game) =

2004 video game

Sprung: A Game Where Everyone Scores
- North American box art
- Developer: Longtail Studios
- Publisher: Ubisoft
- Writers: Colleen McGuinness; Sam Strachman; Edward Lee Murray; Desiree Cifre; A.J. Morales
- Composer: Tom Salta
- Platform: Nintendo DS
- Release: NA: December 7, 2004; EU: March 11, 2005
- Genres: Adventure; dating sim; visual novel
- Mode: Single player

Sprung is a video game for the Nintendo DS. It was released in North America on December 7, 2004, as one of the launch titles for the system. In Europe, the game was released under the expanded title Sprung: The Dating Game. Sprung puts players in the shoes of either Becky or Brett in a conversation-based adventure game and dating sim that mostly consists of dialogue. Sprung can also be regarded as a visual novel, though the game's level of interactivity makes it unique for its kind. The game was one of the first dating simulation games to have a wide commercial release in the United States.

The character treatments and overall plot in Sprung were conceived by Colleen McGuinness, who was the lead writer for the project. Upon release, the game received mixed reviews for its gameplay, but was praised for its comedic writing. It was noted as a unique release for its time and for pushing "the limits of the Teen rating". The working title for Sprung was Crush. Two spin-off mobile games were later released featuring characters from Sprung; Love Triangle: Dating Challenge was released in 2005 followed by Heartbreakers in 2006.

== Gameplay ==
There are two distinct narratives in the game which allow the player to play as either Brett or Becky. Both stories take place at the same locations, but under different continuities. The game is split up by different "scenes" that contain a narrative consisting of dialogue, similar to a script of an episode of a sitcom. Each scene gives the player an objective to complete. During a scene, the player will appear on the bottom screen of the Nintendo DS and the person they are talking to will appear on the top. With nearly every interaction with characters within a scene, the player is given the option from a list of responses on how to respond. Different situations will require the player to use their wit and charm, in addition to a wide variety of collectible items, to progress through the scene. Many of the items can be used at will on any character; using the pepper spray and gasoline items will often end up with the player getting arrested or committed depending on their actions. There are multiple locations in the game, all of which feature their own theme music that is influenced melodically by how characters react to choices.

Bonus scenes are unlocked through the collection of "golden lines", which are quotes that are deemed the most witty or absurd conversational options. Additional art pieces can be unlocked through the collection of various items throughout the game.

== Plot ==
Becky and Brett's narratives establish them as having been friends since childhood. They go on a trip to a ski resort as an attempt to find love, have fun, and seek new work opportunities. Brett is torn between his long-standing crush on Becky and desire to explore his options and play the field. Brett tries to navigate love on the mountain with a zany cast of eligible bachelorettes while helping his close friends Danny and Lucas with their own mischief. Along the way, he has to deal with Elliot and Conor, two pretentious men who are richer, more charming, and more famous than him. Brett's story culminates with a competition with Conor where the prize is the chance to take one of three girls on a dream vacation.

In Becky's story, she uses the vacation as an escape from her recent ex-boyfriend Sean only to have him arrive at the same time. Her story gives the player the option of a split path in the careers of waitressing or modeling, which results in different scenes becoming available. Becky's story involves maintaining her relationships with her childhood friends – the promiscuous Kiki and the geeky Erica, among new friends that can help or hinder her situation based on their motives. The player also guides Becky in advancing her career path, finding love while on the mountain, and getting revenge on her ex-boyfriend.

== Critical reception ==
Reception

Aggregate score
Aggregator	Score
Metacritic	48/100

Review scores
Publication	Score
Game Informer	6/10
GameSpot	6/10
IGN	4/10
Nintendo World Report	8/10
DS Central	4/5
eToychest	84%
The Sydney Morning Herald	2.5/5

Sprung received "generally unfavorable reviews" according to video game review aggregator Metacritic. Praise was given for the game's comedic writing, with Nintendo World Report calling the game "bizarrely fun" and writing "only someone who hates comedy could dislike this game." The Sydney Morning Herald called it "always entertaining and occasionally hilarious." Sprung's subject matter was also applauded by critics, with GameSpot calling it a "bold move", praising the developers for a "willingness to tread some risqué ground which most games tend to sidestep." DS Central noted that Sprung "takes extremely adult themes and moulds them into a light-hearted, thoroughly fantastic mess." IGN described the game as pushing "the limits of the Teen rating" and highlighted the "hint at homosexual and bisexual encounters in several of the game's dating missions."

The game's dialogue-based gameplay received mixed reviews. Some reviewers compared it to a choose your own adventure novel. Game Informer noted: "There's good humor and writing to be had here, but it's not so much a game as an interactive comic." eToychest called Sprung "surprisingly addictive" and described it as "amusing and well-written" but remarked that the gameplay could "alienate some gamers who do not have an affinity for games whose primary game mechanic is based around retention." In a mixed review, GameSpot described the gameplay as "frustrating" but the art as "fairly smooth and effective." IGN also praised the game's animation, calling it "incredibly well done, almost feature film quality". The game was criticized for its minimal use of the Nintendo DS's touch screen.

Sprung's wide array of collectible items (notably pepper spray) and the ability to use them on any character was praised by reviewers, though The Globe and Mail wrote that the feature was not implemented frequently enough. Nintendo World Report wrote that "using pepper spray suddenly and for no reason usually creates some prime comedy" and GameSpot recommended "trying the pepper spray at least once, since it's fun to blind people and get arrested".

In the years following its release, Sprung has been looked back on in a more positive light. In a retrospective review, Sprung was again praised for its writing and humor by Rice Digital. The publication described the game as a "movie plot turned interactive" and a unique release for its time. In 2021, TheGamer described Sprung as a "hidden gem" and an "excellent game".

== See also ==
- Visual novel
