= Awesome (video game) =

1990 video game

- Amiga cover art
- Developer: Reflections Interactive
- Publisher: Psygnosis
- Designers: Martin Edmondson; Cormac Batstone
- Artists: Martin Edmondson; Cormac Batstone
- Composers: Tim Wright; Lee Wright
- Platforms: Amiga, Atari ST, FM Towns
- Release: Amiga; EU: 1990; Atari ST; EU: Mid-1991; FM Towns; JP: 27 March 1992
- Genre: Action
- Mode: Single-player

Awesome is a science fiction action video game released by Psygnosis for the Amiga in 1990. It features a variety of gameplay styles, from overhead shooting to Asteroids-like sequences, and a pre-rendered ray-traced intro. The objective is to traverse the galaxy despite not having the funds or fuel to do it.

== Gameplay ==
Awesome is an action video game set in a fictional planetary system called Octaria. It can be divided into several sequences. The first sequence has the player's spaceship, the Elapidae, in hyperspace en route to a planet, but the voyage is interrupted as space pirates and meteors threaten it. The player controls the forward and backward thrusts of the Elapidae and rotates it left or right while the action is viewed from a top-down perspective. The player must clear the area of enemies or meteors before their ship can jump back into hyperspace. The game begins with the Elapidae having a certain amount of energy used for its shields and firepower, and the player must complete their objectives while manoeuvring their ship in order to avoid taking damage, which depletes the energy. Upon clearance of the area, the Elapidae returns to hyperspace, and the player has the option to allocate the ship's energy to its shields and firepower and select any of the weapons they have purchased before continuing its voyage. There may be more than one interruption between the ship's starting point and destination, and the player must be ready to clear more areas accordingly.

Upon reaching the destination planet, the game transitions into sequence two as the landing-craft forward of the Elapidae detaches and the camera switches to a 3D perspective. In this sequence, the player battles a giant space serpentine creature. The player's landing craft can fire its weapons straight forward and dodge left or right and up or down. After defeating the creature, the ship arrives into the planet's atmosphere, moving the game into sequence three. The player must destroy a certain number of alien spacecraft and then find and dock their craft on a landing pad before exhausting their oxygen level. The fourth and final sequence begins with the remaining oxygen from the previous segment, in which the player controls their crew and must find the entrance to the location's underground complex. At the point, the player can fulfill contracts and commit to new contracts. For fulfilling the contracts, the player is rewarded with fuel for the ship, as well as disks and crystals, the game's currency. The disks and crystals can then be exchanged for cargo, weapons, and boarding additional crew members. The player then views the Navcom Screen, where they position the orbiting planets in relation to the current location. They then spend their currency to pay a hotel rent as they wait for the two planets to come close enough to each other, saving the ship's fuel. The end goal is to complete all contracts from each of the eight planets, acquiring enough fuel to escape Octaria.

== Development ==
The theme music was composed by Tim Wright. The box art for Awesome was painted by science fiction artist John Harris.

Awesome was first launched for Amiga in 1990. An Atari ST port followed in mid-1991. It was later published for FM Towns by Fujitsu on 27 March 1992.

== Reception ==
Reception

Review scores
Publication	Score
ACE	900/1000
Amiga Action	80%
Amiga User International	78%
Computer and Video Games	81%
Génération 4	72%
Joystick	93%
The Games Machine (Italy)	95%
Zzap!64	79%
Amiga Joker	62%
Datormagazin	7/10
The One	85%

The Amiga release of Awesome received generally favorable reviews. ACE said the game was visually attractive. The One felt the game lacked in originality, but that this was compensated by its long-term playability. Computer + Video Games deemed the title "a little disappointing" by Psygnosis standards. Zzap!64 described the title as a "hotch-potch of game styles", with none of the subgames being particularly strong. Amiga Joker thought that Awesome was a very mediocre game.

Graphics and music from the game were featured in one of the "crossover" levels of the Amiga and some other versions of Psygnosis's later game Lemmings.
