= Thunder Truck Rally =

1997 video game

Thunder Truck Rally Monster Trucks
- North American Windows box art
- Developer: Reflections
- Publisher: Psygnosis
- Platforms: PlayStation, Windows
- Release: PlayStation: EU: March 1997; NA: 3 June 1997; Windows; 1997
- Genre: Racing
- Modes: Single-player, multiplayer

Thunder Truck Rally (released as Monster Trucks in Europe) is a 1997 racing video game developed by Reflections and published by Psygnosis for the PlayStation and Microsoft Windows. Players select a monster truck or otherwise 4X4 vehicle equipped with monster truck tires and have the option of either racing or crushing cars in an arena.

== Gameplay ==
In car crushing mode, players are awarded style points for how well they crush other vehicles.

== Development ==
During development of the game, project leader Martin Edmondson stated, "No code is shared between DD2 and Monster Trucks (with the exception of surrounding code such as sound and sprite routines). Monster Trucks started development about three quarters through DD1 and is a game based on those famous car-crushing, monster pick-up trucks with the oversized wheels."

== Reception ==
Reception

Aggregate score
Aggregator	Score
GameRankings	63%

Review scores
Publication	Score
AllGame	3.5/5
Edge	6/10
Electronic Gaming Monthly	7/10
Game Informer	7.75/10
GameFan	79%
GamePro	3.5/5
GameRevolution	C−
GameSpot	5.3/10
IGN	7/10
Next Generation	3/5
PlayStation Official Magazine – UK	6/10
PC Games (DE)	(PC) 78%

The PlayStation version received mixed reviews according to the review aggregation website GameRankings. Glenn Rubenstein of GameSpot described it as "A fairly average driving game with a few new bells and whistles", Next Generation as "Not horrible, but nothing special either", and IGN as "a good, solid title, although the grainy graphics do grate sometimes." GamePro concluded that "For off-road fans, it's a pretty solid buy, but run-of-the-mill racing buffs should get enough with only one rental."

Most critics found that the game's car crushing mode, which they anticipated would have the most immediate appeal to players, is shallow and ultimately unexciting. Some also complained that in endurance mode, the guiding arrow tends to veer unexpectedly, which they felt was unfair, since the AI opponents always immediately know how to take a turn. Both Rubenstein and Next Generation remarked that while the controls are generally very good, the physics make it too easy to go off on a high jump that severely damages the player's truck. Other common criticisms were the extensive pop-up and weak sound effects, while subjects of praise included the rigorous course design, and the numerous modes and options available.
