= RalliSport Challenge 2 =

2004 video game

- Developer: Digital Illusions CE
- Publisher: Microsoft Game Studios
- Platform: Xbox
- Release: NA: 4 May 2004; EU: 21 May 2004; JP: 10 June 2004
- Genre: Racing
- Modes: Single-player, multiplayer

RalliSport Challenge 2 is a rally racing video game developed by Digital Illusions CE and published by Microsoft Game Studios for the Xbox in 2004. Released as a sequel to the 2002 video game RalliSport Challenge, the game introduced several new features, including a career mode, additional cars, and track types with new environments, including night driving and ice racing. Digital Illusions CE developed RalliSport Challenge 2 as a completely new approach from its predecessor, with the developers aiming to create a more realistic and diverse simulation of rally racing by introducing added environmental effects and an improved car damage and handling model.

Microsoft released RalliSport Challenge 2 under the Xbox Sports Network line of sports games, marketed to take advantage of the Xbox Live network with online multiplayer. Similar to other Xbox Sports Network games, RalliSport Challenge 2 featured expanded multiplayer features, including online tournaments and leaderboards. Upon release, the game was positively received by reviewers, with praise directed towards the game's realistic visual presentation, the ease and accessibility of handling, and multiplayer features. Retrospective reviews of RalliSport Challenge 2 have assessed the game as one of the best racing games released for the Xbox, with a focus on the game's technical achievement at the time of its release.

== Gameplay ==
Gameplay screenshot

Described as an "arcade-style racer", RalliSport Challenge 2 features several racing modes from RalliSport Challenge, including 'Rally', a point-to-point solo race; 'Rallycross', a race against three opponents on a looped track; 'Ice Racing'; and 'Hill Climb', a race to the top of an incline. The game also features two new modes: 'Ice Racing', a race on a slick circular track, and 'Crossover', a race that switches lanes on a looped track. Races can be completed in several modes, including a 'Career' mode which features a progression of 90 tracks with progression through four difficulties ('Amateur', 'Pro', 'Champion', and 'Superrally'), with completion of Career tracks unlocking access to over 40 rally cars and new courses. The game also features 'Time Attack' races for the player to compete against recorded lap times and 'Single Race' modes played solo or against the computer.

A major addition to the design of RalliSport Challenge 2 over its predecessor was enhancements to the damage and handling model. Collision in the game creates damage to several components of the player's car, with many parts of the car becoming completely destructible, such as windows, doors, hoods and wheels. The game's interface allows players to monitor the status of damage to their car, with major damage affecting driving performance, such as speed and handling. Between races, players also can adjust tuning options to manipulate the handling of their car, including to change the tyre type for different environments, gear type and ratio, steering, and advanced options for brakes, power, and suspension.

RalliSport Challenge 2 featured integration with Xbox Live, which allowed for multiplayer races. Using Xbox Live or System Link, players could host or join a lobby to participate in races of up to sixteen players in contrast to the four available in local play. Online play was enhanced by the Xbox Sports Network, providing support for round robin and single elimination tournaments and seasons of races for players to compete as individuals or as part of a team. The Xbox Sports Network also featured web integration, which allowed players to track statistics, message other players, participate in forums, and receive notifications and updates on the XSN website. In line with other online-enabled games on the Xbox, multiplayer on Xbox Live was available to players until 15 April 2010. Rallisport Challenge 2 is now playable online again on the replacement Xbox Live servers called Insignia.

== Development and release ==
RalliSport Challenge 2 was developed by Swedish developers Digital Illusions CE. The company began development immediately following the release of RalliSport Challenge in March 2002, with a total development time of two years. Producer Karl Magnus Troedsson stated development of the game was done from scratch, with "most of the architecture" of the game changed from RalliSport Challenge, including new environments and tracks. Lead designer Patrick Bach noted that the game was intended to "better reflect what a real rally is" over its predecessor, with the inclusion of an improved physics and damage model, wider roads, and longer track lengths. Product manager Adam Kovach stated the development process was also driven by player feedback seeking "more content" to the game, with the game's user-set career mode expanding the level of unlockable tracks available to the player.

In September 2003, RalliSport Challenge 2 was announced by Microsoft Game Studios as the first racing title in the Xbox Sports Network, a series of licensed sports games developed to take advantage of multiplayer capabilities under Xbox Live. Program manager David Bridgham stated the game was "built from the ground up" to support the online features of Xbox Live, with the game designed to support online tournaments and leaderboards using the service. RalliSport Challenge 2 was the last title to be released under the Xbox Sports Network upon cancellation of the brand in March 2004 due to the underperformance of titles. The game was showcased by Digital Illusions CE and Microsoft at several trade shows, including the Tokyo Game Show in September 2003, X in September 2003, and E3 in May 2004.

RalliSport Challenge 2 was the first major video game project of recording artist and composer Tom Salta, who developed several songs for the soundtrack of the game. The tracks were taken from Salta's 2004 debut album, 2 Days or Die. Salta stated the songs were developed intentionally under the moniker Atlas Plug for media licensing, with his publisher successfully pitching the music to Microsoft for licensing in RalliSport Challenge 2 before the songs were completed. Salta cited the "sheer energy" and "aggressive" tone of the tracks as suited to the racing genre. Exposure from RalliSport Challenge 2 led Volvo to license Salta's music for several advertisements for the S40, supported by footage from the game.

== Reception ==
Reception

Aggregate score
Aggregator	Score
Metacritic	87/100

Review scores
Publication	Score
Edge	6/10
Electronic Gaming Monthly	9/10
Eurogamer	9/10
Famitsu	32/40
Game Informer	7.25/10
GamePro	4.5/5
GameRevolution	A−
GameSpot	9.3/10
GameSpy	4.5/5
GamesRadar+	4.5/5
GameZone	9/10
Hyper	83%
IGN	9.2/10
Official Xbox Magazine (US)	9/10
Xbox Nation (XBN)	9/10

RalliSport Challenge 2 received "generally favorable" reviews from critics according to the review aggregation website Metacritic. GameSpot praised the game as a "wonderful sequel" and "fantastic rally racing game from top to bottom", stating that the game's presentational and feature upgrades "give the game a huge boost of replay value over its predecessor". Eurogamer praised the game as a "technical achievement" and "benchmark product in virtually every area". GameSpy praised the game as "supremely entertaining" and "hugely varied, devilishly addictive, and as purely accessible as a would-be rally champion could hope for." GameSpot named the game as the best Xbox title of May 2004, and a runner-up for its 2004 "Best Driving Game" award category. During the 8th Annual Interactive Achievement Awards, the Academy of Interactive Arts & Sciences nominated RalliSport Challenge 2 for "Racing Game of the Year", which was ultimately awarded to Burnout 3: Takedown.

The graphics and visual presentation of the game were highlighted, with several reviewers praising the game as the most visually impressive console racing game for its time. Eurogamer praised the game as "a new benchmark for driving games", stating "In terms of the graphics alone, it's easily one of the best looking games", focusing on the "intricate touches" to the design of the track environments. GameSpot stated that the road and track textures were "absolutely perfect" and that "every visual effect associated with the cars...look absolutely great. There just aren't better car models available in any game currently on the console racing market". GameZone described the game as "easily the best-looking game released thus far this year", focusing upon the "intricately detailed environments" and "jaw-dropping" and "amazing" weather effects. Xbox Nation praised the game's "near photo-realism" as "shockingly good" and "hyperreal", describing the visuals as an "amazing replication of vehicular life on the edge and in the dirt".

Critics also focused upon the accessible handling of the cars, bridging the arcade and simulation genre of racing games. Eurogamer praised the handling as "impressively realistic yet fun" and "utterly assured and natural", describing it as "the most convincing car handling in any game". GameSpot praised the diversity of handling, stating that cars "handle superbly" and "each one drives just a bit differently...you can definitely feel the differences in each car". GameSpy described the handling as having an "arcade sensibility that knows just what hardcore elements to retain and which to minimize in favor of pure fun", stating "the physics have been balanced for a sense of notable realism..the sense of velocity is impressive". Similarly, Xbox Nation stated the "controls feel just arcadey enough to take the frustration out of driving a real car, but without being condescending to the veterans of the genre". However, Game Informer critiqued the handling as simplified, stating "cars feel like they pivot on a central point too much...I could veer from side to side and not feel like I was losing control of the car", suggesting this took the "skill and danger" out of gameplay.

The multiplayer features of the game were praised by critics, although many were mixed on the implementation of larger races. GameSpy stated the game "makes a great case for Live as a truly useful online service", remarking that the online play "adds a much higher level of competitiveness to already peerless tracks". Electronic Gaming Monthly praised the online play as "flawless", stating the game "(runs) perfectly on Xbox Live". However, IGN noted that "track design and technical issues" made play on many tracks impractical with sixteen players. GameSpot similarly stated that "with collision turned off, you don't see the full car models of your opponents; rather, you're given colored outlines of the cars...it is a little bizarre that the ability to collide with other cars actually determines the number of cars in a race".

=== Sales ===
RalliSport Challenge 2 was a commercial disappointment. The game sold 410,000 units as of December 2005, well under half of the 900,000 units sold of RalliSport Challenge. The game entered the UK sales charts at a peak position of 13 in May 2004. David Jenkins of Game Developer observed the "disappointing" sales performance of the game, predicting "little hope of long-term success". The game fared slightly better upon release in other markets, peaking at 10 on the US EB Games sales charts for all consoles in August 2004 and at 9 in Japan in October 2004.

=== Retrospective reception ===
Several outlets praised RalliSport Challenge 2 in the years immediately following its release. Eurogamer, in a 2006 article, stated that the game "remains the finest arcade rally game ever made", praising the game for "pushing the capabilities of the Xbox to near-breaking point". Hyper described the game as a "tragically overlooked rally title", praising the game's multiplayer mode and replayability as "bringing out the best in rally racers". IGN deemed the game one of the best racing games for the Xbox, praising the game as an "all-time favorite" and stating "not only is it one of the best-looking Xbox racers, it is incredibly fun to play". Writing in a compendium of driving games, Sanches praised the game as an "impressively accomplished and worthy driving game", praising the game's "daunting single-player content", "various and engaging types of events offered", and the game's "remarkable environments" as "easily some of the best technically and largest in any genre at the time of its release".
