= RalliSport Challenge =

2002 video game

- Mitsubishi Lancer Evo VI
- Developer: Digital Illusions CE
- Publisher: Microsoft Game Studios
- Platforms: Xbox, Microsoft Windows
- Release: Xbox: NA: 7 March 2002; PAL: 14 March 2002; Microsoft Windows: NA: 7 November 2002; EU: 15 November 2002
- Genre: Racing
- Modes: Single-player, multiplayer

RalliSport Challenge is a 2002 rally racing video game for Microsoft Windows and the Xbox. It features a race career and 29 cars including the Mitsubishi Lancer Evo VI and the Suzuki Grand Vitara. Four race types that are included in the game are Rally, Hillclimb, Ice Racing, and Rallycross. A sequel, RalliSport Challenge 2, was released in 2004 for the Xbox.

== Gameplay ==
For Rally, drivers simply race from points A to B. In career mode, drivers will race one by one while in single race, drivers will race with the computer. That is applied to the rest of the races except for Ice Racing and Rallycross.

In Hillclimb, drivers will race up or speed down a dangerous mountain with cliffs and rocks along the track. One mistake can send drivers off the cliff or into rocks thus damaging the car and degrading performance.

For Ice Racing, drivers race on a track with a slick bed of ice for a certain number of laps. The run off areas are sometimes snow that can cost vital places or time.

On Rallycross, drivers will race around a certain track, at the same time as all the others, with multiple types of road such as gravel and asphalt, for a certain number of laps.

Drivers will start with eight cars, no matter if the starting level of Beginner or Normal is used. They will require doing a career to unlock the remaining 21 cars. In Beginner mode, drivers are able to restart a race at any point in a rally they wish. However, in Normal, in order to restart, drivers must race the entire rally over no matter what.

Outside of the career mode one can take part in time attacks. When participating in these, a ghost of the driver's best lap is loaded, saved or played every time one undertakes that race. There is also a split screen multi-player mode in which players race head-to-head in whatever race mode they are.

== Reception ==
Reception

Aggregate score
Aggregator	Score	
Aggregator	PC	Xbox
Metacritic	77/100	87/100

Review scores
Publication	Score	
Publication	PC	Xbox
AllGame	N/A	3.5/5
Edge	N/A	6/10
Electronic Gaming Monthly	N/A	8.33/10
Eurogamer	N/A	10/10
Game Informer	N/A	8/10
GamePro	N/A	4/5
GameRevolution	N/A	B+
GameSpot	8.8/10	9.1/10
GameSpy	4.5/5	4/5
GameZone	8/10	9.1/10
IGN	8/10	9.2/10
Official Xbox Magazine (US)	N/A	8.6/10
PC Gamer (US)	81%	N/A
BBC Sport	N/A	92%
The Cincinnati Enquirer	N/A	4.5/5

The game received "generally favorable reviews" on both platforms according to the review aggregation website Metacritic. GameSpot named RalliSport Challenge the second-best video game of March 2002.

RalliSport Challenge was a nominee for PC Gamer US's "2002 Best Racing Game" award, which ultimately went to NASCAR Racing 2002 Season. It won GameSpot's annual "Best Driving Game on Xbox" award, and was a runner-up in the "Best Driving Game on PC", "Best Graphics (Technical) on Xbox" and "Game of the Year on Xbox" categories. The game was also a nominee for "Console Racing Game of the Year" at the AIAS' 6th Annual Interactive Achievement Awards, which ultimately went to Need for Speed: Hot Pursuit 2.
