= 2 Days or Die =

Studio album by Atlas Plug
- Released: February 25, 2004
- Recorded: United Kingdom
- Genre: Electronic; Soundtrack
- Length: 49:30
- Label: Persist, FiXT Music
- Producer: Tom Salta

Professional ratings
Review scores
Source	Rating
G4	favourable

2 Days or Die is an album that was released on February 25, 2004, by Atlas Plug. The album was originally released only as a digital release (MP3), and later on CD.

The album did receive some positive coverage.

== Track listing ==
1. "Halfway Till Bliss"
2. "The Ace The Only"
3. "2 Days or Die"
4. "Rule the World"
5. "Get Rolled On"
6. "Truth Be Known"
7. "Crimson Phoenix"
8. "Winds of Sand"
9. "Steel Run"
10. "Infiltrate This"

== Appearances ==
- "The Ace the Only" made its appearance in Project Gotham Racing 3 and MLB 2006 as an in game soundtrack.
- "2 Days or Die", "Rule the World", and "Get Rolled On" all appear in the racing game Rallisport Challenge 2.
- Crackdown features the songs
  "Halfway Till Bliss",
  "The Ace The Only",
  "Rule The World", and "Get Rolled On".
- "Rule The World" appears in Street Racing Syndicate as an in game soundtrack.
