= Brian the Lion =

1994 video game

- Developer: Reflections
- Publisher: Psygnosis
- Designers: Michael Troughton, Russell Lazzari, Thomas Szirtes
- Artist: Philip Baxter
- Composers: Mike Clarke; Richard Ede (Rik Ede)
- Platforms: Amiga, Amiga CD32
- Release: EU: 1994
- Genre: Platform
- Mode: Single-player

Brian the Lion is a 2D side-scrolling platform game for the Amiga and Amiga CD32 developed by Reflections and published by Psygnosis in 1994. The player controls Brian, an anthropomorphic lion, who can defeat enemies by either clawing them or jumping on their heads.
