= Red Steel =

2006 video game

- European cover art
- Developer: Ubisoft Paris
- Publisher: Ubisoft
- Director: Nicolas Eypert
- Producer: Marie-Sol Beaudry
- Designer: Roman Campos-Oriola
- Programmer: François Mahieu
- Writers: Jérôme Collette; Laurent Courtiaud; Julien Carbon
- Engine: Unreal Engine 2
- Platform: Wii
- Release: NA: November 19, 2006; JP: December 2, 2006; AU: December 7, 2006; EU: December 8, 2006
- Genre: First-person shooter
- Modes: Single-player, multiplayer

Red Steel is a 2006 first-person shooter video game developed by Ubisoft Paris and published by Ubisoft for the Wii. The game was released in November 2006 in North America, with releases in other regions arriving the following month, and was a Wii launch title in all regions.

Red Steel received generally mixed reviews from critics who praised the game's graphics and soundtrack, while the controls and sword-fighting sections were criticised. It was a commercial success, selling over one million copies worldwide. A stand-alone sequel, Red Steel 2, was released in 2010.

== Gameplay ==
The game makes use of the Wii's motion-sensitive controller, along with the Nunchuk attachment, to control a katana and a firearm. The on-screen gun hand points the gun in the same direction the Wii Remote is pointing. Players can push objects to use them as cover by pushing the controller forward. Shaking the Nunchuk attachment or pressing "right" on the D-Pad reloads the gun. The player can throw grenades underhand or overhand by moving the Nunchuk as though it were the actual grenade.

The AI characters can "care for themselves" according to project leader Roman Campos Oriola; enemies are aggressive, moving around objects and the environment to attack the player (like jumping on a table instead of running around).

The AI allows enemies to surrender, rather than fight to the death. The player can shoot the weapon out of an enemy's hands, causing him to raise his hands in surrender. Alternatively, disarming the leader of a mob of enemies will cause the entire mob to surrender. Once an enemy has surrendered, the player has the option to either shoot the opponent or direct him to kneel with hands behind his head by waving the gun at him. In the sword fighting aspect, a similar option exists. After winning a sword fight, the enemy gets on their knees and the player has the choice of whether to deliver a coup de grace or to show mercy. In both sword and gun fights, sparing a defeated enemy essentially removes them from the gameplay, and they can no longer attack the player nor be hit by gunfire. In addition, the player is awarded respect points. Slaying an enemy who has surrendered has no gameplay benefits.

Recklessness is discouraged by limited ammunition supplies and a system that adds "freeze points" for accuracy/efficiency while using one's weaponry. When a certain number of points is accumulated, the player is able to momentarily freeze time, thus allowing for more accurate attacks.

In story mode and multiplayer "Killer" matches, the remote acts as a telephone using its internal speaker. It rings for the player to place it against their ear. The mission objectives are then given without the other players being able to hear what they are.

=== Multiplayer ===
Up to four players can play together on four different maps: Dojo, Restaurant, Games, and Docks. The multiplayer mode is split-screen with traditional deathmatches. According to the project leader, "perhaps most impressive is the fact that although split-screen reduces the amount of on-screen space you are playing in, you don't have to make smaller movements —you can gesture as wildly as you want, and it won't interfere with the other player's on-screen quadrants".

Red Steel features three multiplayer modes: Deathmatch, Team Deathmatch, and Killer:

- In Deathmatch, each player fights independently and must score as many kills as possible to win.
- In Team Deathmatch, the players are in two teams. The team with the most kills wins.
- In Killer, each player fights independently. This mode consists of rounds. At the beginning of each round, each player receives a secret objective through the speaker of the Wii Remote. A timer is set that defines the duration of the round. The first player to complete the objective wins the round. Depending on the difficulty of the round, players will be rewarded different quantities of points. Killer mode is only playable with four players.

Another feature of multiplayer is the notion of "bonuses". Before beginning play, each player chooses one of three bonuses: More Damage, More Life, or Unlimited Ammunition. During play, the bonus meter increases for each enemy killed. Once the gauge begins to fill up, players can press the "1" button on the control to activate their selected bonus for a period of time proportional to how full the meter is.

== Plot ==
Scott Monroe, an American bodyguard, is engaged to Miyu Sato, daughter of Isao Sato. At a hotel, Scott is to meet Isao for the first time. A gang manages to disguise themselves as the hotel staff and open fire on Sato's room. Scott tries to help, but is knocked unconscious. He awakens and grabs a pistol off a dead bodyguard, fights through the gang, and meets up with Sato, who is injured, on the roof.

Scott learns the ways of the katana from Sato after being attacked by a waiter with a sword. Sato and Scott retreat to Sato's room, where Scott covers Miyu, Sato, and Ryuichi, one of Sato's guards, as they head to their car in the parking lot. Scott meets up with them, but Ryuichi turns on them and kidnaps both Sato and Miyu. Scott pursues the car and saves Isao after shooting the car and besting the driver in sword combat, while Ryuichi manages to escape with Miyu.

In Little Tokyo, they meet up with Tony Tanaka. Sato is revealed to be the Oyabun of one of the largest yakuza families. To track down Ryuichi, Scott raids the Angel's Heaven, a spa which Ryuichi's mistress Angel owns, and Extreme Wheels, Ryuichi's car workshop, secretly used as a front to ship weapons. Ryuichi confronts Scott at an airport and bests him in combat, but spares him, as he escapes to Japan with Miyu. The yakuza will only hand Miyu over if the Katana Giri, a katana once used to execute dishonorable godfathers, is given as ransom. Sato gives Scott the Giri, before dying of his injuries.

In Tokyo, Scott makes contact with Otori, a former samurai, and Harry Tanner, an American nightclub owner who assists him in tracking down Ryuichi. Harry leads Scott to a waste processing plant off the coast of Tokyo, where Ryuichi delivers Miyu to Tokai. Ryuichi duels Scott again, but is defeated. Scott spares him, but Ryuichi is murdered by a sniper while giving information to Scott.

Tokai is revealed to have taken over the major franchises of Tokyo - financing, gaming, Geisha houses, and docks - bringing down the Sanro Kai, the leaders of these districts. Scott goes to the four separate districts, either managing to restore faith in the Sato Gumi to old members of the Sanro Kai or overthrowing a new leader appointed by Tokai.

Scott delivers the Giri to Otori for safekeeping. Back at Harry's bar, Tokai is waiting for Scott. Harry turns on Scott, knocking him unconscious. Scott is brought down into the basement to be tortured by Dozan, one of Tokai's henchmen. Scott manages to grab a sword and bring down Dozan, and escapes the cellar to interrogate Harry. Harry grabs a katana and battles Scott, giving him information after he is defeated and begging for his life. Whether Harry lives or dies, like most duels, is up to the player.

Harry reveals that Tokai has raided Otori's dojo, having hired the Komori, a new wave of elite ninjas. During the attack, Otori's daughter Mariko is poisoned by the Komori leader, who wields a poisonous katana, as she tries to protect the Katana Giri in Otori's shrine. The attack is thwarted, and Scott travels to one of Tokai's bases, where he is going to execute the members of the Sanro Kai. Scott duels Tokai, learning he wanted the Giri to kill the Kai; they executed Tokai's father with the sword, and he wanted to avenge his father with it. Scott bests him and saves most of the Sanro Kai, but Tokai flees, thanks to a distraction by a Komori. After catching up to him, Scott is forced to duel with the Komori leader, allowing Tokai to escape; Scott emerges victorious.

Otori and Scott travel to Tokai's residence for the final battle. Otori is bent on avenging his daughter, and goes on his own to create a diversion for Scott. During the raid, Otori is cut and poisoned by a Komori blade. Scott confronts Tokai one last time, and defeats him. Tokai pleads with Scott to let him live, telling him that only he has the antidote for what has poisoned Otori and Mariko. Here, the player is presented with a choice: they may either protect Tokai from an approaching Otori, or stand by and let Otori kill Tokai.

If Scott moves to defend Tokai, he fights Otori and breaks the Katana Giri in the process. Otori respects Scott's action and honors him. Otori and his daughter are cured with the antidote. At the end of the game, all the characters are at Isao's funeral. The Sanro Kai explains that they understand Tokai's motivation for his actions, but he must be punished.

If Scott lets Otori kill Tokai or is unable to defeat Otori, then Tokai is killed; Otori and Mariko both die from the poison. Scott and Miyu leave Tokai's estate alone, ending the game on a more negative note.

== Development ==
The associate producer of Red Steel, Jean-Baptiste Duval, said in an interview with Australian video game magazine Hyper that the game runs on a modified Unreal Engine 2.5. He said that much of the Ubisoft staff had worked on the engine and knew its strengths and weaknesses. The graphics of the game have been designed to achieve a defining artistic style rather than photorealism.

== Reception ==
Reception

Aggregate score
Aggregator	Score
Metacritic	63/100

Review scores
Publication	Score
1Up.com	C
Edge	5/10
Electronic Gaming Monthly	5.17/10
Eurogamer	6/10
Famitsu	34/40
Game Informer	7.5/10
GamePro	3.25/5
GameRevolution	D
GameSpot	5.5/10
GameSpy	2/5
GameTrailers	7.8/10
GameZone	7.9/10
IGN	6/10
Nintendo Power	8/10
The New York Times	(average)

Red Steel received wildly mixed reviews. While IGN referred to it as "the only Wii launch game whose controls seem to occasionally glitch out for no obvious reason" and commented that "the process of turning is disappointingly slow and clunky", reviewers for both GameSpot and IGN found no problem whatsoever with the controls outside of the occasional sword-fighting sections, and GameTrailers noted that the controls are ambitiously complex and take time to master, but otherwise work well. Likewise, while IGN lauded the graphics as technically impressive, GameSpot and 1UP.com both contended that the graphics are inexcusably below par compared to other recent releases, and GameTrailers claimed that the graphics bizarrely vary between the two extremes; Ars Technica found the graphics outdated, but praised the particle and explosion effects. Finally, while GameSpot and 1UP.com described the sword-fighting sections as clunky and crude, with GameSpot remarking that they "feel more like two cavemen hitting each other with clubs than like two highly trained samurai going at it", both IGN and GameTrailers described them as flawed but overall decent, with GameTrailers praising the strategy created by having life bars for both man and weapon. Official Nintendo Magazine agreed, saying that the game was "clearly designed with the hardcore gamer in mind. It's slick, addictive and as close to "cool" as a game can get".

The one point of agreement among reviewers was the soundtrack, which was considered exceptional by most.

Red Steel has sold over one million copies worldwide. It received a "Gold" sales award from the Entertainment and Leisure Software Publishers Association (ELSPA), indicating sales of at least 200,000 copies in the United Kingdom.
