= Cold Fear =

2005 video game

- Developer: Darkworks
- Publisher: Ubisoft
- Director: Antoine Villette
- Producer: Florian Desforges
- Designer: Nicholas Castaing
- Programmers: Claude Levastre; Cedric Lecacheur
- Artists: Arnaud Barros; Frédéric Michel
- Writers: Guillaume Gouraud; Antoine Villette
- Composer: Tom Salta
- Engine: RenderWare
- Platforms: PlayStation 2, Xbox, Microsoft Windows
- Release: PS2 & Xbox: EU: March 4, 2005; NA: March 15, 2005; Windows: NA: March 28, 2005; EU: March 30, 2005
- Genres: Survival horror, third-person shooter
- Mode: Single-player

Cold Fear is a 2005 survival horror third-person shooter video game developed by Darkworks and published by Ubisoft for PlayStation 2, Xbox and Microsoft Windows. It was Darkworks' second game, after Alone in the Dark: The New Nightmare in 2001. The game is centered on Tom Hansen, a guardsman of the United States Coast Guard, who aids a Russian whaler in the Bering Strait and finds a mysterious parasite has turned the crew into zombie-like creatures. Discovering the involvement of both the Russian mafia and the CIA, Hansen sets out to ensure the parasites don't reach land.

The game was first announced at Electronic Entertainment Expo (E3) in 2004. To make the ship roll realistically, the developers had to write a completely new program (dubbed the "Darkwave editor") to allow them to control movement on both the vertical and the horizontal axes. They also used real physics to simulate the movement patterns of inanimate objects on the ship. Due to the random nature created by this, the player character required nine times the number of animations usually seen in third-person games. Ultimately, the game contained more than nine hundred separate animations for all characters, allowing for over five thousand possible character movements. The game's soundtrack was composed by Tom Salta, with Marilyn Manson contributing a song from his fifth studio album The Golden Age of Grotesque (2003).

Cold Fear was met with mixed reviews, with many critics comparing it unfavorably to Resident Evil 4 released the same year. Although critics were generally impressed with the environments and the opening scenes, they found the game too short and felt it failed to live up to its promising beginning. The game was a commercial failure; by February 2006, it had sold only 70,000 units across all three platforms in the United States. Atari SA acquired the IP from Ubisoft in 2025, leading to the game being delisted on Steam and later re-released on GOG.com.

== Gameplay ==
Cold Fear is a survival horror third-person shooter played from either a third-person fixed camera perspective or an over-the-shoulder camera, depending on the player's preferences.

The main enemies in the game are Russian mercenaries and various types of zombie-like creatures known as "Exos" (creatures infected by a parasitic organism known as an "Exocel"). Exos include "Exomutants" (mercenaries infected with Exocels), "Exoshades" (creatures which can see perfectly in the dark), "Exospectres" (which can turn transparent for brief periods of time) and "Exomasses" (a hugely strong but deformed creature created as a result of a failed experiment). Most infected enemies can be knocked down with two or three shots, but unless the brain is destroyed, they will not die, and will eventually attack Hansen again. Players can destroy the brain either by shooting enemy in the head, or knocking them down and stomping on their head. If an enemy gets close to Hansen, the player can perform a critical hit by pressing a combination of buttons. All exos carry at least one exocel within them. When the exo is killed, the exocel may emerge and attack Hansen, or, if there are any other dead bodies in the area, infect and re-animate that body. Exocels are fast, but very weak and can be killed with one gunshot.

Hansen holds onto a railing with his left hand to stop himself from sliding across the deck of the Eastern Spirit, while aiming a gun at a nearby enemy with his right. Note also the object attached to the cable swinging freely in the environment.

The first half of the game is set on a whaler in the middle of a storm, and the conditions on the deck affect the degree of control the player has over Hansen. As the ship sways continuously from side to side, aiming is made more difficult, although Hansen can grab onto a ledge to steady himself, if one is available. In some instances, the ship can sway to such a degree that Hansen will slide towards the edge and potentially fall overboard. There are also numerous environmental hazards on the deck which react to the motion of the ship, such as swinging electrical wires and crates hooked up to ropes. If any of these items hit Hansen, he will lose health. Waves crashing on to the ship's deck can also cause Hansen damage.

The game also features a Resistance gauge, which decreases as the player performs certain actions, such as running, although running is not possible when in over-the-shoulder mode. If Hansen falls off the edge of the ship, he can hang onto the side as long as he has resistance left, but if he doesn't climb back aboard quickly enough, he will fall into the ocean.

The game does not feature an inventory, and neither health packs nor ammo can be stockpiled. Health packs are used immediately upon collection, and no more ammo can be collected than the capacity of the specific weapon. Players can find ammo and health packs distributed throughout the game at certain predetermined locations and also by looting the bodies of fallen enemies.

== Plot ==
A Navy SEAL team deploys on a Russian whaler, the Eastern Spirit, in the Bering Strait, but is quickly torn apart by unseen creatures. CIA Special Agent Jason Bennett, remotely supervising the mission, orders any nearby government ships to investigate. His call is answered by a US Coast Guard ship, the USCGC Ravenswood, which heads to the Spirit; a rescue team boards but is similarly wiped out in short order, leaving only Tom Hansen, ex-U.S. Army Special Forces turned Coast Guardsman. Unable to be extracted due to stormy seas, he investigates the ship alone. Exploring the Spirit, Hansen fights panicked Russian mercenaries and encounters countless mutilated corpses, including his superior, Lt. Lansing. He discovers the root of the disaster: parasitic creatures known as "Exocels," which were accidentally discovered on a Russian oil rig, the Star of Sakhalin, owned by Col. Dmitriy Yusupov, a member of the Russian mafia and staffed by Major Yuri Anischenko and his mercenaries. Yusupov brought Dr. Viktor Kamsky to the Star to experiment with infecting various species with Exocel serum. This led to the discovery that Exocels could re-animate recently deceased humans and the creation of an antidote to counter infection. Hansen heads to the radio room to request help, but Bennett answers instead, saying that Yusupov is on board; if Hansen can capture him for questioning, the CIA will get him off the ship.

Hansen locates Yusupov, who tells him that Anna Kamsky, Viktor's daughter, is onboard and must be saved. She was on the Star to be used as blackmail so Viktor would turn Exocels into biological weapons. Eventually, Viktor and his colleague, Dr. Pavel Bakharev, began live human infection, making the Exocels more deadly; the Spirit was on its way from the Star to collect the next batch of human specimens supplied by the mafia when the outbreak occurred. An Exocel then bursts out of Yusupov's chest, killing him. Hansen finds Anna, and they try to contact Viktor on the rig, but Bakharev tells Anna that Viktor is missing and pleads with her not to return. Determined, Anna and Hansen pilot the ship, but rough seas prevent docking. They plot a collision course, aiming to jump from the crow's nest on impact; Hansen makes the jump, Anna falls into the sea, and Hansen passes out after jumping in to try and save her. He washes up onto the rig and is infected while unconscious. Hansen stumbles into Bakharev, who gives him the antidote. Bennett had mentioned a radio jammer on the rig, but Bakharev says that to disable it, they need Anischenko to get past its retinal scanner; Bakharev is then dragged into a duct and killed. Hansen kills the remaining mercenaries and Anischenko, removing his eye and using it to deactivate the jammer. With comms now clear, Bennett demands that Hansen find Viktor's laptop and transmit any research, which Hansen accepts in exchange for Anna's safety. Meanwhile, Anna is rescued from the sea by a large humanoid creature; Hansen watches on a monitor as she is left in a lab and is infected. He races to give Anna an antidote, getting infected himself a second time, but chooses to cure her before passing out; Anna saves him in return.

Hansen discovers that Viktor infected himself with a strain of Exocel DNA, metamorphosing into the massive creature, desiring to spread it to the world, believing that the parasite holds the key to the next step of human evolution. Hansen finds Viktor's laptop and transmits only the antidote data, unwilling to let anyone weaponize the parasite, which infuriates Bennett. Hansen and Anna plan to destroy the rig using explosives; he learns that Kamsky had gone insane after infecting himself, deliberately releasing the parasite on both the Star and the Spirit. With the charges planted, Hansen and Anna run to the helipad but are attacked by Viktor, aiming to keep Anna with him. Hansen narrowly defeats the monster and escapes with Anna on a repaired helicopter as the rig explodes below them.

== Development ==
Cold Fear was first announced at E3 in 2004 when the title was included on a list of upcoming games. According to Sony, the game was set to be published by Namco and was originally conceived, before any public announcements, as a 3D action game set in the Time Crisis series of games. On October 6, however, Ubisoft announced they would be publishing the Darkworks developed game in March 2005 for PlayStation 2, Xbox and PC. The game would be Ubisoft's first horror game, and Darkworks' second game, after Alone in the Dark: The New Nightmare in 2001. A playable demo version was released in December.

To make the Eastern Spirit roll realistically in the storm, the developers had to write a completely new program. They found that making the ship move was easy, but getting it to respond to storm conditions was much more complex. As such, they created a complete roll editor, called the Darkwave editor, which allowed them to control the pitch (when the ship moves on the horizontal axis) and the roll (when it moves on the vertical axis) separately. The combination of moving the ship on both axes allowed the developers to create realistic ship movements. This in turn allowed them to time the exact movement of the ship to coincide with what was happening in the game without having to use a cutscene. However, creating such a realistic movement system led to camera problems. According to programmer, Claude Levastre, early in development, "the camera was constantly going through the walls because of the roll movement. So we had to develop an inertia-control system for the camera, just as if a cameraman is using a steadicam behind the hero". Another change brought about by the ship's motion was that initially, the movement patterns of inanimate objects on the ship were scripted, but this was later replaced with real physics.

"Cold Fear is a visually spectacular, action horror game. It blends some of what you'd expect from the genre with a unique camera system and a world that pitches and rolls with the waves. The result is a game which is set to change the genre".

— Criterion Software; makers of RenderWare

The ship's constant movement also impacted character animation. Once the ship's movement reached a certain angle, Hansen and any other characters on deck start to slide, and have to compensate in whatever direction was necessary relative to their position. According to Levastre, this meant Hansen required nine times the animations usually seen in third-person games (center, front, back, left, right and four intermediary positions). Ultimately, Hansen had two hundred and fifty separate animations, and most of the non-player characters had one hundred and fifty. According to Antonin Delboy, lead animator on the game, "all the technical decisions were taken in favor of animation, both in terms of quality and quantity, which is very rare on this kind of project". Basic animation was produced with 3D Studio Max software. Inverse kinematics were then used to create the nine directional animations, with the engine calculating the level of character compensation depending on the angle of the ship. Each character movement is composed of basic animation and compensation animation, and Delboy says that in total, the game contains more than nine hundred animations, allowing for over five thousand possible movements. Levastre stated that "the interaction between the storm and the characters that are on the deck sometimes creates some really breathtaking moments. And on top of that, we managed to offer some really intense action sequences featuring far more enemies than in most horror games".

=== Music ===
Marilyn Manson contributed to a song to the game; "Use Your Fist and Not Your Mouth", from his 2003 album The Golden Age of Grotesque.

The soundtrack was composed by Tom Salta. Salta had been hired in November 2004, with his first finished track submitted on November 16. The completed score was handed in on December 23. According to Salta, he had to compose over twenty different individual pieces as well as music for nine cutscenes.

== Reception ==
Reception

Aggregate score
Aggregator	Score		
Aggregator	PC	PS2	Xbox
Metacritic	66/100	68/100	71/100

Review scores
Publication	Score		
Publication	PC	PS2	Xbox
Eurogamer			5/10
GameRevolution		B−	B−
GameSpot		6.9/10	7.2/10
GameSpy		3/5	3.5/5
IGN		7.2/10	7.6/10
Official U.S. PlayStation Magazine		3/5	
Official Xbox Magazine (US)			8.1/10
PC Gamer (US)	81%		

Cold Fear received "mixed or average reviews" on all three platforms; the PlayStation 2 version holds an aggregate score of 68 out of 100 on Metacritic, based on thirty-nine reviews, the Xbox version 71 out of 100, based on forty-one reviews, and the PC version 66 out of 100, based on thirteen reviews.

Eurogamer's Kristan Reed was unimpressed with the game, calling it "a bit half-baked". He praised the opening of the game, arguing that, like Hansen himself, the player feels a strong sense of disorientation as they get used to being on the ship in the middle of a storm. However, he felt the strong opening soon gives way to clichés. He was highly critical of the absence of a map, arguing that because the environments all look similar, getting lost is a regular occurrence. GameSpot's Carrie Gouskos scored the PlayStation 2 version 6.9 out of 10 and the Xbox version 7.2 out of 10. She argued: "Atmospherically, Cold Fear is derivative and predictable, which is a shame considering that it is, at times, an enjoyable action game". Although she praised the outdoor scenes on the boat, she felt there were not enough of them, with too many "generic indoor locations". She was also highly critical of the lack of a map and the autosave feature, feeling the save points were unevenly distributed.

GameSpy's Will Tuttle scored the PlayStation 2 version 3 out of 5 and the Xbox version 3.5 out of 5. He praised the setting, atmosphere and over-the-shoulder camera, but was critical of the lack of a map. He called the game as a solid little thriller. Game Revolution's JP Hurh gave the game a B−. He too criticized the length of the game, the lack of a map and the autosave feature, which he found too random. He praised the graphics and sound, but concluded: "With so much attention paid to the environments, Darkworks almost made a great game. Unfortunately, it's only half a great game [...] The ending as well as many portions along the way feel rushed". IGN's Ed Lewis scored the PlayStation 2 version 7.2 out of 10 and the Xbox version 7.6 out of 10. He praised the over-the-shoulder camera and the setting, but also criticized the lack of a map.

=== Sales ===
The game was met with extremely poor sales figures. By February 2006, it had sold only 70,000 units across all three platforms in the US.

== Film adaptation ==
In April 2006, Variety reported that Avatar Films and Sekretagent Productions had co-purchased the rights for a feature film adaptation of the game. However, there have since been no further developments, with the project presumably cancelled.

== See also ==
- 2005 in video games
