= 38th Parallel (band) =

American Christian rock band

- Origin: Ames, Iowa
- Genres: Christian rock; alternative rock; rap rock; nu metal
- Years active: 2000 - 2006
- Label: Squint Records
- Spinoffs: Ministry of Magic
- Members: Mark Jennings; Nate Rippke; Jason Munday; Jeff Barton; Aaron Nordyke
- Past members: Shane Moe (2001–2003)

38th Parallel was a Christian rock band formed in Ames, Iowa. Before being signed they received extensive airplay in Iowa markets alongside other CCM Artists. Unknown to them, they were entered into a talent search contest for Christian music giant Word Records created by former A&R Alvin V. Williams. Alvin Williams signed the group to Word Records, but they soon signed and released their first project on, Squint Entertainment.

Their name is a play on the 38th parallel north, which divides North Korea from South Korea. Their first album, Turn the Tides, was released in 2002, following the band's nationwide tour with artists Skillet and The Benjamin Gate. The album received a Dove Award nomination in 2003 for Rock Album of the Year.

Following the disbandment of 38th Parallel, vocalist Mark Jennings, guitarist Jason Munday, and drummer Aaron Nordyke formed the Harry Potter-themed electronica band Ministry of Magic.

In 2005, 38th Parallel made available the demo tracks for their second album that were never finished or released.

On August 2, 2006, band member Mark Jennings announced, via the band's MySpace blog, that it is unlikely that 38th Parallel will release another album. The decision was influenced by shifting priorities in the personal lives of the members such as marriage.

On June 16, 2007, 4 out of the 5 members of 38th Parallel played 5 songs at Bash on the Farm in Garner, IA.

Currently, Mark Jennings, Jason Munday, and Aaron Nordyke are all still involved with the wizard rock band called Ministry of Magic, along with Luke Conard, Ryan Seiler, and Jeremy Jennings. They currently have four albums (The Tri Wizard LP, Goodbye Privet Drive, Onward and Upward, Magic is Might, and "Songs from Gringott's Vault") and perform when possible.

== Former members ==
- Mark Jennings — vocals
- Nate Rippke — vocals
- Shane Moe — guitars 2001–2003
- Jason Munday — guitars since 2003
- Jeff Barton — bass guitar
- David Baker — guitars 1999-2001
- Aaron Nordyke — drums
- Erik Holt — guitars 1998-2000

== Discography ==
- 2002: Turn the Tides
