= Red Steel 2 =

2010 video game by Ubisoft Paris

- Developer: Ubisoft Paris
- Publisher: Ubisoft
- Director: Jason Vandenberghe
- Producer: Bruno Galet
- Designer: Roman Campos-Oriola
- Programmer: Stéphane Lavergne
- Writers: David Neiss; Jason VandenBerghe
- Composer: Tom Salta
- Engine: LyN
- Platform: Wii
- Release: NA: March 23, 2010; AU: March 25, 2010; EU: March 26, 2010
- Genre: First-person shooter/hack and slash
- Mode: Single-player

Red Steel 2 is a first-person action video game developed by Ubisoft Paris and published by Ubisoft. It is a standalone sequel to Red Steel. Released worldwide for the Wii video game console in March 2010, the game received generally positive reviews.

== Gameplay ==
Like its predecessor, Red Steel 2 is played in a first-person perspective where players can alternate between shooting and sword fighting, thus making it a hybrid hack and slash first-person shooter. Players are able to fight up to six enemies on-screen, though enemy packs can go up to twenty, and can deflect opponents' bullets with their swords. Tougher enemies have specific vulnerabilities that can only be exploited through the use of Wii MotionPlus technology; some enemies can parry off sword attacks with a defensive stance that the player must circumvent either with a slash parallel with the enemy's blade or three consecutive heavy strikes performed with large, fast swings of the Wii Remote, and some enemies wear armor that makes them immune to damage unless they are removed with heavy strikes. Attacking enemies in certain ways will stun them, giving the player a brief chance to finish them off with a particular Wii Remote gesture. The player begins each enemy encounter with full health that automatically replenishes once all enemies are defeated; should the enemies overwhelm the player to the point where all health is lost, the game ends and play can be resumed from the last checkpoint passed.

As the player progresses through the main missions, new techniques, armor, and weapons become available for purchase from safe houses established by non-player characters who ally with the main protagonist, but are not considered part of his clan, while additional side missions, represented as wanted posters in the safe houses, are available to play, earning the player a monetary reward upon their completion. Money can also be earned by destroying many small objects throughout the game world with equipped weapons, opening chests or defeating enemies, with double money earned for performing finishers correctly and triple for doing so with a combo. New techniques involve inputting a series of attacks that can significantly damage, stun or launch enemies into the air, and every time one is purchased, the player must go to a training area in the current safe house to practice it. Another source of money is a separate challenge mode that allows players to revisit previously cleared story chapters.

Red Steel 2 is the first game besides Wii Sports Resort to use the Wii Motion Plus Accessory, as well as only one of three third-party Wii games to require it, with the others being My Personal Golf Trainer and B-Units: Build It!. The game features an expansive amount of movement with the Wii MotionPlus allowing it to be quite an interactive game, including certain hands-on minigames such as opening combination lock safes.

== Plot ==
=== Setting ===
Red Steel 2 does not continue the story of its predecessor, but adapts the common theme of mixing together ranged and melee combat as well as Eastern and Western culture. It is set in a more make-believe and somewhat more technically advanced world, where mysterious warrior clans employ both samurai and cowboy weapons and fighting styles in tandem, similar to the PlayStation 2 video game Samurai Western, in a Wild West-like North America carved up into territories. The game begins in the fictional city of Caldera in Nevada, where lawless "Jackals" roam not long after the city's entrusted protectors, the Kusagari, are decimated by their rival, the Katakara, in a vicious clan war.

=== Story ===
The game begins as an unnamed Hero, the last member of the Kusagari Clan, is being dragged across the desert, tied to the back of a motorcycle. He manages to break free, but Payne, the leader of the Jackals – a vast gang of thugs, murderers and thieves – steals the Hero's katana. While running from the Jackals with only his trusty .357 Longarm through the city of Caldera, the Hero rescues his old swordsmaster Jian who was to soon be executed by the Jackals. After the rescue, Jian allows the Hero to borrow his sword until the Hero can recover his own from Payne.

The Hero meets up with Tamiko, a member of his clan's research division, as well as Caldera's sheriff and Tamiko's father, Judd. They provide information for the Hero to help him track down Payne, while sabotaging the Jackals' operations in the Upper City, as well as meeting a fight club-operating businessman named Songan. The Hero eventually locates and defeats Payne in the Jackals' hideout, Rojo House, recovering his katana during the battle. He interrogates Payne and, before killing him by throwing him off a ledge, learns that his entire clan had been annihilated by a man named Shinjiro.

The Hero travels to the Lower City, encountering another rival clan called the Katakara. He finds Shinjiro in the city's Kusagari Temple and the two swordsmen fight. After a fierce battle, the Hero breaks Shinjiro's katana and pushes him to the edge of the Temple's roof. However, before the Hero can strike his foe down, a mysterious ninja saves Shinjiro. Jian then tells the Hero that the katanas of the Kusagari, called Sora Katanas, have great unpredictable power and that the method to make these is known only to them, and Shinjiro, who trained with the Kusagari as a child, plans to make more of them.

Following a tip from Judd, the Hero discovers Shinjiro trying to escape the city on a train and manages to board it before it leaves. After the Hero fights his way through the train, which is full of ninjas and Katakara, he finds Shinjiro atop the front car; the "escape attempt" is revealed to be a trap. As the Hero approaches the front car, Shinjiro detaches the front car from the rest of the train. Shinjiro then throws a grenade to kill the Hero and destroy the rest of the train. The Hero survives, but is forced to walk through the desert for three days before finding a small ghost town. While exploring the town, the Hero discovers Songan, who explains that the ghost town is a Jackal ammo dump. The Hero drives off the Jackals and survives an attack by a Katakara force, led by the lieutenant Calhoun.

After reestablishing communications with Tamiko, Judd, and Jian, the Hero learns that the trio have tracked Shinjiro to the isolated mining community of Rattlesnake Canyon. The Hero then takes Songan's advice and uses an old locomotive in the town's deserted train depot to travel there and is nearly killed when Shinjiro blows up a bridge up ahead. While exploring the Canyon, the Hero is attacked by the leader of the Katakara, Okaji, but manages to defeat him, only for him to return from the dead. Following Tamiko's plan, the Hero then uses explosives stolen from the mining quarry to break into the Canyon's Kusagari Temple, taken over by Shinjiro. This temple has a passageway leading to one of Songan's casinos and a pulley-raised bridge to Shinjiro's hideout, Tiger's Nest. Just as the Hero is about to ask Songan about how to get into Tiger's Nest, he then betrays the Hero and his allies, Tamiko, Judd, and Jian, are captured, but Songan nevertheless helps him lower the bridge. At Tiger's Nest, Shinjiro demands the Hero's katana in exchange for his friends. As the Hero is about to give it to him, the two engage in a gun duel, where Tamiko is shot.

The Hero chases Shinjiro through Tiger's Nest and eventually engages in a rematch with Okaji, whom he finally kills by dropping him off a cliff. He then hunts Shinjiro on a remote mountain outside the Nest, who then taunts the Hero about how the capture of his allies helped him rebuild his sword and uses explosives and henchmen in one final effort to stop the Hero from reaching him. When that fails, Shinjiro, now adorned in menacing armor, draws out a newly forged katana for a final showdown with the Hero atop a high cliff. The Hero bests him in the intense, ensuing duel, but a wounded Shinjiro warns him that other clans will covet the power of the Sora Katana before the Hero tells him that history will forget him and finishes him off by stabbing him in the heart. As Shinjiro perishes, the Hero breaks the sword in two and tosses the hilt end off the cliff in an effort to deter the clans from learning more about this weapon, before looking on to see the sun rise.

== Development ==
Red Steel 2 features a vastly different art style from its predecessor.

Development of Red Steel 2 began in the summer of 2008. Red Steel 2 was announced by Ubisoft executive director, Alain Corre on July 28. The game uses Nintendo's new accessory, Wii MotionPlus and was included in a bundle. It was developed using the proprietary LyN game engine.

Red Steel 2 features stylized, cel-shaded graphics, in contrast to its predecessor's more realistic aesthetic. The visual style is similar to Ubisoft Paris' own XIII, released in 2003. The game is also free of graphic violence, like its predecessor, save for occasional unrealistic blood-like splash effects when enemies are slashed or finished off with a stab, before vanishing in a cloud of dust upon defeat. Creative director Jason Vandenberghe justified the removal of graphic violence because he felt that bloodshed would make the Hero appear less heroic and cited how stories about iconic action folk heroes like Robin Hood and Zorro, who influenced and inspired the Hero's concept and creation, would become distasteful if their dispatching of foes were told in more graphic detail.

An early version of the game that Ubisoft conceived and later abandoned out of dissatisfaction before the Wii MotionPlus' announcement was planned to have a setting similar to the first game and support online multiplayer via Nintendo Wi-Fi Connection. Vandeberghe also explained that the decision to make the sequel's setting completely different from the first game mainly pivoted upon the need to fully capitalize on and play to the strengths of the system, citing how the first game's effort to reproduce realistic, urban environments hurt the gameplay and controls, particularly the sword fighting. When it came to carrying over the recurring theme of mixing Eastern and Western culture, his approach for doing so would be to juxtapose elements from both rather than closely fusing them together. One example of this was having the Hero wield both a katana and a revolver in tandem, the latter which Vandeberghe felt was a well-contrasting counterpart to the former in a few ways and influenced his decision to make the game set in a Wild West-style world.

One feature that did not carry over from the first game was a multiplayer mode. Vandenberghe explained that his development team did explore the possibilities of including one, but determined that it would never fit in the development time window, and that they preferred to deliver a great single player experience over a mediocre multiplayer game. He also stated that plans to enhance the challenge mode by adding new enemies and unique objectives were also similarly scrapped due to technical and developmental obstacles.

== Reception ==
Reception

Aggregate score
| Aggregator | Score |
|---|---|
| Metacritic | 80/100 |

Review scores
| Publication | Score |
|---|---|
| 1Up.com | C+ |
| Destructoid | 8.5/10 |
| Edge | 7/10 |
| Eurogamer | 7/10 |
| Famitsu | 9/10, 8/10, 7/10, 7/10 |
| Game Informer | 8/10 |
| GamePro | 3.5/5 |
| GameSpot | 7.5/10 |
| GameTrailers | 8.6/10 |
| GameZone | 8.5/10 |
| IGN | (US) 8.6/10 (UK) 8.5 of 10 (AU) 8.4 of 10 |
| Nintendo Power | 8/10 |
| The Daily Telegraph | 7/10 |
| The Escapist | 4/5 |

Red Steel 2 received favorable reviews according to video game review aggregator website Metacritic. IGN praised the "awesome style and energetic gameplay" and called it "one of the top titles on Wii". Official Nintendo Magazine praised the MotionPlus controls, visuals and audio, but criticised the mission design, referring to it as being "average". Eurogamer praised the "thrilling set pieces" but called the game's character "flawed, certainly, but entirely honorable with it". 1UP.com were considerably less impressed, stating that while "occasionally exhilarating" the game was "mostly unremarkable". GamesRadar praised the controls and "the engaging, intuitive combat". GamesRadar also noted that the game was drastically superior to Red Steel, noting that there was "no comparison between the two". Classic Game Room received the game well. Bussler claimed that this was the best motion controlled first person shooter that "I ever played".

Not all non-video game publications gave the game moderate success. The Escapist gave it four stars out of five and said: "Over three years after the Wii hit store shelves, Red Steel 2 finally delivers the motion-controlled swordplay we expected from the original Red Steel, and it more than makes up for any niggling flaws in the level design". The Daily Telegraph gave it seven out of ten and called it "effortlessly likable". Chris Kohler of Wired also gave it seven stars out of ten, saying: "I've never played anything quite like Red Steel 2, which lets you use swords and guns simultaneously, switching back and forth between wild swinging and precise aiming". He criticized some occasional lapses in the game's technical stability, such as rare game-crashing bugs and occasional moments where the game is forced to halt briefly to read the disc. The A.V. Club gave it a C+: "Though the pesky lag is largely gone, all too often, gameplay still devolves into breathless, embarrassing exercises in flailing".

Ubisoft originally expected to sell 1 million copies of Red Steel 2, but after poor sales of James Cameron's Avatar: The Game, they slashed their sales predictions in half. According to Jason VendenBerghe at his keynote speech at the 2010 European game developers conference, Red Steel 2 has sold approximately 270,000 copies worldwide.

== Future ==
In April 2010, a French website spread a rumor that a sequel was in development, according to a Nintendo magazine. According to the rumor, the game would make use of the now-cancelled Wii Vitality Sensor, and a further rumor claimed that the game would also be Wii exclusive as before. Vandenberghe expressed interest in making the sequel and previously floated the possibility of bringing the Red Steel series to the PlayStation 3 and Xbox 360 when motion-control add-ons for those consoles, the PlayStation Move and Xbox Kinect respectively, were announced during Red Steel 2's development, but ultimately concluded that the current state of the motion control market does not yet justify continuing the series. He then confirmed that he wanted to take advantage of the eventually-cancelled accessory if a third game were to be made. There has been no further word on the possibility of a sequel after Nintendo shifted focus towards subsequent successors of the Wii.
