= Ubisoft Reflections =

British video game developer

Ubisoft Reflections Limited
- Logo since 2017

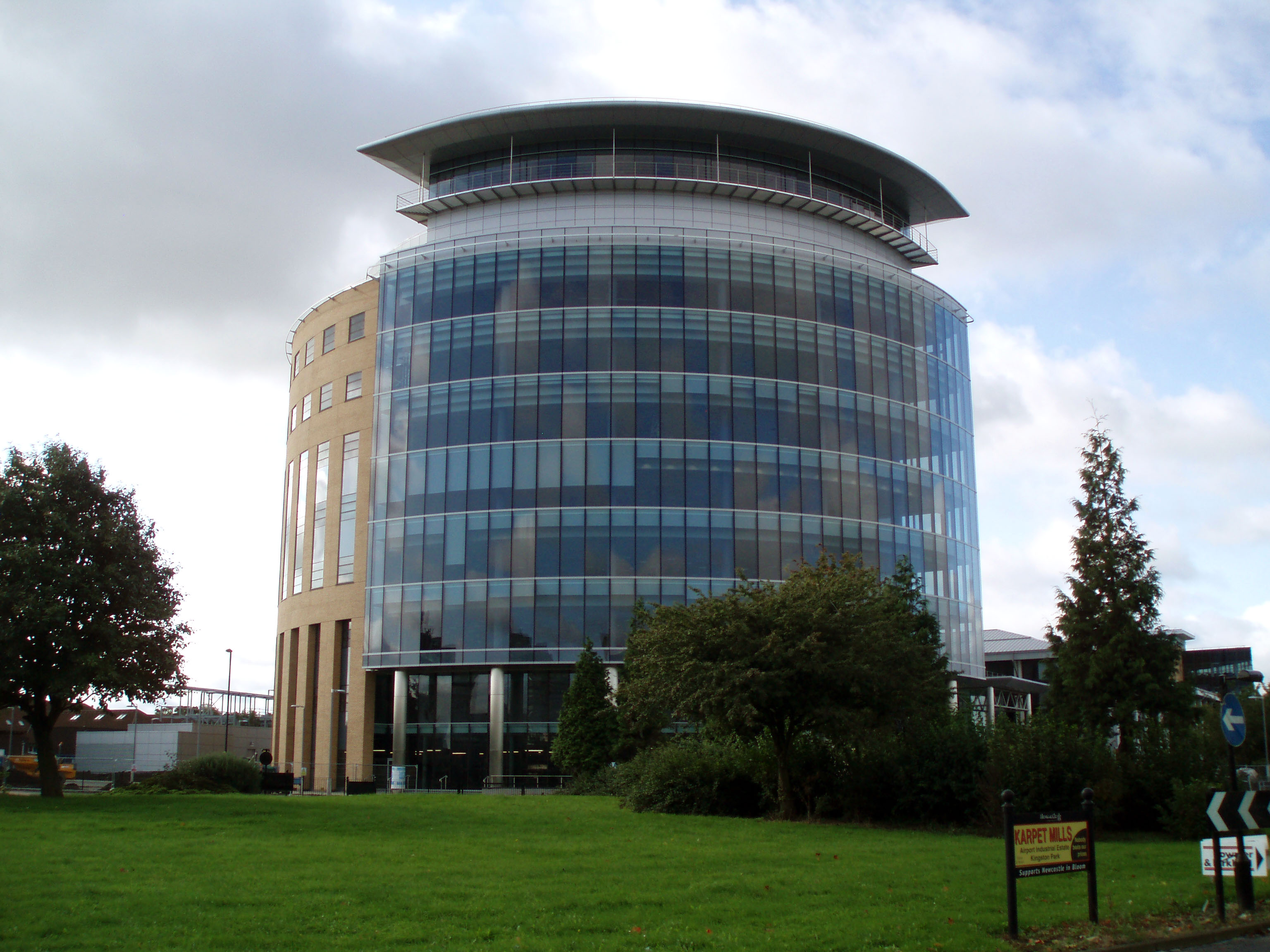
- Partnership House in Newcastle upon Tyne
- Formerly: Reflections (1984–1998); Reflections Interactive (1998–2006)
- Type: Subsidiary
- Industry: Video games
- Founded: 1984; 42 years ago
- Founders: Martin Edmondson; Nicholas Chamberlain
- Headquarters: Partnership House, Newcastle upon Tyne, England
- Key people: Michael Burnham (Studio Manager)
- Products: Shadow of the Beast series; Destruction Derby series; Driver series; Just Dance series; Tom Clancy series
- Number of employees: 240+ (2018)
- Parent: Atari, Inc. (1998–2006); Ubisoft (2006–present)
- Website: reflections.ubisoft.com

Ubisoft Reflections Limited (formerly Reflections and Reflections Interactive) is a British video game developer and a studio of Ubisoft based in Newcastle upon Tyne. Founded in 1984 by Martin Edmondson and Nicholas Chamberlain, the studio focuses on racing games and it is best known for creating the award-winning Driver series. Reflections was acquired by GT Interactive in 1998 – which later turned into Atari Inc. – and sold to Ubisoft in 2006. The company worked in close cooperation with sister studio Ubisoft Leamington, until its closure in 2025.

== History ==
Martin Edmondson and Nicholas Chamberlain started developing games for the BBC Micro under the moniker "Reflections" in 1984. Their first game was a Paperboy clone called Paper-Round that took two years to develop but was never released. While working on that game, it started Ravenskull which would be its first published game, released in 1986 by Superior Software. This was followed by Codename: Droid and an Acorn Electron conversion of Stryker's Run in 1987.

The name Reflections was first used for their 1989 hit Amiga game, Shadow of the Beast, published by Psygnosis which spawned two sequels. The original Amiga game was partially written by Paul Howarth, and started out life as a parallax test of the blitter of the Amiga's Agnus chip; Paul later went on to work for Deep Red Games, a UK video game company based in Milton Keynes. A number of other Amiga and Atari ST games followed including Ballistix (1989), Awesome (1990) and Brian the Lion (1994). In 1995, it became known for Destruction Derby, which was critically acclaimed for its realistic physics and destruction, which later become Reflections' specialty. Due to the success, the game had four more sequels over the years.

On 9 January 1999, it was announced that Reflections had been acquired by GT Interactive in 1998, for a reported 2.7 million shares of common stock, which was valued at around US$14.17 million. Reflections became well known for the game Driver, which was inspired by '70s cop shows like Starsky and Hutch and movies like Bullitt and The Driver. It has been followed by four sequels and four spin-offs. The company was subsequently renamed Reflections Interactive.

In 2004, studio founder Martin Edmondson left Reflections after the concepting stage of Driver: Parallel Lines, and sued Atari due to "constructive unfair dismissal as a result of Reflections alleged repudiatory breach of a contract of employment that necessitated Mr. Edmondson's resignation." Martin's brother, Gareth Edmondson, took his place as the studio manager. In July 2006, Atari announced that it had transferred all of the staff and most of the assets of Reflections Interactive Limited, including the intellectual property and technology rights to the Driver series, to Ubisoft for US$24 million.

Studio manager Gareth Edmondson, left Reflections after more than a ten-year presence at the studio in November 2011, two months after the launch of Driver: San Francisco. It was announced in February 2013, that Pauline Jacquey had been hired as new managing director.

In May 2013, Ubisoft Reflections announced that it was working on a new game, and that Ubisoft planned to announce the game at E3 2013. On 10 June 2013, during Ubisoft's press conference, it was revealed that Reflections was working with developer Ivory Tower on the racing game The Crew.

Reflections then started to take on more support work for other developers' games. In February 2014, it was announced that the studio would assist Ubisoft Massive in the development of Tom Clancy's The Division. Watch Dogs, released in May 2014, from Ubisoft's Montreal and Toronto studios, began life as a new entry in the Driver series before becoming an original IP. Reflections provided development support, handling the game's driving missions, among other elements. The studio returned for the 2016 sequel.

In 2015, Reflections released Grow Home, a procedurally animated climbing game originally developed as a side project by members of the team. A sequel, Grow Up, was released in 2016.

In January 2017, with the acquisition of FreeStyle Games, Richard Blenkinsop was named managing director of Reflections and the newly renamed Ubisoft Leamington. In March 2018, it was announced that Reflections, and six other studios, would work on The Division 2.

In February 2020, following the studio's transition to a support team, Reflections reported a 10% rise in revenue. In July, the studio expanded to a third floor at its headquarters in Partnership House. That September, Ubisoft announced that Red Storm and Reflections would be working on Oculus VR games based on its Assassin's Creed and Splinter Cell franchises. However, the Splinter Cell VR game was later cancelled in 2022. Assassin's Creed Nexus VR was released in November 2023.

Blenkinsop retired in 2021 and was replaced by Lisa Opie as managing director of both studios that May.

In January 2025, Ubisoft Reflections was downsized. At the same time, the Leamington office, which Reflections frequently collaborated with, was closed. When combined with layoffs in Düsseldorf and Stockholm, 185 employees were affected.

== Games developed ==
Year	Title	Platform(s)	Publisher(s)
1986	Ravenskull	Acorn Electron, BBC Micro	Superior Software
1987	Codename: Droid	Acorn Electron, BBC Micro	Superior Software
1987	Stryker's Run	Acorn Electron	Superior Software
1989	Ballistix	Amiga, Atari ST	Psygnosis
1989	Shadow of the Beast	Amiga	Psygnosis
1990	Shadow of the Beast II	Amiga, Atari ST	Psygnosis
1990	Awesome	Amiga, Atari ST	Psygnosis
1992	Shadow of the Beast III	Amiga	Psygnosis
1994	Brian the Lion	Amiga	Psygnosis
1995	Destruction Derby	MS-DOS, PlayStation, Sega Saturn	Psygnosis
1996	Destruction Derby 2	MS-DOS, PlayStation, Microsoft Windows	Psygnosis
1997	Thunder Truck Rally	MS-DOS, PlayStation, Microsoft Windows	Psygnosis
1999	Driver	macOS, PlayStation, Microsoft Windows	GT Interactive
2000	Driver 2	PlayStation	Infogrames
2002	Stuntman	PlayStation 2	Infogrames
2004	Driv3r	PlayStation 2, Microsoft Windows, Xbox	Atari
2006	Driver: Parallel Lines	PlayStation 2, Xbox	Atari
2007	Driver: Parallel Lines	Wii, Microsoft Windows	Ubisoft
2007	Driver 76	PlayStation Portable	Ubisoft
2008	Emergency Heroes	Wii	Ubisoft
2009	Monster 4x4: Stunt Racer	Wii	Ubisoft
2011	Driver: San Francisco	macOS, PlayStation 3, Wii, Microsoft Windows, Xbox 360	Ubisoft
2011	Just Dance 3	PlayStation 3	Ubisoft
2012	Just Dance 4	PlayStation 3, Wii, Wii U, Xbox 360	Ubisoft
2013	Just Dance 2014	PlayStation 3, PlayStation 4, Wii, Wii U, Xbox 360, Xbox One	Ubisoft
2014	Just Dance 2015	PlayStation 3, PlayStation 4, Wii, Wii U, Xbox 360, Xbox One	Ubisoft
2014	The Crew	PlayStation 4, Microsoft Windows, Xbox One, Xbox 360	Ubisoft
2015	Grow Home	Microsoft Windows, PlayStation 4	Ubisoft
2016	Grow Up	Microsoft Windows, PlayStation 4, Xbox One	Ubisoft
2016	Just Dance 2017	PlayStation 3, PlayStation 4, Xbox 360, Xbox One, Wii, Wii U, Microsoft Windows	Ubisoft
2017	Just Dance 2017	Nintendo Switch	Ubisoft
2017	Atomega	Microsoft Windows	Ubisoft
2017	Ode	Microsoft Windows	Ubisoft
