= Grow Home =

2015 video game

- Developer: Ubisoft Reflections (Note: Ubisoft Pune helped with development of the PlayStation 4 version)
- Publisher: Ubisoft
- Producer: Pete Young
- Designer: Andrew Willans
- Artist: Jack Couvela
- Writer: Ian Mayor
- Composer: Lewis Griffin
- Engine: Unity
- Platforms: Microsoft Windows; PlayStation 4; Linux
- Release: Windows; February 4, 2015; PlayStation 4; September 1, 2015; Linux; November 10, 2015
- Genres: Adventure, platforming
- Mode: Single-player

Grow Home is an adventure platform video game developed by Ubisoft Reflections and published by Ubisoft. It was released for Microsoft Windows on February 4, 2015, and for PlayStation 4 on September 1, 2015. The game follows a robot named B.U.D., who is tasked with growing a plant that will oxygenate its home planet. Players explore an open world, moving B.U.D. and individually using each of its arms to climb and interact with objects.

Initially developed by a small team at Ubisoft Reflections for internal release, the game became popular between co-workers and was eventually planned for official release, confirmed in a blog post by Ubisoft on January 22, 2015. It was created using the Unity game engine, and contains procedural animation and physics-based gameplay, which allow the player's movements to adapt to the game's environment.

Grow Home received favorable reviews upon release, with critics praising its open world and visuals, while criticizing its short length. A sequel, titled Grow Up, was released on August 16, 2016. Atari acquired the IP from Ubisoft in 2025.

== Gameplay ==
B.U.D. climbing a Star Shoot

Grow Home is an adventure game played from a third person perspective. Players control a robot named B.U.D. (Botanical Utility Droid), and are tasked with oxygenating its homeworld by growing and climbing a "Star Plant", a giant beanstalk, and harvesting its seeds. Players are able to freely explore an open world, and have the ability to individually make B.U.D.'s left and right hands grab, with a button for each hand. The player can reach a small distance and grab onto any part of the environment, allowing them to push and climb objects. Throughout the game, B.U.D's ship computer entitled M.O.M. speaks to the player, informing them of gameplay objectives.

The game allows players to grow "Star Shoots" from the Star Plant, which act as platforms for the player to traverse. Star Shoots can only be grown for a limited amount of time, and their path of growth can be directed by the player. They can be used to carry the player to various floating islands found throughout the game world. Some islands, called "Energy Rocks", can be connected to Star Shoots to make the Star Plant grow along a set path. These Energy Rocks become more distant from the Star Plant as the game progresses.

Upon growing to certain heights, the Star Plant grows through larger floating islands. These islands, along with the smaller ones surrounding the Star Plant, contain power-up crystals which can be collected to provide B.U.D. with extra abilities. Creatures and other plant life can also be found throughout the game's islands, as well as environmental features, such as caves and water currents. Some parts of the environment, such as leaves growing off of both the Star Plant and Star Shoots that allow the player to jump to greater heights than normally possible, can affect how the player moves throughout the world. Teleportation pads allow the player to move around the world quickly and act as save points. The player also respawns at their last activated teleportation pad if they die, which can be caused by falling long distances, being in too much water for too long, or by the player making B.U.D. self-destruct. Additionally, players can scan various flora and fauna into the teleporters to retrieve data from them. Items can be picked up by the player and stored in B.U.D.'s backpack one at a time, such as flower parachutes that make the player fall more slowly towards the ground, and leaf gliders that allow the player to travel further through the air.

Once the player grows the Star Plant to 2000 metres and returns a seed to M.O.M., the main objective is completed, and the player is given the choice of collecting eight more seeds. Completing this final objective unlocks a special suit that allows the player to jump twice as high, and finishes the game. Players are free to explore the world after completion.

== Development ==
Grow Home began development as an experimental project created by an eight-person team at Ubisoft Reflections, initially being launched internally for the staff. After testing the project, management at Ubisoft decided to officially launch the title, which was developed into a full game inspired by Hitchhiker’s Guide to the Galaxy and WALL-E.

Grow Home has a minimalist, low poly graphical style. It uses procedural animation and physics-based gameplay, which allow objects and the player's actions to adapt to any part of the environment. The developers recommend using a gamepad to play the game, as it gives the player "the deepest connection to the gameplay mechanics". The game was created using the Unity engine and, unlike other Ubisoft titles, it does not require Uplay to run. After being announced in a post on the official Ubisoft blog on January 22, 2015, Grow Home was released on February 4, for Microsoft Windows via Valve's Steam service, as well as being released on September 1, for PlayStation 4. An OS X version was planned to be released if the PC version sold enough units. Ubisoft released multiple updates for the game following release, containing new missions, skins and bug fixes. It was however released for Linux on November 10, 2015.

On August 26, 2025, Atari SA acquired the intellectual property rights to both Grow Home and its sequel Grow Up, with plans to re-release the games on new platforms.

== Reception ==
Reception

Aggregate score
Aggregator	Score
Metacritic	(PC) 75/100 (PS4) 74/100

Review scores
Publication	Score
Destructoid	(PC) 8.5/10
Eurogamer	(PC) Recommended
Game Informer	(PC) 6/10
GameSpot	(PC) 8/10
GameTrailers	(PC) 8/10
Hardcore Gamer	(PC) 3/5
IGN	(PC) 8.8/10
PlayStation Official Magazine – UK	(PS4) 7/10
PC Gamer (UK)	(PC) 80%
PCGamesN	(PC) 9/10
Push Square	(PS4) 8/10
Shacknews	(PC) 6/10
VentureBeat	(PC) 65/100
Metro	(PC) 8/10

The PC version received "generally favorable reviews", while the PlayStation 4 version received "mixed or average reviews", according to the review aggregation website Metacritic.

The PC version's open world was highly regarded by critics. PC Gamer's Jordan Erica Webber stated that the game's joy is in discovery. Destructoid's Ben Davis said that he got "more than enough enjoyment out of exploring the world", and Eurogamer's reviewer Christian Donlan called the game's map wonderfully generous and varied. However, reviewers criticised the game's length, with Davis calling it relatively short and both Webber and Donlan stating that it should only take the player a couple of hours or less to complete the game's campaign, although Webber said that the game has a great pace. IGN's Brandin Tyrrel also said that there's little reason to return to the game after completing the main campaign.

The game's visuals were also commended, with Tyrrel calling the game's world gorgeous and vivid, as well as calling its procedurally generated animation a "fantastic example of how movement can speak volumes more than words". However, he also stated that the animation system sometimes caused B.U.D.'s limbs to knot themselves into a state of "unnatural contortion". Rock Paper Shotgun's John Walker said that the main character's movement is "deeply involved in the world", calling its animation the reason the game is "so special".

Critics were divided on the game's control scheme. Donlan wrote that Grow Home is the best rock-climbing game he has ever played, stating that the "initially bewildering" controls allow the player to move through the world "with real skill". Davis called it the most entertaining aspect of the game, but also stated that the walking controls were awkward at times. Webber said that the climbing controls caused her wrist strain, and that the walking controls were "cute until the first time you overshoot or go skidding off the edge".
