= Grow Up (video game) =

2016 video game

- Developer: Ubisoft Reflections (Note: Ubisoft Pune helped with development of the PlayStation 4 and Xbox One versions)
- Publisher: Ubisoft
- Engine: Unity
- Platforms: Microsoft Windows, PlayStation 4, Xbox One
- Release: 16 August 2016
- Genres: Adventure, platforming
- Mode: Single-player

Grow Up is an adventure platform video game developed by Ubisoft Reflections and published by Ubisoft. The game, which is the sequel to 2015's Grow Home, was released on 16 August 2016 for Microsoft Windows, PlayStation 4, and Xbox One. Atari acquired the IP rights to Grow Home and Grow Up from Ubisoft in 2025.

== Gameplay ==
Grow Up builds upon the gameplay of its predecessor, Grow Home, by once again putting players in control of a robot named B.U.D, who is able to climb on landscapes. While the game still features B.U.D's ability to direct the stalks of Starplants into energy sources to help them grow, the main goal of the game now is to recover parts of B.U.D's ship, M.O.M, which are spread across the planet after she crashed into the moon. New to the game is the ability to scan various plants, known as floraforms, which each have unique properties such as allowing B.U.D to jump high or launch into the air. Once a floraform has been scanned, B.U.D can plant a seed of it at any time to grow anywhere else. By finding ability capsules, B.U.D can obtain new abilities, such as a jetpack, gliding, and rolling into a ball, which can each be upgraded by collecting crystals hidden across the world. By completing challenges, which require B.U.D to go through multiple checkpoints within a time limit, the player can unlock optional B.U.D Suits, which each give B.U.D unique properties, such as a bee suit that attracts bugs or an aviator suit that increases gliding speed.

== Reception ==
Reception

Aggregate score
Aggregator	Score
Metacritic	(XOne) 74/100 (PC) 71/100 (PS4) 70/100

Review scores
Publication	Score
Destructoid	(XOne) 7/10
Eurogamer	(PS4) Recommended
GameSpot	(PS4) 5/10
Giant Bomb	3/5
Hardcore Gamer	(PS4) 3.5/5
IGN	(PC) 7.8/10
PlayStation Official Magazine – UK	(PS4) 8/10
Official Xbox Magazine (UK)	(XOne) 9/10
PC Gamer (UK)	(PC) 73%
Push Square	(PS4) 7/10
Shacknews	(PS4) 6/10
Digital Spy	(PS4) 3/5
Metro	(PS4) 7/10

Grow Up received "mixed or average" reviews on all platforms according to the review aggregation website Metacritic.
