= Turn the Tides =

Album by 38th Parallel

Studio album by 38th Parallel
- Released: September 10, 2002
- Studios: The Sound Kitchen Studios (Franklin, Tennessee): Note-On Studios; (New York City, New York)
- Genres: Christian rock; nu metal; rap metal
- Length: 34:11
- Label: Squint Entertainment
- Producers: Hugh Robertson, Barry Landis

38th Parallel chronology
| Let Go (2001) | Turn the Tides (2002) |

Professional ratings
Review scores
| Source | Rating |
|---|---|
| AllMusic | 2/5 stars |
| Christianity Today | 2/5 stars |
| Jesus Freak Hideout | 2/5 stars |
| Phantom Tollbooth | 3/5 stars |

Turn the Tides is the only studio album by Christian nu metal band 38th Parallel.

== Critical reception ==
Ashleigh Kittle writes in her AllMusic review, "38th Parallel offers listeners an edgy style, at times mixing elements of hip-hop with gentler melodies and harmonies."

J. D. of Jesus Freak Hideout writes, "While 38th is nothing new to our ears, they offer a decent debut with Turn the Tides and a positive release for those tired of the trite angst of secular counterparts."

Todd Hertz of Christianity Today ranks this album No. 11 in its Top 12 Christian Albums of 2002. The review says, "Turn the Tides is a terrific debut with tight hooks, head-bobbing rhythms, smooth vocals, and godly lyrics."

== Track listing ==
1. "Hear My Cry" - 2:58
2. "Turn the Tides" - 2:49
3. "Higher Ground" - 3:44
4. "Clouded" - 2:55
5. "Who Am I?" - 3:31
6. "Horizon" - 3:53
7. "State of Mind" - 3:53
8. "You Are My God" - 3:49
9. "Wither" - 3:39
10. "3 Times Denied" - 3:00
