= List of Prince of Persia media =

Prince of Persia is a media franchise that started with a series of video games created by Jordan Mechner, and has spawned a large number of games in different platforms, between ports, sequels and spin-offs. The original Prince of Persia game, with its more than 20 platform ports, is one of the most ported games in videogame history

== Video games ==
Titles in the Prince of Persia series
Year	Title	Developer	Sony	Microsoft	Nintendo	Apple	Other
1989	Prince of Persia	Broderbund	—N/a	—N/a	—N/a	Apple II	—N/a
1990	Prince of Persia	Broderbund	—N/a	MS-DOS	—N/a	—N/a	Amiga, Atari ST, Amstrad CPC, PC-98, Commodore 64 (2011)
1991	Prince of Persia	Broderbund	—N/a	—N/a	—N/a	—N/a	PC Engine, Turbografx-16 CD, SAM Coupé, X68000
1992	Prince of Persia	Broderbund	PS2^{6} (2003)	Xbox^{7} (2003)	Game Boy, NES, Super NES^{8}, GBC (1999), GameCube^{1} (2003), Wii^{4} (2010)	Classic Mac OS	Master System, Mega-CD, Game Gear, FM Towns
1993	Prince of Persia	Broderbund	—N/a	—N/a	—N/a	—N/a	Mega Drive
1993	Prince of Persia 2 The Shadow and the Flame	Brøderbund	—N/a	MS-DOS	—N/a	—N/a	—N/a
1994	Prince of Persia 2 The Shadow and the Flame	Brøderbund	—N/a	Xbox^{7} (2003)	—N/a	Classic Mac OS	—N/a
1995	Prince of Persia 2 The Shadow and the Flame	Brøderbund	—N/a	—N/a	Super NES	—N/a	—N/a
1999	Prince of Persia 3D; Arabian Nights	Red Orb Entertainment	—N/a	Windows	—N/a	—N/a	—N/a
2000	Prince of Persia 3D; Arabian Nights	Avalanche Software	—N/a	—N/a	—N/a	—N/a	Dreamcast
2003	The Sands of Time	Ubisoft Montreal	PS2, PS3^{9} (2010)	Xbox, Windows	GameCube, GBA	—N/a	—N/a
2004	Warrior Within	Ubisoft Montreal	PS2, PS3^{9} (2010)	Xbox, Windows	GameCube	—N/a	—N/a
2005	The Two Thrones	Ubisoft Montreal	PS2, PS3^{9} (2010)	Xbox, Windows	GameCube	OS X	—N/a
2005	Revelations^{2}	Pipeworks Software	PSP	—N/a	—N/a	—N/a	—N/a
2005	Battles of Prince of Persia	Ubisoft Montreal	—N/a	—N/a	DS	—N/a	—N/a
2007	Rival Swords^{5}	Pipeworks Software	PSP	—N/a	Wii	—N/a	—N/a
2007	Prince of Persia Classic^{3}	Gameloft	—N/a	Xbox 360 (XBLA)	—N/a	—N/a	—N/a
2008	Prince of Persia Classic^{3}	Ubisoft Sofia	PS3 (PSN)	—N/a	—N/a	—N/a	—N/a
2008	Prince of Persia	Ubisoft Montreal	PS3	Xbox 360, Windows	—N/a	OS X	—N/a
2008	The Fallen King	Ubisoft Casablanca	—N/a	—N/a	DS	—N/a	—N/a
2009	Epilogue (DLC)	Ubisoft Montreal	PS3 (PSN)	Xbox 360 (XBLA)	—N/a	—N/a	—N/a
2010	The Forgotten Sands	Ubisoft Montreal	PS3	Xbox 360, Windows	—N/a	—N/a	—N/a
2010	The Forgotten Sands (Wii exclusive game)	Ubisoft Quebec	—N/a	—N/a	Wii	—N/a	—N/a
2010	The Forgotten Sands (PSP exclusive game)	Ubisoft Quebec	PSP	—N/a	—N/a	—N/a	—N/a
2010	The Forgotten Sands (DS exclusive game)	Ubisoft Casablanca	—N/a	—N/a	DS	—N/a	—N/a
2020	Prince of Persia: The Dagger of Time^{10}	Ubisoft Blue Byte	—N/a	—N/a	—N/a	—N/a	VR Escape Room
2024	Prince of Persia: The Lost Crown	Ubisoft Montpellier	PS4, PS5	Xbox One, Xbox Series, Windows	Switch	—N/a	—N/a
2025	The Rogue Prince of Persia^{11}	Evil Empire	PS5	Xbox Series, Windows	Switch, Switch 2	—N/a	—N/a

Notes

1. The Mac version of Prince of Persia is included as an unlockable bonus in the GameCube version of The Sands of Time.
2. A port of Warrior Within.
3. An upscaled re-release of the original Prince of Persia with new remade graphics.
4. Mac OS version included as extra in the Wii game The Forgotten Sands, with a remapped control scheme.
5. A port of The Two Thrones.
6. The PS2 version of The Sands of Time includes the Mac OS version of Prince of Persia classic game as an unlockable bonus.
7. The NTSC Xbox version of The Sands of Time include the Mac OS versions of both Prince of Persia and Prince of Persia 2 classic games as unlockable bonuses.
8. The SNES version of Prince of Persia has slightly different level designs with enhanced graphics and 20 levels instead of the original 12, plus several "training" stages.
9. HD remasters of The Sands of Time, Warrior Within and The Two Thrones are included in the Prince of Persia Trilogy collection on PS3.
10. A VR game developed to be played at escape rooms.
11. The game was released as an early access game in May 2024.

=== Mobile games ===
Mobile games in the Prince of Persia series
Year	Title	Developer	Platform
2003	Harem Adventures^{1}	Gameloft	Java ME
2003	The Sands of Time^{5}	Gameloft	Java ME
2004	Warrior Within^{5}	Gameloft	Java ME
2005	The Two Thrones^{5}	Gameloft	Java ME
2007	Prince of Persia Classic^{2}	Gameloft	Java ME
2008	Prince of Persia^{5}	Gameloft	Java ME
2010	The Forgotten Sands^{5}	Gameloft	Java ME
2010	Prince of Persia Retro^{3}	Ubisoft	iOS
2010	Warrior Within^{4}	Ubisoft	iOS
2012	Prince of Persia Classic HD^{2}	Ubisoft	iOS, Android
2013	The Shadow and the Flame^{6}	Ubisoft	iOS, Android
2018	Prince of Persia Escape^{7}	Ubisoft, Ketchapp, Estoty	iOS, Android
2022	Prince of Persia Escape 2^{8}	Ubisoft, Ketchapp, Estoty	iOS, Android

Notes

1. New game with graphics and gameplay based in the original 1989 game, but with different levels.
2. Remake of the original 1989 game, with new graphics.
3. Port of the Mac OS version of the original game, with the original levels and graphics, designed as a universal title for iPhone, iPod Touch and iPad.
4. Port of the PS2 version of Warrior Within, with the same 3D graphics, with separate versions for iPhone and iPad.
5. New game which follows the plot of the original but with new 2D graphics and levels, since old feature phones couldn't handle 3D graphics.
6. Remake of the second game from 1993 with completely different graphics and levels.
7. Auto-runner based on the original 1989 game, with different levels and gameplay mechanics.
8. Sequel to Prince of Persia Escape. Expands on the formula by adding new environments, combat and mechanics.

== Graphic novel ==
Jordan Mechner finished writing the story for a graphic novel in 2007. The novel was written by A.B. Sina, and illustrated by Alex Puvilland and LeUyen Pham. It was released by First Second Books in autumn 2008. The story follows two Princes, jumping between the 9th and 13th centuries. Although it belongs to the franchise the plot is not related to any of the game continuities or that of the 2010 film.

Before the Sandstorm is a 2010 one-shot comic book that serves as both a direct prequel and sequel to the feature film and explains the motives and backgrounds of some characters. It was published by Disney press and written by Mechner with illustrations by Todd McFarlane, Niko Henrichon, David López and Bernard Chang.
