= Prince of Persia (disambiguation) =

Prince of Persia is a video game franchise.

Prince of Persia may also refer to:

- Prince of Persia (1989 video game)
- Prince of Persia (2008 video game)
- Prince of Persia: The Sands of Time (film), a 2010 film
- Prince (Prince of Persia), the protagonist of the video game franchise and the 2010 film
- Qamar al-Aqmar, also known as the "Prince of Persia", the protagonist of the One Thousand and One Nights tale of "The Ebony Horse"
- Prince of Persia, a territorial spirit described in the Book of Daniel
- The Prince of Persia, a nickname for the snooker player Hossein Vafaei

== See also ==
- List of monarchs of Persia
