= Prince of Persia 4 =

Prince of Persia 4 can refer to several different games in the Prince of Persia series, depending on how the count is done:

- Prince of Persia: The Sands of Time, counting the entire series
- Prince of Persia (2008 video game), counting only the Ubisoft games
- Prince of Persia: The Forgotten Sands, counting only the Sands of Time continuity
