= Princess Farah =

Princess Farah may refer to:

- Farah (born 2004), daughter of Reza Pahlavi, Crown Prince of Iran
- a fictional character in the 2003 video game Prince of Persia: The Sands of Time and its sequels
