= Prince of Persia Classic =

2007 video game

- Developer: Gameloft Montreal
- Publishers: Gameloft and Ubisoft
- Producers: Manuel Figeac; Ken Schachter
- Designers: Dominic Mercure; Samuel Bernier
- Artist: Arthur Hugot
- Composer: Mathieu Vachon
- Series: Prince of Persia
- Platforms: Xbox 360; PlayStation 3 iOS; Android
- Release: Xbox Live Arcade; June 13, 2007; PlayStation Network; October 23, 2008 iOS; December 20, 2011; Android; September 13, 2012
- Genres: Action, platform

Prince of Persia Classic is a 2007 action-platform game developed by Gameloft Montreal and published by Gameloft (Android, iOS) and Ubisoft (PlayStation 3, Xbox 360). It is a remake of the original Prince of Persia (1989) that utilizes the visual style introduced in 2003's Prince of Persia: The Sands of Time. Similarly to the original, players control an unnamed protagonist, the Prince referenced in the title, who must save the imprisoned Princess from the evil Grand Vizier Jaffar, who attempts to conquer the land while her father, the Sultan, is away. The game is generally considered to be non-canon to the Prince of Persia series.

Prince of Persia Classic was initially released in June 2007 for the Xbox 360 via Xbox Live Arcade, followed by versions for the PlayStation 3 via PlayStation Network, iOS and Android. It received generally positive reviews, with praise for its updated graphics, animations, and controls, and criticism for its short length and lack of replay value.

== Gameplay ==
The game plays similarly to the original 1989 version—the player has 60 minutes to make their way through a series of dungeons and defeat Jaffar before the Princess succumbs to a death spell put on her. The dungeons feature various death traps and enemies, and the player can make use of the Prince's parkour and swordfighting skills to overcome these threats. The remake features several new elements, such as the ability to roll, backflip, wall jump and stop time briefly during combat, as well as extra game modes.

== Reception ==
Reception

Aggregate score
Aggregator	Score
Metacritic	82/100 (X360); 75/100 (iOS); 73/100 (PS3)

Review scores
Publication	Score
Eurogamer	7/10
GameSpot	8.1/10
IGN	8.6/10
TouchArcade	3/5

On its release, Prince of Persia Classic was met with "generally favorable" reviews from critics for Xbox 360 and iOS, with the aggregate scores of 82/100 and 75/100, and "mixed or average reviews" with an aggregate score of 73/100 for PlayStation 3 on Metacritic. Reviews praised the updated graphics, smooth animations, classic platform gameplay, improved controls, and extra game modes, but criticized the short gameplay and a lack of replay value.
