= Prince of Persia 2: The Shadow and the Flame =

1993 video game

- MS-DOS box art
- Developer: Broderbund (Note: SNES version developed by Titus France SA.)
- Publisher: Broderbund: FM Towns, PC-98 Interprog Super NES Titus Software
- Designer: Jordan Mechner
- Composer: Jonelle Adkisson
- Series: Prince of Persia
- Platforms: MS-DOS, FM Towns, Mac OS, PC-98, Super NES
- Release: May 1993: MS-DOS; NA: May 1993 FM Towns; JP: July 1994 Mac OS; NA: 1994 PC-98; JP: January 8, 1995 Super NES; NA: October 1996; PAL: 1996
- Genre: Cinematic platform
- Mode: Single-player

Prince of Persia 2: The Shadow and the Flame is a 1993 cinematic platform game released by Broderbund for MS-DOS, and later ported to Macintosh, Super NES, and FM Towns. It is the sequel to 1989's Prince of Persia, and the second installment in the Prince of Persia series. Both games were designed by Jordan Mechner, but unlike the original, he did not program the sequel himself. In the game, players control the eponymous Prince as he attempts to return to medieval Persia and defeat the evil wizard Jaffar once and for all, who has assumed his appearance, seized the throne, and put his love interest, the Princess, under a death spell.

Similar to the original, Prince of Persia 2 was a commercial success, and was regarded by most contemporary reviewers as an improvement over its predecessor. The final installment in the original Prince of Persia trilogy, Prince of Persia 3D, was released in 1999. An updated version of the game for iOS and Android was released in 2013 without the "2" in the title.

== Gameplay ==
Similar to the first Prince of Persia, the character explores various deadly areas by running, jumping, crawling, avoiding traps, solving puzzles and drinking magic potions. Prince of Persia 2 is more combat-heavy than its predecessor. In the first game, enemies appear only occasionally and are always alone, while in the sequel, up to four enemies may appear at once, sometimes flanking the player, and may even be instantly replaced by reinforcements upon being killed. As in Prince of Persia, the goal is to complete the game under a strict time limit from 75 minutes (which start at a certain point in the game) that passes in real time. Lives are unlimited, but time cannot be regained (except by reverting to a previously saved game). In other areas, more significant improvements have been made. The graphics are far more complex than the simple look of the game's predecessor, the areas explored are larger, and the variety of backdrops is greater.

== Plot ==
The game takes place 11 days after the events of the first game. During this period, the Prince has been hailed as a hero who defeated the evil Jaffar. He turns down all riches and instead asks for the Princess's hand in marriage as his reward, to which the Sultan of Persia reluctantly agrees. The game begins as the Prince enters the royal courts of the palace. Before he enters, his appearance changes into that of a beggar. Nobody recognizes him, and when he attempts to speak with the Princess, a man who shares his appearance (Jaffar, who is magically disguised) emerges from the shadows, ordering him to be thrown out. With guards pursuing him, the Prince jumps through a window and flees the city by way of a ship.

Falling asleep on the ship, the Prince dreams of a mysterious woman who asks the Prince to come to her. At this time, the ship is struck by lightning, cast by Jaffar. When the Prince regains consciousness, he finds himself on the shore of a foreign island. He enters a cave full of reanimated human skeletons that attack him. After defeating their leader and losing his sword shortly after, he finally escapes on a magic carpet. In the meantime, in Persia, Jaffar seizes the throne in the guise of the Prince. The Princess falls ill under Jaffar's spell of gradual death.

The magic carpet takes the Prince to the ruins of Basra, filled with screaming flying goblin heads, snakes, and traps. He finds a dagger. Arriving at what appears to have once been a throne room, the Prince loses consciousness after touching a sword on the ground and has another vision. The mysterious woman, revealed to be his mother, appears again. She explains that the Prince is of a royal lineage, the only survivor of the massacre by "armies of darkness" after his parents sacrificed their own lives to save him, and that the sword belonged to his father. She implores him to take the sword and avenge the fallen.

The Prince rides a magical horse to a red temple, inhabited by warrior monks wearing bird headdresses. There, he finds that the shadow, created in the events of the original game, can now leave his body at his will. He wields his shadow to obtain the magic flame of the temple, at which point the bird warriors kneel before him. He flies back to Persia on the magic horse and confronts Jaffar. With the shadow and the flame, the Prince burns Jaffar, killing him for good.

With Jaffar's spell broken, the Princess awakens, and the couple rejoices in their love for each other. The Prince orders the scattering of Jaffar's ashes. The game ends on a cliffhanger when an old witch, with the same symbol drawn multiple times in the ruins tattooed on her forehead, is shown watching the happy couple through a crystal ball. According to Jordan Mechner, the plot involving the old witch and the "armies of darkness" was intended to be resolved in a sequel that never came.

== Ports ==
Titus Software ported the game to the Super NES and released it in 1996. It has some missing features and lacks several levels, including the last one. In August 2006, the Sega Genesis port was leaked. Ported by Microïds, this conversion was going to be published by Psygnosis, as depicted in the leaked version, but was canceled in an almost complete state for unknown reasons.

The game can also be unlocked in the Xbox NTSC version of Prince of Persia: The Sands of Time by finding a secret area. The GameCube, PlayStation 2 and Xbox PAL versions feature the original Prince of Persia instead and the Windows version lacks the secret area entirely. The Macintosh version has high resolution graphics (640×480), the MS-DOS and SNES version only low resolution graphics (320×200) and (256×224) respectively.

In July 2013, a remake of the game was made available for iOS and Android mobile devices which is developed by Ubisoft Pune. The game includes options for both virtual buttons and gesture-based controls. It is currently available on the Samsung Galaxy app store but has been removed from Google Play Store without any clarification from Google.

== Reception ==
Reception

Review scores
Publication	Score
AllGame	3/5 (MAC)
Power Unlimited	70% (PC)

According to Jordan Mechner, Prince of Persia 2 was a commercial success, with sales of 750,000 units by 2000.

Charles Ardai wrote in Computer Gaming World that "Prince of Persia 2 not only is in every dimension better than Prince of Persia, but ... is the cruelest, most infuriating, least merciful—in short, the best—game of its type I have ever played", with "an appeal that is absolutely irresistible". He criticized the imperfect savegame feature that forced him to replay areas dozens of times, and other aspects of gameplay, but concluded that the game "merits nothing but salaam after salaam ... a virtuoso performance by Mechner, one of the field's most devious puzzle constructors". Power Play gave both the DOS and Macintosh versions a 68% score. Computer and Video Games gave the PC version a 92% score.

Prince of Persia 2 won Computer Gaming World's "Action Game of the Year" award in June 1994. The editors wrote that it "certainly surpasses its predecessor", and called it a "smoothly animated horizontal scrolling thriller with cinematic scope, vivid action and daunting puzzles".

Coach Kyle of GamePro gave the Super NES version a mixed review. He criticized the black outlines on the characters and the weak sound effects, but praised the eerie music and the quality of the challenge, deeming it "a tough thinking-gamer's game". Power Unlimited gave the PC version a score of 70% writing: "The sequel to the classic Prince of Persia has just as smooth animations and beautiful sounds, but eventually falls short because the levels are less well designed than in the original and the puzzles have become too difficult."
