= Elika (Prince of Persia) =

Fictional character from Prince of Persia

- Prince of Persia character
- First game: Prince of Persia
- Voiced by: Kari Wahlgren (2008)

Elika is a fictional character in Ubisoft's video games series, Prince of Persia. Voiced by Kari Wahlgren, she debuts in the 2008 reboot of the franchise, Prince of Persia. During gameplay, Elika provides the protagonist Prince character with support in combat and acrobatics using magic. In the story, she alone possesses the ability to repair specially designated spots of land called fertile grounds, cleansing them from the antagonist Ahriman's Corruption and cutting him off from the source of power. Elika was well-received by critics, many of which lauded her functionality in both gameplay and as a story element.

== Character design ==
An artificially intelligent (AI) companion character was one of Ubisoft's first ideas when developing Prince of Persia. When conceiving the idea of Elika, the development team was originally exploring the idea of a father figure or a brother. Ultimately, though, Ubisoft decided that the angle of a potential love interest between the protagonist and the AI companion would work better. When that choice was made, Ubisoft then set a goal to confuse players about their emotions when separated from Elika. They wanted players to feel a sense of loss, but they wanted confusion over whether it was a sense of loss over Elika's powers, or her as a character. Ubisoft tried to do this by consistently reminding the player of Elika's role. They also wanted Elika to always be a positive companion to the player; they never wanted to player to resent Elika's presence or her aid, because her role is integral to Prince of Persia.

Ben Mattes, the producer for the Prince of Persia, said:

Elika was designed so that, regardless of your culture or nationality or whatever, everybody on the planet will look at her and say: "She’s pretty"... There’s this fine line where she has to be strong yet sexy; autonomous but have a certain amount of dependency on the Prince so that the player still feels like a hero. It was also really important to us that she not be treated like a sex symbol or a romantic interest. She has her own ideals and her own goals.

Concept art for Elika's original character design depicted her as having long and glowing white hair, making her "seductive, magical but still strong and independent". According to Ben Mattes, the design tested poorly both internally at Ubisoft and at focus groups because she was found to be "too ethereal and thus unapproachable for a human", making it impossible for Elika and the Prince to fall in love. The team considered this feedback and came up with Elika's final design. In the final version of the game, Elika is also perpetually barefoot, though she did wear sandals in an earlier design.

Voice actor Kari Wahlgren called her work as voicing Elika "one of the most challenging roles I've ever done."

== Appearances ==
=== Prince of Persia ===
In the 2008 video game Prince of Persia, Elika appears as an AI-controlled protagonist and companion to the player. Before the events of the game began, Elika died. Ahriman, the primary antagonist and god of darkness, then offered to resurrect Elika in return for his own liberation, and Elika's father accepted the offer. Elika, against her own wishes, was then resurrected, but fled from her father, intending to re-imprison Ahriman. While fleeing, she encounters the Prince character, who decides to accompany and aid her. With his help, she fends off her father and his men, and arrive at the location where Ahriman was imprisoned. Then her father arrives and breaks the seal holding Ahriman, releasing him. Elika flees with the Prince character, and devises a plan to re-imprison the dark god. She plans to systematically travel to and heal specially designated areas of land called fertile grounds, which Ahriman is using to gain more power. With the aid of the Prince, she succeeds at this, but gets weaker with each healing. When she finally heals the rest of the land, she gives her life force to repair the prison Ahriman was kept in, and dies. She is soon resurrected by the Prince, however, and once again tasked with imprisoning Ahriman.

== Reception ==
Elika was widely received better than the protagonist Prince character. 1UP proposed that Elika replaced the functionality of time-manipulation from previous iterations of the series. 1UP also said that Elika "makes up for the Prince's shortcomings as opposed to enhancing them". Eurogamer called Elika "serious and likeable". Game Revolution proposed that Elika's name deserves to be in the title of the game. GameSpot said that "as the game progresses, you'll become much more invested in her past than the prince's." GameSpot also said that Elika exudes most of the charm from the two protagonists of Prince of Persia, that she enriches the mechanics in the game, and that she's an essential piece of the gameplay mechanics. A review by Hardcore Gaming 101 praised Elika as "an interesting character in the story, with lots of fun banter between her and the Prince", but criticized her gameplay mechanics, stating that she "has no meaningful place in the gameplay". IGN praised Elika saying, "If Elika were just a little bit more real or I was just a tad more insane, I'd marry her." IGN proposes that Elika is an essential asset and that she's "far more likeable than the boorish Prince." IGN called Elika a success saying that she is "so significant to the story and gameplay that I found myself caring far more for her safety than that of my own character." Fox News described her as "an unusually appealing sidekick." Game Informer said that Elika "defies the expectation of bad AI-driven partners, and instead feels like a natural extension of the player’s will in the game world," and that the optional in-game dialogue articulates Elika's affection for the Prince. The Star described her as an appealing aspect of the game, calling her both delightful and describing the dialogue between herself and the Prince as "quite amusing". The Globe and Mail praised her as "smart as sassy", a contrast to The Prince who they felt was "smarmy but likable". Entertainment Weekly describer her as "part Arabian Nights beauty, part Tomb Raider heroine", though stated her role in the game hampered her impact. Elika was ranked number four on IGN's Reader's Pick: Game Gal of 2008, receiving 12% of the votes from readers of the site's FAQ section. Virgin Media placed Elika on the list of "Top 10 game babes vying for Lara's title", and suggested that her visual design was inspired by Natalie Portman. The Italian version of Tom's Hardware placed Elika on the list of "Top 10 most sexy video game female characters". In 2013, The Koalition included her into a list of "top 5 NPC companions in video games". Kyle Hilliard compared Prince and Elika's relationship to that of Joel and Ellie's from The Last of Us, writing that both duos care deeply for one another, and praising the "emotional crescendo" in The Last of Us, which he judged had not been achieved in Prince of Persia. Hilary Goldstein, writing for the IGN, described Elika as "the emotional connection of the story" and noted that while she is "technically an AI character, in reality she is an extension of the Prince".

Unwinnable noted that Elika's early character design, in which she has white hair, and is dressed in white and red, is a reference to Eredat-fedhri ("Victorious Helper"), a virgin maiden from Zoroastrian mythology who is the equivalent of Virgin Mary. Daniel Galera stated that the Prince's "evasive stance contrasts with Elika’s sincerity and idealism".

== See also ==
- List of fictional princesses
- List of barefooters
