= Battles of Prince of Persia =

2005 video game

- North American box art
- Developer: Ubisoft Montreal
- Publisher: Ubisoft
- Producer: Geneviève Lord
- Designer: Stéphane Brochu
- Programmer: Sébastien Lahaie
- Composer: Stuart Chatwood
- Series: Prince of Persia
- Platform: Nintendo DS
- Release: NA: December 6, 2005; AU: December 8, 2005; EU: December 9, 2005
- Genre: Turn-based tactics
- Modes: Single-player, Multiplayer

Battles of Prince of Persia is a 2005 turn-based tactics video game developed by Ubisoft Montreal and published by Ubisoft for the Nintendo DS. It is a spin-off of the Prince of Persia series, and sees players assuming the role of multiple characters from the games' universe, including the titular Prince. The story of the game bridges the gap between the mainline installments The Sands of Time (2003) and Warrior Within (2004).

== Gameplay ==
Battles of Prince of Persia is a turn-based tactics game combined with collectible card game elements. The game involves a variety of playing cards which are characterized by a picture and a number, providing the card with its two uses. The first use is to play the magical effect on the card, the second use is to play the number on the card, which determines how many orders the player may give within the hour. Each battle is divided up into hours, which are then divided into turns. Each turn, a player either uses a card for effect or orders, or passes. An hour ends when both players are unable or unwilling to use any more cards and both pass.

The game includes tactical elements such as zone of control and directional facing, where attacking an enemy from behind will produce better results than from the front. Zone of Control prevents players from moving their units right through an enemy's lines and directly to the goal or leader.

== Plot ==
The game is set in Persia, India, and the fictional nation of Aresura. Each of these kingdoms sends three generals to fight their wars. Caught in the middle of these conflicts is the Prince, who finds out that he is being hunted by the Dahaka, an incarnation of fate, because he interfered with time and cheated his own death in the process. (Note: As depicted in Prince of Persia: The Sands of Time.) While searching for a way to stop the Dahaka, the Prince accidentally starts a war between Persia and India. Over the course of the game, the Prince fights the Deavas, a mythical race of demons contained within a box he opens, and Kalim, the Prince of India and brother of his long-lost love Farah. As a result of the wars, the Prince matures and becomes more cynical and violent, matching his characterization in Prince of Persia: Warrior Within.

== Reception ==
Reception

Aggregate scores
Aggregator	Score
GameRankings	65.16%
Metacritic	64/100

Review scores
Publication	Score
Edge	5/10
Eurogamer	4/10
Game Informer	8.5/10
GameSpy	3.5/5
IGN	5.5/10
NGC Magazine	69%
Nintendo Power	6.5/10
Nintendo World Report	5.5/10
PALGN	7/10
VideoGamer.com	4/10

Battles of Prince of Persia received mixed reviews; GameRankings gave it a score of 65.16%, while Metacritic gave it 64 out of 100.
