= The Rogue Prince of Persia =

2025 video game

- Developer: Evil Empire
- Publisher: Ubisoft
- Director: Lucie Dewagnier
- Producer: Jolan Reynaud
- Artist: Dylan Eurlings
- Writer: Matthew Willis
- Composer: Daniel Asadi
- Series: Prince of Persia
- Platforms: PlayStation 5; Windows; Xbox Series X/S; Nintendo Switch; Nintendo Switch 2
- Release: PS5, Windows, Xbox Series X/S; August 20, 2025; Nintendo Switch, Switch 2; December 16, 2025
- Genres: Roguelike, platform
- Mode: Single-player

The Rogue Prince of Persia is a 2025 roguelite platform game developed by Evil Empire and published by Ubisoft. Part of the Prince of Persia series, the game follows an unnamed Prince carrying a magic bola as he rushes to save his homeland from an army of Huns. The game was released through early access in May 2024, and released in full for PlayStation 5, Windows and Xbox Series X/S on August 20, 2025. It was released on Nintendo Switch and Nintendo Switch 2 on December 16, 2025.

== Gameplay ==
The Rogue Prince of Persia is a 2D side-scrolling game focused on a character known as the Prince. The Prince has access to a number of parkour moves, such as wall jumping, wall running, swinging and jumping off poles, and more. Combat involves melee and ranged attacks, kicks that send enemies backwards, and dodging by vaulting over enemies. The prince is armed with a primary and a secondary weapon, and his loadout can be changed freely. As players progress, they will collect medallions which can be further used to augment the Prince's weapons. Levels in the game are procedurally generated.

The game features roguelike elements. The Prince has a mysterious artifact that allows him to travel back in time when dying, enabling him to avoid permanent death and return to a hub area named "The Oasis" where he can restock potions and upgrade his skills and weapons. Enemies will drop coins, which can be used to collect new weapons and restore health items during combat, and chests containing new weapons can be found during gameplay. The game features a "Memory Board" which tracks the Prince's interactions with the supporting characters, some of whom will provide additional information on a level's layout and secrets.

== Plot ==
The game takes place in and around the city of Ctesiphon. After the Prince provokes the Hun army, their chief, Nogaï, sends an army of possessed soldiers to destroy the city, which the Prince is tasked with preventing.

== Development ==
The Rogue Prince of Persia was developed by Bordeaux-based Evil Empire, the co-developer of Dead Cells' downloadable content packs. The studio pitched the project to license owner Ubisoft during the alpha stage of the development of Prince of Persia: The Lost Crown. While the game had no connection to other Prince of Persia games, the team identified the key gameplay pillars of past games (namely fast traversal, acrobatic combat and trap-filled environments), and sought to recreate them in a roguelike game. The team was also in close contact with the developers of The Lost Crown to ensure that the two games were distinct from each other. The team briefly experimented with a mechanic that allowed players to briefly unwind time to undo smaller mistakes in combat or transversal, similar to Prince of Persia: The Sands of Time trilogy, though this feature was scrapped because the team felt that it broke the rhythm of combat. The combat was designed to be challenging but accessible for players who are new to the gameplay format.

== Release ==
The game was announced during the Triple-i Initiative showcase in April 2024. While set to be released through Steam's early access program on May 14, 2024, the surprise release of Supergiant Games' Hades II on May 6 led Evil Empire to push back the release of The Rogue to later in the month. The early access version included only one of the three acts planned for the final game. The second act was added as a part of The Second Act update in November 2024. The game was released in full on August 20, 2025. It was released on Nintendo Switch and Nintendo Switch 2 on December 16, 2025.

== Reception ==
Reception

Aggregate score
Aggregator	Score
Metacritic	(PC) 80/100 (PS5) 81/100

Review scores
Publication	Score
GamesRadar+	3.5/5 stars
PC Gamer (US)	79/100

The game received "generally favorable" reviews according to Metacritic.

Writing for PC Gamer, Jody Macgregor described the game as a "roguelite mash-up of Dead Cells and Hades", and praised the game's combat and movement systems, adding that "smooth action blends seamlessly into smooth traversal, making this the better modern 2D Prince of Persia". Joel Franey from GamesRadar also praised its gameplay and its ligne claire art style, though he found that the game did not innovate enough, concluding that the game may be "a bit too conventional for its own good, lacking any real unique qualities in a crowded market", and noting that it had "no ambition to outreach or even simply match" its competitors.
