= Prince of Persia: The Fallen King =

2008 video game

- Developer: Ubisoft Casablanca
- Publisher: Ubisoft
- Producer: David Blanchard
- Designer: Abdelwahed Benyahya
- Programmer: Idir Boumahdi
- Artist: Sanaa Mejjadi
- Composers: Inon Zur; Stuart Chatwood
- Series: Prince of Persia
- Platform: Nintendo DS
- Release: NA: December 2, 2008; EU: December 5, 2008
- Genres: Platform, action-adventure
- Mode: Single-player

Prince of Persia: The Fallen King is a 2008 platform game developed and published by Ubisoft. It was released for the Nintendo DS in December 2008, as a spin-off of Prince of Persia. The game's plot, taking place in ancient Persia, concerns the player character's role in a celestial battle between two gods: Ahriman and Ormazd. The player assumes the role of the Prince and Zal, fighting Ahriman's forces using a variety of physical and magical attacks. Prince of Persia: The Fallen King received mixed reviews, with the most agreed-upon problem being the control scheme.

== Gameplay ==
Gameplay screenshot showing Zal using his magic.

The main objective of the game is to collect four pieces to a magical seal which will banish the evil god Ahriman from the region. The Nintendo DS stylus is used to maneuver the Prince by touching the touchscreen. The stylus is used to move the Prince, to do acrobatic moves, in combat, and to use Zal's magic. As the Prince and Zal progress in their adventure, Zal becomes Corrupted at certain points, in which the Prince has to pursue and defeat him. Sometimes, after being defeated, Zal gains new powers. These powers allow him and the Prince to perform gradually more advanced platforming maneuvers.

Platforming is done by using the Nintendo DS stylus, and tapping the touchscreen in the direction the player wants the Prince to move. For example, if the player wants to run up a wall, and jump back onto a rope, the player must first tap up the wall, then tap the rope. Sometimes, platforming implements combat as well. Combat is also done using the Nintendo DS stylus. There are three combat options; a sword strike, with the Prince swinging his sword to damage enemies; a block move, where the Prince defends himself against enemies; and a magic power triggered by Zal that does no damage, but causes the enemy to recoil, pushing them back should the duo be overwhelmed.

== Plot synopsis ==
=== Setting and characters ===
Prince of Persia: The Fallen King is set in ancient Persia, in a fictional city-state called the City of the New Dawn, where Zoroastrianism is the dominant religion. In the City of the New Dawn, the recently liberated primary antagonist of the game, the god Ahriman, runs rampant and begins infecting the land. The game primarily focuses on the Prince character, and his companion, Zal, as the duo attempt to locate the king of the land, who they suspect can help stop Ahriman.

=== Story ===
Following the events of Prince of Persia and Prince of Persia Epilogue, the story begins with the split of the Prince and Elika. While Elika stays with the Ahura, leading the resistance against Ahriman, the Prince departs in search of the king of the City of New Dawn, in the hope that he can summon Ormazd, due to his affinity for the remnants of Ormazd's power. Here, the Prince finds a new ally, Zal, who introduces himself as one of the king's Magi and teams up with the Prince to save the City of New Dawn from corruption and ultimately stop Ahriman.

Later on, Zal reveals that the king was split in two by the Corruption; one half is his true self, while the other is a corrupted beast. The Ancestor, a character who occasionally helped the Prince and Zal, guides them to find a special power to save the city. This power then fuses the Prince and Zal into one being that preserves both Zal's powers and the Prince's acrobatics. Together they face and defeat the king's monstrous half. The defeat of the beast frees Zal from the Corruption, but also causes him to perish. The Prince then frees the land from the Corruption by reaching the city's seal. In the end, the Ancestor leaves a message of hope for the Prince, promising that, in time, an inner power would be revealed and a new ally would be found.

== Reception ==
Reception

Aggregate scores
Aggregator	Score
GameRankings	64.63%
Metacritic	64/100

Review scores
Publication	Score
1Up.com	C
Game Informer	6/10
GameSpot	6/10
GameZone	6.5/10
IGN	6.8/10
Nintendo Power	7/10
Official Nintendo Magazine	80%
PALGN	6.5/10
VideoGamer.com	6/10

Prince of Persia: The Fallen King was met with modest reviews by critics, earning a score of 64.63% on GameRankings and 64 out of 100 on Metacritic. The main gripe among reviewers seemed to be the control scheme. IGN reviewer Matt Casamassina called the control scheme "ultimately passable, even allowing for some fun moments... [but] not superior to traditional controls". Casamassina found it less responsive and reliable on most occasions. 1UP.com reviewer Anthony Gallegos also criticized the control scheme, and lack of control options saying the controls were "more immediately intuitive... [but not] necessary". Gallegos elaborated further, stating that he would have appreciated the option for a D-pad controlled game.

Another criticism was the length of the game, with some reviewers citing that it was too lengthy. 1UP.com reviewer Gallegos said he enjoyed the game initially, but it quickly got old and began to "[feel] artificially long, as though a few good ideas were tossed into a random level-generator and then slapped together until a game of desirable length formed". He further admitted that "if the team behind The Fallen King had just made it a lot shorter and perhaps added some additional challenges, like time trials, it might have helped with the diminishing returns I felt from each successive level".

An aspect that was liked, however, by GameSpot reviewer Carolyn Petit, was the Prince character. She proposed that he was "a good deal more likable than ... in the console game". She also said that despite Prince having constant wisecracks, he's fighting for something he cares about deeply. IGN reviewer Casamassina, in contrast, criticized the way the Prince was portrayed, saying that "the DS Prince ... just doesn't exude much visual charm", and that, "in contrast ... he's the worst looking iteration of the character since the franchise's reboot a generation ago".
