= Prince of Persia: The Sands of Time (film) =

2010 film by Mike Newell

- American theatrical release poster
- Directed by: Mike Newell
- Screenplay by: Boaz Yakin; Doug Miro; Carlo Bernard
- Story by: Jordan Mechner
- Based on: Prince of Persia by Jordan Mechner
- Produced by: Jerry Bruckheimer
- Starring: Jake Gyllenhaal; Ben Kingsley; Gemma Arterton; Alfred Molina
- Cinematography: John Seale
- Edited by: Michael Kahn; Martin Walsh; Mick Audsley
- Music by: Harry Gregson-Williams
- Production companies: Walt Disney Pictures; Jerry Bruckheimer Films
- Distributed by: Walt Disney Studios; Motion Pictures
- Release dates: May 9, 2010 (London); May 21, 2010 (United Kingdom); May 28, 2010 (United States)
- Running time: 116 minutes
- Countries: United States; United Kingdom
- Language: English
- Budget: $150–200 million
- Box office: $336.4 million

Prince of Persia: The Sands of Time is a 2010 action fantasy film based on the video game series Prince of Persia created by Jordan Mechner. It was directed by Mike Newell from a screenplay by Boaz Yakin, Doug Miro, and Carlo Bernard, based on a story by Mechner. The film stars Jake Gyllenhaal, Ben Kingsley, Gemma Arterton, and Alfred Molina. It is an adaptation of the 2003 video game of the same name published by Ubisoft. Elements from its sequels Warrior Within (2004) and The Two Thrones (2005) are also incorporated.

Prince of Persia: The Sands of Time premiered in London on May 9, 2010, and was released theatrically in the United Kingdom on May 21 and the United States on May 28 by Walt Disney Studios Motion Pictures. The film received mixed reviews from critics and had grossed over $336.4 million on a production budget of $150–200 million, and was the highest-grossing video game film adaptation until it was surpassed by Warcraft in 2016.

== Plot ==
Dastan, a street urchin in Persia, is adopted by King Sharaman after showing courage. Fifteen years later at the Persian borderlands outside the Holy City of Alamut, the king's brother Nizam relays evidence to the princes—Dastan, along with the king's biological sons Tus and Garsiv—that weapons have been forged by Persia's enemies. Tus directs the Persian army to capture Alamut. During the attack, Dastan defeats a royal guard and obtains a sacred dagger from him.

Alamut falls to the Persians, but Tamina, the Princess of Alamut, denies that the city has any weapon forges. Tus asks her to marry him to unite the two nations, and she only accepts after seeing the dagger in Dastan's possession. At their celebratory banquet, Tus has Dastan give their father an embroidered robe. However, the robe is poisoned, fatally burning Sharaman. Garsiv accuses Dastan of the king's murder. Dastan escapes with Tamina, and Tus is appointed king and a bounty on Dastan's head is set.

While in hiding, Tamina attempts to kill Dastan and steal the dagger, and in the struggle, Dastan discovers the dagger enables the wielder to travel back in time. Believing Tus invaded Alamut for the dagger, Dastan decides to confront his brother. On the way, the two are captured by merchant-bandits led by Sheik Amar who seeks the reward money, but they manage to escape. After arriving in Avrat, Dastan tries to convince Nizam of his innocence. Seeing burns on Nizam's hands, Dastan realizes that Nizam orchestrated the king's murder. Dastan is forced to escape once again. Nizam sends a group of covert warriors, the Hassansins, to kill Dastan and find the dagger.

Tamina later tells Dastan that long ago, the gods unleashed a great sandstorm to destroy humanity but were moved by a young girl's offer to sacrifice herself in humanity's place and trapped the Sands of Time in a large sandglass. Tamina is the latest guardian of the dagger, given to the young girl by the gods, which can pierce the sandglass and potentially destroy the world. Nizam intends to travel back to his childhood, prevent himself from saving Sharaman from a lion attack and become King of Persia in his place. Amar captures the two again, but Dastan saves Amar's men from a Hassansin attack using the dagger. This convinces Amar to escort them to a sanctuary near the Hindu Kush, where Tamina will seal the dagger within the stone it first came from. At the sanctuary, Garsiv appears, whom Dastan convinces of his innocence. However, the Hassansins ambush them, killing Garsiv and stealing the dagger.

Dastan's group travels back to Alamut to steal back the dagger and warn Tus of Nizam. Amar's right-hand man, Seso, dies retrieving the dagger for Dastan, who demonstrates its powers to Tus and convinces him of the truth. Nizam interrupts them, kills Tus, and takes the dagger back. Tamina saves Dastan from being killed, and the two head for the secret tunnels beneath the city that lead to the sandglass. They reach Nizam, who stabs Dastan and throws them off a cliff. Tamina sacrifices herself, releasing Dastan's hand and falling to her death. This allows him to fight Nizam.

Nizam thrusts the dagger into the column of sandglass under the temple. Dastan grabs hold of the hilt of the dagger together with Nizam; as sand is released from the sandglass, time rewinds to the moment Dastan finds the dagger. He finds Tus and Garsiv and exposes Nizam's treachery. Nizam tries to kill Dastan, who easily defeats him. Nizam gets up and attempts to attack again but is subdued and killed by Tus. Tus apologizes to Tamina for the siege and proposes to strengthen the two nations' bond by marital alliance of the princess to Dastan. Dastan returns the dagger to Tamina as an engagement gift and tells her he looks forward to their future together.

== Cast ==
- Jake Gyllenhaal as Prince Dastan of Persia
  - Will Foster as Young Dastan
- Ben Kingsley as Prince Nizam of Persia, King Sharaman's brother
- Gemma Arterton as Princess Tamina of Alamut
- Alfred Molina as Sheik Amar
- Richard Coyle as Prince Tus of Persia
- Toby Kebbell as Prince Garsiv of Persia
- Steve Toussaint as Seso
- Ronald Pickup as King Sharaman, the King of Persia and father to Dastan, Tus, and Garsiv.
- Gísli Örn Garðarsson as Hassansin Leader
- Reece Ritchie as Bis, Dastan's friend
- Darwin Shaw as Asoka

== Production ==
=== Development ===
In March 2004, the production company Jerry Bruckheimer Films sought to acquire feature film rights to the 2003 video game Prince of Persia: The Sands of Time with the film to be distributed by Walt Disney Pictures. Under John August as executive producer, the series' creator Jordan Mechner was hired to write the script. Producer Jerry Bruckheimer's Pirates of the Caribbean film trilogy served as a touchstone in how a theme park ride was converted into a film franchise. According to Mechner, rather than to do a straight adaptation of the video game, they took some elements from the game and used them to craft a new story. Mechner previously considered producing an animated film based on the games, but could not resist Disney and Bruckheimer's offer. In February 2006, Disney hired screenwriter Jeffrey Nachmanoff to write a new script for Prince of Persia.

Early in 2007, Disney announced Prince of Persia as one of its tentpole films and by June had scheduled a release date for July 10, 2009, before having a final script or any actors attached. By November, Disney entered negotiations with Mike Newell to direct the film based on a script by Mechner and Nachmanoff, though the studio held off production until the 2007–2008 Writers Guild of America strike was resolved. Newell was fond of Bruckheimer's films, and loved the "exciting and immensely romantic" script, which reminded him of Lost Horizon. His assistant played the video games and gave the director key details. Mechner, in writing the script, re-conceived the storyline to shift the perspective from the interactive one experienced by video gamers to the non-interactive experience by film audiences. The screenwriter left out elements of the Prince of Persia video games Warrior Within and The Two Thrones and did not anticipate including these elements in the film's possible sequels.

When filming began, the film's release date was postponed to May 28, 2010, with the studio seeking enough time for the post-production process in designing the film's special effects. The profit margin on the Pirates of the Caribbean films was compromised by overspending as special effects teams rushed to complete the films for their release dates. Variety also ascribed the postponement to avoiding the potential 2008 Screen Actors Guild strike so the studio could ensure that the film leads to a "mega-franchise" similar to its successful Pirates of the Caribbean series. Other reasons for the release date change were that the film was originally scheduled a week before Transformers: Revenge of the Fallen, and Disney needed more time to co-ordinate its marketing campaign. Gyllenhaal claims he "over-prepared" for the role, gaining five or six pounds of muscle. Gemma Arterton was cast to play the role of protagonist Tamina, and practiced horse back riding in Madrid before filming. Ben Kingsley was cast to portray the film's antagonist, Nizam. Alfred Molina was cast to portray a character named Sheik Amar, who becomes a mentor to the prince. Toby Kebbell was cast to play Prince Garsiv, Dastan's brother and head of the Persian army.

=== Filming ===
In March 2008, director Newell selected Morocco as a shooting location for Prince of Persia and also planned to film in Pinewood Studios. Production was scheduled to begin in mid-June 2008. By May, actors Jake Gyllenhaal and Gemma Arterton were cast into the lead roles. With a new script by Jordan Mechner, Doug Miro, Carlo Bernard, and Boaz Yakin, filming began in July in Morocco as well as London. Eight weeks were spent in Morocco before the first unit moved to Pinewood. Unlike other Disney films being made at the time, filming was not done in three dimensions, nor was the film converted into 3-D during post production. Jake Gyllenhaal employed a Received Pronunciation-style accent for his role, reflecting the broader convention of using British accents in historical and fantasy settings. Gyllenhaal later stated that maintaining the accent during production had been challenging.

=== Soundtrack ===
Alanis Morissette composed the theme song for the film, named "I Remain". The score was written by composer Harry Gregson-Williams and was released through Walt Disney Records on May 25, 2010.

== Release ==
Disney's marketing strategy included a step by step release of the film. Prince of Persia was released first in Europe, with its world premiere held in Westfield, London, UK on May 9, 2010, then premiered on May 19 in Italy, France, Belgium, the Netherlands, Norway, Denmark, Sweden and Finland, and on May 20 in Germany. It was released on May 21 in the United Kingdom, Spain, Bulgaria, Poland, and Turkey. It was released in Australia, Hong Kong, Malaysia, and the Philippines on May 27. The film was not released in the United States until May 28 to try to profit from the potentially higher audience on Memorial Day weekend. It was also released in Ghana, India, Romania and Nigeria on May 28.

=== Marketing ===
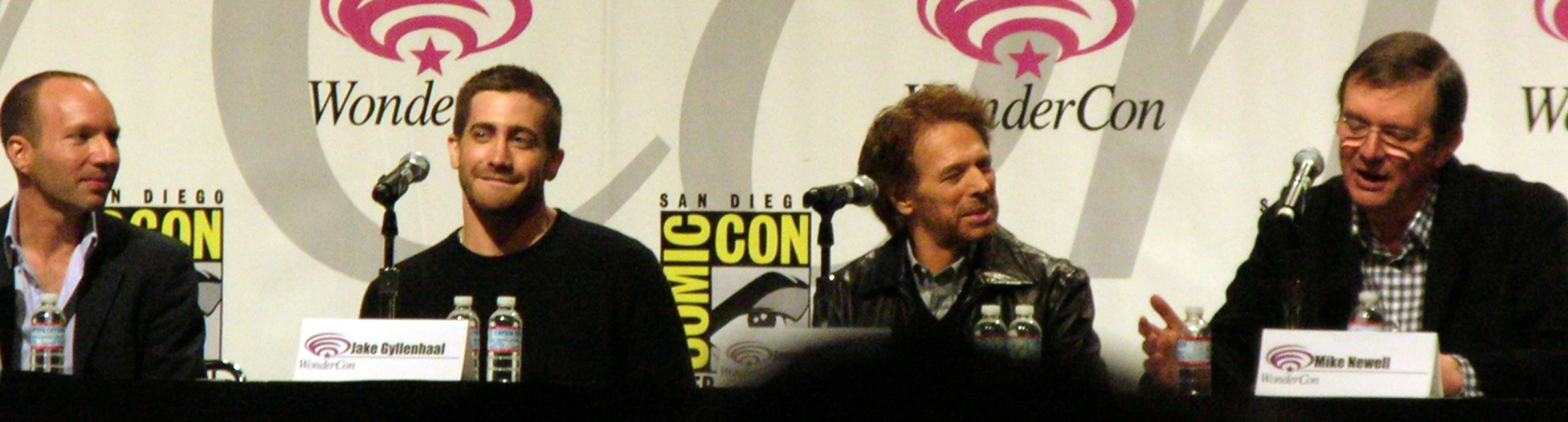
Mechner, Gyllenhaal, Bruckheimer, and Newell at a panel promoting the film at WonderCon 2010

The poster made its debut as a background prop in a 2009 Bruckheimer production, Confessions of a Shopaholic, similar to how Warner Bros. incorporated posters for various developed but never filmed projects based on their comic characters in I Am Legend. The week of Confessions of a Shopaholic's release, Disney signed a merchandising deal with Lego for the film.

Disney released merchandise such as action figures, Lego sets, costumes and a replica Dagger of Time. It also released a graphic novel called Prince of Persia: Before the Sandstorm, which acts as a prequel to the film. Also, a video game was developed by Ubisoft Montreal titled Prince of Persia: The Forgotten Sands and was released alongside the film, but the game's story is unrelated to the film, and instead takes place between the first two games in the Sands of Time trilogy.

=== Home media ===
Walt Disney Studios Home Entertainment released a single-disc DVD, a single-disc Blu-ray Disc, and a 3-disc Blu-ray combo-pack in the United States on September 14, 2010. The DVD landed in the number one spot on the US DVD sales chart, with 664,041 units sold within the first week and 1,623,361 units in total (equal to $33,941,976) as of March 2011.

In the United Kingdom, it opened at number one on the DVD and Blu-ray charts during its first week. In Germany, too, the DVD landed No. 1 on the country's DVD chart.

== Reception ==
=== Box office ===
The film, which—according to Disney and Bruckheimer—was supposed to be "the new Pirates of the Caribbean", debuted #3 at the U.S. box office behind Shrek Forever After and Sex and the City 2 with $30.1 million in its first 3-day weekend of release. It is the third highest opening for a video game adaptation, behind Lara Croft: Tomb Raider and Pokémon: The First Movie. During Memorial Day, it surpassed Sex and the City 2 to gross $37,813,075 for the 4-day weekend and finish in second place.

Internationally, the film grossed an estimated $18 million in its first weekend (before its US release), when it opened in 19 European countries. It debuted at #1 in these countries, except the United Kingdom where it lost the top spot to StreetDance 3D. A week later the film was released in the rest of the world and it grossed an estimated $61.6 million in total from 47 countries and $30.1 million in North America, becoming the leader of the worldwide box office with $91,695,259, while reaching the #1 spot in 41 of the 47 countries. The film has ultimately earned $90,759,676 in the United States and Canada and $244,394,967 in other countries, for a total worldwide gross of $335,154,643. The film overtook the previous record holder Lara Croft: Tomb Raider as the highest-grossing video game adaptation of all time, before it was surpassed by Warcraft in 2016. Though decent box office returns, plans for a Prince of Persia film franchise were cancelled following mediocre reviews and declining interest in the games.

=== Critical response ===
On review aggregation website Rotten Tomatoes the film holds a 36% rating based on 231 reviews, with an average score of 5.1/10. The critical consensus is: "It doesn't offer much in the way of substance, but Prince of Persia is a suitably entertaining swashbuckler—and a substantial improvement over most video game adaptations". Metacritic, which calculates an average rating based on reviews from mainstream critics, gave a score of 50 out of 100, based on 38 reviews, indicating "mixed or average reviews". Audiences polled by CinemaScore gave the film an average grade of "B" on an A+ to F scale.

The Chicago Sun-Times critic Roger Ebert gave the film two stars out of four and was critical of Gyllenhaal's and Arterton's performances. David Roark of Relevant gave the film a positive review and wrote that "Newell has unquestionably accomplished what he set out to do, which is ridiculous, silly and forgettable, but amusing nonetheless". In a 2019 interview with Yahoo! Entertainment, Gyllenhaal expressed regret about the film: "I think I learned a lot from that movie in that I spend a lot of time trying to be very thoughtful about the roles that I pick and why I'm picking them. And you're bound to slip up and be like, 'That wasn't right for me,' or 'That didn't fit perfectly.' There have been a number of roles like that. And then a number of roles that do."

== Canceled sequels ==
The film was intended to be the start of a new franchise, similar to the Pirates of the Caribbean films, as a swashbuckling adventure series. Though the box office returns were decent, the mediocre reviews and dissipating interest in the games led to any sequel plans being abandoned.

== See also ==
- Sassanian Empire
- List of films based on video games
- Time travel
- Persian empire
