= Prince (Prince of Persia) =

Fictional characters in the Prince of Persia franchise

The Prince
- Prince of Persia character
- The Prince as he appears in The Forgotten Sands (2010)
- First game: Prince of Persia (1989)
- Created by: Jordan Mechner
- Designed by: Jordan Mechner; Raphael Lacoste (Sands of Time); Mikael Labat, Nicolas Bouvier (Warrior Within)
- Portrayed by: Jake Gyllenhaal (film adaptation); William Foster (young)
- Voiced by: Various: English; Dave Boat (Prince of Persia 3D); Yuri Lowenthal (Sands of Time, The Two Thrones, The Forgotten Sands); Robin Atkin Downes (Warrior Within); Nolan North (Prince of Persia 2008); Adam El Hagar (The Lost Crown)

The Prince is the name given to a group of fictional characters who act as the main protagonists of the Prince of Persia franchise, originally created by Jordan Mechner and currently owned by Ubisoft. Beginning with the original game in 1989, there have been several distinct Prince characters, all sharing general traits. The most prominent version was introduced in Prince of Persia: The Sands of Time (2003) and featured in several other games set within the same continuity. In the 2008 reboot, the Prince is not from a royal family, but was planned to earn his title during the course of his journey. Other versions of the Prince have appeared in related media, most prominently the character Dastan (Persian: دستان) in the 2010 Prince of Persia film, portrayed by Jake Gyllenhaal.

Mechner created the Prince for the first Prince of Persia game. His concepts for the character were drawn from Near Eastern mythology such as One Thousand and One Nights and Shahnameh, with his athleticism inspired by the opening of Raiders of the Lost Ark. The character's movements were created by Mechner by capturing footage of his brother and transferring them into the game using rotoscoping. The Prince was redesigned and rewritten for The Sands of Time, with his design maturing with each sequel. The 2008 reboot redesigned him around the concept of a prince in making.

While public and critical opinion of individual Princes has varied, the character in general has been positively received. The original Prince has been seen as a breakthrough in gameplay design, while his appearances in The Sands of Time have varied, with particular criticism being laid against his darker portrayal in Warrior Within (2004). The reboot Prince's portrayal has also divided public opinion due to his redesign and American-accented voice, while Gyllenhaal's portrayal of the character in the 2010 film has drawn mixed opinions from critics.

== Appearances ==
=== In video games ===
The Prince title refers to multiple characters who act as the main protagonist of the Prince of Persia franchise. The original Prince was the only survivor of a kingdom destroyed by a witch. Living as a street thief in an unspecified city, he met and won the heart of the city's Princess. During the events of the original Prince of Persia (1989), the vizier Jaffar attempts to seize control of the kingdom, and the Prince is imprisoned in the palace dungeons. He escapes, defeats the Vizier and saves the Princess. In Prince of Persia 2: The Shadow and the Flame (1993), the Prince is banished by a disguised Jaffar, ending up rediscovering his homeland and retrieving a magical power which defeats Jaffar for good. In Prince of Persia 3D (1999), the Prince must again rescue the Princess, this time from a former betrothed.

The Sands of Time sequence covers the Prince, as the son of Persian king Sharaman, from his early years through events which shape him into a leader. In Prince of Persia: The Sands of Time (2003), he inadvertently releases the Sands of Time after they are looted from an Indian city with an artifact called the Dagger of Time. With Farah, princess of the city, he attempts to contain the Sands before they infect the world, while the treacherous Vizier seeks to use them to achieve immortality. Farah dies during the adventure, but the Prince uses the Sands to reverse time, killing the Vizier and returning the Dagger to Farah. This action causes a being called the Dahaka to begin hunting the Prince for distorting history. By the events of Warrior Within (2004), seven years after The Sands of Time, the Prince is determined to undo the making of the Sands. He confronts the creator of the Sands, Kaileena the Empress of Time, and bonds with her as he learns her identity. He ultimately defeats the Dahaka and takes Kaileena to Babylon.

In The Two Thrones (2005), the Prince and Kaileena find that his actions in Warrior Within undid the Vizier's death. The Vizier kills Kaileena with the Dagger of Time, absorbing the Sands and turning into a god-like monster. The Prince is also infected by the Sands, manifesting an alternate Dark Prince personality. During his adventure, he reunites with Farah, accepts responsibility for his people after finding Sharaman's body, and eventually kills the Vizier. Kaileena's spirit removes the Sands and Dagger from the world, and in a final mental confrontation the Prince overcomes the Dark Prince's influence. Other stories from the seven years between The Sands of Time and Warrior Within are told in Battles of Prince of Persia (2005) and The Forgotten Sands (2010), showing events which changed the Prince's outlook on the world.

In the reboot Prince of Persia (2008), the Prince is not royal by birth, but instead his story and trials are destined to shape him into a ruler. The Prince becomes embroiled in a quest by the priestess Elika to reseal the dark god Ahriman. While ultimately successful, the ritual costs Elika's life. The Prince, mirroring the actions of Elika's father which originally released Ahriman, decides to bring Elika back to life, freeing Ahriman once again; a disappointed Elika abandons the Prince soon after. In The Fallen King, the Prince searches for a way to contain Ahriman's influence, fighting a corrupted king with help from the king's disembodied light side and a spirit dubbed the Ancestor.

In The Lost Crown (2024), the Prince is called Ghassan, reluctant heir to the Persian Empire, whose kidnapping to Mount Qaf triggers the game's events. The game's protagonist Sargon, one of an elite group dubbed the Immortals, is sent by Ghassan's mother Queen Thomyris to retrieve him. The Immortals' leader Vahram, revealed to be a displaced heir, orchestrated the plot due to the murder of his father by Thomyris. After Vahram's defeat, Sargon exposes Thomyris, and Ghassan abdicates. Another version of the Prince acts as the unnamed protagonist of The Rogue Prince of Persia (2025), here a young royal whose rash use of his time-bending powers causes a hostile land to attack with a magical army.

=== In other media ===
Multiple Prince characters were featured in Prince of Persia: The Graphic Novel (2008). The story takes place in a kingdom called Marv, alternating between the 9th and 13th centuries. The story follows two men of royal blood: Guiv, survivor of a deposed royal line who goes into self-imposed exile after clashing with his adopted brother; and Ferdos, hidden with the region's water keeper during a purge of newborn children to forestall a prophecy. Each is helped by a mystical bird named Tulen, with Guiv's actions in his time influencing Ferdos' own life.

For the 2010 movie adaptation, the Prince is given the name Dastan. Dastan is a street urchin adopted by the Persian king Sharaman. An adult Dastan is sent with his brothers to attack the city of Alamut on the word of Sharaman's brother Nizam, claiming the Dagger of Time which Alamut's princess Tamina keeps safe. Nizam, who wants to use the Sands' power to make himself king, kills Sharaman and frames Dastan. Now on the run, Dastan allies with Tamina to prevent Nizam's scheme. They all reach the Sands, and Tamina sacrifices herself when Nizam unlocks the Sands so the Prince can use them himself. Dastan turns back time while retaining the Dagger and his memories, allowing him to foil Nizam's plot. To make amends to Alamut, Dastan and Tamina enter a political marriage, with Dastan returning the Dagger to Tamina as an engagement gift.

== Recurring characteristics ==
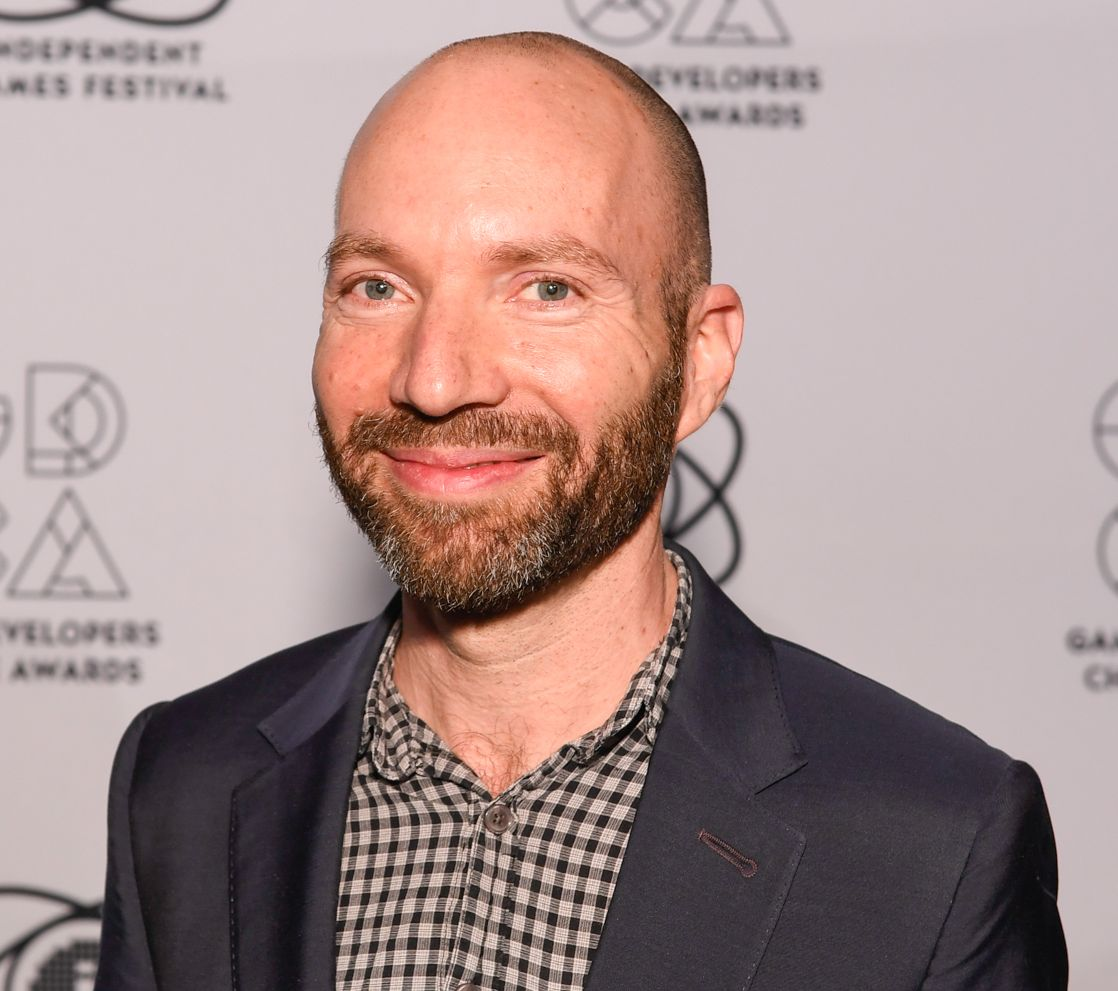
Jordan Mechner (pictured 2017), creator of the Prince of Persia series and character.

Throughout the franchise, the Prince has shared general traits; he has a desire for or is drawn into magical adventures, is skilled in acrobatics and combat, and is either of a royal line or associated with royalty. Series creator Jordan Mechner described the series' gameplay and its title character as "inseparable". Mechner further described the character as a version of the Trickster, a common story and folklore archetype. According to Ubisoft producer Ben Mattes, the concept of the Prince has become synonymous with the number of potential stories within the Prince of Persia series, comparing the various interpretations of his character with the One Thousand and One Nights. Within the video games, the character has never been given a name, being known only under his title of Prince.

Mechner has been involved in a variety of ways with the franchise; in addition to creating the original game, he acted as a writer and designer for The Sands of Time, worked on a graphic novel based on the concept, and wrote the story and original draft of the movie adaptation. When speaking about returning repeatedly to the character through different media, Mechner felt he never got bored or frustrated as he considered each incarnation of the Prince to be his own entity. He never expected to work on the character through multiple media, describing it as an opportunity "[he] could have only dreamed of" when he first created the Prince.

The version of the Prince that has gone through the most development is from The Sands of Time and its sequels. Mechner described the Prince as he is portrayed during the opening of The Sands of Time as "a daredevil who races ahead of the attacking army in order to gain "honor and glory" by being the first to steal a valuable trophy of war". Ceri Young, writer of The Forgotten Sands, described this young Prince as "arrogant and [craving] power". For Warrior Within, the Prince was turned into a darker, more callous character who had to face the consequences of his actions. For The Two Thrones, the developers played on previous themes of duality when creating both the Prince and his abilities. For The Forgotten Sands, he was given a personality much like that present in The Sands of Time, though wary of magic and unwilling to hold responsibility. He was also set to suffer hardships that would begin his change into what he appeared as in Warrior Within. Speaking in 2005, Mechner expressed his dislike for how the character had changed in Warrior Within, and that he approved of the shift in The Two Thrones to "returning to a game for kids as well as adults".

A doppelgänger appeared in both The Shadow and the Flame and The Two Thrones, commonly described as the Dark Prince or Shadowman. Shadowman was created by Mechner to add enemy variety within the first game's hardware limitations, creating a mirror version of the Prince that would impede his progress. In The Shadow and the Flame, Shadowman appears from the Prince to take on the magical power needed to defeat Jaffar. In The Two Thrones, the Dark Prince was a manifestation of the Prince's negative traits given its own will and voice by the Sands. The final scene where the Prince walks away from his dark side rather than fighting or accepting it was intended to show the character's maturity. The Dark Prince of The Two Thrones also acted as a reference to the original Shadowman.

=== Portrayal ===
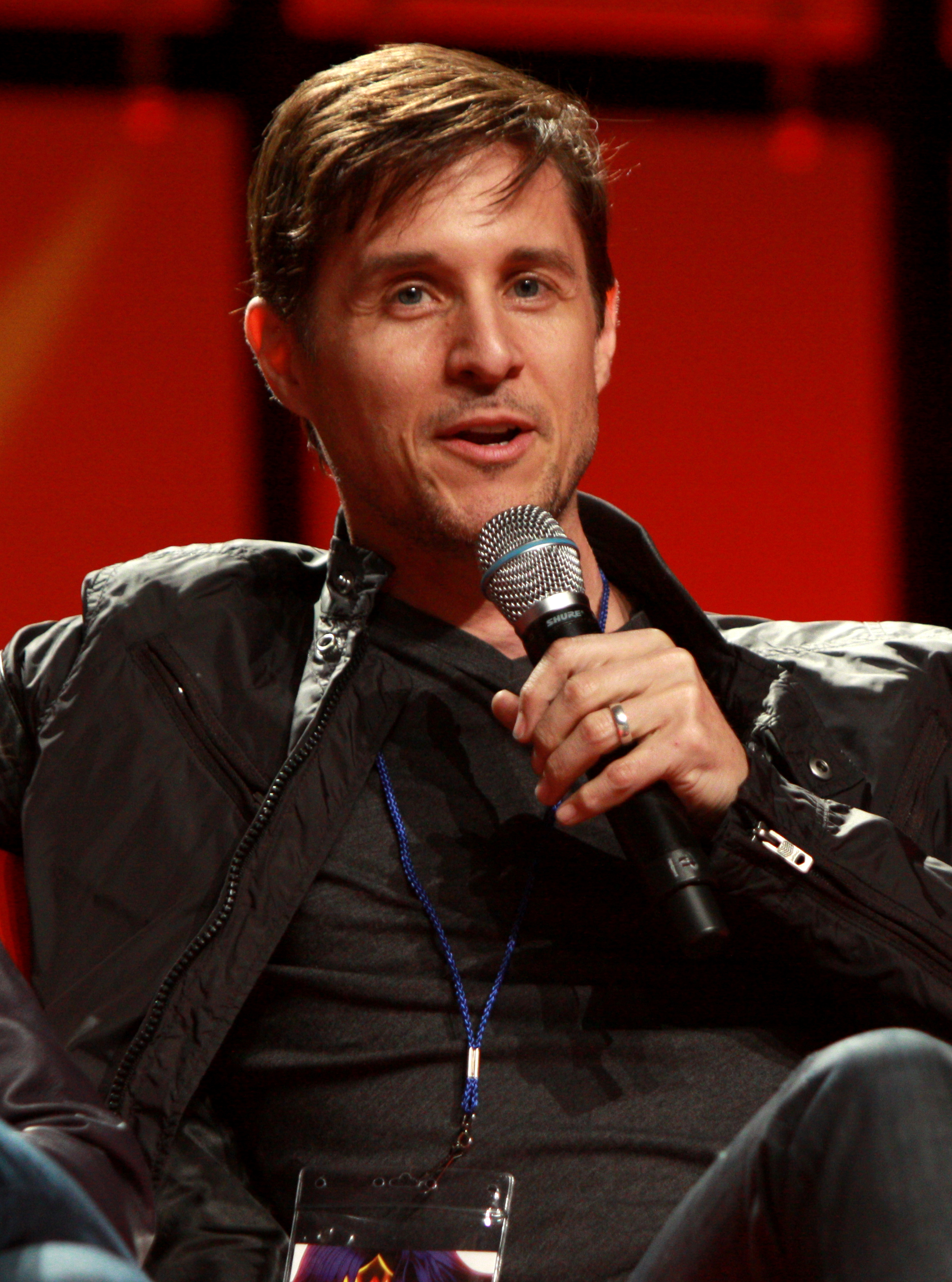
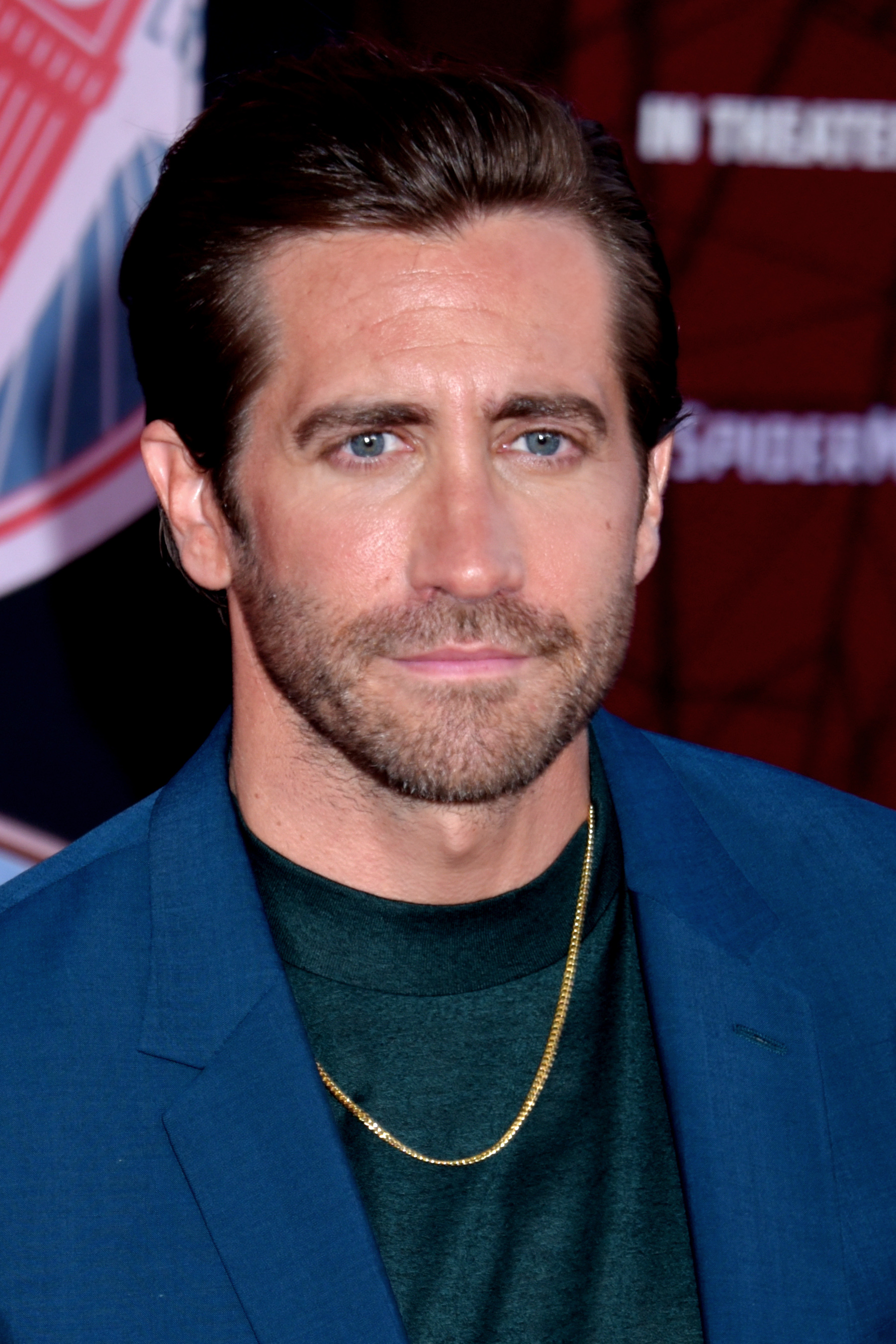
While many actors have voiced the Prince, Yuri Lowenthal (left, pictured 2013) has voiced the Prince most frequently, with it being one of his favourite roles. American actor Jake Gyllenhaal (right, pictured 2019) portrayed the character in the 2010 movie adaptation.

For the original Prince of Persia, the Prince was animated through rotoscoping based on recorded movements by Mechner's younger brother David. The Prince has had multiple voice actors portraying his various incarnations, most notably beginning with The Sands of Time. The known voice actors to have portrayed the Prince are Dave Boat (Prince of Persia 3D), Yuri Lowenthal (The Sands of Time series), Robin Atkin Downes (Warrior Within), Nolan North (2008 reboot), and Adam El Hagar (The Lost Crown).

In an interview about his long-running portrayal, Lowenthal said that "[he felt] that [he] in a way originated that role". The Prince became one of Lowenthal's favourite roles, and he was pleased to return to the role for The Forgotten Sands. He is also re-recording his voice lines for the upcoming Sands of Time remake. According to Lowenthal, his well-received performance put pressure on him in future Prince of Persia games, as he needed to improve his performance while staying true to his original portrayal. He felt that this limited his creative freedom with the character after The Sands of Time. Lowenthal was announced to reprise his role in a remake of The Sands of Time, in development for several years before its cancellation in 2026.

Lowenthal did not return to voice the Prince in Warrior Within, being replaced by Downes. This change was explained by Ubisoft staff as necessary due to the Prince's more hardened and world-worn portrayal, in addition to the new voice better fitting his redesigned appearance. Lowenthal thought it was the right decision given the tonal shift. For The Two Thrones, Lowenthal returned to play the role, as fans had stated their preference for his portrayal of the character. Downes was originally announced as the voice of the Dark Prince, but the character was voiced in the final game by Rick Miller. Miller received the role through the game's voice director Simon Peacock, who was a friend. As his first video game role, Miller found it challenging due to the need to record effort and death sounds.

For the reboot, the staff wanted a different portrayal of the Prince to Lowenthal's, and so recast the role. North voiced the Prince for the 2008 reboot, and in hindsight felt that he did not do the character justice. In a 2012 interview, he said that "[he] just didn't really feel like the American accent worked with the artistry that the game showed", further saying that he thought a Middle Eastern or British accent would have better suited the character.

The film character Dastan was portrayed by American actor Jake Gyllenhaal. Gyllenhaal said that there were several reasons that he chose to accept the role of the Prince, including the character's appeal to him, the fact that the film was based on the video game, and he "[liked] to do things that people have tried their hand at and haven't succeeded". In a pre-release interview, Mechner called Gyllenhaal right for the role as it fitted in with the Prince's inspiration in classic movie heroes. According to Gyllenhaal, he retrospectively felt he had over-prepared physically for his role as he knew little of what it entailed. He trained for five months prior to the beginning of filming in Morocco, and continued to train during the filming period. In a later interview Gyllenhaal expressed regret at accepting the role, feeling it was wrong for him as an actor.

== Concept and design ==
The Prince was created by Mechner as the protagonist of the original Prince of Persia. His inspiration for the character's athleticism was the opening ten minutes of Raiders of the Lost Ark, referencing the approach of main character Indiana Jones to situations encountered. Mechner was also influenced by Jones's portrayal as a vulnerable action hero. The character was based on multiple similar figures in ancient literature, including One Thousand and One Nights. Originally a plain figure in white clothing, the Prince was restyled for the game's Japanese release in a turban and baggy pants. This look pleased Mechner, and became associated with the character during the original trilogy.

Speaking on the Prince's role in The Shadow and the Flame, Mechner admitted to taking a hands-off approach due to his work on The Last Express (1997), and that he was growing tired of the character due to development pressures. Plot elements from the ending of The Shadow and the Flame were going to be continued in an unpronounced sequel relating to the Prince's origins. Speaking in 2010, Mechner said that during his time writing the series bible for the production of future Prince of Persia games, he was attempting to force the Prince into the conventions of western fiction, forgetting the character's literary origins. By the time Prince of Persia 3D was released in 1999 to a lukewarm response, Mechner was pleased that the Prince had run his course, as he no longer recognized the character he created.

=== The Sands of Time ===
The Prince's portrayal and appearance changed radically between The Sands of Time (left) and Warrior Within (right). The change divided critics and fans of the series.

For The Sands of Time, the character was completely redesigned, taking reference purely from the original game rather than Prince of Persia 3D. Mechner wrote the new story for the Prince purely for newcomers to the series, wanting the character to be memorable so as to provide a good "hook" for players together with the gameplay. He again drew inspiration from the opening of Raiders of the Lost Ark for the opening of The Sands of Time, and was pleased with his initially unsympathetic portrayal of the Prince. His inspiration for the character's more serious portrayal was the stories of the Shahnameh, although he later admitted that he could not entirely remove the influences of the original Prince. In his view: "It's [the Prince's] inability to solve this conflict that gives him his particular charm". For his gameplay model, the Prince had over 780 movement animations scripted, far more than any other character in the game. The Prince was designed by Raphael Lacoste, the game's art director, who went through multiple versions from a young boy to a bare-chested older man. His final look was partially determined by the aesthetics of the game's environments.

For Warrior Within, the development team decided to make the game's atmosphere darker. They also wanted to flesh the Prince out as a character, as they had felt something was lacking in The Sands of Time. With these concepts in mind, they decided the Prince would "grow up", with the story being more focused on his character than him saving a person or place. The two people most involved with the new design were art director Mikael Labat and illustrator Nicolas Bouvier. During the early stages, some hybrid designs with his appearance in The Sands of Time were created, but the team felt it was not radical enough. His "charisma" needed to be new, yet consistent with the events of The Sands of Time. His new armor reflected this change; it is made up of interlaced leather straps, granting him protection while giving him freedom to perform his acrobatic movements.

In The Two Thrones, the Prince was portrayed as a mature warrior able to hold his own. His appearance was roughened using scars, and his Sands infection designed to appear like a "living wound" more than a tattoo. The Prince's struggle with his malevolent side was the focal point of the narrative, forming part of a simplification of the series narrative following the complex time travel of Warrior Within. In The Forgotten Sands, the story was written around the Prince still being a developing character, learning what it takes to be a ruler and to take responsibility for his actions. His art design drew inspiration from his appearance in Warrior Within and The Two Thrones, which Jan-Erik Sjovall described as more visually appealing compared to the original Sands of Time.

=== Other versions ===
A third variation of the Prince appears in the 2008 reboot and its companion game The Fallen King. Mattes explained that the goal for the character design was to show his transformation into a prince through his epic journey. Additional inspiration was drawn from characters such as Sinbad from One Thousand and One Nights, Han Solo from Star Wars, and Aragorn from The Lord of the Rings. Mattes explained that when designing the character, Ubisoft wanted to communicate visually the dichotomy of the life of an adventurer. As a sign of wealth, the Prince wears red and blue cloth as a turban and scarves, contrasting against his protective plain leather leggings. The Prince also had a companion in the form of Elika. Their relationship was based on the story and gameplay relationship between the Prince in The Sands of Time and Farah, which had worked well. A version of the Prince was initially considered as protagonist for a next-generation title, but director Patrice Désilet decided a royal character was unsuitable, and the project evolved into the standalone game Assassin's Creed (2007). For The Lost Crown, which was designed as a modern take on the Prince of Persia concept, the Prince character was both named and relegated to a non-playable character.

When creating the movie version's draft script, Mechner chose the name "Dastan" as he had learned it was an old Persian name meaning "trickster". He took the name from a translation of the Shahnameh, and later felt it appropriate upon learning its alternate translation of "story". The name changes of characters including the Prince were also meant to indicate the film would not directly adapt The Sands of Time. Although Mechner's film script was written prior to finishing later games in the Sands of Time continuity, the film incorporated design elements from those games into the Prince's appearance. The character's costumes were designed by Penny Rose. For the Prince's most worn outfit, she designed a loose-fitting spiral coat based on a picture of ancient Persian embroidery. Her costumes also paid homage to the costume designs of the video games. Dastan's armor drew from his appearance in Warrior Within, coincidentally matching the art design for The Forgotten Sands.

Mechner co-authored the graphic novel with A. B. Sina, which was illustrated by LeUyen Pham and Alex Puvilland. Mechner, approached by publisher First Second Books about creating a book based on the character, felt the time was right to create a property independent of both the games and the movie adaptation. Sina was initially wary of the project, as he had negative experience of the portrayal of Middle Eastern people in Western media, and did not want to be controlled by marketing requirements, but Sina agreed to join the project after meeting Mechner and the editor for First Second Books. Sina's story played on the series concept of there being multiple Princes, writing his story around several Prince characters in different eras. Mechner described this approach as not suited to either a movie or a game due to its overt philosophical elements, feeling instead that it was well suited to a graphic novel. Mechner also co-wrote Before the Sandstorm, a graphic novel prequel to the film featuring several of the same artists. When creating it, he incorporated several in-jokes relating to both the original Prince of Persia and its inspirations.

== Reception ==
Video game publications, including Guinness World Records, described him as one of the greatest protagonists in video games. In an article for Retro Gamer concerning the creation of the series, David Crookes noted the Prince's importance as an early example of the acrobatic lead character, comparing him to later game leads including Lara Croft.

Critics and fans praised the Prince's portrayal in The Sands of Time continuity, and this is generally seen as the most popular version of the character. The Prince's change into a darker character for Warrior Within saw mixed reactions, with fans and many critics seeing it as a change for the worse. Others praised the change, such as Heather Newman of Detroit Free Press. Despite the mixed critic and fan reception, Ubisoft have defended the change as a legitimate evolution of the Prince's character. The Prince's portrayal in The Two Thrones both pleased Mechner and was more favorably received by critics and fans. GameSpot's Bob Colayco saw this latest portrayal as an interesting self-reference to the criticism, suggesting that "the internal strife in the schizophrenic prince's mind forms a compelling part of the storyline".

The Prince from the 2008 reboot was well received by video game critics, but criticized by fans of the series, whose main complaint was the performance of North in the role. In an article concerning Prince of Persia reboot, Gamasutra editor Tom Cross did not understand the negative reactions, seeing comparisons of the new Prince to Nathan Drake as unfair despite the Prince being a less likeable character. In a review for IGN, Hilary Goldstein enjoyed the interactions in gameplay and story between the Prince and Elika, but disliked his personality due to his acerbic manner and frequent "groan-worthy" lines. By contrast, Matt Miller of Game Informer praised the game for communicating a genuine emotional bond between the Prince and Elika, describing it as a rarity in the gaming medium.

Commenting on the Prince's portrayal in the film, Chicago Sun-Times film critic Roger Ebert felt Gyllenhaal "plays Dastan as if harboring Spider-Man's doubts and insecurities", clashing with his physical appearance. By contrast, Chris Tilly of IGN praised Gyllenhaal's portrayal as the Prince, citing him as a highlight of the movie overall. Gyllenhaal's appearance and especially his haircut for the role of the Prince were ridiculed by several sources, but was defended by Ghazzal Dabiri, a lecturer and coordinator of Iranian studies at Columbia University. The film was also criticized for whitewashing the cast. Brian Ashcraft of Kotaku admitted the criticism and wished Iranian actors had been cast in the leads, though felt the criticism overlooked wider ethnic representation issues in the industry.
