= Prince of Persia =

Video game franchise

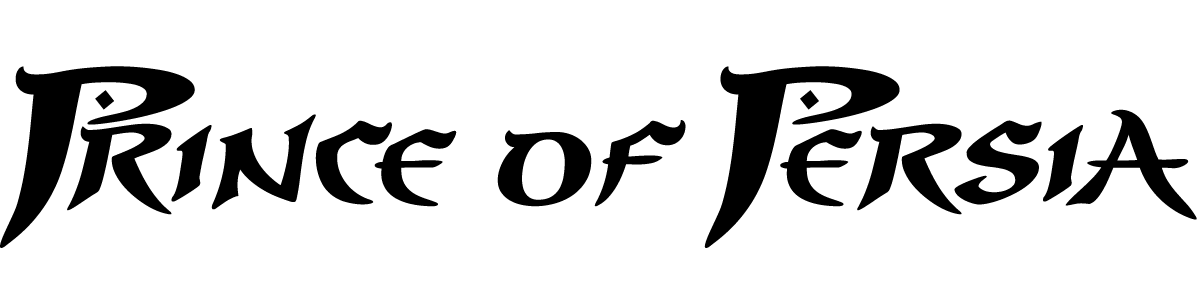
- Genres: Cinematic platform; Action-adventure; Hack and slash
- Developers: Broderbund; Red Orb Entertainment; Avalanche Software; Ubisoft Montreal; Pipeworks Software; Gameloft; Gameloft Montreal; Ubisoft Quebec; Ubisoft Pune; Ubisoft Montpellier; Evil Empire
- Publishers: Broderbund; The Learning Company; Mattel Interactive; Ubisoft; Gameloft
- Creator: Jordan Mechner
- Platforms: MS-DOS; Android; Java ME; Windows; iOS; Xbox; Xbox 360; Xbox One; Xbox Series X/S; Amiga; Apple II; Atari ST; Dreamcast; Master System; FM Towns; Mac OS X; Game Boy Advance; Game Boy Color; GameCube; Nintendo DS; Nintendo Entertainment System; PlayStation 2; PlayStation 3; PlayStation 4; PlayStation 5; PlayStation Portable; SAM Coupé; Genesis; Super NES; TurboGrafx-CD; Wii; PC-98; X68000; Amstrad CPC; Game Boy; Sega CD; Mac; Game Gear; BlackBerry; Nintendo 3DS; Nintendo Switch
- First release: Prince of Persia; October 3, 1989
- Latest release: The Rogue Prince of Persia; August 20, 2025

Prince of Persia is a video game franchise created by Jordan Mechner. It is centered around a series of action-adventure games focused on various incarnations of the eponymous Prince, set in ancient and medieval Persia.

The first two games in the series, Prince of Persia (1989) and Prince of Persia 2: The Shadow and the Flame (1993), were published by Broderbund. Prince of Persia 3D (1999), named for being the first installment to use 3D computer graphics, was developed by Red Orb Entertainment and published by The Learning Company on PC; the Dreamcast version was developed by Avalanche Software and published by Mattel Interactive. In 2001, Ubisoft bought the rights to the franchise and later rebooted the series with Prince of Persia: The Sands of Time (2003).. Ubisoft has since developed and published five additional entries in the series: Prince of Persia: Warrior Within (2004), Prince of Persia: The Two Thrones (2005), Prince of Persia (2008), Prince of Persia: The Forgotten Sands (2010), and Prince of Persia: The Lost Crown (2024), as well as a number of spin-offs and games for mobile devices (by Gameloft). A remake of Prince of Persia: The Sands of Time was announced in 2020, but it was cancelled at the beginning of 2026.

Outside of the games, the franchise includes a film adaptation, a graphic novel and the Lego Prince of Persia toyline. Ubisoft's Assassin's Creed franchise is considered to be the spiritual successor to the series.

== Games ==
Release timeline Original continuity The Sands of Time continuity Reboot continuity Other continuities
1989	Prince of Persia
1990
1991
1992
1993	Prince of Persia 2: The Shadow and the Flame
1994
1995
1996
1997
1998
1999	Prince of Persia 3D
2000
2001
2002	Prince of Persia: Harem Adventures
2003	Prince of Persia: The Sands of Time
2004	Prince of Persia: Warrior Within
2005	Prince of Persia: Revelations
2005	Prince of Persia: The Two Thrones
2005	Battles of Prince of Persia
2006	Prince of Persia Trilogy
2007	Prince of Persia: Rival Swords
2007	Prince of Persia Classic
2008	Prince of Persia
2008	Prince of Persia: The Fallen King
2009
2010	Prince of Persia: The Forgotten Sands
2010	Prince of Persia: The Forgotten Sands (Wii)
2010	Prince of Persia: The Forgotten Sands (DS)
2010	Prince of Persia: The Forgotten Sands (PSP)
2011
2012
2013	Prince of Persia: The Shadow and the Flame (remake)
2014
2015
2016
2017
2018	Prince of Persia: Escape
2019
2020	Prince of Persia: The Dagger of Time
2021
2022	Prince of Persia: Escape 2
2023
2024	Prince of Persia: The Lost Crown
2025	The Rogue Prince of Persia

=== Original trilogy ===
The first game in the series was created by Jordan Mechner after the success of Karateka. Drawing from multiple general sources of inspiration, including the One Thousand and One Nights stories, and films like Raiders of the Lost Ark and The Adventures of Robin Hood, the protagonist's character animation was created using a technique called rotoscoping, with Mechner using his brother as the model for the titular prince. The original Prince of Persia, with its more than 20 platform ports, is one of the most ported games in video game history.

Mechner enrolled in New York University's film department, producing an award-winning short film during his time there, before returning to design and direct a sequel to the original game. The sequel, Prince of Persia 2: The Shadow and the Flame, was developed internally at Broderbund with Mechner's supervision. The game, like its predecessor, received critical acclaim and high sales. Broderbund was subsequently purchased by The Learning Company, which was later acquired by US game company Mattel Interactive. In 1999, Prince of Persia 3D was developed and released under Broderbund's Red Orb label. Released for PC and the Dreamcast only, it was criticized by many users as being buggy, and was a commercial disappointment. The Broderbund/Learning Company's games division, the assets of which included the Prince of Persia franchise, was subsequently sold to Ubisoft.

=== The Sands of Time series ===
Mechner, who owned the Prince of Persia intellectual property, was brought in to work with Ubisoft on a reboot of the franchise, titled The Sands of Time, although he was originally wary after the failure of Prince of Persia 3D. The team they worked with was also working on Tom Clancy's Splinter Cell: their aim with the game was to "breathe new life into the action-adventure genre".

Mechner did not take part in the production of the next game, Prince of Persia: Warrior Within, and he commented on finding the dark atmosphere and heightened level of violence unappealing. The changes also provoked mixed reactions from critics, but sales were strong and a third game, eventually titled Prince of Persia: The Two Thrones, went into production. For The Two Thrones, the developers and artists tried to strike a balance between the light, cartoon-like tones of The Sands of Time, and the grittier mediums of Warrior Within.

A fourth installment in The Sands of Time series, Prince of Persia: The Forgotten Sands, was released in May 2010. The Windows, Xbox 360 and PlayStation 3 versions of the game filled in some of the narrative gap between The Sands of Time and Warrior Within, whereas the PSP, Wii, and the DS versions each feature their own alternative storylines. The game was released as a tie in to The Sands of Time film adaptation.

==== Trilogy collection ====
The Prince of Persia Trilogy (known as Prince of Persia Trilogy 3D on the remastered collection's title screen) is a collection of The Sands of Time trilogy released on the PlayStation 2 and subsequently on the PlayStation 3 as part of the Classics HD range. The collection includes The Sands of Time, Warrior Within and The Two Thrones, all previously released on the PlayStation 2, Xbox and Microsoft Windows. The games were remastered in high-definition for the PlayStation 3 with 3D and PlayStation Network Trophy support on one Blu-ray Disc. The PlayStation 2 collection was released on October 27, 2006, in Europe, while the remastered collection was released on November 19, 2010, on Blu-ray in PAL regions. The release marks the first Classics HD title to not be published by Sony Computer Entertainment.

In North America, the three games were originally released separately as downloadable-only titles on the PlayStation Store. The first, The Sands of Time, was released on November 16, 2010, while the other two games followed in December. The Blu-ray version was to be released in North America on March 22, 2011 but the collection ended up being delayed until April 19.

=== Prince of Persia 2008 reboot series ===
In 2006, concept designs surfaced hinting at another entry in the franchise. The game, titled simply Prince of Persia, is a second reboot of the franchise, with its level and combat design harking back to the original 1989 game. The game was released in December 2008, receiving positive reviews from most video game outlets and decent sales. Alongside the main game, Ubisoft's Casablanca branch developed a direct sequel and spin-off for the Nintendo DS, titled Prince of Persia: The Fallen King, which received fair reviews.

=== Spin-offs and remakes ===
The first spin-off of the series was developed alongside and released in the same year as The Two Thrones for the Nintendo DS. Battles of Prince of Persia is a turn-based strategy game set between The Sands of Time and Warrior Within. It received mediocre reviews from critics.

In 2007, Gameloft and Ubisoft released Prince of Persia Classic, an enhanced remake of the original Prince of Persia for Java ME, Android, iOS, Xbox 360 (XBLA), and PlayStation 3 (PSN). It is developed by Gameloft's internal studio Gameloft Montreal. The visual style was upgraded to resemble Prince of Persia: The Sands of Time, and the Prince himself was given some additional moves, such as the ability to roll, backflip, wall jump and stop time briefly during combat. However, the core gameplay remains the same as the original – the player must defeat Jaffar within one hour while watching out for the many traps and defeating the guards they encounter.

There have been a number of mobile games for Java ME-based phones developed by Gameloft, some based on older PC or console titles with 2D graphics and others loosely based on contemporary games but with 2D graphics and different gameplay due to technology constraints. Gameloft has also developed some ports for both the iPhone and the iPad. The first spin-off by Gameloft was titled Prince of Persia: Harem Adventures, released for Java phones in 2003. Specifically, the company has developed (via its Gameloft Montreal studio) HD remakes of the original Prince of Persia in 2007, and its sequel (via Gameloft Pune, a studio which now belongs to Ubisoft) The Shadow and the Flame in July 2013.

In 2018, Ubisoft under the banner of its entity Ketchapp released Prince of Persia: Escape, a mobile game for Android and iOS. It is a runner game made up of different levels, and the player can customize the protagonist with outfits from past games. Reviewing for Pocket Gamer, Cameron Bald called Prince of Persia: Escape a "mundane game crushed under the weight of excessive greed". In August 2022, a follow-up, Prince of Persia: Escape 2, was released.

In January 2024, Ubisoft released the first major installment in the series since The Forgotten Sands, Prince of Persia: The Lost Crown. It is a 2.5D side-scrolling platformer and introduces a new storyline and protagonist, Sargon, a member of the Immortals.

The Rogue Prince of Persia is a 2.5D roguelike title developed by Evil Empire and released on August 20, 2025 on PlayStation 5, Xbox Series X|S, Xbox Cloud, and PC – through Ubisoft Connect, Steam, and the Epic Games Store – and will be coming to Switch 2 and Switch later in 2025. The game entered development around 2019, after a discussion between Evil Empire and Ubisoft at GDC, and its art direction is heavily inspired by Franco-Belgian comics. The game was Ubisoft's first day-one Steam release in five years, as well as their first title to be released in Early Access before a full release.

== Canceled and unreleased games ==
=== Prince of Persia Redemption ===
In 2012, leaked images from a project entitled Osiris were assumed to be the next Prince of Persia title. Jordan Mechner even commented on his Twitter account that the images were not from a Prince of Persia game. A year later, Yannis Mallat, CEO of Ubisoft Montreal, said that the franchise was being "paused", saying that "as soon as we have something to show, we will". In the following months, Ubisoft confirmed that it was either planning or considering next-generation entries in multiple franchises, including Prince of Persia. A video uploaded by a Ubisoft Montreal artist in 2012 but only discovered in 2020 showed a gameplay trailer for Prince of Persia Redemption which would have been released for Windows, Xbox 360, and PlayStation 3. According to Jonathan Cooper, a former Ubisoft animator at the time, the trailer was a mockup of the planned gameplay for the title created by Khai Nguyen, used to pitch the game concept. The game never developed beyond that point, though the work on the pitch trailer was used to prepare a similar trailer for Assassin's Creed III.

=== The Sands of Time remake ===
A remake of the Sands of Time, formally announced at Ubisoft Forward 2020, was originally scheduled for release on January 21, 2021, for Microsoft Windows, PlayStation 4 and Xbox One, but Ubisoft delayed the remake indefinitely. In its quarterly financial report, Ubisoft stated that the remake was expected to be out sometime during its 2022–23 fiscal year. The remake's development was moved to Ubisoft Montréal, a change from Ubisoft Mumbai and Ubisoft Pune. The company said the 2023 fiscal year release target was no longer being targeted. A new release window of 2026 was announced at Ubisoft Forward 2024. Ubisoft officially canceled the remake on January 21, 2026 with the announcement of a major restructuring of the company.

== Adaptations ==
=== Graphic novel ===
Jordan Mechner finished writing the story for a graphic novel in 2007. The novel was written by A.B. Sina, and illustrated by Alex Puvilland and LeUyen Pham. It was released by First Second Books in autumn 2008. The story follows two Princes, jumping between the 9th and 13th centuries. Although it belongs to the franchise the plot is not related to any of the game continuities or that of the 2010 film.

=== Film adaptation ===
In 2010, a film adaptation of The Sands of Time was released by Walt Disney Pictures. Starring Jake Gyllenhaal as Prince Dastan, it would go on to receive mixed reception, but still gross $336 million in theaters. Besides The Sands of Time, the film also incorporated elements from Warrior Within and The Two Thrones, the two other titles from the Sands of Time trilogy of the Prince of Persia video game franchise.

Upon the film's release, it was accompanied by Before the Sandstorm, a 2010 one-shot comic book published by Disney Publishing Worldwide. This comic serves as both a direct prequel and sequel to the feature film, and explains the motives and backgrounds of some characters. It was written by Jordan Mechner and featured illustrations by Todd McFarlane, Niko Henrichon, David Lopez and Bernard Chang.

=== Lego ===
Lego Prince of Persia was released by The Lego Group in 2010, as part of the company's strategy to produce sets based on Disney properties. Based on the feature film, Lego released six sets within the theme, as well as a short animated film, before discontinuing it.

== Reception ==
=== Awards ===
The success of the Prince of Persia series resulted in Guinness World Records awarding the series six world records in the Guinness World Records: Gamer's Edition 2008. These records include First Motion-Capture Animation in a Video Game and Highest Rated Platformer on PS2 and Xbox.

=== Impact and legacy ===
South Korean singer-songwriter Kim Kwang-Jin released the song 'Magic Castle', with lyrics inspired from the storyline of the original Prince of Persia.

In 1992, Russian author Victor Pelevin wrote a book called A Werewolf Problem in Central Russia and Other Stories, in which there is a short story called "Prince of Gosplan". The story is greatly influenced by the game; the main hero of the story lives in a mixed reality of the real world and video games and identifies himself as the Prince of Persia. He tries to understand if his life is real or if he is just seeing it on a computer display.

The feel of the gameplay in Tomb Raider was intended to evoke that of the original Prince of Persia.

The Assassin's Creed series originated out of ideas for a sequel for Prince of Persia: The Sands of Time. Its critical and financial success led Ubisoft to request Ubisoft Montreal to develop a sequel, aiming for the Xbox 360 and PlayStation 3. The Ubisoft Montreal team decided on taking the gameplay from The Sands of Time into an open world approach, taking advantage of the improved processing power to render larger spaces and crowds. Narratively, the team wanted to move away from the Prince being someone next in line for the throne but to have to work for it; combined with research into secret societies led them to focus on the Assassins, heavily borrowing from the novel Alamut. They developed a narrative where the player would control an Assassin that served as a bodyguard for a non-playable Prince, leading them to call this game Prince of Persia: Assassin. The "Animus" device allowed them to explain certain facets of gameplay, such as accounting when the player fails a mission, in the same way they had done in The Sands of Time.
