= Prince of Persia (2008 video game) =

- Developer: Ubisoft Montreal
- Publisher: Ubisoft
- Director: Jean-Christophe Guyot
- Producers: Bertrand Helias; Ben Mattes
- Designers: Thomas Delbuguet; Kevin Guillemette
- Programmer: Charles Jacob
- Artist: Mickael Labat
- Writer: Andrew Walsh
- Composers: Stuart Chatwood; Inon Zur
- Series: Prince of Persia
- Engine: Scimitar
- Platforms: PlayStation 3; Xbox 360; Windows; Mac OS X; Java ME
- Release: December 2, 2008: PlayStation 3, Xbox 360; NA: December 2, 2008; AU: December 4, 2008; EU: December 5, 2008 Windows; NA: December 9, 2008; AU: December 11, 2008; EU: December 12, 2008 OS X; WW: March 24, 2009
- Genres: Action-adventure, platform
- Mode: Single-player

Prince of Persia is a 2008 action-adventure game developed by Ubisoft Montreal and published by Ubisoft. It is the seventh main installment in the Prince of Persia franchise, and the second reboot, establishing a new continuity that is separate from other games in the series. It was released in the United States on December 2, 2008, for PlayStation 3 and Xbox 360, and on December 9 for Windows. It was released on March 24, 2009, for Mac OS X via the Cider engine. The game was also released on November 11, 2008, by Gameloft for mobile phones; this version runs on the Java platform in a 2D environment, and has a feature of enabling the players to control a second character at certain points of the various levels of the game.

The game is set in ancient Persia and follows an unnamed player-character, who finds himself in a mysterious land after a large sandstorm diverted him from his course. Here, he meets a princess named Elika and must work with her to re-imprison the evil entity Ahriman, who has corrupted the land after being released by Elika's father. Throughout the journey, players traverse many different environments using their acrobatic abilities to scale walls and even crawl on ceilings, and combat various enemies. The game's storyline and setting borrowed some aspects from Zoroastrianism.

Prince of Persia received generally positive reviews from critics, and has sold over 2.5 million copies as of November 2009. An expansion pack that serves as an epilogue to the story was released in March 2009. The only other game in the series set in this continuity is Prince of Persia: The Fallen King, released in December 2008 for the Nintendo DS.

== Gameplay ==
Prince of Persia revolves around gameplay mechanics that producer Ben Mattes identifies as "pillars" of the Prince of Persia series; an acrobatic hero exploring a Persian environment with a balanced mixture of acrobatics, combat, and puzzle-solving. The premise of Prince of Persia is that the player travels around the game world to heal specially designated spots of land. The player assumes the role of the acrobatic character, and is accompanied by the AI-controlled companion named Elika. The player can use the Prince character's acrobatic prowess, sword, and gauntlet, as well as magic from Elika to perform combat and acrobatic feats variously throughout the game.

Prince of Persia features open world exploration that allows the player to travel to any spot in the game world at any given point, and allows the player to witness the plot in any way they want. Depending on how the player progresses, previously visited areas will become more challenging to traverse when the player re-visits them. When the player heals a spot of land, it becomes devoid of traps. The traps are manifested in various forms of the antagonist Ahriman's Corruption; black-colored blobs that coat the land and swallow the player if touched. The player can use acrobatic maneuvers to avoid these traps.

The player has many acrobatic maneuvers at their disposal. Acrobatics are also used in combat to vault over enemies, or hit them into the air. Sometimes when performing these acrobatics, the player is aided by Elika. There are magical plates that allow the player to perform even more complicated acrobatic feats via Elika. If the player fails to signal Elika's magic, they fall off of the plate, sometimes to their death.

The player cannot conventionally "die" in Prince of Persia. Rather, when an enemy is about to strike the finishing blow, or The Prince presumably falls to his death, Elika saves him. There is no limit on the number of times Elika can save a player, although an achievement is awarded for being saved fewer than 100 times during a playthrough. Along with saving the player, Elika can perform many acrobatic feats or combat feats in tandem with the player. The downloadable content Epilogue added a new magic plate that allows Elika to recreate destroyed objects. A new combat maneuver for the player was also added.

== Synopsis ==
=== Setting ===
Prince of Persia takes place in an undefined ancient Persian city-state based heavily around the religion of Zoroastrianism. A thousand years before the events of the game take place, there was a struggle for power between the gods Ahriman and Ormazd. The outcome of the struggle was that Ormazd and his people, the Ahura, managed to imprison Ahriman and his minions, the Corrupted, in a tree. Ormazd then left the world, leaving the Ahura to make sure Ahriman remains secure. They are successful for a thousand years, at which point the Ahura started to lose their powers, so they leave. Shortly before the events of the game, Ahriman is about to be freed again.

=== Characters ===
Prince of Persia's protagonist is a nameless adventurer in search of fortune. The adventurer is accompanied by an Ahura named Elika, whose race has forsaken the duty given to them by the god of light, Ormazd, and intend to set free the main antagonist, Ahriman, the god of darkness who was imprisoned by Ormazd. He is intent on conquering the entire universe upon his liberation. The Mourning King appears as an antagonist, intent on fulfilling his deal with Ahriman in return for the resurrection of his daughter, Elika. The Corrupted, four rulers Ahriman chose to aid him in conquering Ormazd, also appear as antagonists. They were imprisoned with him for a thousand years.

The Hunter is one of the Corrupted. He was a prince who enjoyed hunting, but soon became too good at hunting. Ahriman successfully made a deal with the Hunter that, in exchange for his soul, Ahriman would allow him to hunt a creature more satisfying than any he has hunted before. Another of the Corrupted is the Alchemist. He was an Ahura scientist who felt he was close to achieving immortality when his health started to fail. The Alchemist asked Ormazd for a longer lifespan to complete his research, but when he was refused, Ahriman offered him immortality in exchange for his soul. The third Corrupted is called the Concubine. She was a woman skilled in politics who revered men of power. She was involved with a man, but was ultimately beaten by another woman, scarred and stripped of her beauty and influence. The Concubine then exchanged her soul for the power of illusion with Ahriman. The fourth and strongest of the Corrupted is the Warrior. He was a king whose country was under siege. Struggling for peace, the king accepted power from Ahriman that allowed him to vanquish his enemies and secure peace for his people. However, when the war was over, the peace-loving citizens rejected the Warrior, who had turned into a tool of war.

=== Plot ===
The game begins with the Prince (voiced by Nolan North) wandering in search of his donkey, Farah, in the middle of a desert sandstorm. He then runs into Elika (Kari Wahlgren), a princess of the Ahura, who is fleeing from soldiers. The two fend off the soldiers, with Elika discovering her magical powers of light. The Prince follows her into a temple which houses Ahriman (voiced by both Catherine Kidd and Kwasi Songui), a force of evil who is trapped within a tree known as the Tree of Life. Once inside the temple, the Prince and Elika are confronted by Elika's father, the Mourning King (Fred Tatasciore), who faces them in battle. After the fight, he uses his sword to cut the Tree of Life, setting Ahriman free. The Prince and Elika escape the temple, only to find a corrupted world outside.

Elika tells the Prince that in order to restore the world and rid the corruption inhabiting it, they must heal all the Fertile Grounds in the kingdom. They then begin restoring the Fertile Grounds, encountering the Warrior, the Hunter, the Concubine, and the Alchemist; four corrupted leaders Ahriman chose to set free.

In the journey, it is revealed that Elika had died prior to the beginning of the game. Her father took her to Ahriman and asked him to revive her, selling his soul in the process to Ahriman, thus making him one of the corrupted. Once Elika was revived she discovered she had new-found powers. As the game progresses Elika gains more powers and abilities, and the two encounter the Mourning King throughout the game. After healing all the Fertile Grounds, as well as defeating all bosses, Elika and the Prince return to the temple to imprison Ahriman. Once inside however, they are confronted by the Mourning King, who is now a fully corrupted being. After defeating him, he calls his daughter's name and turns away from them, throwing himself off the platform they are on. Ahriman rises from the corruption below. They battle him, but Elika must give up her very life to finish the spell to seal Ahriman away. Once the spell is completed Elika dies once again.

The Prince then takes Elika's body outside. There are four Fertile Grounds there, each with a tree that, according to what Elika had told him, channel the power of all the Fertile Grounds to the Tree of Life. He is given a vision (the same one both he and Elika shared much earlier that showed the Mourning King's deal with Ahriman to revive Elika). The vision (just like the main debate throughout the game between Elika and the Prince) is all about Destiny vs Free Will. The Prince re-creates the deal made by the Mourning King; he destroys the four Fertile Grounds around the Temple and returns inside. He cuts down the Tree of Life and takes the light power Elika used to heal the Tree, then returns the Light to Elika's body, and she returns to life. The game ends with the Prince carrying Elika across the desert while Ahriman's darkness envelops the world and the Temple is destroyed.

=== Epilogue ===
In Epilogue, an optional expansion pack set after the main story, it is shown that the Prince and Elika survive and retreat to an underground palace. Elika, furious with the Prince for dooming the world to save her, abandons him, but reunites with him to once again battle the Mourning King. They escape, and attempt to leave the palace alive. Along the way Elika shows her frustration with the Prince multiple times, believing that bringing her back was not worth the price of the evil it unleashed. The Prince counters that by freeing her, they "stand a chance" against Ahriman. In a final battle against the Mourning King, the Prince defeats him by impaling him on spikes (a visual reference to the original Prince of Persia game). In the end, Elika leaves the Prince to search for her people, and the Prince is left alone with a bloodthirsty Ahriman seeking revenge.

== Development ==
Proof of conception for Prince of Persia was found in September 2006, when a file that was leaked to the internet was found to contain concept art for the game, although Ubisoft didn't announce the game until May 2008. They said that they expected to release the game towards the fourth quarter of 2008, and gave details about the plot and game play. In one such preview of the game, they revealed that the general staples of the game play remained intact, although altered drastically. These staples are platforming, combat, and puzzle-solving. It was also revealed that the game's combat would be one-on-one fights, similar to the original Prince of Persia trilogy, rather than fighting hordes of enemies at any time, as in the Sands of Time series. Producer Ben Mattes said that the intent in changing the combat so drastically was to give players the impression that each enemy was a unique and dramatic experience in itself. Prince of Persia utilizes a heavily modified version of the Scimitar engine, which was also used in Assassin's Creed. Developers chose to use this engine because it would allow them to enhance the game by adding more expansive worlds, and less linearity. In May 2008, Ubisoft released two official videos of a concept artist designing the Prince character and Elika. One video shows the Prince character being drawn, while the other details Elika. Another fast-forward concept art emerged in July, this time depicting an antagonist the Hunter. Unlike previous Ubisoft games such as Assassin's Creed, the PC version of Prince of Persia contains no digital rights protection.

Mattes said that when Ubisoft was initially developing the game, cooperative gameplay with an AI-controlled partner was the main idea they wanted to build on. Mattes explained: "We knew from day one basically cooperative gameplay was the hook that was going to replace Sands of Time... We didn't always know that it was going to be Elika from day one... We sort of explored the idea of maybe a child or father figure or brother, or something like that". The idea to base the game around AI-controlled functions came from Prince of Persia: The Sands of Time. Mattes explained that the team felt the relationship between Farah and the Prince character worked well from a story-telling point-of-view in Prince of Persia: The Sands of Time, so they decided to expand on the concept.

=== Downloadable content ===
Downloadable content for Prince of Persia, titled Epilogue, includes new areas to explore, new enemies, new combat maneuvers, and a new power for Elika to use. The content was planned for release on February 26, 2009, on the Xbox 360 and PlayStation 3 consoles, but was delayed one week, releasing on March 5. Citing business reasons, Ubisoft did not release Epilogue for the PC version of the game.

== Reception ==
Reception

Aggregate scores
Aggregator	Score
GameRankings	(PS3) 84.14% (X360) 80.63% (PC) 79.60%
Metacritic	(PS3) 85/100 (PC) 82/100 (X360) 81/100

Review scores
Publication	Score
Destructoid	9.5/10
Edge	5/10
Electronic Gaming Monthly	8/10
Eurogamer	6/10
Game Informer	8.75/10
GamePro	5/5
GameRevolution	B
GameSpot	8/10
GameSpy	4.5/5
GameTrailers	8.7/10
GameZone	9/10 (PC) 8.8/10
IGN	(UK) 9.4/10 (US) 9.3/10 (AU) 8.7/10
Official Xbox Magazine (US)	8/10
PC Gamer (US)	78%
The A.V. Club	B−
Variety	(favorable)

The game was well received by most critics, scoring an 81%, 85%, and 82% on Metacritic for the Xbox 360, PlayStation 3, and PC, respectively.

IGN writer Hilary Goldstein praised the game for its simple but visually spectacular acrobatics and combat, but noted that one must "embrace the change [to the series]" in order to "fall in love [with it]". Goldstein also praised Elika, the secondary character of the game, as a useful sidekick during gameplay and also as a likeable character with a great relationship with the Prince.

GameSpot's Kevin VanOrd shared a similar opinion and in addition praised its excellent artistic design.

However, many criticized the game for being too easy or "consumer-friendly", regarding the simple platforming and combat segments. Eurogamer described it as a "poor game" with "excessive repetition" but nonetheless with "fantastic technology and interesting mechanics". 1UP.com criticized the trial-and-error nature of the platforming gameplay.

Many comparisons have been drawn to other video games in terms of artistic design and gameplay. Examples include Mirror's Edge and Ubisoft's own Assassin's Creed with unique platforming and timing-based combat. The vast open-world environment with intense boss fights have been compared to Ico and Shadow of the Colossus, and the watercolor looks to Ōkami.

=== Sales ===
In 2009, Prince of Persia has sold over 2.2 million copies worldwide in January and by November, the game had over 2.5 million copies worldwide.

=== Awards ===
In February 2009, the Academy of Interactive Arts & Sciences awarded Prince of Persia with "Outstanding Achievement in Animation" at the 12th Annual Interactive Achievement Awards; it also received nominations for "Adventure Game of the Year", and outstanding achievement in "Art Direction" and "Sound Design".
