= Prince of Persia: The Sands of Time =

2003 video game

- Developer: Ubisoft Montreal (Note: Ported to Windows by Kudosoft. Gameloft developed the mobile version.)
- Publisher: Ubisoft (Note: Gameloft published the mobile version.)
- Director: Patrice Désilets
- Producer: Yannis Mallat
- Designer: Jordan Mechner
- Programmer: Claude Langlais
- Artist: Raphaël Lacoste
- Writer: Jordan Mechner
- Composer: Stuart Chatwood
- Series: Prince of Persia
- Engine: Jade
- Platforms: Game Boy Advance; PlayStation 2 GameCube; Xbox; Windows; Mobile
- Release: 11 November 2003: Game Boy Advance; NA: 28 October 2003; EU: 14 November 2003 PlayStation 2; NA: 11 November 2003; EU: 21 November 2003 Xbox; NA: 11 November 2003; EU: 20 February 2004 GameCube; NA: 18 November 2003; EU: 20 February 2004 Mobile; NA: 21 November 2003 Microsoft Windows; NA: 2 December 2003; EU: 5 December 2003
- Genres: Action-adventure, platform
- Mode: Single-player

Prince of Persia: The Sands of Time is a 2003 action-adventure game developed by Ubisoft Montreal and published by Ubisoft. The game was released on the Game Boy Advance, PlayStation 2, GameCube, Xbox and Windows in November 2003. The Sands of Time is a reboot of the Prince of Persia series created by Jordan Mechner, who served as creative consultant, designer, and scenario writer for The Sands of Time.

The game follows an unnamed Prince whose father sacks an ancient city at the instigation of a traitorous Vizier. During the attack, the Prince obtains an artifact called the Dagger of Time, while his father's army captures an hourglass containing the mysterious Sands of Time. Visiting the palace of the Sultan of Azad to present the Sands as a gift, the Vizier tricks the Prince into releasing the Sands, transforming the people of Azad into savage monsters under his control. Together with Farah, a young Princess who knows the power of the Sands, the Prince works to correct his mistake and foil the Vizier's evil plans. The gameplay revolves around the Prince's platforming abilities, broken up by fights with the creatures created by the Sands. A key mechanic in the game is using the Dagger to rewind time if the Prince makes a mistake while platforming and use it to kill and freeze enemies.

Concept work began in spring of 2001, after Ubisoft acquired the Prince of Persia catalog. After Mechner was brought on board, production began in June of that year. After the initial story draft was scrapped as it was too complex, the team began with four guiding concepts, including the ability to rewind time: this idea grew into the Dagger, the Sands, and the various powers related to them. Mechner's script drew inspiration from the Shahnameh, with the main focus on creating a simple narrative that worked with the pace of gameplay. The game used Ubisoft's Jade engine, originally designed for Beyond Good & Evil, another game published by the company. Production was troubled, with the team facing problems with the engine structure and delays with environment assets, while also managing to create an effective tester network to seek out the game's bugs. In 2004, a version for mobile phones was developed and published in North America by Gameloft.

Upon release, The Sands of Time received critical acclaim, being nominated for and winning numerous awards, and has been recognized by many as one of the greatest video games ever made. Sales were initially slow, but it eventually became a commercial success. A sequel, Prince of Persia: Warrior Within, was released in December 2004. Further games set in the Sands of Time continuity have been developed, and Sands of Time is generally cited as the reason for the Prince of Persia series' return to fame. As of 2014, the game has sold over 14 million copies worldwide, across all platforms. After several years of development, a remake of the game was cancelled in 2026.

== Gameplay ==
The Prince in combat with Sands Monsters. Shown are the battle interface and the Dagger's available Sand chambers.

Prince of Persia: The Sands of Time is an action-adventure puzzle-platformer. The player controls the main protagonist, an unnamed Prince from a kingdom in Persia. Environments are seen through a controllable third-person view. The camera's view changes to different positions triggered by entering certain areas or performing actions. The Prince can be moved in all directions, and he is able to manipulate large objects such as blocks and levers connected to mechanisms. His health and power meter are represented in the top left-hand corner of the screen. The Prince restores health by drinking water from pools and fountains; total loss of health from injuries by traps or enemies results in a game over. Collecting Sands increases the Prince's power, and drinking from hidden magic fountains increases the Prince's maximum health. During several points in the game, the Prince is assisted by his companion Farah, controlled by artificial intelligence, who fires a bow at enemies, though her arrows can also hit the Prince if he strays into her line of fire. Monsters will attack her, and if she is killed, the game also ends.

During exploration, the Prince navigates areas filled with traps: these traps include spike pits, arrow traps, wall-mounted blades and saws, and spinning spiked stakes. The Prince's main contextual move is wall-running, an action where he runs up onto and along a wall for a set distance, either to land on or jump off to a platform. The Prince's other acrobatic abilities include climbing along and across ledges, walking along beams, swinging on and jumping from poles, jumping onto and between pillars, and swinging on ropes. Large environmental puzzles are encountered during the Prince's journey, extending across multiple areas in large rooms. Many puzzles are cooperative, requiring Farah's help to complete them. In combat, the Prince fights monsters created by the Sands infecting the Palace's inhabitants with dual wielded melee weapons, his sword and Dagger of Time, each controlled by a single button. With the sword, a single command contextually triggers different moves depending on position and directional movement, while other special moves such as a somersault attack and bouncing off walls into enemies require additional commands. After being damaged by the sword, enemies can only be killed by stabbing them with the Dagger of Time, which gathers up the Sands inside them.

The Sands the Prince collects from enemies and the environment are tied to his magical abilities, themselves connected with the Dagger. The most basic (and defensive) power is Rewind, the ability for the Prince to rewind time by up to ten seconds to reverse fatal game-ending mistakes such as missteps in platforming, getting overwhelmed by enemies or losing Farah. In combat, once the Dagger develops special power "tanks", the Prince can also use any of three more offensive Sand Powers that can slow time immediately around him, freeze time for a single enemy, or freeze time completely so that he can attack his enemies at great speed while they are unable to move. Each use of power uses up one Sand Tank, and when empty, all powers become inaccessible until more Sand is collected. More powerful abilities, such as freezing time, are powered by Power Tanks. Increasing their number unlocks new Sand-based powers. Starting out with a small amount of Sand available to him, its capacity can be increased by collecting Sand from enemies, along with Sand Clouds scattered around the palace. Large columns of Sand within the Palace grant visions of future areas and act as save points.

=== Portable versions ===
The Game Boy Advance version shares basic elements with its console counterparts. Displayed from a side-scrolling view, the Prince navigates the palace of Azad using his acrobatic skills. The Rewind ability is still present to save the Prince's life, and is also involved in solving some puzzles and fighting bosses. New moves and abilities are gained by the Prince by performing moves and solving puzzles. Farah is featured as a second playable character in some sections, with switching between the two being key to some puzzles. There are also light role-playing gameplay elements, such as debuff-inducing attacks, as well as combat statistics that can be enhanced by leveling up from saving citizens from the Sands' influence. The mobile version is similarly a side-scroller, featuring simple puzzles and traps. The powers linked to the Sands are absent, but enemies must still be killed by stabbing them with the Dagger. There are three enemy types: archers, flying enemies, and foot soldiers.

== Plot ==
In Persia during the 9th century AD, the Prince narrates to an unseen listener about his adventures. The Prince and the army of his father Shahraman are passing through India to visit the Sultan of Azad. The Vizier of a local Maharaja, wanting to prevent his death using a substance known as the Sands of Time, entices them into attacking the Maharaja's palace, where the Sands are stored. During the fight, the Prince loots an artifact called the Dagger of Time, and the Maharaja's daughter Farah is taken as a gift for the Sultan of Azad. Visiting Azad, the Vizier tricks the Prince into releasing the Sands, turning everyone but the Prince, the Vizier and Farah (protected by the Dagger, a staff and a medallion respectively) into monsters. The Vizier attempts to seize the Dagger from the Prince, but he escapes and eventually allies with Farah to undo the damage he has caused and prevent the Sands from covering the world, even though he has doubts about her loyalties and motives.

Throughout their journey, the Prince is forced to battle his own corrupted soldiers who have been transformed into sand monsters. His greatest emotional burden occurs when he discovers that his father, King Shahraman, has also been infected by the Sands. With a heavy heart, the Prince confronts his father and kills him to put an end to his suffering. Despite remaining deeply suspicious of Farah's true loyalty and motives, the Prince continues to cooperate with her to reverse the destruction.

Despite mistrusting each other, the Prince and Farah gradually fall in love. After navigating the palace of Azad and reaching the hourglass of the Sands in the Tower of Dawn, the Prince hesitates when following Farah's instructions on containing the Sands, unsure of whether to trust her as he has reoccurring visions of her stealing the Dagger from him. The Vizier ambushes them and they barely escape with the Dagger, ending up in a tomb beneath the city. As they try to find their way out of the tomb, Farah recounts a childhood story to the Prince that she has never told anyone else. Eventually finding shelter in a mysterious bathhouse, Farah seduces the Prince into the bath and they spend the night together. When the Prince wakes back in the palace, he realizes that Farah stole the Dagger while he was asleep and left the Prince her medallion to protect himself. He follows her and only just manages to catch her as she is driven over a ledge above the hourglass by monsters by grabbing the blade of the Dagger she holds, cutting his hand. To save the Prince, Farah releases the Dagger and allows herself to fall to her death. As the Prince mourns over her with the Dagger back in his wounded hands, the Vizier offers him eternal life in exchange for the weapon. The Prince refuses and stabs the hourglass with the Dagger.

Time rewinds to before the attack on the Maharaja's palace, and the Prince, still in possession of the Dagger and his memories, runs ahead to warn Farah of the Vizier's treachery. It is now revealed that the Prince has been recounting his tale to Farah, and as he finishes, the Vizier enters to kill him. The Prince kills the Vizier and returns the Dagger to Farah, who believes his narrative was just a story. The Prince kisses Farah but she rebukes him because she no longer has any memory of having fallen in love with him. The Prince rewinds time to undo his kiss. In parting, the Prince mentions a private word Farah told him during their time in the tomb, leaving her amazed and proving to her that what he had told her was indeed real.

== Development ==
The development of the initial concept work for The Sands of Time began in the second quarter of 2001, after Ubisoft had bought the Prince of Persia license. While Ubisoft held the Prince of Persia catalog, the actual IP still belonged to the series original creator Jordan Mechner, but he was initially unwilling to return to the series after poor experiences with Prince of Persia 3D. The game was developed by Ubisoft Montreal, which was also a year into developing Tom Clancy's Splinter Cell. After some mock assets had been created, Ubisoft asked Mechner to come and help develop the game, showing them their concepts and the assets as AVIs. Mechner was impressed by Ubisoft's work and came on board as a creative consultant. He soon became more involved with the project, becoming the game's designer and writer. Full production began in June 2001, and at its peak was worked on by a staff of 65 people, internally known as "PoP Team". Art director Raphael Lacoste noted that the crew was mostly young, including recent college graduates, with the overall mood being "try and make mistakes, and have a lot of fun creating this new IP." Development ran parallel to that of Splinter Cell, and as part of their research, the development team read One Thousand and One Nights, a collection of stories originating from the Middle East that Mechner had previously used as inspiration when designing the original Prince of Persia. Over the course of production, the team ran through over 150 different versions before the retail version.

The Sands of Time was announced in March 2003. It was released for the PlayStation 2, Xbox, GameCube, Game Boy Advance and Windows. The versions were released gradually between October and November the same year. The Game Boy Advance version of the game was released in North America on October 28 and in Europe on November 14. Scheduled for release in North America on November 11, the PlayStation 2 and Xbox versions were shipped to stores on November 6 and November 10, respectively. The PlayStation 2 version was released in Europe on November 21. The GameCube and Windows versions were released on November 18 and December 2, with the Windows version releasing three days later in Europe. The GameCube and Xbox versions were released in Europe the following year on February 20, 2004. The various versions had multiple differences in both graphics and control options. The GameCube and Xbox versions included a documentary about the making of the game. The PC port came with support for EAX, EAX2, and EAX3 Advanced HD. Gameloft developed a version of the game for mobile phones, which was released in April 2004. Two versions were developed for higher and lower-spec mobile phones. Connecting the GameCube and Game Boy Advance versions of the game gave access to a port of the original Prince of Persia with the GameCube version, along with the ability for the Prince to automatically regenerate health. The PS2 version was released in Japan on September 2, 2004. The game was published in the region by Sony Computer Entertainment Japan, who were impressed by both the quality and the praise it earned in the west.

=== Design ===
The game's title was thought up by the production team, but the original story built around the title proved impossible to work. The original draft had nine characters (including the Prince, two love interests, two villains, and two helper characters) representing different political factions, and the setting of the Prince's own palace home instead of in another kingdom. This storyline ultimately impeded other aspects of development, and so was scrapped. In starting over, the team returned to "The Sands of Time" title and concept. They decided upon four key elements for the game: "Unity of time and place", with the game taking place over twenty-four hours within the palace of Azad; "Acrobatics", referring to the gameplay and how the setting was constructed around this concept; "Combat", with the palace being filled with monsters to give the game and story a fast-paced feeling; and "Rewind", the ability to turn back and manipulate time. One of the early decisions made by the production team was not to refer to Prince of Persia 3D in any degree in designing the gameplay, instead looking to the 1989 original for reference. They intended to capture the original feeling of platforming an adventure in a 3D environment. The Rewind mechanic began as a gameplay wish for the title, surviving the initial rewrite of the story and becoming key to both story and gameplay. The Dagger of Time and the Sands were both born from the need to explain this mechanic in-game. The initial concept was simply using the Dagger to rewind time and dispatch enemies, but its powers were gradually expanded into its current roster. The main character's acrobatics were designed to be novel to the video game medium, inspired by similar stunts performed in Crouching Tiger, Hidden Dragon and The Matrix. A video game which provided inspiration for the acrobatic feats of the Prince was Tony Hawk's Pro Skater. Elements such as using ladders as part of combat, and riding on a magic carpet or a horse were axed early in development. The Rewind function was suggested by the game's director Patrice Désilets based on experiences playing Donald Duck: Goin' Quackers, where he had wished to rewind after making a mistake rather than restarting the entire level.

The game design was also influenced by Ico. According to Désilets, they "spent an entire day going through [Ico], the entire team together sitting down, looking at it, playing it, discussing it, brainstorming" and they particularly liked "how the castle in Ico seems real and you always know where you are, so we tried to have this a little bit also in the second palace". It also influenced the interaction between the player and the lead female character, but with some changes. According to Désilets, Farah "has some behaviors to help you out, but we didn't want for her to become a key just like in Ico, a key to a door all the time". Lacoste highlighted as an influence for the palace the animated film The King and the Mockingbird, which is set entirely in a single castle with floors stratified by rank with a king at the top, resulting in the desire for the Prince's journey to be a climb through the castle in levels that focused on verticality. The overall art direction tried to enhance the beauty of the Arabian Nights-inspired environments with blue-tinted lights and extensive set dressing.

Pre-production was originally estimated at ten months, but ultimately extended to fourteen months. Each time a new movement or ability was created for the Prince, it required adjustments to multiple other systems, as leaving them alone would have damaged the game. They also needed to make adjustments to the enemy and partner artificial intelligence, and they did not have time to polish those systems. All this meant that the debugging started much later than originally scheduled. The Prince had over 780 scripted movements, far more than any other character in the game. This caused problems with creating the movements for other characters. To make the character movements realistic, the team used motion capture to animate their movements. Art director Raphael Lacoste did not join the team until July 2002, well into the game's production, resulting in multiple delays in creating the game's environments. This issue was compounded by the need to produce a demo for the 2003 Electronic Entertainment Expo, then to deliver an entire game at the same if not a higher quality than the demo. Each environment needed to work for the Prince's set of movements and abilities: the work needed involved checking each rewind sequence, and each of the Prince's movement in and effect on the environment worked. These issues were compounded by the late delivery of environmental maps. In hindsight, producer Yannis Mallat lamented the fact that they did not have enough time to work out the problems caused by these issues. Despite these problems, other parts of production including play-testing, management of creative tools, and the integrated testing system worked smoothly. A cited example was the team discovering a tester that was good at finding severe bugs, so they included her in one of their testing groups, giving her a development kit she could use to sort out those bugs. This was replicated, and managed to greatly increase the amount of bugs that could be found and fixed. The development team's enthusiasm was also high, which enabled the problems during development to be overcome. During the aftermath of E3, the team considered release The Sands of Time as two games so they could include all the desired content, but the idea was dropped. Another element that needed to be cut after the demo was a griffin boss that would appear three times during the Prince's journey; such boss would appear in the Game Boy Advance version instead.

The game used an updated version of the company's Jade engine, designed for Beyond Good & Evil. When the team saw the capacities of the Jade engine, they decided to use it for The Sands of Time. For The Sands of Time, the team made improvements to the engine by adding additional walking and running animations, enabling smoother character movement. They also made custom animations for the character. The engine made editing and fine-tuning the game very easy due to its easy-to-use tools. Using this as a base, they were able to focus on rapid integration of new elements into the game, and were also able to do quick testing and adjustments. The team developed "substance" and "glow" systems, which respectively enabled natural movements of cloth and gave the lightning effects a "magical" feel. The way the engine was structured, with all assets in a single accessible folder, proved problematic when alterations needed to be made or new features added, as the team size meant too many people were accessing the engine and were causing data to be overwritten, files to be corrupted, and the whole system to crash. They attempted to solve the problem using a "data monkey" solution which would allow for simultaneous access, but it came late in development and they did not risk making such a radical change to the system. Instead, they set up a file server to manage check-in times, which could allow for management of access and prioritisation of critical work. Mallat stated that the team worked to have a "loading free experience" to not break immersion, even allowing players to downright skip saving points. To enable these seamless transitions regarding a technical restriction of the Jade engine, that was only be able to render one large room at a time, the rooms were separated by large S-shaped corridors, and as the player was halfway through the corridor the game would invisibly unload the previous room and load in the new one.

=== Writing ===
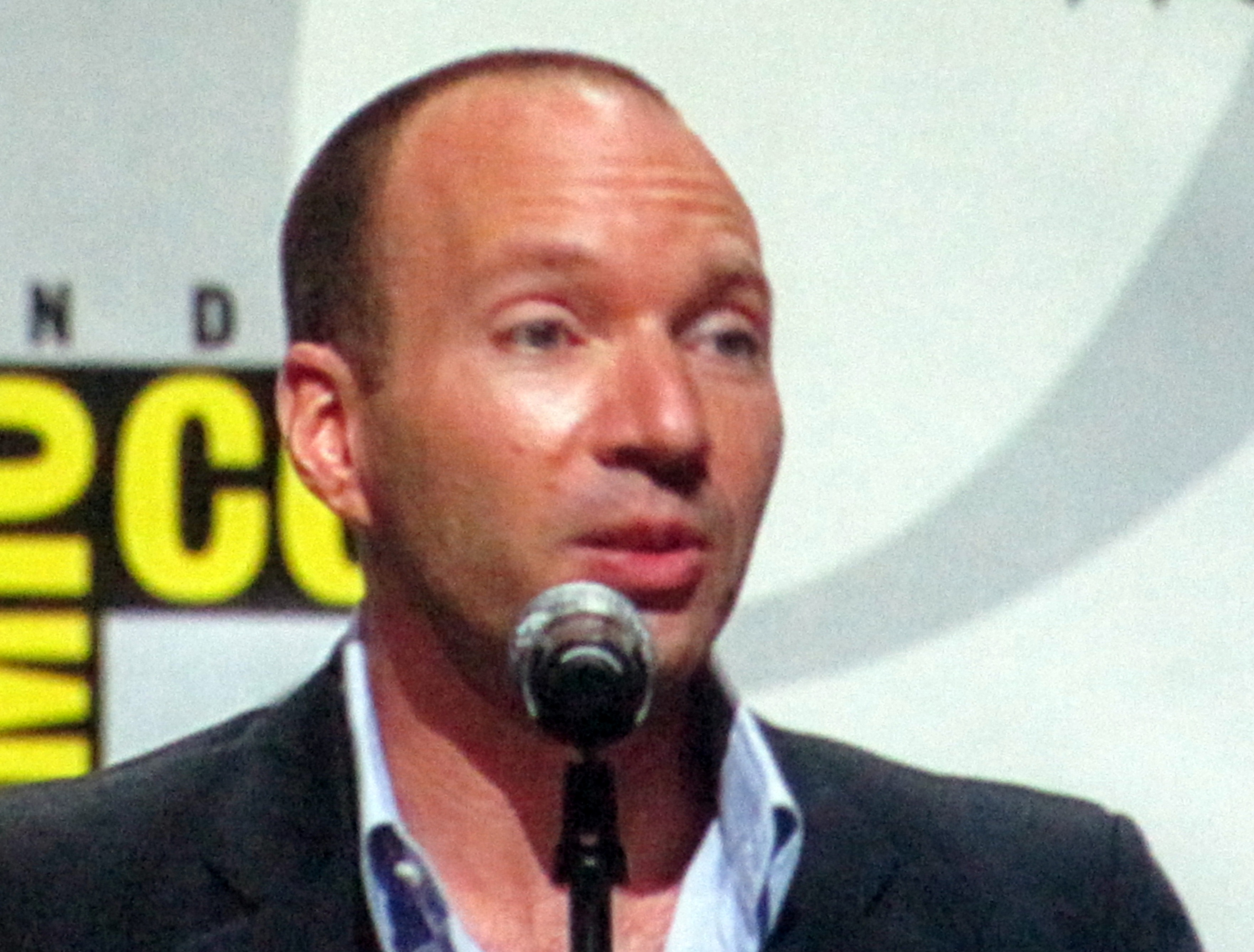
Jordan Mechner, scenario writer and game designer for The Sands of Time, at WonderCon 2010

Mechner created the scenario and wrote the game's script. While doing his research for the script, Mechner read a translation of the Shahnameh, an epic poem written by Ferdowsi between the 10th and 11th century. Reading it through helped Mechner visualise the new Prince as a more mature character than the original. Despite this, Mechner felt that the character could not fully shed the "happy-go-lucky" elements of One Thousand and One Nights. In retrospect, Mechner also felt that this inability to resolve this inherent conflict gave the character his charm. Mechner also included specific references in the Prince's dialogue to stories from the Shahnameh. Level designer Jean-Christophe Guyot noted that after the earlier versions of the plot had more fantasy elements, including a floating castle, once the game became more story-driven the resulting experience "was a little bit more mature, and with deeper meaning." The story and the Prince were created for newcomers to the series. The main scenario was based around second chances, while an unstated anti-war theme was also included by Mechner and showcased in the game's opening level. Mechner created the Dagger of Time as a combined gameplay and narrative device within the four core concepts created by the team. Its acquisition by the Prince was directly inspired by the opening of Raiders of the Lost Ark, which had previously inspired his portrayal of the Prince in the original Prince of Persia. The palace of Azad was crafted to be the Prince's "playground", while some scenes which developed the Prince's portrayal (the opening attack on the Maharaja's palace, activating Azad's traps on the instructions of a deranged guard) were deliberately meant to be morally dubious to the player while increasing empathy with the character. Mechner noted that the plot was "a disguised zombie horror story" where the Prince and Farah were the only survivors confined in a location where a plague turned everyone else into undead monsters.

Mechner's main preoccupation for this new storyline was keeping the narrative simple and engaging, using his preferred writing style of keeping cutscenes short and working as much of the story as possible into the gameplay. He also aimed to mix narrative and gameplay genres that might normally clash with one-another. The three main characters he created were the hero (the Prince), the villain (the Vizier) and the love interest and sidekick (Farah). Two non-playable authority figures (the Prince's father Shahraman and the Sultan of Azad) were included to add weight to the Prince's burden as they were transformed into monsters by the Sands. The three artefacts each character used (the Dagger, Farah's medallion and the Vizier's staff) were created to explain their survival of the Sands' release, with the Dagger also becoming integral to gameplay. The Prince's narration was both difficult and satisfying for Mechner. It needed to be written to work on two levels: first to be understandable for first-time players, and to gain greater significance upon future playthroughs. The narration also served to give gentle hints to the player, and expand upon the setting and add depth to the experience. Among his cited reference points for the narration were the 1940s version of The Thief of Bagdad, the works of Edgar Allan Poe, and films such as Double Indemnity and Sunset Boulevard. The Prince's interactions with Farah were also an important factor. As part of the character interaction, Farah was deliberately designed not to be a perfect archer, sometimes hitting the Prince if he strayed into her line of fire. Despite this, unspecified features planned for her needed to be cut.

=== Audio ===
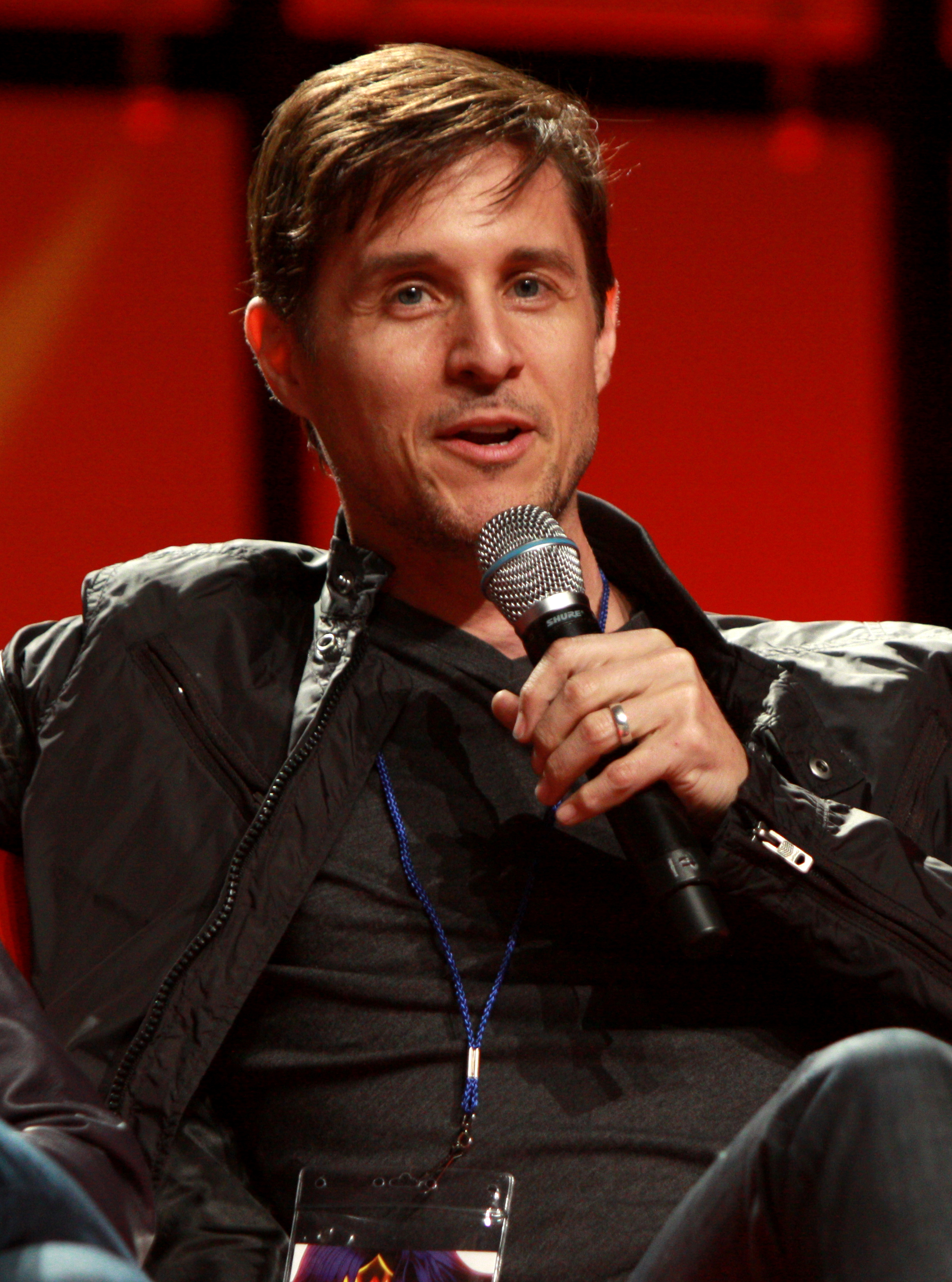
Yuri Lowenthal voiced the Prince in The Sands of Time, returning for subsequent games set within the continuity.

The music for The Sands of Time was composed by Stuart Chatwood of the Canadian rock band The Tea Party. Chatwood was chosen for the role as Ubisoft wanted music that had Persian elements in it to fit the setting, while not being pure Persian music. When he was approached, Chatwood expanded his music library as part of his research. To achieve the desired effect, rock elements were mixed with Middle Eastern music and melodies, along with Indian elements. Chatwood used different instruments, including an Indian tabla and strings, along with vocal tracks by Cindy Gomez and Maryem Tollar. A soundtrack album for the game, Prince of Persia: The Sands of Time Original Soundtrack, was released in Japan on 20 October 2004 by Scitron Digital Content. Tracks from the game were included in an album featuring music from both The Sands of Time and its two sequels Warrior Within and The Two Thrones. The album was released on 1 December 2005 as a pre-order bonus for the PS2 and Xbox versions of The Two Thrones. A larger compilation album featuring music from the three games was released digitally by Ubisoft on January 3, 2011.

For the sound effects, the team worked with sound company Dane Tracks to create most of the game's sound effects, with the rest being done by Ubisoft Montreal. To make the enemies in the game stand out, the sound team mixed "organic and evil" sound effects with whispering sounds, rather than using sound effects associated with the undead. Mechner supervised the game's voice recording. The recording took place at L. A. Vox and Ubisoft Montreal's sound studios. One of the unconventional choices made by the team was not to halt gameplay during in-game dialogue, meaning players could miss large portions of character interaction. In addition to story-based dialogue and banter, context-specific dialogue was written for certain situations. Over one thousand lines of dialogue were written, though over half of them were cut. To help with voice recording, the recording team created a graph to help the actors playing the Prince and Farah time their exchanges correctly. Aside from some exceptions which played in sequence, all comments made by Farah when the Prince did a specific thing were stand-alone responses.

The actors were chosen for their roles based on how well their voices matched the characters. The Prince was voiced by Yuri Lowenthal, whose performance was proven popular and would return to voice the character in future games set after The Sands of Time. Speaking in a 2008 interview, Lowenthal felt "that [he] in a way originated that role". Farah was voiced by Joanna Wasick. Lowenthal and Wasick recorded their dialogue in separate studios.

== Reception ==
=== Sales ===
By the end of 2003, sales of Prince of Persia: The Sands of Time had reached 2 million copies, and Ubisoft highlighted the game's success in Europe in a quarterly business report. Europe accounted for 1.1 million sales by February 2004; worldwide sales rose to 2.4 million units by the end of March. During its North American debut, the game suffered from poor sales: by December, the PS2 version had sold 218,000 copies, the Xbox version 128,000 copies, and the GameCube version 85,000 copies. Its combined sales since release at that time totaled 272,000 (PS2), 172,000 (Xbox), and 100,000 copies (GameCube). It was speculated that its sales were negatively affected by the concurrent release of Beyond Good & Evil, alongside other prominent releases at the time. In response to this, Ubisoft offered copies of their other games free with purchases of The Sands of Time, providing a boost to sales. By July 2006, the game's PlayStation 2 version alone had sold 700,000 copies in North America, bringing an estimated revenue of $24 million. During its week of release in Japan, the game reached seventh place in the charts, selling 14,000 copies. This was noted as being high for a western game released in Japan. By the end of 2004, it had sold 26,116 copies. It received a "Gold" sales award from the Entertainment and Leisure Software Publishers Association (ELSPA), indicating sales of at least 200,000 copies in the United Kingdom. As of 2014, the game has sold over 14 million copies worldwide, across all platforms.

=== Critical reviews ===
Reception

Aggregate score
Aggregator	Score				
Aggregator	GBA	GameCube	PC	PS2	Xbox
Metacritic	75/100	92/100	89/100	92/100	92/100

Review scores
Publication	Score				
Publication	GBA	GameCube	PC	PS2	Xbox
1Up.com	C+	A	A	A	A
Edge	9/10	9/10	9/10	9/10	9/10
Eurogamer	7/10	N/A	9/10	9/10	N/A
Famitsu	N/A	N/A	N/A	37/40	N/A
Game Informer	8.25/10	N/A	N/A	9.5/10	9.5/10
GamePro	4/5	N/A	N/A	5/5	N/A
GameSpot	7.1/10	N/A	8.9/10	9/10	9/10
GameSpy	3/5	4/5	4/5	4/5	4.5/5
IGN	7.1/10	9.6/10	8.8/10	9.6/10	9.6/10
Nintendo Power	4.5 of 5	4.3 of 5	N/A	N/A	N/A
Official U.S. PlayStation Magazine	N/A	N/A	N/A	5/5	N/A
Official Xbox Magazine (US)	N/A	N/A	N/A	N/A	9.4/10
PC Gamer (US)	N/A	N/A	79%	N/A	N/A

The Sands of Time received critical acclaim upon launch. Edge said that, despite difficulty spikes caused by respawning enemies, "the game cannot be commended highly enough". IGN's Matt Casamassina found the entire experience enjoyable, saying that "whether you're a diehard Prince of Persia fan or somebody with a mild interest in action-adventures, The Sands of Time is a must own -- a soon-to-be-classic worthy of a permanent place in your collection". 1UP.com, while pointing out the camera control as "tricky", said that the game "will make your chest explode if you've got a heart condition (in a good way, of course)". GameSpot's Greg Kasavin called it "a game that can be recommended wholeheartedly", and the publication named it the best game of November 2003 for GameCube, PlayStation 2 and Xbox. Both Eurogamer and Official PlayStation Magazine positively compared the game's aesthetics and presentation to Ico. Francesca Reyes of Official Xbox Magazine gave the game a good review, praising the story and general gameplay, but finding the combat difficult at times and lack of new skills. In closing, she praised the game's lasting appeal: "When the whole thing is over, it's perfectly timed to leave you wanting more. It's a stunning and rare achievement that makes you feel happy to be a gamer." Japanese gaming magazine Famitsu gave the PS2 version a good review, saying that the action was smooth and challenging, bearing similarities to the original Prince of Persia, and one reviewer found the Prince "colourful".

The PC version shared much of the console version's praise, but the controls and responsiveness of the camera caused criticism. The Game Boy Advance version garnered lower scores than the console and PC versions due to its scaled-down gameplay and presentation, but was still generally praised as a competent port of the game. Nintendo Power said that "acrobatic moves and inventive traps have never been as free-flowing as they are in [The Sands of Time]". Reviewing the mobile version, IGN reviewer Levi Buchanan was impressed by the company's adaptation of the console game's basic actions and atmosphere, giving it a score of 9.5 out of 10. 1UP.com reviewer Corey Padnos was pleased with the Prince's acrobatic performance and the game's general performance, while lamenting the lack of the time-based mechanics of the main games and the lack of plot.

At E3 2003, The Sands of Time was named as "Game of the Year". The game was named as Editor's Choice by GameSpot and IGN. At the 2003 Game Critics Awards, the game was awarded as "Best Action/Adventure Game". The Academy of Interactive Arts & Sciences, at its awards ceremony in 2004, recognized The Sands of Time with "Console Game of the Year", "Console Platform Action/Adventure Game of the Year", and "Computer Action/Adventure Game of the Year"; it was also awarded with "Outstanding Innovation in Computer Gaming", as well as outstanding achievement in "Animation", "Game Design", "Gameplay Engineering", and "Visual Engineering". At the 2004 Game Developers Choice Awards, the game won the "Excellence in Game Design" and "Excellence in Programming" awards; it was also nominated in the "Game of the Year" and "Excellence in Visual Arts" categories.

In 2009, Official Nintendo Magazine ranked it the 86th best game available on Nintendo platforms. The staff praised the developer's successful transition from 2D to 3D. IGN and Edge both named it among their 100 greatest games of all time in 2005 and 2007 respectively. Computer and Video Games placed it in its 2007 list of the 101 best PC games ever. In 2010, GamePro chose it as the 13th best PS2 game of all time.

== Legacy ==
The year after the game's release, the game was featured in an episode of How It's Made, in a segment dedicated to video game production. The game has been cited as the reason why the Prince of Persia series, formerly ignored after Prince of Persia 3D, returned to prominence in the gaming world. In 2004, Mechner began work on a film adaptation, produced by Jerry Bruckheimer. The film was eventually released in 2010. The success of the game prompted immediate development on a sequel, Prince of Persia: Warrior Within, with a darker aesthetic. It was released in December 2004. Several further sequels set in the continuity of The Sands of Time followed. Aspects of its design, such as the relationship between the Prince and Farah, later provided inspiration for the 2008 series reboot.

The Assassin's Creed series originated out of ideas for a sequel for Prince of Persia: The Sands of Time. Its critical and financial success led Ubisoft to request Ubisoft Montreal to develop a sequel, aiming for the next console generation. The Ubisoft Montreal team decided on taking the gameplay from The Sands of Time into an open world approach, taking advantage of the improved processing power to render larger spaces and crowds. Narratively, the team wanted to move away from the Prince simply being someone next in line for the throne but to have to work for it; combined with research into secret societies led them to focus on the Assassins, heavily borrowing from the novel Alamut. They developed a narrative where the player would control an Assassin that served as a bodyguard for a non-playable Prince, leading them to call this game Prince of Persia: Assassin. The "Animus" device allowed them to explain certain facets of gameplay, such as accounting when the player fails a mission, in the same way they had done in The Sands of Time.

=== Cancelled remake ===
A remake of the game, developed by Indian studios Ubisoft Mumbai and Ubisoft Pune, was announced at Ubisoft Forward 2020 and was originally scheduled for release on 21 January 2021, for Windows, PlayStation 4, and Xbox One. Lowenthal returned to voice the Prince, while Farah was voiced by Supinder Wraich. The announcement trailer drew criticism from fans who considered the game's graphics to be lackluster, particularly as it was being developed using the newest iteration of Ubisoft Anvil. Ubisoft responded by stating that the visual style was an intentional choice, as they had wanted it to be "unique ... to make this game standout from other games" due to its fantasy elements. The release of the game was initially delayed by Ubisoft to 18 March, before being postponed indefinitely to "deliver a remake that feels fresh while remaining faithful to the original". In its quarterly financial report of 2021, Ubisoft stated the game was expected to be out during its 2022–2023 fiscal year. By May 2022, Ubisoft Montreal was taking over development of the remake. A month later Ubisoft once again delayed the game, this time stating that the company was no longer targeting a release during its 2022–2023 fiscal year.

In November 2023, the official Prince of Persia social media account posted that "the project has passed an important internal milestone and development is progressing". At Ubisoft Forward in June 2024, Ubisoft announced that the remake would release in 2026 under the original title Prince of Persia: The Sands of Time. In January 2026, the remake was confirmed to have been one of several projects that had been cancelled at Ubisoft as part of a major company restructuring. In response to the cancellation, GOG.com created for their digital version of The Sands of Time workarounds around compatibility issues the original version has on more modern machines, as the old engine expected lower frame rates, clock speed, and a field of view in a 4:3 aspect radio.

=== OpenJade ===
23 years after the initial release; options like ambient occlusion or FSR were added

After the cancelled remake, OpenJade, an implementation of the Jade engine, was released by a GitHub user. This implementation allows the Prince of Persia trilogy to profit from modern features like fixing engine errors when playing above 60 FPS, Vulkan and DirectX9 rendering, handling multi monitor setups, several game controllers and resolutions above Full-HD with an aspect ratio of 16:9.
