= Corey May =

American video game writer

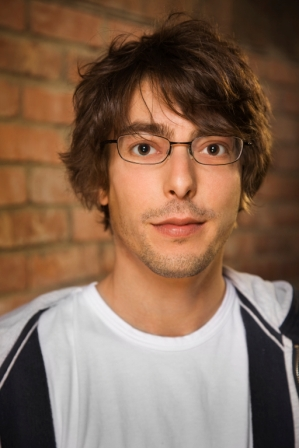
- Born: United States
- Education: Harvard University
- Occupations: Screenwriter, producer
- Years active: 2002–present

Corey May is an American video game writer. He is currently the Narrative Director for Austin video game developer Certain Affinity. May is also the co-founder and President of Sekretagent Productions, a production company based in Los Angeles, California working in the film, video game, and internet industries. May is the main writer of the Assassin's Creed series. May worked as the lead writer on Assassin's Creed, Assassin's Creed II, and Assassin's Creed III. Corey May also helped Jeffrey Yohalem as a writer on Assassin's Creed: Brotherhood, and Darby McDevitt on Assassin's Creed: Revelations. May helped Jeffrey Yohalem once again on Assassin's Creed Syndicate, making it the last game he worked on before departing from Ubisoft. May also helps in the production of most other entries into the Assassin's Creed franchise to make sure everything flows together into one coherent narrative.

May graduated from Harvard University in 1999 and founded Sekretagent with Dooma Wendschuh upon their graduation from the University of Southern California's Peter Stark Producing Program in 2001.

Along with Dooma Wendschuh, May has co-written for video games such as Prince of Persia: Warrior Within, Prince of Persia: The Two Thrones, Army of Two and Terminator Salvation. He also was an executive producer on the 2006 horror film The Plague, was a producer on the 2002 film Yo, Tyrone.

He and Wendschuh wrote the Batman video game developed by WB Games Montréal, Batman: Arkham Origins, a prequel to Rocksteady Studios Batman video games: Batman: Arkham Asylum, Batman: Arkham City and Batman: Arkham Knight.

== Biography ==
=== Early life ===
Corey May was raised near Hollywood. May's interest in films, comics, games and anime came from a young age. However, his family wanted him to initially attend Harvard University to become a doctor. May failed in Chem 5 and realized that medicine wasn't his future. May then decided to take BA and several English courses, including literature courses and creative writing courses. He took a class on Eastern European science fiction and read many books, but still intended to be an investment banker or a trader. In the summers, May took jobs at a variety of banks in New York City, but was rejected several times due to his appearance. However, he did receive a job to copy edit reports and journal articles.

=== Career ===
==== Sekretagent Productions ====
After college in early 2000s, May decided to apply to the Peter Stark Producing program at USC. At USC, May met his business partner, Dooma Wendschuh, and after graduation they made their production company official. They printed business cards and letterhead. Thanks to some contacts made during a Disney internship, the duo sold its first project to Disney: a re-envisioned live-action The Wind in the Willows. Many writers and directors including Guillermo del Toro have been attached.

==== Ubisoft (2004-2011) ====
Off the success of the first project, the duo signed with a film agency. The agency received many requests for writing on video games. Having loved the medium since childhood, May decided they should at least take the meetings, where he first met Ubisoft. May and Wendschuh pitched Ubisoft an animated television show based on Rayman. Despite rejecting the pitch, the executives did like May, and invited him to visit Montreal. After the critical success of Prince of Persia: The Sands of Time and Beyond Good & Evil, the publisher wanted May to help with the next Prince of Persia game, Prince of Persia: Warrior Within.

May then started working on Assassin's Creed for four years. "It was this big crazy weird super ambitious monstrosity. How are we going to go from what's in the creative director's head to what's on a disc? [...] As time went on I was more and more involved with the franchise, charting some of the aspects of its future. Not just writing on the games but overseeing the narrative elements of the brand as a whole," said May.

==== Alice (2011-Present) ====
[Alice] was an opportunity to step away from the day-to-day writing and get a broader view of narrative inside the studio and work ideally to address and provide a support system for concerns and issues I'd experienced while in production. So it's just taking the stuff I learned and experienced and trying to find a place I can share some of those lessons with the other writers at the studio. And perhaps most importantly function as an advocate for them. Because I oftentimes felt there was nowhere for me to turn during production, that there was no place I could go for help or guidance or if I wanted someone to take a look at my stuff or if I wanted feedback or advice. And so it's in some ways me trying to fill a need for something I wished I'd had.

— Corey May

Alice was originally formed in 2011 by Yves Jacquier, Ubisoft's director of production services. Alice's main goal was to improve stories in Ubisoft games. "It is a resource composed of talent scouts, motion capture masters, research and development engineers, sound mixers and narrative guides," reads a report from Alice.

The first game to see significant support from Alice was Watch Dogs. Michael Mando, who played Vaas in Far Cry 3, was also motion captured in Alice.

== Video games ==
Year	Title	Credited as		Notes
Year	Title	Writer	Producer	Notes
2002	Yo, Tyrone		Yes	Short film
2004	Prince of Persia: Warrior Within	Yes		
2005	Prince of Persia: The Two Thrones	Yes		
2005	Battles of Prince of Persia	Yes		
2005	Stolen	Yes		
2006	The Plague	Yes		Direct-to-video
2007	Assassin's Creed	Yes		
2008	Army of Two	Yes		
2009	Terminator Salvation	Yes		
2009	Assassin's Creed II	Yes		
2010	Assassin's Creed: Brotherhood	Yes		Story
2011	Assassin's Creed: Revelations	Yes		Story
2011	Happy Feet Two: Erik's Adventure	Yes		App
2012	Assassin's Creed III	Yes		
2012	Cartoon Universe	Yes		Online game
2012	Inversion	Yes		
2013	Assassin's Creed IV: Black Flag	Yes		Script consultant
2013	Batman: Arkham Origins	Yes		
2015	Assassin's Creed Syndicate	Yes		Story

== Awards and nominations ==
Year	Award	Award category	Title of work	Result
2010	British Academy Video Games Awards	Best Story (shared with Joshua Rubin and Jeffrey Yohalem)	Assassin's Creed II	Nominated
2010	Writers Guild of America Award	Outstanding Achievement in Videogame Writing (shared with Joshua Rubin and Jeffrey Yohalem)	Assassin's Creed II	Nominated
2011	Writers Guild of America Award	Outstanding Achievement in Videogame Writing (shared with Jeffrey Yohalem and Patrice Désilets)	Assassin's Creed: Brotherhood	Won
2014	Writers Guild of America Award	Outstanding Achievement in Videogame Writing (shared with Dooma Wendschuh and Ryan Galletta)	Batman: Arkham Origins	Nominated
