= Sekretagent Productions =

Los Angeles production company

Sekretagent was a production company based in Los Angeles, California, focused on providing content creation, screenwriting, development and production for both films and video games. Founded in 2001, the company has provided writing services for games such as Prince of Persia: The Two Thrones, Assassin's Creed, and Army of Two. Since 2009, the company has also been operating as an ad agency alternative providing creative marketing consulting and commercial production.

== History ==
The company was founded in 2001 by Dooma Wendschuh and Corey May upon their graduation from the University of Southern California's Peter Stark Producing program. Before graduation, Wendschuh and May sold their first screenplay, a re-imagining of the 1908 novel The Wind in the Willows. The two men established sekretagent using the funds from the sale, and began providing writing and development services to both film and game studios.

In 2009, the company received its first major job in the advertising world. The company was hired by William Morris Endeavor Agency to provide creative writing and production services to a dual web-based marketing campaign for Coca-Cola Zero and James Cameron's Avatar. The largest component of this project was a web commercial for Coca-Cola Zero set in the future titled "Coca-Cola Zero: Nanodisk". Sekretagent conceived the original concept behind the commercial and oversaw operations from development through post production. The commercial was featured on www.avtr.com.

The collaboration with Coca-Cola Zero led to a continued relationship between the two companies. In 2010, sekretagent was hired to produce the first ever 3D commercial for Coca-Cola. The company eventually produced two 3D spots, one of which was a joint effort with Coca-Cola Zero, Mentos, and Eepybird of YouTube fame. The spot garnered millions of views online, earning sekretagent and Eepybird a place in the viral video realm.

sekretagent Productions had two studios: the core studio, sekretagent, and its wholly owned subsidiary, Agent Sekret Productions, Inc. based in Montreal, Canada. The core studio dealt in content creation and production services in the marketing and advertising industry, as well as production of highly commercial "event" films, such as The Wind in the Willows (currently in development at Fox 2000). Agent Sekret Productions, Inc., founded in 2011, has become the headquarters for video game writing as well as development of original video game concepts. Agent Sekret worked in collaboration with Ubisoft Divertissements and Warner Brothers Games, both in Montreal.

A former subsidiary of sekretagent, S2 Filmed Entertainment, was dissolved in 2010 so that the company could focus more intently on larger films, video game development, and expanding its advertising reach. S2 Filmed Entertainment's first feature film, The Plague, was released in 2006.

== Filmography ==
=== Works Produced ===
- The Plague (2006) -- produced through S2 Filmed Entertainment

=== Works in Production (Sekretagent) ===
- The Wind in the Willows—set up with Fox 2000
- The Hunt—set up with Universal
- The Dogs of Babel—set up with Mandate Pictures and Heyday Films
- Below the Surface—set up with Ambush Entertainment

== Video games ==
- Prince of Persia: The Warrior Within (2004)
- Stolen (2005)
- Battles of Prince of Persia (2005)
- Prince of Persia: The Two Thrones (2005)
- Assassin's Creed (2007)
- Army of Two (2008)
- Assassin's Creed II (2009)
- Assassin's Creed: Brotherhood (2010)
- Assassin's Creed III (2012)
- Cartoon Universe (2012)
- Batman: Arkham Origins (2013)

== Awards and nominations ==
- Writers Guild of America, West - Winner: Best Video Game Writing 2011, Assassin's Creed: Brotherhood
- Writers Guild of America, West - Nominee: Best Video Game Writing 2010, Assassin's Creed II
- British Academy of Film and Television Arts Video Game Awards - Nominee: Best Game, Best Story 2009, Assassin's Creed II
