= Dahaka =

Dahaka has several meanings:

- Zahhak (Aži Dahāka), a dragon-king in Zoroastrian Persian mythology
- The Dahaka, an enemy in the Prince of Persia: Warrior Within video game.
- Dahaka, a boss in Final Fantasy XIII
- Azi Dahaka, a boss in Final Fantasy XI
- Dehaka, a primal zerg in StarCraft II: Heart of the Swarm
- Azhi Dehaaka, a void beast in Under Night In-Birth
