= Batman: Arkham Origins =

2013 video game

- Developer: WB Games Montréal (Note: Splash Damage developed the multiplayer mode, while the Windows port was outsourced to Iron Galaxy Studios.)
- Publisher: Warner Bros. Interactive Entertainment
- Directors: Eric Holmes; Benoit Richer
- Producer: Ben Mattes
- Designer: Pierre-Luc Foisy
- Programmer: Olivier Pomarez
- Artist: Jeremy Price
- Writers: Dooma Wendschuh; Ryan Galletta; Corey May
- Composers: Christopher Drake; Don Diablo
- Series: Batman: Arkham
- Engine: Unreal Engine 3
- Platforms: PlayStation 3; Wii U; Windows; Xbox 360
- Release: October 25, 2013 (Note: In some European countries, the retail Wii U and Windows versions were released on November 8, 2013.)
- Genre: Action-adventure
- Modes: Single-player, multiplayer

Batman: Arkham Origins is a 2013 action-adventure game developed by WB Games Montréal and published by Warner Bros. Interactive Entertainment. Based on the DC Comics superhero Batman, it is the follow-up to the 2011 video game Batman: Arkham City and is the third main installment in the Batman: Arkham series. Written by Dooma Wendschuh, Corey May, and Ryan Galletta, the game's main storyline is set eight years before 2009's Batman: Arkham Asylum and follows a younger, less-refined Batman. When a bounty is placed on him by crime lord Black Mask, drawing eight of the world's greatest assassins to Gotham City on Christmas Eve, Batman must bring Black Mask to justice, while also being hunted by the police and having to face other villains, such as the Joker and Anarky, who take advantage of the chaos to launch their nefarious schemes.

The game is played from a third-person perspective, focusing on Batman's combat and stealth abilities, detective skills, and gadgets for combat and exploration. Batman can freely move around the open world of Gotham City, interacting with characters and undertaking missions. Aside from the main story, Batman can help the police deal with crimes and confront other supervillains terrorizing the city. Arkham Origins introduces the ability for Batman to virtually recreate crimes, allowing him to investigate the scene and identify the culprit. The game is also the first in the series with a multiplayer mode, in which players partake in a gang war between the Joker and Bane.

Development of Arkham Origins began in 2011. WB Games Montréal took over development duties from the series creator Rocksteady Studios, which was preoccupied with Batman: Arkham Knight and thus would not have been able to release a new game for a considerable time. The team chose to make the game a prequel to explore certain aspects of the Batman character, such as his vulnerability and lack of experience, that previous games could not; the story was inspired by the comics Batman: Legends of the Dark Knight and Batman: Year One, and was developed with input from writer Geoff Johns. Development of the multiplayer mode was handled by the British studio Splash Damage, separately from the main game.

Arkham Origins was released worldwide on October 25, 2013, for the PlayStation 3, Wii U, Windows, and Xbox 360. The game received mostly positive reviews. It was praised for its voice acting, boss fights, storyline, and musical score, but was criticized for its general lack of innovation in gameplay mechanics and technical issues, while the multiplayer aspect was considered an unnecessary addition to the series.

A companion game, Batman: Arkham Origins Blackgate, was released alongside Arkham Origins for the Nintendo 3DS and PlayStation Vita, and a spin-off mobile game for iOS and Android platforms was released in October 2013. An animated sequel, Batman: Assault on Arkham, was released in 2014, while a successor, Batman: Arkham Knight, was released in June 2015. A direct sequel to Arkham Origins, Batman: Arkham Shadow, was released on the Meta Quest 3 on October 21, 2024, with Roger Craig Smith returning to voice Batman.

== Gameplay ==
Arkham Origins is an open world action-adventure game incorporating stealth game tactics. Batman can use his cape to glide around Gotham City and the grapnel gun's retracting rope to attach to hard-to-reach ledges and extend his flight. Some gadgets from previous Arkham games are present at the start of Arkham Origins, while others become available during play. Returning gadgets include the Cryptographic Sequencer, used to hack security consoles; the Batclaw, used for hooking onto surfaces; the Batarang, a throwing weapon; the Remote Batarang, its remote-controlled counterpart; Explosive Gel, used to destroy weak surfaces and knock down enemies; Smoke Pellets, used for stealthy exits and entrances; the Disruptor, which can remotely disable guns and explosive mines, and the Grapnel Accelerator, an earlier version of the Grapnel Boost. New equipment in Batman's arsenal include the Remote Claw; this allows Batman to target two objects and pull them together, allowing him to throw enemies into each other or hit them with objects (tethering two walled points creates a tightrope for Batman to cross); Shock Gloves, which allow Batman to block electric attacks, disable some enemies and stun shielded ones, and short-circuit objects, and the Concussion Detonator, capable of stunning large enemy groups.

The game introduces a fast travel system, allowing Batman to remotely summon his plane (the Batwing) to transport him to other areas of the game world quicker than gliding or grappling could. Enemy tower installations prevent Batman from summoning the craft in some areas and must be disabled to make the Batwing (not player-controlled) available. Some towers may be disabled only when the player has the necessary equipment.

Players can traverse enemy-controlled areas by stealth or combat. Using an enhanced version of the series' Freeflow combat system, combat introduces a tracking system assessing the players' efficiency and highlighting battle achievements (such as avoiding damage and using gadgets). Chaining attacks to maintain momentum, performance is rewarded with experience points. These points can be used in a branching upgrade system to enhance Batman's abilities and gadgets, allowing players to upgrade several paths or specialize in one. Enemy attacks are prompted with a warning icon, indicating that the attack can be countered. Enemies are armed with weapons such as knives, lead pipes, and shields. The game introduces new enemy types: the Martial-Artist (capable of blocking, evading, and countering Batman's attacks), the Armored Enforcer (invulnerable until he is dazed and de-armored) and Venom-infused henchmen (who possess superhuman strength, allowing them to grapple Batman and launch attacks which cannot be countered). Some enemies are armed with guns, which can damage Batman, and a player can use stealth predatory tactics to tilt the odds in their favor. Many areas feature stone gargoyles or high outcrops, helping Batman remain concealed while setting traps and knocking out enemies.

Arkham Origins introduces crime scene investigations; Batman can rewind and fast-forward through discovered elements of the case to uncover new clues. (0:30)

The game emphasizes Batman's detective skills; for example, he can scan a crime scene with Detective Vision (displayed in first-person perspective) to highlight points of interest; holograms act out theoretical scenarios of the crime. The crimes can be reviewed via Batman's link to the Batcomputer in the Batcave; this allows a player to view virtual recreations of the scene from different angles (with the ability to move back and forth through the crime's timeline), view it in slow motion or pause while looking for clues to solve the crime. Small (and large) crime scenes are distributed throughout Gotham City. Reviewing the downing of a helicopter, Batman is presented with false and accurate clues; investigation of the scene can reveal that the helicopter was shot, allowing Batman to trace the bullet's trajectory to a murdered police officer and another crime scene. When a crime is solved, the player is shown a Batman-narrated rundown of the crime. The Batcave is also a hub where Batman can change costumes, upgrade his equipment and access challenge maps to practice combat (these maps were accessed separately in previous games). After completing the story mode a New Game Plus mode is unlocked, enabling a player to replay the game with all their acquired gadgets, experience, and abilities; enemies are tougher, and the icon warning players of attack is disabled. Completing New Game Plus unlocks I Am the Night mode, where the game ends if Batman dies.

Arkham Origins offers side missions, including Crime in Progress (where Batman can assist the Gotham City Police Department (GCPD) by rescuing police officers from a gang or keeping an informant from being thrown to his death). Most Wanted allows Batman to pursue villains outside of the main story (such as Anarky, who plants bombs around the city). The Dark Knight system offers tasks of escalating difficulty which improve stealth and combat. Batman's radio scanner also allows him to locate side missions; completed missions are rewarded with experience points and upgrades to Batman's equipment. The game features collectible objects and puzzles similar to the Riddler challenges of previous games (orchestrated by Enigma before assuming his Riddler identity). Collectible objects appear, similar to those in previous games. A "1 vs. 100" mode in the game's challenge maps challenges the player to survive in combat against 100 increasingly difficult enemies.

On compatible systems, the Windows version uses Nvidia's PhysX software engine to produce more realistic, dynamic interactions with the game world. With PhysX enabled, some areas contain additional snow or fog (which reacts to Batman moving through it); with PhysX disabled, the effects are lessened or absent.

=== Multiplayer ===
Arkham Origins introduces a multiplayer component to the series. Invisible Predator Online revolves around a gang war between supervillains Joker and Bane, in one of four choosable maps voted by players before each match. The maps include: Wayne Chemical Plant, Blackgate Prison, Joker's Funhouse, and Wonder City Robot Factory. Three Joker gang members fight three Bane gang members and in turn the team of Batman and Robin. Gangs win by killing all the opposing team's reinforcements, while Batman and Robin win by acquiring intimidation points (from eliminating gang members). A gang member can become a boss (Joker or Bane), gaining more powerful abilities. Gang members can access guns and explosives; Batman and Robin can access gadgets and abilities from the main game, including Detective Vision. Gang members have a limited Enhanced Vision, which requires recharging. Hunter, Hunted sets three Joker thugs and three Bane thugs against Batman in a last-team-standing match in which each character has one life.

== Synopsis ==
=== Characters ===
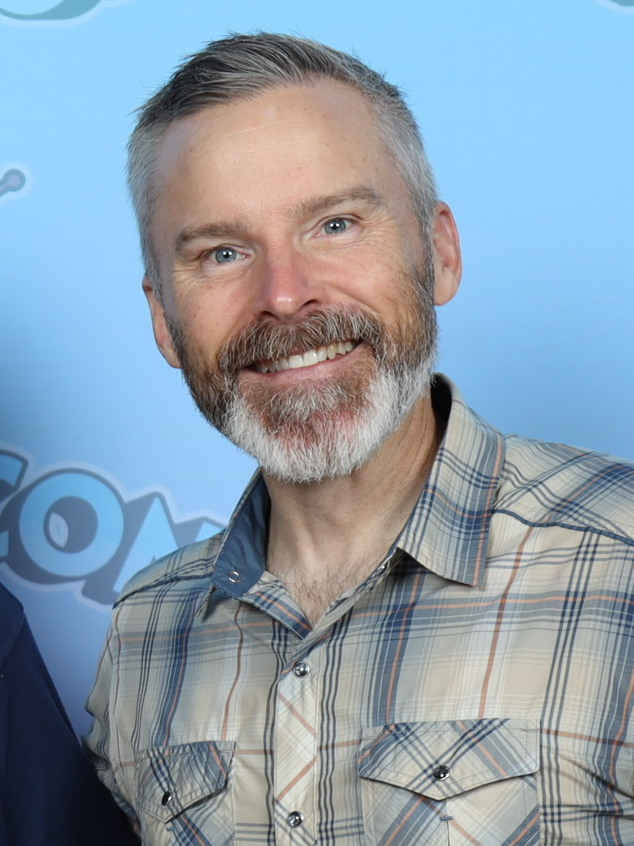
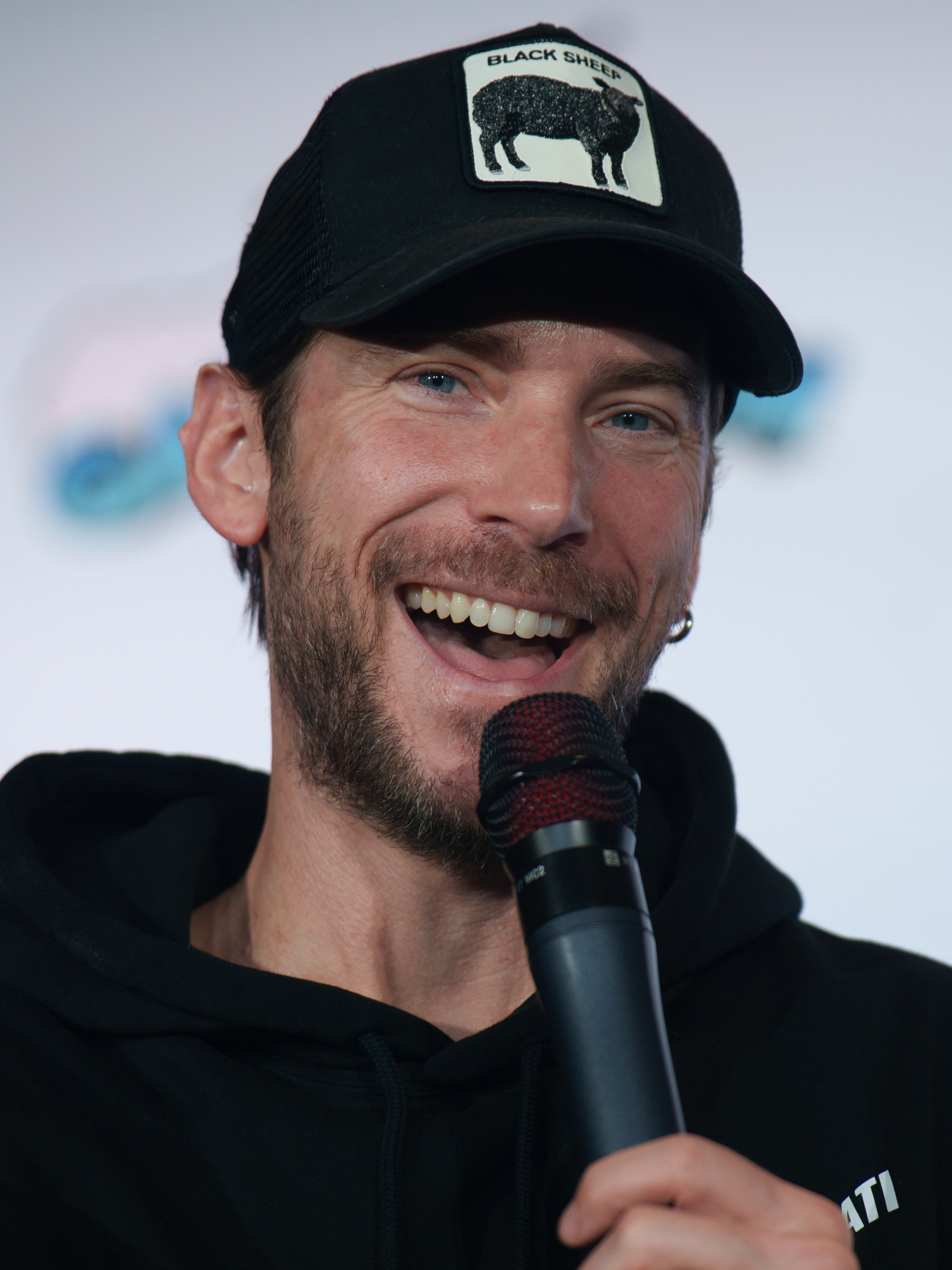
Roger Craig Smith and Troy Baker voice the younger versions of Batman and Joker in this game, replacing Kevin Conroy and Mark Hamill from the previous Arkham games.

Arkham Origins features a large ensemble cast of characters from the history of Batman comics. The main character is Batman (Roger Craig Smith), a superhero trained to the peak of human physical perfection and an expert in martial arts who is aided by his butler, Alfred Pennyworth (Martin Jarvis). Arkham Origins brings Batman into conflict with sadistic, brutal crime lord Black Mask (Brian Bloom). The most powerful man in the city and ruler of Gotham's criminal underworld, Black Mask has vast wealth and resources, has eliminated his opposition and is consolidating his power. His ebony mask conceals his identity, allowing him to operate publicly as Roman Sionis (head of Janus Cosmetics). Black Mask has a bounty on Batman, which attracts eight accomplished assassins: the physically imposing Bane (JB Blanc); expert marksman Deadshot; veteran mercenary Deathstroke (Mark Rolston); poisonous contortionist Copperhead (Rosa Salazar); the pyromaniac Firefly (Crispin Freeman); the highly charged Electrocutioner (Steve Blum); deformed criminal Killer Croc (Khary Payton), and master martial artist Shiva (Kelly Hu).

Batman is considered an outlaw by the Gotham City police, and is pursued by Captain James Gordon (Michael Gough), Detective Harvey Bullock (Robert Costanzo) and corrupt GCPD officials Commissioner Gillian B. Loeb and SWAT team leader Howard Branden. Other characters include the psychopathic Joker (Troy Baker); black-market weapons dealer Penguin (Nolan North); the mind-controlling Mad Hatter (Peter MacNicol); anti-government, anti-corporate anarchist Anarky (Matthew Mercer); rogue hacker Enigma (Wally Wingert); Alberto Falcone; Gordon's teenage daughter Barbara, and Blackgate warden Martin Joseph (Khary Payton). The story takes place before Batman's partnership with Robin (Josh Keaton)—although Robin is a playable character outside the main story—and before Barbara becomes Batman's ally, Oracle. Dr. Harleen Quinzel (Tara Strong), Gotham News Network (GNN) reporter Vicki Vale, Amanda Waller (CCH Pounder), Quincy Sharp (Tom Kane), and Calendar Man make cameo appearances in the game. Mr. Freeze (Maurice LaMarche) appears in the downloadable content, Cold, Cold Heart.

=== Setting ===
The events in Arkham Origins take place about eight years before Batman: Arkham Asylum, in midwinter Gotham City. Batman, an experienced crime-fighter in the second year of his career, is not yet the veteran superhero of Arkham Asylum and Arkham City. He is a mysterious force; even the police do not know whether he is a vigilante, a myth or a supernatural being. Batman has fought ordinary criminals and gangsters and is accustomed to being stronger and faster than his opponents. However, on a snowy Christmas Eve he is confronted with more dangerous foes: eight professional assassins hoping to collect a $50-million bounty placed on Batman's head by Black Mask. Villains (including the Joker) take advantage of the assassins' arrival to launch their schemes, and Black Mask's henchmen instigate a rise in crime and gang activity in the city.

The Gotham City Police Department is aware of "the Batman", and does not condone his approach to crime-fighting. Led by Commissioner Loeb, the GCPD is thoroughly corrupt; Branden and his SWAT team are hunting for Batman to claim the bounty for themselves. The incorruptible Captain James Gordon is one of the most unpopular members of the force. Batman's relationship with Alfred is strained; the butler, an overbearing parental figure, reminds him of his parents' deaths and Alfred sees Batman as a spoiled child squandering his inheritance on a vigilante crusade.

Old Gotham, the section of Gotham City which will become the Arkham City prison, is not yet walled off and has slums, low buildings, a shopping mall, and docks (where Penguin's ship the Final Offer is moored). On the Final Offer, Penguin has added a casino, a fighting pit, and a sales floor with weapons and ammunition. Across the bridge from Old Gotham is New Gotham, a modern metropolitan area filled with towering skyscrapers.

=== Plot ===
On Christmas Eve, Batman intervenes in a jailbreak at Blackgate Penitentiary led by Black Mask, who executes Police Commissioner Loeb before escaping. Left to battle the assassin Killer Croc, Batman prevails but learns Croc is only the first of eight killers drawn to Gotham by a $50 million bounty Black Mask has placed on him. Seeking Black Mask's whereabouts, Batman tracks the Penguin to his ship, where he defeats Deathstroke and Electrocutioner. Penguin reveals that Black Mask has allegedly been murdered at an apartment complex. Investigating, Batman discovers the victim was an impostor and that the crime involved a criminal known as the Joker.

To learn more, Batman infiltrates the GCPD to access its criminal database. While escaping, he encounters Captain James Gordon—who is distrustful of Batman—and a corrupt SWAT team eager to collect the bounty. With advice from Gordon's daughter Barbara, Batman accesses the sewers beneath the precinct to establish permanent database access, where he finds Black Mask's men planting explosives. Using the database, he deduces that Black Mask has been kidnapped by Joker, who is targeting the Gotham Merchants Bank. At the bank, Black Mask unmasks himself as the Joker, revealing he had assumed Sionis's identity days earlier to seize his empire and impose the bounty. Batman pursues him to the Sionis Steel Mill, where he frees the real Black Mask and defeats Copperhead.

Tracking the Joker to the Gotham Royal Hotel, Batman finds the building rigged with explosives, its staff murdered, and guests taken hostage. Joker mocks the assassins for failing to kill Batman, throwing Electrocutioner to his death. Batman claims his electric gloves and continues through the hotel. While most assassins depart, Bane remains, anticipating Batman will come to the Joker. On the rooftop, Batman battles Bane; worried for his safety, Alfred alerts the police so they will intervene. Bane flees by helicopter, firing a rocket that sends Joker plummeting from the roof. Batman rescues him, confounding Joker as to why Batman would save someone like him. Joker is arrested and placed in Blackgate under the care of Dr. Harleen Quinzel. There, Joker tells her that he and Batman were destined to meet.

In the Batcave, Alfred urges Bruce to abandon his crusade, fearing it will kill him, but Batman refuses. He also learns Bane has uncovered his identity as Bruce Wayne. Firefly's attack on Pioneers Bridge forces Batman and Gordon to work together to stop him. Meanwhile, Bane infiltrates the Batcave and nearly kills Alfred. Batman revives him with Electrocutioner's gloves, and Alfred admits Gotham needs Batman to face such threats. Elsewhere, Joker incites a riot and seizes control of Blackgate.

Realizing he needs allies, Batman joins Gordon and the police to retake the prison. Joker, strapped to an electric chair, presents Batman with a choice: kill Bane, or let Bane's heartbeat charge a device that will activate the chair and execute Joker. Batman stops Bane's heart with the electric gloves, satisfying Joker, who departs to detonate bombs across Gotham. Batman resuscitates Bane, who injects himself with TN-1, a steroid that transforms him into a hulking beast. After a brutal fight, Batman defeats him; the serum's side effects cause Bane to have amnesia, protecting Batman's identity. With Gordon's support, Batman locates Joker in the prison chapel. Joker, dismayed that Bane lives, tries to provoke Batman into killing him but is subdued instead. Batman leaves, and Gordon chooses not to pursue him, believing he is the hero Gotham needs.

In a radio interview during the credits, Quincy Sharp announces plans to lobby for Arkham Asylum's reopening. (Note: As depicted in the 2009 video game Batman: Arkham Asylum)

In the post-credits scene, Amanda Waller recruits Deathstroke into the Suicide Squad.

==== Cold, Cold Heart ====
On New Year's Eve at Wayne Manor, Ferris Boyle, owner of GothCorp, accepts a humanitarian award from the Wayne Foundation. The ceremony is interrupted by criminals working for the Penguin, led by a man in a mechanized suit armed with freezing weapons, who kidnaps Boyle. Wayne retreats to the Batcave, dons the Batsuit, and saves the guests, learning that the attacker is known as "Mr. Freeze" and is meeting weapons dealers in South Gotham. Investigating further, Batman discovers that the Penguin's men were receiving weapons manufactured by GothCorp.

At GothCorp, Batman finds Freeze and the Penguin in a standoff, with the latter holding Boyle hostage. Freeze encases the Penguin in ice and escapes with Boyle, leaving Batman unable to pursue because of an ice wall blocking his path. Interrogating the Penguin, Batman learns that Boyle possesses the access codes to a superweapon and that the only way through the ice wall is with a Cryodrill, which Penguin's men have stolen.

Equipping his XE suit, which allows him to survive extreme cold, Batman retrieves the Cryodrill and returns to GothCorp. There, he uncovers evidence of a past crime and learns Freeze's true identity: Victor Fries, a former GothCorp scientist who sought to cure his terminally ill wife Nora by placing her in cryogenic stasis. Boyle had financed Victor's research in exchange for weapons development but later reneged, stealing Nora's frozen body and causing the accident that forced Victor to live in sub-zero conditions inside a mechanized suit.

Armed with this knowledge, Batman confronts and subdues Freeze, but is then frozen by Boyle, who attempts to cover up his crimes by killing both Victor and Nora. Batman breaks free, defeats Boyle, and reactivates Nora's cryogenic chamber, preserving her life.

During the credits, the Gotham News Network reports on the resignation of Mayor Hamilton Hill and speculates on Gordon's potential promotion to commissioner. Vicki Vale reports on the arrests of Boyle and the Penguin while Mr. Freeze is being held in a special wing at the Gotham City Hospital. Sharp cites Freeze as further justification for reopening Arkham Asylum.

== Development ==
By July 2012, Warner Bros. Interactive Entertainment (WBIE) was planning Rocksteady Studios' next Batman game as a prequel based on the Silver Age of Comic Books, featuring Superman, Wonder Woman, Green Lantern, and the Flash. The game would explore Batman's first confrontation with the Joker, with a release date no earlier than 2014. In August 2012, Paul Dini said he would not be involved in writing a sequel to Arkham City. He did not write any of that game's downloadable content (including the story-based Harley Quinn's Revenge DLC) and said that Warner Bros. and Rocksteady suggested he accept other work if offered. Dini added that he had taken on other projects, preventing his involvement until 2013. In February 2013, it was reported that a new game in the Batman: Arkham franchise would be released by a developer other than Rocksteady.

The development of Batman: Arkham Origins began in late 2011 by Canadian development studio WB Games Montréal (WB Montréal), and the game was announced on April 9, 2013. WB Montréal was chosen to develop the game given the amount of time Rocksteady, developer of the first two Arkham games, needed to create Arkham Origins's successor, Batman: Arkham Knight, which would have resulted in "a long time without an Arkham game." WB Montréal had worked on the Wii U adaptation of Batman: Arkham City, familiarizing itself with the modified Unreal Engine 3 development engine used by Rocksteady. WB Montréal decided not to heavily modify the established combat system (believing it already worked well) but introduced new enemy types with opportunities for new tactics and combat moves to defeat opponents. The plot was partly inspired by the comic-book series Batman: Legends of the Dark Knight and the graphic novel Batman: Year One, detailing the first year of Batman's career, with Arkham Origins described as a "Year Two" story. Parts of the plot (such as Batman's relationships with the Joker, Gordon, and the game's Christmas setting) was partly inspired by Batman: The Man Who Laughs, Batman: Turning Points, and Batman: The Long Halloween, respectively. The story is written by Dooma Wendschuh, Ryan Galletta and Corey May, with input from DC Comics and comic-book writer Geoff Johns. Eric Holmes acted as Arkham Origins' creative director. Explaining the decision to develop a prequel, Holmes said while the Batman of Arkham Asylum and Arkham City is comparable to his comic counterpart—a fully formed, experienced character— Arkham Origins could explore other aspects of the character (such as his lack of experience and greater vulnerability). The game was considered 80 percent complete by January 2013, and WB Montréal used the remaining development time to tweak the final product.

By April 2013 the developers had decided not to use veteran Batman voice actor Kevin Conroy in the role, preferring a younger voice for Batman's early career. In May, Roger Craig Smith was announced as the voice of Batman and Troy Baker as the Joker. Conroy said at the 2013 Dallas Comic Con that he had been working on "the next Arkham", inspiring speculation that he would reprise his role as Batman in Arkham Origins; however, in June it was confirmed that Conroy would not be in the game. In July, it was announced that Arkham Origins would be the first game in the Arkham series to feature multiplayer gameplay. The multiplayer game was produced by independent British developer Splash Damage under creative director Alastair Cornish, separately from WB Montréal's work on the main game. The Wii U version of the game is single-player, with Warner Bros. saying that the team was focused on platforms with the largest multiplayer audience.

=== Design ===
Holmes described the Christmas setting as a juxtaposition between the joyful time of the year and the grim world of Gotham City, including decorative Santas near Gothic gargoyles and Christmas lights in dark alleys. The city is dislodged from time and space, contrasting 1930s (and older) buildings with Batman's futuristic technology. The New Gotham area was designed for vertical movement, allowing the placement of enemies above and below Batman to create areas dense with activity. The game features high contrast between darks and lights, with exaggerated shadows and few balancing colors. The city was divided into residential, industrial, and commercial neighborhoods, which were decorated accordingly: the industrial setting is bleak, the commercial area has corporate decorations and the residential neighborhoods have lights in their windows.

Designers aimed to make the younger Batman's outfit look "assembled versus manufactured", pieced together from several sources. Holmes said, "[Batman's suit is] not something that was made in a factory. He's taken pieces of tech either he's invented, he's fabricated, or things from the Wayne facilities, and he has made this costume out of these pieces." To emphasize the mystery and fear instilled by Batman in this early stage of his career, art director Jeremy Price and the design team used silhouettes and film noir-style low-key lighting to make the character more imposing. The name "Batman" is used sparingly in this game to emphasize his urban-legend status and the lack of understanding of the character. It was suggested that Batman occasionally make unavoidable mistakes during gameplay because of his inexperience (such as tripping or missing with batarangs), but this idea was discarded as inconsistent with the character. His inexperience was instead personality-based: learning how to be the city's protector and overcoming his obsession with vengeance. In designing Batman's abilities and gadgets, the gameplay took precedence over narrative consistency with the previous games; the designers thought that removing features players had already experienced in those games would make playing Arkham Origins feel less empowering.

Holmes acknowledged that Black Mask is not as well known as some of Batman's other villains (such as the Joker and Penguin), and the character required expansion to make him interesting and scary. Black Mask was considered an appropriate antagonist for Batman's early career because of his practicality; he transitions from the typical criminals Batman has been facing and the neurotic, quirky super-villains he will confront in the future. The team decided to make Arkham Origins' Copperhead a female (in contrast to the comic's male character) with input from Johns. The contortionist character required three motion-capture actors to animate: a stunt woman, a Cirque du Soleil performer, and a martial artist. This version of Copperhead was later added to DC Comics' The New 52. Anarky, an anti-villain based on anarchist philosophy, was updated in appearance for the game to a street protester with a gang resembling a social movement. The character would appeal to Batman for a partnership (since he is not necessarily evil) but, as Holmes said, "is multidimensional in the Batman Universe." The popularity of anti-corporate and anti-government protest movements factored in the character's inclusion, and Holmes thought that of all of the villains Anarky was the most timely. The developers drew upon "original Alan Grant and Norm Breyfogle appearances" of Anarky for his character. Each main-story boss reinforces the player's mastery of a specific game mechanic (such as Deathstroke, whose fighting focuses on countering attacks). The assassins selected for the game were chosen for abilities that would challenge the game mechanics. The boss fights were inspired by Arkham City's battle against Mr. Freeze, which tasked players with exploring the full range of Batman's strategies and abilities to overcome the villain.

The "Detective Vision" crime scenes were designed to be brief, visually rewarding, and fun segments, rather than demanding challenges. The designers worked on the length of time for each scene, seeing how many pieces of evidence players wanted to scan before they had a solution; they eventually settled on two to three minutes. Several predator areas (levels where Batman stalks enemies from the shadows) provide variety and challenge. For example, the theater aboard Penguin's ship was gradually shrunk in size to pack the enemies closer together, and a hovering drone was removed when test players easily overcame it. A dynamic weather system altering gameplay (such as wind and snow reducing visibility, making snipers more vulnerable to Batman's stealth) was implemented during development but discarded when it was not completed within the available development time.

=== Music ===
Christopher Drake — The Night Before Christmas
Drake was inspired by the 1988 action film Die Hard, using sleigh bells for punctuation.

The score for Arkham Origins was composed by Christopher Drake, replacing Ron Fish and Nick Arundel (who composed the scores for Arkham Asylum and Arkham City), with included an original song by Dutch DJ Don Diablo called ''Origins'', published by the famous music label Spinnin' Records. It was partially inspired by the 1988 action film Die Hard (also set during Christmas), which features sleigh bells in its soundtrack to punctuate specific moments. Drake said that since the game is a prequel, it allowed him more freedom in the score while adhering to "the DNA" of Batman music. He added that although the previous scores were elegant and orchestral, he chose more electronic elements. Drake approached the cinematic scenes like a traditional film score, with the design team describing scenes over the phone while he worked out of Burbank, California. The in-game music was created with layers that activate with action (such as Batman entering a location or beginning a fight) and can be added or subtracted depending on what is occurring. Drake hoped the in-game music would not be boring, since those sections work at differing lengths of time (dependent on how long a player takes to complete a task).

The Batman: Arkham Origins – Original Video Game Score was released by WaterTower Music on October 22, 2013, and features 32 tracks composed for the game.

== Release ==
Batman: Arkham Origins was released worldwide on October 25, 2013, for PlayStation 3, Wii U, Windows, and Xbox 360. A week before its scheduled release in Europe, the retail Wii U and Windows versions were delayed until November 8. A companion game, Batman: Arkham Origins Blackgate, was released with Arkham Origins for Nintendo 3DS and PlayStation Vita. A spin-off beat 'em up game, also entitled Batman: Arkham Origins, was developed by NetherRealm Studios for iOS and Android. The iOS version was released on October 16, 2013, and the Android version was scheduled for release in late 2013. NetherRealm Studios previously developed Batman: Arkham City Lockdown, a spin-off of Arkham City. The brawler game has players using touchscreen controls to fight enemies one-on-one (including villains such as Bane and Deathstroke). Defeating enemies earns points which can upgrade Batman's statistics or unlock gadgets and costumes; costumes unlocked in the game can unlock costumes in the console version and vice versa. In August 2017, the Xbox 360 version was made playable on Xbox One consoles through backward compatibility.

Coinciding with Arkham Origins' United Kingdom launch, voice actors Roger Craig Smith and Troy Baker made a public appearance at Stratford's GAME retailer. A series of game-character action figures and a working, life-size grapnel-gun replica were released in October 2013 by DC Collectibles and NECA, respectively. In December 2013, a digital comic book of the same name was released by digital studio Madefire with a prequel to the game. The comic is the first in DC Comics' DC^{2} Multiverse initiative, featuring dynamic artwork and sound and the ability to choose while reading how the story progresses (with several possible outcomes). Purchasing all eight chapters unlocks two costumes for the game.

=== Retail editions ===
The PlayStation 3 version of the game features the Knightfall DLC pack, with alternate Batman outfits based on the character's design in the 1960s TV series and Azrael's Batsuit from the "Knightfall" story arc (1993). The pack also contains five challenge maps (based on "Knightfall") which task Batman with defeating Bane and the inmates of Blackgate prison: "Azrael Does Not Protect", "City On Fire", "No Rest For The Wicked", "Venom Connection" and "Turning Point". The UK, Australian and New Zealand Collector's Edition contains a SteelBook game case and a 30-centimetre (12 in) statue of Batman and Joker. The North American "Collector's Edition" and the Australian and New Zealand "Definitive Edition" contain a light-up statue of the Joker by Project Triforce, a Batman "Wanted Poster", Batwing prototype schematic, Anarky logo stencil, glow-in-the-dark map of Gotham City and a Wayne family photo. The North American version also contains the 2013 DC Comics super-villain documentary, Necessary Evil. All regions also get an 80-page hardback art book, dossiers of the in-game assassins, the Deathstroke DLC and the "First Appearance" skin (based on Batman's first appearance in Detective Comics #27). The PlayStation 3 version also has the Knightfall content. Both editions were released for PlayStation 3 and Xbox 360.

=== Downloadable content ===
Deathstroke is available as a playable character for all the game's challenge maps, with weapons and abilities such as regenerating health and super strength, a rifle-staff with a built-in grapple, explosives, and his version of Detective Vision (Tactical Vision). The Deathstroke pack, available as a pre-order bonus, includes two alternate outfits based on costumes worn by the character in the 2013 video game Injustice: Gods Among Us and the 1984 storyline "Teen Titans: The Judas Contract", as well as two challenge maps, "No Money Down" and "100 to 1". Deathstroke is not playable in the main campaign.

The Black Mask Challenge pack, released in November 2013, contains two additional challenge maps: "Lot Full" and "Hidden Facility". Bruce Wayne is playable in the Initiation pack, released December 3, 2013. The pack contains five challenge maps, with narrative content to explain the setting. Initiation features Wayne before he becomes Batman, as he trains under his ninjutsu mentor Kirigi in a Korean monastery and comes into conflict with Lady Shiva. The DLC also contains two alternate skins for the character: Initiation Bruce Wayne (based on his monastery clothing) and Vigilante Bruce Wayne (a masked-ninja outfit). Also available in December was the "Hunter, Hunted" multiplayer mode. The story-based campaign expansion, Cold, Cold Heart was released on April 22, 2014. Set a week after the events of Arkham Origins, on New Year's Eve, Cold, Cold Heart's narrative focuses on the origin of the supervillain Mr. Freeze and features similarities to the Batman: The Animated Series episode, "Heart of Ice". The content introduces new equipment for Batman, including the XE suit which generates heat, allowing him to melt ice or throw thermal-charged batarangs. In January 2014, the Wii U version of the expansion was canceled by Warner Bros., who cited a lack of demand as the reason.

A number of alternate outfits for Batman and Robin were made available by completing in-game tasks and as downloadable content. Batman's skins include designs worn in the 1960s TV series, Batman: Noël, "DC One Million", "First Appearance”, Brightest Day, Gotham by Gaslight, "Knightfall", Injustice: Gods Among Us, Blackest Night, The New 52 (and a metallic variant), Red Son, Batman: Dark Knight of the Round Table, The Long Halloween, Earth-Two design (and its New 52 variant), and Thrillkiller. Additional skins include his appearances from Arkham City, Batman: The Animated Series, Batman: Earth One, Batman Incorporated, Batman: Year One, Batman: Year One, The Dark Knight Returns, Sinestro Corps suit, and Neal Adams' 1970s depiction of the character are available via multiplayer mode. Additionally, a suit, titled "Worst Nightmare" outfit, an original design based on how criminals perceive Batman, was going to be added into the game, but due to technical glitches, it was removed last minute. Robin's skins include Tim Drake's first and second Robin costumes, his Red Robin costume, the designs from Batman: The Animated Series and Arkham City and a slightly altered version of the default Arkham Origins costume.

== Reception ==
=== Pre-release ===
Batman: Arkham Origins was displayed at the 2013 Electronic Entertainment Expo (E3), and received two Game Critics Awards nominations: Best Action/Adventure Game and Best Console Game. It was also recognized at the expo for "Best Videogame" by Forbes; "Best Action Game" by Game Informer; "Best Comic Book-Related Game" by Newsarama and "Best Xbox 360 Game" by IGN.

=== Critical reception ===
Reception

Aggregate score
Aggregator	Score
Metacritic	76/100 (PS3); 74/100 (X360); 68/100 (WIIU); 74/100 (PC)

Review scores
Publication	Score
Destructoid	3.5/10
Eurogamer	7/10
Game Informer	8.5/10
GameSpot	6/10
IGN	7.8/10
PlayStation Official Magazine – UK	8/10
Official Xbox Magazine (UK)	9/10
Polygon	7/10
VideoGamer.com	8/10

Batman: Arkham Origins received "mixed or average" reviews from critics on all platforms except on PlayStation 3, which received "generally favorable" reviews, according to the review aggregator website Metacritic.

Arkham Origins was considered an incremental installment for the series, rather than a transformative one. GameSpot said that Arkham City expanded on Arkham Asylum by applying the game mechanics to a larger open-world setting, but criticized Arkham Origins for replicating Arkham City without moving the series forward. Other critics agreed, saying that the game's well-received elements from the previous game were not significantly developed or augmented and it was routine rather than inspired. However, other reviewers rated it on a par with Arkham City.

Critics cited Arkham Origins' handling of the genesis of Batman's relationships with his adversaries and allies and its question of whether Batman's presence enhances crime in Gotham City as the game's greatest assets. Scenes with the Joker received the most praise, with Polygon saying that although he was also a central antagonist in previous Arkham games, the story shone new light on the character; GameSpot called the story surprising in its exploration of the bond and similarities between Batman and the Joker. The story was criticized for lacking a cohesive narrative (particularly the opening plotline of assassins hunting Batman, largely forgotten by the game's end), but EGM said that when it works, the story was worthy of any Batman film, TV show or comic book.

The game world was well received for its number and variety of side missions and distractions but its scale was criticized as unnecessarily large, with GameSpot describing it as "bigger just for the sake of being bigger"; Joystiq described the city as unattractive, with the expanded play area increasing the commute but not the enjoyment. Others criticized changes in navigating the city; some areas prevented grappling, slowing (or stopping) travel. Polygon called the world more linear, with fewer chances to revisit areas with new gadgets to open new paths and deviation from the most obvious path necessary only to find collectibles. However, some reviewers considered the city's vastness and activities engrossing. Kotaku criticized the side quests as "busy work" for not advancing the narrative or providing appropriate rewards. Others found the use of previous elements tedious, with replacements, simply mimicking the old (such as the glue grenade, with an identical purpose to Arkham City's ice grenades).

Detective Mode, allowing the investigation of crimes, was not considered an improvement by Kotaku and GameSpot; while they considered it a good idea, its execution was minimal since a player simply looks for the next highlighted piece of evidence rather than solving a puzzle. Game Informer liked it, saying that they were complicated and showed how Batman analyzes a crime scene. The combat system received mixed reviews. The shock gloves were criticized as overpowered and making fights too easy, allowing Batman unblockable attacks (instantly disabling most opponents) and removing the need for tactics. Reviewers said that changes to combat punished more than challenged; greater enemy numbers and variety made sustaining an attack difficult, and (combined with an array of gadgets that hindered—rather than damaged—enemies) made encounters long and repetitive. Joystiq noted that the game emphasized combat over stealth. Kotaku called the combat rating system distracting screen clutter which broke the player's concentration, but GameFront said that the system was positive reinforcement for successful fights. The stealth sections were considered of similar quality to previous installments; their unchanged function left the methods of obtaining victory the same, making for a rote experience. The Remote Claw was criticized for making stealth sections too easy, allowing multiple enemies to be disabled without moving from the player's starting position.

Critics agreed that Arkham Origins' boss battles were one area of improvement over its predecessors; they offered dynamic, multiphase conflicts with their own stories. While not considering all equally fun or impressive, reviewers said that their variety and unpredictability provided excitement. Less-notable characters from the comics were considered less compelling than more-popular characters.

The multiplayer component was criticized, with Polygon calling it one of the least necessary multiplayer additions to a typically single-player experience. The gameplay was described as a mediocre shooter, incapable of supporting the necessary use of guns by its villains and with poor control of movement. GameSpot noted that poor weapon accuracy and movement controls made the thugs seem weak and inept while playing as the heroes lacked empowerment because of more restrictive combat ability and less resistance to damage. Other reviewers called the experience fun and hectic, but lacked sufficient depth to retain long-term interest.

The main voice cast was well received. Troy Baker was praised as the Joker, for his performance and as a worthy replacement for longtime previous voice actor Mark Hamill, but at the same time was criticized for his interpretation's replicating Hamill's. Dooma Wendschuh, Ryan Galletta, and Corey May were nominated for the Outstanding Achievement in Videogame Writing award by the Writers Guild of America. The game's cinematic content, under the direction of supervising sound editor Alain Larose, received a Golden Reel Award nomination for Best Sound Editing in Interactive Entertainment. The National Academy of Video Game Trade Reviewers nominated the game in three categories: Game, Franchise Action, Costume Design and Control Design, 3D. The 2013 BTVA Voice Acting Awards awarded the game in the category Best Male Vocal Performance in a Video Game In a Supporting Role (JB Blanc as Bane). The game also won in two categories (Best Visual Arts and Best Animation) at the 2013 Canadian Videogame Awards. The game was also nominated in the category "Use of a Licence or IP" at the Develop Awards. At the Xbox 360 Game Awards the game won in the category Favorite Villain (Black Mask). At the Kerrang! Awards 2014 the game was nominated as Best Video Game.

Reviewers described the Cold, Cold Heart DLC as better-paced and focused than the main game, owing to its shorter playtime that allowed for a more interesting experience. It was also criticized, however, for losing focus near the end, and padding the running time with unnecessary deviations. GameSpot said that the DLC featured a satisfying combination of the series' combat, stealth, and detective mechanics, and introduced interesting new enemy types that wield ice guns capable of freezing both Batman and other enemies. Reviewers described the story as entertaining, following the interesting character of Mr. Freeze, but considered it lacking in surprise because it replicates that of the 1992 Batman: The Animated Series episode "Heart of Ice". The final battle against Mr. Freeze was criticized for replicating several elements of the fight against the character in Arkham City. Similarly, IGN and Destructoid noted that the content lacked originality and innovation, providing generic environments and removing, rather than adding new abilities and weapons.

List of awards and nominations
Year	Award	Category	Recipient	Result	Ref.
2013	Game Critics Awards	Best Action/Adventure Game	Batman: Arkham Origins	Nominated	
2013	Game Critics Awards	Best Console Game	Batman: Arkham Origins	Nominated	
2013	Canadian Videogame Awards	Best Animation	Batman: Arkham Origins	Won	
2013	Canadian Videogame Awards	Best Visual Arts	Batman: Arkham Origins	Won	
2013	Canadian Videogame Awards	Game of the Year	Batman: Arkham Origins	Nominated	
2013	Canadian Videogame Awards	Best Console Game	Batman: Arkham Origins	Nominated	
2013	Canadian Videogame Awards	Best Audio	Batman: Arkham Origins	Nominated	
2013	Canadian Videogame Awards	Best Game Design	Batman: Arkham Origins	Nominated	
2013	Canadian Videogame Awards	Best Original Music	Batman: Arkham Origins	Nominated	
2013	Canadian Videogame Awards	Best Writing	Batman: Arkham Origins	Nominated	
2013	Canadian Videogame Awards	Fans' Choice Award	Batman: Arkham Origins	Nominated	
2014	Golden Trailer Awards	Best Videogame	Batman: Arkham Origins	Nominated	
2014	Golden Reel Award	Best Sound Editing - Computer Interactive Entertainment	Batman: Arkham Origins	Nominated	
2014	BTVA Video Game Voice Acting Award	Best Male Vocal Performance in a Video Game in a Supporting Role	JB Blanc as Bane	Won	
2014	BTVA Video Game Voice Acting Award	Best Male Lead Vocal Performance in a Video Game	Troy Baker as Joker	Nominated	
2014	BTVA Video Game Voice Acting Award	Best Vocal Ensemble in a Video Game	Batman: Arkham Origins	Nominated	
2014	NAVGTR Awards	Game, Franchise Action	Batman: Arkham Origins	Nominated	
2014	NAVGTR Awards	Costume Design	Batman: Arkham Origins	Nominated	
2014	NAVGTR Awards	Control Design, 3D	Batman: Arkham Origins	Nominated	
2014	Writers Guild of America Awards	Outstanding Achievement in Writing Videogame Writing	M. Dooma Wendschuh, Ryan Galletta, Corey May	Nominated	
2014	Develop Awards	Use of a Licence or IP	Batman: Arkham Origins	Nominated	
2014	Kerrang! Awards 2014	Best Video Game	Batman: Arkham Origins	Nominated	

=== Technical issues ===
After the game's launch, many issues on all platforms were noted by the media and players, including lagging; unending "falling" in the game world, preventing the completion of missions; no "continue" button on the startup screen, preventing a previous game from continuing, and some progression gameplay failing to unlock. On Windows, a bug prevented players from accessing one of Enigma's towers; on the Xbox 360, the save files were corrupted and unplayable, with crashing and freezing problems. On October 31, 2013, these issues were addressed by WB Montréal; in a community post, it said that the development team fixed many of the multi-platform problems and an update would be available by November 7. The company added that the Windows-specific issues were addressed in an update that went live on October 31, and the Xbox 360 issues were still under investigation. In February 2014, WB Montréal announced that they would not release any additional patches to fix any issues, due to the development team focusing on the upcoming single-player DLC. Any future patches would only address issues preventing progression in the game.

=== Sales ===
During its first week of sales in the United Kingdom Batman: Arkham Origins was the number-one-selling game in all available formats, topping the all-format chart. Its sales were half those of Arkham City during the same time, and approximately even with those of Arkham Asylum. It was the eleventh-best-selling boxed game of 2013 in the country. It was also the top-selling game on the digital-distribution platform Steam between October 20 and 26, 2013.

== Series continuation ==
Batman: Arkham Knight, the successor to Arkham Origins, was announced in March 2014. The game, which is a sequel to Arkham City, was once again developed by Rocksteady Studios for PlayStation 4, Windows, and Xbox One, and is set nine months after the events of Arkham City. An animated sequel, Batman: Assault on Arkham, was released on August 12, 2014. The film features the Suicide Squad, hinted at during the credits of Arkham Origins, attacking Arkham Asylum to recover information from the Riddler, but their plans go awry when the Joker escapes, and Batman is drawn to the facility.

On May 1, 2024, Batman: Arkham Shadow was announced to be releasing for the Meta Quest 3 in October 2024. The game serves as a direct sequel to Arkham Origins, taking place six months after its events, and according to director Ryan Payton, explores the aftermath of the Joker's Christmas Eve rampage while showcasing Batman's transition from a violent and vengeful vigilante into a symbol of hope.
