= Prince of Persia: The Forgotten Sands (Wii) =

2010 video game

- Developer: Ubisoft Quebec
- Publisher: Ubisoft
- Director: Mario Lord
- Producer: Valérie Hénaire
- Designers: Alexandre Pedneault; Yanick Piché
- Programmer: Marc Parenteau
- Artists: Thierry Dansereau; Steve Beaudoin
- Writers: Ben McCaw; Marianne Krawczyk
- Composer: Tom Salta
- Series: Prince of Persia
- Platform: Wii
- Release: NA: May 18, 2010; AU: May 20, 2010; EU: May 20, 2010; UK: May 21, 2010
- Genres: Action-adventure, platform
- Modes: Single-player, multiplayer

Prince of Persia: The Forgotten Sands is a 2010 action-adventure game developed by Ubisoft Quebec for the Wii. One of several related games of the same name, it forms part of the Prince of Persia franchise and is set between the events of The Sands of Time (2003) and Warrior Within (2004). Following the unnamed Prince as he is guided by the genie Zahra through a cursed kingdom, gameplay focuses on navigating platforming and combat challenges using both the Prince's acrobatic skills and unlocked magical powers. The game also features a form of co-op multiplayer with a second player using Zahra to aid the Prince with platforming and combat.

Production on The Forgotten Sands for Wii began in 2008 alongside its other versions and lasted two years, with Ubisoft Quebec being tasked with creating an original standalone title for the hardware. The game was built specifically for the Wii, incorporating motion control into the gameplay and working within its technical limits. The music, created by Tom Salta, focused on "eclectic" ambience over orchestra. Reception of the game was generally positive; critics praised its gameplay and graphic design, while faulting its combat as boring or impeded by its controls. Several journalists noted it as a good Prince of Persia and Wii game in its own right, and it saw award nominations for its writing and music.

== Gameplay ==
The Prince, center, jumps across a gap in a high stone walkway.

Like its other versions, Prince of Persia: The Forgotten Sands is an action-adventure puzzle-platform video games; the player takes control of an unnamed Prince navigating a ruined city set in Ancient Persia. The Prince is controlled using the Wii Remote and Nunchuck. Some environmental elements and later powers are triggered using the Wii Remote's pointer, while standard controls for jumping are mapped to buttons. While most areas use a free-roaming 3D camera, others use a locked 2D side-view perspective. Fountains scattered through the game act as checkpoints that restore health, and collectable sand orbs are scattered along the path which refill a meter which allows the Prince to respawn directly into the nearest safe area without restarting at a fountain.

As with other entries in the series, the Prince has access to acrobatic traversal options including wall runs and jumps, climbing on or swinging from poles, and scaling ledges. Areas are gated off with both platforming challenges and environmental puzzles or traps. After a point, the Prince gains access to three magical powers to help with navigation. These are a "spirit hook" which can be attached to walls and act as a temporary grip point; a whirlwind pillar to lift the Prince off the ground, and a sphere which allows the Prince to hover in mid-air and can protect him from traps. While early on these environmental elements are limited by position and must be remotely activated, later the Prince gains the ability to place hooks and pillars on any suitable surface and activate the sphere in mid-air.

Combat has the Prince attacking with his sword or fists and uses the system's motion controls; swinging the Wii Remote triggers sword attacks, while punching with the Nunchuck triggers a fist attack. Both controllers can also be shaken simultaneously to trigger a spin attack. Blocking is mapped to one of the controller buttons. There are a variety of enemy types ranging in strength and attack style. Occasionally, certain enemies in groups will have a blue aura surrounding them, meaning they are the "leader" of the group. If the player kills this leader, the other enemies will flee, and the player wins the fight. Enemies in combat can also be frozen by the player for a brief period of time. During boss battles, the player must pass a series of quick time events to finish phases of battle. Defeating enemies and breaking special chests around the environment grant experience points which unlock move upgrades and additional moves for the Prince.

The game features co-op multiplayer, with the second player taking on the role of the genie Zahra. Rather than taking direct part in gameplay, the second player can create platforming elements, and use their powers to slow down enemies and environmental hazards. Completing certain objectives within levels, such as fulfilling time trial requirements, unlocks special rewards similar to achievements. There are also gameplay-focused unlockables such as a survival mode against waves of enemies, challenge versions of platforming sections, and time trials.

== Plot ==
All versions of The Forgotten Sands focus on the adventures of the Prince, a son of the Persian king Sharaman. Chronologically, they are mostly set in between Prince of Persia: The Sands of Time and its sequel Warrior Within, and are intended to fill the seven-year gap between the two games and show how the Prince's outlook on the world changed. The Wii version is set at an unspecified point within that time period. A narrator tells of a story about the Prince, promising to reveal the true events of his journey to a lost kingdom under a genie's guidance.

The Prince is guided by the genie Zahra, whom he found and bought in a marketplace, through a jungle; Zahra has promised him a kingdom of his own, a princess as a bride, and immortality. Reaching a clearing, Zahra enters a statue and tells the Prince to kiss it; this action binds their spirits, granting the Prince immortality and the ability to see a secret passage to the lost kingdom of Izdahar. Izdahar, once a flourishing land, is now in ruin and in the grip of the Haoma, a sentient malicious plant which has killed or possessed the city's people. The Prince finds a sword driven into a statue, but pulling it out releases a being dubbed the Sorceress, who embodies the Haoma. Another creature dubbed the Beast attacks and the sword is broken, with its blade embedded in the Beast as it flees.

As the sword was keeping the Haoma confined to Izdahar, the Prince must now correct his mistake by retrieving the blade and reforging the sword to kill it. As they navigate the ruined city, the Prince and Zahra grow closer, with Zahra revealing she lived in the genie-built Izdahar and was driven out with her people when the Haoma took control. They eventually corner and kill the Beast, revealed to be Izdahar's possessed sultan Amir Rahman. Before dying, Amir Rahman asks the Prince to save his daughter Nasreen from the Haoma. The Sorceress also attempts to lure the Prince to her side with promises of power, but he rejects her. With help from godly powers within Izdahar, the Prince reforges the sword and confronts the Sorceress and the core of the Haoma.

The Sorceress is freed from the Haoma's possession and revealed to be Nasreen, who unwittingly brought the Haoma into Izdahar. The Haoma launches a final attack, and the Prince grants Nasreen his immortality with a kiss so she can survive as she is dragged into a chasm. He then flees with Zahra, but the sands are quickly consuming it. Zahra merges with the Prince to save him at the cost of her life, returning the Prince to the clearing to find Izdahar gone and the statue shattered. Nasreen, revealed to be the story's narrator, hopes she will meet the Prince once more as he walks away into the desert.

== Development ==
The Forgotten Sands began production at series developer and publisher Ubisoft prior to 2008, while development was ongoing on a series reboot. Beginning life as a video game tie-in with the movie adaptation of The Sands of Time, the film's delay prompted the game to be reworked as a return to the Sands of Time continuity. This approach allowed it to act as a counterpart to the 2008 reboot. The Forgotten Sands was also intended to win back players which had been "lost" to the God of War series, with the design focus being on narrative and artistic design. Rather than a single version across multiple platforms, different versions were made to play to each platform's strengths and weaknesses. The Wii version was developed by Ubisoft Quebec. The game is set in the seven year gap between The Sands of Time and Warrior Within, showing some of the hardships endured by the Prince which caused his personality shift in the latter game. Due to sharing a similar chronological setting, all versions of the game used the same title. Production on the Wii version lasted between two and three years, with a team of both series veterans and newcomers. At its peak, the production team was made up of seventy people. Mario Lord was director, Marc Parenteau was lead programmer, while the art director was Thierry Dansereau. The team as a whole was excited to work on the Prince of Persia license.

According to lead designer Yanick Piche, the game was designed "from the ground up" for the platform, optimising the technical elements to push the Wii hardware as much as they could. Scaleform GFx was licensed for the game's UI and animated textures, explained as allowing more complex-looking graphics without impacting the game's performance. To promote a smooth game experience, the Wii version was designed to run at 60 frames per second, and included small aesthetic elements that helped players find their way through the level. The control design, which made heavy use of the Wii Remote pointer, was chosen based on feedback from testers finding the flow of gameplay broken by needing to use the Wii Remote's D-pad. Co-op was included because of the Wii's reputation as a "social platform", compared by Piche to the style of co-op used in Super Mario Galaxy. Alongside recreating the established gameplay of the series, the team also added multiple options for traversing environments using the design mantra "create your own path". An optional fixed overhead camera was included as a homage to The Sands of Time. While motion controls were implemented, platforming made use of standard buttons as the team did not want to make the game exhausting for players.

The script and story were written by Ben McCaw and Marianne Krawczyk. McCaw worked with Lord and other members of the team when creating the story so it would fit the gameplay and setting. The goal was to show the Prince in pursuit of his own power, developing his relationship with Zahra along the way. One of McCaw's favorite elements was the mechanism for Zahra to grant the Prince powers by kissing statues possessed by her, and was referenced during the ending. The choice was made early in development to set all versions of The Forgotten Sands within the Sands of Time continuity, with its version of the lead character. It was designed that the Wii version should take place anywhere within the time gap, compared by McCaw to the story structure of the Arabian Nights. Yuri Lowenthal returned as the voice of the Prince.

The Forgotten Sands was announced by Ubisoft in November 2009. Versions for Nintendo consoles were announced the following month for a May 2010 release window, alongside confirmation of their differing content. The Wii version of The Forgotten Sands was released on May 18 in North America, May 20 in Australia and mainland Europe, and May 21 in the United Kingdom; it was released in parallel with its console and portable counterparts. The UK release coincided with the theatrical release of the movie adaptation of The Sands of Time. The Wii version also included a port of the original Prince of Persia as an unlockable. The port itself was made available for individual purchase on the Wii's Virtual Console service two years later.

=== Music ===
The composer was Tom Salta, who also worked on music for the PlayStation Portable and Nintendo DS versions of The Forgotten Sands. Salta was asked to send in a music demo as he had not worked on the series before. His approach to the music was to avoid "the typical "Hollywood" orchestral/ethnic blend", instead using an "eclectic" style focusing on immersion and ambience. The music made use of Asian and Near Eastern instruments including doumbek, kora, kanjira, mbira and duduk alongside custom-made instruments. It also had contributions from percussionist Bashiri Johnson, and contrasting vocal tracks by Azam Ali and Judith Bérard. A digital soundtrack album was released on May 18 alongside the game.

== Reception ==
Reception

Aggregate score
Aggregator	Score
Metacritic	77/100

Review scores
Publication	Score
1Up.com	C+
Eurogamer	7/10
Game Informer	8/10
GameSpot	7.5/10
GameTrailers	7.6/10
IGN	8/10
Nintendo Power	8/10
Official Nintendo Magazine	84%

Prince of Persia: The Forgotten Sands received "generally favorable reviews", scoring a 77 out of 100 on review aggregator Metacritic, based on 24 reviews. For their work on the game, McCaw and Krawczyk were nominated in the "Videogame Writing" category at the 63rd Writers Guild of America Awards. At the 2011 Game Audio Network Guild Awards, the music was nominated in the "Best Original Instrumental Song" category for the track "The Palace Gates", and the "Best Original Vocal Song – Pop" category for Zahra's theme.

IGN's Craig Harris was very positive about The Forgotten Sands, with his main complaints being some occasional inconsistencies with the controls and infrequent frame rate drops. Official Nintendo Magazine's Neil Long called the game a return to the well-liked Prince of Persia formula, citing its platforming and puzzles using the Prince's magical abilities as highlights. Justin Cheng of Nintendo Power similarly called The Forgotten Sands a return to form for the series on a Nintendo console, though he felt the use of sand powers and the combat were underdeveloped compared to the platforming. Ellie Gibson of Eurogamer was positive overall, citing it as a far more polished Wii game than others from popular franchises, with her main enjoyment coming from "making the Prince skip gracefully around well-designed levels, just like in the old days".

Tom McShea, writing for GameSpot, enjoyed his experience with the game and praised its overall design particularly in later more challenging sections, with his main faults being with the combat system and notable issues controlling the camera. Matt Miller of Game Informer found the Wii entry entertaining and enjoyable despite a slow start, feeling that Ubisoft had not promoted it enough as he felt it was a high-enough quality to stand on its own. GameTrailers felt it inferior to the earlier Sands of Time trilogy, but also better than many other titles on the Wii at that time, but still a high-quality game with good production values deserving of its place in the series. Bob Mackey of 1Up.com was less positive than many reviewers, finding the use of motion controls impacted his enjoyment of the game overall due to their impact on both the platforming at the combat.

Both Harris and McShae enjoyed the storyline and the interactions between Zahra and the Prince, while others felt it lackluster compared to other entries. The gameplay design saw general praise for its environmental and puzzle design, with it being positively compared to earlier entries in the Sands of Time continuity. (Note: 1UP.com, Eurogamer, Game Informer, GameSpot, IGN, Nintendo Power, Official Nintendo Magazine.) Both Cheng and Long noted the opening sections of the game as tedious due to a lack of variety in platforming and limited abilities. The combat was universally panned as boring or repetitive, with some also faulting the extensive use of motion controls in both combat and some platforming. The high number of extras and replay value was also praised. The graphics and animation, while occasionally noted for a lack of polish common to the Wii hardware, were lauded overall where mentioned as high quality for the platform and fitting the series aesthetic. The music was also praised, but the voice acting drew mixed responses with Lowenthal's performance being praised compared to other characters. Several critics noted this version as both a good addition to the Prince of Persia series, and a standout example of a high quality Wii title for a major game series.
