= Prince of Persia: The Forgotten Sands =

- Cover art for all versions and territories
- Developer: Ubisoft (Note: PS3, 360 and Windows version co-developed by Ubisoft Montreal and Ubisoft Singapore, PSP version by Ubisoft Quebec, DS version by Ubisoft Casablanca. Mobile version developed by Gameloft. Browser version co-developed by Ubisoft Montreal and Explosive Barrel.)
- Publisher: Ubisoft
- Directors: Jean-Christophe Guyot (Note: PS3, 360 or Windows only.); Mario Lord (Note: Wii, DS or PSP only.)
- Producers: Graeme Jennings; Joel Vignola; Abderrazzak El Kaouni
- Artist: Wilson Mui
- Writers: Ceri Young; Ben McCaw; Marianne Krawczyk
- Composers: Steve Jablonsky; Penka Kouneva; Tom Salta
- Series: Prince of Persia
- Engine: Anvil
- Platforms: Mobile; Nintendo DS; PlayStation 3; PlayStation Portable; Web browser; Xbox 360; Windows
- Release: May 11, 2010: Mobile, Browser; May 11, 2010; Xbox 360, PlayStation 3, Nintendo DS, PlayStation Portable; NA: May 18, 2010; AU: May 20, 2010; EU: May 20, 2010; UK: May 21, 2010; Windows; AU: June 3, 2010; EU: June 4, 2010; NA: June 8, 2010
- Genres: Action-adventure, hack and slash, platform
- Mode: Single-player

Prince of Persia: The Forgotten Sands refers to a group of 2010 action-adventure games developed and published by Ubisoft, with each version handled by different internal teams. The main version was developed for PlayStation 3, Xbox 360 and Windows; other versions were developed for Nintendo DS, PlayStation Portable, mobile and web browsers, and a notable version for the Wii. It forms part of the Prince of Persia series, and is set within the continuity of Prince of Persia: The Sands of Time (2003).

Chronologically, all versions of the game are set between The Sands of Time and Warrior Within (2004). The stories follow an unnamed Prince on adventures through the lands of ancient Persia, dealing with magical threats with the aid of different djinn. While gameplay varies across the different versions, they all revolve around platforming and puzzle solving, in addition to magical powers based around the manipulation of time or the elements.

Development of The Forgotten Sands began alongside the 2008 series reboot to correspond with the film adaptation of The Sands of Time. After the film was delayed, the game's concept was reworked to be in the same series rather than a direct tie-in. The different versions were developed by different Ubisoft divisions worldwide, with the Nintendo-based and PSP versions having unique stories and gameplay. The development team's main goal was a return to the series' traditional roots after the reboot's period of experimentation.

The Forgotten Sands received mixed to positive reviews for most platforms, with the PSP and DS versions faring the worst, and was generally seen as inferior to previous installments in the series. After its release, the Prince of Persia series went on hiatus for a decade, with no more major installments releasing until Prince of Persia: The Lost Crown in 2024.

== Gameplay ==
Gameplay from the console and Windows version; the Prince fights a group of sand warriors.

Prince of Persia: The Forgotten Sands is the name of multiple action-adventure puzzle-platform video games; in each the player takes control of an unnamed Prince navigating environments set in Ancient Persia. All versions incorporate platforming, magical powers often based on a form of time manipulation, and limited combat sequences.

In the main versions for PlayStation 3 (PS3), Xbox 360 (360) and Windows, the gameplay is equivalent to earlier entries in the Sands of Time continuity, with the Prince navigating 3D environments using a combination of standard acrobatics and magical abilities. Threats include enemies in arena-style encounters, and traps which must be navigated. The Prince's move set outside basic movement include climbing, a wall run to traverse gaps, wall jumping, balancing on beams, swinging from horizontal and climbing vertical poles. The game is set around a large palace complex, with a magical safe zone available at points through the story.

After a point in the game, the Prince gains access to different magical powers, the most basic of which is a limited-use "rewind" function which resets time if the player makes a mistake or the Prince takes damage. The powers are themed around the elements; the "Water" powers allow the freezing of water flows to make walls and poles for navigation, the "Earth" power restores destroyed elements of the environment, while Wind and Fire powers are used in combat as offensive spells. Combat has the Prince fighting groups of enemies, relying on dodging and rolling to avoid hits. Killing enemies grants a form of experience points, which can be used to upgrade existing abilities and statistics such as health, and unlock new powers. This version featured rewards unlocked with points through UPlay; these rewards included an experience point boosts and additional costumes based on both Prince of Persia characters and Ezio from the Assassin's Creed series. UPlay support ended for 360 and PS3 in 2017, and for Windows in 2021, locking off UPlay content.

The other versions have their own gameplay styles and settings. The PlayStation Portable (PSP) version is played from a 3D side-scrolling perspective, with the prince navigating environments from a horizontal or vertical perspective depending on the situation. The acrobatic elements are carried over directly from other versions, albeit restricted to the game's perspective. The Prince's magical abilities here revolve around manipulating the flow of time, allowing the environment to be sped up or slowed down. Time powers, and rewinds which reverse time if the Prince dies, are limited in number and replenished along with the Prince's health by drinking from a fountain. Combat sequences are triggered in some rooms, locking the Prince in until all enemies are defeated.

On the Nintendo DS (DS), which is again a side-scroller using 3D graphics, the Prince is controlled exclusively through the touch screen using the DS stylus. The rewind ability returns as a single power activated through an hourglass icon, able to slow down time so the Prince can navigate fast-moving obstacles or slow down enemies. This power can also revive the player. Use of the rewind is limited by changes of "sand", with the player reverting to their last checkpoint if the Prince dies without any uses of the rewind available. The mobile version is a side-scroller split into nine stages, with the prince having basic fighting abilities against standard enemies and boss characters, and a selection of time and elemental abilities drawn from the console game to help with navigation and combat. The web browser version is a side-scroller similar in design to the original Prince of Persia, while incorporating the rewind and elemental powers in addition to bosses drawn from the console game.

== Synopsis ==
Despite the stories differing between the different versions, they all focus on the adventures of the Prince, a son of the Persian king Sharaman. Chronologically, they are set in between Prince of Persia: The Sands of Time and its sequel Warrior Within, and are intended to fill the seven-year gap between the two games and show how the Prince's outlook on the world changed.

In the console and Windows version, the Prince is sent by his father Sharaman to learn leadership from his brother Malik at the ancient city of Rekem, finding the city under siege: the invaders seek Solomon's Army, a powerful supernatural force imprisoned with Rekem's palace. Malik releases Solomon's Army in the hopes of destroying the enemy army despite the Prince's warning, with the army turning on everyone. The brothers end up with half of the seal that kept the army at bay. Separated from Malik, Prince is drawn into a spiritual haven by Razia, queen of the Marid djinn: the army is led by Ratash, an Ifrit djinni who despised the alliance between humans and Djinn organized by Solomon and Razia to create Rekem. The two halves of the seal must be reunited for Ratash and the army to be stopped.

Despite attempting to reunite with Malik, they are continually separated by circumstance, and Malik begins falling under the army's influence as he absorbs the power of defeated enemies through his half of the seal; the Prince is shielded from the sands' corruption by Razia's powers. When they face Ratash, Malik seemingly kills Ratash only to be possessed by him, which destroys his half of the seal. Despite the Prince's wish to save Malik, Razia tells him that Malik can only be freed by killing him and Ratash. Razia is forced to transfer herself into a magical sword which can kill Ratash, as destroying one djinni requires another's power. The Prince succeeds in killing Ratash, fatally wounding his brother who dies in his arms. The Prince leaves the now-sleeping Razia in Rekem and goes to tell Sharaman of Malik's death.

The Wii version has the Prince and a djinni called Zahra explore a ruined kingdom while fighting a sentient plant which overtook it. In the PSP version, the Prince goes in search of the fire spirit Ahihud, who is killing royal princes to prevent a prophecy of his death. Allied with Helem, a spirit of time, he frees her sisters whom Ahihud' had been using as a power source. With the spirits' help, he fulfils the prophecy and kills Ahihud, bidding farewell to the spirits. In the DS version, the Prince is kidnapped by a cult whose master wants to use his blood and Razia's magic to become all powerful. An amnesiac Prince reunites with Razia to reclaim his memories and her power. They defeat the Master after he attacks the Prince's home of Babylon, but it costs Razia's life.

== Development ==
The Forgotten Sands began production at series developer and publisher Ubisoft prior to 2008, while production was ongoing on a series reboot. It began life as a video game tie-in with the film adaptation of The Sands of Time. After the film was delayed past its planned 2008 release date, the team wanted more time to make a better game, but Ubisoft's publishing side wanted the game as soon as possible. With this in mind, the concept was reworked as a return to the Sands of Time continuity, serving as both a reboot of the series and a return to a well-liked part of the series. This approach allowed it to act as a counterpart to the 2008 reboot. Both Level Design Director Michael McIntyre and Animation Director Jan-Erik Sjovall described the project as something aimed at older Prince of Persia fans. The Forgotten Sands was also intended to win back players which had been "lost" to the God of War series, with the design focus being on its narrative and artistic design.

The game was principally developed for PS3, 360, Windows, Wii, DS and PSP. Rather than a single version across all platforms, many of the versions were made to play to each platform's strengths and weaknesses. Further versions were developed for mobile and web browser. Each version of The Forgotten Sands was developed by different Ubisoft studios. The game is set in the seven year gap between The Sands of Time and Warrior Within, showing some of the hardships endured by the Prince which caused his personality shift in the latter game. A recurring narrative theme across versions was the growth of the Prince into someone who would take responsibility as a leader. Due to sharing a similar chronological setting, all versions of the game used the same title.

The choice was made early in development to set The Forgotten Sands within the Sands of Time continuity, with its version of the lead character. Yuri Lowenthal returned as the voice of the Prince across all versions with voice acting. Lowenthal found returning to the role "exhilarating and terrifying" due both to his liking for the role and fan expectations for the character. His portrayal was influenced by the Prince's story portrayal as transition from his incarnations in Sands of Time and Warrior Within. The lead composer for the music was Steve Jablonsky, known as a composer for the Gears of War series. Another contributor to the score was Penka Kouneva. The music was written as "orchestral with Persian elements". Kouneva created two hours of in-game music, considering it one of her best projects. The Wii, PSP and DS soundtracks were composed by Tom Salta. Salta was asked to send in a music demo as he had not worked on the series before. His approach to the music was to avoid "the typical "Hollywood" orchestral/ethnic blend", instead using an "eclectic" style focusing on immersion and ambience. The home console and Wii versions both received digital soundtrack albums on May 18.

The game was first hinted when a trademark was registered for the title by series creator and IP owner Jordan Mechner. The Forgotten Sands was announced by Ubisoft in November 2009. The mobile and web browser versions were released on May 11. The console and portable versions were released on May 18 in North America, May 20 in Australia and mainland Europe, and May 21 in the United Kingdom. A PS3 and 360 limited collector's edition was produced, featuring a disc of extras and a free copy of Prince of Persia Classic. The 360 version was made backward compatible with the Xbox One in June 2019. The Windows version was delayed into the following month so it could be optimised for performance on a wide range of machines. It was eventually released on June 3 in Australia, June 4 in Europe, and June 8 in North America. The Windows collector's edition included in-game items, a soundtrack disc and a free download copy of The Sands of Time. Pre-orders of either Windows edition also included with a free download copy of Warrior Within. The Windows version was also a launch title for the OnLive service on June 17. Ubisoft published the PS3, 360 and PSP version in Japan on June 26.

=== Versions ===
The PS3, 360 and Windows versions were co-developed by Ubisoft Montreal and Ubisoft Singapore. These three versions shared the same story and gameplay. The development team included between fifty and sixty people. When developing this version, the team approached it as if they were making the original Sands of Time for modern hardware, refining the established gameplay while introducing new elements through the powers of the djinn. Due to the relatively small size of the production team, there was no AI-controlled companion created for the Prince as it would have been too much work. The art design was described as "Arabian Nights-inspired realism". The Prince's art design was based on his appearance in Warrior Within as the "better-looking" version of the character. According to lead programmer Alain Dessureaux, the team implemented "interesting" graphical effects which could function without slowing the frame rate. The CGI opening was produced by Digic Pictures.

The game used Anvil, an in-house game engine used for both the 2008 reboot and the Assassin's Creed series. The engine was optimised to support crowds of up to fifty enemies at once in combat, with processor usage scaling between two and six cores to allow for less powerful gaming set-ups to run it. The console and Windows versions used Havok for the physics engine, allowing for a large number of breakable environmental objects. Advanced ragdoll physics were implemented to allow for the use of melee pushes during combat. The Windows version also included AMD Eyefinity allowing for multi-screen display.

The script was written by Ceri Young. Young referenced the original Sands of Time trilogy when writing the Prince as a transitional character, not as arrogant as his original appearance and wary of magic but still shy of responsibility. The story drew inspiration from One Thousand and One Nights, Tales of the Alhambra, and elements of Persian mythology. Razia's name was a reference to Razia al-Din, a 13th Century ruler of the Delhi Sultanate. Malik's name was chosen as it was a common name meaning "king". Compared to the 2008 reboot, which was criticised for being too easy, the team focused on making The Forgotten Sands challenging without being too difficult. The controls were also made less automatic. The combat system was designed around a philosophy of high movement and acrobatic elements, with a lack of defensive elements. It also focused on crowd control of enemies over one-on-one fights, inspired by the Prince's portrayal as skilled with the sword. Emulating the earlier variety of the Sands of Time trilogy, enemy types were given specific attacks and weaknesses for players to memorise.

The other versions of The Forgotten Sands each had their own gameplay and narrative. The Wii and PSP versions were developed by Ubisoft Quebec. Production on the Wii version lasted between two and three years, with a team of both series veterans and newcomers. The storyline was written by Ben McCaw and Marianne Krawczyk. Alongside recreating the established gameplay of the series, the team also added multiple options for traversing environments using the design mantra "create your own path". The PSP team was made up of veteran Ubisoft developers who had worked on projects across multiple genres. According to producer Joel Vignola, the game was designed to appeal to both "hardcore" and "casual" gamers, alongside being a portable version of established Prince of Persia gameplay designed specifically for the platform. Due to the Prince's solitary adventure, multiplayer was not included in this version. A focus was placed in keeping a high and stable frame rate. The script was again written by McCaw and Krawczyk.

The DS version was developed by Ubisoft Casablanca. Production on the DS version lasted approximately one year. Ubisoft Casablanca had previously worked on The Two Thrones, and multiple portable games including the Rabbids series. The team included both new staff and returning staff from Prince of Persia: The Fallen King. McCaw acted as narrative director. The mobile version, which adapted the main console version into a mobile scenario with dedicated gameplay, was developed and published by Gameloft, which had developed multiple mobile versions of the Prince of Persia series. The browser version, created to help promote the main console version and again inspired by the main console version, was co-developed by Ubisoft Montreal and indie browser developer Explosive Barrel.

== Reception ==
Reception

Aggregate scores
Aggregator	Score
GameRankings	(PC) 78.22% (X360) 75.52% (PS3) 74.82% (PSP) 61.75% (DS) 57.33%
Metacritic	(PC) 75/100 (PS3) 75/100 (X360) 74/100 (PSP) 65/100 (DS) 57/100

Review scores
Publication	Score
Destructoid	8.5/10
Edge	6/10
Eurogamer	6/10
Game Informer	8/10
GamePro	4.5/5
GameRevolution	B−
GameSpot	7.5/10 (PSP) 6.5/10
GameTrailers	7.8/10
GameZone	6/10
Giant Bomb	3/5
IGN	8/10 (PSP) 6/10 (DS) 4.5/10
Joystiq	3/5
Nintendo Power	8/10
Official Nintendo Magazine	66%
Official Xbox Magazine (US)	7.5/10
The A.V. Club	B
The Daily Telegraph	7/10

The game was met with generally positive reviews upon release. GameRankings and Metacritic gave it a score of 57.33% and 57 out of 100 for the DS version; 74.82% and 75 out of 100 for the PlayStation 3 version; 61.75% and 65 out of 100 for the PSP version; 75.52% and 74 out of 100 for the Xbox 360 version; 76.53% and 77 out of 100 for the Wii version; and 78.22% and 75 out of 100 for the PC version.
