= Prince of Persia: Warrior Within =

2004 video game

- North American cover art
- Developer: Ubisoft Montreal (Note: PSP version developed by Pipeworks Software.)
- Publisher: Ubisoft (Note: J2ME and iOS port published by Gameloft.)
- Director: Jean-Christophe Guyot
- Producer: Bertrand Hélias
- Designer: Kevin Guillemette
- Programmer: Régis Geoffrion
- Writers: Corey May; Dooma Wendschuh
- Composers: Stuart Chatwood; Inon Zur
- Series: Prince of Persia
- Engine: Jade
- Platforms: GameCube; PlayStation 2; Windows; Xbox; Mobile phone; PlayStation Portable; BlackBerry; iOS
- Release: December 2, 2004: GameCube, PlayStation 2, Windows, Xbox, mobile; NA: December 2, 2004; EU: December 3, 2004 PlayStation Portable; NA: December 6, 2005; EU: December 16, 2005 BlackBerry; NA: March 2006 iOS; WW: June 3, 2010
- Genres: Action-adventure, platform, hack and slash
- Mode: Single-player

Prince of Persia: Warrior Within is a 2004 action-adventure game developed and published by Ubisoft for GameCube, Microsoft Windows, PlayStation 2, and Xbox. It is the fifth main installment in the Prince of Persia series, and the sequel to 2003's Prince of Persia: The Sands of Time. A port for the PlayStation Portable developed by Pipeworks Software, titled Prince of Persia: Revelations, was released in 2005. Two mobile versions of Warrior Within were published by Gameloft for J2ME and iOS in 2004 and 2010, respectively. Due to issues with the in-game menu, the iOS version was temporarily pulled from the App Store for two weeks.

Set seven years after its predecessor, the game's story follows the Prince as he searches for a way to stop an entity called the Dahaka that is relentlessly pursuing him as punishment for his meddling with the Sands of Time. He travels to the mysterious Island of Time, where he attempts to prevent the Empress of Time from creating the Sands in the first place, hoping this act will appease the Dahaka.

Gameplay in Warrior Within builds upon that of The Sands of Time, adding new features, specifically options in combat. The Prince has the ability to wield two weapons at a time and to steal his enemies' weapons and throw them. The Prince's repertoire of combat moves has been expanded into varying strings that allow players to attack enemies with more complexity than was possible in the previous game. Warrior Within has a darker tone than its predecessor, adding in the ability for the Prince to dispatch his enemies with various gory finishing moves. In addition to the rewind, slow-down, and speed-up powers from The Sands of Time, the Prince also has a new sand power: a circular "wave" of sand that knocks down all surrounding enemies as well as damaging them.

Upon release, the game received generally positive reviews from critics, who singled out the improved combat, level design, story, and soundtrack. However, the radical shift in tone from its more light-hearted predecessor and the Prince's characterization garnered mixed reactions. Following Warrior Within, two more games set in The Sands of Time continuity were released: Prince of Persia: The Two Thrones in 2005, which is a direct sequel to Warrior Within; and Prince of Persia: The Forgotten Sands in 2010, set between The Sands of Time and Warrior Within.

== Gameplay ==
The Prince fighting one of the many monsters found throughout the game

Much as its predecessor, Warrior Within is a 3D platformer centered on exploration and melee combat. The level design revolves around navigating treacherous environments with parkour and freerunning-styled moves. Unlike The Sands of Time, the game world is highly nonlinear; the player would often return to already visited locations several times from various directions, often traversing time portals to visit the same places in the present and the past in order to find ways around obstacles which would be impassable in either time alone. Secret areas can be found and explored to gain additional health points and unique weapons, which culminates in discovering a weapon capable of inflicting damage on the Dahaka, unlocking the game's canonical ending. In addition to normal platforming, the game also features episodes where the Prince is chased by the Dahaka and must quickly navigate trap-ridden hallways to reach safety. The game's atmosphere has a distinctive darker and grittier theme, in contrast to the colorful palette of the previous game.

The game's combat system preserves aspects of the prior game's dual wield melee combat, while introducing new ones. While The Sands of Time designates a sword as the Prince's primary weapon and the Dagger of Time as his secondary weapon, Warrior Within makes the sword his mandatory primary weapon, while requiring him to obtain and find a secondary weapon from fallen enemies or weapon racks in order to use one. With this added feature, this new combat system emphasizes a free-flow fighting style. The idea is to use the environment, fifty eight secondary weapons and the Prince's own acrobatic abilities to dispatch enemies with ease and aggression, complete with graphic violence effects that can be toggled in the in-game options menu. Two-hand fighting introduces numerous additional acrobatic combos to dispatch enemies with greater efficiency and brutality. Off-hand weapons have varying bonuses and penalties applied to the player's damage and hit points; they can be thrown at enemies to allow a limited form of ranged combat. Most also have limited durability and break after a number of hits, or after they are thrown as projectiles. Aside from bosses, the enemies are sand creatures of varying sizes. Unlike The Sands of Time, where rounds of heavy combat are interspersed with rounds of exploration, enemies can be encountered anywhere along the way, alone and in packs; some common enemies would respawn as the player revisits locations.

As in The Sands of Time, the Prince possesses limited control of time with his Medallion of Time; the Sands can be used for more efficient combat as well as to slow down and even rewind time, allowing the Prince to retry ill-timed jumps or escape Dahaka's clutches; later on, he can unlock more devastating Sand Powers that can inflict area of effect damage. All sand powers now draw from a simplified and unified pool of sand tanks (unlike how The Sands of Time used a separate, special sand tank supply for its three offensive sand powers) with the more powerful abilities costing multiple full tanks to use.

The Xbox version of the game supports the ability to download extra maps via Xbox Live, as well as support for online leaderboards. In line with other online enabled games on Xbox, support ended on April 15, 2010. Prince of Persia: Warrior Within is now supported on Insignia, a revival server restoring online functionality for original Xbox games.

== Plot ==
Seven years after the events of The Sands of Time, following the reversal of his devastating release of the Sands in the palace of Azad, the Prince is hunted by a being called the Dahaka as the Prince was destined to die after releasing the Sands. Seeking advice from a wise man, the Prince learns the Sands were created on a distant island by the Empress of Time. Despite the wise man's warnings about changing fate, the Prince resolves to travel to the island and prevent the Sands' creation. The Prince's ship is attacked by Shahdee, servant of the Empress, but he survives and washes up on the island. He chases Shahdee into the ruins and follows her through a time portal into the past, killing her in combat after finding her attacking another woman, Kaileena. Despite believing the Prince's efforts are futile, Kaileena helps him gain access to the Empress's throne room. During his efforts, the Prince is stalked by a being called the Sand Wraith, which is captured and killed by the Dahaka. Before confronting the Empress, the Prince offers to take Kaileena to Babylon, but she reluctantly refuses.

In the throne room, Kaileena reveals herself as the Empress, attacking the Prince in an attempt to change her fate of death at his hands. The Prince kills her and returns to the present, but the Dahaka still pursues him; it was the Empress's death in the past that created the Sands of Time. Briefly losing hope, the Prince finds a carving from the army which first recovered the Sands, detailing an artefact called the Mask of the Wraith that allows the wearer to change their fate. He plans to use a time portal to bring Kaileena into the present, allowing the Sands to be created while negating their discovery and transportation to Azad, freeing him from the Dahaka. The Mask transforms the Prince into the same Sand Wraith which stalked him before, and he sees Kaileena's efforts to change her fate despite Shahdee's pessimism, and that she was fighting with a rebellious Shahdee when the Prince appeared. As the Sand Wraith, the Prince succeeds in getting his other self taken by the Dahaka instead, taking his place in the timeline and freeing him of the Mask. The Prince continues to the throne room and, despite his pleas to Kaileena that they can change fate, she attacks him as before.

The ending changes depending on whether the Prince acquired a special mythical weapon called the Water Sword. Without the Water Sword, the Prince kills Kaileena in the present as planned, and the Dahaka absorbs her and all remnants of the Sands of Time before vanishing. In the alternate ending (which is canonical and continues with the next game), the Prince defends Kaileena from the Dahaka's attack and uses the Water Sword to kill the time beast; the two then build a boat and leave the island, getting intimate with each other during the voyage. In both endings, Babylon is shown in flames and under attack from an invading army of the Vizier, while Farah (from The Sands of Time) is shown being held as a prisoner, with the wise man from earlier narrating "you cannot change your fate; no man can". Additionally, in the canonical ending, a hooded figure is seen crowning himself as the Prince, setting up the events of the next game.

== Development ==
Pre-production on Warrior Within began within Ubisoft Montreal during the final stages of production on The Sands of Time in 2003. Due to commitments writing the script for a Sands of Time movie adaptation, series creator Jordan Mechner was not involved in the production of Warrior Within. During early brainstorming sessions, the team decided to create a darker follow-up to The Sands of Time building on the existing gameplay. Production lasted roughly one year, with sixty new staff being brought on board to help production and using feedback from The Sands of Time for their work. Lead producer Bertrand Hélias described the production as having multiple highs and lows. The game used Jade, the same engine as The Sands of Time. The team were told by a Sony representative that they had hit the technical limits of the PlayStation 2, but the team found ways of adjusting the engine and getting more performance and larger environments. They also aimed for a similar push in graphical quality for the Xbox platform. The game was set to run at 30 frames per second, allowing more computing power to make other areas of the world work.

Senior producer Yannis Mallat found The Sands of Time short, so the sequel would be three times longer, while being more fleshed out regarding level design and combat. For considering the powers of the Sands of Time were not so essential to the gameplay of the first game and thus were hardly used by players, the gameplay of Warrior Within would integrate them further with moments that required "specific actions to be done". The world would be more open-ended to give a higher degree of freedom, and the different time periods would allow for level design changes. The team also incorporated some concepts and enemies that had to be cut from the previous game. The Prince's ability to slide down drapes using his swords was taken from a suggestion from fans in the Ubisoft forums. The free-form combat system, which allowed for both weapon switching and using the environment during combat, was born from the Prince's new persona as a hardened and skilled fighter. An early plan was for the Prince to not have a main weapon, with an option to fight bare handed, but this was dropped. The attack animations also drew inspiration from the fight scenes of Jackie Chan. Time-based powers were retained due to their central place in The Sands of Time, adding in further gameplay elements related to the Sands. Considering complaints on the final boss of The Sands of Time, focus would be given on finishing with a proper climactic battle. The team also included more actual boss fights, again due to feedback. The expanded gameplay capacities of the Prince necessitated a redesign of the enemy AI and environments to both accommodate it and continue presenting a challenge to players.

=== Writing and art design ===
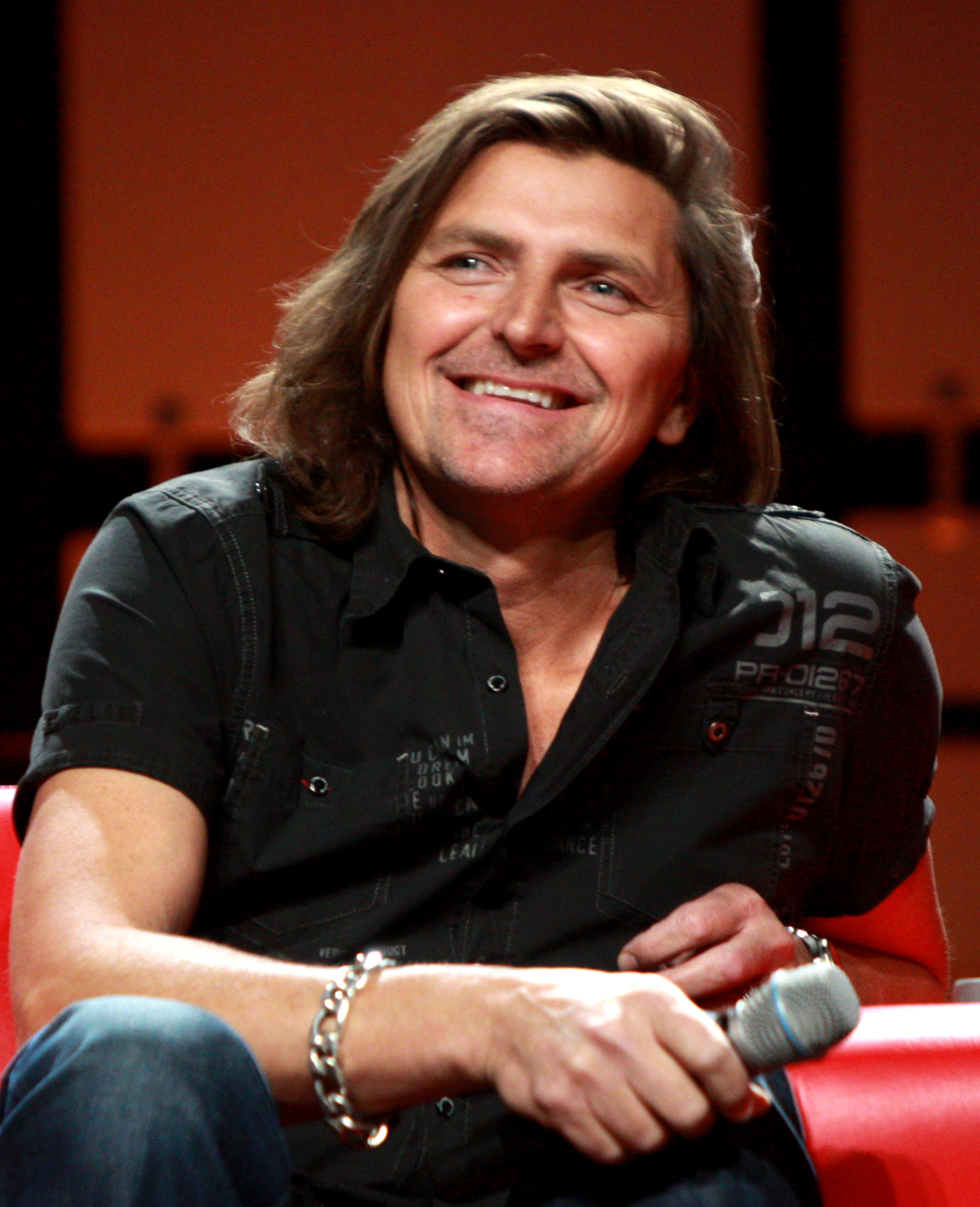
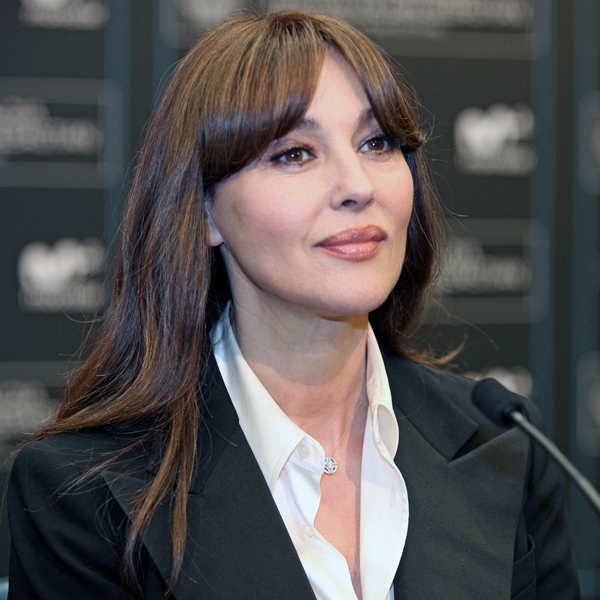
Robin Atkin Downes (left) replaced Yuri Lowenthal as the Prince, while Monica Bellucci (right) voiced lead heroine Kaileena.

One of the notable changes compared to The Sands of Time was the visual design and presentation of the Prince. Mallat was approached by the pre-production team, who wanted to go in a darker direction than The Sands of Time. Mallat felt the Prince in The Sands of Time was lacking something despite being a good character, and the darker direction both appealed to his wish to evolve the series and was given the go-ahead by Ubisoft's marketing team. The first idea developed by The Sands of Time director Patrice Désilets, Prince of Persia: Assassin, where the player controlled a group of assassins who guarded the Prince, evolved into its own game, Assassin's Creed, keeping Désilets away from the sequel. The plot was eventually chosen to be "not just saving the world or saving a damsel, it's the story of the Prince of Persia and who, really, is this guy." The final narrative and aesthetic tone was described as being closer to survival horror, with the Prince becoming a more mature and potentially relatable character compared to his portrayal in The Sands of Time. Some of the story was communicated outside cutscenes, with the team aiming for a more interactive story experience. Hugues Martel, lead animator for The Triplets of Belleville, acted as an advisor and concept artist for the cutscenes and storyboards, working together with art director Raphaël Lacoste.

The script was written by Corey May and Dooma Wendschuh of Sekretagent Productions. They were brought on board when they approached Ubisoft about adapting one of their other video game series for television, working with the production team to incorporate the narrative into the gameplay. Hiring professional scriptwriters was part of the team's effort to make the Prince and the overall narrative feel more realistic. They described the story's theme as showing that anything could be possible when enough effort was given, shown through the Prince attempting to achieve the impossible and change his fate. The story was meant to be relatable to players, with the Prince being shown as frightened and desperate due to the Dahaka's pursuit. The female characters were written to initially appear as stereotypes, such as Kaileena being a damsel-in-distress, then subvert player expectations later in the story. Developing enemy personalities was the motivation behind including dialogue between the Prince and his enemies. The original game's style of narration by a character was dropped for Warrior Within, with Mallat later feeling "something was lost" from the presentation because of this. Lead designer Kevin Guillemette likened the progression of the Prince's story to The Sands of Time being him as a teenager coming of age, while Warrior Within was his entrance into adulthood, breaking "the playful mood that you had as a teenager" given "you're affected by your past experiences, and all the events that you lived through." Jean-Christophe Guyot, who was promoted to director after working on the level design of The Sands of Time, said a core idea was to "play a little bit more with the paradox" brought in by the Prince's manipulation of time.

The voice of the Prince was recast from The Sands of Time, with Robin Atkin Downes replacing Yuri Lowenthal. In a later interview, Lowenthal felt that this was a conscious decision by Ubisoft to fit in with the game's overall tonal shift, and thought it was the right decision. Lead sound designer Jonathan Pilon explained the change as necessary due to the Prince's more hardened and world-worn portrayal, in addition to the new voice better fitting his redesigned appearance. Kaileena is voiced by Italian actress Monica Bellucci. She accepted the role based on interest in the story, and her liking of Kaileena's character due to her personality and her position as someone who knows their fate. The role was a "new experience" due to using only her voice to give personality to an otherwise animated character. As with her other roles, she had a voice coach to prepare herself for the character.

The art direction was influenced by the storyline to become "darker and more oppressive", using a "monochromatic" palate to create a consistent design throughout the game's areas and communicate the narrative and gameplay. Each time period would express opposite feelings through different palettes and elements, with the present using desaturated colors and buildings overtaken by vegetation, while the past has brighter colors and a "luxurious, and still somehow intimidating" look. Persia still served as the main visual influence, only this time focusing on more ancient Near East locations like Babylon and its Hanging Gardens. The art was created using computers, with an incremental process of beginning with broad strokes to establish mood and then adding finer detail. The overall artistic and character design also drew inspiration from the movie adaptations of The Lord of the Rings.

The Prince was redesigned, with the two artists most involved being Mikael Labat and Nicolas Bouvier. During the early stages, some hybrid designs with his appearance in The Sands of Time were created, but it was soon decided that the team was not being radical enough with the redesign. His "charisma" needed to be new, yet consistent with the events of The Sands of Time. His new armor reflected this change: it is made up of interlaced leather straps, granting him protection while giving him freedom to perform his acrobatic movements. The new character design had more variety in the enemy types. The graphic design was improved over the first game, with additional detail to character models and environments, and improvements to the lighting engine. The aim was to create as realistic a render as possible of the team's artwork, whether it was realistic or fantastical. The CGI cutscene animations were based on live action shots created during pre-production with members of Two Worlds Theatre. The team worked with minimal props and outfits, filming fifteen minutes of footage over two days. Those early movies continued to be a reference for the team when creating character movements. The panning camera shots showing large environments and interactive elements drew direct inspiration from Jackie Chan's work.

=== Audio ===
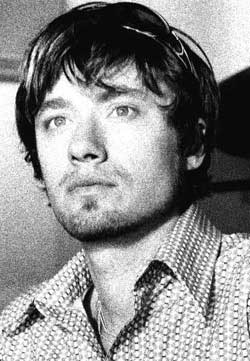
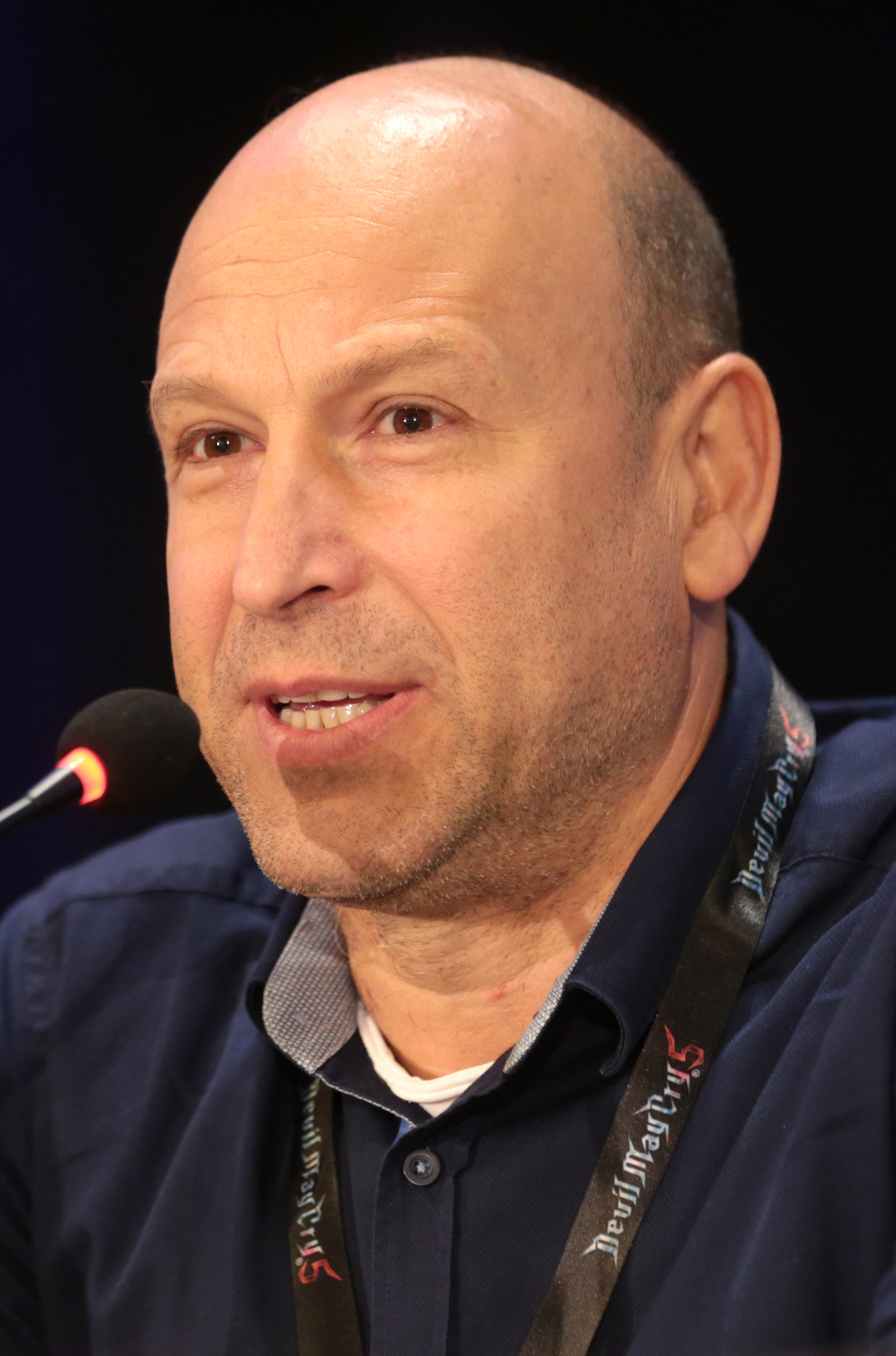
The Sands of Time composer Stuart Chatwood (left) returned to co-write the musical score with Inon Zur (right); each respectively used heavy metal and orchestral styles.

Pilon had worked on the previous game's sound design, and with the rest of the sound team wanted to create a darker atmosphere both in the music and overall sound design. While some sounds for the Prince's movement were reused from The Sands of Time, most of the sound design for the environment and enemies was new. The goal was to have players feel like they were cutting down real enemies, with the sound design aiming for a visceral style. There was an increased range of sounds for enemies, including some garbled voice lines. They used the same sound output support used in The Sands of Time; Dolby Pro Logic for PS2 and GameCube, Dolby Digital for Xbox, and both Dolby Digital and EAX for PC.

Stuart Chatwood, composer of The Sands of Time and member of Canadian rock band The Tea Party, returned to compose the in-game music of Warrior Within. He was involved from an early stage, with Ubisoft providing concept art and gameplay videos so he could create music inspired by them. Matching the tonal shift of Warrior Within, the music was taken in a darker direction, with Ubisoft wanting a "heavy sounding score". To achieve this, the in-game music made use of heavy metal music. While these were used for action and fight sequences, more ambient themes were used for exploration. The Arabic elements from the previous game were retained, but made "subtle" and less prominent. Also joining the project was Inon Zur, a multimedia composer known for his orchestral style. He later described his work as focusing on cutscenes and "big battles". Ubisoft wanted orchestral music during the cutscenes to contrast against the in-game music, leading them to bringing Zur on board. Zur's music was performed by the Hollywood Studio Orchestra and recorded at Warner Bros. Studios, Burbank.

Alongside original music, the tracks "I Stand Alone" and "Straight Out of Line" were licensed from rock band Godsmack. Use of these songs were mostly limited to encounters with the Dahaka. In retrospect, staff members noted a mixed reaction from fans to the musical change. An English soundtrack release was impossible due to technical issues with the music contract. A soundtrack album was released in Japan by Team Entertainment on October 19, 2005. Music from Warrior Within was included in a soundtrack album as a pre-order bonus for the PS2 and Xbox versions of The Two Thrones. Music from Warrior Within was later included in digital compilation album released on January 3, 2011.

== Reception ==
Reception

Aggregate score
Aggregator	Score					
Aggregator	GameCube	iOS	PC	PS2	PSP	Xbox
Metacritic	83/100	72/100	83/100	83/100	65/100	83/100

Review scores
Publication	Score					
Publication	GameCube	iOS	PC	PS2	PSP	Xbox
Edge	N/A	N/A	N/A	7/10	5/10	N/A
Electronic Gaming Monthly	8.5/10	N/A	N/A	8.5/10	N/A	8.5/10
Eurogamer	N/A	N/A	N/A	N/A	6/10	7/10
Game Informer	9.25/10	N/A	N/A	9.25/10	7.75/10	9.25/10
GamePro	N/A	N/A	N/A	4.5/5	N/A	N/A
GameRevolution	B	N/A	N/A	B	N/A	B
GameSpot	8.8/10	N/A	8.6/10	8.8/10	7.4/10	8.7/10
GameSpy	3/5	N/A	3.5/5	3/5	3/5	3/5
GameZone	N/A	N/A	9.1/10	9.4/10	N/A	8.7/10
IGN	8.6/10	6.9/10	8.6/10	8.5/10	6/10	8.7/10
Nintendo Power	4.6/5	N/A	N/A	N/A	N/A	N/A
Official U.S. PlayStation Magazine	N/A	N/A	N/A	4/5	2.5/5	N/A
Official Xbox Magazine (US)	N/A	N/A	N/A	N/A	N/A	9.6/10
PC Gamer (US)	N/A	N/A	64%	N/A	N/A	N/A
Detroit Free Press	N/A	N/A	N/A	N/A	N/A	4/4
The Sydney Morning Herald	4/5	N/A	4/5	4/5	N/A	4/5

According to Ubisoft, Prince of Persia: Warrior Within sold 1.9 million units worldwide in its debut month, 1.8 Million in the first two weeks. The game's PlayStation 2 version received a "Gold" sales award from the Entertainment and Leisure Software Publishers Association (ELSPA), indicating sales of at least 200,000 copies in the United Kingdom.

Critical reviews of Warrior Within ranged from positive to mixed. The GameCube, PC, PlayStation 2 and Xbox versions received "favorable" reviews, while the iOS and PSP versions received "mixed or average reviews" according to the review aggregation website Metacritic. Elsewhere, the mobile phone version received "universal acclaim" according to GameRankings. Reviewers praised the inclusion and familiar platforming elements of the previous game with mixed feelings of the new combat elements. Warrior Within also contained more content than The Sands of Time, taking anywhere from 15–20 hours to complete.

Jordan Mechner, who was the creator of the original Prince of Persia and worked on The Sands of Time but not Warrior Within, commented in Wired that "I'm not a fan of the artistic direction, or the violence that earned it an M rating. The story, character, dialog, voice acting, and visual style were not to my taste." Director Guyot said that by following the suggestion of making the sequel "tonally a little darker", eventually "we overdid, probably, a little bit", which led to many fans of The Sands of Time being disappointed at Warrior Within.

Eurogamer complained that the game lost much of its charm by making the game's visuals grimier, the story less involving and mature compared to The Sands of Time, and the addition of blood and scantily-clad female characters was in poor taste. Penny Arcade parodied the Prince in comic form, claiming the once witty, likeable Prince character, turned into a more aggressive Gothic character, making him a "cookie cutter brooding tough guy with zero personality". GameSpot, who in their year-end awards griped on the tonal shift saying that "the series had to lose a measure of its soul for us to enjoy more of that fantastic gameplay", also criticized the game for having uneven difficulty progression and numerous glitches and bugs.

IGN gave the Mobile version 9.6 out of 10, calling it "Gameloft's triumph" and "likely the best game of the year". GameSpot gave the same version 9.2 out of 10, calling it "a dominant game on its own merits, but it's identical to the first game in one respect: Anyone who is remotely interested in playing an action game on their handset should download it." In Japan, Famitsu gave the PS2 version a score of one nine, two eights, and one nine for a total of 34 out of 40.

Non-video game publications also gave the game some favorable reviews. Detroit Free Press gave the Xbox version all four stars and stated: "The prince has gone from an "Aladdin"-style teenager to a grim, angry young adult. He's even more beautifully drawn than before, and this year's installment adds a much better combat system." The Sydney Morning Herald gave the game four stars out of five, saying, "Exploring the labyrinthine citadel is rewarding, although backtracking and frequent deaths can be frustrating." However, The New York Times panned the game by giving it an unfavorable review and stating that, "The tone of the game has gone from an Arabian Nights fantasy to something akin to a Marilyn Manson music video. In dark and grimy settings, the once gallant prince curses and jeers as he swings his sword at demons whose decapitations are lovingly shown in slow motion to a soundtrack of screeching guitars."

The editors of Computer Gaming World nominated Warrior Within for their 2004 "Action Game of the Year" award, which ultimately went to The Chronicles of Riddick: Escape from Butcher Bay. During the 8th Annual Interactive Achievement Awards, the Academy of Interactive Arts & Sciences awarded Warrior Within with "Console Platform Action/Adventure Game of the Year", along with receiving nominations for outstanding achievement in "Animation" and "Art Direction".
