= Stolen (video game) =

2005 video game

- European PC cover art
- Developer: Blue52
- Publisher: Hip Games
- Directors: Jaid Mindang (art); Allan Murphy (tech)
- Producer: Graeme Puttock
- Designer: Jonathan Biddle
- Programmer: Jim Tebbut
- Artist: Joe Myers
- Composer: Ian Livingstone
- Platforms: Windows, PlayStation 2, Xbox
- Release: EU: April 1, 2005; EU: April 8, 2005 (Xbox); NA: April 21, 2005 (PS2); NA: April 22, 2005; AU: April 26, 2005 (PS2, Xbox)
- Genres: Stealth, platform
- Mode: Single-player

Stolen is a 2005 stealth video game developed by British developer Blue52 and published by Hip Games for the PlayStation 2, Xbox and Microsoft Windows. It was the final game to be developed by Blue52, with the company shuttering during development and its members moving to what would later become Curve Games.

== Gameplay ==
Stolen is a stealth game in which the protagonist Anya has several hi-tech gadgets to assist her in her cat burglar escapades, including night vision goggles and a multi-use dart gun. Because of her personal moral criminal code, Anya has no lethal arms at her disposal and the player cannot kill any of the guards and other enemies she encounters, but can only knock them unconscious for a brief moment. Anya is assisted by the computer expert Louie Palmer, who communicates with her through an earpiece. The GameSpot review noted the game's "Prince of Persia-inspired feats," but opined "the only difficult part about Stolen is finding the patience to actually remain hidden when it's easier to just charge through the levels."

== Plot ==
The player assumes the role of Anya Romanov, an acrobatic, high-tech professional thief living in the futuristic dark metropolis Forge City, (USA). Her initial mission is to infiltrate a high-security museum and steal items therein. Later on, Anya is framed for murder she did not commit. Eventually, she finds out about a sinister conspiracy involving a ruthless corrupt politician Richard Killian and her own deadly female ninja rival known only as Breeze.

== Reception ==
Reception

Aggregate score
Aggregator	Score		
Aggregator	PC	PS2	Xbox
Metacritic	48/100	51/100	50/100

Review scores
Publication	Score		
Publication	PC	PS2	Xbox
1Up.com	N/A	N/A	D+
Edge	N/A	5/10	N/A
Game Informer	N/A	6.5/10	6.5/10
GameSpot	5.3/10	5/10	5/10
GameSpy	N/A	2/5	2/5
GameTrailers	6.8/10	6.8/10	6.8/10
GameZone	N/A	N/A	6/10
IGN	N/A	5.2/10	5.2/10
Official U.S. PlayStation Magazine	N/A	3/5	N/A
Official Xbox Magazine (US)	N/A	N/A	3.8/10
PC Gamer (US)	28%	N/A	N/A

The PlayStation 2 and Xbox versions received "mixed" reviews, while the PC version received "generally unfavorable reviews", according to the review aggregation website Metacritic.
