= The Plague (2006 film) =

- Directed by: Hal Masonberg
- Written by: Hal Masonberg; Teal Minton
- Produced by: Clive Barker; Jorge Saralegui; Martin Wiley; Matt Milich; Tim O'Hair; Anthony DiBlasi
- Starring: James Van Der Beek; Ivana Miličević
- Cinematography: Bill Butler
- Edited by: Ed Marx
- Music by: László Reményi
- Production companies: Midnight Picture Show; Armada Pictures
- Distributed by: Sony Pictures Home Entertainment
- Release date: September 5, 2006
- Running time: 88 minutes
- Country: United States
- Language: English

The Plague (also known as Clive Barker's The Plague) is a 2006 horror movie directed by Hal Masonberg and written by Masonberg and Teal Minton. It was produced by Clive Barker.

== Plot ==
On one day in 1983, every single child younger than the age of nine simultaneously becomes catatonic. For the next ten years, every child is born in a state of catatonia. During this state, the children experience seizures twice a day, which develops and maintains muscle mass.

In 1993, all the children awaken simultaneously in a zombie-like state, and begin pursuing, attacking and murdering all adults. The children have both superhuman strength and some kind of collective intelligence - what one learns, they all learn.

The children's tactics quickly become more sophisticated. They disable the engines in almost every car and build roadblocks to stop the adults from escaping. Then they learn how to use firearms. The children also take the souls of the ones they kill. Tom, his ex-wife Jean, and a few other people form a team and try to survive, but all are killed gradually except for Tom and Jean. In the end, the children disappear with Tom.

== Cast ==
- James Van Der Beek as Tom Russell
- Ivana Miličević as Jean Raynor
- Brad Hunt as Sam Raynor
- Joshua Close as Kip
- Brittany Scobie as Claire
- Bradley Sawatzky as Nathan Burgandy
- John P. Connolly as Sheriff Cal Stewart
- Dee Wallace as Nora
- John Ted Wynne as Dr. Jenkins
- Arne McPherson as David

== Release ==
The Region 1 DVD was released September 5, 2006. The Plague: Writer's & Director's Cut, exists but has, to date, has remained unreleased.

== Reception ==
Bloody Disgusting rated it 3/5 stars and wrote, "But even as the premise of The Plague continues to titillate and intrigue, the film can’t quite deliver on its promise, rendering it slightly entertaining and ultimately forgettable." Steve Barton of Dread Central rated it 2/5 stars and wrote, "Clive Barker may have in some way produced this mess and lent his name to it, but rest assured there’s nothing Barker-esque about it. All that's here is a giant missed opportunity which — pardon the really bad, yet fitting pun — you should avoid like the plague." Scott Weinberg of DVD Talk rated it 2.5/5 stars and wrote that it does not live up the premise, instead "devolving into yet another (and very stale) zombie-type chase thriller". David Johnson of DVD Verdict wrote, "The Plague is an inscrutable movie that starts out strong, but loses forward momentum, eventually grinding to an awkward halt."

== See also ==
- Village of the Damned (1960 film) (similar plot)
