= Prince of Persia: The Lost Crown =

2024 video game

- Developer: Ubisoft Montpellier (Note: Additional development by Ubisoft Bucharest, Ubisoft Kyiv, and Ubisoft Pune. MacOS and mobile ports developed by Ubisoft Da Nang.)
- Publisher: Ubisoft
- Director: Mounir Radi
- Producer: Abdelhak Elguess
- Designers: Christophe Pic; Bertrand Israel
- Artist: Jean-Christophe Alessandri
- Writer: Jacques Exertier
- Composers: Mentrix; Gareth Coker
- Series: Prince of Persia
- Engine: Unity
- Platforms: Nintendo Switch; PlayStation 4; PlayStation 5; Windows; Xbox One; Xbox Series X/S; macOS; Android; iOS
- Release: 18 January 2024: Nintendo Switch, PS4, PS5, Windows, Xbox One, Xbox Series X/S 18 January 2024 macOS 3 December 2024 Android, iOS 14 April 2025
- Genres: Action-adventure, platform
- Mode: Single-player

Prince of Persia: The Lost Crown is a 2024 action-adventure game developed and published by Ubisoft. It is part of the Prince of Persia video game franchise, and returns to the 2D side-scrolling gameplay perspective of the original 1989 video game. The player assumes control of Sargon, a young member of the warrior clan The Immortals, who must travel to the mythical Mount Qaf to rescue a kidnapped prince. Players explore the game world to find shortcuts, secret rooms, and gameplay upgrades. As the game progresses, Sargon gains the ability to manipulate time and perform highly acrobatic moves. The Lost Crown is a Metroidvania game in which locations are interconnected.

The Lost Crown is the first main entry in the franchise following Prince of Persia: The Forgotten Sands (2010). Ubisoft Montpellier experimented with 2D Prince of Persia prototypes, and work on The Lost Crown started in 2019 after the studio had assembled a team of developers with experience in world-building and creating platforming gameplay. The game's combat system was inspired by 2D fighting games, and by Shōnen manga and superhero comics for its art direction. The developers' experience working on Rayman games also helped its production; they aimed to modernize the series by reintroducing familiar staples, and prioritized accessibility. Gareth Coker and Mentrix composed the game's music, and it is one of the first video games to be dubbed into Persian (Farsi).

The game was officially revealed in June 2023 and received a mixed reaction from players. The Lost Crown was released for Nintendo Switch, PlayStation 4, PlayStation 5, Windows, Xbox One, and Xbox Series X/S in January 2024, and for Android and iOS in April 2025. The game received positive reviews from critics, who praised its map and location design, combat, and accessibility features while criticizing its narrative. It was regarded as a return to form for the franchise and one of the greatest Metroidvania games. Ubisoft supported The Lost Crown with free updates and a paid expansion pack titled Mask of Darkness, which was released in September 2024. The game attracted more than three million players, though it failed to meet Ubisoft's sales expectations, leading to the development team's disbandment.

== Gameplay ==
In this screenshot, Sargon visits a "Wak-Wak Tree", which serves as a save point for players.

Prince of Persia: The Lost Crown is a 2.5D side-scrolling action-adventure game. The player assumes control of Sargon, a young member of the warrior clan The Immortals, who must travel to the cursed city of Mount Qaf to rescue the kidnapped Prince Ghassan. Sargon is equipped with a pair of daggers with which he defeats enemies. Launching several consecutive attacks forms a combo. Sargon can also perform aerial attacks by launching enemies into the air. Attacks can be charged to deal larger damage or create a blast that affects multiple enemies. If the player successfully parries a hostile attack before they hit, they will stagger the enemy. Attacks denoted with yellow flashes can be parried with "vengeful counters", a special type of counterattack that triggers a short cutscene showing Sargon dealing devastating damage and immediately incapacitating weaker enemies. Failing this parry will deplete a significant part of Sargon's health. Some attacks are unblockable; players can only dodge to avoid being hit. As the game progresses, players unlock bows and arrows and a chakram, allowing Sargon to hit enemies from afar. As players progress, they accumulate points for unleashing powerful attacks named "Athra Surges", which are divided into three ranks based on their power and the points they consume.

Sargon is an agile character whose basic movement options include jumping and sliding. The Lost Crown is also a platform game in which players travel between platforms while avoiding deadly contraptions and environment hazards. As they progress through the game, players unlock time powers that allow Sargon to manipulate time and perform feats such as air dashing, double jumping, and grappling onto faraway objects. These powers include special abilities like the Shadow of the Simurgh, which lets players place a temporary checkpoint to which they can instantaneously return; the Dimensional Claw, which is used to capture and toss objects or enemies; and Clairvoyance, which toggles platforms between solid and incorporeal states. These time powers, alongside Sargon's weapons, are used to solve puzzles and remove obstacles. The game introduces several accessibility features, allowing players to independently toggle the difficulty of the game's exploration, platforming and combat. For instance, players can toggle a platform-assist option that allows them to skip some difficult platforming sections.

The Lost Crown features Metroidvania elements; locations are interconnected, and filled with shortcuts and secret rooms. If players explore alternative paths, they may find side quests, optional boss encounters, treasure chests, and health upgrades. They may also collect amulets that provide players with passive gameplay perks. The game supports up to 12 amulet slots, though more-powerful amulets occupy multiple spaces. Some areas in the game are inaccessible until players unlock the necessary tools and gadgets. As players explore the game world, they can find Time crystals that can be used to purchase upgrades for Sargon's weapons and abilities, as well as maps showing the layout of each biome and locations of interest. Players also find statues that serve as fast travel points, and trails of golden leaves that guide players to "Wak-Wak trees" that serve as respawn points for Sargon if the player character died in combat or during exploration. Wak-Wak trees also restores Sargon's health and refill his potions, and allow players to change their amulets and Athra Surges. Players can take screenshots and pin them to the game's map, allowing them to recognize and remember unsolved puzzles they have encountered. The game can be played in both Guided and Exploration modes; Guided mode marks the locations of quest objectives on the players' map, whereas Exploration mode removes them, forcing players to look for hints from the characters and the world.

== Plot ==
After experiencing over 30 years of drought and famine, and an invasion from the Kushan Empire, the Persian Empire is on the brink of collapse. The latest Kushan invasion into Persian territory is repelled thanks to the efforts of the Immortals clan. Sargon, the clan's youngest member, personally defeats and kills the Kushan general Uvishka. Queen Thomyris and Prince Ghassan commend Sargon and the Immortals for their efforts but Sargon's mentor General Anahita abducts the prince during the victory celebrations. Sargon and the Immortals pursue Anahita to the sacred Mount Qaf, home to a citadel that was a great center of learning until it was destroyed by an unknown curse. The Immortals begin to suspect Anahita plans to use Ghassan's royal blood to access the temple of the Simurgh and gain the divine bird's blessing, which would allow her to overthrow Thomyris.

The Immortals enter the citadel but find themselves trapped inside due to a time anomaly. They split up to search for Anahita, and Sargon quickly encounters undead soldiers and monsters, and other trapped humans who help him. Sargon also begins to find and recover the Simurgh's feathers, each of which grants him magical abilities and a portion of the god's power. Sargon catches up to Anahita and saves Ghassan. The Immortals' leader, Vahram, intervenes and kill the prince, revealing himself as the true culprit who intends to usurp Thomyris. Sargon buys time for Anahita to escape, but Vahram's mastery of time magic defeats Sargon and he is thrown from a cliff. Sargon survives the fall and discovers a mysterious old man named Alkara, who informs him there is a chance to reverse time and save Ghassan, but he must make a bargain with the evil snake god Azhdaha. Azhdaha instructs Sargon to gain the blessing of the four Celestial Guardians. Sargon also encounters Anahita, who claims she kidnapped Ghassan on Thomyris' orders. Meanwhile, Vahram lies to the rest of the Immortals, claiming Sargon killed Ghassan, and persuades most of them to support his claim to the throne. Sargon is forced to kill several of his former Immortals comrades.

After securing the favor of the Celestial Guardians, Sargon is sent back in time. He thwarts Vahram's attempt to murder Ghassan, but Anahita dies while protecting Sargon. Vahram then admits he has also been collecting the Simurgh's feathers; he believes only he is worthy of possessing them, and he battles Sargon. As their powers clash, Sargon glimpses Vahram's past and learns Vahram is actually the long-lost son of King Darius, who Thomyris assassinated, and that Thomyris' usurpation of the throne without the Simurgh's blessing caused Persia's 30 years of decline. Ghassan informs Sargon Vahram is likely seeking the Heart of the Simurgh so he can merge with it and take the Simurgh's full power.

Sargon pursues Vahram but is unable to stop him from merging with the Heart and ascending to godhood. The spirit of the Simurgh contacts Sargon and assures him he still has the power to defeat and save Vahram from himself. Sargon again confronts Vahram and, after a protracted battle, is able to defeat him. Vahram realizes the folly of trying to claim a god's power, and sacrifices himself to summon the Simurgh back. With the Simurgh returned, Sargon and Ghassan return to Persepolis as heroes. Knowing the truth about his mother, Ghassan abdicates his position and Sargon tells the entire royal court Thomyris murdered Darius. As Sargon leaves the capital, the remaining Immortals assure him they will take care of a younger version of Vahram who the Mount's time anomaly created and escaped with them.

Throughout the game, players find scattered lore notes containing a prophecy that implies Sargon is actually a legitimate heir to Thomyris, and that Ghassan was used as a decoy prince. Thomyris staged Ghassan's kidnapping to orchestrate the events on Mount Qaf, plotting to have Sargon succeed her throne.

== Development ==
Prince of Persia: The Lost Crown was developed by Ubisoft Montpellier with support by Ubisoft studios in Bucharest, Kyiv, and Pune. The development team did not set out to make a side-scrolling game, though they had prototyped 2D Prince of Persia games. Development of the game started in 2019 after the studio had assembled a team of developers with expertise in world building and creating platforming gameplay. The Lost Crown was positioned as a standalone chapter in the Prince of Persia series; It has no narrative connection to the previous games and is not a spin-off of the series. To give the franchise an identity distinct from that of Assassin's Creed, (Note: Assassin's Creed was Ubisoft's flagship franchise, acting as a spiritual successor to Prince of Persia.) the team analyzed past games in the franchise and researched how to best reintroduce it to modern audiences. The game's director, Mounir Radi, said the franchise's four core pillars are acrobatic fights, puzzles, platforming gameplay, and narrative. The developer wanted to retain the franchise's setting and its emphasis on time-manipulation powers, while adding a twist to make them more novel. As a result, the Prince returns in The Lost Crown but is no longer a playable character. The time-rewind power that was introduced in Prince of Persia: The Sands of Time (2003) is wielded by the game's antagonist rather than the playable character. To follow the franchise's tradition of having an unnamed protagonist, Sargon initially did not have a name. The character's name was added near the end of the game's development to allow players to develop a strong emotional attachment to him. The developers described Sargon as a young, agile warrior. With Sargon, the team hoped to modernize the franchise's image by introducing "fresh visual design" that references "modern culture, urban culture, and fashion".

Key developers had worked on both Rayman Origins (2010) and Rayman Legends (2013). To make the gameplay structure more open and less linear than their past works, they decided to make The Lost Crown a Metroidvania, a gameplay genre that Modi felt evokes the darker, isolated tone of the original game. As with the Rayman games, platforming gameplay has a focus on rhythm and musicality; combinations of movements would begin to flow naturally as Sargon sprints through stages and levels. The platforming gameplay was designed to be difficult in a manner similar to that of the original game. As with other Metroidvania games, the upgrades in the game are gradually rolled out to empower players, and encourage them to revisit previously locked locations with new strategies and to approach objectives in multiple ways. The game retains traditional platforming sections that must be played in specific ways to progress in the form of Xerxes challenges. Ubisoft made accessibility a key priority, involving the entire project team. In contrast with other Metroidvania games, which require players to memorize locations and map layouts, The Lost Crown allows players to take screenshots and pin them to the map. While the team wanted players to feel "lost" while exploring, Guided mode was added to better lead players to their objectives.

Despite its side-scrolling gameplay, levels were built as three-dimensional spaces, allowing the game camera to move within the game world and shift perspective during some gameplay actions. The success of Metroid Dread (2020) boosted the team's confidence in incorporating 3D environment and assets in a 2D game. According to the game's art director, Jean-Christophe Alessandri, the team was inspired by Shōnen manga, superhero comics. and street art. Flashy, vibrant colors were used to depict Sargon's special attacks to emphasize their overpowered nature and create memorable moments for players. Radi compared Sargon to Vegeta, while Dragon Ball, Sword of the Stranger, Hunter x Hunter, Berserk, and Demon Slayer all inspired the team. The animation style of the Spider-Verse movies also influenced the game. The animators worked with motion capture technicians and stuntmen, who performed individual attack poses to make offensive abilities appear grounded. Combat was inspired by 2D fighting games. The control scheme uses one button for attacking; Radi cited games such as Super Smash Bros. and Street Fighter as inspiration. Sargon's fighting style was inspired by tricking, which has elements of martial arts, dance, and free running, and the team compared his movement and fighting style to those of a tiger.

The developers believed their art style contributed to The Lost Crown's story, which was designed to be "larger-than-life" with more of a focus on fantastical elements than its predecessor. The game was heavily inspired by Persian mythology and Zoroastrianism, and the developers wanted to show how they affected other mythologies by introducing monsters, like the manticore, as boss characters. The game's story was inspired by folklore surrounding the Simurgh, which Radi described as "a time divinity that has witnessed the end of the world". The Metroidvania structure allowed the use of diverse landscapes, from large, lavish locations similar to those in One Thousand and One Nights to claustrophobic, trap-filled, tight spaces similar to those in the original game. Unlike other Metroidvania games, The Lost Crown has a significant emphasis on its narrative. The developers described Sargon as a "superhero in Legendary Persia", and compared the game's narrative to a "coming-of-age" story in which Sargon transforms from a warrior to a "strong man". The story of Miyamoto Musashi strongly influenced the team. Like Japanese anime, the game explores dark, philosophical topics, despite its visually pleasing aesthetics.

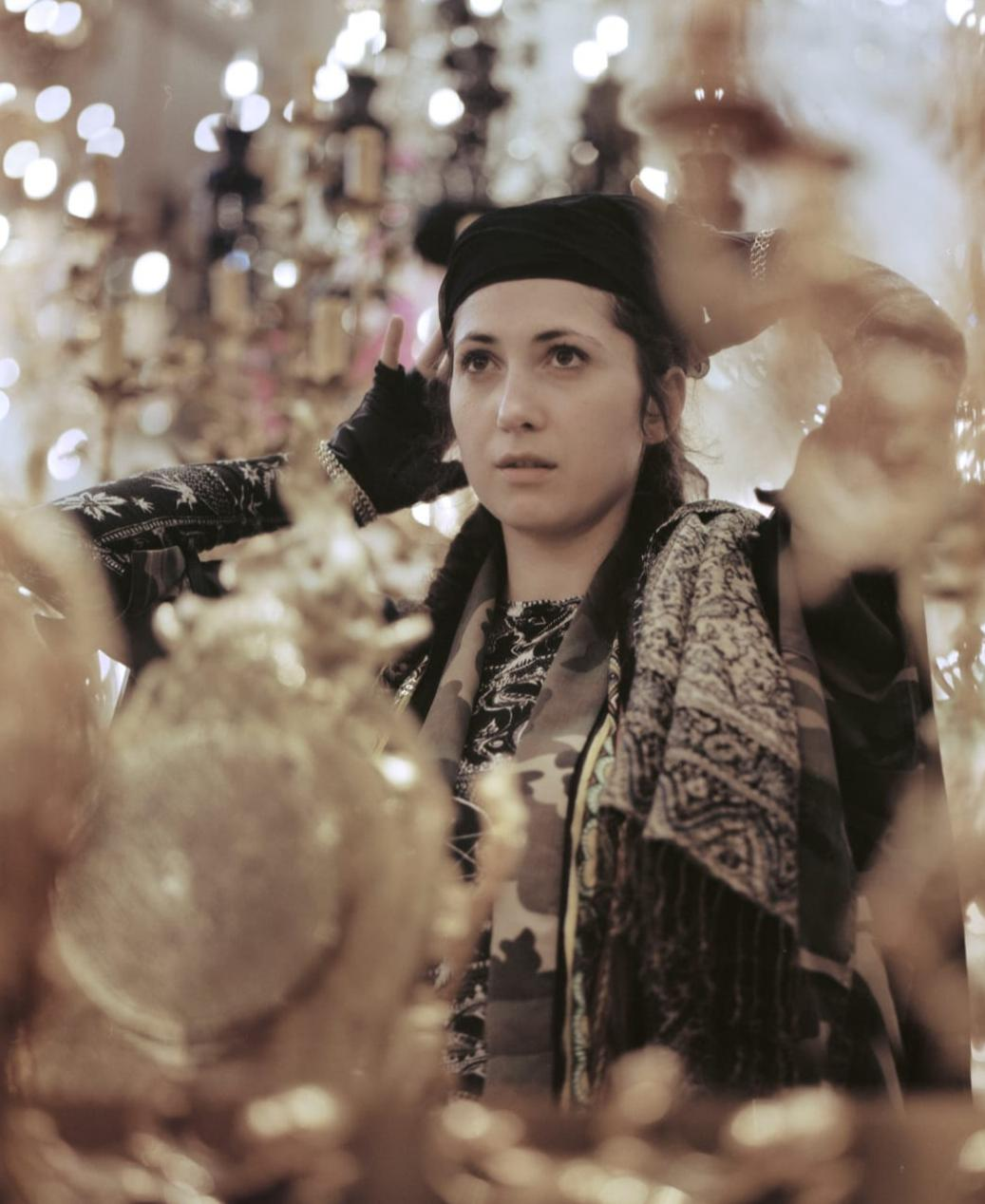
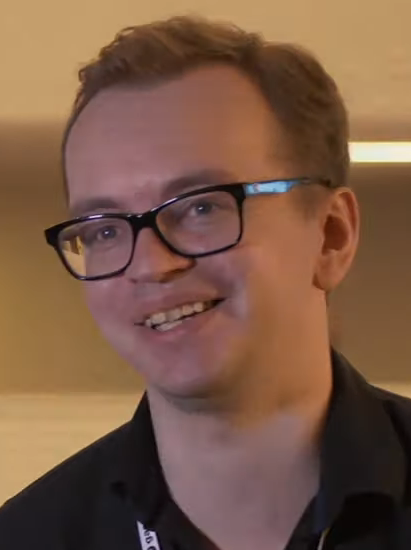
Mentrix (left) and Gareth Coker (right) served as the game's composers.

The game's music was composed by Gareth Coker and Berlin-based, Iranian-born composer Mentrix (Samar Rad). Mentrix's debut album, My Enemy, My Love, and Coker's score for Mario + Rabbids Sparks of Hope, caught the attention of Ubisoft, which invited the duo to work on The Lost Crown. According to Mentrix, Ubisoft requested an original soundtrack that avoided common clichés associated with Middle Eastern music. The composers did not directly collaborate; Coker joined the team during the final year of development as Mentrix was concluding her work. Mentrix scored the game's exploration sequences using traditional Persian instruments like the tar, the kamancheh, the daf, and the ney. Coker handled some of the cinematics and boss battles, primarily relying on a Western orchestral palette. Coker also composed the game's main theme, which features vocals by Mentrix. Side London provided casting and voice-recording services for The Lost Crown. The Lost Crown has been dubbed into Persian (Farsi), being one of the first video games to do so. Sepehr Torabi, who voiced five characters in the Persian version, said he did not know what the final product was while he was voice acting for the game.

== Release ==
Prince of Persia: The Lost Crown was announced in June 2023. Its debut trailer received mixed reactions; while some commentators liked the return of the 2D perspective, the use of rap music was criticized for being inauthentic to the setting. Series creator Jordan Mechner, while not directly involved in the game's development, voiced his support for the developers and wrote that he was "thrilled that Prince of Persia is getting a new start after so long, from such a great team". Players who purchased the Digital Deluxe Edition could access the game three days before its general release, and received in-game cosmetic items, while players who pre-ordered the game received a costume based on Prince of Persia: Warrior Within (2004). A free demo, which received a significantly more positive reaction, was also released.

The Lost Crown was released for Nintendo Switch, PlayStation 4, PlayStation 5, Windows via the Epic Game Store, Xbox One, and Xbox Series X/S on 18 January 2024. Its release marked the first Prince of Persia title in 13 years, following Prince of Persia: The Forgotten Sands (2010). At launch, players discovered one character’s dialogue was generated using text-to-speech software; Ubisoft said this was placeholder audio and that it would be replaced in a future patch. It was released for Windows via Steam on 8 August 2024. Ubisoft Da Nang developed a mobile port of the game, which released on April 14, 2025, for iOS and Android. A free trial of the game, in which an in-app purchase could be used to unlock the full version, was also released.

Ubisoft extensively supported the game following its launch. In 2024, character outfits based on The Rogue Prince of Persia and the 2008 Prince of Persia reboot were released. More accessibility features, such as the ability for players to perform multi-directional parries; game modes introducing permadeath, speedrunning, and boss rush; and new gameplay challenges, were added to the game. A paid expansion titled Mask of Darkness, which introduces a new biome named Radjen's Mind Palace and several new enemy types and traps, was released on 17 September 2024. The expansion's story runs concurrently with the main game. The expansion was the last content release for The Lost Crown; In October 2024, Ubisoft confirmed reports a planned sequel was rejected and that the development team was disbanded and its members moved to other projects.

== Reception ==
Reception

Aggregate scores
Aggregator	Score
Metacritic	(NS) 88/100 (PC) 84/100 (PS5) 86/100 (XSX) 87/100 (iOS) 80/100
OpenCritic	96% recommend

Review scores
Publication	Score
Eurogamer	4/5
Game Informer	9.5/10
GameSpot	9/10
GamesRadar+	4/5
IGN	8/10
PC Gamer (US)	72/100
Pocket Gamer	3.5/5
The Guardian	4/5
VG247	4/5

=== Critical reception ===
Prince of Persia: The Lost Crown received "generally favorable" reviews from critics for all versions of the game, according to review aggregator website Metacritic. OpenCritic determined 96% of critics recommended it. Several critics described The Lost Crown as a successful return to the franchise after an extended hiatus, and ranked it among the genre's best games.

The map design was frequently praised for its complexity; critics noted the maps are filled with shortcuts and interconnected rooms. Christian Donlan from Eurogamer wrote that engaging in the game's traversal and exploration aspects feels like solving puzzles. Wesley LeBlanc from Game Informer liked that the game often rewarded players with tangible gameplay rewards for exploring off the beaten path and completing difficult platforming sections. Steve Watts from GameSpot also felt that the platforming sections can be difficult, demanding players to be precise. Location design was praised because each biome has a unique art design and obstacles. Dom Peppiatt from VG247 compared the map to those from Hollow Knight and Ori and the Blind Forest, describing it as the "real star of the show" and saying it is filled with scenarios that are likely to keep surprising players through its runtime. Mollie Taylor from PC Gamer criticized the game's first half for being unremarkable, noting the second half is significantly more engrossing. The lack of frequent fast travel points and the need to frequently backtrack were criticized. Its accessibility features were praised and the screenshot system was called innovative.

Critics agreed the combat system starts simply but becomes more sophisticated as the game introduces new combos, skills, and enemy types. The boss fights were praised for being challenging because they task players with using all of the tools and skills at their disposal. Phil Hornshaw from IGN applauded the combat system's fluidity, and said its 2D perspective solved some of the gameplay frustrations of the 3D entries. Noting the game's greater emphasis on combat compared to other Metroidvania games, Hornshaw compared Ubisoft's approach to those of Sekiro: Shadows Die Twice and Devil May Cry. Taylor praised the similarities between The Lost Crown and 2D fighting games, and praised the anime-inspired combat cutscenes as "fantastic". Ash Parrish from The Verge praised the game's controls, saying while the game introduces nothing new to the genre, the rhythm of its traversal and combat makes the gameplay experience very satisfying. Several critics said the game has a significant difficulty curve. Parrish said the challenges presented are fair because they force players to master the arsenal of tools, comparing The Lost Crown to Soulslike games. Writing for Pocket Gamer, Will Quick was disappointed Ubisoft recommended playing mobile version of the game using a controller, and criticized its implementation of touch controls.

The game's narrative was frequently criticized for fading into the background as players progress. Watts described Sargon as a compelling character but said supporting characters were barely developed. Hornshaw said the story has some "fascinating" ideas, but they were not fully explored. He also said the game's open structure means some events were triggered out of order, making the narrative confusing at times. Several reviewers said some story threads were missing from the game; Peppiatt described this omission as the game's biggest failing, calling its dialogue "haughty". Joe Donnelly from GamesRadar+ found the story "needlessly complicated and convoluted", and found its storytelling techniques inferior to other Metroidvania games, adding that they disrupt the game's pacing. Taylor, meanwhile, noted key narrative moments are "delivered so awkwardly with little-to-no buildup", adding she cannot resonate or emotionally connect with the story.

=== Sales ===
Prince of Persia: The Lost Crown was the fourth best-selling video game in the UK during its launch week, and the 13th best-selling game in the US in January 2026. It failed to meet Ubisoft's sales expectations. An associate marketing director at Ubisoft said the game had sold 1.3 million units in its first year since release. It had attracted two million players by May 2025, and over three million players by September 2025. More than one million players had downloaded the mobile version of the game.

=== Awards and nominations ===
Accolades for Prince of Persia: The Lost Crown
Year	Award	Category	Result	Ref.
2024	15th Hollywood Music in Media Awards	Original Score – Video Game (Console & PC)	Nominated	
2024	Golden Joystick Awards	Console Game of the Year	Nominated	
2024	The Game Awards 2024	Innovation in Accessibility	Won	
2024	The Game Awards 2024	Best Action/Adventure Game	Nominated	
2025	14th New York Game Awards	NYC GWB Award for Best DLC (Mask of Darkness)	Nominated	
2025	28th Annual D.I.C.E. Awards	Adventure Game of the Year	Nominated	
2025	21st British Academy Games Awards	Animation	Longlisted	
2025	Pégases 2025	Best Accessibility	Won	
2025	Pégases 2025	Best Game Design	Won	
2025	Pégases 2025	Best Sound	Won	
2025	Pégases 2025	Best Video Game	Won	
