= Gareth Coker =

British composer (born 1984)

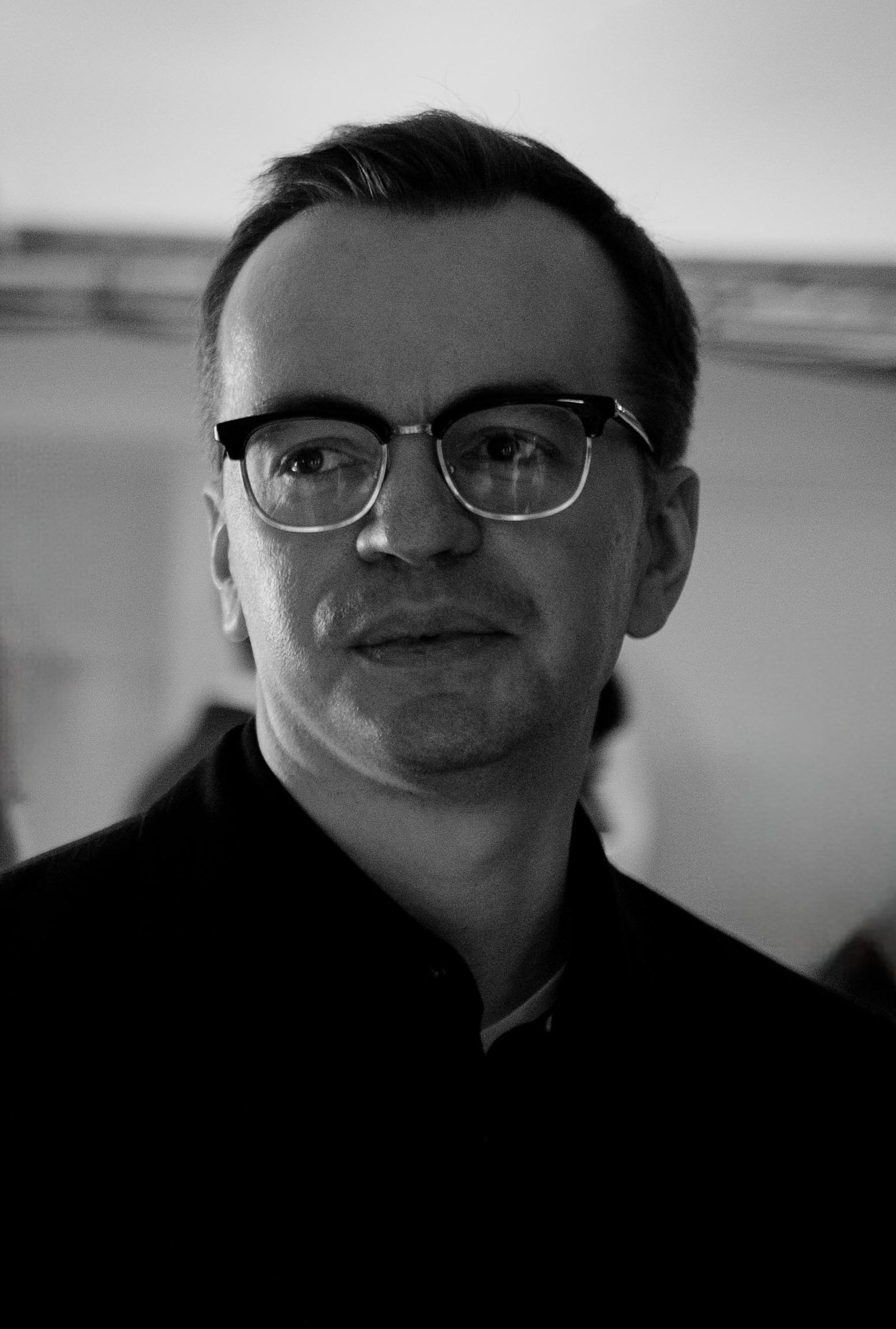
- Coker in 2022

Background information
- Born: 7 May 1984 (age 42); United Kingdom
- Genres: Video game music; classical; electronic; film score
- Occupation: Composer
- Years active: 2009–present
- Labels: Kid Katana Records; Materia Collective
- Website: gareth-coker.net

Gareth Coker (born 7 May 1984) is a British composer. He has composed work for video games, including Ori and the Blind Forest (2015), Ori and the Will of the Wisps (2020), Ark: Survival Evolved (2017), Ark: Survival Ascended (2020), Halo Infinite (2021), Prince of Persia: The Lost Crown (2024), Minecraft and No Rest for the Wicked.

== Life and career ==
Gareth Coker learned the piano at an early age. In school, he joined the orchestra and a jazz band and later studied at the Royal Academy of Music, pursuing a major in musical composition. He traveled and lived abroad in Japan for three years, where he taught English and studied various ethnic instruments. He later moved to Los Angeles, where he juggled between composing for video games and the University of Southern California's film scoring program. Coker cites Alan Silvestri's score for Forrest Gump and Star Wars: X-Wing vs. TIE Fighter as inspirations to becoming a composer.

=== Ori and the Blind Forest ===
In 2011, Coker composed the accompanying music to the game's prototype after studio director Thomas Mahler had stumbled upon his work. Speaking about the game's musical approach, Coker was given free rein by Moon Studios to experiment with the music and scored the game mainly based on the visuals. He worked with the idea of using instruments that would represent the area. For example, using wood-based percussion instruments for the Ginso Tree area or winds in the Forlorn Ruins. He also worked closely with the game's programmers to balance the pacing and timing of the music. Coker recorded the score at Ocean Way Nashville Recording Studios with the Nashville Studio Orchestra.

The musical score had a positive feedback from critics and fans, garnering nominations for several industry awards, including a BAFTA Game Award for Best Music, as well as a win for Outstanding Achievement in Original Music Composition at the 19th Annual D.I.C.E. Awards. Kirk Hamilton of Kotaku appreciated the score's orchestral approach, comparing it to the works of Joe Hisaishi on the Studio Ghibli films. Yahoo's Ben Silverman called it "a wonderful score" and recalled how it was akin to the score of Howl's Moving Castle.

=== Ori and the Will of the Wisps ===
Coker continued his collaboration with Moon Studios in the sequel to Ori and the Blind Forest, Ori and the Will of the Wisps. Like with the first game, Coker "worked closely with the entire team over the course of the games' development, studying the story beats, looking at art assets, and watching how people play the game to make sure everything fit perfectly". Since the sequel is significantly larger in scale, with more characters and character arcs, Coker was able to further develop the musical identity: "Obviously it's more work, but even though it's more work it actually kinda fleshed things out automatically for me because I had more themes to work with, so I actually felt less limited this time around".

As with the first game's music, Coker's score for Will of the Wisps gained wide praise and recognition from award bodies like the SXSW Award, Ivor Novello Award, the D.I.C.E. Awards, and The Game Awards.

=== ARK: Survival Evolved ===
In 2015, Coker was brought on by Studio Wildcard to compose the music for Ark: Survival Evolved. His first track became the main theme for the game. "...it ticked several boxes for Studio Wildcard, who had essentially given me an open brief and also said that they didn't want it to sound like John Williams' Jurassic Park. It was important for them to have a recognizable main theme and to help evoke a sense of adventure with an element of strife and survival".

Much of the score was recorded with the Philharmonia Orchestra in Abbey Road Studios. He also attributes the success of the recording sessions to his additional eyes and ears, Zach Lemmon, and his conductor, Alexander Rudd.

Coker utilized many ethnic instruments for his score: "Each biome has its own unique instruments and characteristics, for example, the swamp makes heavy use of the didgeridoo, the mountains make use of various ethnic wind instruments, but the orchestra can help unify things, and also give the 'epic' feel that the majority of players are expecting". The score for Ark was nominated for a GoldSpirit Award in 2017, and a Jerry Goldsmith Award in 2018.

=== Minecraft Expansions ===
Coker contributed to the music of Minecraft through the Minecraft Mythology expansions, of which include that of Chinese, Greek, Egyptian and Norse. For the Chinese Mythology expansion, Coker had personal experience with learning Chinese culture: "Having lived in Japan, China was never far away for a quick trip, and I've always been fascinated by Asian music, so a lot of the research was already done". To make this feel like a blend of both worlds, Coker focused on using solo instruments from the region, such as erhu, dizi, hulusi and xiao, and then limited himself (mostly) to the more traditional Chinese harmony and scales.

For the Greek Mythology expansion, Coker referred to the limited records of ancient Greek instruments, such as the lyra, psaltery, and pipes. To further immerse the listener into the world of ancient Greece, he used the gods as inspiration for the soundscape. "So for Poseidon, I'd focus on making the track sound like it was 'underwater', as Poseidon is the God of the Sea".

Across the mythologies, Coker had the opportunity to work with renowned musicians; among them is Rachel Nesvig, who specializes in the Norwegian Hardanger Fiddle, Karen Han, who specializes in erhu, and Kristin Naigus, who plays iconic wind instruments from different cultures. He also wrote the music for the Battle, Tumble, and Glide mini-games as well as the Pirates of the Caribbean expansion.

=== Immortals Fenyx Rising ===
Coker's work for Minecraft's Greek Mythology expansion pack caught the eye of Ubisoft: "...they used my soundtrack for Minecraft: Greek Mythology as temporary music. I think it ended up working, and they were like, 'Maybe we should contact the composer'".

The soundtrack as a whole is a mix of the orchestral sound, and the esoteric, non-orchestral elements for the magical/mythological aspect. Additionally, Coker commissioned instruments that were handcrafted and shipped across the Atlantic from Greece.

For the expansion of Immortals Fenyx Rising, Eastern Realms DLC, Coker included Chinese instruments into the soundscape. He received guidance from Ubisoft Chengdu, who provided history lessons on Chinese instruments and Chinese music in general. The resultant soundtrack is a rich blend of orchestral and Chinese elements, but does not go for an authentic experience. Rather, it is made to feel like a unique experience that can be recognized as Coker's style in writing.

=== Halo Infinite ===
Coker worked alongside Joel Corelitz and Curtis Schweitzer on the soundtrack for Halo Infinite. In contrast to previous work, "The challenge was that Halo is the first time I'm stepping into someone else's creation, so it's been about learning the vocabulary and understanding why people like the original Halo music in particular".

The original Halo score, composed by Martin O'Donnell and Michael Salvatori, is deeply ingrained in the series' identity. Coker, Corelitz, and Schweitzer's jobs were to balance between honoring this legacy and introducing their own creative vision.

Coker pointed out the importance of silence and space in the soundtrack. "As opposed to a game like Doom Eternal, where the Slayer moves at an intense pace mowing down demons to filthy djent riffs, the reaction NPCs have when they see Master Chief arriving on the battlefield is in and of itself a prompt to let subtler music do heavier lifting". The score was nominated for a BAFTA in 2022.

=== Mario + Rabbids Sparks of Hope ===
Coker was brought on to the score for Mario + Rabbids Sparks of Hope, along with composers Yoko Shimomura and Grant Kirkhope. "The three talents were tactically deployed across the score by audio director Romain Brillaud, bringing different orchestral and electronic sensibilities to the game... Coker helped bring new colours and emotions to specific settings in the game as well as some boss fights, touching on styles including French impressionism to enrich the score".

Wired heralded the resultant work as "...one of the most ambitious video game soundtracks released in recent years, fusing elements of Japanese RPGs and '90s film scores with the eccentricity you'd expect to hear in a Mario or Rayman game". Amongst many plaudits, the score won the Ivor Novello Award for Best Game Soundtrack in 2023.

=== Prince of Persia: The Lost Crown ===
Coker was brought on with Iranian composer Mentrix for Prince of Persia: The Lost Crown. Coker focused on creating character themes and an intense musical style largely focusing on the cinematics and boss fights with his writing. He emphasizes the importance of thematic melodies for characters, particularly protagonists and antagonists. He highlights the unique blend of various musical elements in the game's soundtrack, including a combination of synths, guitars, Persian instruments, and a 70-piece orchestra. "Between Mentrix and myself, we cover a lot of ground both aesthetically and emotionally, and that is definitely reflected in the game's score".

=== Absolum ===
Coker was brought on to compose for Absolum, a rogue-like beat-em-up from Guard Crush Games and Dotemu. For the game's boss themes, he enlisted guest composers Mick Gordon, Yuka Kitamura, and Motoi Sakuraba. Throughout development, the team provided Coker with full access to the game, enabling him to tailor the music to each area’s tempo and pacing. He credits this support for giving him the time and creative freedom needed to establish Absolum’s distinctive and instantly recognizable musical identity. The soundtrack spans four distinct biomes, each with its own sonic signature shaped by varied genres and instrumentation. It also features five signature boss themes, three of which were written by Gordon ("The Underking"), Kitamura ("Morta Mima"), and Sakuraba ("The Cosmic Beast"). Approximately 60% of the music was recorded with a 65-piece orchestra at Vienna Synchron Stage. Select tracks feature solo performances by Kristin Naigus (woodwinds), Cremaine Booker (cello), and Rachel Hardy (vocals). In the Absolum Composer Diary, Coker emphasized the challenge and importance of creating a sound players would uniquely associate with Absolum. The soundtrack is praised for its stylistic breadth and inventive approach to character and boss themes, elevated by the contributions of these esteemed guest composers and soloists.

== Awards ==
| Work | Year | Award | Note | Ref. |
|---|---|---|---|---|
| Ori and the Blind Forest | 2015 | Golden Joystick Award for Best Audio | Won | |
| Ori and the Blind Forest | 2015 | HMMA Award for Best Original Score - Video Game | Nominated | |
| Ori and the Blind Forest | 2016 | D.I.C.E. Award for Outstanding Achievement in Original Music Composition | Won | |
| Ori and the Blind Forest | 2016 | BAFTA Game Award for Best Music | Nominated | |
| Ori and the Blind Forest | 2016 | SXSW Gaming Award for Excellence in Score | Won | |
| Ori and the Will of the Wisps | 2020 | The Game Award for Best Score and Music | Nominated | |
| Ori and the Will of the Wisps | 2021 | Ivor Novello Award for Best Original Video Game Score | Won | |
| Ori and the Will of the Wisps | 2021 | The IFMCA Award for Best Original Score for a Video Game or Interactive Media | Nominated | |
| Ori and the Will of the Wisps | 2021 | D.I.C.E. Award for Outstanding Achievement in Original Music Composition | Nominated | |
| Ori and the Will of the Wisps | 2021 | SXSW Gaming Award for Excellence in Score | Won | |
| Ori and the Will of the Wisps | 2021 | BAFTA Game Award for Best Music | Nominated | |
| ARK: Survival Evolved | 2017 | GoldSpirit Award for Best original video game score | Nominated | |
| ARK: Survival Evolved | 2018 | Jerry Goldsmith Award for Best Original Score for a Videogame | Nominated | |
| ARK: Genesis - Part 2 | 2022 | IFMCA for Best Original Score for a Video Game or Interactive Media | Nominated | |
| Halo Infinite | 2022 | BAFTA for best music w/ Joel Corelitz and Curtis Schhweitzer | Nominated | |
| Mario + Rabbids: Sparks of Hope | 2023 | Ivor Novello Award for Best Original Video Game Score w/ Yôko Shimomura and Grant Kirkhope | Won | |
| Mario + Rabbids: Sparks of Hope | 2023 | IFMCA for Best Original Score for a Video Game or Interactive Media w/ Yôko Shimomura and Grant Kirkhope | Nominated | |
| Mario + Rabbids: Sparks of Hope | 2023 | HMMA for Best Original Score - Video Game w/ Grant Kirkhope | Nominated | |
| Mario + Rabbids: Sparks of Hope | 2023 | NAVGTR for Song Collection w/ Yôko Shimomura and Grant Kirkhope | Nominated | |
| Mario + Rabbids: Sparks of Hope | 2023 | GANG Award for Best Original Soundtrack w/ Yôko Shimomura and Grant Kirkhope | Nominated | |
| Mario + Rabbids: Sparks of Hope | 2023 | GANG Award for Music of the Year w/ Yôko Shimomura and Grant Kirkhope | Nominated | |

== Works ==
Video games
| Year | Title | Developer | Notes |
|---|---|---|---|
| 2011 | inMomentum | Digital Arrow | |
| 2012 | Primal Carnage | Lukewarm Media | |
| 2015 | Ori and the Blind Forest | Moon Studios | |
| 2015 | The Mean Greens - Plastic Warfare | Code Headquarters | |
| 2016 | The Unspoken | Insomniac Games | |
| 2016 | Minecraft | Mojang & 4J Studios | Expansion Packs: Chinese Mythology, Egyptian Mythology, Greek Mythology, Norse Mythology, Battle & Tumble, Pirates of the Caribbean |
| 2017 | Ark: Survival Evolved | Studio Wildcard | |
| 2019 | Darksiders Genesis | Airship Syndicate | |
| 2020 | Ori and the Will of the Wisps | Moon Studios | |
| 2020 | Dota 2 | Valve | The International 10 music pack |
| 2020 | Immortals Fenyx Rising | Ubisoft Quebec | |
| 2020 | Rushdown Revolt | Vortex Games | with Alessandro Clemente (a.k.a Aless) |
| 2021 | Ruined King: A League of Legends Story | Airship Syndicate | |
| 2021 | Halo Infinite | 343 Industries | Composed with Curtis Schweitzer and Joel Corelitz |
| 2022 | Mario + Rabbids Sparks of Hope | Ubisoft Paris; Ubisoft Milan | Alongside Grant Kirkhope and Yoko Shimomura |
| 2022 | Arknights | Hypergryph | Dorothy's Vision, Fire Within the Sand and Mizuki & Caerula Arbor events |
| 2023 | Ark: Survival Ascended | Studio Wildcard | |
| 2023 | The Mageseeker: A League of Legends Story | Digital Sun | |
| 2023 | Wayfinder | Airship Syndicate | |
| 2024 | Prince of Persia: The Lost Crown | Ubisoft Montpellier | Composed with Mentrix |
| 2024 | Ark II | Studio Wildcard | |
| 2025 | Absolum | Dotemu, Guard Crush Games | With guest composers: Mick Gordon, Yuka Kitamura, Motoi Sakuraba |
| 2025 | ARK: Lost Colony | Studio Wildcard | |
| 2026 | Arknights: Endfield | Hypergryph, Mountain Contour | Main contributor on the "Zeroth Directive Original Soundtrack" vol. 1 and contributor on vol. 2 |
| TBA | No Rest for the Wicked | Moon Studios | Composed with Jason Graves |

Films and TV
| Year | Title | Notes |
|---|---|---|
| 2009 | Nameless | |
| 2010 | Unwound | |
| 2010 | Ellen | |
| 2010 | You Kill Me | |
| 2010 | What to Bring to America | |
| 2010 | The Incident | |
| 2010 | Laugh and Die | |
| 2010 | Homeland | |
| 2010 | George's 40th Birthday | |
| 2011 | Buried Alive | |
| 2011 | Dysteria | |
| 2011 | Upon Release | |
| 2011 | Cab 57 | |
| 2011 | Waking Up | |
| 2011 | The Silence Inside Us | |
| 2011 | I Am Rupert Caldwell | |
| 2011 | Good Intentions | |
| 2011 | August's Claim | |
| 2012 | Call to Arms | |
| 2012 | All Up to You | |
| 2012 | Haven's Point | |
| 2012 | Dog-Eared | |
| 2013 | Veritasium | 1 episode |
| 2013 | Rise | |
| 2013 | Diary of a Teenage Nobody | 1 episode |
| 2013 | The Plagiarist's Game | |
| 2013 | Billy in Motion | |
| 2013 | Verax | |
| 2013 | United Grand Lodge of Queensland Grand Installation | |
| 2013 | Dark Power | |
| 2013 | Where the Sky Is Born | |
| 2014 | Thrilling Contradictions | |
| 2014 | Rush | |
| 2015 | Recoil | |
| 2015 | The Sweet Taste of Redemption | |
| 2015 | Let Go | |
| 2016 | Emma's Chance | |
| 2016 | Mandroid | |
| 2017 | The Labyrinth | |
| 2017 | Resistance is Life | |
| 2017 | Moving Art | 1 episode |
| 2018 | Level Up Norge | 3 episodes |
| 2018 | Buoyancy | |
| 2018 | The Price | |
| 2019 | Full Moon | |
| 2019 | The Teleios Act | |
| 2024 | Ark: The Animated Series | |
