= Azhdaha =

Mythical winged serpent in Iranian mythology

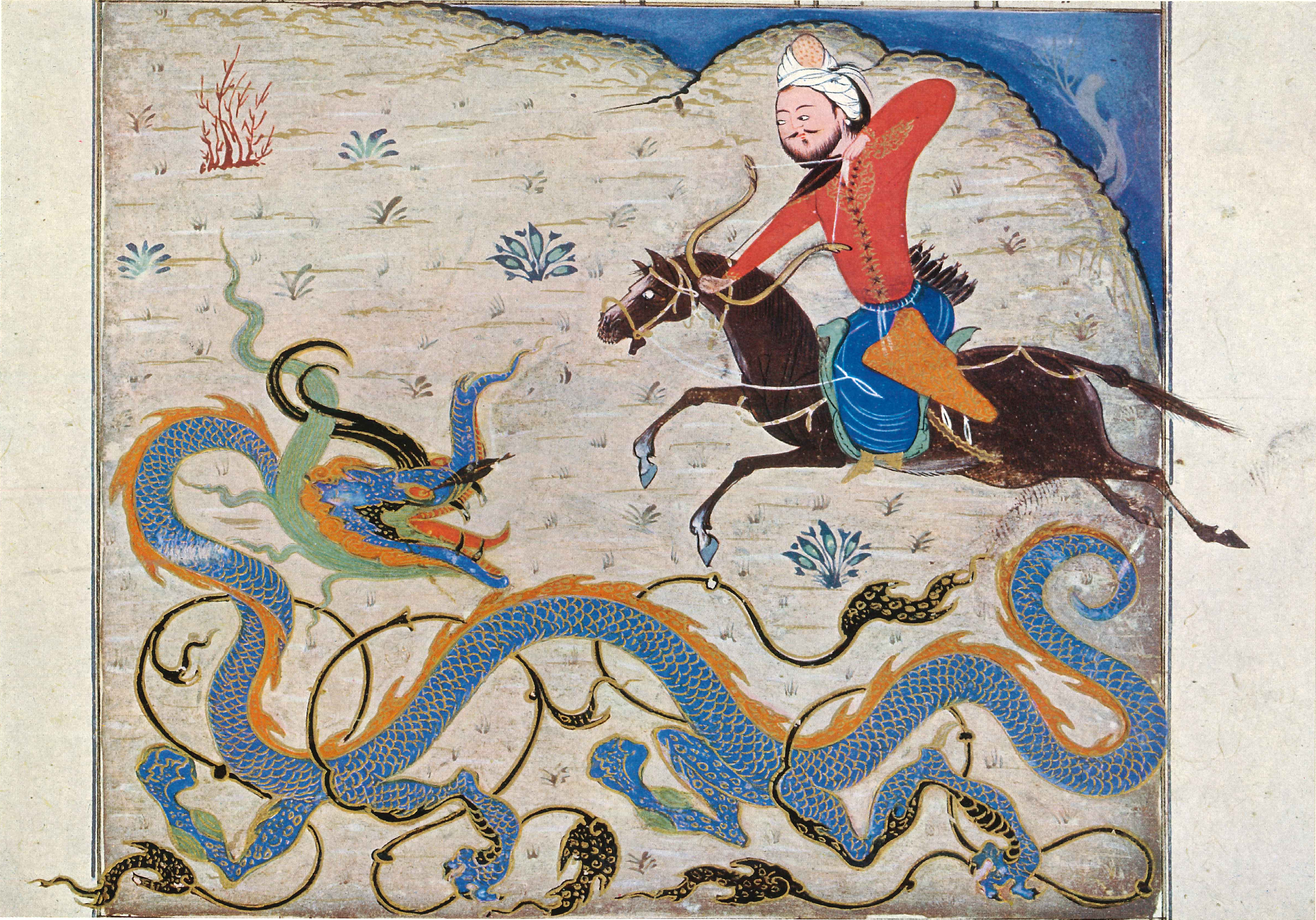
- Illustration of the Sasanian king Bahram V fighting an Azhdahā in the Shahnameh

Creature information
- Grouping: Mythical creature
- Folklore: Persian mythology

Origin
- Country: Ancient Iran

The azhdaha, azhdahak, ezhdeha (Persian: اژدها) or azhdar (اژدر) is a mythical creature in Iranian mythology, roughly equivalent to the dragon. In Persian literature, they are depicted as gigantic, winged serpents that live in the air, in the sea, or on the earth. According to tradition, azhdaha have huge bodies, fierce faces, bright eyes, and wide mouths with many teeth. The azhdaha are principally discussed in Sad dar-e nathr and sad dar-e Bondahesh, Shahnameh and Garshaspnameh.

== Descriptions ==
The azhdaha has its origins in Indo-Iranian mythology, with early written references recorded in the Avestan period. In the Shahnameh, the national epic of Greater Iran, azhdaha appear in several stories, where they are slain by heroes such as Sām, Rostam, Esfandiar, Bahram V (Gur).

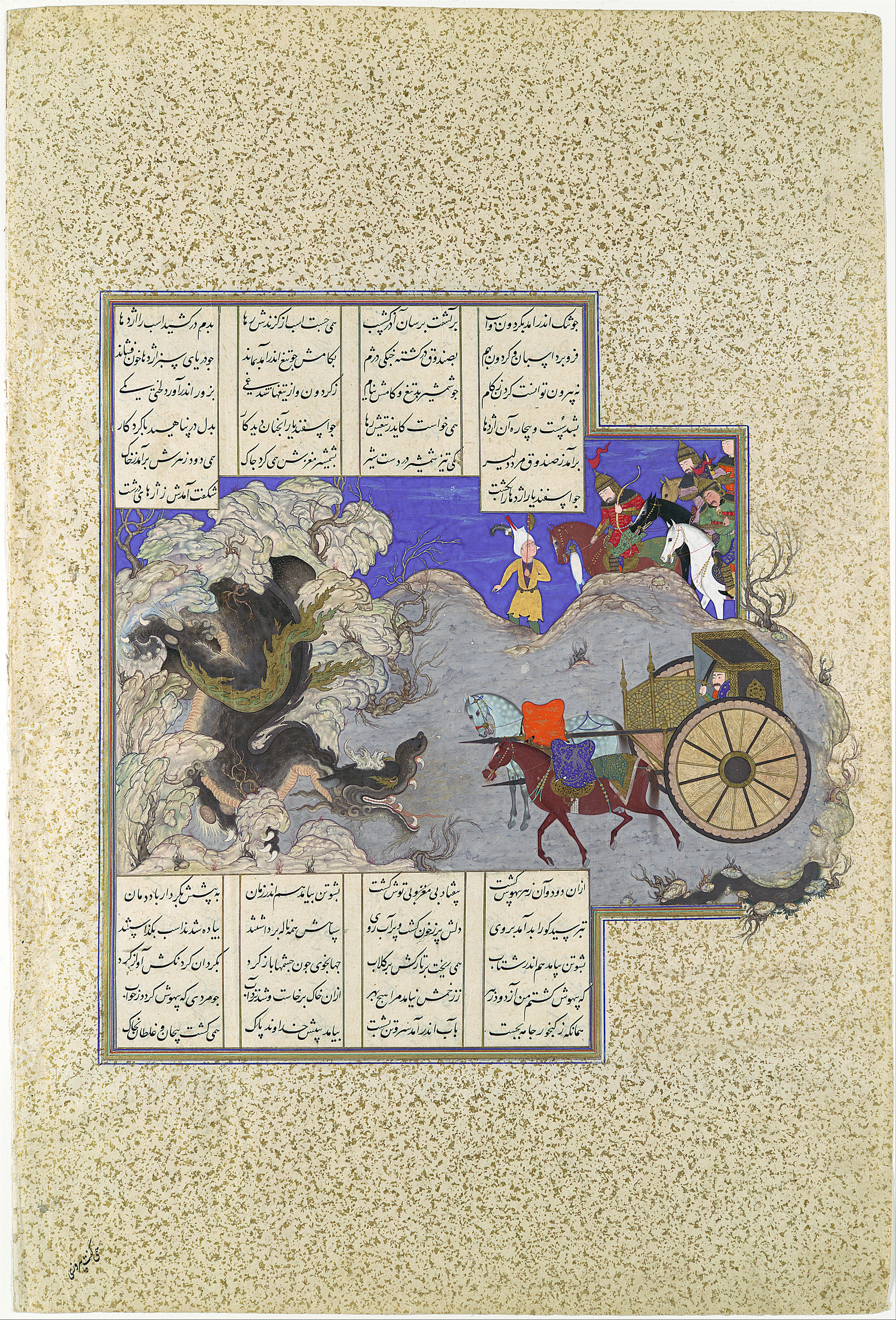
Esfandiyar slays an Azhdaha in his third course - Shahnameh of Shah Tahmasp

In Islamic accounts, the azhdaha was a mundane snake that had grown large and destructive, and had displeased God. In Ajāyeb ul-Makhlooghāt (1160 AD), Mohammad b. Mahmoud b. Ahmad-e Tusi describes azhdaha as normal snakes that had lived for at least 100 years, had grown longer than 30 Gazes (approximately a meter), and were cast by God into the sea as punishment for harassing other creatures. In the sea, they would grow to 10,000 Gazes or more, develop a pair of fin-like wings, and cause the waves with their movements. According to this account, anyone who eats the heart of an azhdaha would gain "courage and bravery", while azhdaha skins would heal "the wound of love", and their heads, if buried, would fertilise the earth.

In the Nuzhat al-Qulub (1339–1340 AD), which was considerably influenced by the Ajayeb ul-Makhlooghaat, author and historian Hamdallah Mustawfi describes the azhdaha as being terrible in appearance, with flaming eyes, a wide mouth, and a body of enormous length. Like Ahmad-e-Tusi, he also maintains that the dragon was at first a serpent, and it was only after it became more than thirty yards long that it came to be called an azhdaha. After the azhdaha was cast into the sea by God for terrorizing the people on land, it developed fins and continued to grow, causing damage in the sea. After it was killed, its body was cast up on the shore to provide food for the inhabitants of the Land of Gog and Magog.

== In popular culture ==
=== Video games ===
- Azdaha is a major boss in the main quest of Prince of Persia: The Lost Crown, depicted as an eternally trapped serpent
- Azdaha is a dragon weekly boss in Genshin Impact

== See also ==
- Zahhak
