= Azhdaha (Genshin Impact) =

- Genshin Impact character
- Official portrait
- First game: Genshin Impact (2021)
- Voiced by: EN: Matthew Greenbaum; ZH: Liu Beichen; JA: Kōhei Kiyasu

In-universe information
- Species: Dragon

Azhdaha (/ˈeɪʒdəhə/ AYZH-də-hə; Chinese: 若陀龙王; pinyin: Ruò tuó lóngwáng) is a boss character in the video game Genshin Impact, developed by miHoYo. Azhdaha is an ancient elemental lifeform from the fictional nation of Liyue who once fought alongside the nation's ruler Zhongli, who granted him sight and entered into a contract with him to protect humanity. However, after being gradually driven into a bestial state by centuries of what is referred to in-game as "erosion", Azhdaha was ultimately sealed by Zhongli beneath an ancient tree in Liyue. He officially debuted as a boss in version 1.5 of the game in 2021.

Development of Azhdaha began during the planning stages before Genshin Impact was released, while production commenced after the release and lasted approximately six months. The central aim of his design was to integrate the boss into the game's narrative, further develop Zhongli's characterization, and explore the concept of erosion and the conflict between humanity and nature. His appearance deliberately avoided conventional depictions of the Chinese and European dragon, instead adopting the form of a crocodile-like quadrupedal dragon. His physique drew inspiration from the alligator snapping turtle, Komodo dragon, and stegosaurus. Details such as Geo (stone) crystals and entwined vegetation were used to establish a visual progression between Azhdaha and the similar-looking Geovishaps, reflecting their different stages of growth. The boss encounter was designed around interactions with shields as well as reactions via the game's system of elemental magic. During battle, Azhdaha can absorb different elements, altering his attack patterns and the strategies needed to defeat him.

Azhdaha's background theme songs, "Ode to Azhdaha" and "Rage Beneath the Mountains", were among the first pieces in the game to feature lyrics in the Chinese language. Written in a style imitating the Chu Ci anthology of Chinese poetry, the lyrics combine traditional Chinese instruments such as the erhu and bamboo flute with Western orchestral music and modern instruments such as the electric guitar, conveying Azhdaha's deep hatred and lingering resentment after a thousand years of imprisonment. miHoYo also detailed the composition process in a behind-the-scenes video. Following Azhdaha's release, the character received widespread discussion among critics and players. Commentators praised his characterization as an attempt to tell a Chinese story to a global audience. His boss encounter was also praised for features including its high damage output, generous reaction windows, and elemental mechanics that test players' abilities, although some commentators criticized its heavy reliance on characters capable of generating shields.

== Design ==
The developers had planned Azhdaha as a boss character before the release of Genshin Impact, but production did not begin until version 1.1. The initial inspiration came from a name which was derived from a creature in Iranian mythology of the same name. The name "Azhdaha" also carries the implication of something that has remained hidden for a long time but will eventually awaken, foreshadowing the immense threat concealed within the game's world. The central aim of the design was to integrate the boss into the game's narrative, strengthen the player experience, and closely connect the encounter with its environment and story. The team decided to present Azhdaha's story in Zhongli's Story Quest, focusing on erosion, the conflict between humanity and nature, and the emotions of inorganic beings. Through these themes, the story depicts humanity and nature as both interdependent and opposed to one another. Azhdaha's appearance was also intended to further develop Zhongli's characterization by portraying the personal and public losses and erosion he endured as the Geo Archon. This was designed to allow the player character, the Traveler, to empathize with him and recognize that their own search for their lost sibling would similarly be long but not without a trail to follow.

In designing Azhdaha's appearance, the team deliberately avoided conventional European and Chinese depictions of dragons, instead choosing a more archaic and unconventional "crocodilian quadrupedal dragon" design. Its inspiration can be traced to the diverse representations of dragons found in China from the Shang and Zhou dynasties through the Han dynasty, including crocodile-shaped jade artifacts from the Tomb of Fu Hao and Han dynasty pictorial bricks. The team established two guiding principles for the design: Azhdaha had to be visually distinct from both Stormterror Dvalin (who appeared in the European-inspired area of Mondstadt) and Zhongli's dragon form, while also embodying Liyue's association with the Geo element. To achieve this, the team drew upon the silhouettes and movements of alligator snapping turtles and Komodo dragons. To improve the sense of impact during combat and prevent issues of collision, they shortened his limbs and raised his tail, ultimately using the physique of a Stegosaurus as a reference to create a heavy and massive appearance. In terms of finer details, Azhdaha was designed to represent a further stage of growth beyond the similar-looking Geovishap enemies, who share features such as Geo crystals, entwined vegetation, and Liyue-style rock patterns. His tail was designed to resemble a tree seen at the in-game location of Nantianmen, while plant motifs were extended across his body through features including leg armor textured like tree bark and horns resembling teakwood, reflecting his prolonged imprisonment. To accommodate development across multiple platforms, the model's polygon count was kept below sixty thousand, with additional detail conveyed through adjustments to its surface normals and the rendering of shadows.

=== Battle ===
For the boss fight itself, the team established two central gameplay concepts: interaction with shields and a mechanic through which Azhdaha dynamically acquires additional elemental powers through the Geo elemental reaction known as Crystallize. The team initially considered twelve combinations involving the Hydro, Pyro, Cryo, and Electro elements, but ultimately adopted four combinations using these four elements due to considerations involving color, visual effects, and performance. Each element was designed to require a different combat strategy: Pyro expands the range of Azhdaha's attacks, Hydro emphasizes long-range projectiles, Cryo increases Azhdaha's attack frequency, and Electro tests the player's timing when evading attacks. To address the difficulty of clearly displaying elemental attributes across Azhdaha's entire body, the team used color configurations that remained distinguishable when combined with various gameplay effects, including shields and skill-based elemental reactions. For the animations, the team referenced reptiles and amphibians when designing movements such as burrowing underground and attacks that made the tail the focal point. These animations were accompanied by music composed by Chen Yupeng to heighten the encounter's oppressive atmosphere, while controllers developed by the technical art team were used to enhance its finer details. The visual effects combined stone pillars with magical formations to convey the force of Azhdaha's imprisonment and escape. His multi-elemental abilities were differentiated through their forms and movement, while the team developed new technology to overcome performance limitations during the battle's full-screen lightning strikes. Transitions between phases were depicted through changes to Azhdaha's body color, environmental crystals, lighting, and particle effects, creating multiple layers of visual detail. The team described Azhdaha's creation as being grounded in Chinese civilization while incorporating culturally resonant symbols.

The boss encounter's background themes, "Ode to Azhdaha" and "Rage Beneath the Mountains", were among the first pieces in the game to feature lyrics in Chinese. Written in imitation of the Chu Ci style, the lyrics were intended to evoke both familiarity and estrangement, conveying the profound hatred and lingering resentment that Azhdaha developed after a millennium of imprisonment, abandonment and alienation, rather than mere bitterness over his defeat. The compositions combine traditional Chinese instruments such as the erhu and bamboo flute with Western instruments such as the electric guitar. They also incorporate two lines modeled after the style of the Chu Ci which can be traced to verses from the ancient Chinese poem Li Sao.

=== Voice acting ===
Azhdaha is voiced in Japanese by Kōhei Kiyasu. In an interview, Kiyasu stated that he regarded the purity of Azhdaha's human identity, Kun Jun, as central to his portrayal of the character. Kun Jun repeatedly touches stones because he does not understand them, reflecting his innocent yet persistent nature. In portraying Azhdaha, meanwhile, Kiyasu sought to add subtle layers beyond the character's rough voice so that he would not come across as an ordinary monster. Kiyasu was particularly careful in establishing the degree of contrast between the two characters of Azhdaha and Kun Jun. Although their voices had to remain distinct, they could not be treated as completely separate because the internal conflicts and circumstances underlying each character differed. In Azhdaha's emotionally charged scenes with Zhongli, Kiyasu deliberately avoided excessive dramatization that might make their relationship feel overly sentimental, instead conveying Azhdaha's final feelings through careful delivery of each word. Overall, he considered Azhdaha a more nuanced character than he had initially expected and hoped that the storyling would deepen players' understanding of both the character and the game's world.

Azhdaha's English voice actor, Matthew Greenbaum, described voicing the character as a highly enjoyable experience. He found Azhdaha more nuanced than he had initially thought. He did not believe that Azhdaha was merely a ferocious monster, but a character possessing deep emotions and considerable complexity. During recording, Greenbaum voiced both Kun Jun and Azhdaha, as Kun Jun is revealed in the story to be a manifestation of Azhdaha's benevolent side. Greenbaum stated that Kun Jun's lines were recorded first, followed by Azhdaha's. He therefore had to establish an appropriate degree of contrast between the two performances: they needed to sound distinct without feeling entirely disconnected, as they represented different aspects of the same being. Greenbaum also highlighted the complicated emotional relationship between Azhdaha and Zhongli. He noted that Azhdaha had originally been Rex Lapis's close friend and comrade, and that the two had once fought together to protect Liyue. Near the end of the story, Azhdaha's benevolent aspect and Zhongli share a quiet conversation without confrontation or overt emotional outpouring. Their tone is so restrained that it sounds as though they might meet again at any time, yet the scene remains emotionally affecting. Greenbaum particularly favored Azhdaha's line, "As the friend of the God of Contracts, this is my final way of honoring our contract," which he believed perfectly conveyed the character's depth.

Azhdaha is voiced in Chinese by Liu Beichen.

== Appearances ==
In the game, Azhdaha is a Geo elemental life-form born in the region of Liyue, and one of the most powerful beings that had existed upon the planet of Teyvat since ancient times. He once fought alongside Morax, the Geo Archon later known as Zhongli, and became an important force under his command. At the time, Azhdaha was blind, so Zhongli granted him sight, allowing him to behold the world. The two then formed a contract requiring Azhdaha to coexist with humanity and refrain from harming people, under penalty of being sealed away once more. Azhdaha subsequently accompanied the Geo Archon in campaigns across Liyue. Over the course of the following centuries, however, Azhdaha gradually succumbed to "erosion". He had once integrated into human society and shared a period of peaceful coexistence with the people of Liyue, but this relationship eventually collapsed as a result of the erosion, leading him to turn against humanity. To protect Liyue's people, Zhongli was ultimately forced to fight his former companion. After defeating Azhdaha, he sealed him beneath the Dragon-Queller, an ancient tree. Azhdaha remained underground for many years, during which vegetation spread across his body, his tail transformed into a great tree at Nantianmen, and his body became integrated with the surrounding plant life. While imprisoned, he developed profound hatred and lingering resentment. These feelings were not merely the result of his defeat or a personal grudge against Zhongli, but arose from being sealed away alive, forced to watch as he was forgotten and gradually alienated from the rest of the world.

In the second act of Zhongli's Story Quest, the Traveler is commissioned to search for several missing miners. Zhongli and Kun Jun join the investigation as experts in geology and minerals, respectively. The group follows the miners' trail from the Chasm, Liyue's mining region, all the way to Nantianmen. During the journey, Kun Jun demonstrates an ability to read the memories contained within rocks, although he appears to have lost part of his own memory and is searching for a "Dragonfall Stone", a material that had been extinct for a century. This arouses Zhongli's suspicions. After reading the memories of a stone tablet near the Dragon-Queller, Kun Jun regains awareness of his true identity. At that moment Zhongli is attacked by an entity called Jiu, but Kun Jun shields him from the blow. The resulting shock weakens the seal, allowing Azhdaha to break free. With the aid of Kun Jun's power, the Traveler and Zhongli defeat Azhdaha and seal him away once more. It is subsequently revealed that, after cracks recently appeared in the seal, Jiu (a manifestation of Azhdaha's malevolence) had lingered near the Dragon-Queller in search of an opportunity to release Azhdaha. At the same time, Azhdaha had not entirely forgotten his contract to protect humanity. His benevolent consciousness possessed Kun Jun, a descendant of a renowned craftsman, and instinctively sought out Zhongli in the hope of preventing the seal from being broken. Kun Jun ultimately shows Jiu Azhdaha's memories of living alongside humanity. Overcome by regret and remorse, Jiu exhausts her strength and is re-sealed together with Azhdaha's malevolent consciousness. After briefly reminiscing with Zhongli, Azhdaha's benevolent consciousness also fades away.

=== Gameplay ===
After completing the second act of Zhongli's story quest, players can unlock the Domain (area) known as "Beneath the Dragon-Queller", where they may defeat Azhdaha once per week to claim rewards. The battle against Azhdaha is divided into three phases. During the first phase, he remains in his initial form and has high resistance to Geo and physical damage. His attacks during this phase primarily consist of close-range strikes and area-of-effect attacks. When his health falls to approximately two-thirds, the second phase begins. He infuses himself with either Hydro or Pyro, retains all of his previous attacks, and gains two additional moves: alternately raising his legs to create shockwaves, and roaring upward to summon projectiles across the battlefield. The final phase begins when his health is reduced to approximately one-third. Azhdaha infuses himself with either Electro or Cryo and gains two further attack patterns: burrowing underground while leaving only his tail exposed and dealing extensive area-of-effect damage around himself, and raising his tail to fire multiple projectiles.

== Promotion ==
On April 16, 2021, miHoYo announced during a promotional livestream for version 1.5 of the game that Azhdaha would be introduced as a boss character. Following the release of that version on April 28, he appeared in the second act of Zhongli's Story Quest. On April 29, miHoYo released a story teaser entitled "Through the Eyes of a Dragon", which recounts how Zhongli (under the title "Rex Lapis") formed a contract with Azhdaha and became his comrade in the distant past. On July 16, miHoYo released a behind-the-scenes video detailing Azhdaha's development process.

== Reception ==
=== Characterization ===
A writer from Chinese gaming site Game Teahouse noted that Azhdaha took six months to develop and represented a significant demonstration of Genshin Impact's design capabilities. According to them, the boss character was significant not only as a technical and artistic breakthrough, but also as evidence of the continued evolution of the Genshin Impact intellectual property, as the development team had begun placing greater emphasis on telling stories that encourage players to reflect. Azhdaha had also been foreshadowed throughout several versions of the game, demonstrating the importance the development team placed on the character. The writer concluded that Azhdaha's creation succeeded in "telling a Chinese story in a global language", reflecting Genshin Impact's efforts and achievements in promoting Chinese culture internationally. Lian Po of 3DMGAME stated that Azhdaha's descent into a "bestial abyss" under the effects of centuries of erosion sharply contrasted with Zhongli's continued adherence to his "divinity", with their confrontation representing a "struggle between the divine and the bestial". During the battle in the story, an Easter egg is triggered when Zhongli's health falls to a critically low level, recalling the warmth of the pair's former relationship.

Azhdaha's battle music also received praise. The writer from Game Teahouse noted that "Ode to Azhdaha" and "Rage Beneath the Mountains" prompted extensive discussion among players because of their lyrics written in imitation of the Chu Ci. The community's widespread interpretation of the lyrics became a topic in its own right and even inspired fan works both within China and overseas. Wang Yifei of Hebei University of Science and Technology stated that the music was designed not only to establish the atmosphere of the battle, but also to perform a narrative function. The piercing orchestral passages represent Azhdaha's loneliness and coldness after a thousand years of imprisonment, while the sorrowful melodies of the erhu recount the tragic transformation of his relationship with Zhongli from close friendship to violent conflict. According to Wang, the music lets players experience the battle as though they were listening to a musical epic spanning thousands of years. Shao Qi of Hubei Minzu University argued that the English subtitles accompanying the lyrics help overseas players understand their meaning, while the combination of traditional Chinese instruments like the erhu and bamboo flute combined with modern instruments such as the electric guitar and bass guitar produce a sense of familiarity, while the archaic style of the Chu Ci simultaneously creates a sense of distance. Foreign players, meanwhile, can understand the emotions conveyed by the music through the narrative context established beforehand and the emotional effects produced by the electronic instruments.

Li Zhenzhao of Guangdong University of Foreign Studies said that the narrative of "Through the Eyes of a Dragon" draws upon the ancient Chinese painting legend "The Finishing Touch" (Chinese: 画龙点睛) but retains only the literary detail of "painting the dragon's eyes", while rewriting both the story's thematic core and its conclusion. The original legend emphasizes that artistic creation must focus on a crucial detail in order to bring a work to life, whereas the game's version instead highlights Zhongli's recognition of Azhdaha's worth and the bond between them. The original ending, in which "two dragons fly away", is likewise replaced with Morax and Azhdaha beginning to travel together as companions. Li categorized this as an adaptation that "retains only the legend's important literary details, while allowing its characters, ending, and even thematic core to be altered", arguing that this approach offers players a fresh interpretation of a familiar story.

=== Combat design ===
Lian Po stated that Azhdaha is distinctive in that, despite being a Geo dragon, he can wield multiple elements, with his attack patterns changing alongside his elemental forms. He praised the battle's design, noting that Azhdaha's high-damage attacks give players "ample time to react", while the wide, fan-shaped attacks used during his Electro form can be flexible avoided via careful positioning. Lian characterized the encounter as a "diagnostic test" for players, assessing not only their characters' statistics but also their understanding of the game's elemental reactions system, the depth of their character roster, and their overall level of investment. He remarked that "players have to start taking things seriously", viewing the battle as evidence that the game's difficulty curve was beginning to rise. Lian particularly praised miHoYo for reducing the difficulty of the version of the battle encountered during the story, allowing most players to complete it without undue difficulty. He contrasted this with the complaints prompted by the excessively difficult story quest against Tartaglia when the latter was introduced as a boss earlier in the game, describing Azhdaha's difficulty as more accommodating to players. Asad Kashif and Kyle Gorges of TheGamer stated that Azhdaha's overall presentation—from the imposing underground arena to the stirring musical score—successfully creates the atmosphere of an epic confrontation, and that the battle itself largely fulfills those expectations. Azhdaha continually tests players with powerful and varied attacks, while his randomized elemental infusions further increase the weekly challenge's complexity and replayability. However, they criticized the encounter's severe reliance on shield-generating characters, arguing that without one, an otherwise challenging and enjoyable battle becomes a deadly and frustrating ordeal.

Sisi Jiang of Kotaku noted that Azhdaha possesses several attacks capable of instantly defeating players and changes his elemental attributes between battles, describing him as one of the game's most fearsome enemies. Bruno Yonezawa of Screen Rant argued that fighting Azhdaha in co-op mode is particularly difficult. During the second and third phases of the battle, Azhdaha infuses himself with different elements. Players struck by these elemental attacks without a shield's protection are marked and continue to take additional elemental damage. In co-op, several party members may be marked simultaneously, allowing the team to be quickly overwhelmed if it lacks a character capable of providing reliable shields. Yonezawa further noted that Azhdaha's health and attack power increase substantially in co-op mode making an encounter that already requires players to balance defense and damage output even more demanding. In addition, Azhdaha gains substantial resistance to the elements he absorbs during the second and third phases. If teammates select their characters poorly and the party's primary damage type matches Azhdaha's current elemental infusion, their damage output will be greatly reduced. Yonezawa concluded that although defeating Azhdaha in co-op mode is not impossible, the combined demands of countering his mechanics, enduring increased numerical pressure, and assembling a suitable team make fighting him in single-player mode the safer and more efficient option.
