= Mentrix =

Iranian-born musician (born 1981)

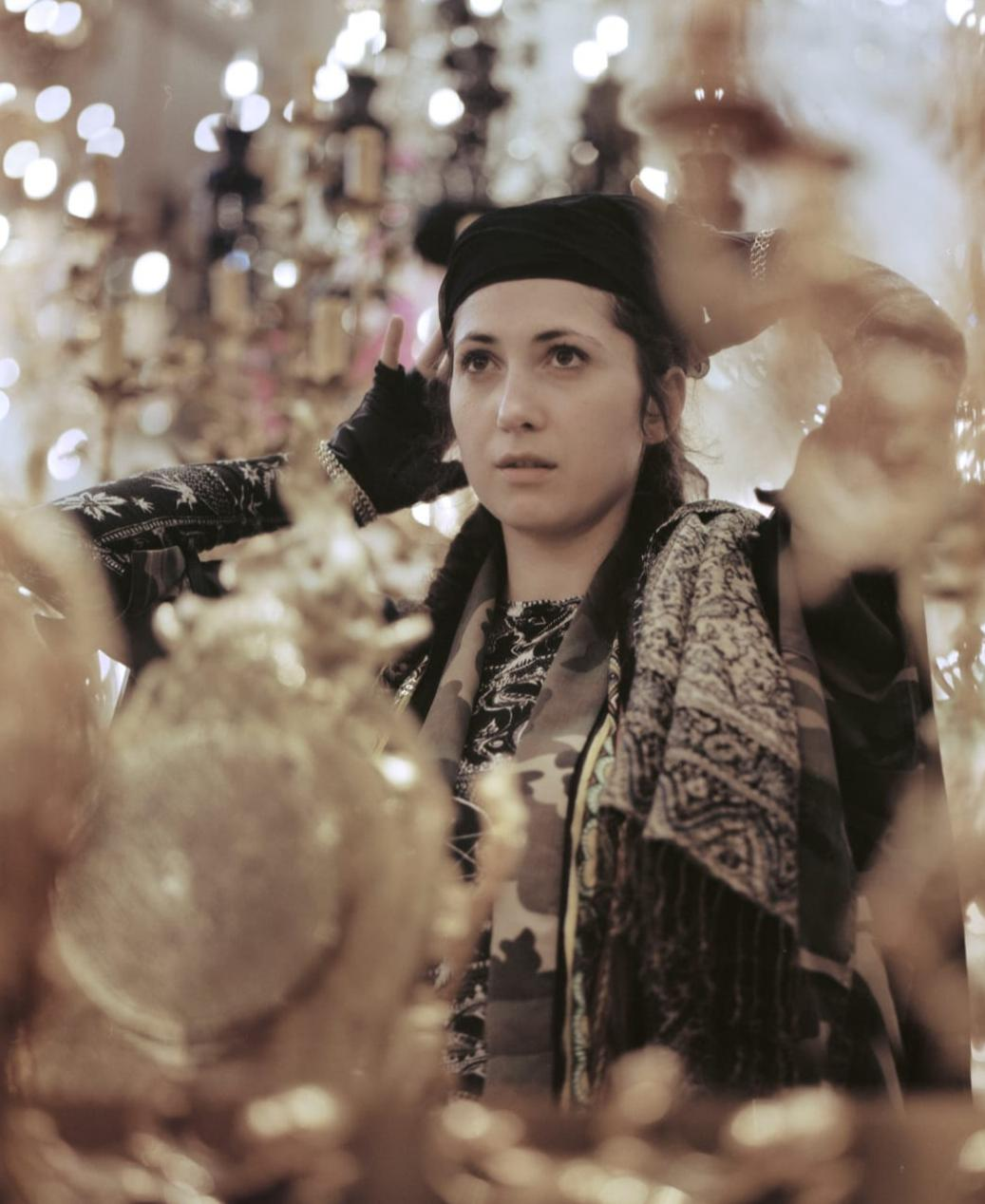
- Mentrix in 2023

Background information
- Birth name: Samar Rad
- Born: 1981 (age 43–44)
- Genres: Electronic, Goth-pop, Iranian, Traditional
- Occupation(s): Musician, Songwriter, Producer, Film producer
- Instrument(s): Voice, Daf, Percussion, Guitar
- Labels: House of Strength, Springstoff

Samar Rad, known professionally as Mentrix, is an Iranian-born musician, songwriter and multidisciplinary artist, currently based in Berlin. Her music often fuses traditional Iranian instruments and vocal styles with electronics.

== Life and career ==
Samar was born in Tehran, Iran, where she lived until she was 8, at the end of the Iran-Iraq war. Thereafter her childhood was divided between France and her country of birth. Her early adult years were spent in Paris, where she attended university, and the UK. It was in the UK that she began to experiment with music, inspired by her Sufi practice. Samar wrote her first song in 2013, in which year she also contributed guest vocals to the Fink album Hard Believer. This was her first credit under the name Mentrix, a name she chose for herself “because I was looking for the female version of [the word] mentor… and I couldn’t really find one.”

In 2015 Samar settled in Berlin, where she began writing and recording for what would be her debut album. She trained with Iranian vocalists in LA and Paris, also teaching herself guitar and Daf, an Iranian framed drum. This instrument helped to form the sound of the record: “I knew I wanted Daf to be at the core.”.

Released in early 2020, My Enemy, My Love was met by positive reviews, with Mojo calling it a “mesmerising debut” and Future Music describing it as an “intoxicating clash of eastern and western cultures.”.

To accompany the album’s singles “Walk” and “Nature”, Samar collaborated with French director Gilles Estève to produce two short films, both filmed in Iran in 2018 and released in 2020.

In 2021 Samar composed a song in Twi language for the German film Borga.

== Prince of Persia: The Lost Crown ==
In June 2023 Mentrix was announced as one of the composers for the latest game in the Ubisoft Prince of Persia series. Prince of Persia: The Lost Crown was released in January 2024. The game also features music by award-winning composer Gareth Coker.

== Discography ==
=== Albums ===
- My Enemy, My Love (House of Strength, 2020)

=== EPs ===
- Men Mix Mentrix (House of Strength, 2020)

=== Singles ===
- "Walk" (House of Strength, 2020)
- "Nature" (House of Strength, 2020)
- "99 Names of God" (House of Strength, 2021)
- "BE MAHSA BE NIKA" (Apranik Records, 2023)

=== with Conscious Summary ===
==== Singles ====
- “If” (Springstoff, 2022)
