= Ori and the Will of the Wisps =

2020 video game

- Developer: Moon Studios
- Publishers: Xbox Game Studios; Iam8bit (Switch)
- Director: Thomas Mahler
- Producer: Błażej Żywiczyński
- Designers: Thomas Mahler; Chris McEntee
- Programmer: Gennadiy Korol
- Artists: Daniel van Leeuwen; Jeremy Gritton
- Writers: Jeremy Gritton; Thomas Mahler
- Composer: Gareth Coker
- Engine: Unity
- Platforms: Windows; Xbox One; Nintendo Switch; Xbox Series X/S
- Release: Windows, Xbox One; March 11, 2020; Nintendo Switch; September 17, 2020; Xbox Series X/S; November 10, 2020
- Genre: Metroidvania
- Mode: Single-player

Ori and the Will of the Wisps is a 2020 Metroidvania video game developed by Moon Studios and published by Xbox Game Studios. Announced during E3 2017, the title is a direct sequel to 2015's Ori and the Blind Forest, and was released in March 2020 for Windows and Xbox One. A Nintendo Switch version was released in September 2020 by Iam8bit, and a version optimized for Xbox Series X/S was released as its launch title in November 2020. The game maintains narrative continuity with Blind Forest, and follows the journey of series' main character Ori in a new region called Niwen.

The game was developed by Moon Studios, a studio based in Vienna with contributors worldwide. The game introduces new melee combat, and its visuals were given an overhaul from the two-dimensional artwork in Blind Forest, to the three-dimensional models played in multilayered backgrounds in Will of the Wisps.

Upon release, Ori and the Will of the Wisps received critical acclaim. Praise directed to the game included the story, characters, visuals, combat, elements of exploration, environments, chase sequences, and soundtrack. It is considered an example of art forms in the video game medium. However, criticism was aimed at technical issues such as frame rate issues and visual bugs, which were largely resolved with a day-one patch.

== Gameplay ==
Ori and the Will of the Wisps is a 2D Metroidvania; a platform game emphasizing exploration, collecting items and upgrades, and backtracking to previously inaccessible areas. The player controls the titular Ori, a white guardian spirit. As Ori, players must jump, climb, glide, and swim between various platforms to solve intricate puzzles. Gameplay unfolds in the form of a Metroidvania, with new abilities and upgrades allowing players to unlock previously inaccessible areas of the map. Some of the foundational gameplay elements were inspired by the Rayman and Metroid franchises.

Unlike its predecessor Blind Forest, Will of the Wisps relies on autosaving rather than manually placed "soul links". The sequential upgrade system of the first title has been abandoned for a system of "shards" (inspired by the Final Fantasy series's "materia" system), which can be purchased or found throughout the game to upgrade or modify Ori's stats and attacks. Ori's attacks can be managed via a convenient radial menu, and orbs to increase Ori's health and energy can be found throughout the map. Unlike Ori and the Blind Forest, Ori does not travel with Sein.

A new mode called Spirit Trials was revealed at Gamescom 2018. The mode challenges players to race to a goal in the fastest time possible. To enhance competition and strategy, players can see the best times and the routes taken by other players. Will of the Wisps also introduces side quests from NPCs to earn collectible items such as Gorlek Ores, which are used to expand the game's hub area.

== Plot ==
The story takes place immediately after the events of Ori and the Blind Forest and is narrated by the Spirit Tree. Kuro's last egg hatches, giving birth to a baby owl whom Ori, Naru, and Gumo name Ku and raise as part of their family. Being born with a damaged wing, Ku cannot fly until Gumo affixes Kuro's feather to it. Ku and Ori go on a flight that ends up taking them out of Nibel and into Niwen, where a storm separates them.

Ori's search for Ku eventually leads it to Kwolok, a toad looking over the Inkwater Marsh and some of the inhabitants of Niwen, the Moki. He tells Ori that Ku is in the Silent Woods, the Moki's former home now turned into a desolate graveyard of owls, but with the waters of Niwen unclean, Ori must set the wheels of The Wellspring back into motion to enter them. Kwolok also gives Ori a wisp, the Voice of the Forest, to guide them on their journey. Meanwhile, Naru and Gumo head off to Niwen via a raft to find Ori and Ku. Upon setting The Wellspring's wheels back into motion, clearing Niwen's water, Ori enters the Silent Woods and reunites with Ku, but the pair encounters Shriek, a deformed, vicious owl who was an orphan at birth and rejected by the rest of her kind, ruling over the Silent Woods and terrorizing Niwen. Shriek attacks Ori and puts Ku in a coma.

After Ori mourns Ku's state, Kwolok explains that the Voice of the Forest is not at full power and cannot bring Ku back in its current state. Due to the Spirit Willow's prior passing, the light that it carried was shattered into five wisps that scattered across Niwen, leaving the forest vulnerable to corruption and decay that killed the Willow's guardian spirits and Shriek's parents before her birth. Kwolok tasks Ori with seeking the other wisps of the Spirit Willow's light: the Memory, Eyes, Strength, and Heart of the Forest, and merge the four with the Voice to reform the tree's light. Kwolok leaves his marsh to help Ori with locating one of the other wisps, but his body is forcibly taken over by the Stink Spirit, a creature born out of the forest's decay whose body jamming the wheels of The Wellspring had been the cause of its non-functionality. Ori breaks the creature's control over Kwolok, allowing for him to kill it, but their fight leaves him mortally wounded. Before dying, Kwolok pleads to Ori to restore and protect Niwen in his place.

Ori eventually finds all five wisps and merges them together to reform Seir, the Golden Light. Ori and Seir head to the Spirit Willow and Seir revives it. However, the tree tells Ori its time has passed and can no longer carry Seir, asking Ori to merge with the light to restore Niwen, though Ori would have to leave its previous life behind. With that, the Spirit Willow dies for good, and Seir is returned to Ori, but before Ori has a chance to merge with it, Shriek appears and snatches it. Ori defeats Shriek, who returns to the Silent Woods to die under the wings of her parents' petrified corpses.

Ori finally merges with Seir, healing Niwen and reviving Ku with her damaged wing restored in the process, which Naru and Gumo arrive in time to witness. Ku, Naru, and Gumo find where Ori and Seir merged, and discover a Spirit Tree beginning to grow there. They help the tree flourish and continue their life as a family together, as it is revealed that it was the new Spirit Tree that was narrating the story and was Ori all along, retelling the events leading up to when it merged with Seir. Eventually, the tree completely grows and life begins anew as a new spirit guardian falls from it.

== Development and release ==
A lot of people completed Blind Forest in roughly eight hours, and thought that it was a positive experience. But our community told us that there wasn't a lot of draw to come back in once they'd completed the title. They just wanted more. So we took that to heart – this game is three times the size, and scope, and scale of Blind Forest.

— Daniel Smith, senior producer at Xbox Games Studios.

Moon Studios' first game, Ori and the Blind Forest, was both a critical and commercial success, but Daniel Smith observed that players asked for more Ori, as they were able to complete the game in about eight hours. Smith said their team looked at how they could expand the game both in scale and in scope, while maintaining narrative continuity. Lead developer Thomas Mahler said of this change of scope and scale: "The idea is that Will of the Wisps should be to Blind Forest what Super Mario Bros. 3 was to the original Super Mario Bros."

As Blind Forest ended with Ori returning Sein, an entity from the Spirit Tree that granted Ori several of their combat abilities, back to Nibel's Spirit Tree, the team was tasked with discovering a new type of melee-focused combat for Ori with projectile-aiming aspects, which informed the story's development. The original Ori was a game based only on two-dimensional artwork. Jeremy Gritton, an artist for Blizzard Entertainment at the time of Blind Forest's release, was impressed with the game and left Blizzard to join Moon Studios to help lead the art development in Will of the Wisps, with a major shift of making all of the major character art into three-dimensional models played in multilayered backgrounds to make them look seamlessly integrated. This also was used to help with the programs used develop the more flexible and streamlined processes for the cinematics of the game. AM2R developer Milton Guasti joined the team for supporting level design, and part of the level design included recreating the original Blind Forest map within the Will of the Wisps world and wrapping more levels around it. Gareth Coker, who composed the first game's soundtrack, continued to do the music for the sequel, incorporating unique themes for each of the characters that Ori meets throughout the game.

Because of the various expansions of scope and scale, Mahler and fellow lead developer Gennadiy Korol said the team was "crazy iterative" throughout the course of development. For example, the E3 2017 trailer went through 2,000 iterations during polishing. The Moon Studios team, originally about 20 at the time of Blind Forest's release, expanded to 80 by the time Will of the Wisps was completed, but as with the first game, the team remained highly decentralized across the globe with few members working in the same common location and most working from home offices.

Due to the increased scope, which Smith estimated was three times larger than Blind Forest, the game's development took longer than planned, resulting in a few delays. Smith said part of this is functionally tied to the nature of Metroidvanias: "Everything is so interconnected that if you change one aspect of the game, it's just inevitable that it's going to influence the rest. It just takes time to make an experience where we feel it's reached that polish that people want to enjoy." The sequel was first announced at E3 2017 with no set release date. A second trailer was revealed a year later at E3 2018 with a planned 2019 release date. By E3 2019, a new trailer affirmed that the game had been delayed but with a planned February 11, 2020 release date. A final delay of one month was announced with the game's final release trailer at The Game Awards 2019, setting the release date of March 11, 2020. Xbox Game Studios announced a Collector's Edition on the same day which includes a piano collections music CD, a steelbook, premium packaging, an art book and an original soundtrack music MP3 download alongside the game disc.

Ori and the Will of the Wisps was released for Xbox One and Windows 10 on March 11, 2020. It is a 4K UHD, Xbox One X Enhanced, and Xbox Play Anywhere title, and both versions were added to Microsoft's Xbox Game Pass program on launch. Smith said that being included on Game Pass was a net benefit for them: "I think Game Pass is a great vehicle to get what we've created into more gamers' hands and, ultimately, I think it's really healthy for the Ori IP, it's really healthy for Moon, it's really healthy for Xbox, for more people to play Ori."

A version for the Nintendo Switch was announced during a Nintendo Direct Mini: Partner Showcase and was released digitally on September 17, 2020; a physical version of the game and its predecessor were released December 8, 2020. During Microsoft's Xbox Games Showcase in July 2020, it was announced that the game would get an optimized version, running in 4K resolution at 120 frames per second, for the Xbox Series X (and later confirmed for the Xbox Series S) that was released on November 10, 2020.

== Reception ==
Reception

Aggregate scores
Aggregator	Score
Metacritic	PC: 88/100; XONE: 90/100; NS: 93/100; XSX: 92/100
OpenCritic	98% recommend

Review scores
Publication	Score
Destructoid	9.5/10
Electronic Gaming Monthly	4/5
Famitsu	9/10, 9/10, 10/10, 8/10
Game Informer	9.5/10
GameRevolution	4/5
GameSpot	8/10 (XONE); 9/10 (XSX)
GamesRadar+	4.5/5
IGN	9/10
PC Gamer (US)	81/100
The Guardian	5/5
VideoGamer.com	9/10

Ori and the Will of the Wisps received "universal acclaim" for all platforms, according to review aggregator website Metacritic, except for the PC version which received "generally favorable reviews". Fellow review aggregator OpenCritic assessed that the game received "mighty" approval, being recommended by 98% of critics, with the critic consensus reading: "With great level design, tight game mechanics, an appropriate level of challenge, beautiful visuals, and a touching narrative, Ori and the Will of the Wisps proves that Moon Studios' isn't just a one hit wonder." By June 2020, the game was played by more than 2 million people. In mid-November 2020, the player count eclipsed 2.8 million people.

Chris Carter of Destructoid acclaimed the game, calling it a masterpiece. He described the game as "a hallmark of excellence", saying, "There may be flaws, but they are negligible and won't cause massive damage." Carter particularly praised the game's visuals, combat improvements from the game's predecessor, as well as the "dramatic chase sequences". However, he mentioned some frame rate issues regarding the Xbox One version of the game. Electronic Gaming Monthly's Michael Goroff stated positive opinions regarding the game, while pointing out the performance issues which the Xbox One edition of the game suffered from before the day-one patch was released. Goroff further mentioned that "Ori and the Will of the Wisps does everything that a good sequel is supposed to do. It refines The Blind Forest's mechanics, expands on the world, and throws in a whole bunch of new moves and concepts. But in an era that's rich with 'emotional platformers', Will of the Wisps doesn't do anything to make itself stand out. It's a fine, if not forgettable, experience." Writing for Game Informer, Andrew Reiner praised the game's graphics, story and combat, subsequently calling the game better than its predecessor. Reiner said, "The story is fantastic, the world is breathtaking, and all of that pales in comparison to the wonderfully made gameplay that soars both as a platforming and combat game. Moon Studios has outdone itself with Will of the Wisps, delivering an experience that doesn't have any lulls, makes the player feel clever, and just keeps getting better as it goes". GameSpot's critic, Steve Watts, gave the game a positive review, commending the combat, exploring elements, story as well as the "gorgeous animation and environments". Moreover, he highlighted occasional visual bugs as negative aspects of the game. 8 months after the initial release on Xbox One, another GameSpot critic, Mike Epstein, gave the Xbox Series X version of the game a higher score, commending the various enhancements it received and the "ironing out" of technical issues that "held back the launch version".

Austin Wood, reviewer for GamesRadar+, acclaimed the game and its "breathtaking music", its world and its platforming. Wood stated that "There are a few minor stumbles here and there, but make no mistake: I adore Ori and the Will of the Wisps. It's one of the best platformers ever made, and it's an easy front-runner for game of the year. If you liked the first game, you will love this one. And if you haven't experienced Ori's story, you owe it to yourself to dive in now, especially with both games now on Xbox Game Pass. I'll be replaying this game, listening to its soundtrack, and reminiscing over its characters for years to come." However, Wood acknowledged some negatives regarding a few of the game's abilities and called the final level "slightly underwhelming". Brandin Tyrrel of IGN also praised the game, saying, "Ori and the Will of the Wisps is an excellent return to this bright and beautiful open-world platformer, with an affecting story to bolster the white-knuckle challenge." Tyrrell further complimented the game for staying true to the original, while at the same time adding more content than its predecessor. PC Gamer's critic Tyler Wilde gave the game a favorable review, praising the platforming, boss fights and the visuals. However, Wilde mentioned some criticism regarding the fighting, saying "it's not much fun".

Writing for VideoGamer, Josh Wise acclaimed the game for its graphics, music and platforming, stating that "In the beauty stakes and beyond, there are very few, in the rarefied realms of indie or AAA, who can challenge it". However, Wise pointed out some negatives towards the game's plot, calling it "thin". Tola Onanuga of The Guardian praised the game, saying that "More than anything else, Ori and the Will of the Wisps is an intoxicating feast for the senses. From its hauntingly beautiful visuals to its ambient, responsive music, there is so much to love about the look and feel of this long-awaited sequel." Onanuga acknowledged some less positive aspects of the game, calling the story "melancholy at times" and stating that fighting "the more common enemies can feel a little tedious after a while". She ended her review in a positive manner, saying, "Peppered with devious puzzles, Ori and the Will of the Wisp[s] is an irresistible challenge. There is extraordinary attention to detail – the entire world feels alive with excitement and danger."

Time and Game Informer listed Ori and the Will of the Wisps among The 10 Best Video Games of 2020 and the best games in the eighth video game generation, respectively. The Washington Post listed the game among their top ten best games of 2020, while Paste listed it in their top 20 best games of 2020. Polygon has listed the game among The 50 best games of 2020, while WhatCulture ranked it third among the 20 Best Video Games of 2020. Ars Technica listed the game among the best games of 2020. The Guardian listed the game in the top 5 of the 15 best video games of 2020. Bloomberg listed the game in the top 5 of the 15 best video games of 2020. Ori and the Will of the Wisps ranked top 3 in Digital Foundry's Best Games of 2020, as well as in their top 10 of Best Game Graphics of 2020. The game appeared at #5 in Game Informer's Game of the Year Countdown.

=== Awards ===
The game was nominated at the Golden Joystick Awards 2020 for the “Best Visual Design”, “Xbox Game of the Year”, and “Ultimate Game of the Year” categories. It won “Xbox Game of the Year”. The game received three nominations at The Game Awards 2020 for "Best Art Direction", "Best Score and Music", and "Best Action/Adventure", but it did not win any category.

At the 2020 awards from the National Academy of Video Game Trade Reviewers (NAVGTR for short), the game was nominated for the "Outstanding Art Direction, Fantasy", "Outstanding Gameplay Design, Franchise", "Outstanding Original Light Mix Score, Franchise", and "Outstanding Control Design, 2D or Limited 3D" categories, with the game winning all of the categories it was nominated for aside from "Outstanding Gameplay Design, Franchise". Ori and the Will of the Wisps received five nominations at the 24th Annual D.I.C.E. Awards for "Adventure Game of the Year" and outstanding achievement in "Animation", "Art Direction", "Audio Design", and "Original Music Composition". At the 2021 edition of the SXSW Gaming Awards, the game was nominated for the "Video Game of the Year", "Excellence in Animation, Art, and Visual Achievement", "Excellence in Game Design", and "Excellence in Score" categories.
