= Moon Studios =

Austrian video game developer

Moon Studios GmbH
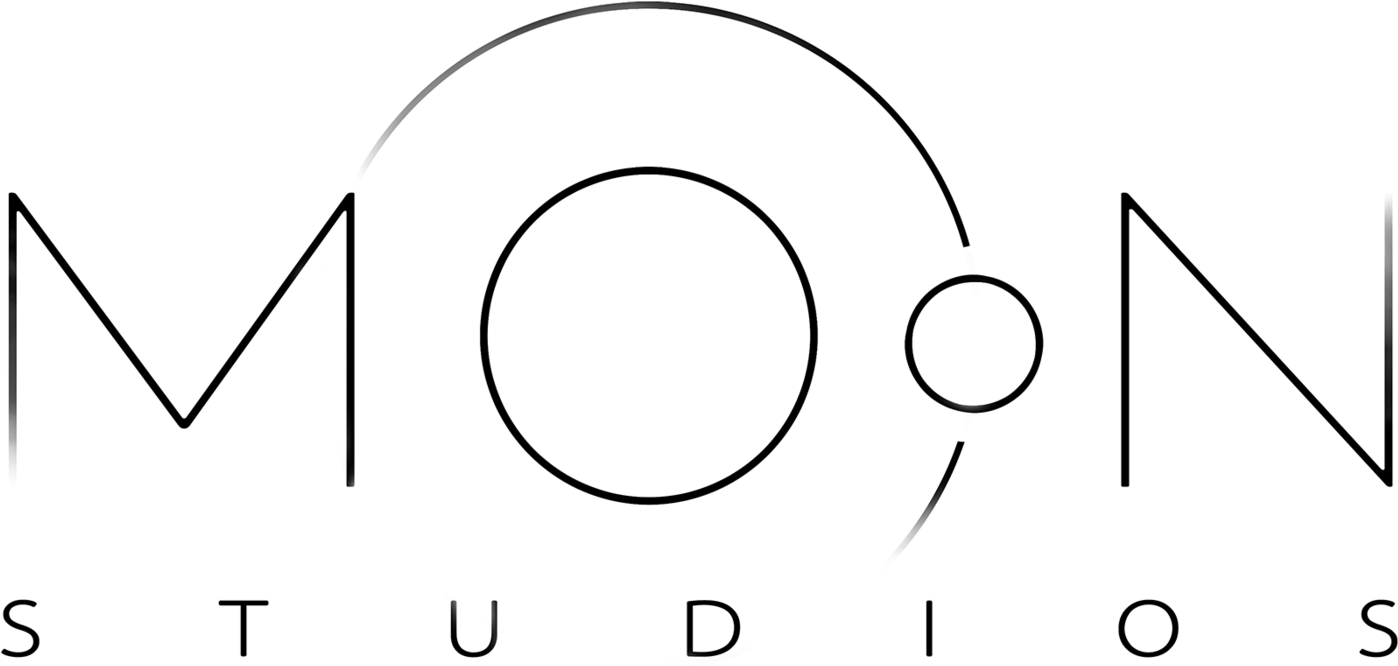
- Type: Private
- Industry: Video games
- Founded: 2010; 16 years ago
- Founder: Thomas Mahler; Gennadiy Korol
- Headquarters: Vienna, Austria
- Key people: Thomas Mahler (CEO)
- Products: Ori and the Blind Forest; Ori and the Will of the Wisps; No Rest for the Wicked
- Number of employees: 80+ (2020)
- Website: moongamestudios.com

Moon Studios GmbH is an Austrian video game developer founded in 2010. It developed Ori and the Blind Forest, its sequel, Ori and the Will of the Wisps and upcoming No Rest for the Wicked.

== History ==
The studio was founded in 2010 by Thomas Mahler and Gennadiy Korol. During Mahler's tenure at Blizzard Entertainment, the successes of independent games like Castle Crashers, Limbo, and Braid encouraged him to leave the company to found an independent studio. The two chose the name "Moon Studios" as the company name as they were inspired by John F. Kennedy's quote, "We choose to go to the Moon". Mahler described Moon Studios as a "virtual studio," as the team did not rent an office and instead recruited talents from all over the world. Team members came from places such as Austria, Australia, Israel and the United States, and they collaborated with each other using the Internet. The company's headquarters are located in Mahler's native Vienna.

Mahler was interested with video games and artwork at an early age and studied traditional sculpture in the Academy of Fine Arts Vienna. He worked at Blizzard Entertainment on visual effects as a Cinematic Artist before founding Moon Studios GmbH in Vienna together with Gennadiy Korol in 2010.

After assembling the team, Moon Studios started creating prototypes. One early prototype was named Warsoup, a first-person shooter mixed with real-time strategy elements. Another prototype was named Sein, a platformer with Metroidvania gameplay. Moon Studios started pitching Warsoup to publishers. Microsoft dismissed Warsoup but agreed to fund Sein, with Microsoft retaining the rights to the intellectual property. With a core team of 10 people alongside several remote working contractors, the game, which would later be renamed Ori and the Blind Forest, took the team 4 years to develop.

The team met with each other for the first time at E3 2014, when the announcement trailer was released. Ori and the Blind Forest received critical acclaim when it was released in March 2015. It was also a commercial success, as it recouped its development in 7 days.

Following the success of Ori and the Blind Forest, the team expanded significantly. As of March 2020, the studio employed more than 80 people and recruited talents from 43 countries. To facilitate communication, Moon built its communication tool named "Apollo". The team also organised yearly retreats to ensure the team bond together. At E3 2017, it announced a sequel, Ori and the Will of the Wisps, which was released for the Xbox One and Windows 10 on 10 March 2020.

In December 2019, the studio announced that it was developing the action role-playing game No Rest for the Wicked. The game was formally revealed at The Game Awards 2023 and was announced for publication by Private Division, a label of Take-Two Interactive. No Rest for the Wicked launched in Early Access for Windows via Steam on 18 April 2024. In February 2026, Moon Studios announced that No Rest for the Wicked had sold 1.5 million copies during Early Access.

In 2024, Take-Two Interactive began the process of shuttering Private Division. Following several months of negotiations, Moon Studios reacquired the publishing rights to No Rest for the Wicked in March 2025 and stated that the studio had become fully independent. In January 2026, the studio released the Together update, adding cooperative multiplayer to the game during Early Access.

== Games developed ==
Year	Title	Platform(s)
2015	Ori and the Blind Forest	Nintendo Switch, Windows, Xbox One
2020	Ori and the Will of the Wisps	Nintendo Switch, Windows, Xbox One, Xbox Series X/S
2027	No Rest for the Wicked	PlayStation 5, Windows
