= Ori and the Blind Forest =

2015 video game

- Developer: Moon Studios
- Publisher: Microsoft Studios (Note: Physical Windows version and GOG release published by Nordic Games. Collector's Edition and physical Nintendo Switch version published by iam8bit.)
- Director: Thomas Mahler
- Producer: Gennadiy Korol
- Designer: Thomas Mahler
- Programmer: Gennadiy Korol
- Artist: Johannes Figlhuber
- Writer: Thomas Mahler
- Composer: Gareth Coker
- Engine: Unity
- Platforms: Windows; Xbox One; Nintendo Switch
- Release: Windows, Xbox One; March 11, 2015; Definitive Edition; Xbox One; March 11, 2016; Windows; April 27, 2016; Nintendo Switch; September 27, 2019
- Genre: Metroidvania
- Mode: Single-player

Ori and the Blind Forest is a Metroidvania video game developed by Moon Studios and published by Microsoft Studios. The game was released for Windows and Xbox One in March 2015, and for Nintendo Switch in September 2019. Players assume control of Ori, a small white spirit, and Sein, the "light and eyes" of the Forest's Spirit Tree. Players are tasked to move between platforms and solve puzzles. The game features a save system called "Soul Links", which allows players to save their progress at will with limited resources, and an upgrade system that allows players to strengthen Ori's skills and abilities.

The game was developed by Moon Studios, a collective organization without a set location. The distribution rights to the game were acquired by Microsoft a year after the beginning of the game's development. The game story was inspired by The Lion King and The Iron Giant, while some of the gameplay elements were inspired by the Rayman and Metroid franchises.

Upon release, the game received critical acclaim, with players praising the gameplay, art direction, story, action sequences, musical score, and environmental design. The game was also named as a title that represented art in video games. Moon Studios co-founder Gennadiy Korol said the game was profitable for the company within a few weeks after its initial launch. An expansion, called the Definitive Edition, was released in March 2016. A direct sequel, Ori and the Will of the Wisps, was announced during Electronic Entertainment Expo 2017 and was released on March 11, 2020.

== Gameplay ==
Gameplay screenshot showing Ori and Sein (blue orb above Ori's head). The HUD at the bottom represents Ori's energy and health, as well as the progress towards the next level up.

Ori and the Blind Forest is a 2D Metroidvania; a platform game with an emphasis on exploration, collecting items and upgrades, and backtracking to previously inaccessible areas. The player controls Ori, a white guardian spirit, and Sein, who is the light and eyes of the Spirit Tree. As Ori, players must jump, climb, and use various other abilities to navigate the game's world. Sein can shoot Spirit Flames to combat enemies or break obstacles. Ori is required to interact with the environment by jumping from platforms and solving puzzles, and is faced with various enemies. The player helps Ori collect health cells, energy cells, new abilities, and upgrades. The game world unfolds to the player in the fashion of a Metroidvania, with new abilities allowing the player to access previously inaccessible areas.

In addition to scripted save points scattered in the game, players can create "soul links" at any time they choose to serve as checkpoints. However, soul links can only be created using energy cells collected during gameplay; the needed energy is not in abundant supply, forcing players to create them only when necessary. The player can obtain ability points to gain upgrades and benefits, such as increasing the damage of Sein's Spirit Flame. These upgrades can be achieved when the player has enough ability points to learn the skill they desire, anywhere a soul link has been created. An ability point is gained when Ori collects enough experience by killing enemies, destroying various plants, and finding spirit light containers or ability cells (which instantly awards Ori an ability point). Each skill must be learned in sequential order from one of three ability trees to allow the next skill to be accessible. Ori can learn new abilities such as wall jumping, and double jumping.

== Plot ==
The voice of the Spirit Tree in the forest of Nibel narrates the story of when Ori, a guardian spirit, fell from it during a storm as a newborn and was adopted by a creature named Naru, who raised Ori as her own. A cataclysmic event soon makes the forest wither, and Naru dies of starvation. Newly orphaned, Ori is left to explore the forest on their own. After collapsing near the Spirit Tree and being revived by it, Ori later meets Sein, a small orb who guides Ori on a journey to restore the forest. Sein tasks Ori with recovering the light of three main elements supporting the balance of Nibel: Waters, Winds, and Warmth.

Ori and Sein come across two beings in their quest: Gumo, the last survivor of the spider-like Gumon clan, who were wiped out by the forest's cataclysm, and whose home supports the Wind element; and Kuro, a giant, shadowy owl who is hostile toward Ori. Gumo initially steals the key to the Water element, but he returns it after Ori saves him from a rockslide. After the Wind element is rekindled, Ori and Sein find Kuro's nest, empty except for a single egg, and they learn the source of her wrath and the forest's cataclysm: when Ori was lost, the Spirit Tree released a flash of light to look for it, which burned and killed all of Kuro's recently hatched offspring when she was away from her nest looking for food. Determined to prevent this from happening to her yet unborn child, Kuro took away the core on top of the Spirit Tree, which is actually Sein. Without its core, the Spirit Tree could not sustain the three elements, and Nibel lost its balance. Meanwhile, Gumo overhears Ori and Sein's intentions to restore Nibel and uses his clan treasure that stores the light from the Spirit Tree to revive Naru, taking her to where Ori is.

After the final element, Warmth, is restored in the volcano Mount Horu, Kuro attacks Ori and Sein as the fire from Horu spreads. Naru, who had been separated from Gumo, arrives to protect Ori from Kuro. Kuro softens, remembering the pain of losing her children. As the fire spreads and is about to reach her remaining egg, Kuro takes Sein back to the Spirit Tree, which emits a flash of bright light that dissipates the fire and restores the forest, but Kuro is destroyed by the light. Time passes as the forest begins to flourish once more, and Ori watches new spirits being born in the field at the foot of the Spirit Tree. Gumo and Naru watch together from afar, before the latter goes home, where Kuro's last egg now rests, just in time to see it begin to hatch.

== Development ==
Ori and the Blind Forest was developed by Moon Studios, a worldwide collaboration of designers and programmers who had been working on the game for four years before it was released, with Microsoft acquiring the game about a year after development started. One of the lead team members is Thomas Mahler, an artist formerly working with Blizzard Entertainment. According to Microsoft producer Daniel Smith, Moon Studios is not located in any one location, but instead, staffers are working from around the world, including Austria, Australia, Israel, and the United States. Gameplay programmer David Clark described the team as being inspired by current and classic adventure games, notably the Rayman and Metroid franchises, and that Ori is intended as a "love letter" to those games.

The designers say they were guided by works such as The Lion King and The Iron Giant and that it is a "coming-of-age story". The designers were heavily influenced by the work of Hayao Miyazaki, particularly with one of the levels "Valley of the Wind", being a nod to Nausicaä of the Valley of the Wind. The art style is meant to appear hand-drawn, similar to the more recent Rayman titles that utilize Ubisoft's UbiArt graphics engine; the game instead uses the Unity engine. The game takes place in one large map, rendered at 1080p and 60 frames per second with no visible loading time as the player explores. According to Mahler, the game's backgrounds are all individual components, with none duplicated as in other similar titles. As an example, Mahler explained, "You see this tree in the background and this mushroom and this rock? That's the one and only place you'll ever see those assets."

The game was unveiled at E3 2014 during Microsoft's pre-show press conference at the Galen Center; E3 was the first time a number of Moon Studios employees actually met face-to-face. Microsoft's Yusuf Mehdi, in charge of marketing for Xbox One, stated that they considered opening the conference with Ori, but instead chose Call of Duty: Advanced Warfare. During E3, attendees waited in long lines to play a demo version of the game, often waiting in queues 7-8 people deep for each of the four consoles featuring the game.

Sometime after E3, Moon Studios announced on the game website that an Xbox 360 version of Ori and the Blind Forest was in development and planned for release sometime in early 2015. In November 2014, Moon Studios updated the status of the game and announced plans to push back the launch of the title into "early 2015" for Xbox One and PC, but no further mention of the Xbox 360 version was made at the time. Asked to clarify the status of the Xbox 360 edition, Moon Studios confirmed it was still in development and would be released later in 2015. As of January 2018, there has been no further announcement on the status of the Xbox 360 release and has been considered cancelled.

Ori and the Blind Forest: Definitive Edition was announced at Gamescom 2015. The expansion contains new areas, mechanics, and artwork. Specifically, it adds in "easy" and "hard" difficulty levels, which alter health and damage inflicted by enemies, and "One Life" mode; it enables fast travel between spirit wells to help traverse the game's world and it enables full backtracking through the map. This version was released on March 11, 2016 for Xbox One, on the one-year anniversary of the game, while the Windows version was released shortly afterwards on April 27, 2016. Those who have already purchased the original game are able to upgrade to the Definitive Edition. In May 2016, Nordic Games announced that they had partnered with Moon Studios and Microsoft to release a retail version of the Definitive Edition for Windows. It was released on June 14, 2016.

Following from Microsoft's working relationship with Nintendo after the release of Minecraft and Cuphead for the Nintendo Switch and the Banjo-Kazooie series receiving representation in the Switch crossover title Super Smash Bros. Ultimate, The Definitive Edition for Nintendo Switch was announced during Nintendo's Indie World showcase and was released on September 27, 2019.

== Reception ==
Reception

Aggregate score
Aggregator	Score
Metacritic	PC: 88/100; XONE: 88/100; XONE (Definitive Edition): 88/100; PC (Definitive Edition): 88/100; NS: 90/100

Review scores
Publication	Score
Destructoid	9.5/10
Electronic Gaming Monthly	9/10
Famitsu	9/10, 9/10, 9/10, 9/10
Game Informer	9.5/10
GameRevolution	4/5
GameSpot	9/10
GamesRadar+	4/5
GameTrailers	8.6/10
IGN	8.5/10
Official Xbox Magazine (UK)	4.5/5
PC Gamer (US)	87/100
Polygon	9/10
VideoGamer.com	9/10

Ori and the Blind Forest received "universal acclaim" for the Nintendo Switch version and "generally favourable reviews" for the Windows and Xbox One versions, according to video game review aggregator website Metacritic. Praise was directed to the game's story, visuals, gameplay, music, exploration, and environmental design.

Writing for Game Informer, Andrew Reiner gave the game a 9.5/10, praising numerous aspects of the game, but stated that the combat system in the game was not as refined as the platforming. He named the game "one of the best games of the year" and claimed that "there isn't a bad moment in Ori and the Blind Forest". Chris Carter from Destructoid also gave the game a 9.5/10, praising its narrative, upgrades, and visuals, which he compared to the Rayman series but that "[Ori] easily surpasses them in quality." He also praised the game for allowing players to set their own checkpoints anytime. He summarized the review by saying that "it succeeds in being both a great introduction to the genre and a rewarding experience for the hardcore audience" and called the game "a new classic" as a Metroidvania.

Ray Carsillo from Electronic Gaming Monthly praised the variety of environments, art style, story, and the quick save system, and further complimented the emphasis on platforming, puzzle-solving, and exploration instead of combat as it allowed players to fully appreciate the level design. However, he criticized the occasional frame rate drops as well as the game for not enabling players to re-enter certain areas after completing their quests (an issue addressed in the Definitive Edition). He stated that the game "is polished enough to rarely break the immersion it inspires. It's one of my favorite titles of 2015 so far and an unforgettable debut for indie developer Moon Studios." Kevin VanOrd from GameSpot gave the game a 9/10, praising its visuals, level design, gameplay challenges, and storytelling, which he compared to Ōkami and Panzer Dragoon Orta and having "among the best story sequences of any game." However, he criticized the levels as occasionally frustrating.

Lucas Sullivan from GamesRadar gave the game a score of 8/10, praising its animations, atmosphere, music, and gameplay, which he stated "has conveyed a real sense of lightweight agility". However, he criticized the save system, which he felt lead to constant death, and had difficulty spikes during the escape sequences. He summarized the game by saying that "Completing Ori's six-to-nine-hour journey will certainly leave you feeling warm, fuzzy, and accomplished – just be ready to dig in for some particularly trying segments." Nick Tan from Game Revolution gave the game a 4/5, praising its presentation and platforming, but criticizing its short length and low replay value, also believing the game was "needlessly punishing" in the escape sequences.

The game has been considered an example of video games becoming closer to art. For example, Chris Melissinos commented that the video game audience was not used to seeing the "dreamlike sensitivity" of its style of art, "usually reserved for high profile animated films".

=== Sales ===
According to Moon Studios' Thomas Mahler, Ori and the Blind Forest became profitable for Microsoft within one week of the game's launch on Xbox One and PC; and Gennadiy Korol, co-founder of Moon Studios, said the game was profitable for the studio itself within "a couple of weeks." Mahler described Microsoft as being "super-happy" with Ori and hinted that the franchise may see a future installment, eventually leading to Ori and the Will of the Wisps. He stated that the Xbox 360 version of the game was still in development and was at the time expected to launch later in the spring (Q2) of 2015. Although no official statement has confirmed it, the Xbox 360 version has been cancelled and was never released.

=== Awards ===
List of awards and nominations
Award	Category	Result	Ref.
Golden Joystick Awards 2015	Best Original Game	Nominated	
Golden Joystick Awards 2015	Best Visual Design	Nominated	
Golden Joystick Awards 2015	Game of the Year	Nominated	
Golden Joystick Awards 2015	Best Audio	Won	
Golden Joystick Awards 2015	Xbox Game of the Year	Won	
The Game Awards 2015	Best Independent Game	Nominated	
The Game Awards 2015	Best Score/Soundtrack	Nominated	
The Game Awards 2015	Best Action/Adventure	Nominated	
The Game Awards 2015	Best Art Direction	Won	
2016 British Academy Games Awards	Original Property	Nominated	
2016 British Academy Games Awards	Music	Nominated	
2016 British Academy Games Awards	Debut Game	Nominated	
2016 British Academy Games Awards	Artistic Achievement	Won	
Canadian Videogame Awards 2015	Fans' Choice: Best International Game	Nominated	
19th Annual D.I.C.E. Awards	Game of the Year	Nominated	
19th Annual D.I.C.E. Awards	Adventure Game of the Year	Nominated	
19th Annual D.I.C.E. Awards	Outstanding Achievement in Animation	Won	
19th Annual D.I.C.E. Awards	Outstanding Achievement in Art Direction	Won	
19th Annual D.I.C.E. Awards	Outstanding Achievement in Original Music Composition	Won	
19th Annual D.I.C.E. Awards	Outstanding Achievement in Sound Design	Nominated	
National Academy of Video Game Trade Reviewers (NAVGTR) awards 2015	Game, Original Adventure	Won	

== Legacy ==
The main characters, Ori and Sein, were announced as a playable fighter in the independent fighting game Rivals of Aether on June 12, 2017 and were released on August 23, 2017.

A direct sequel, Ori and the Will of the Wisps, was announced during E3 2017 and shown again during E3 2018, Gamescom 2018, E3 2019 and The Game Awards 2019. It was released on March 11, 2020.
