= Prince of Persia 3D =

1999 video game

- North American Windows box art
- Developer: Mindscape (Note: Dreamcast version developed by Avalanche Software.)
- Publishers: Windows; Red Orb Entertainment; Dreamcast; Mattel Interactive
- Producer: Andrew Pedersen
- Designer: Todd Kerpelman
- Programmer: Peter Lipson
- Artists: Jacques Hennequet; Chris Grun
- Writers: John Morgan; Jordan Mechner
- Composers: Jonelle Adkisson; Greg Rahn
- Series: Prince of Persia
- Engine: NetImmerse
- Platforms: Windows, Dreamcast
- Release: Windows: NA: September 17, 1999; EU: October 1, 1999; Dreamcast: NA: December 6, 2000
- Genres: Action-adventure, platform
- Mode: Single-player

Prince of Persia 3D is a 1999 action-adventure game developed by Mindscape and published by Red Orb Entertainment for Microsoft Windows. A port for the Dreamcast was developed by Avalanche Software and published by Mattel Interactive in North America the following year under the title Prince of Persia: Arabian Nights. It is the first 3D installment in the Prince of Persia series, and the final game in the trilogy that started with the original 1989 game. Taking the role of the titular unnamed character rescuing his bride from a monstrous suitor's schemes, the gameplay follows the Prince as he explores environments, platforming and solving puzzles while engaging in combat scenarios.

Production began in 1997 and lasted over two years. While series creator Jordan Mechner acted as a creative consultant and contributed to the narrative, he was mostly uninvolved. The visual design drew from Medieval Persia with added fantastical elements. A planned PlayStation port was cancelled in favour of the Dreamcast version. Reception of the title was mixed, with most of the criticism focusing on its gameplay and several bugs. Following its sale to Ubisoft, the series was rebooted under Mechner's guidance with 2003's Prince of Persia: The Sands of Time.

== Gameplay ==
Prince of Persia 3D is an action-adventure video game. The player controls the main protagonist, an unnamed Prince from a kingdom in Persia; the Prince is navigated through fifteen levels. Environments are seen through a fixed third-person view which tracks with the Prince's movements. When the Prince is standing still, the player can take manual control of the camera to examine the environment. The Prince is guided through levels using tank controls. While exploring levels, he can jump across gaps and up onto platforms, climb up and explore along ledges, deal with traps, and swim through bodies of water. Many puzzles found during levels, which must be solved to progress, involve activating levers and triggering pressure plates and switches. Potions can be found through the environments, with effects ranging from replenishing and increasing health to turning invisible or curing poison.

While exploring, the Prince can engage individual enemies in close-range combat with three weapon types; the sword, the spear or staff, a bow and twin blades. The bow can only be used outside normal combat to shoot enemies from a distance, and can also be used in some puzzle types. The health of the Prince and their current opponent is shown along the bottom of the screen. Combat is initiated when drawing a weapon with an enemy nearby, with the camera switching to a side perspective which adjusts with the Prince's movements. While always facing the enemy, the Prince can move in any direction. During battle, the player can strike from both sides and above, block attacks, and feint a move to create an opening for an attack. If a character's blow is blocked, then the attacker is stunned for a short time and the opponent can launch a faster counterattack. Some scenarios in levels allow the Prince to either sneak past enemies or use environmental elements to kill them. If the Prince runs out of health, the game ends and must be restarted either from a save point or the beginning of a level.

== Plot ==
The Sultan, together with the recently married Prince and Princess, visit the kingdom of his brother Assan south of Persia. During an entertainment, Assan's guards kill the Sultan's own guard and imprison the Prince. The Sultan had previously promised the Princess's hand to Assan's son Rugnor, a vow the Sultan broke when the Prince married her. The Prince escapes captivity and makes his way to the Sultan, who unsuccessfully attempts to persuade the Prince to give the Princess up. Assan attempts to kill the Prince, but kills the Sultan when he steps between them. The Sultan asks the Prince to save the Princess before he dies, and the Prince flees as Assan accuses the Prince of the Sultan's murder. Rugnor, revealed to be a half-human half-tiger creature, kidnaps the Princess and has multiple run-ins with the Prince. When the Princess refuses to yield to Rugnor, going as far as cutting off his hand with a sword, he decides to kill her by tying her to a large gear machine in his lair to crush her to death. The Prince arrives in time, killing Rugnor by knocking him into the gears and stopping the machine. The Prince then spirits the Princess away to an unknown destination.

== Development ==
Prince of Persia 3D began active development in 1997 at Mindscape. Preproduction had begun in April 1996 when the first proposals were made. During its production period, the Prince of Persia brand changed ownership from Broderbund after the company was purchased by The Learning Company in mid-1998, then by Mattel Interactive in December of that same year through a merger with The Learning Company. The game was published under the Red Orb Entertainment brand, which was split away from Broderbund during the buyout and continued to support Mindscape. Series creator Jordan Mechner was brought in as a creative consultant, and co-authored the scenario; the cutscene dialogue was written by John Morgan. Mechner was brought on board after finishing work on The Last Express. He never felt connected to the project, saying that it was always the brainchild of producer Andrew Pederson. He described his role as simply giving the go-ahead, and being brought in to consult on proposed mechanics. Mechner disliked the project as it evolved, seeing as little more than a clone of Tomb Raider, which was very popular at the time. He also felt a disconnect with the Prince character, as executive pressure had forced the Prince into becoming a character he barely recognised. Around 20 people worked on the game, plus a few contractors in Canada helping out on cutscenes.

During the design phase, the team put a lot of effort into creating the narrative and the environmental design. Environments and architecture, together with enemy designs, drew inspiration from the history and religion of Medieval Persia. The storyline itself was meant to emulate the style of One Thousand and One Nights. Much of the architecture was based on Persia during the 9th and 12th century, with the team consulting Mechner with incorporating "more contemporary" traps. The game's characters and enemies were worked on by artist Chris Grun, who was described by Mechner as someone who was "not Disney, not realistic, just Prince of Persia". Grun drew inspiration for his designs from the work of Danish illustrator Kay Nielsen, who created illustrations for One Thousand and One Nights, and the work of artist Edmond de Lack. In portraying different cultures, he was directly inspired by the conflicts caused by the spread of Islam through the region.

The battle sequences drew inspiration both from earlier Prince of Persia titles, and other titles including Bushido Blade. The more realistic fighting was influenced by the two weapon and fighting consultants hired for the project, one involved with weapon props for movies (Richard Pallaziol) and the other an ex-Marine. The two were filmed acting out fighting moves, which were then mimicked inside the game environment. For the Prince's athletics, the team had an Olympic gymnast perform them on camera, then they used the footage to replicate the actions in-game. This style, while not true motion capture, was a style similar to Mechner's rotoscoping technique for the original Prince of Persia titles.

The game used the third-party NetImmerse game engine, with character animation and AI behaviour handled by Motion Factory's Motivate middleware system. The team considered creating their own game engine during early production, but settled on third-party software so they could focus on game development. NetImmerse was used to manage polygon models and particle effects, while Motivate was used for animation development. Other actions and elements were otherwise handled by the in-house programming team. The engine's versatility allowed the developers to create both indoor and outdoor environments without many restrictions. Further graphical elements included warping polygon models to allow actions such as the Prince's breathing to be visible. Several different graphical options were supported, and 3D acceleration was a requirement for the title. The music was co-composed by Tom Rettig, Jonelle Adkisson and Greg Rahn.

== Release ==
Prince of Persia 3D was announced by Broderbund in April 1998, planned for a release in "early 1999". It was later shown off at that year's E3. As part of the promotion, a developer's blog was originally operated on the game's website, although due to workload the blog was not greatly expanded. The game was released for Microsoft Windows in North America on September 17, 1999, followed by Europe on October 1. Multiple patches were released for the game over the following weeks, focusing on fixing reported bugs.

The port of Prince of Persia 3D for the Dreamcast was developed by Avalanche Software and published by Mattel Interactive. For the port, the game was retitled Prince of Persia: Arabian Nights. The Dreamcast version was released in North America on December 6, 2000. A port was also being developed for the PlayStation, based on the PC version and featuring gameplay alterations to appeal to fans of action games; however, the port was cancelled so staff could focus on the Dreamcast port.

== Reception ==
Reception

Aggregate scores
Aggregator	Score	
Aggregator	Dreamcast	PC
GameRankings	61%	64%
Metacritic	58/100	N/A

Review scores
Publication	Score	
Publication	Dreamcast	PC
CNET Gamecenter	N/A	3/10
Computer Games Strategy Plus	N/A	3/5
Computer Gaming World	N/A	3.5/5
Consoles +	78%	N/A
Edge	N/A	5/10
Electronic Gaming Monthly	2/10 4/10 6/10	N/A
GamePro	(Note: Graphics: 4/5, Sound: 4/5, Control: 4/5, Fun Factor: 4/5)	(Note: Graphics: 4/5, Sound: 3/5, Control: 2.5/5, Fun Factor: 3.5/5)
GameRevolution	N/A	C−
GameSpot	N/A	6/10
GameSpy	N/A	79%
IGN	7.1/10	8.2/10
Next Generation	N/A	4/5
PC Accelerator	N/A	3/10
PC Gamer (US)	N/A	70%
PC PowerPlay	N/A	65%
Dreamcast Magazine	54%	N/A
Official Dreamcast Magazine (US)	3/10	N/A

The Dreamcast version received "mixed" reviews according to the review aggregation website Metacritic. In retrospective opinions from Mechner and game journalists, Prince of Persia 3D is considered one of the weakest titles in the series and a key reason for a growing lack of interest from the gaming community.

IGN praised the PC version's unique score, fluid animations and well made graphics, and the jumping mechanics. GameSpot criticised the same version's rough character models, difficult camera effects, and unresponsive controls, but praised the action. John Lee of NextGen gave a positive review to the PC version of the game, but noted the controls as "sluggish" and the occasional problems with the camera. Peter Olafson of GamePro was generally positive to the PC version of the game, but was critical to the controls and camera. Later, however, Dr. Zombie called the Dreamcast version a "solid fun for Dreamcast, providing a good mix of action with challenging puzzle solving", but deemed it inferior compared to other adventure games such as Tomb Raider: The Last Revelation.

== Legacy ==
Following the poor performance of Prince of Persia 3D, Mechner distanced himself from the video game industry, feeling burned out and disconnected from the series. In 2001, Mattel sold off The Learning Company's entertainment division, which included rights to the Prince of Persia series catalogue, to Ubisoft. At that time, Mechner retained the IP rights, and Ubisoft contacted him about rebooting the series. While Mechner was reluctant, Ubisoft won him over and he decided to start over with both the series and its lead character. That reboot, Prince of Persia: The Sands of Time, was released in 2003 to commercial success and positive reviews. The game saw multiple sequels, and is cited as the reason players and critics returned to the Prince of Persia series following Prince of Persia 3D.
