= Francis Mechner =

American research psychologist (born 1931)

Francis Mechner (born 1931) is an Austrian-born American research psychologist best known for having developed and introduced (in 1959) a formal symbolic language for the codification and notation of behavioral contingencies. He has published articles about the language's applications in economics, finance, education, environment, business management, biology, clinical practice, and law. Mechner is also known for a variety of contributions to instructional technology and basic research in the field of learning.

== Early life and personal life ==
Born in Vienna, Austria, in 1931, Mechner came to the United States as a Jewish refugee from Nazi-occupied Europe in 1944 after having spent three years in France and over two years in Cuba. By age 19 he was an accomplished classical concert pianist, portrait painter, and USCF-rated chess master.

In the late 1980s he composed the soundtracks for the video games Karateka and Prince of Persia, both developed by his oldest son Jordan Mechner. Mechner has been a member of the Board of Trustees of the Cambridge Center for Behavioral Studies since 1985.

== Relationship with Columbia University ==
Mechner received his PhD in 1957 from Columbia University's Department of Psychology under Professors F. S. Keller and William N. Schoenfeld. As lecturer on the department's teaching faculty from 1955 to 1960, he developed and taught a novel type of laboratory course in experimental psychology in which students learned to design and conduct experiments on learning, perception, and concept formation, and to analyze and interpret data. He taught two sections of that course—one for Columbia's Teachers College graduate students and one for Columbia graduate and undergraduate students.

== Research and applied work ==
Throughout his career Mechner continued to conduct basic and applied research in the fields of learning and educational technology. In 1957, as Director of the Schering Corporation (eventually Schering-Plough Corp.) psychopharmacology laboratory, he built the first computerized behavior research laboratory in which he conducted research on behavioral effect of drugs, and basic behavior research using rats, pigeons, monkeys, and humans. In 1960 he introduced a new instructional technology in conjunction with his founding of Basic Systems, Inc. with business partner David Padwa, a company they sold to Xerox Corporation in 1965. Key aspects of this technology are the specification of learning objectives at the outset of the development process, analysis of the subject matter in terms of its component skills and concepts, the systematic sequencing of these, active response by the learner, and cycles of testing and revision of the material on the intended target population.

Mechner applied this technology to elementary school and high school courses in science and mathematics, nursing and medical education, for the training of industry personnel, and in 1962 for interpersonal skill training via the audio-lingual programs in "Effective Listening" and "Professional Selling Skills." The latter, when marketed by Xerox Learning Systems (the renamed Basic Systems, Inc.) and later by Learning International, Inc., was claimed to be the most widely used training system of all time. Another Basic Systems-Xerox program that applies this technology and is still being sold today is "Bobby Fischer Teaches Chess."

In 1963, under a contract with the office of Governor Peabody of Massachusetts, Dr. Mechner developed the design for a residential training center for disadvantaged youths, and in 1965 the U.S. Office of Economic Opportunity awarded his company Basic Systems, Inc. a contract for establishing and operating such a Job Corps Training Center in Huntington, West Virginia The Job Corps Training Centers that were subsequently established throughout the United States under the Economic Opportunity Act of 1964 were based in part on that design.

From 1960 through 1978 Mechner applied his technology to the creation of large-scale training systems and manpower development programs for governmental agencies in the United States and Brazil. In 1970 he worked with the Carnegie Corporation's Children's Television Workshop project in the original design of certain aspects of the Sesame Street television. As a consultant to UNESCO from 1963 to 1965 he introduced his technology for the modernization of secondary school physics teaching in South America and chemistry teaching in Asia. In 1967 he founded Media Medica, Inc. through which he introduced the use of instructional materials for patient education. Through his company Universal Education Corporation, which he founded in 1968, he developed and installed innovative statewide early childhood development and educational daycare programs for Pennsylvania, Georgia, Nebraska, and Alabama. In 1969 he joined the White House's National Goals Research Staff. In 1971 he testified before the Senate Finance Committee on the importance of early childhood development and educational day care regarding the Mondale-Brademas Comprehensive Child Development Act of 1971, which was passed by the Congress and then vetoed by President Nixon.

In 1968 he founded the Paideia School, an innovative K–12 independent school that he operated until 1973 in Armonk, NY. This school, based on ideas of John Dewey, Jerome Bruner, and Fred S. Keller, provided the original model for the Paideia Personalized Education approach on which the Mechner Foundation's Queens Paideia School in Long Island City, NY, was based. From 1975 to 1977 he developed a computerized information storage and retrieval system and search engine for the Brazilian Government agency Instituto de Pesquisas Technologicas.

== The Mechner Foundation ==
In 1960 Mechner formed the New York State nonprofit company Institute for Behavior Research, the antecedent of the Mechner Foundation that Mechner founded in 1997. Mechner has published numerous technical papers and articles and has lectured and taught courses at dozens of national and international conferences and universities. As President of the Mechner Foundation, he sponsored collaborative research projects in the field of behavioral science with several major universities. [37] He provided the initial funding for the Blacksmith Institute and founded Queens Paideia School. The Mechner Foundation also carried out an extensive basic research program of its own over a 12-year period. Mechner has been a trustee of the Cambridge Center for Behavioral Studies since 1985.

== Business Enterprises ==
Since 1960 Mechner has funded his scientific research work through businesses that he founded and built based on some type of innovative technology. In addition to those described above, Mechner businesses have included Chyron Corporation, which he founded with engineer Eugene Leonard (1966) and was best known for its digital graphics generators used in the broadcast industry; TeleSession Corporation (1970); EDUTEC, S.A. in Brazil (1973); General Clutch Corp. with physicist Dr. Martin Waine (1980); TorqMaster, Inc. with Dr. Martin Waine (1996); and Pragma Financial Systems, LLC (2002) with David Mechner.
