= Chyron Corporation =

American video technology corporation

Chyron
- Type: Private
- Genre: Broadcasting
- Founded: 1966
- Headquarters: Melville, New York, US
- Website: chyron.com

The Chyron Corporation is an American broadcast graphics and real-time data visualization company headquartered in Melville, New York. Founded in 1966 as Systems Resources Corporation, the firm changed its name to Chyron Corporation in the mid-1970s. It designs software and hardware used in television production, including character generators, virtual graphics, and on-air branding systems. In 2013, Chyron merged with Sweden-based Hego AB, forming ChyronHego, before returning to its original name in 2021.

The company was founded in 1966 as Systems Resources Corporation. In its early days it was renamed "Chyron" in reference to the centaur Chiron from Greek mythology. The alternate spelling was chosen after finding that the "Chiron" spelling had been previously registered in California by a "Chiron Corporation". In the 1970s it pioneered the development of broadcast titling and graphics systems. Use of its graphics generators by the major New York City–based US television networks ABC, NBC, and eventually CBS, integrated text and graphics into news and sports coverage on broadcast television and later on cable TV.

By the 1980s, Chyron had captured a 70 percent market share in its field. It was the most profitable company on Long Island. In 1983 it achieved a market capitalization of $112 million, high at the time for a small high-tech firm before the age of dot-com and the Internet.

== Corporate history ==
Chyron's graphics generator technology was originated by Systems Resources Corporation, founded in 1966 by Francis Mechner and engineer Eugene Leonard as equal partners and sole directors and shareholders. Mechner had just sold his educational technology company Basic Systems, Inc. to Xerox Corporation; and Leonard had sold Digitronics Corporation, of which he was president. Mechner and Leonard previously worked together in the late 1950s at Schering Corporation, creating a computerized data collection and analysis system for its behavioral psychopharmacology laboratory.

Mechner provided the capital for Systems Resources Corporation's first five years of operation and Leonard provided his engineering expertise. Between 1966 and 1972, the company developed several innovative digital technology-based products, including a digital graphics generator for displaying letters on a television screen, which it called "Chiron" after the centaur Chiron in Greek mythology. The device controlled the edging of the displayed characters in a manner that took background variables into account.

In 1972, the company hired Joseph L. Scheuer as its vice president of operations (he was an engineer at Leonard's Digitronics). From 1971 to 1978, Eugene Leonard was the company's president, and also directed engineering. The Chiron I, Chiron II and Chiron III character generator families were developed during this time, with conceptual design entirely by Leonard.

In 1975, Systems Resources Corporation merged with Computer Exchange, a used-computer brokerage owned by engineer Leon Weissman, who had also worked for Leonard at Digitronics (Director of Engineering, 1962–1964). Weissman's company had cash, but its business was in a slump. The merger provided SRC with funding beyond Mechner's contributions. The merged company, Chiron, was located in Plainview, New York, only a few miles from its present Melville location.

Leon Weissman placed emphasis on sales and field service, starting the company on a decade of increasingly profitable operations. Differences emerged between Leonard and Weissman with the former wanting to use more of the profits earned for engineering development of even more sophisticated products. Weissman was more cautious about the early introduction of new products, wanting to accumulate working capital and eventually make some distributions to shareholders. These differences led to the departure of Eugene Leonard from the company in 1978. Joseph Scheuer became president and Leon Weissman became chairman and CEO.

In 1983, Leon Weissman turned over his positions as chairman and CEO to Alfred O.P. Leubert. The company continued profitably for some years. Acquisitions were made in order to increase sales. Acquiring companies such as CMX Editing Systems and Aurora Systems did not prove to be profitable in the long run; so much so that in 1991 the company filed for bankruptcy and reorganization. In 1995, new owners took control of the company and appointed Michael I. Wellesley-Wesly as chairman and CEO.

In the 1990s and 2000s, Chyron Corporation continued being successful in its core business, but profitability and stock market success never returned to the glory days of the early 1980s.

In May 2013, Chyron Corporation completed a merger with Sweden-based company Hego AB and its subsidiaries (collectively, the "Hego Group"), a provider of broadcast graphics and data visualization solutions for television and sports. The combined company operated as ChyronHego Corporation until February 2021, when it reverted to its original name, Chyron, with Hego and Tracab continuing as sub-brands.

In 2015, the private equity firm Vector Capital bought ChyronHego for $120 million. The stock of the company, which previously traded on the NASDAQ Global Market under the symbol CHYR, was delisted.

In February 2021, ChyronHego announced that the company will return to its former name Chyron, relegating Hego and Tracab to "sub-brands".

== Product development and history ==
Systems Resources Corporation (SRC) began manufacturing dot-matrix (5×7) character generators (CG) for airport arrival and departure time displays. It also began to release as a product a ROM-based fixed-font CG sold as the Chiron I.

The Chiron I was an AB Dick Videograph 990 (one of the first commercially available video CGs, introduced in 1967) that was licensed from AB Dick and re-branded by SRC as the Chiron I, who improved upon it by updating its display font (using smoother, more rounded characters) loaded in its ROM storage in place of the stock 9x11 matrix font that the Videograph originally used. In addition to its improved display font, the Chiron I also used a second rack of colorization electronics to interface to the main Videograph system to display color text. The Chiron I featured the ability to record and retrieve lower thirds and full page text displays for news departments of TV stations as an alternative to art cards, slides or scrolling black felt.

The company built its own multi-track magnetic storage device, the VidiLoop, based on a two-foot loop of computer tape in a thick clear plastic housing. On the Chiron I, it was used solely for title storage. It was also used on a few early Chiron IIs, but due to increased storage requirements it was replaced by Shugart SA901 8-inch floppy drives as soon as they were available.

The name Chiron was already registered in California, so by replacing the letter I with a Y in the 1970s, they were able to keep the familiar-sounding name and became initially Chyron Telesystems and, later still, Chyron Corporation, capitalizing on the product's name recognition.

The Chiron II featured up to six loadable fonts (typefaces) with, for the time, very high video resolution. The display circuits were running so fast (27 ns) that the fastest ICs available were used and had to be hand selected during manufacture as not all samples were up to par.

It was also the company's first unit to incorporate a 16-bit mini-computer known as the DataMate-70. That processor's code base was used in the Chiron IV and 4100 series systems, which were the workhorses of the mobile sports graphics industry from the late 1970s through most of the 1980s. Programs and fonts were loaded from loop or disk into computer style magnetic core memory. As the font data access needed to be done more quickly than a single core memory could achieve, four core boards were used in parallel to provide faster access. It was also the first CG that had non-monospaced fonts with adjustable inter-row and inter-character spacing.

All of that capability came at a cost too dear for many small market TV stations, and so a spin-off of a project for NBC became the Chiron III (later IIIB); a less capable system that was adequate for many TV news departments was developed and sold. It became the first mobile graphics systems of ABC Sports under Roone Arledge. It was he who pushed the increased use of graphics in sports to what it is today—a significant portion of live sports entertainment. The III's success provided the impetus for the Chiron IV, which was a modernized and reduced-package-size Chiron II suitable for mobile use. It quickly replaced the Chiron IIIs as the dominant sports graphics system. In 1989, Chyron released the iNFiNiT!, with the related Max! and Maxine! coming later in the 90s.

Chyron grew into the leading hardware manufacturer and software designer of 2D and 3D broadcast character generators in North America.

== As generic reference ==
"Lower third" television graphics created by character generators are sometimes generically called chyrons (a form of genericized trademark) regardless of who made them.
