= The Last Express =

1997 adventure video game

- Developer: Smoking Car Productions
- Publishers: Broderbund; Interplay; DotEmu
- Director: Jordan Mechner
- Designer: Jordan Mechner
- Writers: Jordan Mechner; Tomi Pierce
- Platforms: Windows, Mac OS, MS-DOS, iOS, Android
- Release: Windows, Mac OS, MS-DOS; April 16, 1997; Windows (Collector's Edition); January 14, 2011 iOS; September 27, 2012; Android; August 28, 2013; Windows (Gold Edition); November 21, 2013 macOS (Gold Edition); March 17, 2015
- Genre: Adventure
- Mode: Single-player

The Last Express is a 1997 adventure game designed by Jordan Mechner and published by Broderbund for PC. Players take on the role of an American who accepts an invitation from a friend to join them on the Orient Express, days before the start of World War I, only to become involved in a maelstrom of treachery, lies, political conspiracies, personal interests, romance and murder, upon boarding the train. The game is unique in how it was created, its non-linear story, and in how events in the game are conducted within real-time.

The game was a commercial disappointment following its release, but received highly positive reviews and a positive post-release response. A Sony PlayStation port was in development, but was cancelled before it was finished. The game was later reacquired by Mechner, who worked with DotEmu to make portable versions of the game for iOS and Android, and later released a remade version for Steam, entitled The Last Express – Gold Edition.

== Gameplay ==
The game operates primarily from a first-person perspective of the story's lead character when they explore the train, with cutscenes being conducted in the third-person. Gameplay takes place almost entirely within real-time, albeit accelerated by a factor of six; the only time when it is not conducted so is when the player's character sleeps at certain intervals and when the player is on the game's pause menu. Events within the game are scripted. Thus, they occur at specific times denoted by the in-game clock. For example, a character leaving their compartment in order to go to the restaurant car in order to have lunch. When on the pause menu, the player can rewind time, either to a specific point, or to a specific destination on the express route (i.e., Paris). The player may also fast forward to a later time, up until the current point in the story that they have reached.

The main areas of the game are within the carriages of the train, with the player able to look around each place they are in, move down corridors, enter and leave compartments, knock on doors, and talk to people. Items within the game can be interacted with, either to be examined, or in some cases, collected by the player for use later on. The game's story features around thirty characters, each of whom has their own artificial intelligence and individual agendas – they therefore conduct actions that allow them to complete their own personal goals, only changing their plans due to player intervention – with the game using a non-linear approach of story-telling, in which the player's actions or in-actions, affect how the story plays out; the game's many events led to its script being around 800 pages long.

The story features multiple endings, depending on the player's actions. Around thirty of these are game overs, involving the main character being killed or arrested. Four are alternate endings; only one of these is the "true" ending.

== Story ==
=== Setting ===
The game's story takes place in 1914, between 24 and 27 July, aboard the original Orient Express route between Paris and Constantinople (modern Istanbul), prior to the outbreak of World War I. Much of the game occurs within the train itself - consisting of the locomotive, two baggage cars, a restaurant car, two sleeping cars, and a private car. The plot written for the game, while a fictionalized idea regarding the last journey of the Orient Express in 1914, includes many traditional elements of a murder mystery, including secret plots and deals, lies and personal agendas, as well as featuring notable references to political climates in Europe.

=== Plot ===
Robert Cath, an American doctor on the run from the police in regards to a murder in Ireland, is invited by his friend Tyler Whitney to join him on the Orient Express. Boarding the train whilst it is moving through the outskirts of Paris, Cath finds Tyler dead in his sleeping compartment, apparently murdered. Dumping the body from the train during the course of the night's journey, Cath assumes his friend's identity and goes to greet the other passengers travelling on the Express. Amongst the passengers he meets several people of interest: August Schmidt, a German arms dealer; Anna Wolff, an Austrian violinist; Vassili Obolensky, a Russian count travelling with his granddaughter, Tatiana Obolenskaya; Alexei Dolnikov, a Russian anarchist and a childhood friend of Tatiana; Miloš Jovanović, a Serbian travelling with a group of associates; and Kronos, a mysterious art collector travelling in a private car with his African servant Kahina.

Cath discovers, through the course of investigating Tyler's death during the journey to Strasbourg, that his friend was arranging the purchase of weapons from August and supplying these to the Black Hand, a Serbian rebel movement whom Miloš and his associates belong to. To facilitate the deal, Tyler was supplied with a Serbian national treasure called the Firebird - a mechanical music box that transforms into a bird, accompanied with a whistle shaped like a scarab beetle - which he intended to sell to Kronos for the payment August was to receive. Cath finds the Firebird treasure is missing, and is left in the difficult position of finding it to complete Tyler's arrangements. During the night, Cath discovers that Anna knows he is not Tyler, leading him to suspect she knows more about his friend's death. However, Vassili suffers a mental breakdown in his compartment that interrupts their conversation, while forcing Cath to do what he can to treat him. Following the incident, Cath overhears Anna asking Tatiana to look after something, but cannot determine what it is.

The following morning in Munich, Cath witnesses an Englishman named George Abbot board the Express, whilst August oversees the loading of his merchandise, and finds him inquisitive about Cath's treatment of Vassili. Whilst the train is en route to Vienna, Cath finds a French boy in possession of the Firebird's whistle, and recovers it with a small trade. He also has a meeting with Kronos, who himself knows he is using Tyler's identity, and slowly distrusts him, especially as Kahina begins snooping around the sleeping cars. When Kronos invites Anna to perform a concert with him for the other passengers, Cath uses the opportunity to search the train. He soon finds the Firebird itself in Tatiana's washroom, but hides it within the kennel for Anna's dog Max in one of the train's baggage cars. After this, he breaks into Kronos's compartment to borrow his payment in order to ensure August keeps his weapons on the Express. Following the concert, Cath encounters Anna in the baggage car while he is examining August's weapons, and learns from her she took the Firebird, but that Tyler was dead when she did so. She also admits to serving the Austrian government as a spy, but does not specify her mission.

In Vienna, Kronos and Kahina leave the Express without the Firebird. After the train departs, Tatiana consults Cath over deep concerns she has for Alexei, fearing he plans to kill her grandfather for the injustices he served upon his father. On the evening stretch to Budapest, Alexei attempts his plan, but is killed by Vassili, traumatizing Tatiana, while Cath is forced to defuse a bomb Alexei had planted on the train. Abbot shares a drink with him following this, confessing that he was investigating rumors concerning Alexei, while also noting he believes Cath, whom he recognized, is innocent of the murder in Ireland. Visiting Anna in her compartment, Cath becomes romantically involved with her, but the pair are shocked when the train doesn't stop in Budapest. They swiftly are captured by Miloš and his associates, who have hijacked the train. After freeing himself, Cath fights to free the passengers and railways crew. To protect them, Cath detaches the rear carriages from the train once everyone has returned to their compartments; only Anna and her dog, Vassili, Tatiana and Abbot remain on board the Express. Cath regains control of the locomotive, after Anna shoots Miloš to save its engineer, but refuses to let the Express stop within Hungary and keeps it going on into and through Serbia.

As the train makes its way to Turkey, Anna reluctantly accepts that she cannot stop Cath's plans, while Cath himself admits he felt powerless to discovering who really killed Tyler, assuming that one of the Serbs was involved. The pair embrace each other in the moment, and sleep together in the dining car. After a stopover upon crossing into Turkey, Cath is shocked when Kronos turns up on the train with Kahina, intent on claiming the Firebird. Cath is forced to provide it, as Anna is held at gunpoint. But when demonstrating its functions, Cath uses the whistle to activate its hidden function as a living weapon, causing it to kill both Kronos and Kahina; in the process exposing how Tyler died. In the confusion, Cath and Anna jump from the train with Max in tow, as it pulls into Constantinople's Sirkeci Station. However, an unhinged Tatiana finds explosives amongst the weapons in the baggage car, and, wishing for no more war, detonates them with Alexei's lighter, destroying the baggage car and killing herself, Vassili, Abbot and the driver. In the chaos after the explosion, Cath and Anna hear a Turkish boy proclaim that war has broken out in Europe. Forced to return home, Anna leaves Cath with Max, kisses him, and promises to see him again when the war is over. The game ends on a time-lapsing map of Europe, showing the change in borders between 1914-1994.

== History ==
Mechner founded Smoking Car Productions to create The Last Express. The company was located in San Francisco from 1993 to 1997. At its peak, Smoking Car had sixty full-time employees.

Mechner derived inspiration for The Last Express from Myst and Infocom's Deadline. He saw The Last Express as an opportunity to create a game with a complexity of story and depth of characters comparable to that seen in a film, something he felt he could not accomplish with his games for the Apple II due to hardware limitations. He said of the game's approach to storytelling:

There's a built-in tension between making a game that's interactive and has a story. ... With a game like this, the goal is to create, to a certain degree, the illusion of interactivity. You want the player to feel that actions really have consequences. Choosing from multiple branches is not fun. You feel like you're on a branching tree just picking different ways to go, and that's not a game. You have to give players the feeling they really are somewhere, like on a train, and that they can walk down a corridor and open any door and see someone walking and follow them. Yet somehow we have to set things so players are always in the same story, and, when they get to the ending, they feel that's the way it should have ended.

=== Art production ===
The progression from storyboard to finished scene, top to bottom. Note the distinctive "clown" makeup and lined costumes used on the actors.

The game is notable for its unique art style, with characters illustrated in the Art Nouveau style that was popular in 1914, the year the game's events take place. Since illustrating a game of this magnitude by hand would likely take an exorbitant amount of time, the look was achieved by using rotoscoping, a process that Mechner had used in Prince of Persia. During a 22-day-long live-action video shoot, every action by every character in the game was photographed by actors wearing distinctive makeup and costumes against a bluescreen on 16mm film and digitized. From this, a limited number of frames were selected and put through a patented process developed in house, where the frames first had all their colour removed. Next, a powerful computer program created black-and-white line drawings of the frames; these were coloured by hand. The finished product has 40,000 frames.

=== Publishing ===
Following a bidding war between several major game publishers, Broderbund, SoftBank, and GameBank split the worldwide distribution rights. Dubbed versions of the game were released in French, German, Spanish, Italian, Russian (unofficial bootlegged localization), and Japanese.

=== Release ===
The Last Express was released 1997, after five years of development. The game had a final cost of US$5–6 million. The Last Express was released on multi-platform 3-CD set that covered Windows, Mac OS, and MS-DOS. The Last Express received highly positive reviews both in print and online, but only remained in stores for a few months.

Broderbund did little to promote the game, apart from a brief mention in a press release and enthusiastic statements by Broderbund executives. This was partly due to the entire Broderbund marketing team quitting in the weeks before its release. Softbank pulled out of the game market and dissolved its subsidiary GameBank. The company also cancelled several dozen titles in development, including the nearly finished PlayStation port of The Last Express. In a final blow, Broderbund was acquired by The Learning Company, which was not interested in The Last Express. Within a year of its release, The Last Express was out of print. Withal, Mechner's company Smoking Car Productions quietly folded.

== Soundtrack ==
The Last Express

Soundtrack album by Elia Cmiral
- Released: 2000
- Genre: Feature game soundtrack
- Length: 39:00
- Language: English
- Label: Intrada Records

Running thirty-nine minutes, the soundtrack for The Last Express was published by Intrada Records in 2000, but is no longer in print. It was composed, orchestrated, and conducted by American composer born in Czechoslovakia, Elia Cmiral, who later composed the scores for Ronin and Stigmata. Consisting of a mix of dominant synth instruments and occasional solo violin, the score was recorded at Forte Muzika Studios in Los Angeles. The lone exception is the Sonata for Violin and Piano in A major by César Franck featured in the game's concert scene.

As of May 2011, the soundtrack is included as a digital release given away free with the DotEmu and GOG.com versions of The Last Express.

== Reception ==
In 2008, producer Mark Netter declared that The Last Express was "a total commercial failure." Shortly before its launch, the sales and marketing department at publisher Broderbund left the company. As a result, the game received very little marketing to support its release. The game's global distribution was divided between Broderbund, GAMEBANK, and its parent company SoftBank Group. However, SoftBank soon exited the game industry and closed GAMEBANK, which resulted in the cancellation of a "nearly finished PlayStation port of Express", according to programmer Mark Moran.

The Last Express achieved sales of 100,000 units by 2000, and failed to break even. Netter noted that, given its $5-million-dollar budget, The Last Express "would have had to be one of the top-selling games of all time" to recoup its development costs. Moran said that it was ultimately one million sales short of breaking even.

Following the purchase of Broderbund by The Learning Company, the publisher's business was restructured to focus exclusively on edutainment software. The Last Express soon went out of print. Netter noted in 2008, "By the summer of 1997, two months after it had been released, you could no longer buy it." These problems, according to Chris Remo of Gamasutra, left The Last Express "unable to reach the long tail sales on which adventure games traditionally had thrived." GameSpot's Bruce Geryk argued in 2000 that the failure of The Last Express could "in some ways be considered the beginning of the end for the adventure genre."

=== Critical reviews ===
Reception

Review scores
Publication	Score
Computer Gaming World	4.5/5
GameSpot	7.9/10
Next Generation	4/5
PC Gamer (UK)	58%
PC Gamer (US)	90%
PC Magazine	3/5
Computer Games Strategy Plus	4.5/5
MacUser	4/5
Macworld	4/5

The Last Express received highly positive reviews. Critics hailed the game's authentic and compelling period ambiance, complex and unpredictable story, captivating musical score, and unique visual style. Many said that they were compelled to eavesdrop on the various characters' conversations simply to follow their subplots, which give the player the sensation of really being on a train.

The voice acting was also widely praised for the convincing performances and authentic foreign accents. Reactions to the real-time system were more mixed; some said that, while it adds to the tension and immersion in the game, it often requires the player to rewatch numerous scenes when they fail, or sit and wait when they accomplish a segment's tasks early. A few also found that the game does not implement enough originality in its interface or puzzles, too often feeling like another generic adventure game. Next Generation concluded that "Enjoyment of The Last Express depends mostly on one's appreciation for the story and one's acceptance of the standard mechanics. As an attempt at something different, however, we liked it." Computer Gaming World was more enthusiastic, calling it "a captivating look at real-life events from a semi-fictional adventure gaming angle", and GameSpot stated that "through its use of real time and brilliant writing, the game ups the ante for storytelling in gaming."

The editors of Macworld named The Last Express the best role-playing game of 1997. Steven Levy and Cameron Crotty of the magazine wrote, "What makes The Last Express vividly memorable is the painstaking detail, particularly the lush score and the faithfully rendered sounds of the most famous train ever. So while you may never solve this three-disc conundrum, you'll never forget the ride."

The Last Express was a runner-up for Computer Gaming World's, CNET Gamecenter's and GameSpot's 1997 "Adventure Game of the Year" awards, which went variously to The Curse of Monkey Island and Dark Earth. The editors of Computer Gaming World called The Last Express "the year's best mystery" and "stylish and intriguing", and those of GameSpot wrote, "While a few minor gameplay problems held it back from the top spot, there is no doubt that The Last Express is one of the best adventure games of the last few years." Regardless, The Last Express did win GameSpot's 1997 "Best Story" award, and was also the runner-up for the 1997 "Best Ending" award, which went to Fallout.

In 2000, Computer Games Strategy Plus named The Last Express one of the "10 Essential Graphic Adventures". The magazine's Steve Bauman wrote, "While it received terrific reviews, and its innovative storytelling engine should have pointed toward a bold new future for interactive fiction, it had disastrously low sales, essentially bankrupting the company that produced it and telling the industry that consumers weren't interested in this type of game." In 2010, the game was included as one of the titles in the book 1001 Video Games You Must Play Before You Die. In 2011, Adventure Gamers named The Last Express the seventh-best adventure game ever released.

== Legacy ==
=== Re-release ===
In 2000, the Fallout video game series creator and game publisher Interplay bought the lapsed rights and began quietly selling the game as a budget title. A short time later, Interplay went bankrupt; once again, the game went out of print. In 2006, the American subscription-based game service GameTap began offering the game on its network.

On January 14, 2011, DotEmu released the Collector's Edition of the game, which includes the soundtrack, a making-of video and a walkthrough. On January 26, 2011, Phoenix Licensing (the current copyright holder of the game) re-released the game in GOG.com, with all the extras of the Collector's Edition –except the walkthrough– and only in English.

=== Mobile ports ===
Mechner was later able to reacquire the rights to the game and worked in 2012 with DotEmu to release iOS and Android ports of the title. On March 16, 2012, Mechner announced an upcoming release of the game for iOS devices, with "additional enhancements to make it more iOS-friendly." The iOS version (iPad, iPhone and iPod Touch) of the games was released on September 27 by DotEmu.com and is available in the App Store. A version for Android was released on August 28, 2013, through the Google Play Store.

On November 21, 2013, DotEmu released also a Gold Edition for Windows on Steam. It adds improved user interface and inventory, advanced hint system, achievements, and cloud save support. It was released for macOS on March 17, 2015.

=== Film adaptation ===
On April 13, 2010, MTV's Movies Blog posted an excerpt from a recent interview with Dutch film director Paul Verhoeven. In the interview, Verhoeven is quoted as saying, "I am working on a movie now that is... situated in 1914. Basically, Indiana Jones-ish you could say, but also Hitchcockian." He also states that the source material is a video game, and that "the writer of the video game has asked me to keep [the identity of the game] secret until he has a script." Subsequently, several other websites speculated that the video game in question is The Last Express, considering the relative dearth of games set in 1914, as well as Jordan Mechner's work on the film version of Prince of Persia: The Sands of Time.

In October 2011, Verhoeven confirmed that he was working with Mechner to develop a film adaptation of the game. The film would most likely have been filmed in 3D, although it may not have been Verhoeven's immediate next project. The film remains unfinished but Jordan Mechner has uploaded the screenplay he had written for the film on his website.
