= Karateka (video game) =

1984 video game

- Commodore 64 cover art
- Developer: Jordan Mechner (Note: HD remake developed by Liquid Entertainment.)
- Publishers: NA: Broderbund; EU: Ariolasoft; HD; D3Publisher
- Designer: Jordan Mechner
- Engine: Unknown
- Platform: Apple II: Commodore 64, Atari 8-bit, Famicom, MS-DOS, Atari 7800, Atari ST, PC-98, Game Boy, Amstrad CPC, MSX, ZX Spectrum, Xbox 360, Windows, PlayStation 3, iOS, Android
- Release: December 1984: Apple II; NA: December 1984 C64; NA: June 1985; EU: 1985 Atari 8-bit; NA: October 1985 Famicom; JP: December 5, 1985 Atari 7800; NA: October 1987 Atari ST; NA: November 1988 CPC, MSX, ZX Spectrum; EU: 1990 HD remake Xbox 360; WW: November 7, 2012 Windows, PS3; WW: November 2012 iOS; WW: December 2012 Classic Android, iOS; WW: May 16, 2013
- Genres: Fighting, action
- Mode: Single-player

Karateka is a 1984 martial arts action game written for the Apple II by Jordan Mechner. It is his first published game and was created while he was attending Yale University. The game was published in North America by Broderbund and in Europe by Ariolasoft. Along with Karate Champ and Yie Ar Kung-Fu (both also released in 1984), Karateka is one of the earliest martial arts fighting games. It was inspired by Japanese culture (Ukiyo-e art, Akira Kurosawa films, and manga comics) and by early Disney animated films and silent pictures. An influential game of its era, it was one of the first to use cinematic storytelling and sound design, and rotoscoped animation.

The player controls an unnamed protagonist attempting to rescue his love interest, a damsel in distress, Princess Mariko, from Akuma's castle fortress. The character walks and runs from left to right through a linear, side-scrolling level, dealing with attackers and obstacles, while moving deeper into the fortress. Each encounter with an enemy is one-on-one, as in a fighting game. Cinematic cuts show Mariko's situation and Akuma's actions before the player reaches them.

Karateka was ported to the Amstrad CPC, Atari 8-bit computers, Atari 7800, Atari ST, Commodore 64, MS-DOS, Nintendo Entertainment System, ZX Spectrum, PC-98, MSX, and Game Boy. Mechner led a remake, released in 2012, for Xbox 360, Microsoft Windows, PlayStation 3, and iOS.

== Gameplay ==
Fighting Akuma in the Apple II original

Karateka uses gameplay elements found in both side-scrolling 2D platformers and fighting games.

The unnamed hero ascends a mountain into Akuma's fortress to rescue Princess Mariko. As the player directs the hero into the fortress, various foes appear and attempt to stop him, one per screen. The hero enters a fighting stance to punch, kick, and dodge each enemy. Health bars for both the player and the current enemy are displayed at the bottom of the screen, decreasing by one notch for every hit sustained. Both fighters' health bars will slowly regenerate if they avoid being hit during combat for a long enough time. The game ends when all health is lost, requiring the player to start again.

In addition to human enemies, Akuma occasionally sends his trained hawk to attack the player, which can be deflected with well-timed punches or kicks. There are fatal environmental hazards, such as an open cliffside or a falling portcullis. Cutscenes include Akuma ordering his men to attack the player, and Mariko nervously awaiting her fate.

Eventually, the player will fight Akuma directly, then enter Mariko's cell to rescue her. If the hero approaches Mariko while in a fighting stance, she will deliver a kick that results in instant death. Only a non-fighting stance approach will result in the hero rescuing Mariko and the two departing the fortress together.

An Easter egg was present on the Apple II floppy disk release with Broderbund's blessing. Though it was described as single-sided, the disk could be inserted upside down to play a full version of the game with the display reflected vertically, appearing upside-down and backwards. According to Mechner, this was done as a joke, causing users to call tech support and be told to flip the disk over so the game played right-side-up.

== Development ==
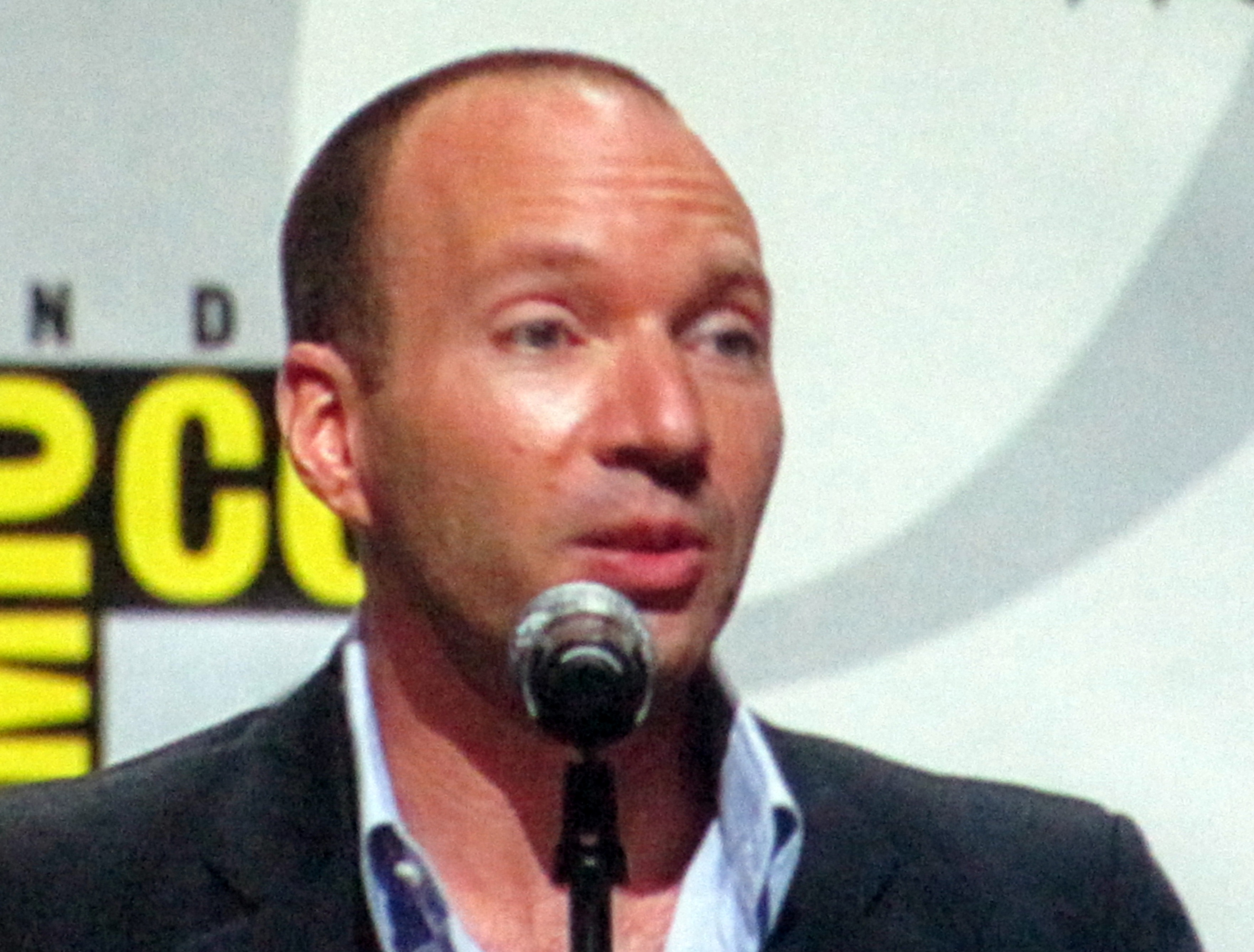
Jordan Mechner in 2010

Karateka was developed by Jordan Mechner while he was a student at Yale University as a side project between classes. Having learned computer programming using the Apple II, he had written a clone of Asteroids and a modified version he titled Deathbounce. He submitted Deathbounce to Broderbund. The company declined but sent him a copy of Choplifter, then one of its top-selling games. He recognized from this game that he could pursue original game concepts instead of having to remake existing ones.

Mechner focused on a karate-themed game, influenced by the graphic features of Choplifter, his ongoing film studies and film clubs at Yale, and recent karate lessons. He drew inspiration from Japanese Ukiyo-e woodblock print art, and the cinematic works of Akira Kurosawa, early Disney animated films, and silent pictures—which he said "convey such powerful emotion and atmosphere without a word being spoken". Combining cinematic techniques with game elements, he programmed some of the screen wipes from the film Seven Samurai. Mechner reflected that he did not consider the game as a "fighting game", but instead that of "a story-based game where the gameplay mechanic is fighting".

Opening hand-drawn storyboards to plot out the course of the game

Mechner wanted to create fluid animations within the Apple II's eight-frame-per-second capacity, but this was hampered by the presence of additional on-screen elements, such as one of the palace gates. He found that the computer could not animate and play music (limited to one-note tones) at the same time, forcing him to adapt. To create the animations, he used rotoscoping, hand-drawing cartoons atop frames of film of his karate instructor demonstrating various moves. His father, Francis Mechner, created the soundtrack. Development took about two years, and he submitted the game to Broderbund late in his sophomore year at Yale.

Though set in Japan, the hero and heroine have blonde hair. Broderbund said that the blonde-haired character design was influenced by Japanese preferences in manga comics, then commonly featuring blonde-haired protagonists in adventure stories.

== Ports ==
Atari 8-bit computer port by Veda Cook

Mechner believed that Veda Cook's versions for the Commodore 64 and Atari 8-bit computers were the best ports, with some superior features including enabling his father to reorchestrate the music. Ports to the Amstrad CPC and MS-DOS appeared in 1986, to the Atari 7800 in 1987, the Atari ST and PC-98 in 1988, and ZX Spectrum in 1990 (the latter only in Spain). The game was released in Japan for the Famicom in 1985, ported by Soft Pro, and specifying its martial art as Nanto Saishi Ken (南斗再試拳 South Dipper Retry Fist). A Game Boy port was done with the name Master Karateka for Asia and featured changes such as the inclusion of an experience system.

== Reception ==
The Apple and Commodore versions debuted on the Billboard magazine software sales chart at number two in July 1985. In January 1986, it was awarded a "Gold" certification from the Software Publishers Association for sales above 100,000 units. It is Broderbund's bestselling Commodore game as of late 1987. Sales of Karateka surpassed 500,000 units by 2000.

The game received generally favorable reviews from critics. In early 1985, Jeff Hurlbert of Hardcore Computist said the "recently released" Karateka "is the most recent and best illustration of a trend towards computer games that look like movies". He called it "a breakthrough" where art "merges with technology to produce a game almost as much fun to watch as to play". In January 1985, Computer Entertainer rated the Apple II version 7½ out of 8 stars, praising the visuals, animation, sound effects, music, karate moves, and story line, but criticizing the blonde-haired appearance of the karateka and princess in a Japanese setting. Computer Entertainer later rated the Commodore 64 version seven out of eight stars in July 1985, praising the "visually stunning" graphics and "authentic" moves, but again questioning "the use of a blond hero and heroine in a Japanese setting". In May 1985, Enter praised the "beautiful graphics, superb animation and realistic sound effects". Billy Gillette called it "a four-star game" but was disappointed with the lack of a score, and Phil Wiswell criticized the lack of a two-player option but concluded with, "wow, what a game!" In October 1985, Compute! called Karateka "a nominee for the Most Underrated Program of the Year. It's a program that must be seen to be fully appreciated". Although criticizing the necessity to restart from the beginning upon defeat, the review stated that the Apple II version "has by far the best animation I've seen in an Apple arcade game. The smoothness of the animation ... makes the game almost as enjoyable to watch as it is to play".

Rick Teverbaugh reviewed the game for Computer Gaming World in April 1986, stating it is more "like an adventure game with karate thrown in" compared to Karate Champ and Kung-Fu Master (1984), and that it "resembles a Chuck Norris movie in flavor". Info rated the Commodore 64 version three stars out of five, praising the animation but disliking its simple and two-dimensional game play, and concluding that it "needs more depth". Antic in 1986 liked its "cartoon-quality" graphics. Although critical of the "often slow" joystick control system, the magazine concluded that Karateka was "fun and extremely addicting". According to Dragon, "this game has a great plot, animation that'll dazzle your eyes, and player-controlled martial arts action". Computer and Video Games rated the Atari 7800 version 83% in 1989.

French magazine Jeux & Stratégie in issue #33 rated the game 4 out of 5 and praised the graphics.

== Legacy ==
=== 2012 remake ===
In February 2012, Mechner announced that he was leading a small independent development group to create a remake of Karateka for the Xbox 360 via Xbox Live Arcade and PlayStation 3 via PlayStation Network. He anticipated a release in late 2012, later moved to November 2012. The remake concept followed his work for the 2010 film Prince of Persia: The Sands of Time. He wanted a new project with a "guerrilla" feel and a much smaller scale than the film. He considered that nearly 30 years after the game's release, he was still being interviewed about Karateka. He envisioned retelling the story without the limitations of the Apple II. He was inspired by the resurgence of small, independent game development in 2010 and 2011, and games such as Limbo that "created a powerful emotional atmosphere within a limited budget and scope".

High-definition remake of Karateka, with quick time event-styled gameplay

Mechner assembled a small independent team at Liquid Entertainment backed by angel investment, to be more hands-on with development. True to the original, he described it as "a compact, pick-up-and-play game that is fluid, atmospheric and beautiful". Cinematic elements include lacking dialogue. His team focused on improving play controls, making them "hard to master", and encouraging replay for improved performance. The team experimented with different approaches, ending up with "brand-new combat mechanics" and a "rhythm-based" fighter, where "you match the rhythm of your opponent's attacks and eventually earn your counterattack".

In anticipating frustration for younger players that may not have played the original game, he removed the one-shot deaths. The player starts as Mariko's "True Love", but upon failing, becoming a second character, a monk. Gameplay continues, and then again as a third character, a Brute. The player can complete the game as any of the characters, maintaining immersion while transitioning between them, though the ultimate goal is reuniting Mariko with her "True Love". Mechner says this gives the approximate forty-minute game high replayability.

He stated that some of the humorous additions, such as the possibility of being killed by Mariko at the end of the game, would likely be removed. He said that "you can't surprise people twice the same way", and replaced this element with other secrets. His focus on pick-up-and-play simplicity led to downloadable distribution. Comic and animation artist Jeff Matsuda joined the team to help with character animations, and composer Christopher Tin developed the dynamic score.

=== The Making of Karateka ===
The studio Digital Eclipse developed a new release of Karateka titled The Making of Karateka, part of the company's Gold Master Series. Development on The Making of Karateka began in 2020 after realizing the wealth of archival material on the game, including journal entries from Mechner, floppy disks and documents from The Strong National Museum of Play. The studio's executive editor Chris Kohler discussed the amount of material, stating "I don't know if we could do this for any single video game. I've never seen a game with this much documentation." The footage in the release includes animation and rotoscoping footage, as well as interviews with Jordan Mechner, his father Francis Mechner, and publishers at Broderbund. The release includes the Apple II, Commodore 64, and Atari 8-bit versions of the game, as well as prototypes and a new remastered version. Mechner's previous game Deathbounce is also included, alongside a remastered version titled Deathbounce: Rebounded.

Despite starting on material for a re-release of Karateka in 2021, Digital Eclipse released the compilation Atari 50 first in 2022, which celebrated the history of the company through an interactive timeline, featuring documentary footage, interviews and games to play. Following positive reception to this format, Digital Eclipse announced they would be doing more releases in this format under the name Gold Master Series, with The Making of Karateka being the first. The Making of Karateka was released on PC, Xbox One, Xbox Series X and Series S, PlayStation 4, PlayStation 5, and Nintendo Switch on August 29, 2023, the latter of which was released in territories outside North America on September 5, 2023.

The release received positive reviews.
