= Prince of Persia (1989 video game) =

1989 video game

- Original cover art used for the home computer versions in the West
- Developer: Broderbund (see Ports)
- Publisher: Broderbund (see Ports)
- Designer: Jordan Mechner
- Composers: Francis Mechner (music); Tom Rettig (sound); Mark Cooksey (NES); Matt Furniss (Sega Master System / Sega Game Gear)
- Series: Prince of Persia
- Platform: Apple II (see Ports)
- Release: NA: October 3, 1989; JP: July 1990; EU: September 1990
- Genre: Cinematic platform
- Mode: Single-player

Prince of Persia is a 1989 cinematic platform game developed and published by Broderbund for the Apple II. It was designed and implemented by Jordan Mechner. Taking place in medieval Persia, players control an unnamed protagonist who must venture through a series of dungeons to defeat the evil Grand Vizier Jaffar and save an imprisoned princess.

Much like Karateka, Mechner's first video game, Prince of Persia used rotoscoping for its fluid and realistic animation. For this process, Mechner used as reference for the characters' movements videos of his brother doing acrobatic stunts in white clothes and swashbuckler films such as The Adventures of Robin Hood.

The game was critically acclaimed and, while not an immediate commercial success, sold many copies as it was ported to a wide range of platforms after the original Apple II release. It is believed to have been the first cinematic platformer and inspired many games in this subgenre, such as Another World. Its success launched the Prince of Persia franchise, consisting of two sequels, Prince of Persia 2: The Shadow and the Flame (1993) and Prince of Persia 3D (1999), and two reboots: Prince of Persia: The Sands of Time (2003), which was followed by three sequels of its own, and Prince of Persia (2008).

== Gameplay ==
Mechner used videos of his brother as a reference for the original animation of the game (pictured: IBM PC–compatible version).

The main objective of the player is to lead the unnamed protagonist out of dungeons and into a fortress tower within 60 minutes (or 120 in the SNES version as it features 10 extra levels). This cannot be done without bypassing traps and fighting hostile swordsmen. The game consists of twelve levels (though some console versions have more). After a player reaches level 2, a game session may be saved and resumed at a later time.

The player has a health indicator that consists of a series of small red triangles at the bottom of the screen. The player starts with three. Each time the protagonist is damaged (cut by sword, falls from two floors of heights, or gets hit by a falling rock), the player loses one of these indicators. There are small jars containing potions of several colors and sizes. The red potions scattered throughout the game restore one health indicator. The blue potions are poisonous, and they take one life indicator as damage. There are also large jars of red potion that increase the maximum number of health indicators by one, and large jars of green potion that grant a temporary ability to hover. In level 9, there are also two large green potions, one which turns the game display upside-down, and another to restore the display back to normal. If the player's health is reduced to zero, the protagonist dies. Subsequently, the game is restarted from the beginning of the level in which the protagonist died but the timer will not reset to that point, effectively constituting a time penalty. There is no counter for the number of lives, but if time runs out, the princess will be gone and the game will be over, with exceptions below.

There are three types of traps that the player must bypass: spike traps, deep pits (three or more stories deep) and guillotines. Getting caught or falling into each results in the instant death of the protagonist. In addition, there are gates that can be raised for a short period of time by having the protagonist stand on the activation trigger. The player must pass through the gates while they are still open, avoiding locking triggers. Sometimes, there are various traps between an unlock trigger and a gate.

Hostile swordsmen (Jaffar and his guards) are yet another obstacle. The player obtains a sword in level 1, which they can use to fight these adversaries. The protagonist's sword maneuvers are as follows: advance, back off, slash, parry, or a combined parry-then-slash attack. Enemy swordsmen also have a health indicator similar to that of the protagonist. Killing them involves slashing them until their health indicator is depleted or by pushing them into traps while fighting.

In level 3 a skeletal swordsman comes to life and does battle with the protagonist. The skeleton cannot be killed with the sword, but it can be defeated by being dropped into one of the pits.

A unique trap encountered in level 4, which serves as a plot device, is a magic mirror, whose appearance is followed by an ominous leitmotif. The protagonist is forced to jump through this mirror upon which his doppelganger emerges from the other side, draining the protagonist's health to one. This apparition later hinders the protagonist by stealing a potion in level 5 and throwing him from level 6 into a dungeon in level 7.

In level 8, the protagonist becomes trapped behind a gate before he can reach the exit. In this level the Princess sends a white mouse to trigger the gate open again, allowing him to proceed to level 9.

In level 12 the protagonist faces his shadow doppelgänger. The protagonist cannot kill this apparition as they share lives; any damage inflicted upon one also hurts the other. Therefore, the protagonist must merge with his doppelganger. Once they have merged, the player can run across an invisible bridge to a new area, where they battle Jaffar. Once the final checkpoint is reached, the player will no longer get a game over screen even if time runs out. (See below.) Once Jaffar is defeated, his spell is broken and the Princess can be saved. In addition, the in-game timer is stopped at the moment of Jaffar's death, and the time remaining will appear on the high scores.

- The DOS and Macintosh ports will not give the player a game over once they reach the final area of level 12 (stored in data as level 13), provided they make it there on time. The player must cross the magic bridge and make a screen-transition to a room with falling tiles to be 'safe'. Running out of time at any point before the screen-transition, including the bridge, will result in game over as usual in both ports.
  - Once there in the Macintosh port, they will always be allowed to continue, regardless of deaths or time expiration.
  - The "overtime" in the DOS version has no extra life, so:
1. Pressing Control A to restart level 13 is no death, thus not failing the game yet.
2. Any player's death fails the game so the Princess is also gone even if Jaffar is already killed.
3. Only defeating Jaffar and exiting level 13 alive will save the Princess, with a negative time on the high scores.
- The Super NES remake allows the players to save themselves after time is out, to get the "game over" at the end without the princess saved, as opposed to "the end" announced for good ending.

== Plot ==
The game is set in medieval Persia. While the sultan is fighting a war in a foreign land, his vizier Jaffar, a wizard, seizes power. His only obstacle to the throne is the Sultan's daughter. Jaffar locks her in a tower and orders her to become his wife, or she would die within 60 minutes (extended to 120 minutes in the Super NES version, which has longer and harder levels). The game's unnamed protagonist, whom the Princess loves, is thrown into the palace's dungeons. In order to free her, he must escape the dungeons, get to the palace tower and defeat Jaffar before time runs out. In addition to guards, various traps and dungeons, the protagonist is further hindered by his own doppelgänger, having been conjured out of a magic mirror.

== Development ==
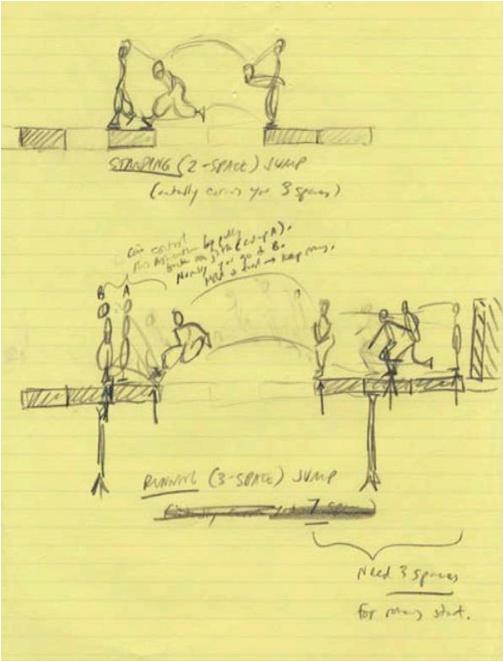
Mechner used hand-drawn storyboards such as this to lay out the game's level design and character movements.

Development for the game began in 1985, the year Jordan Mechner graduated from Yale University. At that time, Mechner had already developed one game, Karateka, for distributor Broderbund. Despite expecting a sequel to Karateka, the distributor gave Mechner creative freedom to create an original game. The game drew from sources of inspiration including video games such as The Castles of Dr. Creep and Lode Runner, literature such as the Arabian Nights stories, and films such as Raiders of the Lost Ark and The Adventures of Robin Hood.

For a few seconds, the camera angle has them in exact profile. This was a godsend. I did my VHS/one-hour-photo rotoscope procedure, spread two-dozen snapshots out on the floor of the office and spent days poring over them trying to figure out what exactly was going on in that duel, how to conceptualise it into a repeatable pattern.

— Jordan Mechner on how he used the final duel between Errol Flynn and Basil Rathbone from The Adventures of Robin Hood to create the game's swordfighting mechanic.

Prince of Persia was programmed in 6502 assembly, a low-level programming language. Mechner used an animation technique called rotoscoping, with which he used footage to animate the characters' sprites and movements. The animation loop for the Prince's walk cycle alone required 12 frames. To create the protagonist's platforming motions, Mechner traced video footage of his younger brother David running and jumping in white clothes. To create the game's sword fighting sprites, Mechner rotoscoped the final duel scene between Errol Flynn and Basil Rathbone in The Adventures of Robin Hood. Though the use of rotoscoping was regarded as a pioneering move, Mechner later recalled that "when we made that decision with Prince of Persia, I wasn't thinking about being cutting edge — we did it essentially because I'm not that good at drawing or animation, and it was the only way I could think of to get lifelike movement." Also unusual was the method of combat: protagonist and enemies fought with swords, not projectile weapons, as was the case in most contemporary games. Mechner has said that when he started programming, the first ten minutes of the film Raiders of the Lost Ark had been one of the main inspirations for the character's acrobatic responses in a dangerous environment.

During development, the Prince was meant to be a nonviolent character, so the game did not initially include combat. However, due to finding the gameplay to be dull and after incessant demand from his colleague Tomi Pierce, Mechner added sword-fighting to the game and created Shadow Man, the Prince's doppelgänger. Guards were later added when Mechner managed to make use of an additional 12K of the Apple II's memory.

Mechner only created the Apple II original. By 1990, game sales for Apple and Commodore 64 were declining; Broderbund could not avoid publishing the Apple version but did not port the game to Commodore. Besides the original, Broderbund contracted Mechner to provide the Amiga and Macintosh versions, which he subcontracted to others. The DOS version was developed at the same time as the Apple II version and shipped a few months later; with better graphics and sound than the original, it became the source for most other platforms, and Mechner said that he would recommend it to most modern players.

Mechner was offended by the cover art for the Sega Genesis version, which depicts the prince as a Luke Skywalker lookalike about to cut down a helpless black guard, but by the time he made his objections, it was already being printed.

For the Japanese computer ports, Arsys Software and Riverhillsoft enhanced visuals and redesigned the Prince's appearance, introducing the classic turban-and-vest look. This version became the basis for the Macintosh version and later Prince of Persia ports and games by Broderbund. Riverhillsoft's FM Towns version also added a Red Book CD audio soundtrack. Arsys also created the Super NES version, adding eight more levels with new enemies, traps, and music. Praising the changes, Mechner wrote "I'll never forget the delighted thrill of being surprised playing my own game".

The Amiga version of the game was developed by Dan Gorlin, whom Mechner had admired from childhood for Choplifter. Tommy Tallarico worked on the audio for the Game Boy port of the game, and it was the first game he worked on. He originally started as a playtester for Virgin Interactive.

The game included anti-piracy protection in the form of a second level, where you had to drink the correct bottle according to the manual.

The PC game later received three updates: version 1.1 had minor fixes, in version 1.3 the colors of the walls in some levels were changed (instead of blue walls, level 3 was green, 8th and 9th were gray, and 12th was yellow) and a program for graphics and sound settings was added, version 1.4 contains the same color scheme as the previous one, but the sound could only be set to Sound Blaster or PC speaker and the graphics could not be set to older than VGA.

== Ports ==
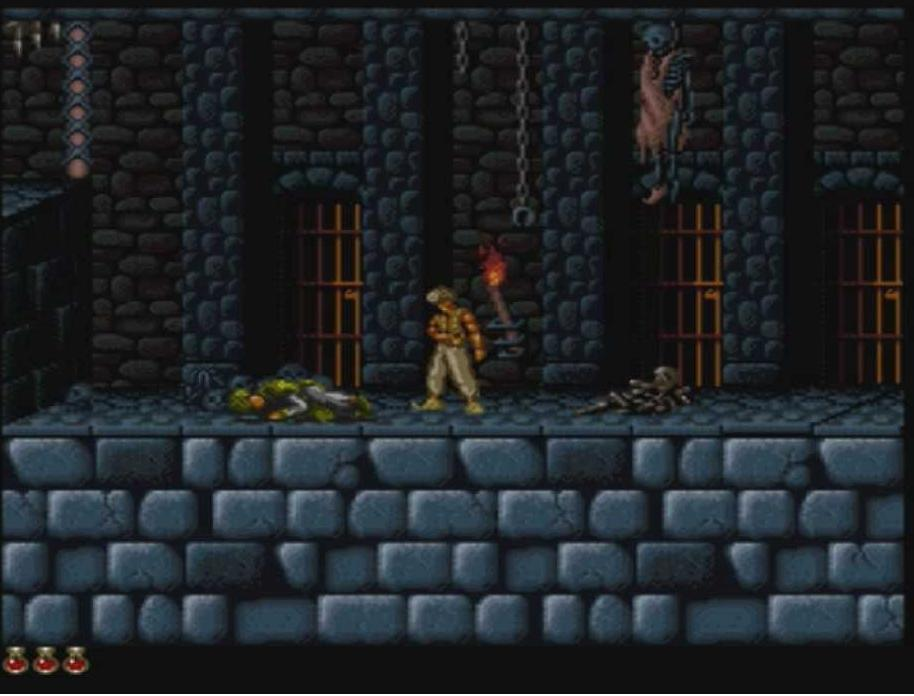
Screenshot from the Super NES version developed by Arsys. It has enhanced graphics and more levels than the original.

Official
Port	Release	Developer	Publisher
MS-DOS	April 1990	Broderbund	
PC-98	July 1990	Arsys Software	Riverhillsoft
Amiga	December 1990 (EU)	Dan Gorlin	Domark
Atari ST	March 1991	Broderbund	
X68000		Riverhillsoft	
Amstrad CPC		Broderbund	
SAM Coupé		Chris 'Persil' White	Revelation
TurboGrafx-16		Riverhillsoft	
Game Boy		Virgin Games	
FM Towns		Riverhillsoft	
Master System	October 1, 1992	The Kremlin	Domark
Super NES		Arsys Software	Masaya (JP); Konami (US, EU)
Sega CD	April 2, 1993 (EU)	Bits Laboratory	Victor Musical Industries (JP); Sega (US, EU)
NES		MotiveTime	Virgin Games (US); Mindscape (EU)
Classic Mac OS		Presage Software development, Inc.	
Game Gear		The Kremlin	Domark
Genesis	February 1994 (US); March 1994 (EU)	Domark	Tengen (US); Domark (EU)
Game Boy Color		Ed Magnin and Associates	Red Orb Entertainment
Mobile ("Classic")		Gameloft	
Xbox 360 ("Classic")		Gameloft	Ubisoft
PlayStation 3 ("Classic")		Gameloft	Ubisoft
Blackberry ("Classic")		Gameloft	
iOS ("Retro", replaced by "Classic" version in 2011)		Ubisoft	
iOS ("Classic")		Ubisoft	
Nintendo 3DS (Game Boy Color version on Virtual Console)	January 19, 2012	Ubisoft	
Wii (Super NES version on Virtual Console)	January 19, 2012	Ubisoft	
Android ("Classic")		Ubisoft Pune	Ubisoft
Unofficial
Port	Release	Developer	Publisher
ATM Turbo		Honey Soft, Andrey Honichem	Moscow
Electronika BK-0010		Погорельцев В.	
ZX Spectrum		Nicodim	Magic Soft; MC Software
HP48/GX		Iki	
TI-89, TI-92		David Coz	
Enterprise 128		Geco (Noel Persa)	
Plus/4 (Demo)		GFW & ACW	
Commodore 64		Andreas Varga	
Linux, macOS, Windows		Dávid Nagy. This port, called SDLPoP, uses SDL.	
Roku (Streaming Box and Smart TV)		Marcelo Lv Cabral	
BBC Master		Kieran	
Electronika BK-0011M		Evgeny Pashigorov, Pasha Sizykh	Flame software
Atari 8-bit computers		rensoup	
JavaScript		Oliver Klemenz	
Plus/4		Tamás Sasvári, Csaba Kémeri, Csaba Pankaczy	
VIC-20		Pedro Bermejo	

== Reception ==
Reception

Review scores
Publication	Score					
Publication	DOS	Macintosh	Master System	PC	Sega Genesis	SNES
Dragon		5/5				
Electronic Gaming Monthly					32/40	
Génération 4				90%		
Mean Machines			91%			93%
Adventure Classic Gaming	4/5					
Bad Influence!						8/10
MacWorld		4/5				
Mega Guide			Positive			
MegaTech					82%	
Sega Force			94%			

Awards
Publication	Award
MacUser	1992 Eddy Award
TILT!	1992 Tilt d'Or

Prince of Persia received a positive critical reception, but was initially a commercial failure in North America, where it had sold only 7,000 units each on the Apple II and IBM PC by July 1990. It was when the game was released in Japan and Europe that year that it became a commercial success. In July 1990, the NEC PC-9801 version sold 10,000 units as soon as it was released in Japan. It was then ported to various different home computers and video game consoles, eventually selling 2 million units worldwide by the time its sequel Prince of Persia 2: The Shadow and the Flame (1993) was in production.

Charles Ardai of Computer Gaming World wrote that the game package's claim that it "breaks new ground with animation so uncannily human it must be seen to be believed" was true. He wrote that Prince of Persia "succeeds at being more than a running-jumping game (in other words, a gussied-up Nintendo game)" because it "captures the feel of those great old adventure films", citing Thief of Baghdad, Frankenstein, and Dracula. Ardai concluded that it was "a tremendous achievement" in games comparable to that of Star Wars in film.

In 1991, the game was ranked the 12th best Amiga game of all time by Amiga Power. In 1992, The New York Times described the Macintosh version as having "brilliant" graphics and "excellent" sound. Reviewing the Genesis version, GamePro praised the "extremely fluid" animation of the player character and commented that the controls are difficult to master but nonetheless very effective. Comparing it to the Super NES version, they summarized that "the Genesis version has better graphics, and the SNES has better music. Otherwise, the two are identical in almost every way ..." Electronic Gaming Monthly (EGM) likewise assessed the Genesis version as "an excellent conversion of the classic action game", and added that the game's challenging strategy and technique give it high longevity. EGM's panel of four reviewers each gave it a rating of 8 out of 10, adding up to an overall score of 32 out of 40.

In 1991, PC Format named Prince of Persia one of the 50 best computer games ever, highlighting its "unbelievably good animation". In 1996, Computer Gaming World named Prince of Persia the 84th best game ever, with the editors calling it "an acrobatic platformer with amazingly fluid action". In 1995, Flux ranked the game 42nd on their Top 100 Video Games.

== Legacy ==
Prince of Persia influenced cinematic platformers such as Another World and Flashback as well as action-adventure games such as Tomb Raider, which used a similar control scheme. A few DOS games were created using exactly the same game mechanics as the DOS version of Prince of Persia. Makh-Shevet created Cruel World in 1993 and Capstone Software created Zorro in 1995.

Prince of Persia was remade and ported by Gameloft. The remake, titled Prince of Persia Classic, was released on June 13, 2007, to the Xbox Live Arcade, and on October 23, 2008, on the PlayStation Network. It features the same level design and general premise but contained 3D-rendered graphics, more fluid movements, and Sands of Time aesthetics. The gameplay and controls were slightly adjusted to include a wall-jump move and different swordplay. New game modes were also added, such as "Time Attack" and "Survival". The game has also been released on Android.

Reverse engineering efforts by fans of the original game have resulted in detailed documentation of the file formats of the MS-DOS version. Various level editors have been created that can be used to modify the level files of the game. With these editors and other software, over 60 mods have been created.

In April 2012, Jordan Mechner established a GitHub repository containing the long-thought-lost original Apple II source code for Prince of Persia. A technical document describing the operation of this source code is available on Mechner's website.

In April 2020, Mechner did an AMA on Reddit where he stated that he would be releasing his journals from the development of the game as a book and users could ask any questions that they may have about the game to him.
