= Jordan Mechner =

American video game designer (born 1964)

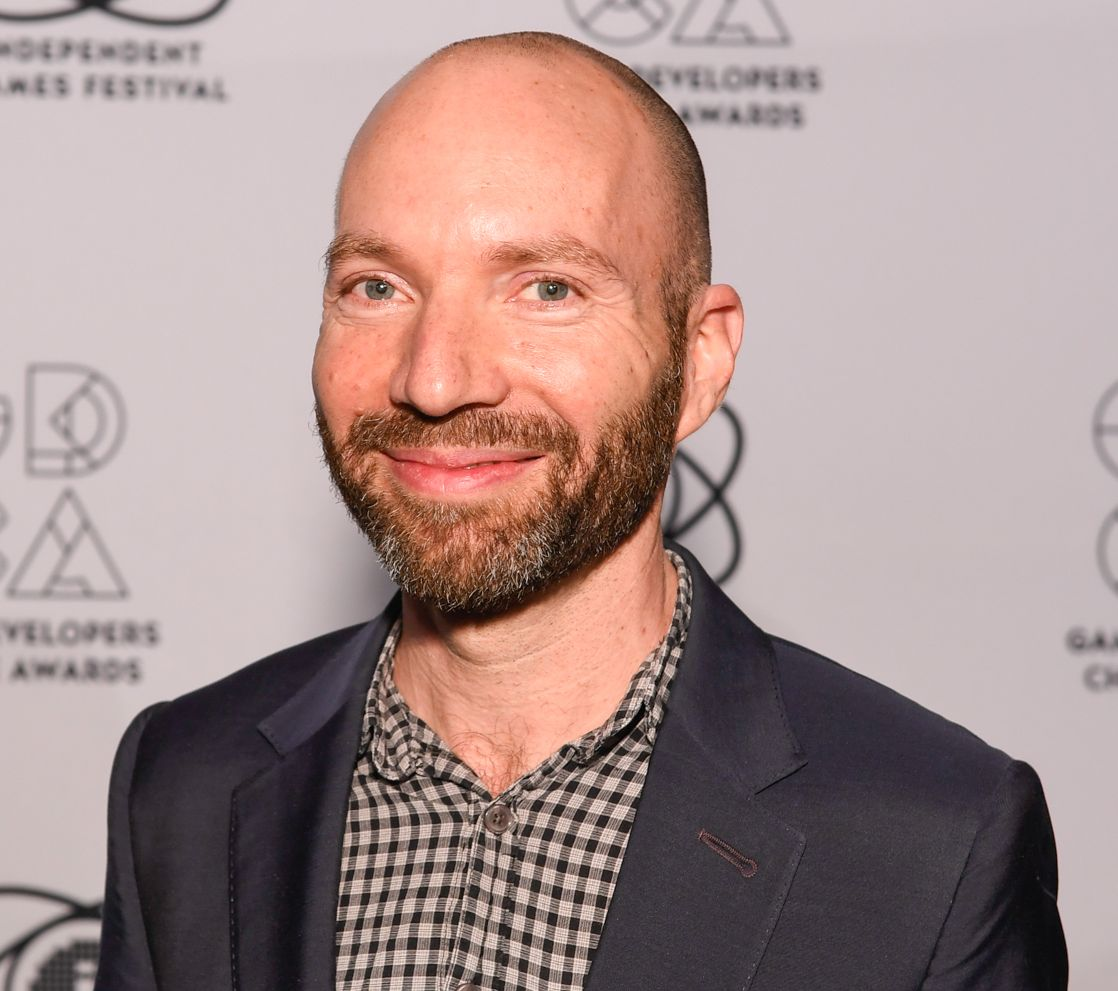
- Mechner in 2017
- Born: June 4, 1964 (age 62); New York City, United States
- Occupations: Video game designer; graphic novelist; screenwriter; author; filmmaker
- Notable work: Karateka; Prince of Persia; The Last Express; Prince of Persia: The Sands of Time; Prince of Persia: The Sands of Time (film)
- Spouse: Whitney Hills (m. 2014; div. 2017)
- Website: jordanmechner.com

Jordan Mechner (born June 4, 1964) is an American video game designer, graphic novelist, author, screenwriter, filmmaker, and former video game programmer. A major figure in the development of cinematic video games and a pioneer in video game animation, he began his career designing and programming the bestselling 1984 martial arts game Karateka for the Apple II while a student at Yale University. He followed it with the platform game Prince of Persia five years later; it was widely ported and became a hit. Both games used rotoscoping, where actors shot on film by Mechner were drawn over to create in-game animation. Prince of Persia has become the basis for a long-running franchise, including a 2010 live-action film released by Walt Disney Pictures and an ongoing series of video games published by Ubisoft.

Mechner is the recipient of many accolades, including the 2017 GDC Pioneer Award. His works are often included in all-time lists of the game industry's best and most influential titles.

In 1993, Mechner founded Smoking Car Productions to design and direct the adventure game The Last Express. While commercially unprofitable at the time of its release, the game has garnered a cult following and is recognized as an innovative work in interactive narrative.

As an author, Mechner has written graphic novels in collaboration with different illustrators, including the New York Times bestseller Templar (2013), Monte Cristo (2022), and Liberty (2023). In 2023, Mechner made his debut as a graphic novel writer–artist, with the autobiographical Replay: Memoir of an Uprooted Family. Replay was awarded the 2023 Chateau de Cheverny prize for historical graphic novels.

In 2009, he was chosen by IGN as one of the top 100 game creators of all time.

== Early life ==
Mechner was born in New York City in 1964, into a family of European Jewish immigrants. His father is psychologist Francis Mechner, and his mother was a programmer. He attended Yale University in the 1980s.

== Career ==
While at Yale, Mechner wrote several Apple II games that he submitted for publication, but which were rejected. Asteroid Blaster, an Asteroids clone, was submitted to Hayden Software and abstract action game Deathbounce to Broderbund. Mechner then spent two years at Yale writing his first published game, Karateka (1984), which went to number one on the Billboard software chart. Karateka is a horizontally scrolling game where meeting an enemy results in a prolonged fight. The game cuts between gameplay and what is happening out of the player's view, showing actions of the imprisoned princess and her captor. The animation was done by drawing on top of frames of Mechner's karate instructor recorded on film.

His second game, Prince of Persia, was released in 1989 after more than three years of work. He wrote both games in the 6502 assembly language for the Apple II, though that system was in decline through the late 1980s, and little new software was released by 1989. Initially, Prince of Persia sold poorly, but as it was ported to other systems, sales increased. Eventually, it was adapted for about thirty computer and console platforms.

Following the completion of Prince of Persia, Mechner attended film school, traveled to Cuba to produce and direct a short documentary film, and lived in Paris for a year. During this period, he designed and directed the sequel, Prince of Persia 2: The Shadow and the Flame, released in 1993.

He founded the independent developer Smoking Car Productions in 1993, where he led the production of the CD-ROM adventure game The Last Express. Smoking Car grew to sixty people, a huge team for the mid-1990s, and the game took longer to finish than anticipated. When finally released in 1997, it was positively reviewed but did not recoup its budget. The Last Express was re-released in 2012 by French publisher DotEmu for mobile and other platforms.

In 2017, he won the Honorific Award at the Fun & Serious Game Festival.

=== Prince of Persia revival ===
In 2001, Mechner worked with Ubisoft to reboot Prince of Persia. Developed at Ubisoft Montreal with Mechner as game designer, writer, and creative consultant, Prince of Persia: The Sands of Time was released in 2003. It received twelve nominations and eight awards at the Interactive Achievement Awards. Ubisoft has since published four more Prince of Persia sequels and several spinoffs, including the Assassin's Creed franchise, which was initially conceived as a sequel to Sands of Time. In 2024, Ubisoft released Prince of Persia: The Lost Crown, a new relaunch of the franchise, developed at its Montpellier studio.

A film adaptation, Prince of Persia: The Sands of Time, was released on May 28, 2010. Mechner wrote the first drafts of the screenplay and also has an executive producer credit.

=== Writing and directing ===
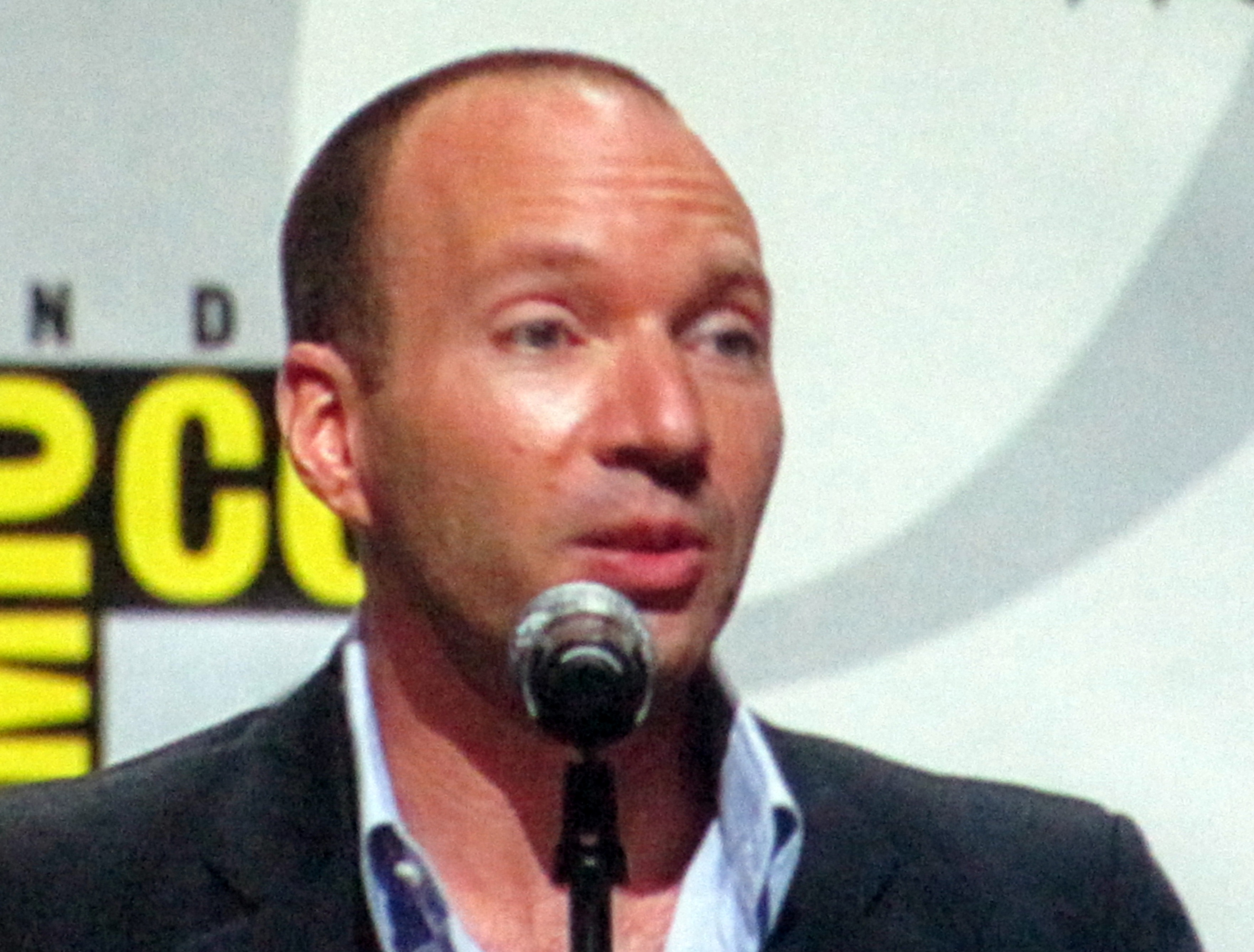
Jordan Mechner at WonderCon 2010

In 2003, Mechner wrote and directed the documentary film Chavez Ravine: A Los Angeles Story. It won the 2003 IDA award for Best Short Documentary, was short-listed for an Academy Award nomination, and received its broadcast premiere on PBS Independent Lens in 2005.

Mechner collaborated with a team on the 2008 Prince of Persia graphic novel. The author's graphic novel Templar was published in July 2013. Templar became a New York Times best-selling book and was nominated for an Eisner Award. Mechner also wrote the graphic novel Prince of Persia: Before the Sandstorm, to tie in with the release of the film in 2010.

He has published two volumes of his game development journals from the 1980s, one describing the making of Karateka and the other focusing on Prince of Persia.

Mechner has written a screenplay for a film adaptation of Michael Turner's Fathom for Fox Studios.

In 2017, Mechner moved to Montpellier, France. He has collaborated with European illustrators on graphic novels, including Monte Cristo (2023) and Liberty (2022). In 2023, he released an autobiographical graphic novel, Replay: Memoires d'une famille. He continues to write new graphic novels.

== Works ==
=== Games ===
Title	Year	Platform	Publisher
Karateka	1984	Apple II	Broderbund
Prince of Persia	1989	Apple II	Broderbund
Prince of Persia 2: The Shadow and the Flame	1993	MS-DOS	Broderbund
The Last Express	1997	Windows, MS-DOS, Classic Mac OS	Broderbund
Prince of Persia: The Sands of Time	2003	Windows, PlayStation 2, Xbox	Ubisoft
Karateka	2012	Windows, Xbox 360	D3 Publisher
The Making of Karateka	2023	Windows, Xbox One, Xbox Series X and Series S, PlayStation 4, PlayStation 5, Nintendo Switch	Digital Eclipse

=== Bibliography ===
Title	Year	Publisher	Collaborators	ref
Prince of Persia: The Graphic Novel	2008	First Second Books	A.B. Sina (writer), LeUyen Pham & Alex Puvilland (illus.)	
The Making of Prince of Persia: Journals 1985–1993	2010	Amazon		
Prince of Persia: Before the Sandstorm	2010	Disney	Todd McFarlane, Bernard Chang, Cameron Stewart, et al. (illus.)	
Solomon's Thieves (Templar: Book One)	2010	First Second Books	LeUyen Pham & Alex Puvilland (illus.)	
The Making of Karateka: Journals 1982–1985	2012	Amazon		
Templar	2013	First Second Books	LeUyen Pham & Alex Puvilland (illus.)	
The Making of Prince of Persia	2020	Stripe Press		
Samak the Ayyar (English-language rendering of the Samak-e Ayyar tales)	2021	Columbia University Press	Freydoon Rassouli (trans.)	
Monte Cristo	2022–2023	Glénat Editions	Mario Alberti (illus.) & Claudia Palescandolo (col.)	
Liberty	2023–2024	Delcourt Editions	Étienne Le Roux (illus.), Loïc Chevallier (illus.) & Elvire De Cock (col.)	
Replay: Mémoires d'une famille	2023	Delcourt Editions		
Replay: Memoir of an Uprooted Family	2024	First Second Books		

=== Filmography ===
- Waiting for Dark (1993)
- Chavez Ravine: A Los Angeles Story (2003)
- Prince of Persia: The Sands of Time (2010) (screenwriter)

== Personal life ==
Mechner married Whitney Hills in 2014. The couple divorced in 2017.
